= 2009–10 British Basketball League season =

2009–10 BBL season
- League: British Basketball League
- Sport: Basketball

Roll of Honour
- BBL champions: Newcastle Eagles
- Play Off's champions: Everton Tigers
- BBL Cup champions: Sheffield Sharks
- BBL Trophy champions: Newcastle Eagles

British Basketball League seasons
- 2008–09 2010–11

The 2009–10 BBL season of the British Basketball League (BBL) was the 23rd season since the league's establishment in 1987. The regular season commenced on 25 September 2009, when Milton Keynes Lions claimed the first win of the season with a 94–81 victory in the opening game against Worcester Wolves.

A total of 13 teams took to the court including new start-up franchise Essex Pirates, which was founded by Great Britain Under 20s coach Tim Lewis, and a newly rebranded Rocks team carrying the name of the city of Glasgow instead of their previous Scottish Rocks title.

The League Championship came down to the final game of the season and was only claimed by Newcastle Eagles after Sheffield Sharks lost their last game, 97–95, to Worthing Thunder. Thunder's Evaldas Zabas' basket four seconds from the end meant that Newcastle had won the League even before taking to the court the following day.

Everton Tigers concluded the season with victory in the play-offs despite being the lowest seed in all of their Play-off encounters. An 80–72 win against Glasgow in the final gave Tigers their first ever Play-off title, only two years after its foundation in 2007.

== Teams ==
Locations of the 2009–10 BBL teams

Team	City/Area	Arena	Capacity	Last season
Cheshire Jets	Chester	Northgate Arena	1,000	8th
Essex Pirates	Southend-on-Sea	Southend Leisure & Tennis Centre	1,100	New
Everton Tigers	Liverpool	Echo Arena & Greenbank Sports Academy	7,513; 600	2nd
Glasgow Rocks	Glasgow	Kelvin Hall	1,200	7th
Guildford Heat	Guildford	Guildford Spectrum	1,100	4th
Leicester Riders	Leicester	John Sandford Centre	800	3rd
London Capital	London	Capital City Academy	300	12th
Milton Keynes Lions	Milton Keynes	Bletchley Centre & Middleton Hall (thecentre:mk)	800; 1,500	9th
Newcastle Eagles	Newcastle upon Tyne	Metro Radio Arena	6,500	1st
Plymouth Raiders	Plymouth	Plymouth Pavilions	1,480	5th
Sheffield Sharks	Sheffield	English Institute of Sport	1,200	6th
Worcester Wolves	Worcester	University of Worcester	600	10th
Worthing Thunder	Worthing	Worthing Leisure Centre	1,000	11th

== Notable occurrences ==
- Essex Pirates were the latest addition to the BBL, bringing the number of teams up to 13 in total for the season.
- Due to a sponsorship agreement with Glasgow City Council, the Scottish Rocks rebranded as the Glasgow Rocks to support its hometown.
- In early November the Worcester Wolves franchise was thrown into turmoil after a Coach Chuck Evans' team talk lead to a much publicised racism row resulting in his resignation and the discipling and sacking of six players following a team strike. In response to this the League agreed to postpone Wolves' following five games until later dates, plus in accordance with the league's rules, the franchise had been fined an undisclosed amount.
- Paul James marked his return to the League in December when he was appointed as Coach of the new-look Worcester Wolves, succeeding Chuck Evans.
- Following the scheduled demolition of the Bletchley Centre and delayed construction of their new venue, Milton Keynes Lions sought the use of an unusual facility as their home arena by renting floor space in thecentre:mk shopping mall. Middleton Hall played host to its first game on 12 January against Essex Pirates and would host a further nine games throughout the season.
- Milton Keynes Lions forward Guy Dupuy was crowned winner of the 2010 BBL Slam Dunk contest on 17 January, beating Kadiri Richard in the final round.
- Cheshire Jets guard John Simpson failed an Anti-doping drugs test it was announced on 29 March, testing positive for marijuana. The player subsequently had his contract terminated by the club with immediate effect.

== BBL Championship (Tier 1) ==
=== Final standings ===
Pos	Team	Pld	W	L	%	Pts
1	Newcastle Eagles	36	31	5	0.861	62
2	Sheffield Sharks	36	30	6	0.833	60
3	Glasgow Rocks	36	23	13	0.638	46
4	Cheshire Jets	36	22	14	0.611	44
5	Everton Tigers	36	21	15	0.583	42
6	Leicester Riders	36	21	15	0.583	42
7	Milton Keynes Lions	36	18	18	0.500	36
8	Worthing Thunder	36	18	18	0.500	36
9	Worcester Wolves	36	18	18	0.500	36
10	Plymouth Raiders	36	11	25	0.305	22
11	Guildford Heat	36	11	25	0.305	22
12	Essex Pirates	36	7	29	0.194	14
13	London Capital	36	3	33	0.083	6

= League winners
= Qualified for the play-offs

=== Playoffs ===
==== Quarter-finals ====
23 April 2010

Newcastle Eagles	102–74	Worthing Thunder

Metro Radio Arena, Newcastle upon Tyne

23 April 2010

Sheffield Sharks	104–93	Milton Keynes Lions

English Institute of Sport, Sheffield

25 April 2010

Glasgow Rocks	88–86	Leicester Riders

Kelvin Hall, Glasgow

25 April 2010

Cheshire Jets	79–94	Everton Tigers

Northgate Arena, Chester

==== Semi-finals 1st leg ====
30 April 2010

Sheffield Sharks	93–90	Glasgow Rocks

English Institute of Sport, Sheffield

30 April 2010

Everton Tigers	95–79	Newcastle Eagles

Greenbank Sports Academy, Liverpool

==== Semi-finals 2nd leg ====
1 May 2010

Newcastle Eagles	79–95	Everton Tigers

Metro Radio Arena, Newcastle upon Tyne

2 May 2010

Glasgow Rocks	74–65	Sheffield Sharks

Kelvin Hall, Glasgow

Everton Tigers win 190-158 on aggregate and Glasgow Rocks won 164-158 on aggregate.

==== Final ====
8 May 2010
6.00pm GMT

Report

Glasgow Rocks	72–80	Everton Tigers
Scoring by quarter: 9-23, 19-22, 25-11, 19-24
Pts: Robert Yanders 15, Jessie Sapp 14, Mike Copeland 14, Sterling Davis 11, Gareth Murray 8, Michael Crowell 8, Steve Parillon 2		Pts: Trey Moore 22, Kevin Bell 18, James Jones 15, Olu Babalola 11, Andrew Thomson 8, Jerome Gumbs 4, Chris Haslam 2

National Indoor Arena, Birmingham

== EBL National League Division 1 (Tier 2) ==
=== Final standings ===
Pos	Team	Pld	W	L	%	Pts
1	Derby Trailblazers	22	17	5	0.773	34
2	Manchester Magic	22	16	6	0.727	32
3	Leeds Carnegie	22	16	6	0.727	32
4	Bristol Academy Flyers	22	16	6	0.727	32
5	Leicester Warriors	22	13	9	0.591	26
6	London Mets	22	12	10	0.545	24
7	Reading Rockets	22	12	10	0.545	24
8	Taunton Tigers	22	12	10	0.545	24
9	London Leopards	22	6	16	0.273	12
10	Coventry Crusaders	22	5	17	0.227	10
11	Tees Valley Mohawks	22	4	18	0.182	8
12	City of Sheffield Arrows	22	3	19	0.136	6

= League winners
= Qualified for the play-offs

== EBL National League Division 2 (Tier 3) ==
=== Final standings ===
Pos	Team	Pld	W	L	%	Pts
1	Durham Wildcats	20	18	2	0.900	36
2	Brixton TopCats	20	15	5	0.750	30
3	Mansfield Giants	20	14	6	0.700	28
4	Edmonton Storm	20	13	7	0.650	26
5	Westminster Warriors	20	12	8	0.600	24
6	Medway Park Crusaders	20	9	11	0.450	18
7	Birmingham A's	20	8	12	0.400	16
8	Glyndwr Nets	20	8	12	0.400	16
9	Team Northumbria	20	8	12	0.400	16
10	Plymouth Marjon Cannons	20	3	17	0.150	6
11	University of Birmingham	20	2	18	0.100	4

= League winners
= Qualified for the play-offs

== BBL Cup ==
Due to the odd number of teams competing in the BBL Cup – 13 in total – the knockout tournament was structured with the Quarter-finals round featuring the winners of the five First round ties plus three teams given byes. The teams given bye's through the first round were the top-three placed teams from the 2008–09 season league campaign – Everton Tigers, Leicester Riders and Newcastle Eagles.

=== First round ===
16 October 2009

Milton Keynes Lions	79–75	Guildford Heat

Bletchley Centre, Milton Keynes

17 October 2009

Essex Pirates	71–78	Worcester Wolves

Southend Leisure & Tennis Centre, Southend

17 October 2009

Plymouth Raiders	85–80	London Capital

Plymouth Pavilions, Plymouth

17 October 2009

Worthing Thunder	92–93	Sheffield Sharks

Worthing Leisure Centre, Worthing

25 October 2009

Glasgow Rocks	73–78	Cheshire Jets

Northgate Arena, Chester

=== Quarter-finals ===
7 November 2009

Leicester Riders	96–87	Worcester Wolves

John Sandford Centre, Leicester

7 November 2009

Plymouth Raiders	95–101	Milton Keynes Lions

Plymouth Pavilions, Plymouth

8 November 2009

Cheshire Jets	64–61	Newcastle Eagles

Northgate Arena, Chester

20 November 2009

Sheffield Sharks	99–90	Everton Tigers

English Institute of Sport, Sheffield

=== Semi-finals 1st leg ===
27 November 2009

Milton Keynes Lions	88–84	Cheshire Jets

Bletchley Centre, Milton Keynes

11 December 2009

Sheffield Sharks	86–74	Leicester Riders

English Institute of Sport, Sheffield

=== Semi-finals 2nd leg ===
6 December 2009

Cheshire Jets	83–71	Milton Keynes Lions

Northgate Arena, Chester

12 December 2009

Leicester Riders	78–81	Sheffield Sharks

John Sanford Centre, Leicester

Cheshire Jets won 167-159 on aggregate and Sheffield Sharks won 167-152 on aggregate.

=== Final ===
17 January 2010
3.30pm GMT

Report

Cheshire Jets	86–89	Sheffield Sharks
Scoring by quarter: 18-22, 17-26, 13-16, 38-25
Pts: James Hamilton 24, Chez Marks 22, Steven Gayle 11, Colin O'Reilly 11, Jerrah Young 9, Paul Peterson 7, Shawn Myers 2		Pts: Mike Cook 19, Ryan Patton 17, Michael Tuck 15, Tafari Toney 13, Atiba Lyons 8, Perry Lawson 7, Todd Cauthorn 6, Matthew Gorman 4

National Indoor Arena, Birmingham

== BBL Trophy ==
For the 2009–10 season the Trophy saw a revamp in its format with the removal of the initial group stages in favour of a straight knockout tournament. All 13 members of the BBL were included plus three invitees from Division One of the English Basketball League, namely London Leopards, Manchester Magic and Reading Rockets.

=== First round ===
9 January 2010

Leicester Riders	72–74	Guildford Heat

John Sandford Centre, Leicester

10 January 2010

Glasgow Rocks	69–60	Sheffield Sharks

Kelvin Hall, Glasgow

12 January 2010

Milton Keynes Lions	95–73	Essex Pirates

Middleton Hall (thecentre:mk), Milton Keynes

17 January 2010

Manchester Magic	72–109	Worthing Thunder

Amaechi Centre, Manchester

20 January 2010

Plymouth Raiders	83–85	Worcester Wolves

Plymouth Pavilions, Plymouth

23 January 2010

London Capital	62–106	Everton Tigers

Capital City Academy, London

31 January 2010

Cheshire Jets	99–57	London Leopards

Northgate Arena, Chester

10 February 2010

Reading Rockets	60–102	Newcastle Eagles

Rivermead Leisure Complex, Reading

=== Quarter-finals ===
2 February 2010

Milton Keynes Lions	85–71	Worcester Wolves

Middleton Hall (thecentre:mk), Milton Keynes

11 February 2010

Glasgow Rocks	87–88	Everton Tigers

Kelvin Hall, Glasgow

14 January 2010

Worthing Thunder	86–96	Newcastle Eagles

Worthing Leisure Centre, Worthing

17 February 2010

Guildford Heat	72–79	Cheshire Jets

Guildford Spectrum, Guildford

=== Semi-finals 1st leg ===
28 February 2010

Newcastle Eagles	89–85	Everton Tigers

Metro Radio Arena, Newcastle upon Tyne

5 March 2010

Milton Keynes Lions	80–79	Cheshire Jets

Middleton Hall (thecentre:mk), Milton Keynes

=== Semi-finals 2nd leg ===
5 March 2010

Everton Tigers	91–96	Newcastle Eagles

Greenbank Sports Academy, Liverpool

14 March 2010

Cheshire Jets	102–68	Milton Keynes Lions

Northgate Arena, Chester

Newcastle Eagles won 185-176 on aggregate and Cheshire Jets won 181-148 on aggregate.

=== Final ===
21 March 2010
3.00pm GMT

Report

Newcastle Eagles	111–95	Cheshire Jets
Scoring by quarter: 24-15, 35-27, 25-21, 22-32
Pts: Charles Smith 27, Joe Chapman 21, Darius Defoe 21, Andrew Sullivan 17, Reggie Jackson 10, Andrew Bridge 7, Fab Flournoy 5, Lynard Stewart 2 Rebs: Charles Smith, 9		Pts: Shawn Myers 28, Colin O'Reilly 18, Steven Gayle 14, Chez Marks 14, Paul Peterson 7, Jerrah Young 6, Calvin Davis 4, John Simpson 4 Rebs: Shawn Myers, 14

Guildford Spectrum, Guildford

== All-Star Game ==
9 May 2010
3.00pm GMT

Great Britain All-Stars	94–110	Rest of the World All-Stars
Scoring by quarter: 25-26, 31-21, 17-29, 21-34
Pts: Tafari Toney, 23		Pts: Mike Cook, 31

National Indoor Arena, Birmingham

== Statistics leaders ==
Category	Player	Stat
Points per game	(United States) Mike Cook (Sheffield Sharks)	26.8
Rebounds per game	(United States) Jason Johnson (Leicester Riders)	10.9
Assists per game	(United Kingdom) Anthony Martin (Plymouth Raiders)	7.3
Steals per game	(United States) Roderick Middleton (Worcester Wolves)	2.7
Blocks per game	(United States) (Liberia) Kadiri Richard (Worthing Thunder)	2.3

== Monthly awards ==
Month	Coach	Player
October	(United Kingdom) Vince Macaulay (Milton Keynes Lions)	(United States) Tack Minor (Leicester Riders)
November	(United States) (United Kingdom) Atiba Lyons (Sheffield Sharks)	(United States) Mike Cook (Sheffield Sharks)
December	(United Kingdom) Tony Garbelotto (Everton Tigers)	(United States) Mike Cook (Sheffield Sharks)
January	(United States) (United Kingdom) Atiba Lyons (Sheffield Sharks)	(United States) Reggie Bratton (Worthing Thunder)
February	(United States) (United Kingdom) Fabulous Flournoy (Newcastle Eagles)	(United States) (United Kingdom) Tafari Toney (Sheffield Sharks)
March	(United States) (United Kingdom) Fabulous Flournoy (Newcastle Eagles)	(United States) Jason Johnson (Leicester Riders)

== Seasonal awards ==
- Most Valuable Player: Mike Cook (Sheffield Sharks)
- Coach of the Year: Fabulous Flournoy (Newcastle Eagles)
- Team of the Year:
  - Robert Yanders (Glasgow Rocks)
  - Mike Cook (Sheffield Sharks)
  - Charles Smith (Newcastle Eagles)
  - Jason Johnson (Leicester Riders)
  - Tafari Toney (Sheffield Sharks)
- Defensive Team of the Year:
  - Reggie Jackson (Newcastle Eagles)
  - Jessie Sapp (Glasgow Rocks)
  - Fabulous Flournoy (Newcastle Eagles)
  - Andrew Sullivan (Newcastle Eagles)
  - Tafari Toney (Sheffield Sharks)
- British Team of the Year:
  - Perry Lawson (Sheffield Sharks)
  - James Jones (Everton Tigers)
  - Olu Babalola (Everton Tigers)
  - Andrew Sullivan (Newcastle Eagles)
  - Tafari Toney (Sheffield Sharks)

Preceded by 2008–09 season	BBL seasons 2009–10	Succeeded by 2010–11 season
