= 2010–11 British Basketball League season =

2010–11 BBL season
- League: British Basketball League
- Sport: Basketball

Roll of Honour
- BBL champions: Mersey Tigers
- Play Off's champions: Mersey Tigers
- BBL Cup champions: Sheffield Sharks
- BBL Trophy champions: Mersey Tigers

British Basketball League seasons
- 2009–10 2011–12

The 2010–11 BBL season was the 24th campaign of the British Basketball League since the league's establishment in 1987. This season saw the league reduced to 12 teams with the withdrawal of London Capital during the summer and was the first campaign ever to not feature a club from the capital city London.

Unlike previous seasons the Trophy schedule usually played in January/February was brought forward, with the reintroduced group stage being played before the start of the regular season. The campaign tipped-off on 17 September 2010 with Plymouth Raiders beating Worthing Thunder 79–77 in the opening game of the Trophy. The regular league season commenced on 10 October, whilst the season closed with the showpiece Play-off Final on 30 April 2011 at the National Indoor Arena in Birmingham.

Newly rebranded Mersey Tigers won three out of the four domestic titles on offer, finishing victorious in the Franklin & Marshall Trophy, Championship and post-season Play-offs, whilst missing out on the BBL Cup following a 93–66 loss to Sheffield Sharks in the Final. Mersey's Tony Garbelotto was named as BBL Coach of the Year, whilst Cheshire Jets' Jeremy Bell was awarded the BBL's MVP award.

== Teams ==
Locations of the 2010–11 BBL teams

Team	City/Area	Arena	Capacity	Last season
Cheshire Jets	Chester	Northgate Arena	1,000	4th
Essex Pirates	Southend-on-Sea	Southend Leisure & Tennis Centre	1,100	12th
Glasgow Rocks	Glasgow	Kelvin Hall	1,200	3rd
Guildford Heat	Guildford	Surrey Sports Park	1,000	11th
Leicester Riders	Leicester	John Sandford Centre	800	6th
Mersey Tigers	Liverpool	Echo Arena	7,513	5th
Milton Keynes Lions	Milton Keynes	MK Lions Arena	1,400	7th
Newcastle Eagles	Newcastle upon Tyne	Sport Central	3,000	1st
Plymouth Raiders	Plymouth	Plymouth Pavilions	1,480	10th
Sheffield Sharks	Sheffield	English Institute of Sport	1,200	2nd
Worcester Wolves	Worcester	University of Worcester	600	9th
Worthing Thunder	Worthing	Worthing Leisure Centre	1,000	8th

== Notable occurrences ==
- After a season-long review which evaluated both the on and off-court performance of the franchise, it was announced prior to the season opening that London Capital were withdrawn from the BBL and would instead compete in the English Basketball League.
- Following Everton F.C.'s decision to cut their ties with the Tigers franchise, the team was relaunched as the Mersey Tigers prior to the start of the season along with the announcement that the Echo Arena would serve as their home venue for the first eight home games of the season.
- With further delays added to the arena:mk construction, Milton Keynes Lions sought to solve their on-going venue problems by acquiring a warehouse facility in downtown Milton Keynes to convert into a new home venue. The Lions used a court at Stoke Mandeville until the new facility – MK Lions Arena – opened midway through the season.
- Aside from Tigers and Milton Keynes, two other franchises uprooted and moved to new venues for the start of the season. After 15 years of playing out of the Metro Radio Arena, Newcastle Eagles swapped to the newly built 3,000-seat Sport Central facility at Northumbria University, whilst Guildford Heat also uprooted to the new Surrey Sports Park after 5 years at the Guildford Spectrum.
- The season started with a differing structure from previous years with the campaign tipping-off with the opening rounds of the BBL Trophy instead of regular season championship games. The decision gained a mixed reaction from coaches, with many of whom using the games as warm-ups for the regular season.
- After several years without television coverage, the League announced on 20 October that a deal had been struck with leading broadcaster Sky Sports to screen one "as live" game a week starting from 2 November, including a live broadcast of the BBL Cup Final.
- Cheshire Jets forward Matt Schneck was suspended in November after he had failed a drugs test, after traces of a prohibited substance known as Methylhexaneamine were found in his system. The player could have faced a two-year ban, but this was later reduced to three months making it the shortest ban ever handed out to an athlete for ingesting Methylhexanaemine.
- The Guildford Heat franchise was put up for sale amid a shortfall of funding, it was revealed in December, with the price of the club valued at just £1.
- In a bid to save the Guildford franchise from folding, fans of the club launched a campaign to raise £25,000 in 25 days throughout January.
- It was announced in January 2011 that this season's Trophy Final would be held at the O2 Arena, in partnership with the NBA as part of its 'Basketball Week', culminating in the Toronto Raptors versus New Jersey Nets game being played in March.
- The League announced in January that an agreement had been reached with clothing company Franklin & Marshall to sponsor the BBL Trophy Final, which would be held in March at the O2 Arena as part of the NBA's 'Basketball Week'.
- Sheffield Sharks retained the BBL Cup with a massive 93–66 win over Mersey Tigers in the Final at the National Indoor Arena in Birmingham on 16 January 2011. Sharks' American import Steve Dagostino scored 35 points and was named as the game's MVP. The game was broadcast live on Sky Sports.
- Newcastle's Kadiri Richard was crowned 2011 Slam Dunk Champion, after pipping second-place Stefan Gill (Milton Keynes) to win the annual Slam Dunk Competition on 16 January, at the National Indoor Arena.
- Surrey-based businesswoman Allison Reeve bought out the financially troubled Guildford Heat franchise in January, becoming the League's first female owner, and saving the franchise from 'imminent closure'.
- It was revealed by the media in February that Mersey Tigers had failed to pay wages to players and staff due to ongoing financial difficulties. The club released a statement about the situation, citing loss of two major sponsors and debts from previous ownership as the main reasons for its decision to delay salary payments and to relocate to temporary home venues in Liverpool and Manchester.
- Essex Pirates' 90–94 overtime victory at Worthing Thunder, on 19 February, was their first and only win of the season.
- Mersey Tigers claimed their first Franklin & Marshal Trophy title with an 84–66 victory over Guildford Heat on 5 March, at the O2 Arena in London. Tigers' Andrew Thomson scored a game-high 21 points, whilst Andrew Sullivan was awarded the Final's MVP award.
- The Championship title came down to the final game of the season, played out between Mersey Tigers and Newcastle Eagles at Sport Central on 6 April. The winner of the game would be crowned Champions and after a close contest Mersey claimed their first championship title with an 80–75 victory. Mersey were the first all-British qualified side to win the title in the BBL's 23-year history.
- Following the end of the regular season, Worthing Thunder officials confirmed that, due to financial problems, they would be withdrawing the franchise from the BBL immediately and have entered the English Basketball League for the forthcoming season.
- At the end of the season, long-serving veteran Tony Windless announced his retirement from playing basketball at the age of 41, after a career that saw him play all but two of his 16 professional seasons in the BBL, debuting with London Towers in 1994 and winning every major domestic prize.
- Newcastle's Trey Moore was crowned as the Basketball Journalists Association's (BJA) BBL Player of the Year, despite being ruled out by injury in March. Tony Garbelotto of Mersey Tigers, was awarded Coach of the Year.
- In the annual NIA All-Star Game, the Rest of the World All-Stars ran out 119–115 winners over the Great Britain All-Stars at the National Indoor Arena, in Birmingham on 30 April. Newcastle's Kadiri Richard, playing for the Rest of the World All-Stars, was awarded the MVP title after scoring 14 points, 10 rebounds and 9 assists.
- Despite going through most of the season with unpaid wages, Mersey Tigers reached the Play-off Final for the second consecutive year and beat Sheffield Sharks 79–74 to take the BBL Play-off title, their third piece of silverware this season. James Jones was named as the Final's MVP.

== BBL Championship (Tier 1) ==
=== Final standings ===
Pos	Team	Pld	W	L	%	Pts
1	Mersey Tigers	33	25	8	0.758	50
2	Newcastle Eagles	33	24	9	0.727	48
3	Sheffield Sharks	33	24	9	0.727	48
4	Cheshire Jets	33	20	13	0.606	40
5	Plymouth Raiders	33	19	14	0.576	38
6	Glasgow Rocks	33	18	15	0.545	36
7	Guildford Heat	33	17	16	0.515	34
8	Leicester Riders	33	17	16	0.515	34
9	Worcester Wolves	33	15	18	0.455	30
10	Milton Keynes Lions	33	13	20	0.394	26
11	Worthing Thunder	33	5	28	0.152	10
12	Essex Pirates	33	1	32	0.030	2

= League winners
= Qualified for the play-offs

=== Playoffs ===
==== Quarter-finals 1st leg ====
15 April 2011

Newcastle Eagles	104–97	Guildford Heat

Sport Central, Newcastle upon Tyne

15 April 2011

Sheffield Sharks	68–83	Glasgow Rocks

English Institute of Sport, Sheffield

16 April 2011

Plymouth Raiders	94–94	Cheshire Jets

Plymouth Pavilions, Plymouth

16 April 2011

Leicester Riders	86–89	Mersey Tigers

John Sandford Centre, Leicester

==== Quarter-finals 2nd leg ====
16 April 2011

Guildford Heat	83–88	Newcastle Eagles

Surrey Sports Park, Guildford

17 April 2011

Cheshire Jets	83–70	Plymouth Raiders

Northgate Arena, Chester

17 April 2011

Mersey Tigers	92–90	Leicester Riders

Amaechi Centre, Manchester

18 April 2011

Glasgow Rocks	73–94	Sheffield Sharks

Kelvin Hall, Glasgow

Cheshire Jets won series on aggregate (177–164), as did Mersey Tigers (181–176), Newcastle Eagles (192–180) and Sheffield Sharks (162–156).

==== Semi-finals 1st leg ====
22 April 2011

Newcastle Eagles	76–68	Sheffield Sharks

Sport Central, Newcastle upon Tyne

23 April 2011

Cheshire Jets	64–79	Mersey Tigers

Northgate Arena, Chester

==== Semi-finals 2nd leg ====
24 April 2011

Sheffield Sharks	98–78	Newcastle Eagles

English Institute of Sport, Sheffield

24 April 2011

Mersey Tigers	86–79	Cheshire Jets

Amaechi Centre, Manchester

Mersey Tigers won 165–143 on aggregate and Sheffield Sharks won 166–154 on aggregate.

==== Final ====
30 April 2011
4.00pm GMT

Report

Mersey Tigers	79–74	Sheffield Sharks
Scoring by quarter: 23–17, 19–18, 12–13, 25–26
Pts: Tafari Toney 19, James Jones (MVP) 15, Nate Reinking 12, David Aliu 11, Andrew Thomson 8, Jamal Williams 8, Perry Lawson 3, Andrew Sullivan 1 Rebs: Tafari Toney, 13; Asts: Andrew Thomson, 4		Pts: Ryan Patton 24, Paul Williams 17, Mike Tuck 14, Marcus Stout 9, Steve Dagostino 5, Olu Babalola 4, Atiba Lyons 1 Rebs: Mike Tuck, 8 Asts: Paul Williams/Steve Dagostino/Mike Tuck/Atiba Lyons, 2

National Indoor Arena, Birmingham

== EBL National League Division 1 (Tier 2) ==
=== Final standings ===
Pos	Team	Pld	W	L	%	Pts
1	Bristol Academy Flyers	18	15	3	0.833	30
2	London Leopards	18	14	4	0.778	28
3	Reading Rockets	18	12	6	0.667	24
4	Leeds Carnegie	18	10	8	0.556	20
5	Brixton TopCats	18	8	10	0.444	16
6	Manchester Magic	18	7	11	0.389	14
7	Durham Wildcats	18	7	11	0.389	14
8	Derby Trailblazers	18	6	12	0.333	12
9	Leicester Warriors	18	6	12	0.333	12
10	PAWS London Capital	18	5	13	0.278	10
11	Coventry Crusaders	0	0	0	0.000	0

= League winners
= Qualified for the play-offs

== EBL National League Division 2 (Tier 3) ==
=== Final standings ===
Pos	Team	Pld	W	L	%	Pts
1	Bradford Dragons	20	17	3	0.850	34
2	Tees Valley Mohawks	20	16	4	0.800	32
3	Medway Park Crusaders	20	13	7	0.650	26
4	Westminster Warriors	20	13	7	0.650	26
5	Hemel Storm	20	12	8	0.600	24
6	London United	20	11	9	0.550	22
7	Eastside Eagles	20	11	9	0.550	22
8	Team Northumbria	20	8	12	0.400	16
9	Mansfield Giants	20	6	14	0.300	12
10	City of Sheffield Arrows	20	2	18	0.100	4
11	Birmingham A's	20	1	19	0.050	2

= League winners
= Qualified for the play-offs

== BBL Cup ==
=== 1st round ===
15 October 2010

Mersey Tigers	86–74	Guildford Heat

Echo Arena, Liverpool

17 October 2010

Worthing Thunder	78–88	Worcester Wolves

Worthing Leisure Centre, Worthing

16 October 2010

Plymouth Raiders	106–101	Milton Keynes Lions

Plymouth Pavilions, Plymouth

16 October 2010

Essex Pirates	58–85	Leicester Riders

Southend Leisure & Tennis Centre, Southend-on-Sea

=== Quarter-finals ===
7 November 2010

Glasgow Rocks	78–82	Mersey Tigers

Kelvin Hall, Glasgow

12 November 2010

Newcastle Eagles	105–76	Worcester Wolves

Sport Central, Newcastle upon Tyne

12 November 2010

Sheffield Sharks	96–84	Plymouth Raiders

English Institute of Sport, Sheffield

14 November 2010

Cheshire Jets	109–100	Leicester Riders

Northgate Arena, Chester

=== Semi-finals 1st leg ===
19 November 2010

Newcastle Eagles	97–90	Mersey Tigers

Sport Central, Newcastle upon Tyne

5 December 2010

Cheshire Jets	85–107	Sheffield Sharks

Northgate Arena, Chester

=== Semi-finals 2nd leg ===
24 November 2010

Mersey Tigers	114–85	Newcastle Eagles

Echo Arena, Liverpool

10 December 2010

Sheffield Sharks	97–80	Cheshire Jets

English Institute of Sport, Sheffield

Mersey Tigers win 204–182 on aggregate and Sheffield Sharks won 204–165 on aggregate.

=== Final ===
16 January 2011
3.30pm GMT

Report

Mersey Tigers	66–93	Sheffield Sharks
Scoring by quarter: 10–20, 15–31, 21–23, 20–19
Pts: David Aliu 21, Drew Sullivan 17, Andrew Thomson 9, Jamal Williams 8, Tafari Toney 7, Sam Bogucki 2, James Jones 2 Rebs: Andrew Thomson, 8 Asts: Andrew Sullivan/Perry Lawson, 2		Pts: Steve Dagostino 35, Mike Tuck 18, Olu Babalola 14, Paul Williams 8, Marcus Stout 7, Ryan Patton 5, Atiba Lyons 4, Adrian Anderson 2 Rebs: Olu Babalola, 5 Asts: Olu Babalola, 4

National Indoor Arena, Birmingham

== Franklin & Marshall Trophy ==
=== Group stage ===
Group 1

Team	Pts	Pld	W	L	Percent
1.Guildford Heat	6	4	3	1	0.750
2.Plymouth Raiders	4	4	2	2	0.500
3.Worthing Thunder	2	4	1	3	0.250

Group 3

Team	Pts	Pld	W	L	Percent
1.Mersey Tigers	8	4	4	0	1.000
2.Cheshire Jets	2	4	1	3	0.250
3.Worcester Wolves	2	4	1	3	0.250

Group 2

Team	Pts	Pld	W	L	Percent
1.Leicester Riders	8	4	4	0	1.000
2.Milton Keynes Lions	4	4	2	2	0.500
3.Essex Pirates	0	4	0	4	0.000

Group 4

Team	Pts	Pld	W	L	Percent
1.Newcastle Eagles	6	4	3	1	0.750
2.Sheffield Sharks	4	4	2	2	0.500
3.Glasgow Rocks	2	4	1	3	0.250

=== Semi-finals 1st leg ===
30 October 2010

Guildford Heat	85–65	Leicester Riders

Surrey Sports Park, Guildford

19 November 2010

Newcastle Eagles	97–90	Mersey Tigers

Sport Central, Newcastle upon Tyne

=== Semi-finals 2nd leg ===
6 November 2010

Leicester Riders	94–87	Guildford Heat

John Sanford Centre, Leicester

24 November 2010

Mersey Tigers	114–85	Newcastle Eagles

Echo Arena, Liverpool

Guildford Heat win 172–159 on aggregate and Mersey Tigers won 204–182 on aggregate.

=== Final ===
5 March 2011
1.30pm GMT

Report

Guildford Heat	66–84	Mersey Tigers
Scoring by quarter: 18–20, 19–16, 8–29, 21–19
Pts: Carlos Medlock 18, Julius Joseph 14, Michael Martin 10, Ralph Hegamin 9, Martelle Mclemore 9, Tayo Ogedegebe 4, Dean Williams 2 Rebs: Tomas Janusauskas, 5 Asts: Carlos Medlock, 4		Pts: Andrew Thomson 21, Andrew Sullivan 16, Tafari Toney 13, Nate Reinking 12, David Aliu 10, James Jones 8, Jamal Williams 3, Perry Lawson 1 Rebs: Tafari Toney, 9 Asts: Andrew Sullivan, 8

O2 Arena, London

== NIA All-Star Game ==
30 April 2011
1.30pm GMT

Report

Great Britain All-Stars	115–119	Rest of the World All-Stars

National Indoor Arena, Birmingham

== Statistics leaders ==
Category	Player	Stat
Points per game	(United States) Trey Moore (Newcastle Eagles)	23.0
Rebounds per game	(United States) Matt Schneck (Cheshire Jets)	10.2
Assists per game	(United States) Trey Moore (Newcastle Eagles)	6.1
Steals per game	(United States) Demarius Bolds (Milton Keynes Lions)	2.8
Blocks per game	(United States) (Liberia) Kadiri Richard (Newcastle Eagles)	1.36

== Monthly awards ==
Month	Coach	Player
October	(United Kingdom) Tony Garbelotto (Mersey Tigers)	(United States) Trey Moore (Newcastle Eagles)
November	(Zimbabwe) Creon Raftopoulos (Guildford Heat)	(United Kingdom) Andrew Sullivan (Mersey Tigers)
December	(United Kingdom) Gavin Love (Plymouth Raiders)	(United States) Chez Marks (Plymouth Raiders)
January	(United States) (United Kingdom) Sterling Davis (Glasgow Rocks)	(United States) Trey Moore (Newcastle Eagles)
February	(United States) (Italy) Rob Paternostro (Leicester Riders)	(Trinidad and Tobago) (United Kingdom) Shawn Myers (Milton Keynes Lions)
March	(United Kingdom) Tony Garbelotto (Mersey Tigers)	(United States) Reggie Jackson (Newcastle Eagles)

== Seasonal awards ==
- Molten Most Valuable Player: Jeremy Bell (Cheshire Jets)
- Molten Coach of the Year: Tony Garbelotto (Mersey Tigers)
- Team of the Year:
  - Trey Moore (Newcastle Eagles)
  - Jeremy Bell (Cheshire Jets)
  - Charles Smith (Newcastle Eagles)
  - Quemont Greer (Cheshire Jets)
  - Andrew Sullivan (Mersey Tigers)
- Defensive Team of the Year:
  - Reggie Jackson (Newcastle Eagles)
  - Demarius Bolds (Milton Keynes Lions)
  - Andrew Sullivan (Mersey Tigers)
  - Kadiri Richard (Newcastle Eagles)
  - Tafari Toney (Mersey Tigers)
- British Team of the Year:
  - Nate Reinking (Mersey Tigers)
  - Andrew Sullivan (Mersey Tigers)
  - Anthony Rowe (Plymouth Raiders)
  - Andrew Thomson (Mersey Tigers)
  - Tafari Toney (Mersey Tigers)

Preceded by 2009–10 season	BBL seasons 2010–11	Succeeded by 2011–12 season
