= Anthony Martin (basketball) =

British basketball player

Anthony Martin (born 24 August 1980) is a British professional basketball player, who plays for the Newcastle Eagles in the British Basketball League.

== Biography ==
The 6 ft tall point guard began his career with the BBL Championship winning Chester Jets team of the 2004/05 season, making his debut in a home match against Sheffield Sharks on 1 October 2004. He also helped the team to the Play-off final that season, eventually losing to Newcastle Eagles, 75–78.

By his second season, he had commanded a place in the starting five, and averaging an impressive 81% on free-throws and 55% from the floor, whilst also tallying 12.2points in 23.72 minutes-per-game. Sadly, Martin missed the 2006/07 season through injury, but after fully recovering was announced as a surprise signing for the Plymouth Raiders during the 2007 close season, ironically coming in as a replacement for long-term injured captain Gavin Love.

He quickly filled the void left by Love, and although faced some stiff competition from fellow new guard signing Brody Bishop and long-serving Raider Allister Gall, cemented his place in the first team. His blistering pace is the cornerstone of his game, and Raiders' head coach has claimed him to be the fastest player in the league, while other comparisons to NBA star Chris Paul have also been drawn.

For the start of the 09–10 season Anthony signed for Worcester Wolves however things did not seem to work out for him as part of new coach Chuck Evans' team. Upon being released from his contract (by mutual consent) coach Gary Stronach moved quickly to secure Anthony's return to the South West's premiere basketball club.

On 4 September 2012, Martin signed for Newcastle Eagles to provide competition in the Point Guard position to Damon Huffman.

Martin last played on the BBL during the 2012–13 season.
