= Roderick Wellington =

British basketball player

Roderick Wellington also known as "The Duke" (born in Tooting, England) was a British professional basketball player, and played for the Leicester Riders in the British Basketball League amongst others.

The 6 ft 5in tall Forward was educated at Marjon College, based in Plymouth and it was here where he started his professional basketball career with the Plymouth Raiders in 2000, then a National Basketball League team, having previously played for lower league club Sutton Pumas.

After enjoying four very successful years with the Raiders, Roderick made the jump to the top-level British Basketball League with teammate Dean Williams, both of whom joined the Thames Valley Tigers in 2004, the same year that the Raiders also made the jump to the BBL. After one season with the Tigers, the club folded and through the efforts of local fans a new club was set up to replace them, the Guildford Heat, of which Rod was a part of the first roster of the new club.

At the beginning of the 2006-07 season, after failing to sort out a contract with the Heat, Wellington signed for English Basketball League (second-tier) team Worthing Thunder where he played for two months, before re-signing with the Heat in November 2006.

Wellington enjoyed an immensely successful second season with the Heat, helping the team on the road to BBL Cup victory and the BBL League Championship. Ensuring he would 'go out at the top', Rod made the "long and difficult" decision to retire during the summer of 2007, only to revert his choice several months later to sign a contract with BBL veterans Leicester Riders. Roderick is now retired from Basketball and lives back in the South of England.

== Career history ==
=== Professional career ===
- 2007-08 (United Kingdom) Leicester Riders
- 2006-07 (United Kingdom) Guildford Heat
- 2006 (United Kingdom) Worthing Thunder
- 2005-06 (United Kingdom) Guildford Heat
- 2004-05 (United Kingdom) Thames Valley Tigers
- 2000-04 (United Kingdom) Plymouth Raiders
- 1999-00 (United Kingdom) Sutton Pumas

=== International career ===
- England (7 caps)
