= Essex Pirates =

- League: British Basketball League
- Established: 2009
- Folded: 2011
- History: Essex Pirates; 2009-2011
- Arena: Southend Leisure Centre
- Capacity: 1,100
- Location: Southend-on-Sea, Essex
- Ownership: (United Kingdom) Tim Lewis
Home	Away

The Essex Pirates were a British Basketball League team from Southend-on-Sea, in the county of Essex. They were founded in 2009 and played their home games at the Southend Leisure & Tennis Centre. Following the loss of a major sponsor, the franchise withdrew from the league just two weeks prior to the start of the 2011-12 season and have remained inactive since, with much of their former fan-base now following Essex Leopards.

== History ==
=== Basketball in Essex ===
Prior to the creation of the Pirates franchise in 2009, the county of Essex had previous flirtations with top-level basketball through the Essex Leopards franchise, still a synonymous name with the area. After mounting costs forced the Greater London Leopards to look away from their traditional London Arena home, the franchise moved out of London and settled for a new nest in Brentwood in 1998. The venture lasted for five seasons before the club folded, to be replaced with the supporter-backed Essex & Herts Leopards in 2004. Though many fans consider it to be a direct continuation of the Leopards name, the new club was, in fact, a separate entity, formed from the rubble of the Ware Rebels. The club have risen to prominence in the lower leagues of the English Basketball League, and are currently found alternating between venues in Brentwood and Basildon Sporting Village.

The foundations of the new franchise were already in place through the Essex Basketball Club's Advanced Apprentice-ship in Sporting Excellence (AASE) basketball training programme which was present at the South East Essex College, and the ambitious plans spearheaded by the programmes’ operator Great Britain Under 20's coach Tim Lewis.

=== Pirates set sail ===
The application to the British Basketball League, the country's top league, was formally accepted on 11 June 2009, as well as plans to operate several initiatives alongside the BBL team and the existing AASE programme, included an England Basketball Division Four development team and a non-profit community coaching company to deliver coaching into primary schools across the county. The following months saw plenty of action and preparation in time for the inaugural season, and the club announced their first signings in August, with the inclusion of Spaniard starlet Pablo Rodrigo, British international Kyle Dodds and BBL veteran Dean Williams, formerly of Guildford, London Towers and Thames Valley Tigers becoming the first names on the roster. The eventual team sheet would be one centred on young, homegrown players, with the roster being predominantly British ranging from the ages of 20 to 26.

The new team took to their home court at Southend Leisure & Tennis Centre for the first time on 3 October, in a home league encounter with London Capital, eventually going on to win a tight affair 61–60, despite being up 49–37 at the end of the 3rd quarter. Pirates 6ft11 forward Alan Metclalfe led the games’ scoring with 21 points, while Pablo Rodrigo and Colin Sing both fouled out within the last 2 minutes. Pirates secured their first away win a few weeks later on 15 October, with an 82–88 victory against the Worthing Thunder, Taner Adu of the Pirates posted 29 points for the visitors. On 27 November, the club announced the signing of former Plymouth Raiders guard, Haggai Hundert.

== Home arenas ==
Southend Leisure & Tennis Centre (2009-2011)

== Season-by-season records ==
Season	Division	Tier	Regular Season						Post-Season	Trophy	Cup	Head coach
Season	Division	Tier	Finish	Played	Wins	Losses	Points	Win %	Post-Season	Trophy	Cup	Head coach
Essex Pirates
2009–10	BBL	1	12th	36	7	29	14	0.194	Did not qualify	1st round (BT)	1st round (BC)	Tim Lewis
2010–11	BBL	1	12th	33	1	32	2	0.030	Did not qualify	1st round (BT)	1st round (BC)	Tim Lewis

== Notable former players ==
- (New Zealand) Josh Clark
- (United Kingdom) Myles Hesson
- (Israel) (United Kingdom) Haggai Hundert
- (United Kingdom) Marcus Knight
- (United Kingdom) Walid Mumuni
- (Spain) Pablo Rodrigo
- (United Kingdom) Dean Williams
- (Italy) David Celestini
