= Dean Williams (basketball) =

English basketball player

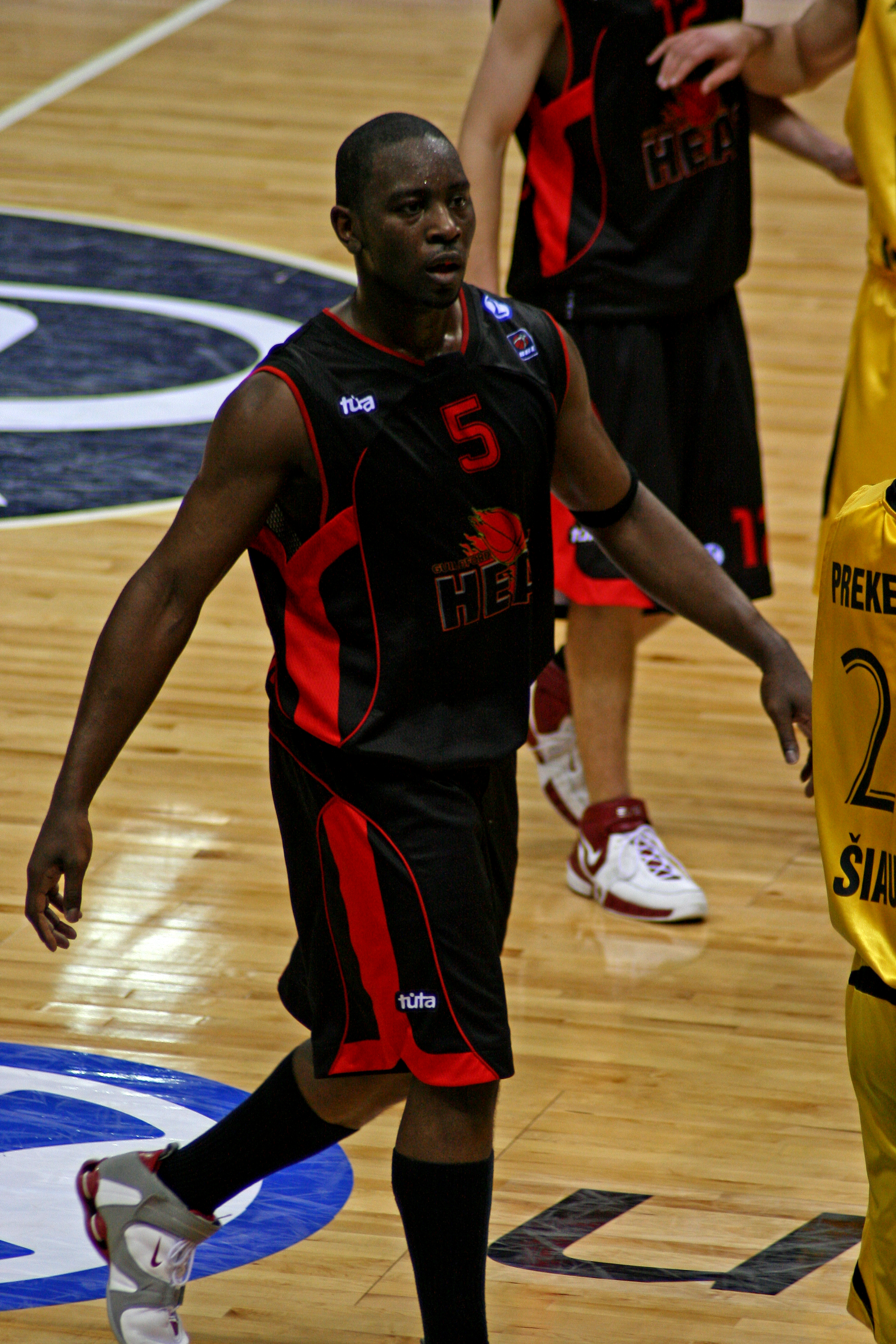

Dean Williams (born 17 February 1977 in England) is a British former professional basketball player. He used to play for Reading Rockets and he is now teaching maths in Jumeirah College in Dubai.

The 6 ft 3 in tall Guard was educated at Marjon's and has played internationally for the England national team. Williams started his professional basketball career for the London Towers, having previously played for the amateur club Brixton Topcats.

He left the Towers in 2000 to join National Basketball League team the Plymouth Raiders, where he spent four successful seasons before moving back into the top-flight with teammate Roderick Wellington, both of whom joined British Basketball League team the Thames Valley Tigers in 2004, the same year that the Raiders also made the jump to the BBL. After one season with the Tigers, the club folded, and through the efforts of local fans a new club was set up to replace them, the Guildford Heat, of which Dean was a part of the first roster of the new club. In 2009, Williams moved to newly created Essex Pirates to become part of their first roster, just like at Guildford 4 years earlier. He played for Guildford Heat until the end of the 2011/12 season. He joined Reading Rockets at the start of the 2012/13 season. During the 2012/2013 season, Dean suffered a knee injury, a partially torn ACL. He had surgery, which was successful. Following the surgery, Dean decided to focus on his career as a Maths teacher. He is currently a successful full-time mathematics teacher at Jumeirah College in Dubai, UAE, teaching Ks3, GCSE and A-Levels.
