= Andreas Schreiber =

Swedish basketball player

Free agent
- Position: Power forward / center

Personal information
- Born: July 21, 1987 (age 39) Santa Cruz, California
- Listed height: 6 ft 10 in (2.08 m)
- Listed weight: 245 lb (111 kg)

Career information
- High school: Brentwood School (Los Angeles, California)
- College: Penn (2006–2011)
- NBA draft: 2011: undrafted
- Playing career: 2011–present

Career history
- 2011–2012: Tarragona
- 2012: Sundsvall Dragons
- 2012: Vendée Challans Basket
- 2013: Plymouth Raiders
- 2013–2014: Worcester Wolves
- 2014: Oviedo
- 2014–2015: Navarra
- 2015: Zornotza

Martin Andreas Schreiber (born July 21, 1987) is a Swedish basketball player who last played for Zornotza ST in the Spanish third division. He is 208 cm (6"10 ft) tall in shoes and can play both the center and the power forward position. Before moving to Europe to play professionally, he played college basketball at the University of Pennsylvania. Schreiber was born in Santa Cruz, California but moved at an early age to Täby, a suburb of Stockholm, Sweden. He currently holds a dual citizenship with the United States and Sweden, and also plays for the Swedish national basketball team.

== High school career ==
=== In Sweden ===
Before moving to United States to complete high school at Brentwood School, Schreiber played for his home club team Täby Basket and later joined 08 Stockholm Junior Team. While at Täby Basket he won two Swedish National Championships for boys born 1986 (even though he is born 1987) and became an all-star, as well as an MVP. After switching high school to Fryshuset and joining its associated junior basketball team 08 Stockholm Junior Team, Schreiber would win yet another Swedish National Championship (for boys born 1987) and help his team finish in 5th place as well as grab an all-star award in the Northern European Youth Basketball League (NEYBL).

=== In the United States ===
Schreiber played basketball at the prestigious private school Brentwood School located in Westwood, Los Angeles. While at Brentwood, he would come to win several all-star rewards and was a McDonald's All-American Nominee his senior year. Schreiber would average 11 points, 9 rebounds and 4 blocks his junior year, and 15 points, and 9 rebounds his senior year, while shooting over 36% from the three-point line.

== College career ==
Schreiber played at Penn from 2006 to 2011. As a freshman, he appeared in 16 games, scoring his first collegiate points off a three-pointer against the Syracuse Orange. Schreiber would become an Ivy League Champion in 2007, thus earning an automatic bid to the 2006/2007 NCAA Men's Division I Basketball Championship in Kentucky. This would come to be the last Penn championship team up to date.

As a sophomore, Schreiber appeared in all 31 games, starting 15 (including 10 of the last 11), and averaged 5.5 points, and 3.9 rebounds per game. He led the Quakers and seventh in the Ivy League in blocked shots (28/0.90 per game), and additionally led Penn in scoring three times, and in rebounding nine times. He would also reach double-figure scoring games five times. Schreiber's best game came against Cornell, where he scored 23 points and grabbed nine rebounds.

Schreiber would be shut down his junior and senior season due to a recurring shoulder injury. He would gain a medical redshirt for his senior year, allowing him a 5th year of eligibility.

As a supersenior, Schreiber would start his first six games but missed most of the remainder of the season due to a spiral fracture in his left hand.

== Professional career ==
=== 2011/2012 ===
After graduating with an environmental science degree, Schreiber went to Spain to play for CB Tarragona in the second division known as the Liga Española de Baloncesto (LEB Oro). There he averaged 7.1 points per game, 4.1 rebounds per game, while shooting 53% from the field. Schreiber had two double-doubles, coming via point-rebound combination.

=== 2012/2013 ===
After one season in Spain, Schreiber returned to Sweden in 2012 and signed for Sundsvall Dragons. He played 11 games in his homeland, averaging 5 points and 4.5 rebounds per game. In November 2012 he moved to France, temporarily signing for the French team Vendée Challans Basket, of the Ligue Nationale 1. He left a month later, before signing on as a free agent for British Basketball League team Plymouth Raiders in January 2013. Schreiber played 20 games for the Raiders, averaging 12.5 points, 8.6 rebounds, 1.8 blocks per game, while shooting 80% from the free throw line. He had six double-doubles, coming via point-rebound combination. Schreiber played an integral part in bringing the Raiders to the 2013 play-off semifinals, and was also named as the '13 Eurobasket BBL Bosman Player of the Year.

=== 2013/2014 ===
Schreiber agreed to be released from his contract at Plymouth in October 2013, promptly after his former coach Gavin Love was let go. Shortly after, Schreiber was snapped up by rivals Worcester Wolves who would make history by winning the 2014 BBL Trophy Final and the 2014 BBL Playoff Championships. He played 18 games for the Wolves, averaging 9.8 points, 6.8 rebounds, and 1.1 blocks per game as a starting five, while also shooting the second highest free-throw percentage on the team at 76.6%.

=== 2014/2015 ===
Schreiber would return to Spain to play for Oviedo CB in the Liga Española de Baloncesto. He played 12 games, averaging 6 points and 4 rebounds in 14 minutes per game. Schreiber would leave Oviedo CB for Basket Navarra Club but would leave a month later, before finally signing with Zornotza ST in the LEB Plata in February 2015. Schreiber played 16 games for Zornotza, averaging 8.3 points, 5 rebounds, while shooting 52% from the field, including 40% from the three-point line, and second highest free-throw percentage on the team at 78%. Schreiber would be part of history, as he helped take his team to the Semifinals of the LEB Plata Playoffs for the first time ever.

== National team ==
Andreas Schreiber also plays for the Swedish national basketball team. Prior to that, he has played in several Swedish youth national teams, and additionally represented Sweden in the 2004 U18 Albert Schweitzer Tournament (also known as the unofficial world championships). He joined the senior Swedish national team in 2011 and played in the Eurobasket 2011 Division B, where he averaged 5.8 points, 5.0 rebounds, and 2.5 steals per game. Schreiber is currently on the 24 man roster, scheduled to play the 2013 European Championship in Slovenia.

== Personal life ==
Andreas Schreiber is currently the owner of Evoke Socks, a for-profit cashmere dress sock company, and the Prolete Formula, an inspirational lifestyle brand for young athletes.
