= Burchell =

Burchell is a surname and more rarely a given name. It may refer to:

== People ==
=== Surname ===
- Beau Burchell (born 1978), American musician and record producer
- Charles Jost Burchell (1876–1967), Canadian diplomat
- David Godwin Burchell (1924–2009), South Australian businessman, recreational scuba diver and Australian rules football administrator
- Francis Burchell (1874–1947), English cricketer
- Fred Burchell (baseball) (1879–1951), American baseball pitcher
- Fred Burchell (ice hockey) (1931–1998), Canadian ice hockey player
- Hannah Burchell (born 1995), Australian rules footballer
- Jamie Burchell (born 1979), British basketball player
- Joe Burchell (1873–1932), English football manager
- Nekeisha Burchell, Jamaican politician
- Reginald Burchell (1883–1955), Australian politician
- Remona Burchell (born 1991), Jamaican sprinter
- Richard Burchell (1943–2020), American politician
- Thomas Burchell (1799–1846), Baptist missionary and slavery abolitionist in Jamaica
- Thomas Burchell (cricketer) (1875–1951), English cricketer
- William John Burchell (1781–1863), English explorer and naturalist

=== Pen name ===
- Mary Burchell, pen name of romance novelist Ida Cook (1904–1986)

=== Given name ===
- Burchell Whiteman (born 1938), Jamaican politician

== Fictional characters ==
- Mr. Burchell, in Oliver Goldsmith's novel The Vicar of Wakefield.
- Burchell Clemens, alter ego of Marvel Comics villain Cottonmouth

== See also ==
- Burchell Lake, Ontario, Canada, a ghost town

Species named for William John Burchell:

- Burchell's coucal
- Burchell's courser
- Burchell's starling
- Burchell's redfin
- Burchell's sandgrouse
- Burchell's zebra
