= Adu =

ADU or Adu may refer to:

== Universities ==
- Abu Dhabi University
- Adamson University of Manila
- Afghan Defense University, now called Marshal Fahim National Defense University
- Animal Demography Unit, University of Cape Town
- ArsDigita University at MIT

== Other uses ==
- Adu (surname), with a list of people of that name
- Adú, 2020 Spanish film
- Ädu, village in Otepää Parish, Valga County, Estonia
- Accessory dwelling unit or secondary suite
- Ammonium diuranate, in yellowcake production
- Analog-to-digital converter or Analog-to-digital unit
- Application discovery and understanding, for software maintenance
- Ardabil Airport in Ardabil Province, Iran (IATA airport code ADU)
