= Jamie Burchell =

British basketball player

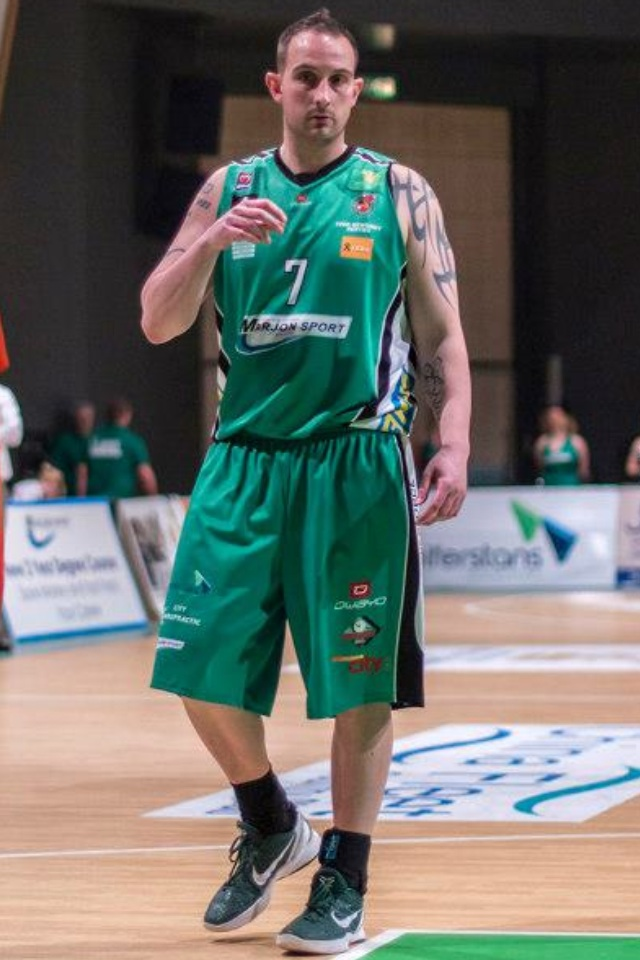
Burchell, playing for Plymouth Raiders during the 2012/2013 season.

Jamie Burchell (born 15 November 1979 in Worcester, England) is a retired British professional basketball player, who most notably played for the Plymouth Raiders in the British Basketball League.

The 6ft5 Forward was educated at The Royal Grammar School, Worcester and later at Marjon's, where he won a BUCS National Championship and represented England Universities. Burchell ended his career at Plymouth Raiders in the Summer of 2013 after representing the club for nearly 15 years. An Anterior Cruciate Ligament injury in February 2011 essentially ended his career, although he would take part in the BBL 2012/2013 campaign. He had previously donned the green vest from 1999 to 2002, before returning in 2003 following a spell at Chester Jets. Jamie also played for Solihull Chiefs during the 1998/99 season.

Burchell now works as a primary school Class Teacher at Stoke Climsland School in south-east Cornwall.
