= Trey Moore =

Trey Moore may refer to:

- Trey Moore (baseball) (born 1972), American baseball pitcher
- Trey Moore (basketball) (born 1975), American basketball player
- Trey Moore (American football) (born 2003), American football defensive end
