= Battersea College =

Battersea College may refer to:

- Battersea College of Domestic Science (1948 to 1965), predecessor of London South Bank University
- Battersea College of Education (1965 to 1976), predecessor of London South Bank University
- Battersea College of Technology (1956 to 1966), predecessor of the University of Surrey
- Battersea Training College (1840 to 1879), later St John's College, Battersea, predecessor of Plymouth Marjon University
