= Adu (name) =

Adu is a given name and surname. Notable people with the name include:

== Given name ==
- Adu Celso (1945–2005), Brazilian motorcycle road racer

== Surname ==
- Albert Adu Boahen (1932–2006), Ghanaian academic, historian and politician
- Aletha Adu, British journalist
- Enoch Kofi Adu (born 1990), Ghanaian footballer
- Francis Adu Amanfoh (or Francis Amanfoh), Ghanaian general and diplomat
- Freddy Adu (born 1989), Ghanaian-born American soccer player
- Hans Adu Sarpei (or Hans Sarpei) (born 1976), Ghanaian-German footballer
- Jab Adu (1932–2016), Nigerian actor
- Kofi Adu (born 1969), Ghanaian actor and comedian
- Richard Adu-Bobie (born 1985), Canadian sprinter
- Sade Adu (born 1959), British musician
- Skelley Adu Tutu (born 1979), Ghanaian footballer
- Taner Adu (born 1984), English basketball player
