= 2004–05 British Basketball League season =

2004–05 BBL season
- League: British Basketball League
- Sport: Basketball

Roll of Honour
- BBL champions: Chester Jets
- Play Off's champions: Newcastle Eagles
- BBL Cup champions: Brighton Bears
- BBL Trophy champions: Newcastle Eagles

British Basketball League seasons
- 2003–04 2005–06

The 2004–05 BBL season was the 18th campaign in the history of the British Basketball League, which commenced on 2 October 2004, and ended with Newcastle Eagles' win in the Play-off Final on 1 May 2005. Eagles won their first piece of silverware in 13 years with victories in the play-offs and the BBL Trophy, against Brighton Bears on their home court at The Brighton Centre.

The League saw the addition of a new franchise for the first time in eight years – when Edinburgh Rocks joined in 1998 – with Plymouth Raiders stepping up from the English Basketball League Division 1.

== Teams ==
Team	City/Area	Arena	Capacity	Last season
Birmingham Bullets	Birmingham	North Solihull Sports Centre	1,000	10th
Brighton Bears	Brighton	Brighton Centre & Burgess Hill Triangle	3,600; 1,800	1st
Chester Jets	Chester	Northgate Arena	1,000	5th
Leicester Riders	Leicester	John Sanford Centre	800	9th
London Towers	London	Crystal Palace National Sports Centre	1,500	3rd
Milton Keynes Lions	Milton Keynes	Bletchley Centre	800	8th
Newcastle Eagles	Newcastle upon Tyne	Metro Radio Arena	6,500	6th
Plymouth Raiders	Plymouth	Plymouth Pavilions	1,480	New
Sheffield Sharks	Sheffield	Ponds Forge	1,600	2nd
Scottish Rocks	Glasgow	Braehead Arena	4,000	4th
Thames Valley Tigers	Bracknell	John Nike Sports Centre	1,000	7th

== Notable occurrences ==
- Following the withdrawal of major sponsor, Brighton Bears pulled out of the FIBA Europe League just weeks before the start of the tournament, meaning that no British teams would be competing in European competition for the current season.
- Plymouth Raiders played, and won, their first game in the BBL on 2 October 2004, beating the visiting Milton Keynes Lions in a low-scoring game that finished 63–46 in favour of the rookies.
- The first piece of silverware up for gabs, the BBL Cup, was won by Brighton Bears after defeating Scottish Rocks, 90–74 in the final at the National Indoor Arena, in Birmingham.
- Newcastle Eagles won their first title in 13 years after upsetting Brighton in the BBL Trophy Final, which was played at The Brighton Centre. Eagles ran out 85–60 winners in a very one-sided spectacle.
- Leicester Riders moved back to the city of Leicester after securing a venue and sponsorship with De Montfort University.

== BBL championship (Tier 1) ==
=== Final standings ===
Pos	Team	Pld	W	L	%	Pts
1	Chester Jets	40	32	8	0.800	64
2	Newcastle Eagles	40	31	9	0.775	62
3	London Towers	40	29	11	0.725	58
4	Sheffield Sharks	40	26	14	0.650	52
5	Brighton Bears	40	22	18	0.550	44
6	Scottish Rocks	40	19	21	0.475	38
7	Thames Valley Tigers	40	18	22	0.450	36
8	Milton Keynes Lions	40	15	25	0.375	30
9	Plymouth Raiders	40	12	28	0.300	24
10	Leicester Riders	40	11	29	0.275	22
11	Birmingham Bullets	40	5	35	0.125	10

= League winners
= Qualified for the play-offs

=== Playoffs ===
Quarter-finals
1	Chester Jets	81
8	Milton Keynes Lions	71
3	London Towers	63
6	Scottish Rocks	65
2	Newcastle Eagles	105
7	Thames Valley Tigers	72
4	Sheffield Sharks	91
5	Brighton Bears	56

Semi-finals
1	Chester Jets	74
6	Scottish Rocks	72
2	Newcastle Eagles	75
4	Sheffield Sharks	65

Final
1	Chester Jets	75
2	Newcastle Eagles	78

==== Quarter-finals ====
15 April 2005

Newcastle Eagles	105–72	Thames Valley Tigers

Telewest Arena, Newcastle upon Tyne

16 April 2005

London Towers	63–65	Scottish Rocks

Crystal Palace National Sports Centre, London

16 April 2005

Sheffield Sharks	91–56	Brighton Bears

Ponds Forge, Sheffield

17 April 2005

Chester Jets	81–71	Milton Keynes Lions

Northgate Arena, Chester

==== Semi-finals ====
30 April 2005

Chester Jets	74–72	Scottish Rocks

National Indoor Arena, Birmingham

30 April 2005

Newcastle Eagles	75–65	Sheffield Sharks

National Indoor Arena, Birmingham

==== Final ====
1 May 2005

Report

Chester Jets	75–78	Newcastle Eagles
Scoring by quarter: 14–13, 24–24, 22–18, 15–23
Pts: Trey Moore 20, DJ Harrison 14, Billy Singleon 13		Pts: Andrew Sullivan (MVP) 27, TJ Walker 15, Frank Bennett 9, Jeremy Hyatt 9, Charles Smith 9

National Indoor Arena, Birmingham
Attendance: ?
Jets coach Paul Smith
Eagles coach Fab Flournoy

== EBL National League Division 1 (Tier 2) ==
=== Final standings ===
Pos	Team	Pld	W	L	%	Pts
1	City of Sheffield Arrows	22	21	1	0.955	42
2	London United	22	18	4	0.818	36
3	Reading Rockets	22	16	6	0.727	32
4	Worcester Wolves	22	13	9	0.591	26
5	Worthing Thunder	22	13	9	0.591	26
6	Manchester Magic	22	12	10	0.545	24
7	Teesside Mohawks	22	10	12	0.455	20
8	Essex & Herts Leopards	22	9	13	0.409	18
9	PAWS London Capital	22	7	15	0.318	14
10	Solent Stars	22	5	17	0.227	10
11	Kingston Wildcats	22	5	17	0.227	10
12	Coventry Crusaders	22	3	19	0.136	6

= League winners
= Qualified for the play-offs

== EBL National League Division 2 (Tier 3) ==
=== Final standings ===
Pos	Team	Pld	W	L	%	Pts
1	Nottingham Knights	20	18	2	0.900	36
2	Mansfield Express	20	15	5	0.750	30
3	West Hertfordshire Warriors	20	14	6	0.700	28
4	King's Lynn Fury	20	13	7	0.650	26
5	Liverpool	20	9	11	0.450	18
6	Colchester United	20	8	12	0.400	16
7	Bath Romans	20	8	12	0.400	16
8	Leicester Phoenix	20	8	12	0.400	16
9	Northampton Neptunes	20	7	13	0.350	14
10	Hackney White Heat	20	5	15	0.250	10
11	Tamar Valley Cannons	20	4	16	0.200	8

= League winners
= Qualified for the play-offs

== BBL Cup ==
=== First round ===
Team 1	Team 2	Score
Leicester Riders	Thames Valley Tigers	77-95
Birmingham Bullets	Plymouth Raiders	73-75
London Towers	Newcastle Eagles	84-86

=== Semi-finals ===
Team 1	Team 2	Score
Brighton Bears	Milton Keynes Lions	78-68
Scottish Rocks	Chester Jets	90-75

=== Final ===
16 January 2005

Report

Brighton Bears	90–74	Scottish Rocks
Pts: Andrew Alleyne (MVP) 27, Ryan Huntley 22, Tony Holley 14, Steve Lepore 8, Yorick Williams 8, Ajou Deng 8, Rahdi Knapp 3		Pts: Donald Cole 22, Tony Windless 13, Adrian Henning 10, Lamont McIntosh 10, Philip Perre 10, Roni Gordon 6, Dan Wardrope 3

National Indoor Arena, Birmingham
Attendance: ?
Bears coach Nick Nurse
Rocks coach Steve Swanson

== BBL Trophy ==
=== Group stage ===
Northern Group 1

Team	Pts	Pld	W	L	Percent
1.Newcastle Eagles	8	4	4	0	1.000
2.Scottish Rocks	4	4	2	2	0.500
3.Teesside Mohawks	0	4	0	4	0.000

Southern Group 1

Team	Pts	Pld	W	L	Percent
1.London Towers	8	4	4	0	1.000
2.Milton Keynes Lions	2	4	1	3	0.250
3.Birmingham Bullets	2	4	1	3	0.250

Northern Group 2

Team	Pts	Pld	W	L	Percent
1.Chester Jets	6	4	3	1	0.750
2.Sheffield Sharks	6	4	3	1	0.750
3.Leicester Riders	0	4	0	4	0.000

Southern Group 2

Team	Pts	Pld	W	L	Percent
1.Brighton Bears	6	4	3	1	0.750
2.Plymouth Raiders	4	4	2	2	0.500
3.Thames Valley Tigers	2	4	1	3	0.250

=== Semi-finals ===
20 January 2005

Brighton Bears	87–84	London Towers

Metro Radio Arena, Newcastle

20 January 2005

Newcastle Eagles	92–87	Chester Jets

Metro Radio Arena, Newcastle

=== Final ===
6 March 2005

Report

Brighton Bears	60–85	Newcastle Eagles
Pts: Ronnie Baker 21, Steve Lepore 13, Andrew Alleyne 9 Cheyne Gadson 9		Pts: Jeremy Hyatt, 22, Charles Smith (MVP) 18, Frank Bennett 13, TJ Walker 12

Brighton Centre, Brighton
Attendance: ?
Bears coach Nick Nurse
Eagles coach Fab Flournoy

== Statistics leaders ==
Category	Player	Stat
Points per game	(United States) Trey Moore (Chester Jets)	22.8
Rebounds per game	(United States) Terrence Durham (Plymouth Raiders)	13.6
Assists per game	(United States) TJ Walker (Newcastle Eagles)	7.3

Preceded by 2003–04 BBL season	BBL seasons 2004–05	Succeeded by 2005–06 BBL season
