= Mayflower Centre (Plymouth) =

Former leisure centre in Plymouth, Devon, England

Coordinates: 50°23′10.68″N 4°9′11.88″W

The Mayflower Centre was a leisure centre in the city of Plymouth, Devon, England. It was situated in Central Park, close to Plymouth Argyle Football Club. The centre was originally built in 1971 as an exhibition centre for the 350th anniversary of the sailing of the Mayflower; it was extended several times.

In 1973 a four rink indoor bowls facility was built; this facility was home to one of the largest bowls clubs in the area. In 1979 an indoor five-a-side hall was added and as of 2006 there were over 100 teams competing in various leagues throughout the year. Four squash courts were added in 1980, two of which were later converted into a meeting training room and a kickboxing/martial art studio.

The Mayflower Centre was home to English Basketball League team the Tamar Valley Cannons and was home to Plymouth Raiders from 1983 until their move to the Plymouth Pavilions in 1996.

The Mayflower Centre was demolished to make way for the Plymouth Life Centre which opened in 2012.
