= Daniel Okonkwo =

American basketball player (born 1975)

Robert Daniel Chibuzo Okonkwo (born 1975 in Lansing) played professional basketball in England with the Plymouth Raiders. He represented also the Nigerian national team in the 1998 FIBA World Championship. A 6 feet 6 inches (1.98 m) Shooting guard, Okonkwo graduated from Yale University and signed a professional contract with the Raiders in 1997, where he played for two years before leaving to play for As Sadaka in Lebanon in 1999. Nigeria finished 13th in the 1998 World Championship.

== Yale records and awards ==
- 157 career steals, 1st overall
- 54 single season steals, 1st overall
- 683 rebounds, 7th overall
- 17th Yale men's basketball player to score over 1,000 career points.

He was awarded the following while an undergraduate:

- William Neely Mallory Award 1997, the most prestigious athletic honor given to a senior male at Yale;
- Dutch Arnold Award 1997 and 1996, most valuable player
- George McReynolds Award 1995, top defensive player
- John C. Cobb Award 1994, top freshmen player.

== See also ==
- Plymouth Raiders
