= Taner Adu =

British basketball player (born 1984)

Taner Adefemi Adu (born 22 February 1984 in London, England) is a professional basketball player who played college basketball for the University of New Orleans in the NCAA and is a former Plymouth Raiders and Essex Pirates player in the British Basketball League. Taner currently has 11 caps for the England Basketball Team.

In 2010, Taner joined, Plymouth Raiders to play at point guard.
