= Aletha Adu =

British political journalist

- Education: City, University of London (MA in Newspaper Journalism)
- Occupation: Political journalist
- Writing career
- Notable awards: Scott Trust Bursary (2015/16)

Aletha Adu is a British political journalist focused on national issues. Having started as a freelance journalist, she worked as a political correspondent at The Daily Mirror, and moved to the equivalent role at The Guardian in 2022. She was named one of the 100 most influential women in Westminster by The House in 2023 and 2024. She received a Scott Trust Bursary for 2015/16, whilst she was studying at City, University of London for an MA in Newspaper journalism. She often appears on television and radio broadcast media about British politics, including BBC Politics Live, Broadcasting House, and Sky News's Press Preview.
