= Plymouth Marjon Cannons =

- League: EBL Division 2
- Established: 2000
- Folded: 2009
- History: Tamar Valley Cannons; 2000-2007; Plymouth Marjon Cannons; 2007-2009
- Arena: Marjon Campus
- Location: Plymouth, Devon
- Team colours: Black and White
- Ownership: (United Kingdom) George Hatchell
Home	Away

Plymouth Marjon Cannons was an English amateur basketball team based in Plymouth, Devon. Following a merger between Cannons and Plymouth Raiders II (the reserve team of Plymouth Raiders) in 2009, the club rebranded as Plymouth Marjon and continue to field men's and women's teams in the English Basketball League.

The club was founded as Tamar Valley Cannons in 2000, named after the nearby River Tamar and its valley, dividing the counties of Devon and Cornwall. In 2007, the club changed its name to Plymouth Marjon Cannons after moving to the College of St Mark & St John (often abbreviated to Marjon) and becoming a part of its "Hub Club", operating a development system in partnership with the college.

== Home arenas ==
Mayflower Centre (2000-2007)
Marjon Campus (2007-2009)

== See also ==
- University of St Mark & St John (formerly the College of St Mark & St John)
- Plymouth Marjon
