= Trey Moore (basketball) =

American basketball player (born 1975)

Personal information
- Born: April 6, 1975 (age 51) Houston, Texas, U.S.
- Listed height: 6 ft 4 in (1.93 m)
- Listed weight: 176 lb (80 kg)

Career information
- College: Paris JC (1994–1996); Mississippi State (1996–1998)
- NBA draft: 1998: undrafted
- Playing career: 1998–2014
- Position: Shooting guard

Career history
- 2008–2009: Newcastle Eagles
- 2010–2011: Newcastle Eagles

Trey Moore (born April 6, 1975) is an American former professional basketball player. Moore is a 6 ft 4 in shooting guard, who played for Shreveport-Bossier Mavericks of the American Basketball Association.

== Early life ==
Moore was born in Houston, Texas. He attended Paris Junior College from 1994 to 1996, representing the Basketball team in the 1994–1995 and 1995–1996 seasons. He was coached by Scott Schumacher.

Moore then transferred to Mississippi State University in Starkville, Mississippi, where he played for the Bulldogs in the 1996–97 and 1997–98 seasons. In total, Moore played 59 times for Mississippi State, averaging 9.7 Points Per Game, 2.7 Rebounds Per Game and 3.3 Assists Per Game.

== Professional career ==
=== Black Hills Gold ===
1999–2000

Moore began his professional career in the 1999–2000 International Basketball Association for Black Hills Gold. Black Hills Gold finished runners up in the West Division and lost out in the IBA Division Semi Finals to Magic City Snowbears.

=== La Marque Mustangs ===
2002–2003

After taking some time out to play for the Harlem Globetrotters Moore signed for La Marque Mustangs for the 2002–2003 XBL season.

=== Birmingham Bullets ===
2003–2004

In the 2003–04 season Moore made his debut in the British Basketball League, for the Birmingham Bullets. His debut game came on December 7, 2003, against Milton Keynes Lions. The official British Basketball League website shows that Moore made 25 appearances for Birmingham Bullets and had a 24.28 Points Per Game Average, a 5.24 Rebounds Per Game Average and a 5.08 Assists Per Game Average.

=== Chester Jets ===
2004–2005

Before the start of the 2004–05 season Moore signed for British Basketball League side Chester Jets. The official British Basketball League website shows that Moore made 40 appearances for Chester Jets and had a 22.83 Points Per Game Average, a 4.3 Rebounds Per Game Average and a 5.25 Assists Per Game Average. This was a successful season and Moore picked up a British Basketball League Championship and a runner up medal in the British Basketball League Play-Offs. On a personal level Moore picked up the British Basketball League Most Valuable Player (MVP) award.

2007–2008

In the 2007–08 season Moore returned to the British Basketball League and to the Chester Jets. He made 13 appearances and had a 19.92 Points Per Game Average, a 5.62 Rebounds Per Game Average and a 3.85 Assists Per Game Average.

=== Newcastle Eagles ===
2008–2009

In the 2008–09 season Moore signed for the Newcastle Eagles and made 33 appearances with averages of 19.73 Points Per Game, 5.09 Rebounds Per Game and 4.55 Assists Per Game. In this season Moore picked up a British Basketball League Championship, a British Basketball League Play-Off Winner's medal and a BBL Trophy Winner's medal. On a personal level Moore picked up his second British Basketball League MVP award. He is only the third person to achieve two MVP awards in the British Basketball League.

=== Everton Tigers ===
2009–2010 In the 2009–10 season Moore signed for Everton Tigers and made 19 appearances with averages of 20 Points Per Game, 3.74 Rebounds Per Game and 4.55 Assists Per Game. Moore won the British Basketball League Play-Offs in this season.

=== Newcastle Eagles ===
2010–2011 On August 26, 2010, it was confirmed that Moore had re-signed for Newcastle Eagles. In the 2010–11 season after 9 appearances Moore had averaged 23.33 Points Per Game, 6.44 Rebounds Per Game and 6.22 Assists Per Game. Managing Director Paul Blake commented, "I would personally rate him as one of the best players to don an Eagles shirt".

== Honours and awards ==
- 2 BBL MVP Awards (2004/2005 and 2008/2009)
- 2-Time British Basketball League Championship Winner (2004/2005 and 2008/2009)
- 2-Time British Basketball League Play-Off Winner (2008/2009 and 2009/2010)
- 1-Time British Basketball League Play-Off Runner Up (2004/2005)
- 1-Time British Basketball Trophy Winner (2008/2009)

== Harlem Globetrotters ==
In 2001 Moore played for the Harlem Globetrotters.
