= Charles Smith (basketball, born October 1975) =

American-English basketball player

Personal information
- Born: October 23, 1975 (age 51) Philadelphia, Pennsylvania, U.S.
- Listed height: 6 ft 6 in (1.98 m)
- Listed weight: 180 lb (82 kg)

Career information
- High school: Chichester (Boothwyn, Pennsylvania)
- College: Rider (1993–1997)
- NBA draft: 1997: undrafted
- Playing career: 1997–2016
- Position: Forward
- Number: 10

Career history
- 1997–1998: York City Cyclones
- 1999–2000: Newcastle Eagles
- 2000–2001: WBC Wels
- 2001: Atlantic City Seagulls
- 2001–2002: Física
- 2002–2005: Newcastle Eagles
- 2005: Scottish Rocks
- 2005–2006: Efes Pilsen
- 2006: Newcastle Eagles
- 2006–2007: Clavijo
- 2007–2016: Newcastle Eagles

Career highlights
- BBL Most Valuable Player (2015); 3× BBL Team of the Year (2010, 2011, 2015); 6× BBL champion (2006, 2008–2010, 2012, 2014); 3× BBL Trophy MVP (2005, 2010, 2015); 5× BBL Trophy winner (2005, 2006, 2009, 2010, 2012); 4× BBL champion (2005, 2006, 2009, 2012); BBL Play-off Finals MVP (2012); BBL Cup winner (2012); BBL Cup MVP (2012); No. 10 retired by Newcastle Eagles; NEC Rookie of the Year (1994)

Career statistics
- Points: 7,048 (16.1 ppg)
- Steals: 649 (1.5 spg)
- Three-pointers: 767 (1.8 3pg)

Charles Smith (born October 23, 1975) is an American-born British former professional basketball player. A forward, he played 14 seasons with the Newcastle Eagles of the British Basketball League (BBL). Smith has been considered one of the greatest BBL players ever, representing both the Eagles and Scottish Rocks and most notably winning the BBL Most Valuable Player Award in 2015. Originally from Philadelphia, he competed for Rider at the college level. His professional career spanned across several countries, including Austria, Turkey, Portugal, and Spain, although a majority of his years were spent in Great Britain.

Smith's career achievements include winning the BBL Championship six times, the BBL Trophy five times, and the BBL Cup one time. He has been named MVP of each of the competitions on a total of six occasions. In addition, Smith has been a part of three different BBL Teams of the Year. He retired as the all-time leading scorer for the Newcastle Eagles and had his number retired by the team after the end of his career.

== High school career ==
Smith played basketball as a center for Chichester High School in Boothwyn, Pennsylvania. As a junior at the District 1 Class AAAA playoffs, he scored 35 points in a loss to Glen Mills. In the senior season in 1993, Smith became one of the top scorers in his county. On January 6, he led Chichester to its first win over Glen Mills in seven years with 29 points. On January 29, he paced his team with 34 points and 15 rebounds in a win over Harriton. On February 3, Chichester defeated Academy Park behind Smith's team-best 25 points. He helped stage a 10-point comeback late in the game, scoring 15 points in four minutes of the fourth quarter. Smith commented, "This was definitely the best stretch of basketball I ever had." In another notable performance on February 12, he scored a game-high 32 points against Chester. By the end of his final season, Smith was averaging 25.1 points, 11.0 rebounds and 4.0 blocks per game, and he was named Player of the Year in the Del-Val League.

== College career ==
Smith began playing college basketball for the Rider Broncs.

== Professional career ==
Shortly after college, Smith began playing at the professional level in Venezuela and Taiwan. He returned to Pennsylvania from 1997 to 1999, when he competed for the York City Cyclones of the Eastern Basketball Alliance (EBA). Smith played his first season in the British Basketball League (BBL) with the Newcastle Eagles in 1999–2000. He averaged 16.2 points and 6.2 rebounds per game.

In December 2000, Smith signed with the Austrian team WBC Wels.

Charles is the only Eagles player who actually pre-dates Fab Flournoy at the club. His first year was 2000-2001 under coach Craig Lynch and since then apart from one year in Spain and 3 games for the Scottish Rocks he has remained an Eagle.

Charles comes from a family background of basketball. Both his brothers play in Europe professionally. He starred for Rider University in New Jersey in his college days and since coming to England has demonstrated himself to be one of the smoothest and most complete scorers in BBL history. He has been MVP in no fewer than three separate final games. He now lives in the UK with his wife, Nicola, and three young daughters.

Since retiring from Professional Basketball, Charles has started working as head coach of the Tees Valley Mohawks.
