= Plymouth Marjon University =

University in Plymouth, England

Coordinates: 50°25′14″N 04°06′36″W

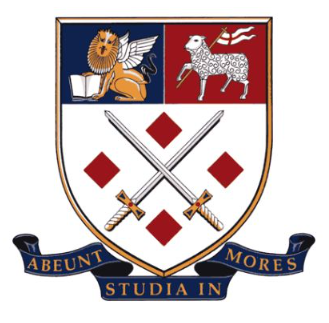
- Coat of Arms
- Other names: University of St Mark & St John
- Former names: University College Plymouth St Mark & St John (2007–2012); College of St Mark and St John (1923–2007)
- Motto: Latin: Abeunt studia in mores
- Motto in English: Out of studies comes character
- Type: Independent Church of England voluntary
- Established: University status (2012); Joint College (1923); St John's (1840); St Marks (1841)
- Affiliations: University of Exeter (1991-2013)
- Vice-Chancellor: Claire Taylor
- Students: 4,850 (2024/25)
- Undergraduates: 4,190 (2024/25)
- Postgraduates: 660 (2024/25)
- Location: Plymouth, England, UK
- Website: marjon.ac.uk

Plymouth Marjon University, commonly referred to as Marjon, is the trading name of the University of St Mark and St John, a university based primarily on a single campus on the northern edge of Plymouth, Devon, United Kingdom. Formerly named University College Plymouth St Mark & St John, the institution was awarded full university status in 2013.

The Vice-Chancellor of the university since 2023 is Professor Claire Taylor.

== History ==
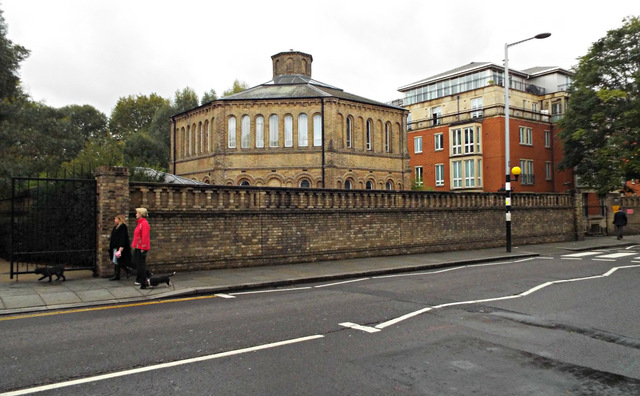
Original college building in Chelsea

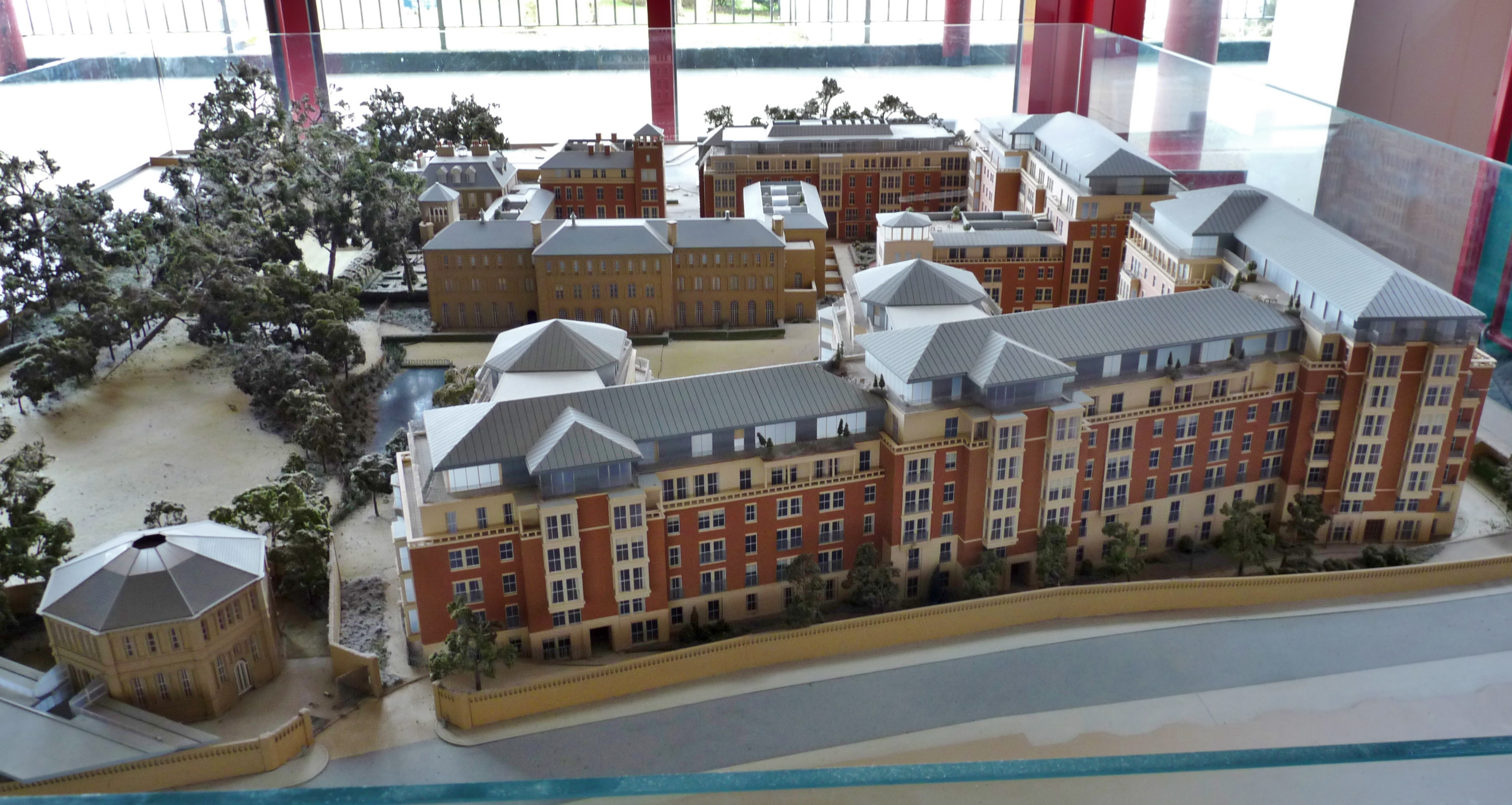
A model of the redevelopment of the Chelsea Campus as a housing complex

The university's history dates back to the foundation of its predecessor colleges in London, St John's College and St Mark's College. The former chapel of St Mark's College, designed by Edward Blore is on the Fulham Road, Chelsea, and is now a private residence.

St Mark's College in Chelsea was founded by the National Society (now National Society for Promoting Religious Education) in 1841. Its first principal, The Reverend Derwent Coleridge, son of the poet Samuel Taylor Coleridge, emphasised the study of Latin and worship in the college chapel. During the First World War, St Mark's College was requisitioned by the War Office to create the 2nd London General Hospital, a facility for the Royal Army Medical Corps to treat military casualties.

Battersea Training College was established in Old Battersea House in 1840 by Sir James Kay-Shuttleworth, together with Edward Carleton Tufnell, as a private teacher training institution. Kay-Shuttleworth transferred the college to the National Society in 1843. The college was renamed as St John's College, Battersea in around 1879.

These colleges merged in 1923, establishing a single institution in Chelsea as the College of St Mark & St John, with the title 'Marjon' first used, adopting the first part of both names. In 1973, the move to Plymouth came due to the college outgrowing the Chelsea campus.

In 1991 the college became affiliated to the University of Exeter, which accredited it to run undergraduate and postgraduate programmes leading to degree awards of the University of Exeter, and in 2007, gained University College status, as the University College Plymouth St Mark & St John. It was awarded full university status as Plymouth Marjon University in 2013.

== Campus ==
The university campus is located several miles north of Plymouth city centre, next to Derriford Hospital. Residential accommodation is provided, and all first-year students are guaranteed a place. In 2013 a major investment programme in campus facilities was completed, with new sport and exercise science laboratories, extensive indoor and outdoor sports provision, a theatre, a media centre and a music studio.

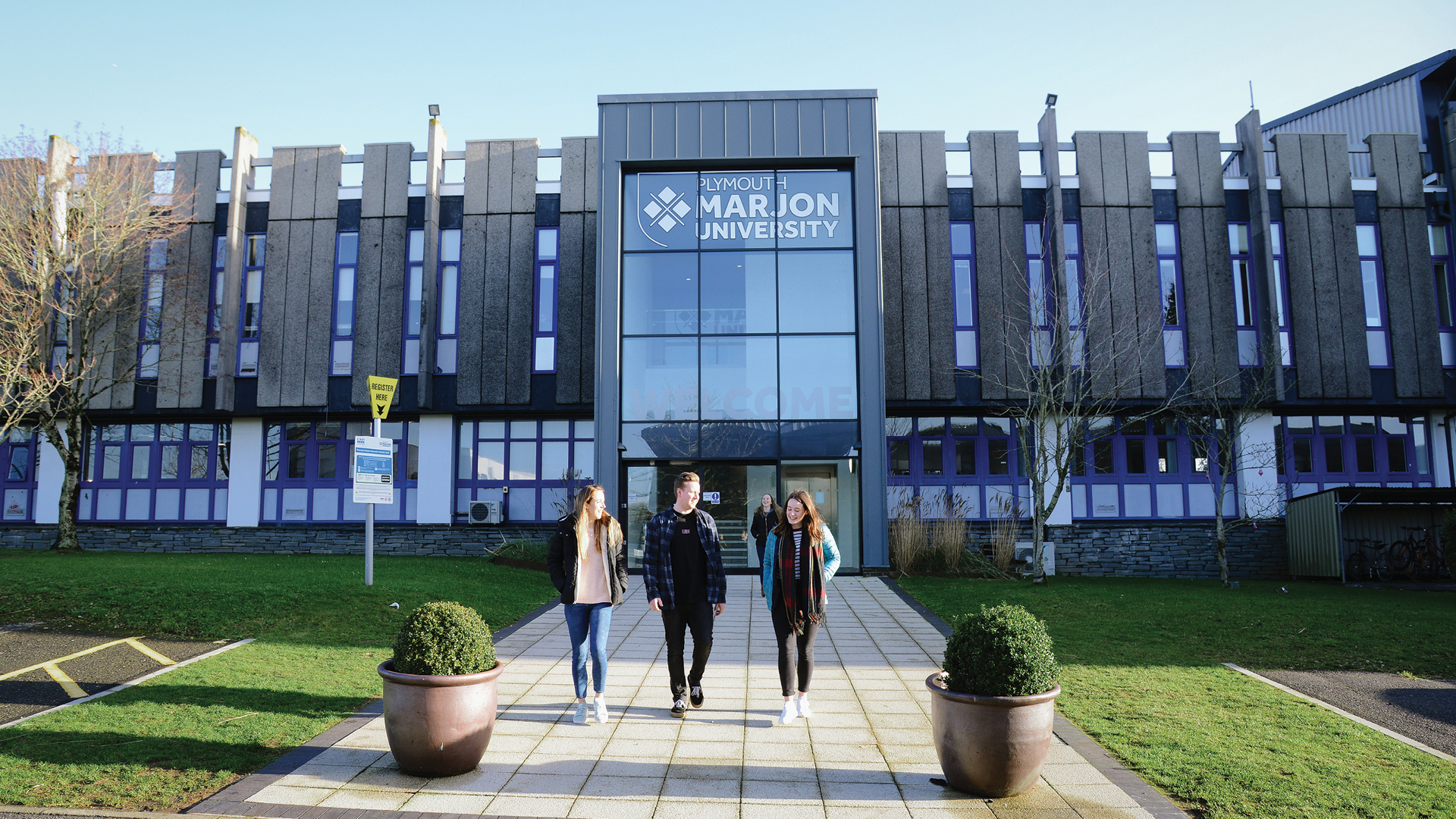
The main entrance to the campus in Derriford, Plymouth in April 2021

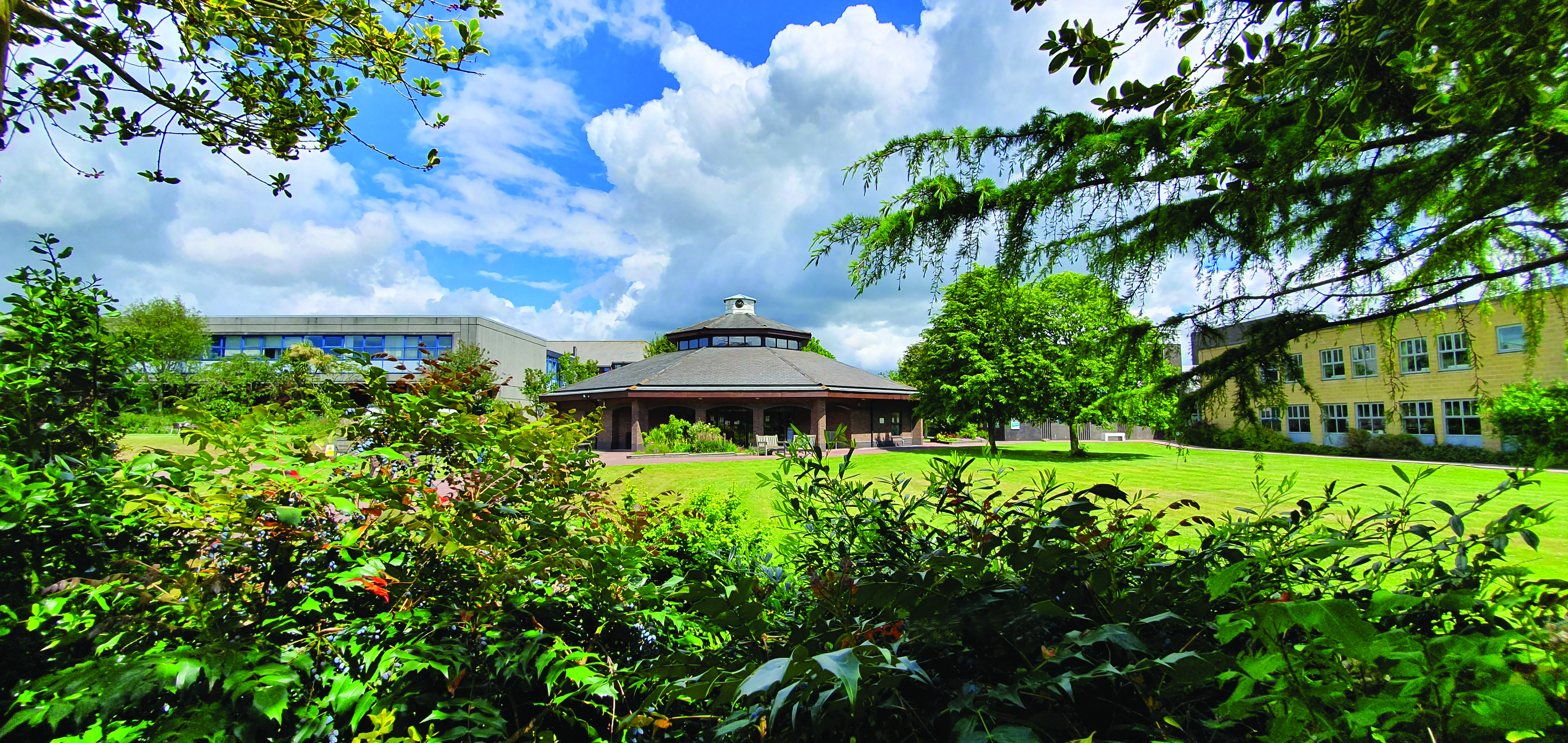
The chapel at Plymouth Marjon University as seen through trees.

== Academic profile ==
Rankings
National rankings
- Complete (2027): 115
- Times / Sunday Times (2027): 102

== Notable alumni ==
- Sharon Berry, founder of the Storybook Dads charity
- Bob Brunning, bass guitarist, founder member of Fleetwood Mac
- Joy Carroll, inspiration for The Vicar of Dibley
- Sir Lewis Casson, established the Actors' Association which became the British Actors' Equity Association.
- Tim Dakin, former Bishop of Winchester
- Helen Glover, London 2012 Olympic gold medal-winning rower and 2013 World Championship Gold Medal winner
- Harry Greenway, former Conservative MP for Ealing North
- Billy Hopkins, author of "Our Kid", and the sequel "High Hopes" chronicling his time as a trainee teacher in London
- Philip Kingsford, in 1912 held the best-ever triple jump record by an English-born athlete
- Gavin Love, basketball coach and former professional basketball player; all-time appearance leader for Plymouth Raiders
- Ernest Millington, Labour MP for Chelmsford 1945–50, and was the last surviving member of the House of Commons elected during the Second World War (he died in 2009).
- Ron Pickering, athletics coach and BBC sports commentator
- Paul Potts, English tenor. Winner of ITV's Britain's Got Talent 2007
- Henry Rawlingson Carr, Nigerian educationalist and administrator.
- Andrew Salkey, author, activist, poet, film and documentary maker
- Sir Frederick Wall, secretary of the Football Association, responsible for the purchase of the first Wembley Stadium
- Ian Whybrow, children's author.
- Anthony Willis, Paralympic games silver high jump and gold pentathlon winner.

== See also ==
- Armorial of UK universities
- College of Education
- List of universities in the UK
