= Terrence Durham =

American professional basketball player

Terrence Durham is an American professional basketball player.

Born in Albany, the 6'8" center was a graduate of St. Bonaventure University, which he attended from 1995 to 1999.

He signed his first professional contract in 2000 with Plymouth Raiders, then playing in the second-tier National Basketball League. After one season with the Raiders, Durham moved to Portugal to play with semi-pro teams Sampaense (2001–02) and GD Fabril (2002–03), both in the lower leagues. In 2003, he returned to Plymouth for his second spell at the club, and within one season saw the Raiders elected to the fully professional top-tier BBL. Durham then had a trial at Reims Champagne Basket in France, but returned to Plymouth in 2007. He left Plymouth after the 2009/10 season.
