= Marjon =

Marjon is a given name which may refer to:

- MarJon Beauchamp (born 2000), American basketball player
- Marjon Kamara (born 1949), Liberian diplomat and politician
- Marjon Lambriks (born 1949), Dutch soprano
- Marjon van Royen (born 1957), Dutch journalist
- Marjon Strijk, Dutch classical soprano
- Marjon Wijnsma (born 1965), Dutch retired heptathlete and long jumper
