= Olu Babalola =

British professional basketball player

Personal information
- Born: 10 September 1981 (age 45) London, England
- Listed height: 6 ft 6 in (1.98 m)
- Listed weight: 259 lb (117 kg)

Career information
- High school: St. Augustine Preparatory School; Richland, New Jersey
- College: Clemson (2001–2005)
- Playing career: 2005–2017
- Position: Forward

Career history
- 2005: Roseto Basket
- 2005–2006: Jämtland
- 2006–2008: Newcastle Eagles
- 2008–2010: Everton Tigers
- 2010: ETHA Engomis
- 2010–2015: Sheffield Sharks
- 2015: Manchester Giants
- 2015–2016: Cheshire Phoenix
- 2016: London Lions
- 2016–2017: Sheffield Sharks
- 2017: Leeds Force

Olu Babalola (born 10 September 1981) is a British professional basketball player who plays for the Leeds Force in the British Basketball League.

Born in London, England, Babalola played for St. Augustine Preparatory School in Richland, New Jersey, where he won a state championship in his sophomore season. He went on to team with Pops Mensah Bonsu during his senior season in high school.

The 6 ft 6 in power forward attended Clemson University before signing for Italian basketball team Roseto Basket in 2005 and soon after moving to Jämtland Basket in the Swedish Obol Basketball League. Early in 2006 Babalola returned to his homeland to sign for British Basketball League team Newcastle Eagles, making his debut against the Guildford Heat on 3 February 2006. Three months later Babalola won the "clean sweep" of trophies with the Eagles. He also represented the British University national team in 2005.

== National team ==
During his career, Babalola featured for both the England national team and Great Britain national team.
