= Garon Park =

Park in Southend-on-Sea, England

Coordinates: 51°33′22″N 0°44′08″E

Garon Park is a recreational park located within the city of Southend-on-Sea, Essex, England. The park is home to numerous sporting facilities including the Peter Butler Oval, a cricket ground used by Essex County Cricket Club, Southend Leisure & Tennis Centre and Garon Park Golf Complex. It is currently the home of Old Southendian Football Club, Old Southendian & Southchurch Cricket Club and Southend-on-Sea Athletic Club.

== Background ==
The ground was named after the Garon family of Southend who were major retailers in the town for several generations. Henry Garon had opened a chain of grocery & bakery shops, cinemas and banqueting suites at a time when rail travel to the town had started to bring in tourists from London. Norman Garon, was a member of the family who lived at Sutton Manor. He was unfortunately childless, and decided to set up a trust to manage the attached Foxhall Farm which had the famous Shopland Hall Herd of Friesian Cattle, which they had hoped would raise money to support young people in Southend, including the scouts. He recruited the assistance of Philip Tolhurst, whose father had set up trusts for other influential Southend families including the Jones family. In the 1982, the Norman Garon Trust was set up, with Tolhurst being joined as trustees by David Evans, a manager for a large farming company and Alan Jordan of Savills, who had both been involved in the Essex Scout movement.

However after Garon's death in 1990, the loss of several tenant farmers and changes in the agricultural business had seen the farm and managing the herd become financially unsustainable. The Trust had to look for solutions, as the farm could not be run at a loss under Charity laws. Tolhurst, who had already worked with a farmer near Witham to create a golf club, put forward the idea of a club on the land to generate income. At the same time Tolhurst, through one of his business partners, who was a councillor on Southend Borough Council, was informed of the councils issue of not having enough space at The Francis Sports Ground, which was adjacent to the farm, to build a new sports centre. After meeting with the leader of the council, a meeting was arranged at Essex County Cricket Club to discuss the situation. The meeting had been arranged at the County Ground, as the council had a further issue in that the Cricket Club wanted a new ground in Southend as Southchurch Park was becoming unsuitable. An agreement between the Trust and the council was made at the meeting to combine their land at the site to provide the new leisure centre, which had funding from the Lawn Tennis Association, a new first class cricket ground, a show ground and the golf course.

== The Peter Butler Oval ==
The Peter Butler Oval (Garon Park)
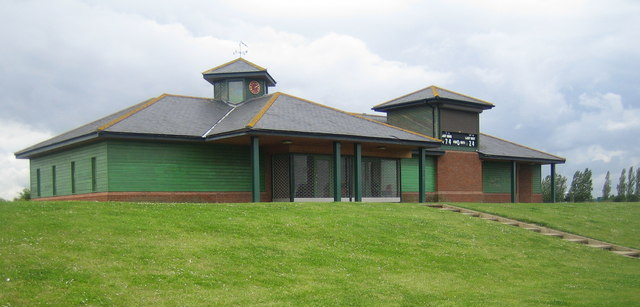
- Interactive map of The Peter Butler Oval (Garon Park)
- Location: Southend-on-Sea

Construction
- Opened: 2005

Tenant
- Essex County Cricket Club

=== Ground history ===
The pitch was laid by Anglia Sports Turf, with the square laid under the guidance of The Oval groundsman Harry Brind. Prior to the construction, a large fire pit was found in an archaeological dig of the site. The clubhouse was designed and built by the council, who would initially maintain the site, however they failed to maintain the pitch to the adequate standard, and a dedicated groundsman was recruited who was given accommodation in one of the Trusts cottages. In 2015, the Essex and Southend Sports Trust (EASST) was created by members of the cricket club, led by Peter Butler, who agreed to take over the management of the Cricket ground and create a Centre of Cricketing Excellence. In 2009, EASST built a new digital scoreboard for the ground. In 2022 was renamed the Peter Butler Oval, in remembrance to the former Essex County Cricket Club board member and EASST member, who had died in November 2021.

=== Essex County Cricket Club at Garon Park ===
The cricket ground was first used by the Essex County Cricket Club, 1st XI in 2005. The ground hosted two games in 2008, against Glamorgan in the County Championship and Northamptonshire in the Pro40 League.

The ground has hosted 3 first-class matches and 4 List A matches. The final match played by the first team was the Division Two County Championship match with Leicestershire in 2011. The ground has since been used as an outground and home to the club’s Second XI, Women’s and Ability teams.

=== Game information ===
Game Type	No. of Games
County Championship Matches	4
Limited-over county matches	3
Twenty20 matches	0

=== Game statistics – first-class ===
Category	Information
Highest Team Score	Essex (399 against Somerset) in 2006
Lowest Team Score	Essex (88 against Gloucestershire) in 2007
Best Batting Performance	Andy Flower (132 Runs for Essex against Durham) in 2005
Best Bowling Performance	Steve Kirby (5/41 for Gloucestershire against Essex) in 2007 and Jonathan Lewis (5/41 for Gloucestershire against Essex) in 2007

=== Game statistics – one-day matches ===
Category	Information
Highest Team Score	Essex (202/8 in 45 overs against Middlesex) in 2005
Lowest Team Score	Middlesex (144 in 36.4 overs against Essex) in 2006
Best Batting Performance	Paul Weekes (82 Runs for Middlesex against Essex) in 2005
Best Bowling Performance	Heath Streak (4/39 for Warwickshire against Essex) in 2007

== Southend Leisure & Tennis Centre ==
Southend Leisure & Tennis Centre
- Garon Park
- Interactive map of Southend Leisure & Tennis Centre
- Former names: The Francis Sports Ground
- Location: Southend-on-Sea, England
- Owner: Southend-on-Sea Borough Council
- Operator: Fusion Lifestyle

Construction
- Opened: March 1996

Southend Swimming & Diving Centre
- Garon Park
- Interactive map of Southend Swimming & Diving Centre
- Location: Southend-on-Sea, England
- Owner: Southend-on-Sea Borough Council
- Operator: Fusion Lifestyle

Construction
- Opened: 15 November 2010

Southend Swimming & Diving Centre at Southend Leisure & Tennis Centre.

Southend Leisure & Tennis Centre is a sports centre located in Southend-on-Sea, Essex, England. The centre was built in March 1996 and expanded in November 2010, adding Southend Swimming and Diving Centre to the site, with a new reception area linking the two centres together with self-swiping turnstiles. The site's main name remained as Southend Leisure & Tennis Centre with the addition of Southend Swimming and Diving Centre. The centre is also known as Garon Park, as the buildings sit within the park site. The centre is run by Fusion Lifestyle.

=== Facilities ===
The Leisure Centre offers the following facilities:

- Expressions Gym
- Group Fitness Studio
- Sauna, Steam Room & Spa
- 4 Indoor Tennis Courts
- 8 Court Sports Hall
  - 2 Court Secondary Hall
- 3 Basketball Courts British Basketball League Standard
- Fully Flood-Lit:
  - 8 lane Olympic size Athletics Track
  - 4 Outdoor Tennis Courts
  - 4 Outdoor Netball Courts
- Cappuccino Bar & Cafe
- Small Steps Day Nursery
- Function Rooms & Suites
- Spectator seating & Disabled access for:
  - 25m Swimming Pool
  - Fun Pool & Slide
  - Olympic Diving Facility

=== Regular hosts ===
Each year, Southend Leisure & Tennis Centre hosts regular users and events:

- The Olympic size Athletics Track has been the host for Southend-on-Sea Athletic Club since 1994. The track itself was refurbished in 2011.
- The 8 Court Main Hall hosts events such as wrestling and cage fighting events in the Ultimate Warrior Challenge.
- The centre was home to the British Basketball League team the Essex Pirates.

=== Olympic training ground ===
After resurfacing & refurbishment of the athletics track in 2011, the site was proposed to be used as an Olympic Training Ground for the London 2012 Summer Olympics in the following sports:

- Athletics
- Basketball
- Diving

== Controversy ==
In 2024, local campaigners claimed that the Garon Park Community Interest Company were committing "uncontrolled development" at the park, with the flattening of wild spaces for extra 3G football pitches. The company however stated that work would not start until planning permission was received, and that the extra facilities were to meet the needs of grassroots teams, colleges and charities. Southend-on-Sea City Council stated that they had "an open ongoing planning enforcement investigation into the concerns raised".

In June 2025, Southend-on-Sea City Council gave permission to revised plans, including redeveloping unused grass netball courts and dropping plans to close access to a pathway used by local residents. The plans included a new 3g pitch, cafe and storage area.
