= Gavin Love =

British basketball player (born 1978)

Personal information
- Born: 2 June 1978 (age 48) Plymouth, England
- Listed height: 6 ft 0 in (1.83 m)

Career information
- College: Plymouth Marjon University
- Playing career: 1996–2009
- Position: Point guard
- Number: 6
- Coaching career: 2010–present

Career history

Playing
- 1996–2009: Plymouth Raiders

Coaching
- 2010–2013: Plymouth Raiders
- 2014–2015: Copenhagen Wolfpack
- 2016–2017: AB Contern
- 2017–2018: Plymouth Raiders
- 2018–2022: AB Contern
- 2022–present: Etzella

Career highlights
- As player: 2x NBL Division 1 winner (2001, 2004); English National Cup winner (2004); BBL Trophy winner (2007); As coach: 3x BBL Coach of the Month (December 2010, December 2011, March 2012); Luxembourg national champion (2025)

Gavin Love (born 2 June 1978 in Plymouth, England) is a former British professional basketball player and current head coach of Etzella of the Luxembourg Basketball League.

== Playing career ==
Love was educated at Plymouth Marjon University (then called College of St. Mark & St. John) and played for his hometown team Plymouth Raiders from 1996, and the first team since 2000 until his retirement in 2009. As a point guard, Love played 371 times for Raiders during his career, making him the club's all-time leading appearance maker.

Love featured as part of a dominant Raiders team in the early 2000s, winning the NBL Division 1 in 2001 and 2004, as well as the English National Cup in 2004 and the BBL Trophy in 2007.

In 2007, Love earned a call-up to the Great Britain national team coached by Chris Finch, only to pull out after badly damaging his Achilles tendon in the final game of the league campaign, and had to undergo an operation and lengthy rehabilitation period. Love made a recovery and returned in 2008 but was constantly hampered by further injuries, which eventually prompted an early retirement, announced on 6 February 2009, at the age of 29. His number six jersey was subsequently retired by Raiders in honour of his service to the club.

== Coaching career ==
On 8 June 2010, Love was appointed as head coach of the Plymouth Raiders, replacing his former coach and mentor Gary Stronach who had left the club after 24 years of service.

Love was named as BBL Coach of the Month for December 2010, whilst during the 2011–12 season, Love received a further two BBL Coach of the Month awards, for December and March. In the same season, Love led Raiders to both the BBL Cup Final and BBL Trophy Final, losing on both occasions however, to Newcastle Eagles.

On 7 September 2013 Love was dismissed as head coach of the Raiders two weeks before the start of the 2013–14 season and replaced by fellow former teammate Jay Marriott.

After a short stint as an agent, Love was appointed as head coach of Copenhagen Wolfpack of the Danish Basketligaen in 2014. For the 2014–15 season, Wolfpack finished in 4th position and qualified for the post-season Playoffs whilst Love was named as runner-up in the Basketligaen Coach of the Year awards.

Following his tenure in Denmark, Love moved to Luxembourg in 2016 and was appointed as the head coach of AB Contern in the Luxembourg Basketball League. However, after one year, on 20 July 2017, Love announced his return to Plymouth and to the Raiders head coach position for a second time. The reunion was short-lived as, after a 10th-place finish in the British Basketball League standings, Love resigned following the close of the 2017–18 season and returned to Luxembourg for a second spell at Contern where he continued for another four seasons until 2022.

On 31 May 2022, Love was announced as the new head coach for Etzella. In the 2024–25 season, he led the Etzella team to the Luxembourg national championship.
