= Plymouth Raiders =

English national league basketball team

- League: NBL Division 3
- Established: 1983; 43 years ago (established); 2023; 3 years ago (reformed)
- History: Plymouth Raiders (1983–2021, 2023–present)
- Arena: Plymouth Life Centre
- Capacity: 400
- Location: Plymouth, Devon
- Team colours: Green, White, Orange, Black
- Head coach: Gareth Laws
- Ownership: Ross Mackenzie
- Website: plymouthraiders.com
Home	Away

Plymouth Raiders are a basketball team based in Plymouth, England, currently competing in Division 3 of the National Basketball League.

Founded in 1983 through a merger between two local basketball clubs, Raiders were a formidable force within the National Basketball League throughout the 1990s and early 2000s, winning no less than six national trophies between 1996 and 2004 including three National Basketball League Play-off titles, two Division 1 league titles and the National Cup in 2004.

After years of dominating the second-tier National Basketball League (later rebranded to English Basketball League in 2003), the Raiders moved to the franchise-based professional British Basketball League (BBL) in 2004, playing amongst the United Kingdom's elite teams. Their only silverware in the top-tier came in 2007, winning the BBL Trophy, though the team would reach three further BBL Trophy finals and two BBL Cup finals between 2009 and 2021, without further success.

The Raiders announced their withdrawal from the British Basketball League following the 2020–21 season, attributing to increasing rental costs of their long-time home venue, the Plymouth Pavilions. However, after a two year hiatus, Raiders announced their relaunch in 2023, entering Division 3 of the National Basketball League..

== History ==
=== Origins and foundation ===
The origins of the Raiders organisation can be traced back to two local amateur basketball teams, Plymouth Kanaries and Plympton Basketball Club, both of which were founded in the late 1960s. Formed in 1968, Plympton had established themselves as a formidable force in the region, winning the local Plymouth & District League and Cup on 7 occasions, and entered the regional Southern League in 1976.

Kanaries, also a dominant team in the Southern League, became the first team to represent the city of Plymouth in the national leagues when they entered the National Basketball League in the 1979–80 season. Known as Plymouth Panasonic, due to sponsorship reasons, and coached by future Raiders co-founder Frank Pocock, the team achieved a 7th-place finish in Division Two before withdrawing after just one season due to a lack of finances. Kanaries continued to have success in the Southern League and went on to win the Founders' Cup – a nationwide competition for non-national league teams – in 1983 after defeating local rivals Plympton in the Semi-finals and Stockport Belgrade in the Final; earning a 76–64 home win in the first leg at the Mayflower Centre, Plymouth sealed the title with a comfortable 90–76 away win in the second leg on 26 March 1983, to win 166–140 on aggregate.

Having previously attempted to re-join the national leagues, the Kanaries – led by Pocock and Bob Karruck – joined forces with Plympton's Dave Mills and local basketball figures including Martyn Moon, Keith Mollard and businessman Les Palmer (of the Wrigley's company) to form a consortium in 1983 and merged the two teams together. The new club was accepted into Division Two of the National Basketball League for the 1983–84 season. A sponsorship deal was arranged with pharmaceutical producer Farley Health, and the team adopted their brand colours of red and yellow and the sponsor name Glucodin, after one of their leading products. Several nicknames were considered for the newly established team including Plymouth Cavaliers and Plymouth Armada, however after being inspired by a photo of a fox in a magazine and imagining a fox raiding for chickens, the name Plymouth Raiders was settled on by the ownership.

=== Early years (1983–1996) ===
Raiders played their first competitive game on 24 September 1983, a 97–84 away loss to Calderdale Explorers, and continued with a further away defeat to Newcastle, 108–88, on the following day. Plymouth's first home game took place on 1 October, at the Mayflower Centre, with a further 75–76 defeat to the visiting Merseyside Mustangs. American Dave Lutz, formerly of East Stroudsburg University, made an immediate impact scoring 116 points in the first three games.

After an inconsistent start to the campaign, Canadian coach Graham Nicholls stepped down from his position and was replaced by his assistant Bob Karruck who led the team to lowly 10th-placed finished in their rookie season.

Gary Stronach became player/coach in 1994.

The club endured a barren spell throughout the early 1990s and were forced to leave their Mayflower Centre in 1991 due to a leak in the roof. The team underwent a brief nomadic period using venues such as the John Kitto Centre, China Fleet Centre, Ivybridge Community College and even Torbay Leisure Centre, 30 miles away in Paignton, to host home games. The Raiders returned to the Mayflower Centre, now with a brand new roof, in January 1992 and made a brief return to the Play-offs before bowing out to League Runners-up Bury Lobos in the semi-final. By late 1992, with no major sponsor in place, the Raiders faced more financial troubles and an uncertain future. Following the help of a local newspaper campaign in the Evening Herald, Wolferstan's Solicitors came forward with a sponsorship offer and investment that enabled the club to survive its second financial crisis in six years.

In the summer of 1993, head coach Bob Karruck announced his retirement and was replaced by his assistant Vic Fleming, who led the team to the 1994 National Trophy Final. Raiders were pitted against Sheffield Forgers at their home Sheffield Arena and, despite a spirited performance, they lost by 60–62 to a Sheffield team who would be crowned as Carlsberg League champions the following year. Fleming's tenure lasted only a season as he left to join the Chester Jets and was replaced by long-serving player Gary Stronach, who assumed the role of player/coach.

=== Golden era (1996–2004) ===
Plymouth Raiders Logo (used until 2012)

In 1998 the Raiders lost the league, trophy and NBL Final to Richmond Jaguars.

The 1998–99 season saw the Raiders and Solent Stars finishing the regular season on equal 21–5 records, the title was ultimately decided by a two-point aggregate differential in the head-to-head between the two teams. Raiders rallied a superb Play-off run and following the defeats of Cardiff Clippers, 111–101, and Guilford Pumas, 93–75, they edged out familiar foes Teesside in the Final at Guildford Spectrum, 71–66, securing the Play-off crown for the second time.

The 2000–2001 season saw Stronach recruit arguably the strongest roster the franchise had ever seen, bringing in Todd Cetnar and Terrence Durham, two American imports straight out of Albany and St. Bonaventure University's respectively. The addition of local players Roderick Wellington, Deng Deng (brother of Luol Deng), Canadian Peter Knechtel and Welsh international Nathan Hayes, bolstered an impressive roster and with eight straight victories to open the season, the Raiders were on course to claim the newly rebranded NBL Conference title. The first defeat of the campaign came in the Trophy Semi-final to a Worthing Thunder team that inflicted two further defeats upon Plymouth throughout the season and matched the Raiders all the way in the hunt for silverware. However, it was Raiders who came out on top with a 19–2 record and the Conference crown for the first time in the franchise's history. The season was completed with an excellent run in the Play-offs sweeping aside Sutton (98–68) and Manchester Magic (162–155 over two games), before commanding an 83–77 defeat on Worthing at Wembley Arena and claiming the Championship double.

After two seasons in Portugal, Terrence Durham's return was the only adjustment in a largely unchanged roster for the 2003–2004 season which saw the club accept an invitation to appear in the BBL Trophy for a second time, adding to a tough schedule including the league (now reverted to EBL Division 1), the National Trophy and the National Cup, which for the first time in history didn't feature any BBL teams. Progress through the National Cup provided interest early in the season, and the Final was reached with Teesside Mohawks providing the opposition at the EIS Sheffield, however it was Raiders who walked away with the George Williams Trophy after a close 89–82 victory. The National Trophy was once more unattainable following a surprise defeat to Sutton in the semi-final, but Raiders domination in the league secured another trophy, finishing first with just two defeats to London United and Reading, who finished in second place. The Play-off Final was reached again, but Raiders were unable to add a third title to the season's haul as Teesside, exacting their National Cup defeat revenge, came out on top with an 80–75 win.

=== Move to the British Basketball League (2004–2016) ===
Having firmly established themselves as the dominant force in Division 1, winning six trophies in the past eight seasons, the club announced in the summer of 2004 that they had been admitted into the top-tier British Basketball League (BBL), the United Kingdom's highest level basketball competition. Canadian Ryan French, along with Gerrick Morris and Jeff Danchie, were brought in as new signings to strengthen the roster who had won the Division 1 title in the previous season. Raiders played their first BBL game on 2 October 2004, winning 63–46 against visitors Milton Keynes Lions at the Plymouth Pavilions.

During the 2006–07 season they won eight games in a row and by December found themselves joint top of the BBL. In the BBL Trophy final, at Newcastle's MetroRadio Arena on 4 March 2007, Raiders defeated Newcastle Eagles 74–65 to win their first top-flight title.

In the league, Raiders constantly held a Play-off position for the majority of the season and though qualifying with ease, just missed out on home advantage with a 5th-place finish. A journey into uncharted territory awaited the Plymouth team appearing in their first BBL Play-offs, however it was also a long journey to face opponents Scottish Rocks, as the league's most Southern and Northern teams met in the one-off clash. A dream first appearance to the Finals Weekend for Raiders was dashed by a 6-point defeat, 83–77, but a huge worry was an in-game injury to captain Gavin Love's Achilles tendon, which subsequently forced the Point Guard to miss a call-up to the Great Britain national team. At the end of season awards, Raiders "big-man" Aaron was named in the All-Star first team and 4th in the MVP ballot, finishing the season on 17 points-per-game, 12.4 rebounds-per-game and a field goal scoring average of 59%. On 1 May, the Raiders development programme was awarded with the prestigious Club Mark accolade by Sport England and England Basketball.

With such an excellent season under his belt, star man Carlton Aaron departed from the team during the close-season, trying out for teams in South Korea, before eventually signing for a Guildford side preparing for their first appearance in Europe's ULEB Cup.

After committing over two decades of service to the Raiders, Coach Stronach was presented by the BBC with a Lifetime Achievement Award at a ceremony in November, honouring the success he has brought to Plymouth. In March they travelled to leaders Newcastle, having won their previous seven league games. They faced Newcastle in the 3rd place game on 4 May 2008, and though losing 54–33 at half-time, edged out their opponents in a tight 96–92 victory taking 3rd place, the best league position in the club's history. With an average of 19 points-per-game, Plymouth's top scorer Andrew Lasker was named in the All-Star team for the 2007–08 season . After being declined by Newcastle and Guildford – who both finished above Plymouth in the league – FIBA approached Raiders with an invitation to compete in the EuroChallenge for the 2008–09 season, which Raiders also duly declined.

After six years of sponsorship from Kularoos, the Raiders board announced during the summer of 2008 a major new deal had been reached with Plymouth-based chewing gum giant Wrigley's Airwaves, reportedly "one of the biggest in basketball history". The extra funds brought in allowed for a bigger budget in terms of recruiting, and within days the signing of Kwbana Beckles was publicised. Beckles came with plenty of pedigree having appeared in Sweden, Switzerland, Israel and spells for NBA teams Atlanta Hawks and Toronto Raptors. Veteran player DeAntoine Beasley took up the new dual role as player/assistant coach, declining a coaching job in the USA while captain Gavin Love, who missed much of the previous season through injury signed a new one-year contract.

In October, the team was boosted with the visit of a FIBA inspection team that approved the use of the Pavilions for European competition matches, providing a top-two finish is achieved in the Championship. In the BBL Cup the Raiders won a two-game Semi-final series against Guildford to reach only their second BBL Final. Their final opponents were Everton Tigers who recorded a 103–49 victory over Plymouth at the NIA in Birmingham. At the end of January Coach Stronach announced the signing of Gerald Robinson, an American with a Dutch passport, from Spanish team Oviedo. A week later, Gavin Love announced he was to retire from playing after 13 years with the Raiders, citing multiple injuries as the reason. In honour of his services to the club, his number six jersey was to be retired at a ceremony on 14 February 2009 prior to a game with Guildford. Israeli Point Guard Haggai Hundert was drafted in from Slovenia to fill the void left by Love. The franchise expanded on its ambitions to play in Europe with the announcement on 16 March, of a co-operation deal with Spanish giants Unicaja Málaga; the alliance will see Raiders coaches going to Spain to gain experience and young players coming to Plymouth to improve their English and education. A 96–73 defeat at the hands of Sheffield Sharks saw injuries to Andrew Lasker, Anthony Martin and Terrence Durham. In April 2009 it was announced that Andrew Lasker had made the team of the season.

In summer 2009 Stronach revealed that the player's budget had been cut by 60–65% for the coming season, citing the economic climate and a lack of sponsorship as the main reasons for the cuts. In June 2009 Allister Gall was named the new captain. In July 2009 James Noel extended his contract. The summer saw the unveiling of a restructured development programme following a merger of Raiders development team with local club Plymouth Marjon Cannons, headed by former Cannons coach George Hatchell.

Eric Flato, a recent graduate of Yale University, was signed in July 2009, and the news was soon followed by the capture of Terry Horton, another American, who was brought in from Germany. In October 2009 Anthony Martin was re-signed following a brief spell at Worcester, having departed the Raiders just months earlier. Former Raiders development talent Anthony Rowe signed on a one-month deal in November. Flato picked up a serious injury in November and subsequently left the club. His replacement was Drew Lasker, the team's top-scorer for the past four seasons, who left during the summer, but who had been without a club. He marked his return in a 69–84 loss to Everton on 5 December.

In February it was announced that James Noel was released from his contract, due to a series of long-term injuries, allowing the team's bench players more opportunity. Form started to improve throughout the Spring, but a double loss to Glasgow and Worthing at the beginning of April ended any hopes of qualifying for the Play-offs with fives games left of the regular season. Two weeks later it was announced by the club that after 24 years of service Gary Stronach was to step down as head coach at the end of the season. Coming as a shock to many fans, Stronach cited the reason for his departure was that "it's time for me to move on, broaden the horizon and see what's out there."

The club started preparations for the new season immediately and ushered in the new era post-Stronach with the appointment of former player and team captain Gavin Love as the new head coach of the Raiders' first team, stepping up from his previous position of Stronach's assistant coach. Love's first signing as head coach came in the form of dual-national American Guard Cody Toppert from Germany. His wife Brittany, a professional football player and United States international, followed him to Plymouth and signed for local team Plymouth Argyle Ladies. Love continued to build the new-look Raiders roster with the signings of England international Taner Adu from Essex Pirates and American import players Otis Polk and Brian McKenzie, straight out of college. British youngsters Matt Guymon and Sam Cricelli were also drafted in soon after however England international Guymon left within weeks of the season opener for personal reasons. With the announced returns of Marriott, Czynienik and Anthony Rowe from the previous season the roster was starting to take shape, but Love was dealt a further blow when fan-favourite Allister Gall announced he would not be renewing his contract for the upcoming campaign.

=== Ownership changes, demise and the future (2017–2022) ===
On 17 July 2017 the ownership of Plymouth Raiders was taken over from Bob Widdecombe to Ross Mackenzie and Richard Mollard. The new owners moved quickly to appoint Louis Sayers as their first player for the 2017–18 season. Following on from this, the owners introduced a brand new logo to form part of a re-branding of the club.

Due to its position as the 2nd oldest club in UK basketball history, the Plymouth Raiders maintained their home venue of 20 years at the Plymouth Pavilions, operating and competing successfully throughout this period from 2017 to 2020, establishing the club once again as a force within UK basketball with some of the BBL's most exciting players representing the club - Donte Nicholas, Rashad Hassan, Josh Wilcher, Joonas Jarvelianen and led by club captain Zak Wells. Raiders also fostered new talent by recruiting Denzel Ubiaro in 2017 who remained with the club for 4 years as he pursued his studies via Marjon.

The community pathway projects accelerated during this period including the CVL/Youth Development League which were formed providing basketball learning opportunities to hundreds of school age young people across the city. Foxy's Little Ballers brought basketball to juniors in an ever expanding programme catering for all groups and early years learners. Commercially the club had achieved the largest following from within the business community in its 35-year history.

During this period, plans were put in motion to identify solutions for the club's long-term future that would be secured via the model of venue ownership as per Leicester and Newcastle's respective arenas. Club Director/Co Owner Richard Mollard had presented detailed plans to Plymouth City Council and led a consortium of partners to explore the potential for a new venue. These plans continue to provide the blue print for a future venue.

During the 2018/19 season, the Marjon University programme expanded expontentially under the Plymouth Raiders management and Assistant Coach Danny McGee oversaw the recruitment of 25 aspiring elite athletes joining the Raiders Elite University programme.

In February 2020 MLA College, under educational business BAU Global, purchased a 60% ownership share of the club. Enver Yucel visited Plymouth on 16 February to present his vision.

MLA College were keen to continue the club's rich history, to bring silverware to the city, and strive to see the Raiders one day competing in European competition.

The following season under the new Raiders owner - 2020/21 - the BBL instructed all teams to play behind closed doors during the Covid pandemic and the BBL were the only indoor sport that operated during this unprecedented season. The Raiders finished in their highest BBL finish in 3rd position with a win/loss record - W21 L9, finishing behind London Lions in 2nd and Champions Leicester Riders. Raiders players during this season included Team GB star Ashley Hamilton, fellow Brits Will Neighbour, Denzel Ubiaro and Andrew Lawrence (injured), Elvisi Dusha with US imports Rickey McGill, Chris Porter Bunton Mike Morsell and Prince Ibeh.

In March 2021, the Plymouth Raiders reached the BBL Trophy Final, losing 88/82 to London Lions.

On 8 July 2021, it was announced that Plymouth Raiders would withdraw from the British Basketball League for the 2021/22 season.

The naming and branding rights of the Plymouth Raiders were bought back by previous co-owner Ross Mackenzie in an open auction.

== Logos ==
1996–2012

2012–2017

2017–2021,
2023–present

== Home venues ==
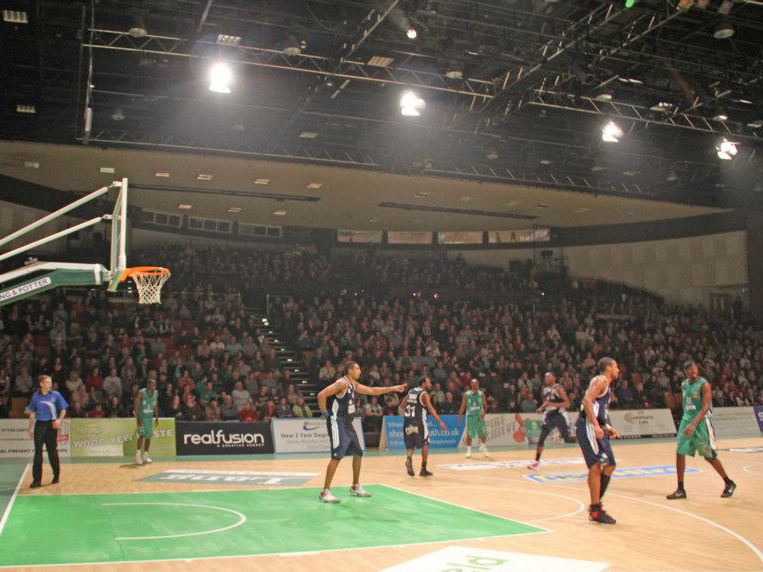
Plymouth Pavilions

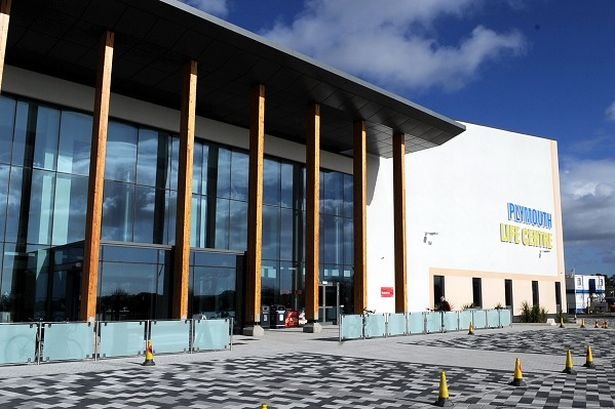
Plymouth Life Centre

Derriford Sports Hall (1983)
Mayflower Centre (1983–1996)
Plymouth Pavilions (1996–2021)
Plymouth Life Centre (2023–present)

Plymouth Raiders have played their home games at the Plymouth Pavilions arena since 1996. In basketball configuration the main arena has a capacity for 1,500 spectators, with tiered seating on either side of the court and floor-level seating behind each basket.

Before moving to the Pavilions, Raiders were based at the Mayflower Centre, a 1,000-capacity sports facility adjacent to the Home Park football stadium in Central Park. The Raiders played out of the Mayflower Centre from 1983 until their move to the Pavilions in 1996, however, due to on-going issues with the venue's roof, the team spent much of the 1991–1992 season playing their home matches at the China Fleet Club, Ivybridge Community College, the John Kitto Centre and Torbay Leisure Centre in Paignton.

Though the Pavilions arena has been approved by international governing body FIBA for hosting European competition matches, former Raiders' chairman Bob Widdecombe has stated the club's ambition is to move to a new purpose-built arena that would be solely owned by the organisation and would be more suited to hosting European competition.

In 2021 the Raiders were forced to withdraw from the 2021/22 season due to an increase in the rent for use of Plymouth Pavilions. Plymouth City Council continues to work with Plymouth Raiders to find a solution, with longer-term plans to build a multi-sport arena which has the capacity to deliver a venue for spectator events and act as a home for Plymouth Raiders.

== Trophies ==
=== League ===
- NBL Conference Winners: 2000/01
- EBL Division One Winners: 2003/04
- NBL Division One Runners Up: 1996/97, 1997/98 & 1998/99
- NBL Conference Runners Up: 2001/02, & 2002/03

=== Playoffs ===
- NBL Division One Play Off Winners: 1996/97, & 1998/99
- NBL Conference Play Off Winners: 2000/01
- EBL Division One Play Off Runners Up: 2003/04

=== Trophy ===
- National Trophy Runners Up: 1985/86, 1993/94, 1996/97, 1997/98 & 1998/99
- BBL Trophy Winners: 2006/07
- BBL Trophy Runners Up: 2011/12/21

=== Cup ===
- National Cup Winners: 2003/04
- BBL Cup Winners' Cup Runners Up: 2007/08
- BBL Cup Runners Up: 2011/2012

== Season-by-season records ==
Seasons 1983–2004
Season	Division	Tier	Regular Season						Post-Season	Trophy	Cup	Head coach
Season	Division	Tier	Finish	Played	Wins	Losses	Points	Win %	Post-Season	Trophy	Cup	Head coach
Plymouth Raiders
1987–88	NBL	2	4th	18	12	6	24	0.667	Semifinals	(NT)	Second Round (NC)	Bob Karruck
1988–89	D1	2	6th	20	10	10	20	0.500		(NT)	(NC)	Bob Karruck
1989–90	D1	2	9th	22	8	14	16	0.364	Did not qualify	(NT)	(NC)	Bob Karruck
1990–91	D2	2	12th	22	4	18	8	0.182	Did not qualify	(NT)	(NC)	Bob Karruck
1991–92	D2	2	6th	22	13	9	26	0.591		(NT)	(NC)	Bob Karruck
1992–93	D2	2	9th	22	9	13	18	0.409	Did not qualify	(NT)	Third Round (NC)	Bob Karruck
1993–94	NBL 1	2	10th	18	3	15	14	0.200	Did not qualify	Finalists (NT)	Third Round (NC)	Vic Fleming
1994–95	NBL 1	2	9th	22	7	15	14	0.318	Did not qualify		Third Round (NC)	Gary Stronach
1995–96	NBL 1	2	10th	22	7	15	14	0.318	Did not qualify		Second Round (NC)	Gary Stronach
1996–97	NBL 1	2	2nd	26	20	6	40	0.769	Winners	Finalists (NT)	Did not enter	Gary Stronach
1997–98	NBL 1	2	2nd	22	19	3	38	0.864	Finalists	Finalists (NT)	First Round (NC)	Gary Stronach
1998–99	NBL 1	2	2nd	26	21	5	42	0.808	Winners	Finalists (NT)	First Round (NC)	Gary Stronach
1999–00	NBL 1	2	4th	24	16	8	32	0.667	Quarterfinals	Third Round (NT); Group Stage (BT)	First Round (NC)	Gary Stronach
2000–01	EBL C	2	1st	21	19	2	38	0.905	Winners	Quarterfinals (NT)	Did not enter	Gary Stronach
2001–02	EBL C	2	2nd	18	14	4	28	0.778	Semifinals	Semifinals (NT)	First Round (NC)	Gary Stronach
2002–03	EBL C	2	2nd	22	18	4	36	0.818	Semifinals	Semifinals (NT)	First Round (NC)	Gary Stronach
2003–04	EBL 1	2	1st	22	20	2	40	0.909	Finalists	Semifinals (NT); Group Stage (BT)	Winners (NC)	Gary Stronach

Seasons 2004–2021
Season	Division	Tier	Regular Season						Post-Season	Trophy	Cup	Head coach
Season	Division	Tier	Finish	Played	Wins	Losses	Points	Win %	Post-Season	Trophy	Cup	Head coach
Plymouth Raiders
2004–05	BBL	1	9th	40	12	28	24	0.300	Did not qualify	Group Stage (BT)	Quarterfinals (BC)	Gary Stronach
2005–06	BBL	1	9th	40	16	24	32	0.400	Did not qualify	Group Stage (BT)	First Round (BC)	Gary Stronach
2006–07	BBL	1	5th	36	20	16	40	0.556	Quarterfinals	Winners (BT)	First Round (BC)	Gary Stronach
2007–08	BBL	1	3rd	33	24	9	48	0.727	Semifinals	Group Stage (BT)	First Round (BC)	Gary Stronach
2008–09	BBL	1	5th	33	20	13	40	0.606	Semifinals	Semifinals (BT)	Finalists (BC)	Gary Stronach
2009–10	BBL	1	10th	36	11	25	22	0.306	Did not qualify	First Round (BT)	Quarterfinals (BC)	Gary Stronach
2010–11	BBL	1	5th	33	19	14	38	0.576	Quarterfinals	Group Stage (BT)	Quarterfinals (BC)	Gavin Love
2011–12	BBL	1	4th	30	21	9	42	0.700	Quarterfinals	Finalists (BT)	Finalists (BC)	Gavin Love
2012–13	BBL	1	6th	33	19	14	38	0.576	Semifinals	First Round (BT)	Semifinals (BC)	Gavin Love
2013–14	BBL	1	9th	33	14	19	28	0.424	Did not qualify	Quarterfinals (BT)	Semifinals (BC)	Jay Marriott
2014–15	BBL	1	10th	36	11	25	22	0.306	Did not qualify	Semifinals (BT)	First Round (BC)	Jay Marriott
2015–16	BBL	1	9th	33	13	20	26	0.394	Did not qualify	Quarterfinals (BT)	First Round (BC)	Daryl Corletto
2016–17	BBL	1	9th	33	14	19	28	0.424	Did not qualify	Finalists (BT)	First Round (BC)	Jonathan White
2017–18	BBL	1	10th	33	8	25	16	0.242	Did not qualify	Quarterfinals (BT)	First Round (BC)	Gavin Love
2018–19	BBL	1	8th	33	16	17	32	0.485	Semifinals	Quarterfinals (BT)	Quarterfinals (BC)	Paul James
2019–20	BBL	1	Season cancelled due to COVID-19 pandemic							First Round (BT)	Group Stage (BC)	Paul James
2020–21	BBL	1	3rd	30	21	9	42	0.700	Semifinals	Finalists (BT)	Quarterfinals (BC)	Paul James

Season	Division	Tier	Regular Season					Post-Season	National Cup	Head coach
Season	Division	Tier	Finish	Played	Wins	Losses	Win %	Post-Season	National Cup	Head coach
Plymouth Raiders
2023–24	D3 Southwest	4	3rd	14	9	5	0.643	Did not qualify	Did not enter	Gareth Laws
2024–25	D3 Pool III	4	5th	18	12	6	0.667	Did not qualify	Round 2	Gareth Laws

== Players ==
=== Current roster ===
Note: Flags indicate national team eligibility at FIBA-sanctioned events. Players may hold other non-FIBA nationalities not displayed.

Plymouth Raiders roster
Players
Coaches

Pos.	No.	Nat.	Name	Ht.
G	0	(United States)	McGill, Rickey	6 ft 1 in (1.85 m)
F	2	(United Kingdom)	Hamilton, Ashley	6 ft 7 in (2.01 m)
G/F	3	(United States)	Porter-Bunton, Chris	6 ft 5 in (1.96 m)
G	4	(United Kingdom)	Lawrence, Andrew	6 ft 1 in (1.85 m)
G	5	(United Kingdom)	Walker, Isiah	6 ft 3 in (1.91 m)
G	8	(United Kingdom)	Neziri, Leon
F	9	(United Kingdom)	Sentance, Elliott	6 ft 4 in (1.93 m)
G	10	(United Kingdom)	Ubiaro, Denzel	6 ft 3 in (1.91 m)
G	12	(Albania)	Dusha, Elvisi	6 ft 1 in (1.85 m)
F	13	(Australia)	Beisty, Ryan	6 ft 7 in (2.01 m)
F/C	15	(United Kingdom)	Neighbour, Will	6 ft 11 in (2.11 m)
C	16	(Rwanda)	Ibeh, Prince	6 ft 10 in (2.08 m)
G/F	21	(United Kingdom)	Langridge-Barker, Liam	6 ft 4 in (1.93 m)
G	22	(United States)	Morsell, Mike	6 ft 6 in (1.98 m)
C	25	(United Kingdom)	Ochereobia, Michael	6 ft 8 in (2.03 m)

Head coach

- (United Kingdom) Paul James

Assistant coach(es)

Legend

- (C) Team captain
- Injured

- Roster

=== Notable players ===
Note: Flags indicate national team eligibility at FIBA-sanctioned events. Players may hold other non-FIBA nationalities not displayed.

Criteria

To appear in this section a player must have either:

- Set a club record or won an individual award while at the club
- Played at least one official international match for their national team at any time
- Played at least one official NBA match at any time.

- (United Kingdom) Duke-Jermaine Forbes
- (United Kingdom) Nick George
- (United Kingdom) Ashley Hamilton
- (United Kingdom) Andrew Lawrence
- (United Kingdom) Gavin Love
- (United Kingdom) Ben Mockford
- (United Kingdom) Gareth Murray
- (United Kingdom) Ryan Richards
- (United Kingdom) Anthony Rowe
- (United Kingdom) Gary Stronach
- (United Kingdom) Roderick Wellington
- (United Kingdom) Dean Williams
- (Albania) Elvisi Dusha
- (British Virgin Islands) Leslee Smith
- (Estonia) Joonas Järveläinen
- (Republic of Ireland) Colin O'Reilly
- (Lithuania) Evaldas Žabas
- (New Zealand) B. J. Anthony
- (Nigeria) Michael Ojo
- (Nigeria) Daniel Okonkwo
- (Netherlands) Gerald Robinson
- (Rwanda) Prince Ibeh
- (Sudan) Deng Deng
- (Sweden) Pierre Hampton
- (Sweden) Andreas Schreiber
- (United States) Carlton Aaron
- (United States) DeAntoine Beasley
- (United States) Jeremy Bell
- (United States) Micah Blunt
- (United States) Waymon Boone
- (United States) (United Kingdom) Rod Brown
- (United States) Dave Downey
- (United States) Terrence Durham
- (United States) Jon Goodemote
- (United States) Rashad Hassan
- (United States) Chris Hines
- (United States) Ted Hotaling
- (United States) Chris Hughey
- (United States) Andrew Lasker
- (United States) Jim McGilvery
- (United States) Paul Williams
- (United States Virgin Islands) Jerome Gumbs

=== Retired numbers ===
Plymouth Raiders retired numbers
No.	Nat.	Player	Position	Tenure
6	(United Kingdom)	Gavin Love	G	1996–2009
14	(United Kingdom)	Gary Stronach	G	1985–1999

== See also ==
- Plymouth City Patriots
