= BBL Cup =

British basketball competition

- Organising body: British Basketball League
- Founded: 2003
- First season: 2003–04
- Folded: 2022–23
- Country: Great Britain
- Confederation: FIBA Europe
- Number of teams: 10
- Last champions: London Lions (3rd title) (2022–23)
- Most championships: Newcastle Eagles (6 titles)
- TV partners: Sky Sports; YouTube
- 2022–23 BBL Cup

The British Basketball League Cup, often shortened to the BBL Cup, was an annual cup competition for the British Basketball League (BBL). It was one of two peripheral competitions operated by the League during the regular season, with the other being the BBL Trophy. The competition was usually played as a single game knock-out tournament, and was only contested by members of the British Basketball League. The final takes place in early January at the Arena Birmingham in Birmingham.

== History ==
The competition was established in 2003 following the British Basketball League's (BBL) decision to withdraw its members from the annual National Cup tournament after a disagreement regarding import-players merged with its organiser, the English Basketball Association (EBBA). The EBBA had introduced a ruling that teams could field only two work-permit holders and one other non-permit-holding import in National Cup games for the 2003-04 season, which would have severely deprived the BBL teams of their better players. Due to a sponsorship deal with confectionery company Haribo, the new competition was named the Haribo Cup and saw all ten BBL clubs compete in a single game knock-out format. Sheffield Sharks were crowned as the Cup's first victor's after an 83-70 win over Scottish Rocks at Birmingham's National Indoor Arena. Rocks were again finalists, and Runners-up, in the 2005 edition of the Cup which had been rebranded with its current name as the BBL Cup and was won by Brighton Bears, who had been hugely successful in the predecessor competition, the National Cup, in recent years. In 2006, Newcastle Eagles claimed a historic win over London Towers as part of their "clean-sweep" of all four BBL competitions in their quadruple-winning season.

The 2007 edition of the BBL Cup Final was the closest yet and saw Guildford Heat win their first piece of silverware in franchise history, whilst Scottish Rocks finished as Runners-up for the third time in four seasons. The following year saw perhaps the biggest upset in Cup Final history as underdogs Milton Keynes Lions sneaked to a 69-66 victory over favourites Newcastle. It would be the Lions' first Cup win, largely helped by their offence hitting 13 three-pointers. Everton Tigers continued the new winner every year tradition by thrashing Plymouth Raiders with a blow-out score of 103-49 in the 2009 Cup Final. The 54-point gap between the two debutants is the largest winning margin in Cup history.

Due to the intake of expansion franchises, the 2009–10 season saw an expanded First Round featuring 13 teams, the most teams ever competing for the BBL Cup in its history. It was also the first edition to not feature a new Champion as the Sheffield Sharks claimed their second Cup with a close 89-86 victory over Cheshire Jets in the Final. The following season saw Sheffield become the first team to successfully retain the Cup whilst their MVP winning star Steve Dagostino set a new record for the most points scored in a Final, posting 35. However that record only stood for one year as in the 2012 Final, as Newcastle's Charles Smith led his team to a 115-94 victory over Plymouth with an individual points tally of 39. Smith's record is currently still standing, whilst Newcastle also recorded the highest points scored for a team in any BBL final.

Leicester Riders claimed their first Cup title in the 2013 Final, with a close 85-80 victory over previous winners Newcastle Eagles. The Riders were led by MVP Jay Cousinard who posted 17 points for the first-time winners, and although dominating for much of the game, they survived a late Eagles comeback to hold on for the five-point win. Riders retained their title in 2014 with a three-point victory over Eagles again, becoming only the second team to win back-to-back Finals (the first was Sheffield Sharks in 2011).

== Format ==
The competition is a knockout tournament for the teams in the British Basketball League Championship, equating to the League Cup in soccer, with pairings drawn completely at random – there are no seeds, and a draw takes place after the majority of fixtures have been played in each round. When there are an uneven number of member clubs in the British Basketball League, some pre-selected teams will receive byes into the next round. The Cup final is played at the Arena Birmingham in Birmingham, usually in early January.

== Finals ==
Season	Winner	Score	Runners-up	Venue	Location	MVP
2003–04	Sheffield Sharks	83–70	Scottish Rocks	National Indoor Arena	Birmingham	(United States) Lynard Stewart
2004–05	Brighton Bears	90–74	Scottish Rocks	National Indoor Arena	Birmingham	(Barbados) Andrew Alleyne
2005–06	Newcastle Eagles	83–69	London Towers	National Indoor Arena	Birmingham	(United States) T.J. Walker
2006–07	Guildford Heat	82–79	Scottish Rocks	National Indoor Arena	Birmingham	(United States) Brian Dux
2007–08	Milton Keynes Lions	69–66	Newcastle Eagles	National Indoor Arena	Birmingham	(United States) Kevin Griffin
2008–09	Everton Tigers	103–49	Plymouth Raiders	National Indoor Arena	Birmingham	(United States) Andre Smith
2009–10	Sheffield Sharks	89–86	Cheshire Jets	National Indoor Arena	Birmingham	(United States) (United Kingdom) James Hamilton
2010–11	Sheffield Sharks	93–66	Mersey Tigers	National Indoor Arena	Birmingham	(United States) Steve Dagostino
2011–12	Newcastle Eagles	115–94	Plymouth Raiders	National Indoor Arena	Birmingham	(United States) (United Kingdom) Charles Smith
2012–13	Leicester Riders	85–80	Newcastle Eagles	National Indoor Arena	Birmingham	(United States) Jay Cousinard
2013–14	Leicester Riders	72–69	Newcastle Eagles	National Indoor Arena	Birmingham	(United Kingdom) Andrew Sullivan
2014–15	Newcastle Eagles	84–71	Glasgow Rocks	Barclaycard Arena	Birmingham	(United States) Rahmon Fletcher
2015–16	Newcastle Eagles	94–82	Leicester Riders	Barclaycard Arena	Birmingham	(United States) Rahmon Fletcher
2016–17	Newcastle Eagles	91–83	Glasgow Rocks	Barclaycard Arena	Birmingham	(United States) Rahmon Fletcher
2017–18	Cheshire Phoenix	99–88	Worcester Wolves	Barclaycard Arena	Birmingham	(United States) Malcolm Riley
2018–19	London Lions	68–54	Glasgow Rocks	Arena Birmingham	Birmingham	(United States) Brandon Peel
2019–20	Worcester Wolves	67–59	Bristol Flyers	Arena Birmingham	Birmingham	(United States) Amir Williams
2020–21	Newcastle Eagles	84–77	London Lions	Morningside Arena	Leicester	(United States) Justin Gordon
2021–22	Leicester Riders	83–69	Manchester Giants	Utilita Arena Birmingham	Birmingham	(United States) Geno Crandall
2022–23	London Lions	79–71	Leicester Riders	Utilita Arena Birmingham	Birmingham	(United States) Sam Dekker

== Results by team ==
Results by team
Team	Wins	Last final won	Runner-up	Last final lost	Total final appearances
Newcastle Eagles	6	2021	3	2014	9
Leicester Riders	3	2022	2	2023	5
London Lions	3	2023	1	2021	4
Sheffield Sharks	3	2011	0	0	3
Mersey Tigers	1	2009	1	2011	2
Cheshire Phoenix	1	2018	1	2010	2
Worcester Wolves	1	2020	1	2018	2
Guildford Heat	1	2007	0	0	1
Brighton Bears	1	2005	0	0	1
Glasgow Rocks	0	0	6	2019	6
Plymouth Raiders	0	0	2	2012	2
Bristol Flyers	0	0	1	2020	1
London Towers	0	0	1	2006	1
Manchester Giants	0	0	1	2022	1

== See also ==
- Basketball in England
- British Basketball League
- BBL Trophy
