= 2005–06 British Basketball League season =

2005–06 BBL season
- League: British Basketball League
- Sport: Basketball

Roll of Honour
- BBL champions: Newcastle Eagles
- Play Offs champions: Newcastle Eagles
- BBL Cup champions: Newcastle Eagles
- BBL Trophy champions: Newcastle Eagles

British Basketball League seasons
- 2004–05 2006–07

The 2005–06 BBL season was the 19th season of the British Basketball League, which ran from 23 September 2005 through to 11 April 2006. The season started earlier than usual because of England's participation in the 2006 Commonwealth Games, which took place during the regular season.

Eleven teams took to the court for the League Championship, which saw each team play each other four times (Twice at home and twice on the road) during the regular season. This was followed by the end of season playoffs which began on 14 April 2006 and ended with Finals weekend on 30 April 2006. One team change in the line-up saw the disappearance of long-time BBL member Thames Valley Tigers who were dissolved by the League after owner John Nike withdrew his financial backing. A consortium of fans bid to save the team resulted in a new franchise being formed, the Guildford Heat who occupied Tigers' place in the Championship.

A notable highlight of the season was Newcastle Eagles's incredible "clean sweep" of trophies winning the Championship, BBL Cup, BBL Trophy and finishing it off with a victory in the Play-off final against Scottish Rocks.

== Teams ==
Locations of the 2005–06 BBL teams

Team	City/Area	Arena	Capacity	Last season
Birmingham Bullets	Birmingham	North Solihull Sports Centre	1,000	11th
Brighton Bears	Brighton	Burgess Hill Triangle	1,800	5th
Chester Jets	Chester	Northgate Arena	1,000	1st
Guildford Heat	Guildford	Guildford Spectrum	1,100	New
Leicester Riders	Leicester	John Sanford Centre	800	10th
London Towers	London	Crystal Palace National Sports Centre	3,500	3rd
Milton Keynes Lions	Milton Keynes	Bletchley Centre	800	8th
Newcastle Eagles	Newcastle upon Tyne	Metro Radio Arena	6,500	2nd
Plymouth Raiders	Plymouth	Plymouth Pavilions	1,480	9th
Scottish Rocks	Glasgow	Braehead Arena	4,000	6th
Sheffield Sharks	Sheffield	Ponds Forge	1,600	4th

== Notable occurrences ==
- Guildford Heat made their debut appearance in the BBL on 1 October 2005, losing in overtime 89–88 to Newcastle Eagles at the Metro Radio Arena.
- Newcastle Eagles' Managing Director Paul Blake succeeded Vince Macaulay-Razaq as the new chairman of the BBL prior to the season opening, emphasising that he will strengthen links with England Basketball to lay the foundations for a successful national team.
- Newcastle picked up their first silverware of the season, with an 83–69 win over London Towers in the BBL Cup final at the National Indoor Arena, in Birmingham on 4 December. Eagles' TJ Walker was awarded MVP with 28 points, 12 rebounds and 4 assists.
- Birmingham Bullets owner Craig Bown breached league regulations when, on 26 January, he cancelled Bullets' home game against Milton Keynes Lions in protest of the suspensions of player Yorrick Williams and coach Skouson Harker. Bullets were docked 1 point.
- Former NBA star Dennis Rodman made his debut for Brighton Bears on 28 January, only days after leaving the Celebrity Big Brother house. He scored 4 points in 26 minutes of play against Guildford. Rodman went on to feature in three games for the Bears but later investigation found him to be ineligible and Brighton were docked 1 point by the league.
- The BBL Trophy was also won by Newcastle, who defeated Leicester Riders 71–50 at the SkyDome Arena in Coventry, on 5 February. Newcastle's Andrew Sullivan picked up the MVP with 18 points and 11 rebounds.
- Leicester's Tony Holley broke the record for the most rebounds in a BBL Trophy Final, bagging 19 in all and beating Alan Cunningham's previous best from 1991.
- Many clubs missed several of their top English players, who left for the 2006 Commonwealth Games which took place from 15 to 26 March. Peter Scantlebury MBE's England men's team returned hugely successful having defeated Nigeria 80–57 to bring home the bronze medal. The women's team also won bronze.

== BBL Championship (Tier 1) ==
=== Final standings ===
Each team played each other four times during the regular league season, twice at home and twice on the road. A dominant Newcastle team claimed the League title, with one game to spare against second-placed Scottish Rocks, adding their third piece of silverware for the season.

In their rookie season Guildford Heat finished an impressive fifth, with a 20–20 record, while former heavyweights Brighton Bears and Birmingham Bullets struggled, finishing eighth and last respectively. Both teams were docked one point each, Brighton for fielding an ineligible player against Guildford, while Birmingham owner Craig Bown breached league rules by cancelling the game against Milton Keynes Lions.

Pos	Team	Pld	W	L	%	Pts
1	Newcastle Eagles	40	30	10	0.750	60
2	Scottish Rocks	40	29	11	0.725	58
3	Sheffield Sharks	40	26	14	0.650	52
4	London Towers	40	22	18	0.550	44
5	Guildford Heat	40	20	20	0.500	40
6	Leicester Riders	40	18	22	0.450	36
7	Chester Jets	40	17	23	0.425	34
8	Brighton Bears +	40	17	23	0.425	33
9	Plymouth Raiders	40	16	24	0.400	32
10	Milton Keynes Lions	40	16	24	0.400	32
11	Birmingham Bullets ++	40	9	31	0.175	17

= League winners
= Qualified for the play-offs

+ Brighton Bears were docked 1 point for playing an ineligible player.
++ Birmingham Bullets were docked 1 point due to breach of League Regulations.

=== Playoffs ===
Quarter-finals
1	Newcastle Eagles	78
8	Brighton Bears	74
4	London Towers	81
5	Guildford Heat	99
2	Scottish Rocks	88
7	Chester Jets	70
3	Sheffield Sharks	101
6	Leicester Riders	85

Semi-finals
1	Newcastle Eagles	115
5	Guildford Heat	97
2	Scottish Rocks	101
3	Sheffield Sharks	84

Final
1	Newcastle Eagles	83
2	Scottish Rocks	68

==== Quarter-finals ====
14 April 2006

Newcastle Eagles	78–74	Brighton Bears

Metro Radio Arena, Newcastle upon Tyne

15 April 2006

London Towers	81–99	Guildford Heat

Crystal Palace National Sports Centre, London

15 April 2006

Scottish Rocks	88–70	Chester Jets

Braehead Arena, Glasgow

16 April 2006

Sheffield Sharks	101–85	Leicester Riders

Ponds Forge, Sheffield

==== Semi-finals ====
29 April 2006

Newcastle Eagles	115–97	Guildford Heat

National Indoor Arena, Birmingham

29 April 2006

Scottish Rocks	101–84	Sheffield Sharks

National Indoor Arena, Birmingham

==== Final ====
30 April 2006

Report

Newcastle Eagles	83–68	Scottish Rocks
Scoring by quarter: 12–19, 16–21, 25–10, 30–18
Pts: Charles Smith 22, Andrew Sullivan 19, Fab Flournoy 17		Pts: Julius Joseph 21, Frank Bennett 20, Jean François 10

National Indoor Arena, Birmingham

== National League Division 1 (Tier 2) ==
=== Final standings ===
Pos	Team	Pld	W	L	%	Pts
1	Worthing Thunder	26	23	3	0.885	46
2	Reading Rockets	26	22	4	0.846	44
3	City of Sheffield Arrows	26	20	6	0.769	40
4	Manchester Magic	26	19	7	0.731	38
5	Worcester Wolves	26	17	9	0.654	34
6	Essex & Herts Leopards	26	17	9	0.654	34
7	London United	26	14	12	0.538	28
8	Coventry Crusaders	26	14	12	0.538	28
9	Kingston Wildcats	26	11	15	0.423	22
10	Teesside Mohawks	26	8	18	0.308	16
11	PAWS London Capital	26	6	20	0.231	12
12	Solent Stars	26	4	22	0.154	8
13	King's Lynn Fury	26	4	22	0.154	8
14	Nottingham Knights	26	3	23	0.115	6

= League winners
= Qualified for the play-offs

== National League Division 2 (Tier 3) ==
=== Final standings ===
Pos	Team	Pld	W	L	%	Pts
1	West Hertfordshire Warriors	22	18	4	0.818	36
2	Mansfield Express	22	17	5	0.773	34
3	Northampton Neptunes	22	12	10	0.545	24
4	Derby Trailblazers	22	11	11	0.500	22
5	Liverpool	22	11	11	0.500	22
6	Plymouth Raiders II	22	11	11	0.500	22
7	Birmingham Aston Athletics	22	10	12	0.455	20
8	Tamar Valley Cannons	22	10	12	0.455	20
9	Newi Nets	22	9	13	0.409	18
10	Leicester Warriors	22	9	13	0.409	18
11	Colchester Tigers	22	7	15	0.318	14
12	Bath Romans	22	7	15	0.318	14

= League winners
= Qualified for the play-offs

== BBL Cup ==
=== First round ===
Team 1	Team 2	Score
Guildford Heat	Leicester Riders	69–65
Scottish Rocks	Birmingham Bullets	86–75
Milton Keynes Lions	Plymouth Raiders	84–66

=== Quarter-finals ===
Team 1	Team 2	Score
Chester Jets	Brighton Bears	94–82
Sheffield Sharks	Scottish Rocks	77–81 (OT)
London Towers	Milton Keynes Lions	81–66
Newcastle Eagles	Guildford Heat	82–63

=== Semi-finals ===
Team 1	Team 2	Score
Newcastle Eagles	Chester Jets	95–68
London Towers	Scottish Rocks	106–97 (OT)

=== Final ===
4 December 2005

Report

Newcastle Eagles	83–69	London Towers
Pts: TJ Walker (MVP) 28, Jeremy Hyatt 18, Andrew Sullivan 18, Fab Flournoy 10, Darius Defoe 4, Andrew Bridge 3, John Bryant 2		Pts: Quincey Wadley 24, Lynard Stewart 16, Niki Arinze 16, Chez Marks 11, Sullivan Phillips 2

National Indoor Arena, Birmingham
Attendance: ?
Eagles coach Fab Flournoy
Towers coach Robbie Peers

== BBL Trophy ==
=== Group stage ===
Northern Group

Team	Pts	Pld	W	L	Percent
1.Newcastle Eagles		8			
2.Scottish Rocks		8			
3.Sheffield Sharks		8			
4.Chester Jets		8			
5.Teesside Mohawks		8			

Midlands Group

Team	Pts	Pld	W	L	Percent
1.Leicester Riders		8			
2.Birmingham Bullets		8			
3.London Towers		8			
4.Milton Keynes Lions		8			
5.Essex & Herts Leopards		8			

Southern Group

Team	Pts	Pld	W	L	Percent
1.Guildford Heat		8			
2.Brighton Bears		8			
3.Plymouth Raiders		8			
4.Worthing Thunder		8			
5.London United		8			

=== Semi-finals ===
Team 1	Team 2	Score
Newcastle Eagles	Scottish Rocks	82–72
Guildford Heat	Leicester Riders	66–69

=== Final ===
5 February 2006

Report

Newcastle Eagles	71–50	Leicester Riders
Pts: Andrew Sullivan 18 (MVP), TJ Walker 14, Andrew Bridge 14, Jeremy Hyatt 11, Charles Smith 7, Fab Flournoy 7 Rebs: Andrew Sullivan, 11		Pts: Ryan Huntley 12, Deginald Erskine 12, Anthony McHenry 10, Steve Bucknall 7, Tony Holley 6, Joel Burns 3 Rebs: Tony Holley, 19

SkyDome Arena, Coventry
Attendance: ?
Eagles coach Fab Flournoy
Riders coach Karl Brown

== Statistics leaders ==
Category	Player	Stat
Points per game	(United States) Chez Marks (London Towers)	22.1
Rebounds per game	(United States) Shawn Jamison (Milton Keynes Lions)	13.7
Assists per game	(United States) TJ Walker (Newcastle Eagles)	8.1

Preceded by 2004–05 season	BBL seasons 2005–06	Succeeded by 2006–07 season
