= Vince Macaulay =

Personal information
- Born: 23 March 1961 (age 65) Liverpool, Lancashire, England

Career history

Playing
- 1978–1981: Liverpool Atac
- 1982–1986: Camden and Hampstead
- 1986–1988: Brixton Topcats
- 1988: Tower Hamlets
- 1988–1992: London Docklands/London Towers

Coaching
- 1993–???: Hemel Royals/Milton Keynes Lions
- 2007–2011: Milton Keynes Lions
- 2012–2015: London Lions
- 2018–2020: London Lions
- 2022–2023: Manchester Giants
- 2024: Artland Dragons

Vincent Babatunde Kwao Macaulay-Razaq, generally known as Vince Macaulay, is a British basketball coach.

== Career ==
Macaulay grew up in Lagos, Nigeria. He is a graduate of the London International Film School. In 1984, Macaulay and Jimmy Rogers founded the Brixton TopCats.

He had kicked off his basketball career with Liverpool Attac in 1978. He later played for Brixton TopCats, Tower Hamlets/London Towers and Hemel Royals. In 1998, when serving as the Watford Royals' chief executive, Macaulay relocated the club to Milton Keynes, naming it Milton Keynes Lions.

Under his reign as owner, Macaulay saw his team progress from whipping-boys to play-off contenders. On 17 May 2007, he returned to coaching the franchise for a third spell, after the dismissal of Tom Hancock. Macaulay had last coached the club when they were based in Hemel Hempstead and also stepped in as caretaker coach the last time Hancock was at the club in 1999. Following this period he was the Chairman of the BBL. He passed on the duty to Paul Blake, managing director of the Newcastle Eagles, in 2005. Macaulay also acted as a pundit for Sky Sports on NBA Sundays.

In 2012, Macaulay relocated the Lions franchise to London and became head coach of the club. Macaulay handed the job over to Nigel Lloyd in July 2015. In January 2018, Macaulay was back as head coach of the London team. In April 2020, US investment company 777 Partners bought the London Lions, Macaulay stayed involved as a minority stake holder and head coach. His reign as London head coach ended in January 2022.

In 2022, he was named head coach and general manager of the Manchester Giants of the British Basketball League. He parted company with the Giants after one season.

In June 2024, Macaulay was appointed head coach of the German ProA side Artland Dragons. He won the first four league games of the 2024–25 season with the Dragons, but was sacked on 11 November 2024 after having suffered defeat in the following five. Macaulay's company Hoops Basket C.I.C. acquired the Thames Valley Cavaliers in partnership with Nhamo Shire in August 2024 and changed the name of the programme to London Cavaliers in December 2024.

== See also ==
- British Basketball League
- London Lions(basketball)#Milton Keynes
