= Fabulous Flournoy =

British basketball player (born 1973)

Fabulous Flournoy MBE
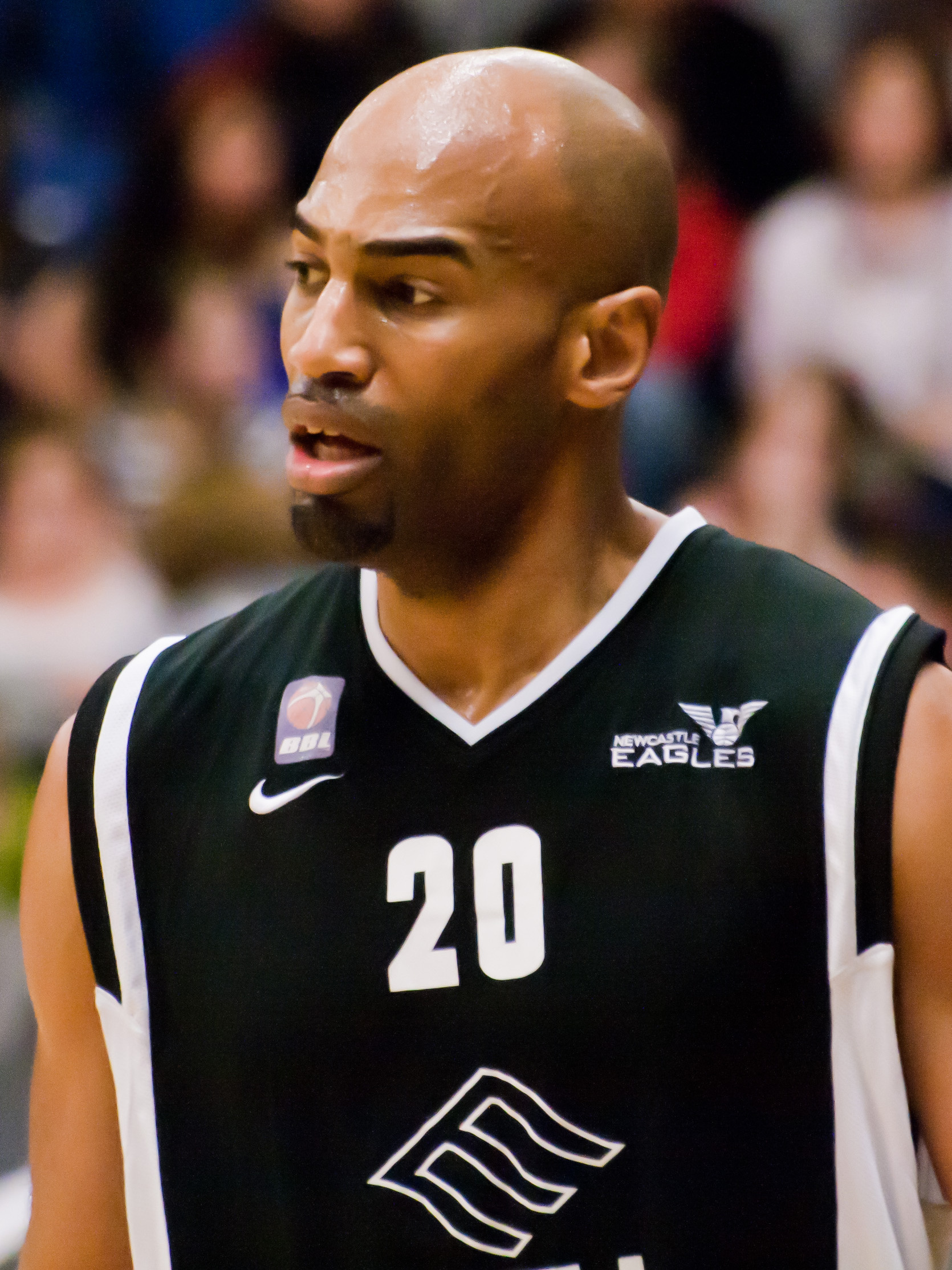
- Flournoy in 2011

Philadelphia 76ers
- Position: Assistant Coach / Player Development
- League: NBA

Personal information
- Born: 31 July 1973 (age 53) New York City, New York, United States
- Listed height: 6 ft 3 in (1.91 m)

Career information
- College: Panola College (1991–1993); McNeese State (1993–1995)
- NBA draft: 1995: undrafted
- Playing career: 1996–2019
- Coaching career: 2003–present

Career history

Playing
- 1996–2000: Birmingham Bullets
- 2000–2001: Sheffield Sharks
- 2001–2019: Newcastle Eagles

Coaching
- 2003–2019: Newcastle Eagles
- 2019–2023: Toronto Raptors (Assistant Video Coordinator / Player Development)
- 2023–present: Philadelphia 76ers (Assistant)
Medals
Men's basketball
Representing England
Commonwealth Games
Bronze medal – third place	2006 Melbourne	Team

Fabulous Flournoy MBE (born 31 July 1973) is a former professional basketball player who is currently an assistant coach for the Philadelphia 76ers of the National Basketball Association (NBA). He was previously the player-coach for the Newcastle Eagles, who compete in the British Basketball League.

He is the all-time leader in the BBL in assists, steals and blocked shots as well as 2nd all-time in rebounding and 5x BBL Coach of the Year. His 25 trophies remain a record for a coach in the league.

== Playing career ==
=== Early life and college career ===
Born in New York City, the 6'3" shooting guard/small forward, noted for his tenacious defense and very high standards, attended NJCAA Division 1 college Panola Junior College and was a student at McNeese State University.

=== British Basketball League ===
After finishing college in 1996, Flournoy signed for British Basketball League team the Birmingham Bullets, making his debut against the Greater London Leopards on 15 September 1996. In his first season, he clocked up 780 minutes averaging 8.5 points and 7 rebounds per game. Although his minutes were marginally shaved the following season, Flournoy still featured in all of the Bullets' 36 games, while helping his team to runners-up spot in the Championship and success in the playoffs, beating London Towers in the final.

The following two seasons saw his appearances drop, featuring in only 23 games in the 1999–2000 season, although he still featured in the playoff final against Manchester Giants where he posted 12 points in the Bullets' 65–74 loss. At the end of the season Flournoy signed for rival franchise Sheffield Sharks where he spent one year, playing in 34 games. With Flournoy's help, the Sharks won the BBL Northern Conference and again for Flournoy, finished as runners-up in the post-season playoffs, this time losing 75–84 to the Leicester Riders.

Flournoy moved again in 2001 when he signed for the Newcastle Eagles. After two mediocre seasons, he achieved two career-high records in the 2003–04 season, where he played 1258 minutes with a 10.75 PPG average.

=== As a player-coach ===
This was also the season when his career took a different turn accepting the role of head coach of the Eagles, while still a player, leading the team to a 6th-place finish and a quarterfinal playoff exit with a 94–96 defeat to the Towers.

Flournoy returned the following year and was successful with Newcastle. Clocking up 1,018 minutes, 6.92 PPG and 4.95 RPG in the 2004–05 season, Flournoy had a less than outstanding season on court. However, off-court he led the Eagles to victories in both the playoffs and the BBL Trophy, while finishing as runners-up to the Chester Jets in the Championship, and won the BBL Coach of the Season Award.

The 2005–06 season would prove to be even more remarkable for Fab, averaging 8.80 PPG and picking up 1,121 minutes of action while leading the Eagles to the "Clean Sweep" of victories in the BBL Cup, Trophy, Championship and playoffs, a feat repeated in 2011 and 2015.

== International career ==
A naturalised UK citizen, Flournoy won a bronze medal with the England national team at the 2006 Commonwealth Games in Melbourne. He earned 16 caps in total for England.

== Awards and honours ==
Flournoy was appointed Member of the Order of the British Empire (MBE) in the 2017 New Year Honours for services to British basketball and the community in the North East.

== Post-playing career ==
He has also served as a colour commentator for BBC Radio, including at the 2012 Olympic Games. In 2019, Flournoy was hired as an assistant video coordinator by the Toronto Raptors of the NBA. The move reunited Flournoy with his former coach, Nick Nurse. Nurse was responsible for signing Flournoy to his first professional contract as a player for the Birmingham Bullets in 1996.

On September 5, 2023, Flournoy became an assistant coach for the Philadelphia 76ers.
