= Julius Joseph (basketball) =

British basketball player

Personal information
- Born: 16 November 1975 (age 50) London, England
Medals
Men's basketball
Representing England
Commonwealth Games
Bronze medal – third place	2006 Melbourne	Team

Julius Joseph MBE (born 16 November 1975 in London, England) is a British professional basketball player, and currently plays for the Westminster Warriors in the English Basketball League.

Educated at Georgia College & State University (1997–2000), 6 ft 4 in Joseph was a member of the British student team that competed at the World Student Games in 1997, 1999 and 2001; he has played as a forward in both senior rosters of the England national team and the Great Britain team.

== Career ==
Joseph began his playing career in 1996 at Westminster Warriors of the UK National Basketball League, this before going to college. He turned professional in 2000, signing to the Manchester Giants; in 26 appearances for the Giants, Joseph averaged 17.12 points-per-game and 4.96 rebounds-per-game. In 2001 he signed-up to play three seasons for the Belgian Euphony Bree team. Joseph returned to the UK in 2004, to play for the Scottish Rocks, but after five appearances (12.50 PPG, 5.00 RPG), he returned to Belgium for the (2004–05) season to play for Colfontaine. In 2005–06 he played for the Scottish Rocks, where he averaged 18.73 PPG and 4.94 RPG, and helped the team reach the final of the BBL Championship Play-offs, losing out to the Newcastle Eagles. In 2008 Joseph signed for the Guildford Heat. In 2013 summer signed to London Lions and is also current Coach local teams in Harrow and Brent such as Harrow Blackhawks and Brent Ballers. In 2014, Joseph founded the "Ball out 3x3 basketball" tournament which is a part of the FIBA 3x3 World Tour. In May 2021, Joseph became the Head Coach of England men's 3x3 National Basketball Team. On 2 August 2022, Joseph helped coach the England men's national basketball team to their first ever gold medal in basketball at the 2022 Commonwealth Games in Birmingham.
