= Tom Sherlock =

British basketball player

Personal information
- Born: 1 October 1981 (age 45) Derby, England
- Listed height: 6 ft 8 1/4 in (2.04 m)
- Listed weight: 210 lb (95 kg)

Career information
- High school: Mid-Prairie (Wellman, Iowa)
- College: Wayne State (NE) (2002–2006)
- NBA draft: 2006: undrafted
- Playing career: 1998–2013
- Position: Forward
- Number: 7

Career history
- 2006–2008: Newcastle Eagles
- 2010–2012: Leicester Riders
- ?–?: Derby Storm, Mansfield Express, Derby Trailblazers

Career highlights
- BBL champion (2008); EBL champion (1998); High School All American (2000); BBL Runner up (2007); BBL Runner up (2012)

Tom Sherlock is a retired British professional basketball player formerly played for the Leicester Riders and Newcastle Eagles in the British Basketball League (BBL).

== Early life ==
Sherlock was born on 1 October 1981 in Derby, England, to Rob and Karen Sherlock. He started out playing for his hometown's BBL franchise, the Derby Storm, when he was just 17, before moving on to Mansfield Express in 1999, where he played alongside future Newcastle Eagles teammate Andrew Bridge.

== United States schooling ==
In 2000 Sherlock moved to the United States to begin his basketball education at Mid-Prairie High School in Wellman, Iowa. He played one season in Iowa averaging 18 pts, 9 rebounds, 3 steals and 1 block per game gaining a McDonald's All-American nomination.

On moving to college he found himself in Wayne, Nebraska at Wayne State College where the Wildcats play in the NCAA Division II basketball programme out of the Northern Sun Intercollegiate Conference (NSIC). Tom majored in computer information systems in a five-year college stay. He spent his first year in 2001–02 sitting out as a red-shirt.

His college career started in 2002–03 playing in 26 games. Earning 13 starts he finished the season with a 3.5 pts and 2.4 rebounds per game average. He led the team in 3-point % and was third on blocked shots. In 2003–04 he played in 24 games averaging 3.1 pts and 1.5 rebounds. Second on the team in blocks he had a 48.2% field goal percentage and shot 71.4% from the charity stripe. In 2004–05 where he appeared in 23 games and averaged 2.2 points and 1.7 rebounds with a season high performance of 10 pts and 12 rebounds in a 97–75 win at Augustana. Sherlock represented Great Britain Students at the World Student games in Izmir, Turkey (2005). Playing in Turkey and Finland for the representative squad.

In his final senior year Sherlock upped his numbers considerably with a 9.2 pts average, leading the team in both field goal percentage (50%) and rebounds (5.3) per game in just 23 minutes a game. He played in all 25 games of the season and was named top rebounder at the Minnesota State Pepsi Tip Off Classic grabbing 18 boards in two games including a career high 12 vs Minnesota State Mavericks. Ranking 11th in rebounding in the NSIC he was also fifth in field goal shooting at 50% and had a 41.2% average from 3-point range. Sherlock is described as an inside threat that can also hit the long ball, as well as an extremely hard worker who is keen to learn.

== Post-college ==
Sherlock signed for Newcastle Eagles in 2006 after he was spotted at an open trials session where he was the outstanding player of the two-day camp.

He made his professional debut for the Eagles on 29 September 2006, in a home game against title-rivals Sheffield Sharks, and went on to become a key figure in the team's successful Playoff-winning season, as well as picking up a runners-up medal in the BBL Trophy, in his rookie season. Overall, Sherlock played in 30 games during the season, where he averaged 14.8 minutes, 6.73 points and 4.13 rebounds per game.

His second season at the club saw reduced minutes in light of a deeper roster and tougher competition. On 30 October 2007 it was announced that Sherlock had left the club by mutual consent. In four games he averaged just 8.84 minutes and 2.5 points per game.

He made his debut for hometown club Derby Trailblazers in EBL Division One on 10 November 2007 against West Anglia Fury, coming back from a slight ankle sprain to post 12 points. After just four games Sherlock underwent surgery on his right knee and ankle to cure long-term problems.

== Current team ==
Sherlock signed on to the Leicester Riders for the 2010–11 season, and currently plays forward as No. 7.
