= Nyidier Riak =

South Sudanese basketball player (born 1997)

Personal information
- Born: 11 December 1997 (age 28) Melbourne, Australia
- Listed height: 190 cm (6 ft 3 in)

Career information
- College: Panola College (2018–2020)
- Position: Forward

Career history
- 2022: Woodville Warriors
- 2023: Geelong United Supercats
- 2024: Wyndham Devils
- 2025: South West Slammers
- 2026–present: Wyndham Devils

Nyidier Riak (born 11 December 1997) is a South Sudanese-Australian basketball player who plays as a forward. She currently plays for the South West Slammers in the Australian NBL1 West and represents the South Sudan women's national basketball team in international competitions.

== Early life and college career ==
Born in Melbourne, Australia, Riak began playing basketball competitively during her late teens. She moved to the United States to play college basketball at the junior college level for Panola College in Carthage, Texas. During her freshman (2018–2019) and sophomore (2019–2020) seasons, she played as a forward for the Panola Fillies.

== Professional career ==
Following her college career, Riak returned to Australia and has played extensively across various state basketball leagues. In 2022, she played for the Woodville Warriors in the NBL1 Central, based in Adelaide.

For the 2023 season, she joined the Geelong United Supercats in the NBL1 South. She subsequently competed for the Wyndham Devils in the Big V league before signing with the South West Slammers of the NBL1 West for the 2025 season. Riak re-signed with the Wyndham Devils for the upcoming season.

Alongside her playing career, Riak has worked as a coach and mentor in youth basketball programs around Melbourne, including the Helping Hoops initiative, focusing on developing young female athletes (Helping Hoops, 2024).

== National team career ==
Riak represents the South Sudan women's national basketball team. She made her major international debut during the 2023 FIBA Women's AfroBasket Zone 5 Qualifiers held in Rwanda where South Sudan got a third-place finish. She also represented the national team during the 2025 FIBA Women's AfroBasket Qualifiers.
