= Jimmy Rogers (basketball, born 1939) =

James Aggrey Rogers (December 17, 1939 – October 1, 2018) was a British basketball coach, player and builder.

== Life ==
Rogers was born in Wales. His mother had Welsh and Barbadian roots and was a dancer. His African-American father was a soldier and merchant seaman. Rogers never met his parents, he grew up in an orphanage in Newcastle upon Tyne and in a foster family in County Durham, where he picked up the sport of basketball.

He joined the British Army at age 15 and later became a fitness instructor for his regiment. While serving a seven-year stint in West Germany, Rogers played for VfL Osnabrück.

He returned to the United Kingdom in 1966 and settled in Liverpool. He played basketball at Liverpool YMCA, where he also started coaching. In 1968, Rogers was a member of the British national team. In 1971, as a player-coach he guided the Liverpool Police basketball team to the British national championship title. Rogers took up a job at Ford Motor Company and as a coach taught the game of basketball to the youth in Toxteth, an inner-city area of Liverpool. With his Toxteth players he formed the team Liverpool Atac. Thanks to his youth work at Toxteth, he was employed as a Community Relations Officer.

In 1980, Rogers moved to Brixton to work for the Brixton Young Families Housing Association. He joined the Crystal Palace coaching staff. In 1981, he started coaching youngsters at a gym in Tulse Hill, a group which later was described as the “early formations of a Brixton basketball programme“.

Rogers helped establish the Southside Stealers, the first women’s basketball team in London. He was among the founders of the New Educational Recreational Association, which was established in 1984 and changed its name to Brixton Topcats in 1985.

As a long-time coach of the Brixton Topcats, Rogers developed numerous teenagers who later entered the professional ranks, including Luol Deng, Eric Boateng, Justin Robinson, Matthew Bryan-Amaning, Andrea Congreaves. He was also a mentor of British basketball figure Vince Macaulay. Rogers got the nickname “The Bishop of Brixton“.

Basketball journalist Mark Woods called Rogers “a seminal figure in British basketball“. According to The Guardian, Rogers was the “father of British basketball“ and “a legend of the sport in this country“. According to Basketball England, Rogers was “tough, straight-talking and generous to the core“, while Luol Deng stated that Rogers “has done so much for the community helping thousands of kids get off the streets and do something constructive with their lives.“ Basketball England named Rogers among “the black pioneers who helped to shape British basketball“. He is also known for his motto “Drive the body!“.

Rogers died from lung cancer in 2018.
