= Panola College =

Community college in Carthage, Texas, US

- Type: Community college
- Established: 1947
- President: Jessica Pace
- Location: Carthage, Texas, United States; 32.156384°N 94.356283°W
- Campus: 135 acres
- Colors: Green and white
- Nickname: Pony
- Website: www.panola.edu

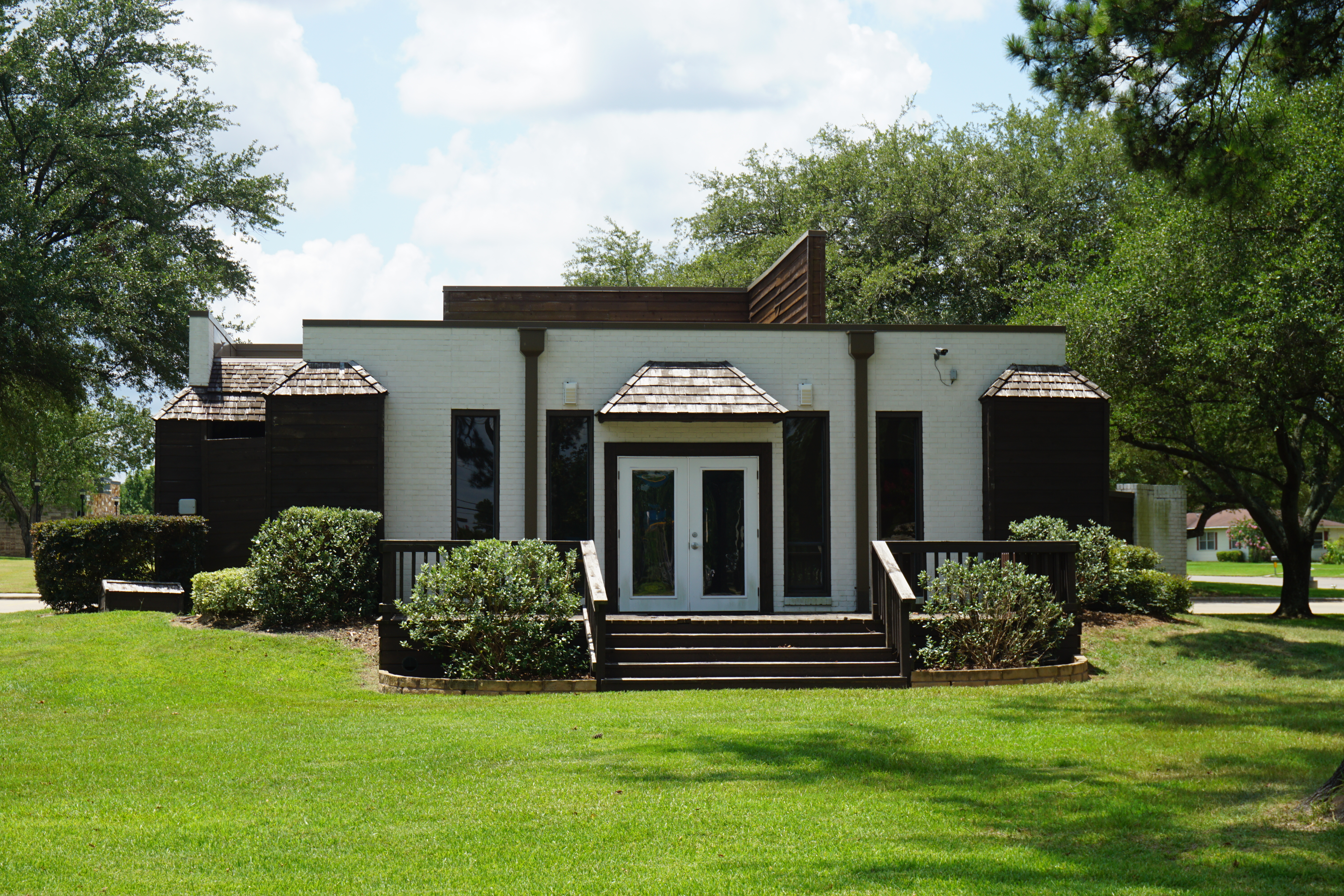
The Sid Baker Turner Memorial Chapel on the Panola College campus has a rustic appearance.

Panola College is a public community college in Carthage, Texas, the county seat of Panola County. As defined by the Texas Legislature, the official service area of Panola College includes:

- all of Marion, Panola, and Shelby Counties, and
- all of Harrison County excluding the territory within the Hallsville Independent School District.

== History ==
Panola College was established June 14, 1947, and began operations on January 19, 1948, at the corner of State Highway 315 and U.S. Highway 79, where it continues to operate today. The first permanent buildings were erected in 1949.

In 1995, the adjacent counties of Harrison (excluding parts as noted above), Marion, and Shelby were added by law to Panola's designated service area. Panola operates branch locations in Marshall and Center.

The college also serves residents of nearby Louisiana parishes (as Panola County is on the state border) and United States Air Force members stationed at Barksdale Air Force Base.

The first president of Panola County Junior College was B. W. Musgraves (1948–50). He was succeeded by Floyd Boze (1950–51), M. P. Baker (1951–67), former Carthage school superintendent Q. M. Martin (1967–73), Dr. Charles Hays (1973–74), longtime PJC basketball coach Arthur M. Johnson (1974–81), Dr. Gary McDaniel (1981–92), Charles Hughes (1992–93), Dr. William Edmonson (1993–2000), and Dr. Gregory Powell, (2000–Present).

In the spring of 1948, 55 charter students enrolled in the initial courses. In the fall of 2012, Panola College enrollment reached 2,584 students.

== Athletics ==
Panola College plays the following sports.

- Volleyball
- Basketball, men's
- Basketball, women's
- Baseball
- Rodeo

The teams are known as the Ponies, with the women's teams called the Fillies. Panola has won three NJCAA national championships, a baseball championship in 1969, and a pair of women's basketball crowns in 1977 and 1978. Panola plays in the Region XIV Athletic Conference, a part of the NJCAA.

== Notable alumni ==
- Chad Dallas, professional baseball player
- Fabulous Flournoy, current assistant coach with the Toronto Raptors, former player and the head coach for basketball team Newcastle Eagles, who compete in the British Basketball League.
- Dexter Shouse, former professional basketball player, played for Panola during the 1981–82 and 1982–83 seasons

== Gallery ==
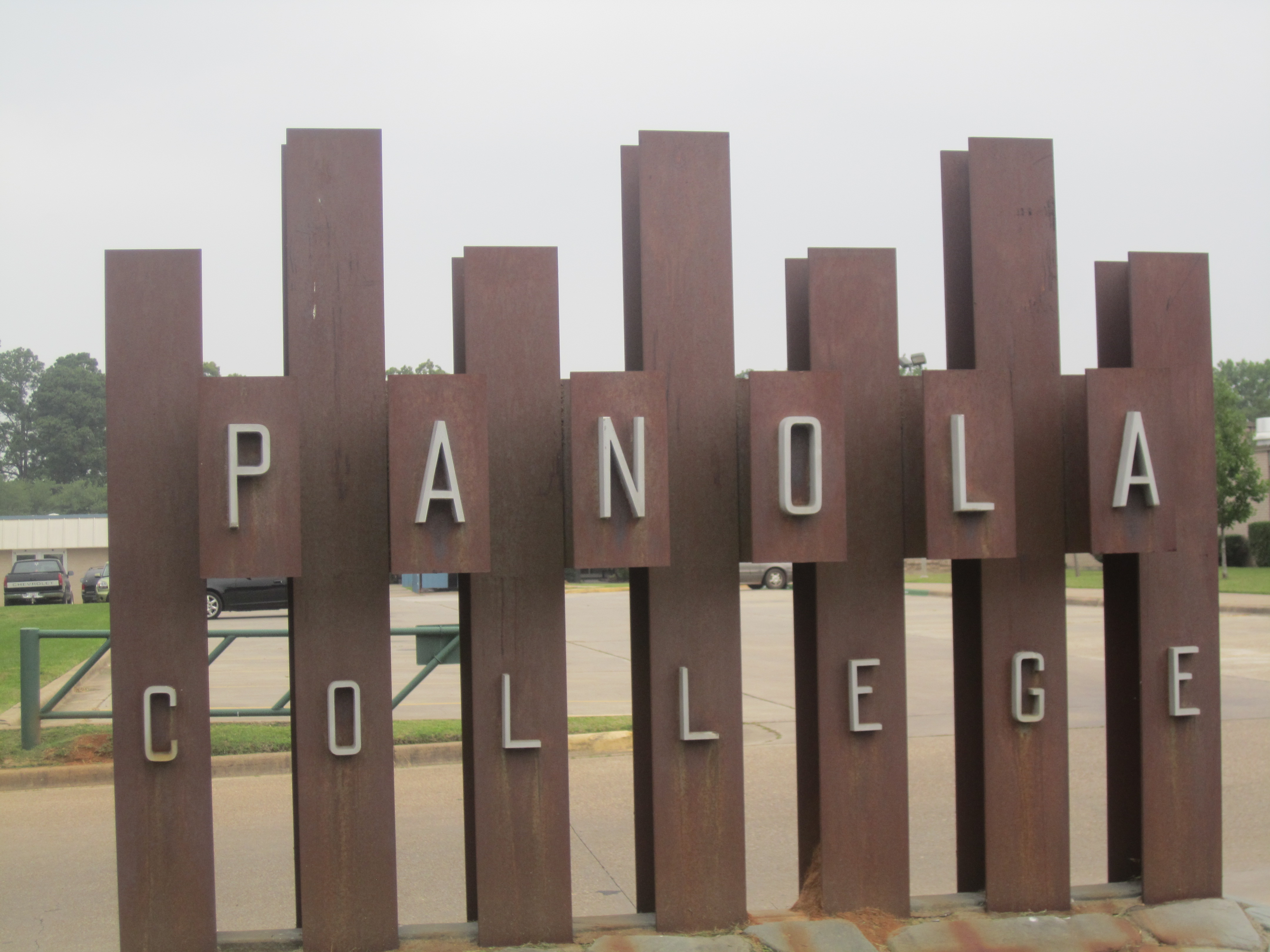
Panola College sign

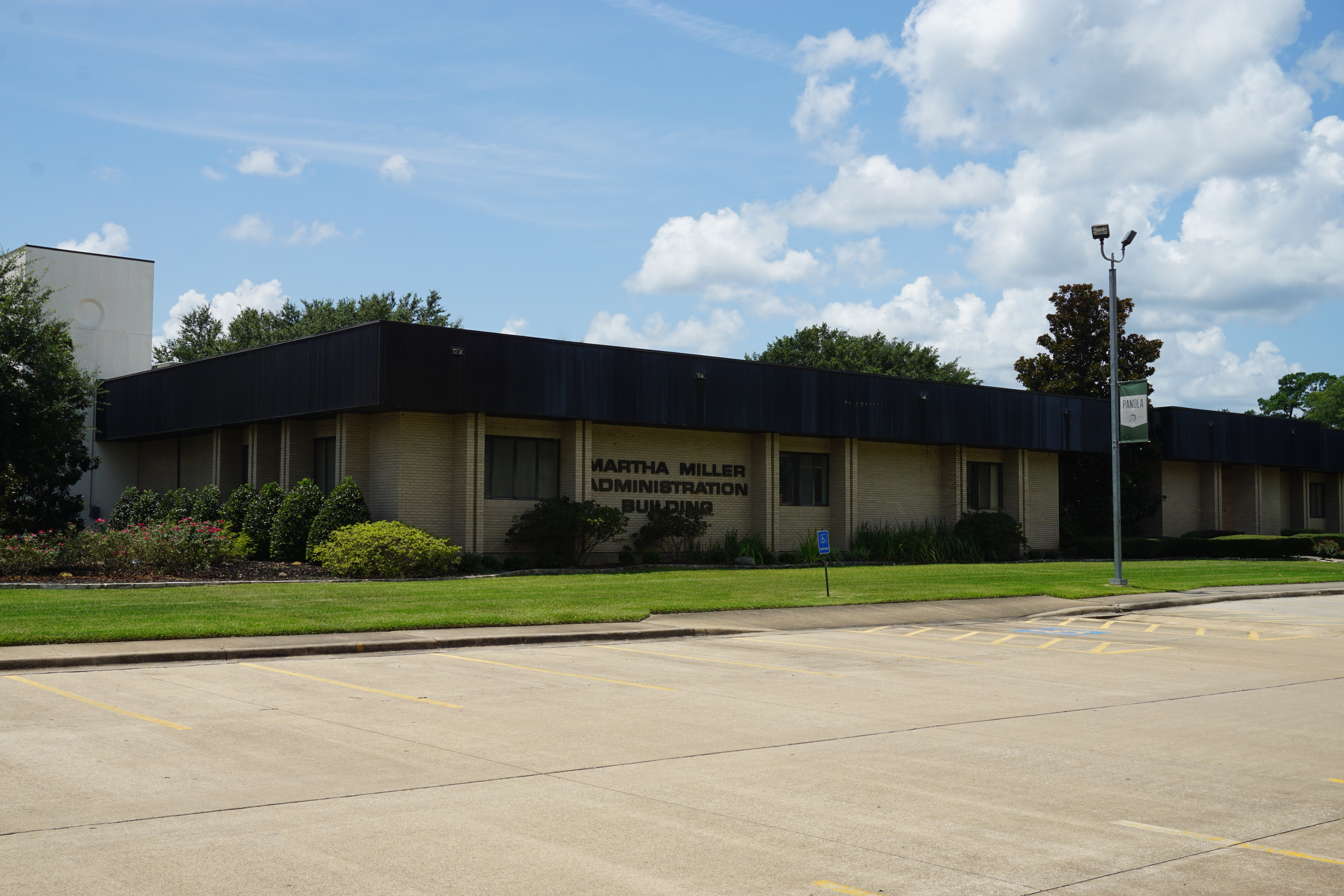
Martha Miller Administration Building

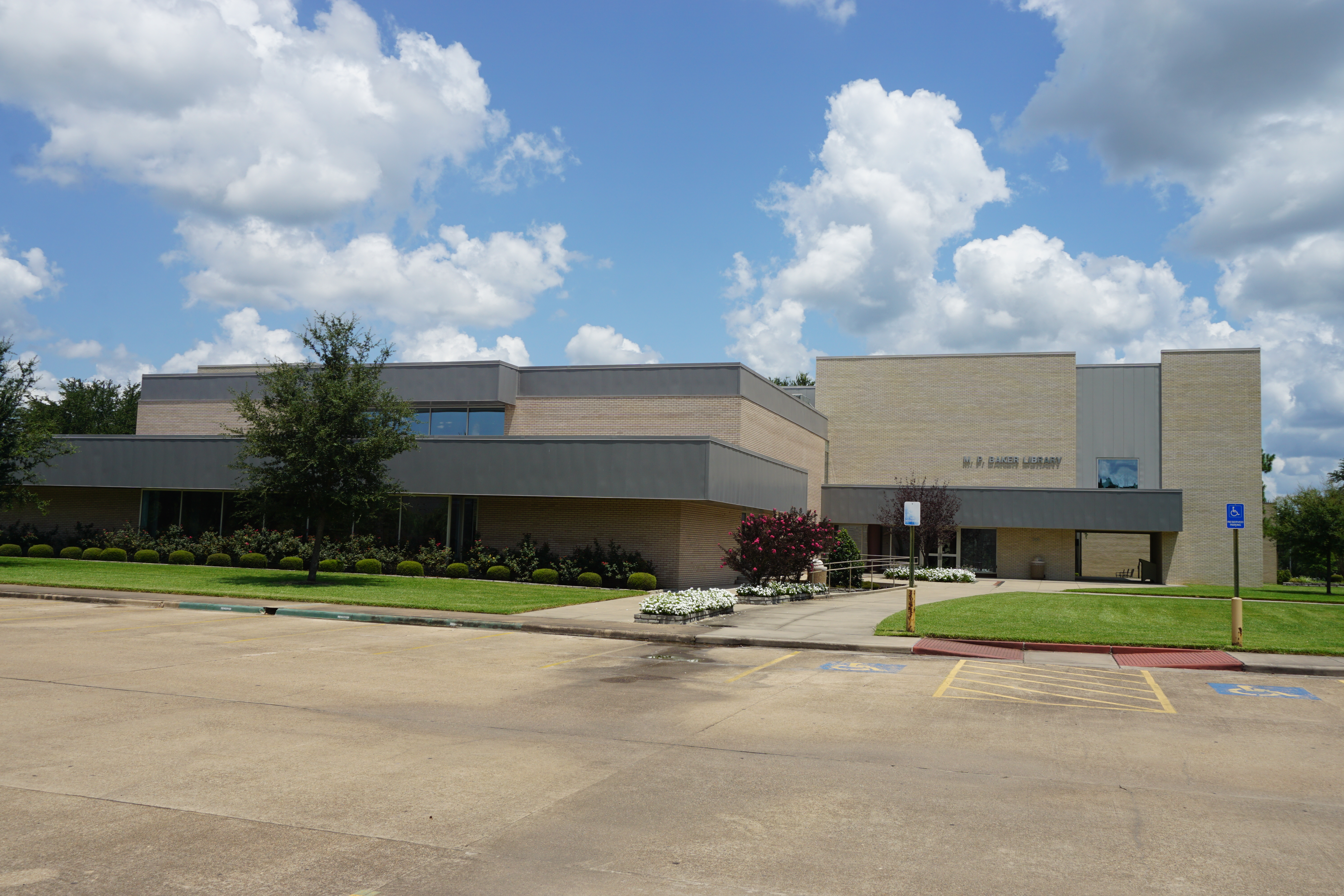
M. P. Baker Library

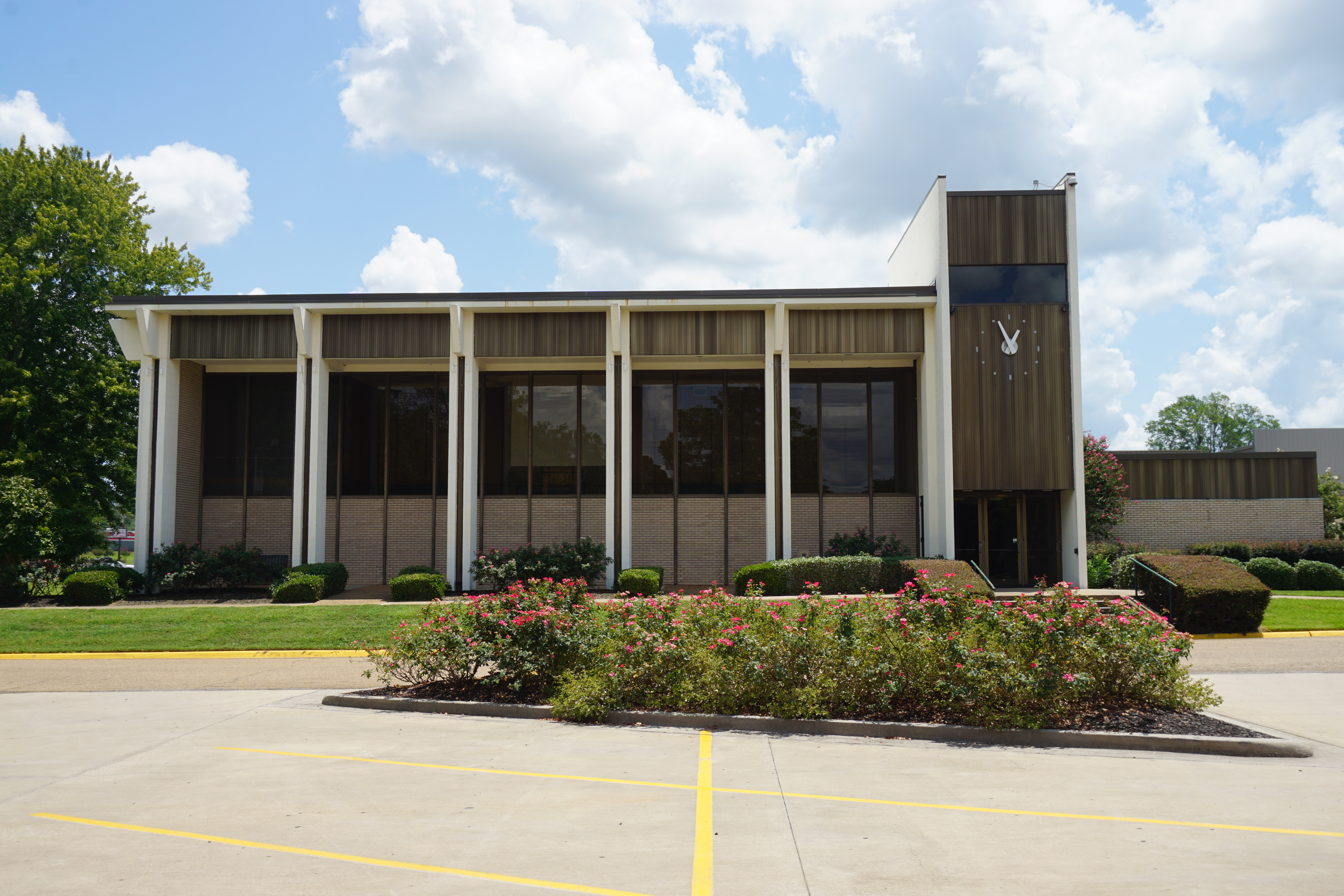
Quintin M. Martin Auditorium

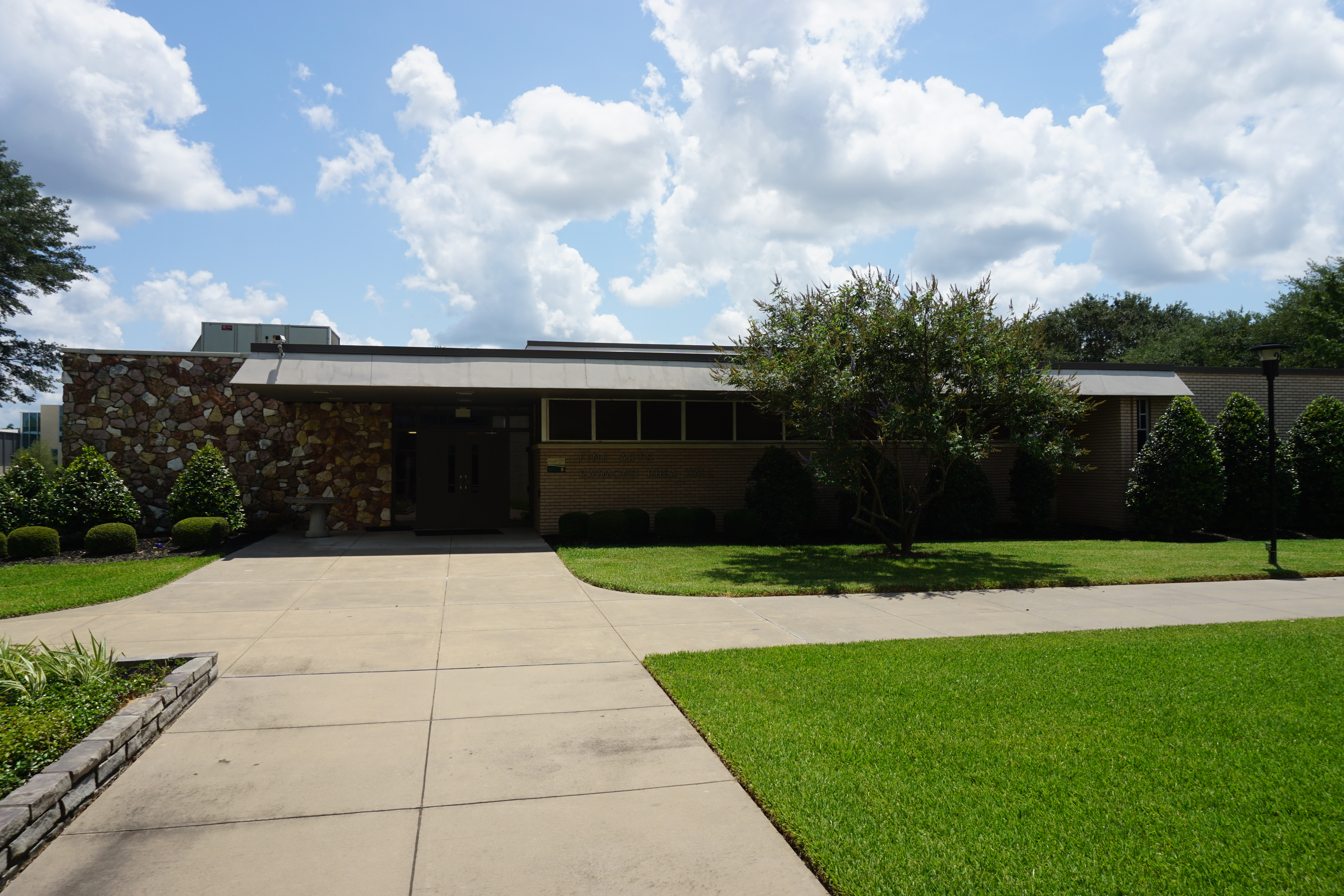
Raymond Rhea Fine Arts Building

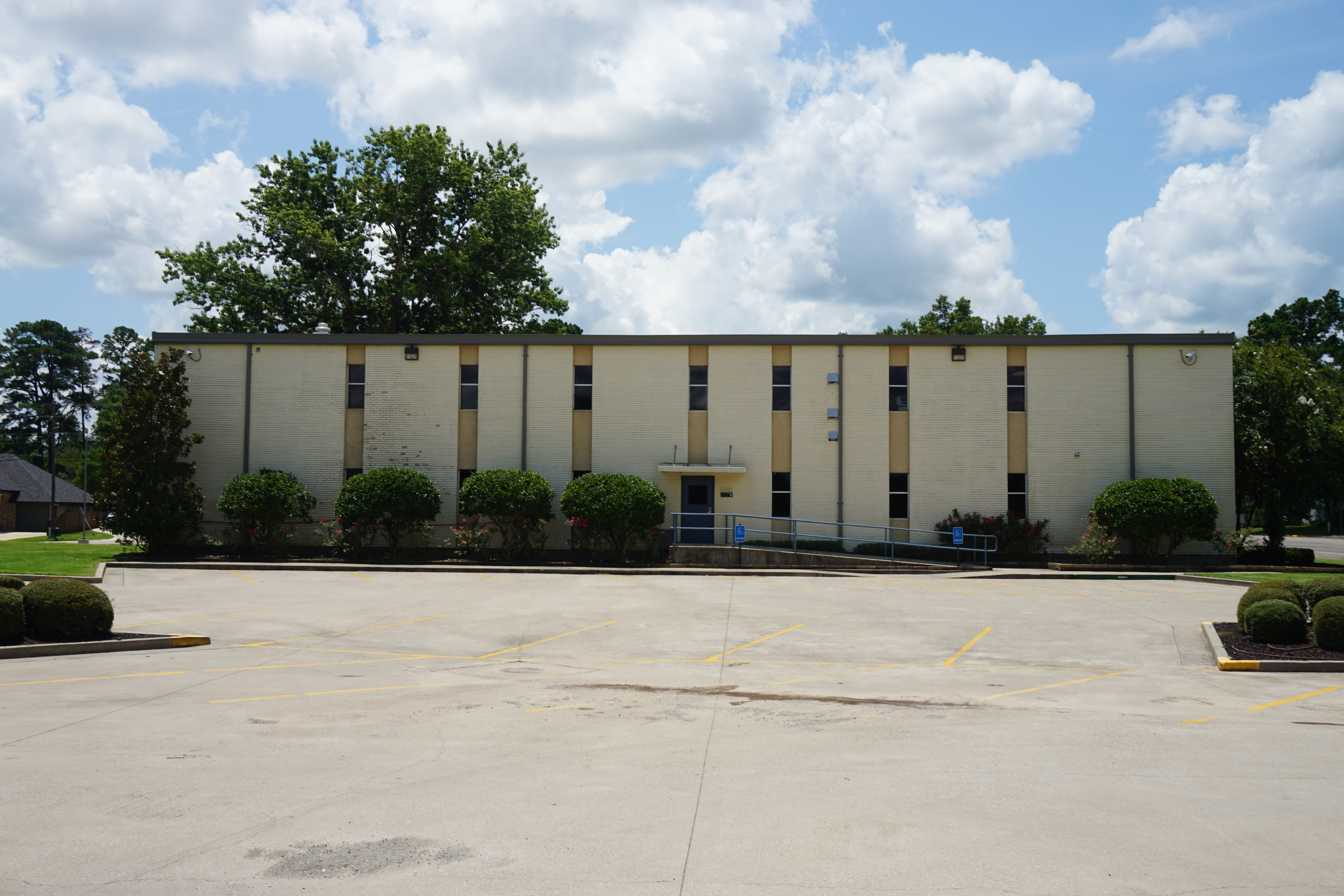
Merle Glass School of Cosmetology

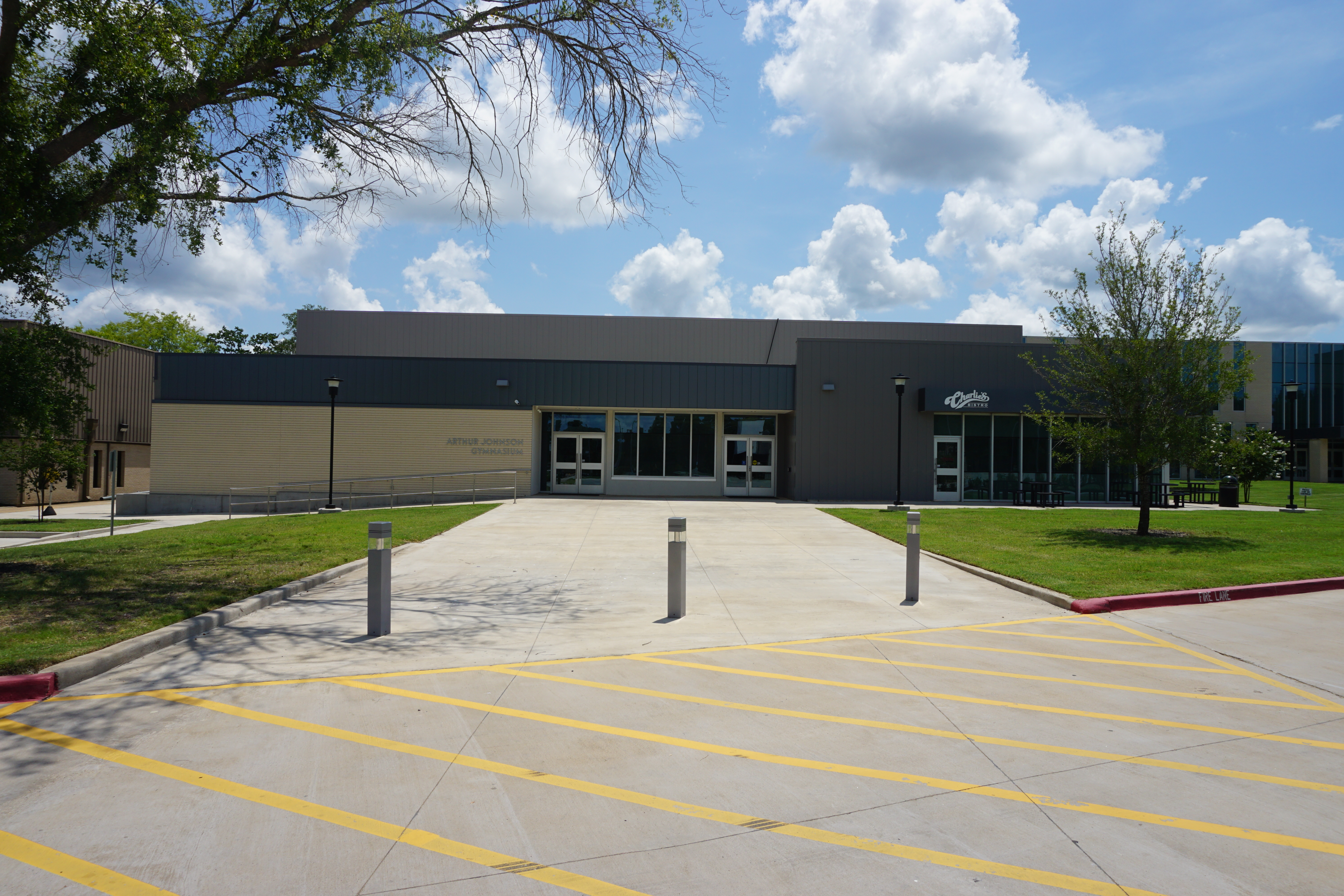
Arthur M. Johnson Gymnasium

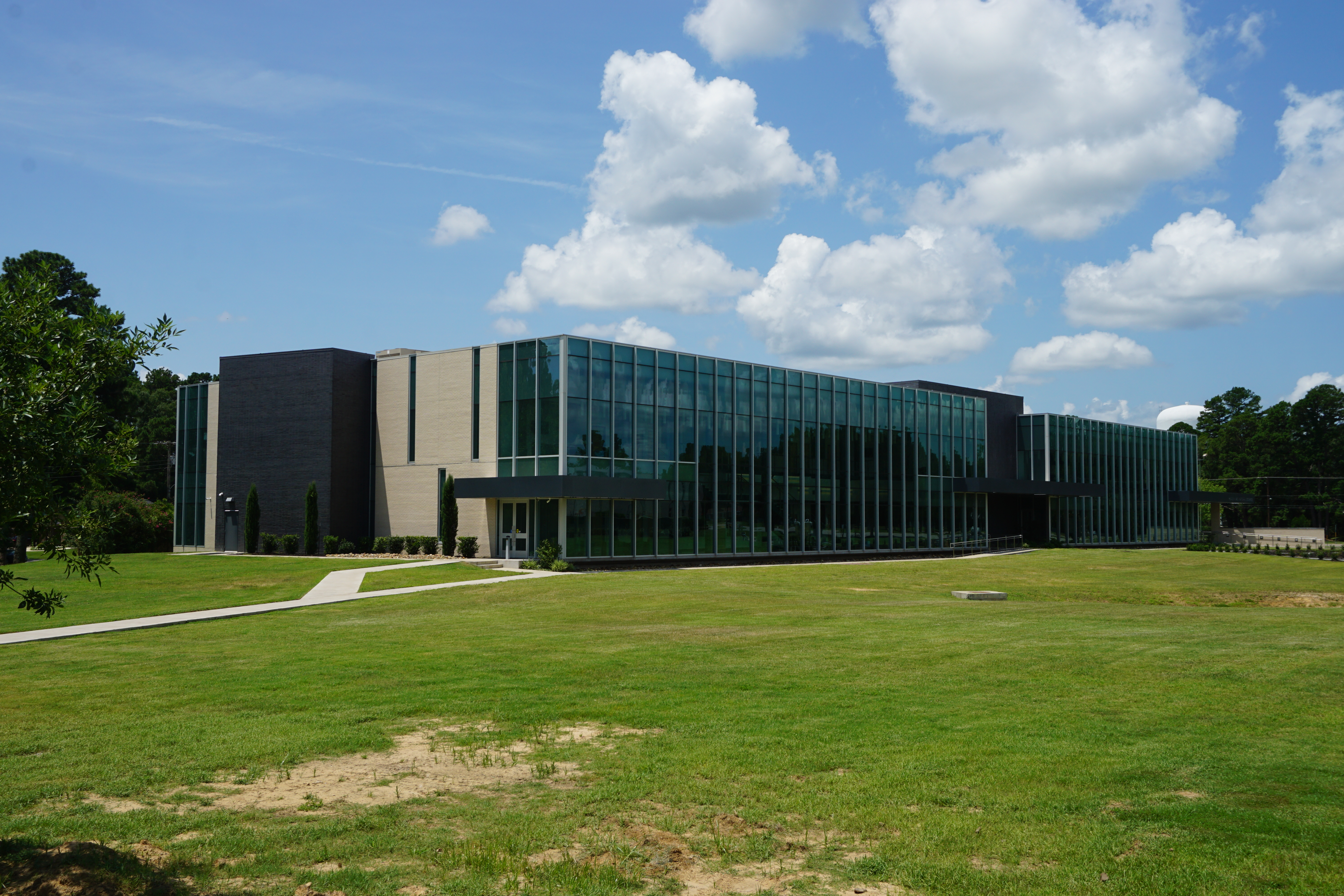
Health and Natural Sciences Building

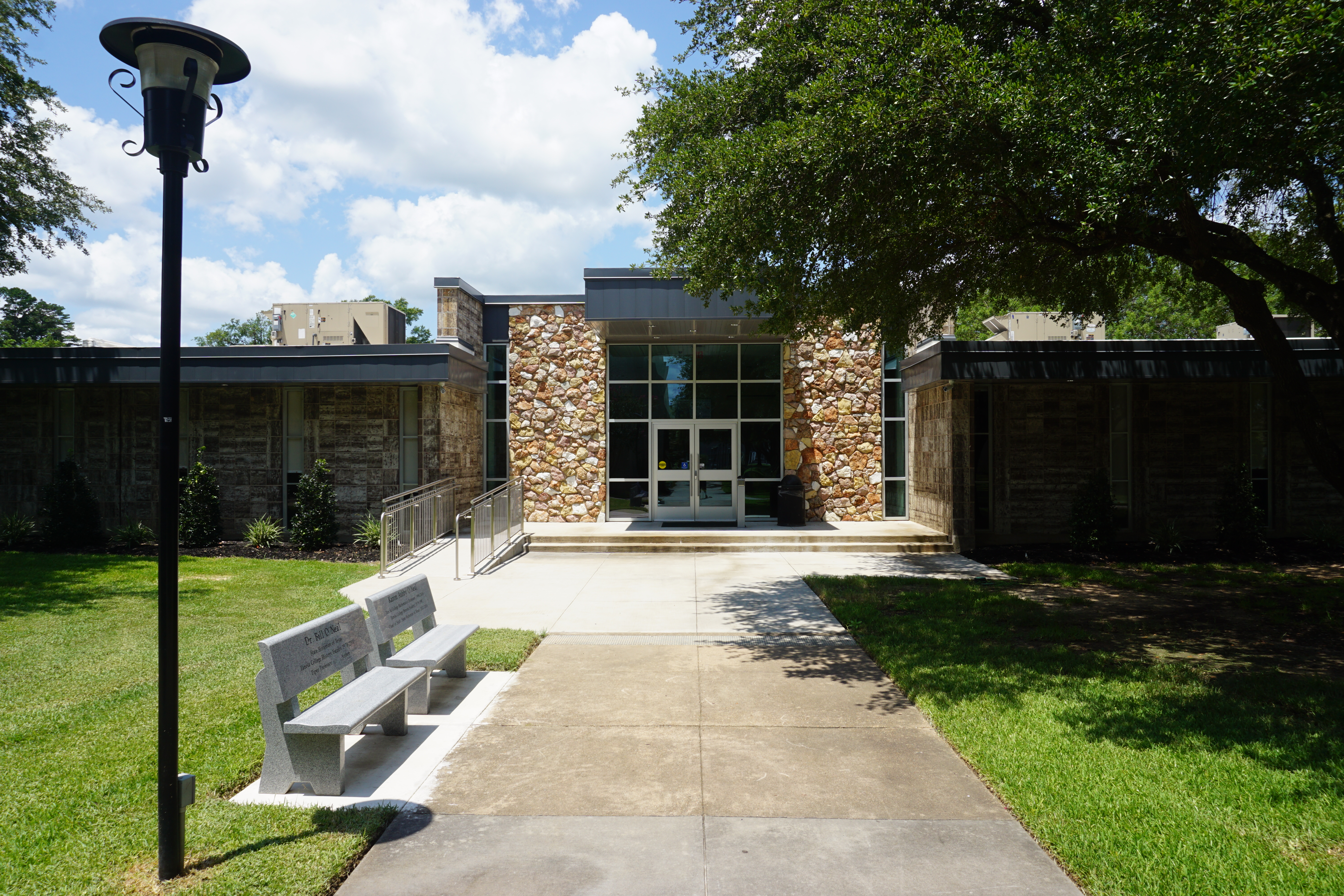
Roy Monk Science Building

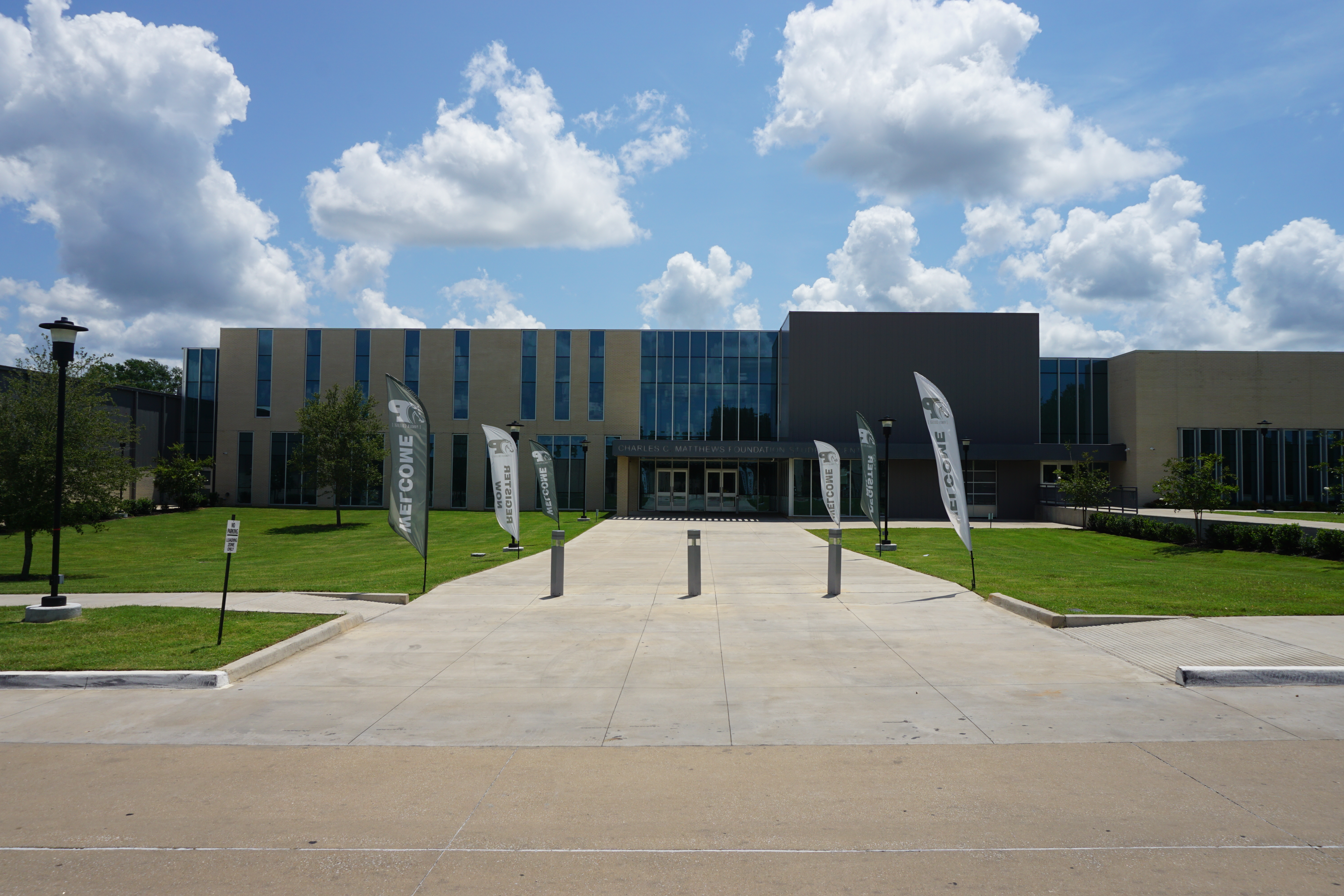
Charles C. Matthews Foundation Student Center

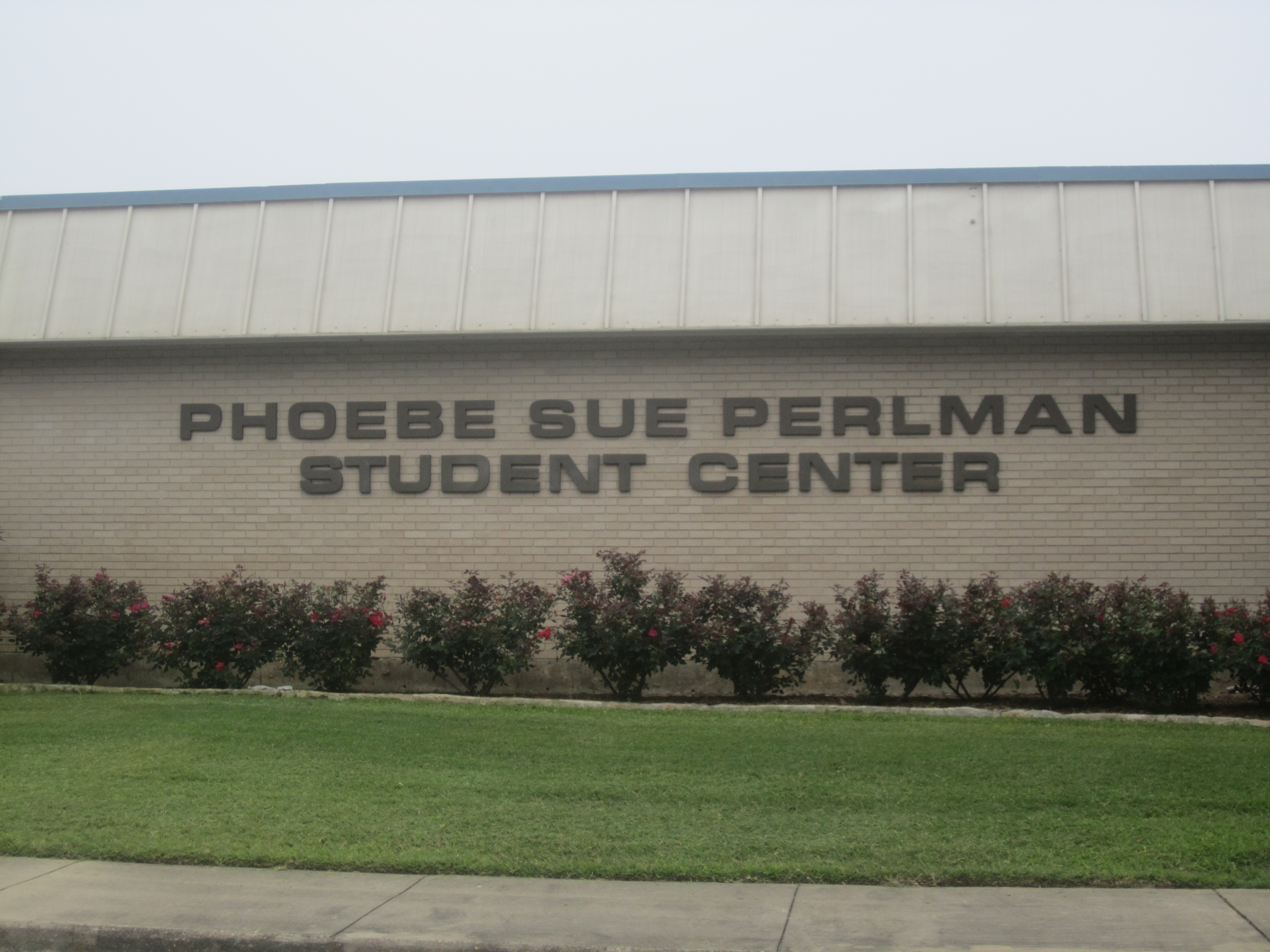
Phoebe Sue Perlman Student Center

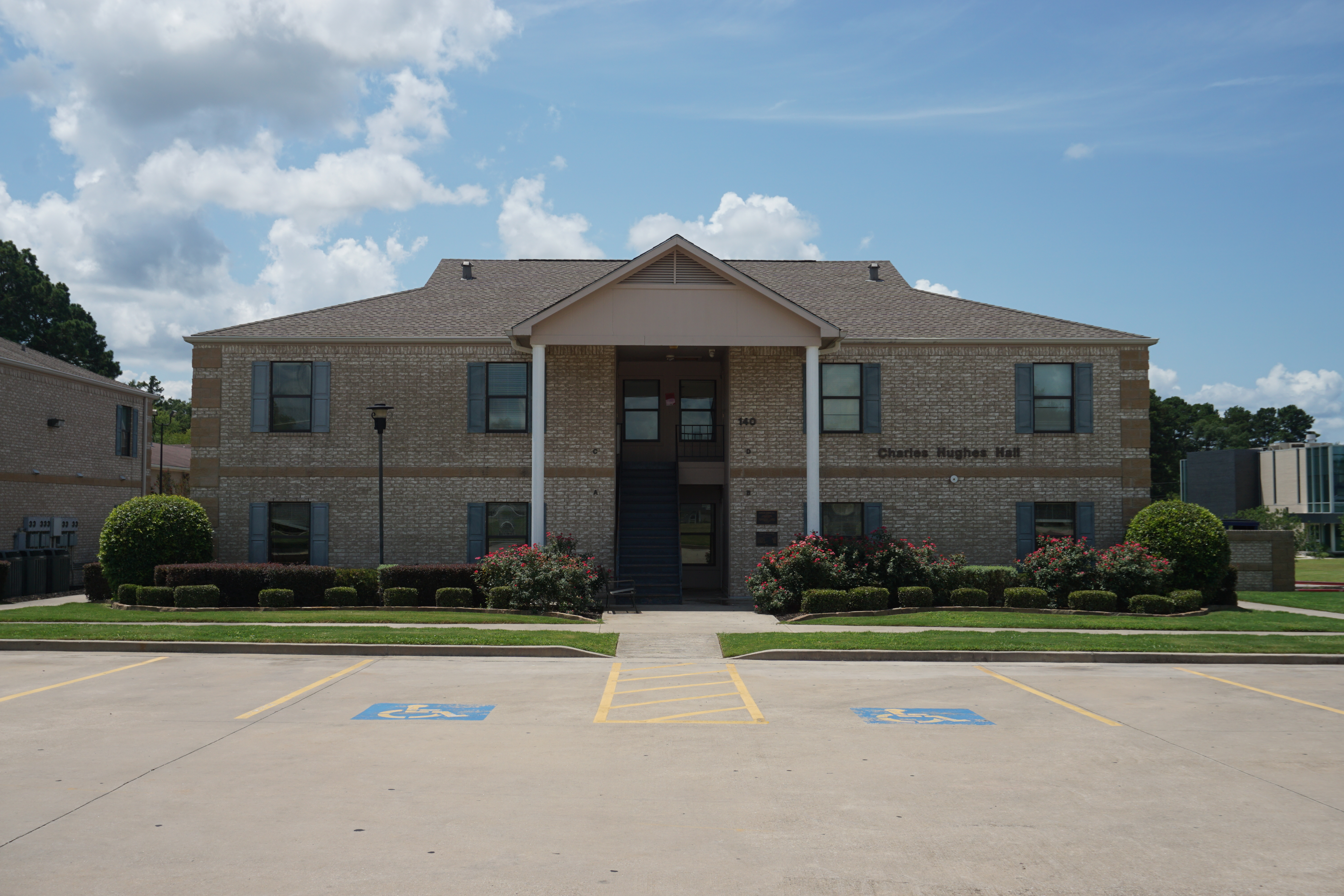
Charles Hughes Hall

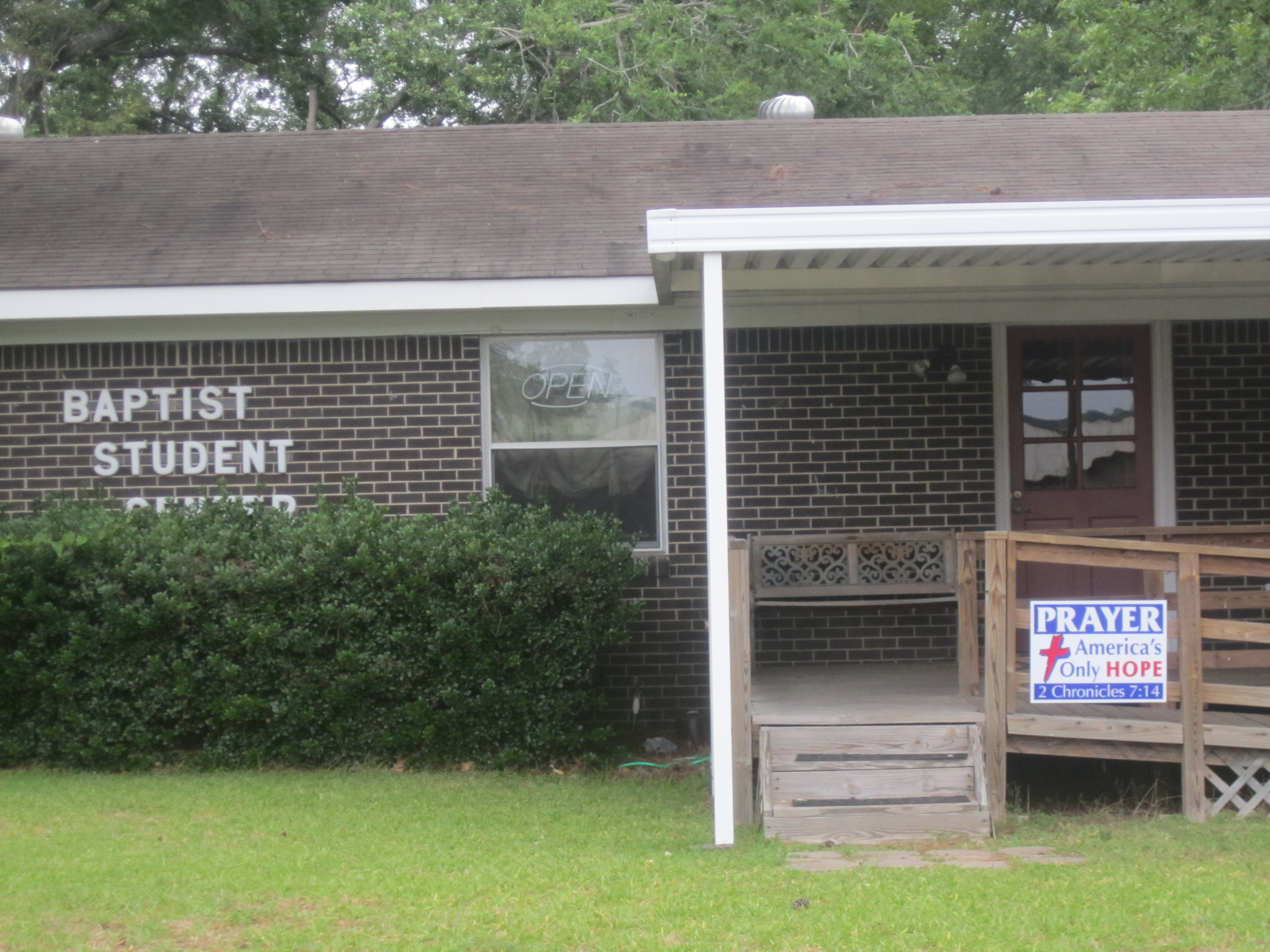
Baptist Student Center

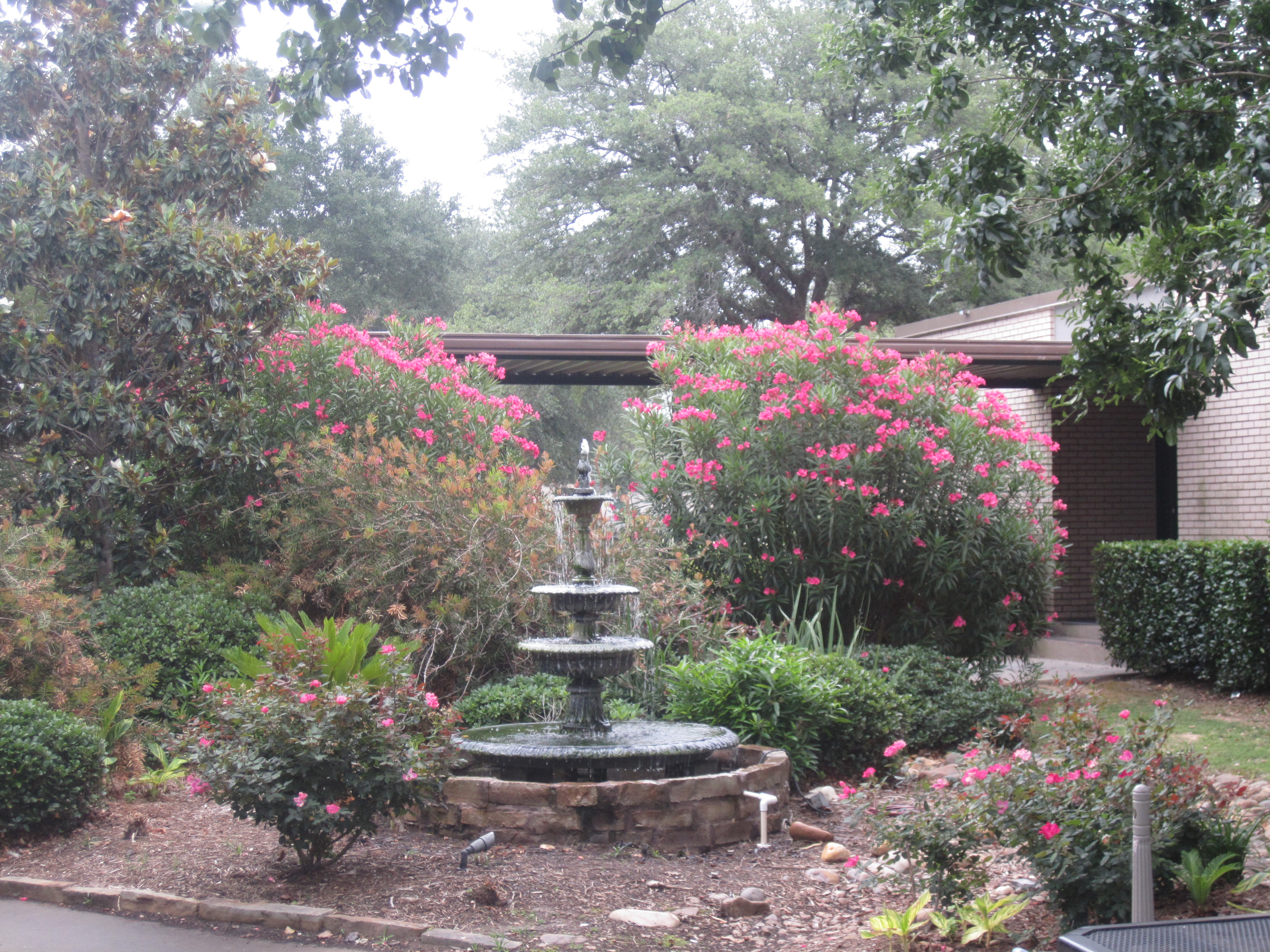
Fountain at Panola College
