= Steve Leven =

Australian basketball player

Personal information
- Born: 15 October 1982 (age 44) Sydney, New South Wales, Australia
- Listed height: 6 ft 5 in (1.96 m)
- Listed weight: 205 lb (93 kg)

Career information
- High school: Laurinburg Institute (Laurinburg, North Carolina)
- College: Auburn (2002–2003); Wyoming (2004–2006)
- NBA draft: 2006: undrafted
- Playing career: 2007–2010
- Position: Shooting guard / small forward

Career history
- 2007: Oberelchingen
- 2008: Newcastle Eagles
- 2009: West-Brabant Giants
- 2009–2010: Tees Valley Mohawks

Steven Leven (born 15 October 1982) is an Australian-British former professional basketball player. He was a shooting guard/small forward.

== Early life ==
Leven was born in Sydney, New South Wales. He was raised by a single mother and grew up in the suburb of Airds. He moved to the United States as a teenager and attended Newport School in Kensington, Maryland, and Laurinburg Institute in Laurinburg, North Carolina.

== College career ==
Leven played college basketball for the Auburn Tigers in 2002–03. He left the program after one season due to Auburn being found guilty of NCAA violations.

In the spring of 2003, Leven transferred to the University of Wyoming. He subsequently sat out the 2003–04 season due to NCAA transfer regulations.

With the Wyoming Cowboys in 2004–05, Leven averaged 8.5 points per game. In the 2005–06 season, he averaged 11.7 points per game.

== Professional career ==
Leven's first professional stint came after signing with the Perth Wildcats of the Australian National Basketball League in 2006. He never debuted for the Wildcats. For the second half of the 2006–07 season, he played for Oberelchingen in the German ProB. In nine games, he averaged 28 points per game.

Leven began the 2007–08 season practicing with Spanish team Unicaja. On 25 January 2008, he joined Icelandic team Snæfell. However, on 1 February 2008, he left Iceland before debuting and joined the Newcastle Eagles of the British Basketball League (BBL). In 17 games, he averaged 16.2 points, 2.0 rebounds, 1.4 assists and 1.1 steals per game.

Leven initially signed with Greek club Kavala/Panorama for the 2008–09 season, but never debuted for them and left due to their financial problems. He later joined Dutch team West-Brabant Giants in March 2009. In 16 games to finish the season, he averaged 7.9 points, 1.2 rebounds and 1.1 assists per game.

In the 2009–10 season, Leven played for the Tees Valley Mohawks of the English Basketball League (EBL). In 15 games, he averaged 23.4 points, 4.4 rebounds, 3.5 assists and 2.3 steals per game.

Leven initially signed with Greek club SEFA Arkadikos for the 2010–11 season, but never debuted for them and left due to their financial problems.

== National team career ==
Leven represented the British national team in 2008 and 2009.

== Software company and accusations of false credentials ==
In 2019, Leven co-founded a Sydney-based software company called Zenbly. The company was placed into administration and liquidated in 2022.

As a result of the turbulent end to his company, Leven's credentials and documents were scrutinised. He was accused of falsifying his PhD, supposedly from Columbia University for applied artificial intelligence. Columbia University reportedly claimed it has no record of Leven's attendance. Leven had also claimed to be a member of a United Nations association for artificial intelligence, to which this also reportedly was not true. He also reportedly claimed to have a bachelor of arts in business administration from the University of Wyoming, along with a bachelor of science in information science from the same institution. However, despite attending the University of Wyoming when he was a basketball player, there is no record of him completing his degree.

== Personal life ==
Leven has joint Australian-Scottish citizenship.
