= Tirame Walker =

American basketball player and coach

Tiran Walker
Career information
- Playing career: 1999–2009

Career history
- 2000–2007: Newcastle Eagles

Tiran Jerome Walker (born September 14, 1975) is an American former professional basketball player, most recently playing for the Cheshire Jets in the British Basketball League, where he was also head coach.

The 6 ft 1in point guard played at Azusa Pacific University, where he was acknowledged nationally as an NAIA All-American in 1998 and 1999. Acclaimed by many as the finest point guard in the league, his exciting style has won him many fans in his six years in the BBL. He is the nephew of the former NBA player James Hardy (Utah Jazz).

Walker signed for the British club Newcastle Eagles in 2000 after a spell with the International Basketball Association team Saskatchewan Hawks from 1999 to 2000. In 2007, after seven years with the Eagles, Walker was appointed as player/coach of the rival Cheshire Jets. However, after just a few months with the Jets, Walker sustained a serious knee injury and returned to the US for surgery. It was announced that in January 2008 that, by mutual consent, he had left the club.

After moving back to America he became the head coach and owner of the ABA's Modesto Bearcats.

Meanwhile, also beginning a career at Project YES, a non-profit youth employment service located in the Stanislaus County. Where he began assisting and guiding youth as both a youth advisor and peer mentor. Shaping, bettering, and directing young adults towards employment and success.
