= Tom Hancock (basketball) =

American basketball player and coach

Tom Hancock (born January 15, 1944, in Chicago, Illinois, U.S.) is an American basketball player and coach. He started coaching college basketball at the University of Maryland in 1978, working for Lefty Driesell. After a year at the University of Evansville, he went to the University of Tennessee at Martin in the Gulf South Conference. Prior to his arrival, Tennessee Martin had lost more games than any other conference school. From the 1982-83 season until 1988, Hancock’s teams won more than any other school in the GSC; won two conference championships, were rated in the top 20 in Division II basketball four times, and went to the NCAA tournament twice. Hancock was voted GSC Coach of the Year in 1982-83 and was named the Best Men’s Basketball Coach in the history of Tennessee Martin by the ESPN Encyclopedia of College Basketball.

== Oldham Celtics ==
In the spring of 1992, Patrick O'Donnell called Coach Hancock and asked him if he was interested in coming to England to coach the Oldham Celtics for the 1992-93 basketball season. The Celtics were going to compete in the British Basketball League (BBL) for the second time in club history. The first time the Celtics played in the BBL - the United Kingdom top league - they only managed to win one game. Hancock was directed to recruit two american players to bring with him. Recruiting in both America and attending european tryout camps for american players, he and Pat O'Donnell found two players who were good enough to make the BBL all-star team in their first year. The Celtics finished the season in the upper half of the league table, and Hancock was chosen to coach the North Team in the BBL All-Star game. At the presentation night end of the year banquet, co-owner Yaro Martynik said, “We have signed some top quality basketball players in the past, but Tom Hancock has proved to be our best ever signing … He has made a tremendous impact…”

== Newcastle Eagles ==
In the spring of 1996, the Newcastle Eagles contacted Coach Hancock with an offer to coach the basketball team for the 1996-87 season in the BBL. The Sunderland/Newcastle club had not qualified for the playoffs the previous five years and were looking for new leadership. It was understood that Hancock would be allowed to make changes in the team roster once the season commenced. The Eagles were under the umbrella of Newcastle United Football under the leadership of Sir John Hall. Coach Hancock became acquainted with Sir John and his family. He was invited to the home of Sir John for dinner with other guests; he sat in Sir John’s private box at James Park for the Liverpool Football match, and he was invited by Sir John to have lunch with the Queen and Duke of Edinburgh at a business man’s lunch. Coach Hancock made two significant changes to the team roster, bringing in two american players who made the All-Star team while playing in the BBL. Hancock was named coach of the month, during the season while leading the Eagles to the BBL playoffs.

== Milton Keynes Lions 1999-2000 ==
In the summer of 1999, Coach Hancock and the ownership of the Milton Keynes Lions reached an agreement for Hancock to coach the Lions for the 1999-2000 season. Milton Keynes had never had success in the BBL as was reported in BRITBALL labeling the Lions as “The worst franchise of the nineties.” Milton Keynes had not reached the playoffs for the previous eight seasons, but Hancock took charge with a roster he felt he could work with, he guided the team throughout the year with a stint back in America tending to family illness. The Lions made the playoffs for the first time in nine years, setting the stage for future success. At the end of the year awards dinner, the owner said, "In some ways, Tom is the best coach I've ever seen."

== Milton Keynes Lions 2006-2007 ==
During the winter of the 2005-2006 BBL season, Coach Hancock received a surprise phone call from the Milton Keynes Management asking him of his availability to return to England and coach the Lions for a second time. Milton Keynes was in the midst of a losing season and was expected to finish outside of the playoffs. Coach Hancock spent the remainder of the basketball season scouting american college basketball players feeling that changes would need to be made to a roster that was losing heavily. He found two excellent players knowing that one all-star caliber player can make a big difference. However, the roster remained the same except for a change at the guard position. In spite of this, and injuries to the two best players, the Lions finished with the best record in the history of the club in the non-divisional playoff league table structure, and made the playoffs. Along the way, Hancock was again chosen Coach of the Month, while guiding his fourth club in British Basketball to the playoffs in four tries, none of which had made it to the playoffs the year before Coach Hancock’s arrival. Coach Hancock left after the season knowing he would not return unless he had full control over player recruitment. At that point in time, he was the last non-playing american to coach full time in the United Kingdom.

== Career history ==
- 2006–07: (United Kingdom) Milton Keynes Lions
- 1999–00: (United Kingdom) Milton Keynes
- 1996–97: (United Kingdom) Newcastle Eagles
- 1992–93: (United Kingdom) Oldham Celtics
- 1981–91: (United States) University of Tennessee at Martin
- 1980–81: (United States) University of Evansville (Assistant)
- 1978–80: (United States) University of Maryland (assistant)
- 1971–78: (United States) York Community High School
- 1968–71: (United States) Goodwin Heights School
- 1967–68: (United States) Ball State University (assistant)
