= Paul Blake (basketball) =

British basketball officer

Paul Blake was the chairman of the now defunct British Basketball League, succeeding Vince Macaulay-Razaq in 2005, as well as working as the current managing director of the Newcastle Eagles basketball franchise.

He attended Northumbria University in Newcastle upon Tyne.
