= Andrew Bridge (basketball) =

British professional basketball player

Personal information
- Born: 5 October 1979 (age 47) Chesterfield, Derbyshire, England
- Listed height: 1.93 m (6 ft 4 in)
- Listed weight: 86.36 kg (190 lb)

Career information
- Playing career: 1999–2013
- Position: Shooting guard

Career history
- 1999–2000: Mansfield Express
- 2000–2002: Sheffield Sharks
- 2002–2012: Newcastle Eagles
- 2012–2013: Sheffield Sharks
Medals
Men's basketball
Representing England
Commonwealth Games
Bronze medal – third place	2006 Melbourne	Team

Andrew Bridge (born 5 October 1979) is a British professional basketball player. Bridge is a 6 ft 4 in shooting guard. Bridge is the current captain of Newcastle Eagles.

== Biography ==
The 6 ft 3in shooting guard started his career with Mansfield Express in 1999 in the English Basketball League, before stepping up to Professional Basketball with the Sheffield Sharks in 2000. In 2002, the England and Great Britain International moved further North to play for the Newcastle Eagles.

Andrew was part of the Bronze Medal-winning England Basketball Team at the 2006 Commonwealth Games in Melbourne, Australia and completed a successful season with the Newcastle Eagles "clean sweep" of Championships in 2006.

"A shooting guard, he can also handle the ball competently and is best known for his solid defence and smart basketball brain. A real all-rounder and rapidly becoming the glue that helps hold the team together".

As of 27 March 2011 the official British Basketball League website shows Bridge has played 324 games, with averages of 7.47 Points Per Game, 2.97 Rebounds Per Game and 0.97 Assists Per Game.
