= Brixton TopCats =

- Leagues: Men's: EBL Division 2 Women's: Women's British Basketball League
- Founded: 1985
- History: Brixton TopCats (1985–1986); Lambeth TopCats (1986–1987); Brixton TopCats (1987–present)
- Arena: Brixton Recreation Centre
- Location: Brixton, London
- Team colors: Red and White
- Website: brixtontopcats.org
Home	Away

Brixton TopCats is a British basketball club based in the Brixton area of London. Established in 1985, the Men's first team currently compete in the National Basketball League Division 2, and the Women's team compete in the Women's British Basketball League. The club is particularly notable for its development programme, which has started the careers of Luol Deng, Ajou Deng and Ugonna Onyekwe in recent years. The TopCats are based at Brixton Recreation Centre and since 2009 have operated a partnership with London South Bank University.

The club has received visits over the years from Prince Charles, Princess Diana, Michael Jordan, Allen Iverson, Robert Horry, Lennox Lewis, Ian Wright and Kate Hoey MP. The club's founder, owner and General Manager, Jimmy Rogers, who died in 2018, was recognised as a community leader and remembered globally in basketball communities.

== Season-by-season records ==
Season	Division	Played	Won	Lost	Points	League	Playoffs	National Cup	National Trophy	Patron's Cup	National Shield
Brixton TopCats
1985-86	NBL Division 2	22	15	7	30	4th		1st Round	Semi-final	DNQ	DNQ
Lambeth TopCats
1986-87	NBL Division 2	18	11	7	22	5th		2nd Round	Quarter-final	DNQ	DNQ
Brixton TopCats
1987-88	NBL Division 2	18	14	4	28	2nd	Runner-up	1st Round	Runner-up	DNQ	DNQ
1988-89	NBL Division 1	20	17	3	34	2nd	Semi-final	1st Round	Winners	DNQ	DNQ
1989-90	NBL Division 1	22	19	3	38	3rd	Runner-up	2nd Round	Runner-up	DNQ	DNQ
1990-91	NBL Division 1	22	10	12	20	9th	DNQ	2nd Round	2nd Round	DNQ	DNQ
1991-92	NBL Division 1	22	13	9	26	4th	Semi-final	2nd Round	Semi-final	DNQ	DNQ
1992-93	NBL Division 1	22	11	11	22	7th	Semi-final	2nd Round	Quarter-final	DNQ	DNQ
1993-94	NBL Division 1	18	10	8	20	5th	Quarter-final	3rd Round	Quarter-final	DNQ	DNQ
1994-95	NBL Division 1	22	13	9	26	5th	Quarter-final	2nd Round	Quarter-final	DNQ	DNQ
1995-96	NBL Division 1	22	9	13	18	7th	Runner-up	1st Round	Quarter-final	DNQ	DNQ
1996-97	NBL Division 1	26	7	19	14	12th	DNQ		2nd Round	DNQ	DNQ
1997-98	NBL Division 1	22	4	18	8	12th	DNQ		2nd Round	DNQ	DNQ
1998-99	NBL Division 1	26	2	24	4	14th	DNQ		3rd Round	DNQ	DNQ
1999-2000	NBL Division 2	24	17	7	34	4th			2nd Round	DNQ	DNQ
2000-01	NBL Division 2	24	6	18	12	11th	DNQ		DNQ	DNQ	Quarter-final
2001-02	NBL Division 2 South	16	7	9	14	6th	DNQ		DNQ	DNQ	2nd Round
2002-03	NBL Division 2 South	14	7	7	14	6th	DNQ		DNQ	DNQ	Runner-up
2003-04	EBL Division 3 South	18	16	2	32	1st	Semi-final		DNQ	DNQ	Winners
2004-05	EBL Division 3 East	18	9	9	18	7th	DNQ	2nd Round	DNQ	DNQ	Runner-up
2005-06	EBL Division 3 South-East	16	6	10	12	7th	DNQ	1st Round	DNQ	DNQ	1st Round
2006-07	EBL Division 3 South	16	11	5	22	3rd	Quarter-final	2nd Round	DNQ	DNQ	3rd Round
2007-08	EBL Division 3 South	22	7	15	14	11th	DNQ	1st Round	DNQ	DNQ	2nd Round
2008-09	EBL Division 3 South	24	20	4	40	1st	Runner-up	Semi-final	DNQ	DNQ	Winners
2009-10	EBL Division 2	20	15	5	30	2nd	Quarter-final	Quarter-final	DNQ	1st Round	DNQ
2010-11	EBL Division 1	18	8	10	16	5th	Quarter-final	Winners	1st Round	DNQ	DNQ
2011-12	EBL Division 1	24	11	13	22	9th	DNQ	3rd Round	Quarter-final	DNQ	DNQ
2012-13	EBL Division 1	26	3	23	6	14th	DNQ	2nd Round	1st Round	DNQ	DNQ
2013-14	EBL Division 2	20	12	8	24	4th	Semi-final	2nd Round	DNQ	1st Round	DNQ
2014-15	EBL Division 2	22	10	12	20	7th	Quarter-final	2nd Round	DNQ	1st Round	DNQ
