= Newcastle Eagles =

British professional basketball team

- Leagues: SLB (Men); SLB (Women)
- Established: Men: 1976; Women: 2018
- History: List: EPAB Sunderland 1976–1977 Sunderland Sunblest 1977–1980 Sunderland Saints 1980–1983 Austin Rover Sunderland 1983–1984 Sunderland Maestros 1984–1985 Sunderland 1985–1986 Sunderland 76ers 1986–1990 Sunderland Saints 1990–1993 Sunderland Scorpions 1993–1995 Newcastle Comets 1995–1996; Newcastle Eagles; 1996–present
- Arena: Vertu Motors Arena
- Capacity: 2,800
- Location: Newcastle upon Tyne
- Team colours: Black, white, gold
- Main sponsor: Men: Newcastle College University Centre; Women: Lumo
- Head coach: Men: Marc Steutel; Women: Chloe Gaynor
- Ownership: Paul Blake, Ken Nottage
- Championships: 1 SLB Trophy; 7 BBL Championship; 7 BBL Playoffs; 6 BBL Cup; 7 BBL Trophy; 1 English National Cup; 2 NBL Playoffs
- Website: newcastle-eagles.com
Home	Away

The Newcastle Eagles are a professional basketball club based in Newcastle upon Tyne, England. The senior men's and women's teams play in Super League Basketball, the top-tier professional basketball league in Britain for men and women, and the men's team have previously played in the European North Basketball League. The club also operates an academy program for young players. They are the most successful club in the history of British men's professional basketball, with 28 British professional titles and 3 English titles as of September 2026.

The team was originally founded as EPAB Sunderland, based at the Northumbria Centre in Washington, and began competing in the Second Division of the English National Basketball League in 1976. In 1987, Sunderland became a founding member of the breakaway British Basketball League with other top-flight English and Scottish clubs. They remained in Sunderland until 1995, when they moved to Newcastle and renamed to the Newcastle Comets, before becoming the Eagles in 1996. Their first Newcastle home was the Newcastle Arena, followed by Northumbria University's Sport Central in 2010. The Eagles moved into their own purpose-built arena, the Eagles Community Arena (known as the Vertu Arena for sponsorship purposes), in January 2019 when they hosted the Plymouth Raiders. Their traditional arch rivals are the Caledonia Gladiators, however in recent years a fierce rivalry with the Leicester Riders has also developed.

== Team history ==
=== Early years and move to Tyneside ===
The club's roots can be traced back to the founding of EPAB Sunderland in 1976. The club played in Washington at the Northumbria Centre under various monikers throughout the 1980s and early 1990s, managing a second place league finish in 1983, as well as two play-off victories at Wembley in 1981 & '83. In 1995, the owner Dave Elderkin moved the club to Newcastle, to be known as the Newcastle Comets. Soon afterwards the club was bought by Sir John Hall, then the chairman of Newcastle United, adding them to his Newcastle Sporting Group of the city's football, ice hockey and rugby teams. Hall's Sporting Club group was considered by most observers to be a relative failure and upon its dissolution, Ken Nottage and Paul Blake became the Eagles' new owners. The final name change, from the Comets to the Eagles, took place in 1996. Performances remained consistent with the club achieving regular top five league placings from 1998 onwards.

=== The "Clean sweep" of 2005–06 ===
The 2005–06 season proved to be the most successful in their history so far when, under the guidance of player/coach Fabulous Flournoy, the club achieved a "clean sweep" of trophies, including the BBL Cup, BBL Trophy and Championship "double".

In addition, Flournoy picked up the BBL Coach of the Year and former Villanova Wildcat, Andrew Sullivan, was voted BBL Player of the Year. Flournoy, Sullivan and Andrew Bridge were also members of the bronze medal winning England team in the 2006 Commonwealth Games during March 2006.

=== Recent times ===
At the start of the 2007–08 season it was announced that Nike and Northern Rock were to sponsor the Eagles, bringing in more money to the club. Also, the signing of Richard Midgley gave great hope that the eagles could challenge Guildford Heat to regain the BBL League title. However, after a bust up with player/coach, Fab Flournoy he soon left to join the Everton Tigers. This meant there was no point guard and this led to the signing of Bryan Defares who could not settle in England and he too left. Finally, at the third attempt, Steve Leven (former NBA prospect) was signed despite his bad boy reputation. After defeat in the BBL Cup, then later defeat in the BBL Trophy Final the Eagles were in danger of having a poor season. Fortunately, after a miraculous overtime win against Guildford Heat, they won the BBL League Title.

At the start of the 2008–09 season they were strengthened by the signing of Trey Moore from Cheshire Jets. After an indifferent start, they embarked on a 17 match winning run to become the first team for nearly two decades to retain the BBL title, finishing 8 points ahead of Everton Tigers. They also reached the semi-finals of the BBL Cup, losing narrowly to Everton Tigers on aggregate before gaining revenge by beating them home and away in the BBL Trophy semi-final. The Eagles beat Guildford Heat at The Spectrum in the Final. In the play-offs they narrowly avoided an upset after seeing off Cheshire Jets 88–83 before beating Plymouth Raiders to form a match against Everton Tigers once again. Despite 30 points from ex-Eagles Richard Midgley, the Eagles held on for a 97–94 win, therefore winning the treble to cap off their most successful season since the clean sweep.

In the 2009–10 season the Eagles again retained the BBL title, finishing 2 points ahead of Sheffield Sharks. The league title actually came down to the last game of the season with Sheffield Sharks losing their last game of the season 97–95 to Worthing Thunder thanks to Evaldas Zabas' basket 4 seconds from the end. This completed the double for the Eagles who had won the BBL Trophy by beating 111–95 in the Final at The Spectrum. In the BBL Cup Eagles lost 64–61 in the quarter-finals to Cheshire Jets and in the play-offs Everton Tigers beat the Eagles 190–158 on aggregate in the two legged semi-final.

At the start of the 2010–2011 season it was announced that the Esh Group, along with partners Northumbria University and Northumbrian Water would be the new main sponsors of the Eagles. In the BBL Cup the Eagles were beaten 204–182 on aggregate by the Mersey Tigers in the semi-finals. Eagles had won the first leg at home 97–90 but lost the second leg away 114–85. It was the Mersey Tigers who would beat the Eagles in the semi-finals of the BBL Trophy also. After a rare first leg draw (82–82) away from home, the Eagles went down 77–74 at home.

=== Modern era ===
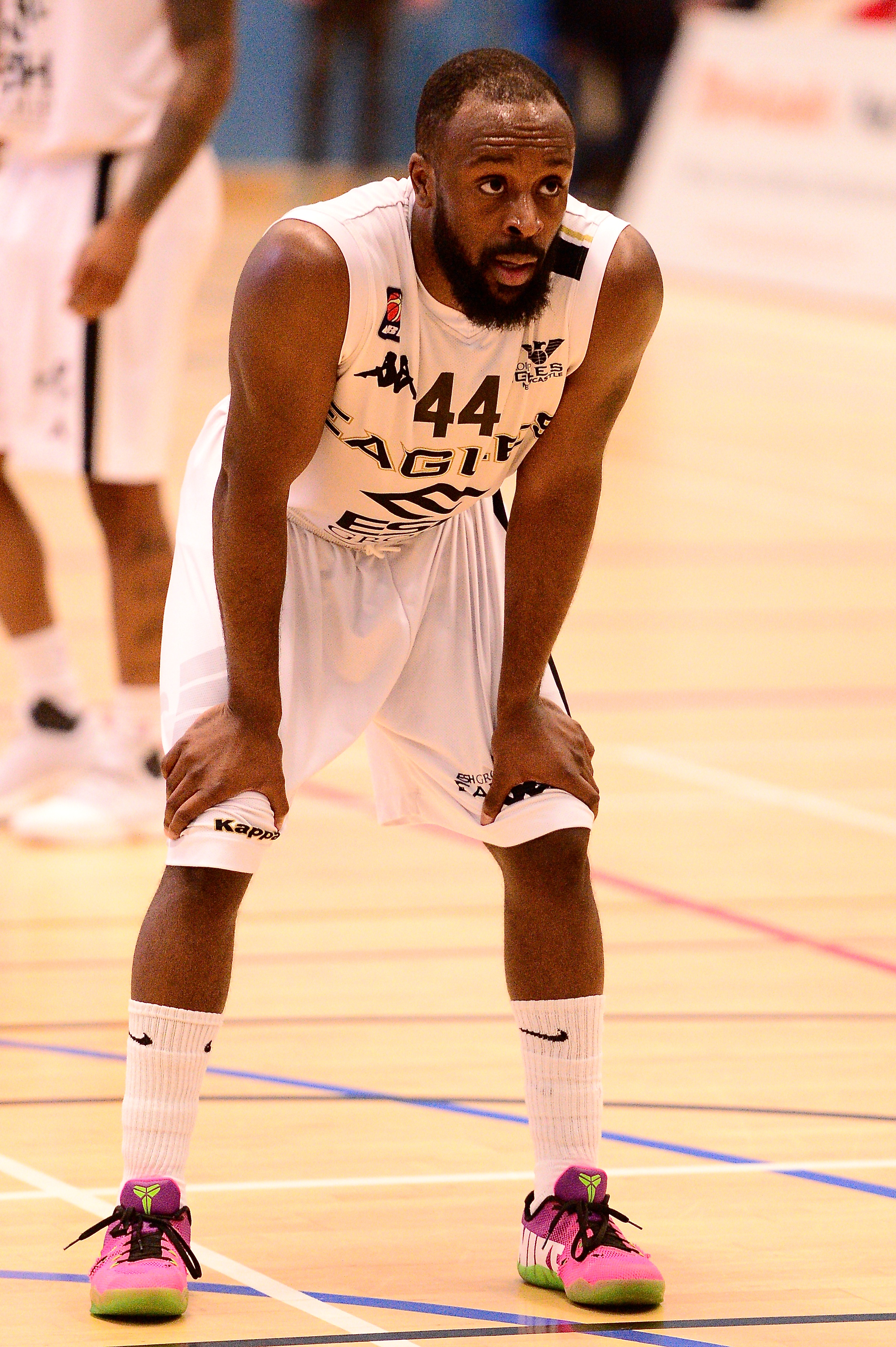
Rahmon Fletcher was one of Eagles' star players, with three won BBL Cup MVPs.

The club repeated the feat of 2005–06 by winning all of the trophies on offer in a season for a second time 2011–12. The previous season was the first time since 2003–04 that they had failed to win a trophy. They lost 7 league games, 3 less than in 2005–06, although this time around they were only required to play 30 games, 10 less than in 2005–06. They clinched the clean sweep with a victory over Leicester in the play-off final on 12 May. A hat-trick of sweeps was completed in the 2014–15 season.

=== Eagles Community Arena ===
In January 2019, the Eagles moved into their own purpose-built arena on the Scotswood Road. Success did not follow them there at first, as they crashed out of the BBL Trophy, Cup and Playoffs without reaching any finals, and finished 3rd in the BBL for the second consecutive season.

On the night of their first preseason game ahead of the 2019-20 British Basketball League season, the club was rocked by the announcement that head coach Fabulous Flournoy would leave the club after 17 years. Flournoy joined the Toronto Raptors, the then-defending NBA champions, as an assistant coach, reuniting with his friend and mentor Nick Nurse, who gave him his first professional contract with the Birmingham Bullets in 1996. Assistant coach Ian MacLeod was announced as his interim replacement as head coach. In a season cut short by the COVID-19 pandemic, MacLeod was able to lead the Eagles to the 2020 BBL Trophy title, defeating NBL side Solent Kestrels, which had made an historic run as an invited team from the English NBL by beating established BBL clubs London Lions and Bristol Flyers, as well as fellow NBL side Worthing Thunder.

In the following 2020-21 season, further success followed as the club defeated London in two tense finals to capture the BBL Cup and Playoffs titles, recording their 6th and 7th titles in those competitions respectively, the most for any BBL club. The following season, however, saw the Eagles slump to 9th in the regular season and miss out on postseason basketball for the first time since 2000.

The 2022-23 season saw Great Britain coach Marc Steutel replace MacLeod as head coach. The team continued to struggle in all competitions, but returned to the Playoffs. Results improved in the following 2023-24 season, as the team avoided a third straight losing season, recorded a 6th place finish in the league, and advanced to the semi-finals in the Playoffs, where they lost to a dominant London Lions side which included former NBA players Sam Dekker and David Nwaba. Newcastle also fulfilled a dream long held by owner Paul Blake by making their first foray into European basketball since the club moved to the city, entering the European North Basketball League for the first time. A strong debut campaign followed, as the Eagles finished 3rd in their group and advanced to the playoffs, where they narrowly lost in a two-legged tie to eventual champions Bakken Bears of Denmark. Eagles guard Rickey McGill was named MVP for the 2023-24 ENBL season.

In the off-season following the 2023-24 BBL season, the league's operating company was stripped of its licence to organise the league by governing body British Basketball due to financial concerns. A consortium of the participating clubs was issued a 3-year interim licence to organise a new league, which was christened Super League Basketball, and replaced the BBL as the premier professional league in Britain. In the first season of the SLB era, the Eagles secured their first silverware under Marc Steutel by winning the SLB Trophy in dominant fashion over Bristol Flyers. With this victory, team stalwart and captain Darius Defoe won his record-extending 28th British title.

== Women's team history ==
After the 2017-18 Women's British Basketball League season, Northumbria University decided that they were going to focus on BUCS competitions going forward, which meant that their successful Team Northumbria WBBL team would be shut down. The Newcastle Eagles and the university came to an agreement where the Eagles would take over the Team Northumbria WBBL side and keep a top-flight women's team in the North East. In Newcastle Eagles colours, the women's team have been competitive, reaching the Playoffs final twice and the Cup final once, although a first major trophy as Eagles continues to elude them.

The first Eagles women's head coach was Chris Bunten, who moved across to the Eagles from Team Northumbria after previously leading the university side to the WBBL Playoffs title in 2016. Several players moved across with him, including new captain Giulia Simioni and team regular Rachael Bland. The team's first season in Eagles colours yielded a 7th-place finish in the league and early exits from other competitions. The 2019-20 season, which was cut short due to the ongoing COVID-19 pandemic, saw some improvement, as the Eagles reached the semi-final of the WBBL Cup. In the 2020-21 season, despite another 7th-place finish in the league, the Eagles reached the final of the WBBL Playoff, after defeating the 2nd-placed Leicester Riders 79-73 in the quarter-final and league champions Sevenoaks Suns 79-72 in the semi-final. An historic title for the underdogs was not to be, however, as the Eagles fell 93-71 to London Lions in the final.

== Home venues ==
- 1976–1978 - Northumbria Centre, Washington
- 1978–1991 - Crowtree Leisure Centre, Sunderland
- 1991–1995 - Northumbria Centre, Washington
- 1995–2010 - Metro Radio Arena, Newcastle upon Tyne
- 2010–2018 - Sport Central, Newcastle upon Tyne
- 2019–present - Vertu Motors Arena, Newcastle upon Tyne

== Season-by-season records ==
=== Men ===
Seasons 1976–1996
Season	Division	Tier	Regular Season						Post-Season	Trophy	Cup	Head coach
Season	Division	Tier	Finish	Played	Wins	Losses	Points	Win %	Post-Season	Trophy	Cup	Head coach
EPAB Sunderland
1976–1977	NBL2	II	4th	20	13	7	26	0.650	N/A	N/A	(NC)	
1977–1978	NBL2	II	1st	20	20	0	40	1.000	N/A	N/A	(NC)	
Sunderland Sunblest
1978–1979	NBL	I	7th	20	7	13	14	0.350	Did not qualify	N/A	(NC)	
1979–1980	NBL	I	6th	18	9	9	18	0.500	Did not qualify	N/A	(NC)	
Sunderland Saints
1980–1981	NBL	I	4th	18	11	7	22	0.611	Winners, beating Crystal Palace, 96-92	N/A	Semi-final (NC)	
1981–1982	NBL	I	3rd	22	16	6	32	0.727	Runners-up, losing to Crystal Palace, 86-111	N/A	Quarter-final (NC)	
Sunderland Saints/Maestros
1982–1983	NBL	I	2nd	24	18	6	36	0.750	Winners, beating Crystal Palace, 75-74	N/A	Quarter-final (NC)	
Austin Rover Sunderland
1983–1984	NBL	I	5th	36	23	13	46	0.638	Did not qualify	N/A	Semi-final (NC)	
Sunderland Maestros
1984–1985	NBL	I	9th	26	12	14	24	0.461	Did not qualify	N/A	1st round (NC)	
Sunderland
1985–1986	NBL	I	13th	28	8	20	16	0.285	Did not qualify	N/A	Quarter-final (NC)	
Sunderland 76ers
1986–1987	NBL	I	10th	24	7	17	14	0.291	Did not qualify	N/A	2nd round (NC)	
1987–1988	BBL	I	12th	28	8	20	16	0.286	Did not qualify	1st round (LT)	Quarter-final (NC)	Dave Elderkin
1988–1989	BBL	I	6th	20	12	8	24	0.600	Quarter-final	1st round (LT)	1st round (NC)	Craig Lynch
1989–1990	BBL	I	3rd	28	20	8	40	0.714	Runners-up, losing to Kingston, 82-87	Semi-final (LT)	Runners-up (NC)	Craig Lynch
Sunderland Saints
1990–1991	BBL	I	2nd	24	18	6	36	0.750	Runners-up	1st round (LT)	Winners, beating Leicester, 88–81	Craig Lynch; Dave Elderkin
1991–1992	BBL	I	10th	30	3	27	6	0.100	Did not qualify	1st round (LT)	3rd round (NC)	Dave Elderkin
1992–1993	BBL	I	11th	33	6	27	12	0.181	Did not qualify	1st round (LT)	3rd round (NC)	Dave Elderkin
Sunderland Scorpions
1993–1994	BBL	I	10th	36	13	23	26	0.361	Did not qualify	1st round (LT)	Quarter-final (NC)	Dave Elderkin
1994–1995	BBL	I	13th	36	4	32	8	0.111	Did not qualify	1st round (LT)	4th round (NC)	Dave Elderkin
Newcastle Comets
1995–1996	BBL	I	10th	36	11	25	22	0.440	Did not qualify	Quarter-final (LT)	4th round (NC)	Tom Hancock

Seasons 1996–2024
Season	Division	Regular Season						Post-Season	Trophy	Cup	Head coach
Season	Division	Finish	Played	Wins	Losses	Points	Win %	Post-Season	Trophy	Cup	Head coach
Newcastle Eagles
1996–97	BBL	7th	36	21	15	42	0.583	Quarter-final	1st round (LT)	Semi-final (NC)	Tom Hancock
1997–98	BBL	3rd	36	25	11	50	0.694	Quarter-final	Semi-final (LT)	4th round (NC)	Craig Lynch
1998–99	BBL	5th	36	21	15	42	0.583	Quarter-final	Quarter-final (LT)	Semi-final (NC)	Craig Lynch
1999–00	BBL N	6th	36	10	26	20	0.277	Did not qualify	Quarter-final (LT)	1st round (NC)	Craig Lynch
2000–01	BBL N	3rd	36	20	16	40	0.555	1st round	Runners-up (LT)	Quarter-final (NC)	Tony Garbelotto
2001–02	BBL N	3rd	32	17	15	34	0.531	Quarter-final	Quarter-final (BT)	Quarter-final (NC)	Tony Garbelotto
2002–03	BBL	5th	40	25	15	50	0.625	Semi-final	Semi-final (BT)	Quarter-final (NC)	Fab Flournoy
2003–04	BBL	6th	36	18	18	36	0.500	Quarter-final	1st round (BT)	Quarter-final (BC)	Fab Flournoy
2004–05	BBL	2nd	40	31	9	62	0.775	Winners, beating Chester, 78–75	Winners, beating Brighton, 85–60	Quarter-final (BC)	Fab Flournoy
2005–06	BBL	1st	40	30	10	60	0.750	Winners, beating Scottish, 83–68	Winners, beating Leicester, 71–50	Winners, beating London, 83–69	Fab Flournoy
2006–07	BBL	3rd	36	25	11	50	0.694	Winners, beating Scottish, 95–82	Runners-up (BT)	Semi-final (BC)	Fab Flournoy
2007–08	BBL	1st	33	29	4	58	0.878	Semi-final	Runners-up (BT)	Runners-up (BC)	Fab Flournoy
2008–09	BBL	1st	33	28	5	56	0.848	Winners, beating Everton, 87–84	Winners, beating Guildford, 83–71	Semi-final (BC)	Fab Flournoy
2009–10	BBL	1st	36	31	5	62	0.861	Semi-final	Winners, beating Cheshire, 115–95	Quarter-final (BC)	Fab Flournoy
2010–11	BBL	2nd	33	24	9	48	0.727	Semi-final	Semi-final (BT)	Semi-final (BC)	Fab Flournoy
2011–12	BBL	1st	30	23	7	46	0.733	Winners, beating Leicester, 71–62	Winners, beating Plymouth, 184–177 agg.	Winners, beating Plymouth, 115–94	Fab Flournoy
2012–13	BBL	2nd	33	25	8	50	0.758	Runners-up	Quarter-final (BT)	Runners-up (BC)	Fab Flournoy
2013–14	BBL	1st	33	28	5	56	0.848	Runners-up	Quarter-final (BT)	Runners-up (BC)	Fab Flournoy
2014–15	BBL	1st	36	31	5	62	0.861	Winners, beating London, 96–84	Winners, beating Leicester, 96–90	Winners, beating Glasgow, 84–71	Fab Flournoy
2015–16	BBL	2nd	33	28	5	56	0.848	Quarter-final	Runners-up (BT)	Winners, beating Leicester, 94–82	Fab Flournoy
2016–17	BBL	2nd	33	23	10	46	0.697	Runners-up	Quarter-final (BT)	Winners, beating Glasgow, 91–83	Fab Flournoy
2017–18	BBL	3rd	33	22	11	44	0.667	Quarter-final	Quarter-final (BT)	Quarter-final (BC)	Fab Flournoy
2018–19	BBL	3rd	33	21	12	42	0.636	Quarter-final	Quarter-final (BT)	Semi-final (BC)	Fab Flournoy
2019–20	BBL	Regular season cancelled due to COVID-19 pandemic						-	Winners, beating Solent, 96–94 OT	Quarter-final (BC)	Ian MacLeod
2020–21	BBL	4th	30	18	12	36	0.600	Winners, beating London, 68–66	Quarter-final (BT)	Winners, beating London, 84-77	Ian MacLeod
2021–22	BBL	9th	27	10	17	20	0.370	Did not qualify	1st round (BT)	Group stage (BC)	Ian MacLeod
2022–23	BBL	8th	36	11	25	22	0.305	Quarter-final	1st round (BT)	Quarter-final (BC)	Marc Steutel
2023–24	BBL	6th	36	18	18	36	0.500	Semi-final	1st round (BT)	-	Marc Steutel

=== SLB season-by-season ===
Champions	SLB champions	Runners-up	Playoff berth

Season	Tier	League	Regular season					Postseason	Cup	Trophy	Head Coach
Season	Tier	League	Finish	Played	Wins	Losses	Win %	Postseason	Cup	Trophy	Head Coach
Newcastle Eagles
2024–25	1	SLB	5th	32	14	18	.438	Runners-up	First round	Champions	Marc Steutel
2025–26	1	SLB	8th	32	12	20	.375	Quarterfinals	Quarterfinals	Runners-up	Marc Steutel
Championship record				64	26	38	.406	0 championships			
Playoff record				7	3	4	.429	0 playoff championships			

=== Women ===
Season	Division	Tier	Regular Season						Post-Season	Trophy	Cup	Head coach
Season	Division	Tier	Position	Played	Wins	Losses	Points	Win %	Post-Season	Trophy	Cup	Head coach
2018–19	WBBL	I	7th	22	10	12	20	0.455	Quarter-final	Group stage	Quarter-final	Chris Bunten
2019–20	WBBL	I	Regular season cancelled due to COVID-19 pandemic						-	Group stage	Semi-final	Chris Bunten
2020–21	WBBL	I	7th	20	7	13	14	0.350	Runners-up	Quarter-final	Group stage	Chris Bunten
2021–22	WBBL	I	10th	24	7	17	20	0.292	Did not qualify	1st round	Runners-up	Chris Bunten/Noelia Cacheiro
2022–23	WBBL	I	8th	22	9	13	18	0.409	Quarter-final	Semi-final	1st round	Matt Newby
2023–24	WBBL	I	6th	20	9	11	18	0.450	Runners-up	1st round	-	Matt Newby
2024–25	SLB	I	3rd	20	15	5	30	0.750	Semi-final	Group stage	Semi-final	Matt Newby/Chloe Gaynor
2025–26	SLB	I	5th	18	11	7	22	0.611	Quarter-final	Group stage	Quarter-final	Chloe Gaynor

*- Season in progress

== European record ==
=== European North Basketball League ===
Season	Group stage							Playoffs
Season	Group	Position	Played	Won	Lost	Points +/-	Points	Playoffs
2023–24	A	3rd	7	5	2	+34	12	Quarter-final
2024–25	A	1st	8	7	1	+71	15	Runners-up
2025–26	3	18th	8	3	5	+8	11	DNQ

*- Season in progress

== Club statistics records ==
Accurate as of 7 October 2014 (Includes BBL Championship games only)

- 3 pts scored – Russ Saunders 716
- Assists – Fabulous Flournoy – 1,528
- Blocked shots – Fabulous Flournoy – 320
- Defensive rebounds – Fabulous Flournoy – 1,497
- Field Goals scored – Charles Smith – 1,621
- Free Throws scored – Charles Smith – 761
- Games Played – Fabulous Flournoy – 393
- Offensive Rebounds – Darius Defoe – 894
- Personal Fouls – Fabulous Flournoy – 1,075
- Points – Charles Smith – 5,897
- Steals – Fabulous Flournoy – 605
- Total Rebounds – Fabulous Flournoy – 2,139
- Turnovers – Fabulous Flournoy – 910

== Honours ==
=== League ===
- BBL Championship
  - Winners: 7 (2005–06, 2007–08, 2008–09, 2009–10, 2011–12, 2013–14, 2014–15)
  - Runners-up: 6 (1990–91, 2004–05, 2010–11, 2012–13, 2015–16, 2016–17)
- NBL First Division
  - Runners-up: 1 (1982–83)
- NBL Second Division
  - Winners: 1 (1977–78)

=== Playoffs ===
- BBL Playoffs
  - Winners: 7 (2004–05, 2005–06, 2006–07, 2008–09, 2011–12, 2014–15, 2020–21)
  - Runners-up: 5 (1989–90, 1990–91, 2012–13, 2013–14, 2016–17)
- SLB Playoffs
  - Runners-up: 1 (2024–25)
- WBBL Playoffs
  - Runners-up: 2 (2020–21, 2023–24)
- NBL Playoffs
  - Winners: 2 (1980–81, 1982–83)
  - Runners-up: 1 (1981–82)

=== Trophy ===
- SLB Trophy
  - Winners: 1 (2024–25)
  - Runners-up: 1 (2025–26)
- BBL Trophy
  - Winners: 7 (2004–05, 2005–06, 2008–09, 2009–10, 2011–12, 2014–15, 2019-20)
  - Runners-up: 4 (2000–01, 2006–07, 2007–08, 2015–16)

=== Cup ===
- BBL Cup
  - Winners: 6 (2005–06, 2011–12, 2014–15, 2015–16, 2016–17, 2020–21)
  - Runners-up: 3 (2007–08, 2012–13, 2013–14)
- WBBL Cup
  - Runners-up: 1 (2021–22)
- English National Cup
  - Winners: 1 (1990–91)
  - Runners-up: 1 (1989–90)

=== European competitions ===
- European North Basketball League
  - Runners-up: 1 (2024–25)

== Players ==
=== Men's team roster ===
Note: Flags indicate national team eligibility at FIBA-sanctioned events. Players may hold other non-FIBA nationalities not displayed.

Newcastle Eagles roster
Players
Coaches

Pos.	No.	Nat.	Name	Ht.
F	1	(United States)	Christon, Cameron	6 ft 6 in (1.98 m)
G/F	2	(United Kingdom)	Ward-Hibbert, Joshua (C)	6 ft 5 in (1.96 m)
F	3	(United States)	Barnes, Trevond	6 ft 9 in (2.06 m)
G	6	(Canada)	Tchoukuiegno, Blondeau	6 ft 2 in (1.88 m)
F	7	(United Kingdom)	Carey, Kyle	6 ft 6 in (1.98 m)
F/C	8	(United States)	Hamilton, Adam	6 ft 9 in (2.06 m)
G	9	(United Kingdom)	Kandé, Sauveur	6 ft 4 in (1.93 m)
G	11	(United States)	Smith, Tavis	6 ft 3 in (1.91 m)
F	12	(United Kingdom)	Sangyang, Mohammed	6 ft 8 in (2.03 m)
F	15	(Canada)	Long, Cole	6 ft 5 in (1.96 m)
G	25	(Italy)	Osarenkhoe, Joseph	6 ft 3 in (1.91 m)
G	27	(United Kingdom)	Shirley, Jalen	6 ft 0 in (1.83 m)
G	41	(Australia) (United Kingdom)	Clarke, Mitch	6 ft 1 in (1.85 m)

Head coach

- (United Kingdom) Marc Steutel

Assistant coach(es)

- (Italy) Roberto Fois

Legend

- (C) Team captain
- Injured

- Roster
Updated: 27 September 2026

=== Women's team roster ===
Note: Flags indicate national team eligibility at FIBA-sanctioned events. Players may hold other non-FIBA nationalities not displayed.

Newcastle Eagles roster
Players
Coaches

Pos.	No.	Nat.	Name	Ht.
G	3	(United States)	Johnson, Jakayla	5 ft 10 in (1.78 m)
G	5	(United Kingdom)	Hinton, Maddy	5 ft 5 in (1.65 m)
G	7	(United States)	Williams, Nala	5 ft 9 in (1.75 m)
G	11	(United Kingdom)	Campbell, Alex	5 ft 7 in (1.70 m)
G/F	12	(United Kingdom)	Campbell, Gemma	5 ft 9 in (1.75 m)
G	13	(Czech Republic)	Cernohorska, Natalie	5 ft 7 in (1.70 m)
F	15	(United Kingdom)	Rae, Grace	5 ft 11 in (1.80 m)
F	20	(United Kingdom)	Storie, Pollyanna	6 ft 2 in (1.88 m)
F	22	(United States)	Harris, Cordasia	6 ft 0 in (1.83 m)
G/F	24	(United States)	Thompson, Raven	5 ft 10 in (1.78 m)

Head coach

- (United Kingdom) Chloe Gaynor

Legend

- (C) Team captain
- Injured

- Roster
Updated: 5 October 2026

=== Notable former players ===
To appear in this section a player must have either:

– Set a club record or won an individual award as a professional player.
– Played at least one official international match for his senior national team at any time.

- (United Kingdom) - (England) Tosan Evbuomwan
- (United Kingdom) - (England) Olu Babalola
- (United Kingdom) - (England) Stedroy Baker
- (United Kingdom) - (England) Flinder Boyd
- (United Kingdom) - (England) Tony Dorsey
- (United Kingdom) - (England) Perry Lawson
- (United Kingdom) - (England) Richard Midgley
- (United Kingdom) - (England) Peter Scantlebury
- (United Kingdom) - (England) Tom Sherlock
- (United Kingdom) - (England) Andrew Sullivan
- (United Kingdom) - (England) Andrew Thomson
- (United Kingdom) - (England) Stuart Thomson
- (United Kingdom) - (Scotland) Steve Leven
- (United Kingdom) - (Scotland) Eddie Matthew
- (Barbados) Nigel Lloyd
- (Denmark) Zarko Jukic
- (Iceland) Pétur Guðmundsson
- (Slovakia) Andre Jones
- (Trinidad and Tobago) Shawn Myers
- (United States) Jeremy Hyatt
- (United States) Scott Martin
- (United States) Trey Moore
- (United States) Dwayne Morton
- (United States) Kadiri Richard
- (United States) Charles Smith
- (United States) Lynard Stewart
- (United States) TJ Walker
- (United Kingdom) - (Wales) Ian Whyte

=== Head coach ===
Stats correct up to and including 31 May 2025

Name	From	To	Regular season		Play-offs			Cup			Trophy			ENBL		Total		Win %	Notes
Name	From	To	W	L	W	L	D	W	L	D	W	L	D	W	L	W	L	%	Notes
(United Kingdom) Dave Elderkin	1987	1988	8	20	0	0	0	1	1	–	3	3	-	-	-	12	24	33.33%	
(United States) Craig Lynch	1988	1990	32	16	1	3	0	1	2	–	6	12	-	-	-	40	33	51.94%	
(United Kingdom) Dave Elderkin	1991	1995	26	109	0	0	0	1	4	–	3	9	-	-	-	30	122	19.74%	
(United States) Tom Hancock	1995	1997	32	40	1	2	0	3	2	–	2	7	-	-	-	38	51	42.70%	
(United States) Craig Lynch	1997	2000	56	52	2	4	0	2	3	–	11	10	-	-	-	71	69	50.71%	
(United Kingdom) Tony Garbelotto	2000	2002	37	31	1	2	0	2	2	–	10	5	-	-	-	50	40	55.55%	
(United States) Fabulous Flournoy	2002	2019	417	137	38	15	0	32	13	1	58	16	-	-	-	545	181	76.60%	
(United Kingdom) Ian MacLeod	2019	2022	35	35	3	1	1	14	13	–	5	3	-	-	-	57	52	52.29%	
(United Kingdom) Marc Steutel	2022	-	43	61	5	6	0	1	2	–	9	6	1	14	7	72	82	46.75%	

=== Hall of Fame ===
As of 2026, only players who have played for the men's team have been inducted into the club's Hall of Fame. Jersey numbers in highlighted gold have been retired.

Newcastle Eagles Hall of Fame
Name	Jersey no.	Position	Tenure	Notes
TJ Walker	5	G	2000-2007	Won 7 trophies with Newcastle.
Darius Defoe	13	F/C	2004-2026	Won 28 trophies with Newcastle. Most decorated player in history of British professional basketball.
Lynard Stewart	15	C	2007-2010	Won 4 trophies with Newcastle.
Fabulous Flournoy	20	G Player-coach	2001-2019; 2003-2019	Won 25 trophies with Newcastle.

== Staff ==
- Chief Executive Officer - Sam Blake
- Managing Director - Paul Blake
- Chief Operating Officer - Susan Hunter
- Head coach – Marc Steutel
- Assistant coach – Gary Stronach
- Team Manager – Eric Wilson
- Club Doctor - Dr Graeme Wilkes
- Physiotherapist - Vicky Percy
- Sports Therapist - Katie Stienlet
- Strength & Conditioning Coach - Anthony Reed
- Development Manager - Ian MacLeod
- Sales & Communications Manager - Dan Black
- Business Strategy Consultant - David Broom
- Media Manager - Simon Rushworth
- Press Officer - Jeff King
- Digital Team - Dave Moore, Gary Forster, Abbie Orwin, Reece Alderson, Phil Duggan, Stu Dryburgh & Logan Forster
- Public Announcer - Howard Leighton
- Events & F&B Manager - Rachel Sweeney
- Arena Operations Supervisors - Neil Curry, Gerda Morkunaite & Kyle Stewart
- Primary Participation Specialist - Anthony Forrester
- Secondary Participation Specialist - Graham Heath
- Development Specialist - Chris Applewhite
- League Specialist - Martin Walton
- Officials Specialist - Matty Langley
- Administration Officers - Taylor Rendles & Laura Ridley
- Receptionists - Kelly Sibblies, Katie Tolic & Liam Bateman
- Arena Assistants - Les Harris & Leroy Sibblines
- Cleaning Technician - Dot Stubley
- Academy coach - Calvin George
- Academy coach - Chloe Gaynor
- Academy coach - Ellen Totten
- Academy coach - Marina Fernandez
- Community Coach - Joan Ducasin
- Community Coach - Adam Hall
- Community Coach - Frank Thomas
- Community Coach - Max Flint
- Community Coach - Carl Thompson
- Community Coach - Jacob Jonas
- Community Coach - Kristen Morten
- Community Coach - Mark Sowerby
- Community Coach - Jack Bertram
- Community Coach - Zak Whitlam
- Community Coach - Laura Ridley
- Community Coach - Mark Sowerby
- Community Coach - Zoe Willis
