= England men's national basketball team =

Men's national basketball team representing England

England
- FIBA ranking: None
- Joined FIBA: 1937
- FIBA zone: FIBA Europe
- National federation: English Basketball Federation
- Coach: Paul James

Olympic Games
- Appearances: 2 (1948, 2012)
- Medals: None

World Cup
- Appearances: None

EuroBasket
- Appearances: 4 (1946, 1955, 1961, 1981)
- Medals: None

Commonwealth Games
- Appearances: 2 (2006, 2018)
- Medals: Bronze: 1 (2006)
Home	Away

The England men's national basketball team is organised by Basketball England, the sport's governing body in England. England's direct membership of FIBA ended in September 2016, when its national teams were merged into Great Britain teams, so England no longer play in FIBA competitions. England competed in the 2018 Commonwealth Games, finishing in fifth place.

England's biggest success were its four qualifications to EuroBasket, the European championship in basketball. The team won the bronze medal at the 2006 Commonwealth Games.

== History ==
=== Eurobasket 1946 ===
England's first European championship appearance was at Eurobasket 1946. They lost all four of the games that they played, and subsequently finished last in the field of ten teams.

=== Eurobasket 1955 ===
A few years later, England qualified for the Eurobasket 1955 in Budapest, where the English Team had a couple of strong showings. After losing their preliminary round games they beat Switzerland, a major player at the global stage until the mid-50s. The victory marked England's first victory at a major international basketball event. Later, England outscored Austria as well. Eventually, the team placed second in the five teams of the classification group, moving to the 9–12 classification semifinals. There, however, England could not take advantage of the gained self-confidence and lost the next two games. Overall, England finished in 12th place out of the 18 teams, a considerable improvement from its last eurobasket appearance in 1946.

=== Eurobasket 1961 and 1981 ===
Despite the improvements in the preceding years, Team England did not do well at the Eurobasket 1961 or the Eurobasket 1981 and lost most games. Its lone victory, however, came in 1981 when they beat the elite team of Greece. This victory still stands as one of the major surprises in the history of the tournament.

=== Commonwealth Games ===
==== Melbourne 2006 ====
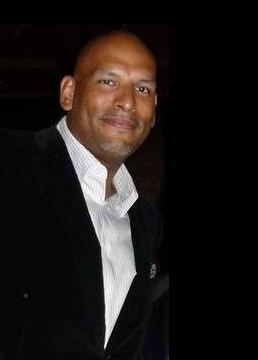
John Amaechi was England's dominant player at the 2006 Commonwealth Games where he helped secure the bronze medal.

The men's and women's teams were competing for the first time as England in a major multi-sport event, and it was the first Commonwealth Games in which basketball was featured.

The men's team included Steve Bucknall, the second Englishman to play in the NBA. John Amaechi, who played 284 games in the NBA, came out of retirement to participate in Melbourne. Having lost to Australia in the semi-finals, they faced Nigeria in the Bronze medal match. The teams were tied at 15 points to end the first quarter. Robert Reed and Andrew Bridge led the way as England found their stride in the second phase, and they pulled away in the second half of play. Reed played like a snake possessed and was the top scorer for England with 16 points and dominating the Nigerians who had no answer to his all action style. Michael Martin also contributed with 13 points. England won the game 80–57 to claim the first bronze medal in Commonwealth Games basketball

Team

- Antony Burns
- Jermaine Forbes
- Andrew Bridge
- Ronnie Baker
- Delme Herriman
- Andrew Sullivan
- Fabulous Flournoy
- Mike Martin
- Robert Reed
- John Amaechi
- Julius Joseph
- Richard Windle

Coaching Staff

- Coach – Peter Scantlebury
- Assistant coach – Michael Hayles
- Assistant coach – Tim Lewis

== Competition charts ==
=== Olympic Games ===
A red box around the year indicates tournaments played within England

Summer Olympic Games record
Year	Position	Pld	W	L
Berlin 1936	did not participate			
London 1948	20th	6	1	5
Helsinki 1952	did not participate between 1952 and 1996			
Atlanta 1996	did not participate between 1952 and 1996			
Sydney 2000	did not qualify			
Athens 2004	did not qualify			
Beijing 2008	did not qualify			
London 2012	9th	5	1	4
Rio de Janeiro 2016	did not qualify			
Total	2/18	11	2	9

Played alongside Scotland and Wales as Team Great Britain.

=== FIBA World Cup ===
FIBA World Cup record
Year	Round	Position	Pld	W	L
Argentina 1950	did not participate between 1950 and 1998				
Greece 1998	did not participate between 1950 and 1998				
United States 2002	did not qualify				
Japan 2006	did not qualify				
Turkey 2010	did not qualify				
Spain 2014	did not qualify				
China 2019	did not qualify				
Philippines/Japan/Indonesia 2023	did not qualify				
Qatar 2027	to be determined				
France 2031	to be determined				
Total	0 Titles	0/21	0	0	0

Played alongside Scotland and Wales as Team Great Britain.

=== Eurobasket ===
FIBA EuroBasket
Year	Position	Pld	W	L
Geneva 1935	did not participate between 1936 and 1939			
Riga 1937	did not participate between 1936 and 1939			
Geneva 1946	10th	5	0	5
Prague 1947	did not participate between 1949 and 1955			
Cairo 1949	did not participate between 1949 and 1955			
Budapest 1955	12th	10	2	8
Sofia 1957	did not participate			
Istanbul 1959	did not participate			
Belgrade 1961	19th	7	0	7
Wroclaw 1963	did not participate between 1963 and 1979			
Turin 1979	did not participate between 1963 and 1979			
Prague 1981	12th	10	2	8
Nantes 1983	did not participate between 1983 and 1997			
Barcelona 1997	did not participate between 1983 and 1997			
Paris 1999	did not qualify			
Istanbul 2001	did not qualify			
Stockholm 2003	did not qualify			
Belgrade 2005	did not qualify			
Madrid 2007	did not qualify			
Katowice 2009	15th	3	0	3
Kaunas 2011	15th	5	2	3
Ljubljana 2013	15th	5	2	3
(France) (Croatia) (Germany) (Latvia) 2015	did not qualify			
(Turkey) (Finland) (Israel) (Romania) 2017	22nd	5	0	5
(Germany) (Czech Republic) (Georgia (country)) (Italy) 2022	24th	5	0	5
(Latvia) (Cyprus) (Finland) (Poland) 2025	to be determined			
Total	31/40	229	139	90

Played alongside Scotland and Wales as Team Great Britain.

=== Commonwealth Games ===
Commonwealth Games record
Year	Round	Position	Pld	W	L
Australia Melbourne 2006	Third Place	3rd	5	3	2
Australia Gold Coast 2018	Quarter Finals	5th	4	2	2
Total	0 Titles	2/2	9	5	4

== Current squad ==
At the FIBA EuroBasket 2003 qualification: (last official squad before formation of Team Great Britain)

England men's national basketball team roster
Players
Coaches

Pos.	No.	Name	Age – Date of birth	Height	Club	Ctr.
	4	Silas Paul Cheung	28 – 14 August 1973			(Germany)
G	5	Yorick Mortimer Williams	26 – 29 July 1975	1.92 m (6 ft 4 in)		(England)
G	6	Julius Joel Joseph	26 – 16 November 1975	1.95 m (6 ft 5 in)		(Belgium)
	6	Iain McKinney	28 – 11 March 1973			(England)
G	7	Ronald Baker	32 – 28 July 1969	1.75 m (5 ft 9 in)		(England)
G	8	Anthony Jerald Dorsey	31 – 15 July 1970	1.95 m (6 ft 5 in)		(England)
F	10	Andy Derek Gardiner	33 – 29 November 1967	2.02 m (6 ft 8 in)		(Belgium)
G	11	Steven Anthony Hansell	26 – 17 February 1975	1.88 m (6 ft 2 in)		(Greece)
	11	Michael Charles Martin	27 – 20 February 1974			(England)
	11	Thomas Christopher K. Pearson	22 – 1 November 1979			(Greece)
	12	Mike Bernard	23 – 14 July 1978			(Cyprus)
C	12	Ian Whyte	30 – 17 September 1971	2.15 m (7 ft 1 in)		(Portugal)
F	13	Delme Leon Jefferson Herriman	28 – 8 May 1973	1.98 m (6 ft 6 in)		(Netherlands)
C	14	Christopher John Haslam	27 – 27 May 1974	2.02 m (6 ft 8 in)		(Belgium)
	14	Richard Windle	25 – 7 April 1976			(England)
C	15	Andrew Betts	24 – 11 May 1977	2.17 m (7 ft 1 in)		(Greece)

Legend

- Club – describes last
  club before the tournament
- Age – describes age
  on 21 Nov 2001

== Past squad ==
1946 EuroBasket: finished 10th among 10 teams

Colin Hunt, Douglas Legg, John Hart, Ronald Legg, Frank Cole, Arthur Lee, Derius Hewitt, Stanley Weston, Ken Dight, Charles Watson (Coach: W.Browning)

1948 Olympic Games: finished 20th among 23 teams

Colin Hunt, Douglas Legg, Ronald Legg, Frank Cole, Robert Norris, Stanley Weston, Lionel Price, Trevor Davies, Malcolm Finlay, Stanley McMeekan, Sydney McMeekan, Alexander Eke, Harry Weston

1955 EuroBasket: finished 12th among 18 teams

Arthur Cladingboel, Reg Fearn, William James, Gordon Cook, Dennis Wilkinson, Colin Wedge, Alan Bruce, Ugo Agnelli, Wilf Byrne, Keith Ledbrook, Michael Roblou, Ronald Rix, N.Smith

1961 EuroBasket: finished 19th among 19 teams

Raymond Kirk, Kornel Tober, Alan Wardle, Peter Creasey, Wilfred Byrne, Alan Tillot, Alan Hildyard, Ronald Hextall, Geoffrey Kaiser, Dennis Wakefield, George Whitmore, Terry Keogh (Coach: Thomas Vaughan)

1981 EuroBasket: finished 12th among 12 teams

David Lloyd, Neville Hopkins, David Berry, Martin Clark, Paul Richards, Nick Burns, Clive Hartley, Jim McCauley, Ian Day, Paul Stimpson, Dan Lloyd, Karl Tatham (Coach: Victor Ambler)

== See also ==
- England women's national basketball team
- Basketball at the 2006 Commonwealth Games
- England at the 2006 Commonwealth Games (Basketball)
- England men's national under-18 basketball team
