= Rob Paternostro =

American professional basketball coach (born 1973)

Leicester Riders
- Position: Head coach
- League: BBL

Personal information
- Born: 16 January 1973 (age 53) Waterbury, Connecticut
- Listed height: 5 ft 11 in (1.80 m)

Career information
- High school: Holy Cross (Waterbury, Connecticut)
- College: Southern New Hampshire (1991–1995)
- NBA draft: 1995: undrafted
- Playing career: 1996–2008
- Coaching career: 2008–present

Career history

Playing
- 1996–1997: Oberwart Gunners
- 1997–1998: Calpe Aguas de Calpe
- 1998–1999: Toulouse
- 1999: Pallacanestro Forlì
- 1999: Connecticut Skyhawks
- 2000–2002: Birmingham Bullets
- 2002: Power Wevelgem
- 2003–2004: Birmingham Bullets
- 2006–2007: Leicester Riders
- 2007–2008: Birmingham Panthers

Coaching
- 2008–present: Leicester Riders

Career highlights
- 7x BBL Coach of the Year (2009, 2013, 2016, 2017, 2018, 2021, 2022); 6x BBL Championship winner (2013, 2016, 2017, 2018, 2021, 2022); 5x BBL Championship Play-offs winner (2013, 2017, 2018, 2019, 2022); 3x BBL Trophy winner (2016, 2017, 2018); 3x BBL Cup winner (2013, 2014, 2022)

Robert Paternostro (born 16 January 1973) is an American professional basketball coach. He is head coach of the Leicester Riders in the British Basketball League.

== High school career ==
Paternostro went to Holy Cross High School in Waterbury, Connecticut. In 1990, he was named to the Connecticut All-State third team, and in 1991, he was named to the Connecticut All-State second team.

Paternostro was also an All-City athlete in soccer and baseball. In basketball, he averaged 25 points per game in his senior year, scoring over 1000 points in two seasons.

== College career ==
Paternostro attended New Hampshire College, now known as Southern New Hampshire University, where he played for the men's basketball team between 1991 and 1995. As point guard for the Penmen, Paternostro helped the team to the Division II Elite Eight three times, including twice reaching the tournament semi-final. During that span the team also became the first in conference history to capture three-straight NECC league tournament titles.

In 2001, Paternostro was inducted into the SNHU Hall of Fame.

He is the all-time assist leader at SNHU with 919 during his career and has also played more games than anyone else in school history (129). Paternostro ranks fourth in three-point field goals made (242) and is sixth on the all-time scoring charts with 1,905 points at an average of 14.8 per game.

=== Freshman year ===
During Paternosto's freshman year, New Hampshire College had a 24-7 record and reached the New England Regional semi-finals, losing to Bridgeport 100–87.

Paternostro averaged 10.8 points and 3.7 assists per game, whilst shooting 50.2% field goals and 44.6% from the three-point line.

His performances earned him the ECAC-North Rookie of the Year award and the NEBCA Rookie of the Year award.

=== Sophomore year ===
During Paternosto's sophomore year, New Hampshire College had a 29–4 record and reached the NCAA Men's Division II Basketball Championship Elite Eight semi-final. They beat South Dakota 100–96 in triple overtime in the quarter-final, before losing 126-123 to Troy State in the semi-final.

New Hampshire College won the NECC Tournament, beating Franklin Pierce 76–71 in the Championship game.

Paternostro averaged 13.5 points and 7.4 assists per game, whilst shooting 45.0% field goals and 40.1% from the three-point line.

His 236 assists during that season ranks 5th in the school's all-time single season list and he was named an ECAC-North All-Star.

=== Junior year ===
During Paternosto's junior year New Hampshire College had a 28-5 record and went all the way to the NCAA Men's Division II Basketball Championship Elite Eight semi-final. Having won through the Northeastern Regional in Philadelphia, Pennsylvania, the Penmen qualified for the Elite Eight in Springfield, Massachusetts. They beat Alabama A&M 100–90 in the quarter-final, before losing 111–89 to Southern Indiana in the semi-final. Paternostro scored 25 points and had 10 assists in the semi-final defeat.

New Hampshire College won the NECC Tournament, beating Franklin Pierce 78–77 in the Championship game.

Paternostro averaged 15.7 points and 7.8 assists per game, whilst shooting 47.4% field goals and 43.2% from the three-point line.

His 258 assists during that season ranks 4th in the school's all-time single season list and he was named an ECAC-North All-Star. His 76 three-point makes is the 9th best in school history.

Paternostro was the team's co-captain alongside Wayne Robertson and Waymon Boone.

=== Senior year ===
During Paternosto's senior year New Hampshire College had a 27–6 record and went all the way to the NCAA Men's Division II Basketball Championship Elite Eight. Having won through the Northeastern Regional in Manchester, New Hampshire, the Penmen qualified for the Elite Eight in Louisville, Kentucky. They were beaten 108-93 by Southern Indiana in the quarter-final.

Paternostro netted 44 points in New Hampshire's 113–110 overtime win against St Rose in the regional semi-final.

New Hampshire College won the NECC Tournament, beating Sacred Heart 84–75 in the Championship game.

Paternostro averaged a team-high 18.8 points and 9.4 assists per game, whilst shooting 43.9% field goals and 35.4% from the three-point line.

His 309 assists during that season is all-time single season record, whilst his contribution in points (620), three-pointers made (242) and free throws made (180) all rank as the fourth highest in school history. Paternostro also set the single season record for minutes played (1,196). Paternostro was the team's co-captain.

Paternostro collected numerous honours during his senior year, including becoming the first player in college history to win the NEBCA Bob Cousy Award. Other awards included NEBCA Player of the Year, NECC Player of the Year, ECAC-North Player of the Year, NABC All-America Second Team, NABC All-District Team, ECAC-North All-Star.

== Professional career ==
Paternostro joined Austrian side Oberwart Gunners during the 1996-97 season. He then had stints at CB Calpe in the Spanish EBA league, at Toulouse in France and at Pallacanestro Forlì in Italy.

Whilst recovering from injury in 1999, Paternostro worked at ESPN in Bristol, Connecticut putting together highlight packages for SportsCenter and NBA Tonight.

He first came to the British Basketball League (BBL) in 2000 when he signed for the Birmingham Bullets. In his first season, he averaged 10.2 points and 4.1 assists in 34 league games, whilst shooting 41.5% from the three-point line.

In January 2002, the Bullets reached the National Cup final, the forerunner to today's BBL Cup, but were beaten 112–105 in a thrilling game by Chester Jets.

The following season Paternostro started the campaign in Belgium, playing eight games for Power Wevelgem and averaging 8.1 points per game, but he returned to Birmingham in January 2003, helping them to an 88–83 win over Essex Leopards in his first game back. He averaged 13.2 points and 5.9 assists in 18 league games.

In 2003–2004 Paternostro continued with Birmingham, where he averaged 8.1 points and 7.8 assists per game.

In 2006–2007 he returned to the BBL, playing for Leicester Riders averaging 6.3 points and 3.6 assists per game.

In 2007–2008 Paternostro played his final season as a player for Birmingham Panthers, but injury issues, limited his appearances to only 18 league games. He averaged 11.4 points and 3.3 assists per game.

== Coaching career ==
Paternostro was appointed head coach of the British Basketball League side Leicester Riders in June 2008. The initial agreement allowed him to become player-coach, but he never took up the option to play.

On 20 May 2021, Paternostro signed a 5-year deal with the Riders.

=== 2008–2009 ===
Paternostro immediately improved the fortunes of the club, guiding them to third place in the BBL Championship in his first season in charge, then the club's best ever finish in the top flight. Their 21 league successes was the second most in club history. Paternostro was named BBL Coach of the Year, becoming the first Leicester Riders coach in BBL history to win the award and the second in club history after Peter Shaw claimed the equivalent prize in the old National Basketball League in the late 1970s.

=== 2009–2010 ===
Despite winning the same number of league games (21) his second season, Riders finished only sixth in the BBL Championship. Paternostro became the first coach in club history to guide the team to consecutive 20 league win seasons. The club also had the second most away wins in a league campaign (10).

On 27 March 2010, the Riders beat Worcester 82–76 to claim an eighth consecutive victory (stretching back to 13 February 2010), one shy of the club top flight record set by Peter Mintoft (24 November 1990 – 30 January 1991) and two shy of the overall record of 11 games, set by Shaw during the club's season in the second division (13 December 1981 – 27 March 1981 and 29 September 1981 – 5 December 1981)

On 17 April 2010, the Riders beat Guildford Heat 86–79 to record a ninth consecutive home league victory (stretching back to 30 January 2010) and equal the record set by Jerry Jenkins (26 January 1994 – 16 April 1994) and Peter Mintoft (21 March 1990 – 30 January 1991).

=== 2010–2011 ===
In Paternostro's third season the club struggled with their away form and as a result finished eighth in the BBL Championship. Their home form was very good and the posted the club's second best return for home wins (16) and home league wins (13) and tied the club record for consecutive home league wins in a single season (9).

On 9 October 2010, Riders beat Milton Keynes Lions 79–61 to record an 11th consecutive home win, tying the club record held by Shaw (7 October 1981 – 6 March 1982) when the team was in the second tier of British basketball.

On 16 October 2010, the Riders beat Essex Pirates 85–58 making Paternostro the fastest coach to win 50 games with the club. The achievement was a bittersweet moment for the club coming as it did on the same evening as the death of the previous record holder Peter Shaw. Paternostro reached 50 wins in 88 games, three quicker than Shaw and in terms of time his 2 years, 1 month and 18 days was 10 months quicker than Billy Mims.

On 18 December 2010, the Riders beat Essex Pirates 93–78 to see Paternostro claim his 49th league win, surpassing Shaw (48) as the record holder.

On 5 February 2011, the Riders beat Sheffield Sharks 89–85 at John Sandford Sports Centre to see Paternostro claim his 36th home win, surpassing the previous record holder Karl Brown (35).

On 26 February 2011, the Riders beat Glasgow Rocks 84–72 to see Paternostro claim his 63rd victory as coach, surpassing Shaw (62 wins) as the coach with the most wins in club history. The victory was also Paternostro's 33rd home league win, which took him past the previous record holder Brown (32).

On 9 April 2011, the Riders beat Newcastle Eagles 87–81 to record a ninth consecutive home league victory (stretching back to 11 December 2010), again tying the club record.

=== 2011–2012 ===
Having made slow starts in each of the first three seasons under Paternostro, the Riders made an impressive start to their 2011–12 campaign. By winning their first four games, they made the second best unbeaten start to a season and their 9–1 record was a club best return for the opening ten games of a season.

On 19 November 2011, the Riders beat Mersey Tigers 92–63 to again reach eight consecutive victories, but their hopes of tying the club top flight record were dashed by a 90–90 draw with Newcastle Eagles in the first leg of a BBL Cup semi-final.

Riders won their opening two league home games of the season, to stretch their winning run to 11 games allowing Paternostro to claim the record outright, beating Durham Wildcats 97–64 in the eleventh game.

On 28 December 2011, the Riders beat Worcester Wolves 99–75 to see Paternostro claim his 30th away victory as coach, surpassing the previous record holder Shaw (29). The victory was also Paternostro's 25th away league win, surpassing the previous record holder Shaw (24).

On 4 February 2012, the Riders beat Sheffield Sharks 74–64 to see Paternostro become the first coach to win 50 home games for Leicester.

Riders finished runners-up in the Championship, their highest ever placing in the top flight and also broke club records in the top flight for league win percentage (78.6%), home league win percentage (78.6%), home win percentage in all competitions (80.0%). Other notable club landmarks from the season included second most league wins (22), second most away league wins (11), tied most away wins in all competitions record (14), second equal consecutive win streak (8), second equal most away win streak (5).

The 22 league wins saw Paternostro break the 20-win mark for the third time as Leicester boss, all other Leicester coaches combined only managed the feat twice. The 11 away league wins was the second time he guided them to more than 10 victories in a season, all the other Leicester coaches combined only managed the feat once. It was also the second top-four finish under his guidance, all other Leicester coaches combined only managed this feat three times.

Riders also won their last 10 home games of the season in all competitions, leaving them one short of tying their record.

=== 2012–2013 ===
Riders won their opening two games of the season, making Paternostro the first coach in the club's 45-year history to win 100 competitive games. The 100th victory, an 80–72 success over Cheshire Jets on 29 September 2012, also saw him reach the landmark of 50 home league victories and extended their home winning streak to 11 games, equaling the record held by Bob Wilson and Peter Shaw for a second time.

In their next outing, Riders beat London Lions 89–83, to stretch their home winning run to 12 games and claim the record outright.

After beating Worcester Wolves to claim a 13th consecutive home win, Riders won on the road at Durham Wildcats on Sunday 21 October to claim a 5–0 record in the BBL. This marked a club record for an unbeaten start since the league was formed in 1987.

Paternostro's team then followed that up with victory at champions Newcastle Eagles on Friday 26 October, becoming the first man to lead the side to victory in Newcastle in over 15 years.

The following day, Riders beat Cheshire Jets 79–75 after overtime to take them top of the table with a 7-0 record. That saw Paternostro match the 28-year club record unbeaten start to a top division season, set by Robert Dixon with a team that included club legend Eugene Waldron in his first season after leaving Syracuse University.

The unbeaten start was recognised by the BBL when he was named Molten Coach of the Month for October.

Riders unbeaten start reached nine games, matching the club's best ever consecutive-game winning streak when they came from behind to beat Plymouth Raiders 83–80. They suffered their first loss at Surrey Heat on 11 November 2012.

Leicester won their next five games, including a 50-point aggregate win over Sheffield to reach the BBL Cup Final. The second leg at John Sandford saw them beat the Sharks 75–45, their biggest ever win against Sheffield and was the fifth lowest points total ever conceded by a Riders team.

On 13 January 2013, Riders defeated Newcastle Eagles 85–80 in a thrilling BBL Cup Final in front of 7,500 people at the National Indoor Arena in Birmingham. It was a third major title for the club and a first for Paternostro.

Later that week, Paternostro turned 40 and the following day was named the Coach/Manager of the Year in the Leicester Mercury Sports Awards, the first time a Riders’ boss had won the award. The Riders also won Club of the Year.

As well as Cup success, Riders were unbeaten in the month of January, seeing Paternostro claim the Molten Coach of the Month award for a second time this season. Their final victory in January saw Riders extend their home unbeaten streak to 20 games.

Leicester continued their excellent form into February winning all six of their encounters. Their 84–59 defeat of the Manchester Giants on 16 February 2013 was their 23rd in a row at home and guaranteed that they become the first Riders teams ever, and only the fifth in BBL history, to go an entire calendar year without losing a home game.

Riders would lose their first home game of the season on 2 March 2013 68-66 to Worcester Wolves in the second leg of the BBL Trophy semi-final, but having won the away leg by nine points, Riders progressed to third consecutive BBL final for the first time in club history. In front of a capacity 8,500 crowd at Wembley Arena, Paternostro and the Riders completed a treble with a 68-57 victory against Newcastle Eagles.

=== 2013–2014 ===
After suffering an early defeat to Worcester Wolves, Riders held Sheffield Sharks to only 40 points in the equal lowest scoring game in British Basketball League history, the fifth time the Riders had kept a team to 45 points or below in Paternostro's tenure.

Riders followed that up with the third biggest win in British Basketball League history beating Surrey United 107-38. Riders set the BBL Championship record for consecutive home league wins at 30 before the streak ended in defeat against Worcester Wolves. At the end of November, Paternostro won his 150th game as a coach beating Manchester Giants 89-87.

Riders quickly got back to top form and in January 2014 defeated rivals Newcastle Eagles in a thrilling BBL Cup Final, Drew Sullivan led a 16-2 finish to the game as Riders won 72-69. That success helped Paternostro claim the British Basketball League Coach of the Month award for January and he was also named Leicester Mercury Coach of the Year 2013.

Any hopes Leicester had of retaining their league title evaporated with back-to-back one-point losses to Newcastle Eagles in March and they would end up finishing fourth with a 23-10 record, the second most wins in a league season and they posted the fewest points conceded in the league for the third consecutive season.

Riders comfortably saw off Cheshire in the play-off quarter-finals, but having won the home semi-final with Newcastle Eagles by 11 points, they eventually lost out in overtime in the second leg.

=== 2014–2015 ===
Leicester won their first five games of the season and when they defeated Bristol Flyers 83-54, Paternostro became only the ninth coach in British Basketball League history to claim a 100th home win.

An amazing buzzer-beating three-point shot by Kieron Achara saw Leicester's hold on the BBL Cup come to an end, but Riders remained in pursuit of Newcastle at the top of the table. In the BBL Trophy Paternostro guided his team to yet another final and once again they were to face off with Newcastle Eagles. This time it was the Eagles who made the dramatic late charge Charles Smith providing the three-pointers to give Newcastle a 96-90 victory.

Victory over Durham Wildcats in early April saw Paternostro claim a 200th career success, becoming only the ninth man in British Basketball League history to do so. Victory over Newcastle on the final day of the season saw Riders win 30 league games in a campaign for only the second time in their history as they finished runners-up in the league.

In the play-offs Riders lost away from home in the first leg by 11 points to Sheffield Sharks and despite wiping out the deficit in the second leg, ended up going out in overtime for the second season in a row.

=== 2015–2016 ===
Riders began the season with 16 wins from their first 17 games including home and away victories over London Lions in the BBL Cup semi-final to set up another date with Newcastle Eagles at the Barclaycard Arena. Riders went through December undefeated to earn Paternostro the British Basketball League Coach of the Month award and also post their second best ever calendar with a 31-4 record, the sixth time he'd led the club to 25 wins in a year.

Riders had looked on course to win back the BBL Cup when leading by as many as 14 points, but another fourth quarter charge saw Newcastle Eagles to a 94-82 success.

Leicester gained some revenge a couple of weeks later with a 94-82 success at Sports Central to give them the edge in the title race and the following day began life in their new home Leicester Arena with a 77-60 victory over Surrey Scorchers.

Riders edged past Sheffield Sharks to reach the BBL Trophy Final, but lost for the first time at Leicester Arena 57-77 in Paternostro's absence as he was at the birth of his daughter. A week later Paternostro and the Riders finally got their hands on the BBL Trophy thanks to an 85-77 victory over the Eagles to complete the set of British Basketball League honours for Paternostro, becoming only the sixth coach in history to win all four honours.

Having won the trophy Riders needed a near perfect run-in if they were to claim the league title and they would claim victory in their next 11 games to put them within sight of a second league success. Included in that spell was a 230th career victory for Paternostro, to move him to fifth on the all-time British Basketball League wins list.

Despite a defeat at Leeds, Riders had a chance to win the league title at Leicester Arena against Newcastle Eagles and a strong second half saw them claim the prize with an 83-74 success. Paternostro was named the Ed Percival British Basketball League Coach of the Year for the third time.

In the play-offs Riders cruised past Leeds Force and Cheshire Phoenix, but in the final fell to another fourth quarter onslaught, this time by Sheffield Sharks going down 84-77.
