= 2016–17 British Basketball League season =

2016–17 BBL season
- League: British Basketball League
- Sport: Basketball
- Number of teams: 12

Regular-season
- Top seed: Leicester Riders
- Season MVP: Rahmon Fletcher
- Top scorer: Rahmon Fletcher (Newcastle Eagles) (676 points)

BBL Tournaments
- BBL Playoffs champions: Leicester Riders
- BBL Playoffs runners-up: Newcastle Eagles
- BBL Cup champions: Newcastle Eagles
- BBL Cup runners-up: Glasgow Rocks
- BBL Trophy champions: Leicester Riders
- BBL Trophy runners-up: Plymouth Raiders

BBL seasons
- ← 2015–16 2017–18 →

The 2016–17 BBL season was the 30th campaign of the British Basketball League since the league's establishment in 1987. The season featured 12 teams from across England and Scotland. The season started on September 23, 2016, and ended on May 14, 2017.

== Apparel ==
As of the 2016/17 BBL season Italian sportswear manufacturer Kappa was the kit supplier for all the 12 teams.

== Teams ==
Locations of the 2016-17 BBL teams

Team	City	Arena	Capacity
Bristol Flyers	Bristol	SGS WISE Arena	750
Cheshire Phoenix	Ellesmere Port	Cheshire Oaks Arena	1,400
Glasgow Rocks	Glasgow	Emirates Arena	6,500
Leeds Force	Leeds	Carnegie Sports Arena	500
Leicester Riders	Leicester	Leicester Arena	2,400
London Lions	London	Copper Box	7,000
Manchester Giants	Manchester	Trafford Powerleague Arena	1,100
Newcastle Eagles	Newcastle upon Tyne	Sport Central	3,000
Plymouth Raiders	Plymouth	Plymouth Pavilions	1,500
Sheffield Sharks	Sheffield	English Institute of Sport	1,200
Surrey Scorchers	Guildford	Surrey Sports Park	1,000
Worcester Wolves	Worcester	University of Worcester Arena	2,000

== Notable occurrences ==
- Cheshire Phoenix announced former player Colin O'Reilly as their new head coach. After an unsuccessful start to the season, O'Reilly left the club after just 14 competitive matches. After weeks of searching for a replacement, he was replaced by Cheshire legend Robbie Peers, who himself only lasted a few games before personal reasons forced him to step down. Assistant coach Ben Thomas took the reins for the remainder of the season.
- Sheffield Sharks head coach Atiba Lyons sparked controversy after the signing of three players from a combine for prospective players he held in the United States. Forward Marquis Mathis didn't play a single game for the club, before signing for English Basketball League side Solent Kestrels, and forward Shaheed Davis lasted only 4 competitive matches. Only point guard Jordan Davis, who had previous professional experience, lasted the season, which was spent mostly on the sidelines due to injury.
- Glasgow Rocks brought in a new assistant coach in the form of Scotland national team coach Erik Olson.
- In a major coup for the club Glasgow Rocks signed championship-winning point guard Neil Watson from the Leicester Riders.
- Newcastle Eagles were to begin a rebuilding process after losing Andrew Thomson to rivals Leicester and club stalwart Charles Smith to retirement at the end of the 2015–16 season. The club signed Orlan Jackman from rivals Worcester Wolves, Deondre Parks from South Dakota State and GB international Joe Hart.
- On the eve of the new season, Leicester Riders signed former Cheshire standout Taylor King, who became available after leaving Lithuanian side Nevėžis. American rookie Donovan Jack was cut without making an appearance for the club to make space on the roster for King.
- The league announced a broadcast deal with BBC Sport to show up to 32 games live via the BBC Red Button and BBC Sport website. The first game shown was Worcester Wolves' thrashing of local rivals Bristol Flyers 88–56. The result would kickstart the Flyers' season, who won 7 of their next 8 league matches.
- Glasgow Rocks set a franchise record of 12 consecutive wins during October, November and December.
- Worcester Wolves brought in influential big man Maurice Walker after a spell with Valmiera in Latvia. Walker would prove to be a catalyst in kickstarting the Wolves' faltering campaign. The club would go on to win 15 of their next 18 league games after his arrival in November.
- Newcastle Eagles won the BBL Cup, defeating the Glasgow Rocks 91–83 in the final at the Barclaycard Arena, Birmingham.
- Manchester Giants became only the third BBL side to have lost a competitive match to a non-BBL team, crashing out of the BBL Trophy 1st Round following an 86–84 away defeat to Essex Leopards. Former BBL player Mike Martin put in a standout performance with 41 points for the Leopards.
- Scottish National League sideBoroughmuir Blaze competed in the BBL Trophy for the first time, losing 74–108 at home to the visiting Plymouth Raiders.
- Manchester Giants announced they had received the appropriate UK Home Office documentation to allow them to sign work permit players in the future.
- Leicester Riders won the BBL Trophy, thrashing Plymouth Raiders 91–58 in the final at the Emirates Arena in Glasgow.
- On the eve of the final weekend of the regular season, Plymouth Raiders announced they had been forced to release star forward Anton Grady for a "serious breach of club and league rules". Although the club declined to comment on the exact nature of the breach, it was reported by British basketball media outlet MVP to be due to a failed drugs test taken after the Raiders' Trophy final defeat in March.
- Plymouth Raiders, despite their healthy playing budget and star studded roster, failed to reach the post season playoffs for the fourth consecutive year.
- Surrey Scorchers reached the post season Playoffs for the first time under their new guise at the second attempt. Finishing 8th with a 15–18 record, the club were drawn against champions Leicester. After a buzzer beating 3 from Gabriel McCray earned the Guildford-based club a rare 73–73 draw in the 1st leg, the Scorchers were comfortably beaten in the return leg at the Leicester Arena.
- Towards the end of the season it was announced that long term Rocks owner and founder Ian Reid had sold his shares in the club to businessman Duncan Smillie, although staying on at the club as non-executive chairman.
- At the end of the season, Glasgow Rocks announced that head coach Sterling Davis would be leaving the club, bringing to an end his 11-year association with the club as a player, player-coach and head coach.
- At the end of the season, Manchester Giants announced that head coach Yorick Williams would not coach the team for the following season after two years at the helm, instead taking on an ambassadorial role within the club. Former assistant coach and Giants' development team head coach Danny Byrne was soon announced as his replacement.
- Despite one year remaining of a two-year contract, Plymouth Raiders announced Jonathan White would not be returning to the club as head coach. BBC Spotlight revealed concerns raised by Raiders' fans of the authenticity of White's original appointment, namely his claimed experience of coaching in the National Basketball League (Australia). Despite numerous requests for interviews, Spotlight were shut out by White and the club.

== BBL Championship ==
=== Regular season ===
==== Standings ====
Pos	Team	Pld	W	L	PF	PA	PD	Pts	Qualification
1	Leicester Riders	33	27	6	2909	2467	+442	54	Qualification to playoffs
2	Newcastle Eagles	33	23	10	3075	2787	+288	46	Qualification to playoffs
3	Glasgow Rocks	33	21	12	2724	2523	+201	42	Qualification to playoffs
4	Sheffield Sharks	33	20	13	2576	2548	+28	40	Qualification to playoffs
5	Worcester Wolves	33	20	13	2911	2745	+166	40	Qualification to playoffs
6	London Lions	33	18	15	2871	2774	+97	36	Qualification to playoffs
7	Bristol Flyers	33	16	17	2564	2659	−95	32	Qualification to playoffs
8	Surrey Scorchers	33	15	18	2651	2762	−111	30	Qualification to playoffs
9	Plymouth Raiders	33	14	19	2916	2912	+4	28	
10	Cheshire Phoenix	33	11	22	2894	2962	−68	22	
11	Leeds Force	33	8	25	2466	2881	−415	16	
12	Manchester Giants	33	5	28	2465	3002	−537	10	

Source: BBL

=== Playoffs ===
==== Bracket ====
Quarter-finals
1	Leicester Riders	73	94	167
8	Surrey Scorchers	73	58	131
3	Glasgow Rocks	70	71	141
6	London Lions	91	62	153
2	Newcastle Eagles	97	84	181
7	Bristol Flyers	94	82	176
4	Sheffield Sharks	71	84	155
5	Worcester Wolves	73	86	159

Semi-finals
1	Leicester Riders	90	72	162
6	London Lions	71	55	136
2	Newcastle Eagles	105	94	199
5	Worcester Wolves	86	111	197

Final
1	Leicester Riders	84
2	Newcastle Eagles	63

==== Final ====
14 May 2017
16:00 GMT

Leicester Riders	84–63	Newcastle Eagles
Scoring by quarter: 29-11, 18-16, 25-17, 12-19
Pts: Thomson 18; Rebs: Hampton 14; Asts: Clark 6		Pts: Fletcher 16; Rebs: Behrens 9 Asts: Fletcher 3

O2 Arena, London
Attendance: 15,000

=== Statistics ===
- minimum of 25 games played

As of 20 May 2017

Category	Player	Team	Statistic
Points per game	Rahmon Fletcher	Newcastle Eagles	20.48
Rebounds per game	Maurice Walker	Worcester Wolves	9.11
Assists per game	Rahmon Fletcher	Newcastle Eagles	6.58
Steals per game	Zaire Taylor	London Lions	2.21
Blocks per game	Kieron Achara	Glasgow Rocks	1.73
Minutes per game	Jamell Anderson	Cheshire Phoenix	36.65

== BBL Cup ==
=== 1st Round ===
Bristol Flyers	71–79	Surrey Scorchers

SGS WISE Arena

Glasgow Rocks	82–77	Leeds Force

Emirates Arena

London Lions	105–79	Plymouth Raiders

Copper Box

Manchester Giants	82–97	Cheshire Phoenix

Trafford Powerleague Arena

=== Quarter-finals ===
Leicester Riders	67–76	London Lions

Leicester Arena

Newcastle Eagles	95–84	Cheshire Phoenix

Sport Central

DBL Sharks Sheffield	57–69	Glasgow Rocks

EIS Sheffield

Worcester Wolves	75–94	Surrey Scorchers

University of Worcester Arena

=== Semi-finals ===
Surrey Scorchers	79–81	Glasgow Rocks

Surrey Sports Park

Glasgow Rocks	87–73	Surrey Scorchers
Glasgow win 168-154

Emirates Arena

London Lions	80–87	Newcastle Eagles

Copper Box

Newcastle Eagles	89–82	London Lions
Newcastle win 176-162

Sport Central

=== Final ===
15 January 2017
15:30 GMT

Newcastle Eagles	91–83	Glasgow Rocks
Scoring by quarter: 20-21, 30-11, 22–17, 19-34
Pts: Rahmon Fletcher (29); Rebs: Scott Martin (10); Asts: Rahmon Fletcher (6)		Pts: Neil Watson (28); Rebs: Kieron Achara (14); Asts: Neil Watson (6)

Barclaycard Arena, Birmingham
Attendance: 9,000

== BBL Trophy ==
=== 1st Round ===
Boroughmuir Blaze	74–108	Plymouth Raiders

The Crags

Derby Trailblazers	67–100	Newcastle Eagles

Noel Baker Sports Centre

Essex Leopards	86–84	Manchester Giants

Brentwood Centre

Glasgow Rocks	74–81	Leicester Riders

Emirates Arena

Leeds Force	68–82	Cheshire Phoenix

Carnegie Sports Arena

London Lions	87–88	Surrey Scorchers

Copper Box

Reading Rockets	74–85	Bristol Flyers

Rivermead Leisure Complex

Worcester Wolves	99–68	Sheffield Sharks

University of Worcester Arena

=== Quarter-finals ===
Cheshire Phoenix	90–71	Bristol Flyers

Cheshire Oaks Arena

Essex Leopards	64–93	Plymouth Raiders

Brentwood Centre

Leicester Riders	104–69	Newcastle Eagles

Leicester Arena

Surrey Scorchers	82–86	Worcester Wolves

Surrey Sports Park

=== Semi-finals ===
Leicester Riders	91–71	Cheshire Phoenix

Leicester Arena

Cheshire Phoenix	64–84	Leicester Riders
Leicester win 175-135

Cheshire Oaks Arena

Plymouth Raiders	96–78	Worcester Wolves

Plymouth Pavilions

Worcester Wolves	90–83	Plymouth Raiders
Plymouth win 179-168

University of Worcester Arena

=== Final ===
19 March 2017
15:30 GMT

Leicester Riders	91–58	Plymouth Raiders
Scoring by quarter: 27-7, 20-19, 25-15, 19-17
Pts: Taylor King (20); Rebs: Taylor King (10); Asts: Conner Washington (7)		Pts: Daryl Corletto (20); Rebs: Cory Dixon (7); Asts: Cory Dixon (4)

Emirates Arena, Glasgow
Attendance: 6,000

== Awards ==
=== Monthly awards ===
Month	Coach of the Month	Player of the Month
October	(United States) (Italy) Rob Paternostro (Leicester Riders)	(United States) Rashad Hassan (London Lions)
November	(United States) (United Kingdom) Sterling Davis (Glasgow Rocks)	(United States) Rashad Hassan (London Lions)
December	(Greece) Andreas Kapoulas (Bristol Flyers)	(United States) Donte Nicholas (Plymouth Raiders)
January	(United Kingdom) Paul James (Worcester Wolves)	(United States) Anton Grady (Plymouth Raiders)
February	(United States) (Italy) Rob Paternostro (Leicester Riders)	(United Kingdom) Kieron Achara (Glasgow Rocks)
March	(United Kingdom) Paul James (Worcester Wolves)	(Canada) (United Kingdom) Jermel Kennedy (Worcester Wolves)

=== Season Awards ===
- BBL Cup MVP: Rahmon Fletcher, Newcastle Eagles
- BBL Trophy MVP: Taylor King, Leicester Riders
- Finals MVP: Pierre Hampton, Leicester Riders
- Player of the year: Rahmon Fletcher, Newcastle Eagles
- Coach of the Year: Rob Paternostro, Leicester Riders
- Molten BBL Team of the year:
  - Kieron Achara – Glasgow Rocks
  - Maurice Walker – Worcester Wolves
  - Rashad Hassan – London Lions
  - Taylor King – Leicester Riders
  - Rahmon Fletcher – Newcastle Eagles
- Molten BBL All-British Team of the year:
  - Kieron Achara – Glasgow Rocks
  - Orlan Jackman – Newcastle Eagles
  - Garreth Murray – Glasgow Rocks
  - Callum Jones – Manchester Giants
  - Conner Washington – Leicester Riders
- Molten BBL All-Defensive Team of the year:
  - Kieron Achara – Glasgow Rocks
  - Scott Martin – Newcastle Eagles
  - Jermel Kennedy – Worcester Wolves
  - Zaire Taylor – London Lions
  - Conner Washington – Leicester Riders

Preceded by 2015–16 season	BBL seasons 2016–17	Succeeded by 2017–18 season
