= Backovic =

Backovic or Backović is a surname. Notable people with the surname include:

- Marko Backovic (born 1997), British-Serbian basketball player
- Slobodan Backović (born 1946), Montenegrin politician and nuclear physicist
