= Founders Hall =

Founders Hall may refer to:

- Founders Hall (Pittsfield, Maine), listed on the NRHP in Maine
- Founders Hall, Heidelberg College, Tiffin, OH, listed on the NRHP in Ohio
- a building on Cornell West Campus
- Founders Hall (Prince Edward Island), Charlottetown, Prince Edward Island
- Naval War College Museum, Newport, Rhode Island, also called Founders Hall
