= Mike Tuck (basketball) =

Canadian basketball player (born 1983)

No. 47 – Sheffield Sharks "II"
- Position: Small Forward
- League: NBL Division 1

Personal information
- Born: 17 March 1983 (age 43) Toronto, Ontario, Canada
- Listed height: 6 ft 7 in (2.01 m)
- Listed weight: 230 lb (104 kg)

Career information
- High school: Markham District High School; Maine Central Institute
- College: Loyola Maryland
- NBA draft: 2008: undrafted
- Playing career: 2008–2022, 2026-present

Career history
- 2008-2009: ETHA Engomis
- 2009: B.B.C. Amicale Steesel
- 2009: Châlons-en-Champagne
- 2009-2022: Sheffield Sharks
- 2026-present: Sheffield Sharks II

Career highlights
- MAAC Sixth Player of the Year (2007); Third-team All-MAAC (2008); BBL Trophy champion (2013); 2× BBL British Team of the Year (2013, 2016); BBL Play-off champion (2016); BBL Play-off MVP (2016); 2× BBL Cup winner (2010, 2011)

Michael Pauleu Tuck (born 17 March 1983) is a Canadian-British basketball player and coach who serves as the player-coach for Sheffield Sharks II of National Basketball League Division One, which is the third level of the British basketball pyramid. He is considered to be a legend for Sheffield Sharks, he played for them for 13 years between 2009 and 2022 in the British Basketball League.

== High school and college career ==
Born in Toronto, Canada, he attended Markham District High School before heading to Maine Central Institute to play for their prep school programme competing in the New England Preparatory School Athletic Council.

Tuck attended Loyola University Maryland where he played for the Loyola Greyhounds men's basketball under Jimmy Patsos.

== Professional career ==
In 2008, Tuck turned professional and had stops in Cyprus (ETHA Engomis), Luxembourg (B.B.C. Amicale Steesel), and France (Châlons-en-Champagne) before eventually signing with the Sheffield Sharks.

With the Sharks, Tuck collected 4 pieces of silverware, most famously the 2016 British Basketball League Playoff Final where he was named MVP after a 20 point, 13 rebound & 4 assist performance. He was also named to the British Team of the Year twice. Tuck is the Sharks longest serving player (13 seasons, 500 games through all competitions), longest serving captain (11 seasons), all-time scoring leader and all-time rebounds leader.

Tuck is a dual passport holder - Canadian \ British (mother was born in England). In 2018, he captained Basketball England at the 2018 Commonwealth Games.

Since 2019, Tuck has been basketball broadcaster with Sky Sports, providing NBA and BBL coverage.
