= Mike Bernard =

Mike Bernard may refer to:

- Mike Bernard (musician) (1875–1936), American musician
- Mike Bernard (painter) (born 1957), English painter
- Mike Bernard (footballer) (born 1948), English footballer
- Mike Bernard (basketball) (born 1978), British basketball player
- Michael Bernard (born 1948), American basketball coach
