= Rahmon Fletcher =

American basketball player (born 1988)

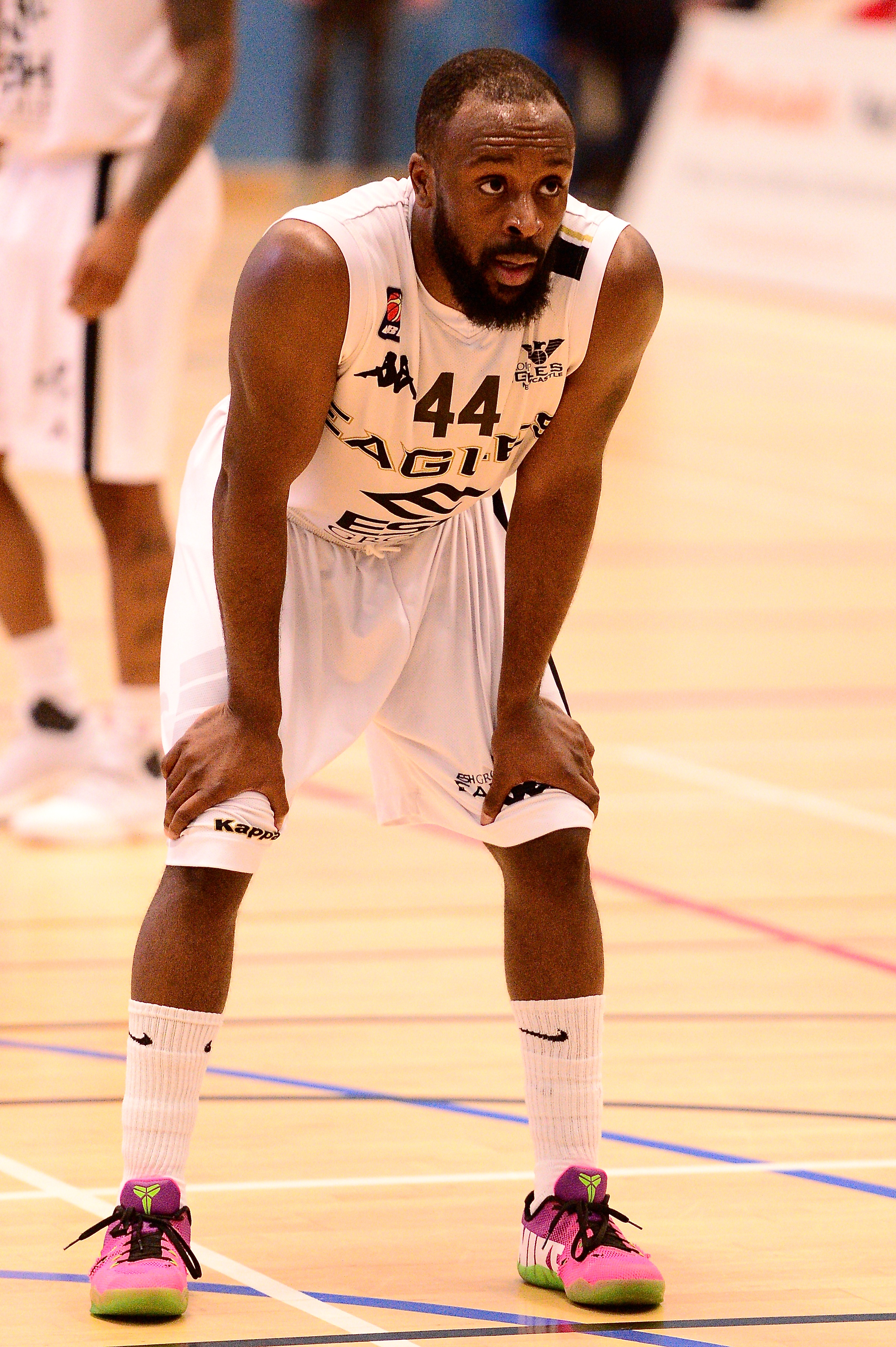
- Fletcher in 2017

Personal information
- Born: November 16, 1988 (age 37) Kansas City, Missouri, U.S.
- Listed height: 5 ft 10 in (1.78 m)
- Listed weight: 165 lb (75 kg)

Career information
- High school: Paseo (Kansas City, Missouri)
- College: Green Bay (2007–2011)
- NBA draft: 2011: undrafted
- Playing career: 2011–2023
- Position: Point guard

Career history
- 2011–2013: BSW Weert
- 2014–2017: Newcastle Eagles
- 2017–2018: Košice
- 2018–2022: Newcastle Eagles
- 2022–2023: Manchester Giants

Career highlights
- 3× BBL Cup MVP (2015–2017); 2× BBL Most Valuable Player (2016, 2017); 4× First-team All-BBL (2015–2017, 2022); BBL Finals MVP (2015); First-team All-Horizon League (2010); 2× Second-team All-Horizon League (2009, 2011); Horizon League All-Newcomer Team (2008)

Rahmon L. D. Fletcher (born November 18, 1988) is an American former professional basketball player who last played for the Manchester Giants of the British Basketball League (BBL). Originally from Kansas City, Missouri, he competed with Green Bay at the college level. Since then, Fletcher has played with multiple teams in Europe, winning the BBL Most Valuable Player Award twice with the Newcastle Eagles.

== High school career ==
Fletcher attended Paseo High School in his hometown of Kansas City, Missouri. When he was a sophomore and senior, the Missouri Sportswriters and Sportscasters Association named him second-team Class 4 All-State. After his junior season, Fletcher earned first-team honors. In the summer of 2006, he took part in a high-profile ADIDAS ABCD Camp, at which he was ranked the 16th best point guard. In March 2007, as a senior, he represented the Kansas City team at the McDonald's Riverwar All-Star Basketball Game, which featured top players from Missouri and Illinois. While in high school, he was also a top player on his AAU team, KC Rocktown.

== College career ==
Fletcher was rated a three-star recruit out of high school by 247Sports.com. Despite receiving initial interest from Southern Illinois, Wichita State, and Missouri State, Fletcher eventually committed to play for the Green Bay Phoenix. He made his debut for Green Bay on November 9, 2007, with 14 points, two rebounds, and three assists in a 76–75 win over Oakland. On December 1, Fletcher scored a career-high 29 points vs. South Dakota State. Mostly taking a starting role, he finished the season averaging 10.1 points, 2.5 rebounds, 3.2 assists, and 1.2 steals per game. He led the Phoenix in total assists and three-point field goal percentage. The freshman also earned Collegeinsider.com Freshman Mid-Major All-American honors and was named to the Horizon League All-Newcomer Team.

Fletcher soon became entrenched as a starter in his second season with Green Bay. He opened his sophomore year on November 18, 2008, by posting six points and five assists in a loss to Utah. In a notable performance vs. Houston Baptist on December 22, Fletcher notched 18 points, eight assists, and three steals. On March 18, 2009, in a College Basketball Invitational (CBI) loss to Vermont and the Green Bay's final game, Fletcher put up his first college double-double, with 16 points and ten assists. He closed the season averaging 10.8 points, 4.5 assists, 2.4 rebounds, and 1.8 steals per game. He ranked third and fourth in the Horizon League field goal percentage and assists respectively. Fletcher additionally garnered second team all-league honors.

== Professional career ==
After being undrafted for the 2011 NBA draft, Fletcher signed his first professional basketball contract with BS Weert of the Dutch Basketball League.

On July 29, 2014, he signed with Newcastle Eagles. Fletcher finished his first season with the Eagles averaging 13.1 points, 6.4 assists and 2.3 rebounds.

On July 7, 2016, Fletcher renewed his contract with Newcastle. He also helped the Eagles for five straight BBL Cup finals and winning three of them. Fletcher lead the league in scoring during the 2016-17 British Basketball League season, scoring 676 points in 38 BBL games for averages of 20.8 points, 2.2 rebounds and 6.7 assists per game.

After a stint in Slovakia, Fletcher returned to the Eagles for the 2018–19 season.
