= Zoltán Supola =

Zoltán Supola may refer to:

- Zoltán Supola (basketball)
- Zoltán Supola (gymnast)
