= Deondre Parks =

American basketball player (born 1992)

Personal information
- Born: October 30, 1992 (age 34) Flint, Michigan, U.S.
- Listed height: 6 ft 1 in (1.85 m)
- Listed weight: 194 lb (88 kg)

Career information
- High school: Kingdom Christian Academy (Columbus, Georgia)
- College: Iowa Lakes CC (2012–2014); South Dakota State (2014-2016)
- NBA draft: 2016: undrafted
- Playing career: 2016–2023
- Position: Point guard
- Number: 0, 11, 22

Career history
- 2016–2017: Newcastle Eagles
- 2017–2018: Cactus Tbilisi
- 2018–2019: AEL Limassol
- 2019: Etoile Sportive Radès
- 2019: Edmonton Stingers
- 2019–2020: Hapoel Hevel Modi'in
- 2020–2021: Vilpas Vikings
- 2021–2022: Zalakerámia
- 2022: BC Astana
- 2023: Sigal Prishtina
- 2023: SCM U Craiova

Career highlights
- Finish League champion (2021); Cypriot League Top Scorer (2019); Cypriot League All-Star (2018); Georgian Superliga Top Scorer (2018); BBL Cup winner (2017); First-team All-Summit League (2015); Atlantic Sun Freshman of the Year (2015)

Deondre Kendrell Parks Jr. (born October 30, 1992) is an American former professional basketball player. He played college basketball at Iowa Lakes Community College and at South Dakota State before playing professionally in the United Kingdom, Georgia, Cyprus, Tunisia, Canada and Israel.

== High school career ==
Parks played high school in his hometown of Flint, MI at Flint Northwestern High School. Parks finished his prep career at Kingdom Christian Academy in Columbus, Georgia

== College career ==
=== Iowa Lakes Community College ===
Parks began his career at Iowa Lakes Community College, where he averaged 15.3 points, 5.4 rebounds and 2.5 assists per game as a freshman. As a sophomore, he averaged 20.4 points, 5.2 rebounds and 2.7 assists per game, leading the team to a 23-9 overall record, earning ICCAC Division II All-Region First Team honors along the way.

=== South Dakota State ===
Parks transferred to South Dakota State for last two seasons. He averaged 14.4 points and 4.3 rebounds per game for the Jackrabbits and was named first-team All-Summit League and Atlantic Sun Freshman of the Year in 2015.

== Professional career ==
=== Newcastle Eagles (2016–2017) ===
On August 2, 2016, Parks signed with Newcastle Eagles of the British Basketball League (BBL).

=== Cactus Tbilisi (2017–2018) ===
On September 5, 2018, Parks signed with Cactus Tbilisi of the Georgian Superliga. He averaged 20.8 points, 3.5 rebounds, 3.1 assists per game.

=== Proteas EKA (2018–2019) ===
On September 13, 2018, Parks signed with Proteas EKA AEL . He averaged 18.7 points per game, being the top scorer of the league.

=== Hapoel Hevel Modi'in (2019–2020) ===
On September 2, 2019, Parks signed with Hapoel Hevel Modi'in for the 2019–20 season. He averaged 22.1 points, 4.9 rebounds and 3.3 assists per game.

=== Vilpas Vikings (2020–2021) ===
On September 25, 2020, Parks signed with Konyaspor of the Turkish Basketball First League. However, he instead joined the Vilpas Vikings of the Korisliiga.

=== ZTE KK (2021–2022) ===
In 2021, Parks signed with ZTE KK of the Hungarian Nemzeti Bajnokság I/A. He averaged 13.0 points, 2.4 rebounds, and 1.5 assists per game.

=== Sigal Prishtina (2023) ===
On January 12, 2023, Parks signed with Sigal Prishtina of the Kosovo Basketball League.
