= Kieron Achara =

Scottish basketball player (born 1983)

Kieron Achara MBE
Personal information
- Born: 3 July 1983 (age 43) Stirling, Scotland
- Listed height: 6 ft 10 in (2.08 m)
- Listed weight: 240 lb (109 kg)

Career information
- High school: Stirling High School (Scotland); Maine Central Institute (Pittsfield, Maine)
- College: Duquesne (2003–2008)
- NBA draft: 2008: undrafted
- Playing career: 2008–2019
- Position: Power forward

Career history
- 1999–2002: Falkirk Fury
- 2001–2002: Teesside Mohawks
- 2008–2009: Fortitudo Bologna
- 2009–2010: Angelico Biella
- 2010: Glasgow Rocks
- 2010–2011: Sigma Barcellona
- 2011–2012: Assignia Manresa
- 2012: Glasgow Rocks
- 2012–2013: Kavala BC
- 2013–2014: Lukoil Academic
- 2014: Sidigas Avellino
- 2014–2015: Falkirk Fury
- 2015–2019: Glasgow Rocks

Career highlights
- BBL All-Defensive First Team (2018)

Kieron Robert Nnamdi Achara MBE (born 3 July 1983) is a Scottish professional basketball player who last played for the Glasgow Rocks. He is a 6-foot-10-inch (2.08 m) forward who played college basketball at Duquesne University and represented Scotland and Great Britain at national team level.

== Professional career ==
After graduating from Duquesne University Achara turned professional in 2008. He began his career abroad in Italy. He came back to Scotland in 2010 when he joined Scotland's only professional basketball team, the Glasgow Rocks. On 26 September 2010, Achara debuted for the Glasgow Rocks in a game against Sheffield Sharks, which they won 80–76. Following two successful years in Spain Achara signed a short two-week contract in 2012 with the Glasgow Rocks. After further spells in Europe, Achara re-signed for the Rocks for the 2014-15 season. He retired in 2019 after reaching three BBL Cup finals with the team (2015, 2017 and 2019), finishing on the losing side on each occasion.

Achara was recognised by Stirling Highland Games as a famous born son of Stirling and offered him the honorary position as their 2019 Games Chieftain.

== National team career ==
Achara is the youngest player ever to play for the Scotland national team, featuring in the FIBA Europe Promotion Cup. He made his debut for Great Britain in 2008, shortly before turning professional. Achara was a part of the British Basketball team which took part in the London 2012 Olympics.
