= ABCD Camp =

US high school basketball camp

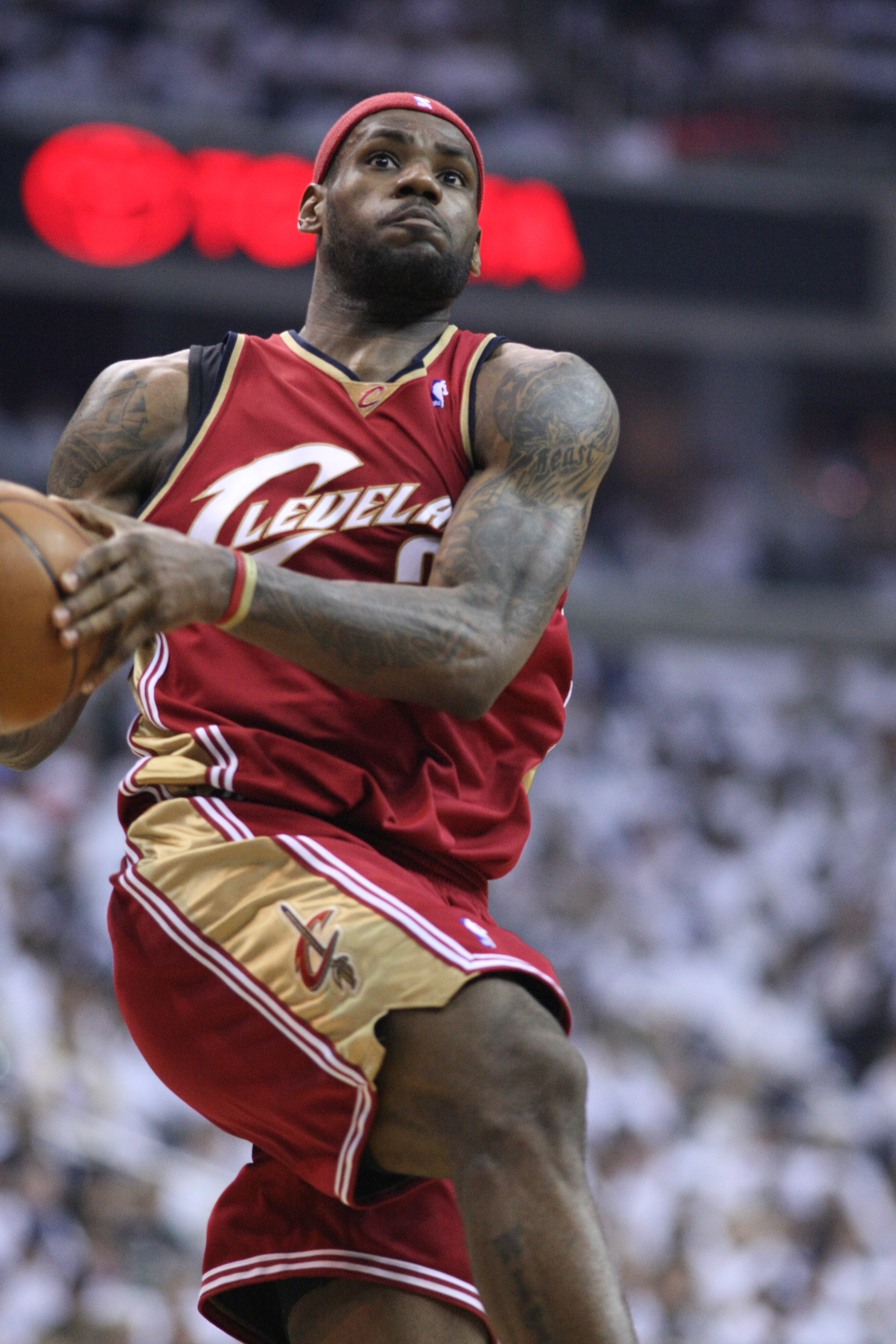
LeBron James was Camp MVP in 2001 as an underclassman and was one of the camp participants to be drafted out of high school.

The ABCD Basketball Camp was a youth basketball camp founded by Sonny Vaccaro that was held from 1984 to 2006. The camp gathered the highest ranked high school players of the United States, and was considered one of the top events of high school basketball. ABCD stood for Academic Betterment and Career Development.

== History ==
The ABCD Camp was founded in 1984 by Sonny Vaccaro and was sponsored by Nike. The camp took place every year in the month of July usually lasting 4–5 days, and was held in different locations in the initial years, among which the Bren Events Center at UC Irvine in 1992 and at Eastern Michigan University in Ypsilanti, Michigan in 1993 before moving to the Rothman Center, at Fairleigh Dickinson University in Hackensack, New Jersey, where the camp was held from 1994 until its final edition in 2006.

The camp was sponsored by the corporations Vaccaro was signed to: from 1984 to 1992 Nike was the sponsor; in 1993 the camp was under the Converse brand, while from 1994 to 2003 Adidas was the sponsor. After 2003, Vaccaro had a deal with Reebok that lasted until the last edition of the camp in 2006. Several college coaches attended ABCD Camp during their recruitment process of high school players: among them Bob Bender, Jim Boeheim, P. J. Carlesimo, Joe Harrington and Mike Krzyzewski. NBA scouts also participated and in some cases, camp participants were drafted out of high school, for instance Kevin Garnett, Kobe Bryant, Jermaine O'Neal, Tracy McGrady, Kwame Brown, Eddy Curry, Sebastian Telfair and Gerald Green.

== Sponsorships ==
- 1984–1992: Nike
- 1993: Converse
- 1994–2003: Adidas
- 2004–2006: Reebok

== Camp MVPs ==
Year	Class	Player	High School	State
1992	Seniors	Antonio McDyess	Quitman	Mississippi
1992	Underclassmen	Felipe López	Rice	New York
1993	Seniors	Willie Mitchell	Detroit Pershing	Michigan
1993	Underclassmen	Lester Earl	Glen Oaks	Louisiana
1993	Underclassmen	Stephon Marbury	Abraham Lincoln	New York
1994	Seniors	Stephon Marbury	Abraham Lincoln	New York
1994	Underclassmen	Tim Thomas	Paterson Catholic	New Jersey
1995	Seniors	Kobe Bryant	Lower Merion	Pennsylvania
1995	Underclassmen	Khalid El-Amin	Minneapolis North	Minnesota
1996	Seniors	Dion Glover	Cedar Grove	Georgia
1996	Seniors	Anthony Perry	St. Anthony	New Jersey
1996	Underclassmen	Clarence Gilbert	Dillard	Florida
1996	Underclassmen	Stromile Swift	Fair Park	Louisiana
1997	Seniors	Rashard Lewis	Elsik	Texas
1997	Underclassmen	DerMarr Johnson	Maine Central Institute	Maine
1998	Seniors	Leon Smith	Martin Luther King	Illinois
1998	Underclassmen	Alton Ford	Milby	Texas
1999	Seniors	Taliek Brown	St. John's Prep	New York
1999	Seniors	Avery Queen	Maine Central Institute	Maine
1999	Underclassmen	Apolinar Fernandez	Artesia	California
1999	Underclassmen	T. J. Ford	Willowridge	Texas
2000	Seniors	Billy Edelin	Oak Hill Academy	Virginia
2000	Seniors	Mo Williams	Murrah	Mississippi
2000	Underclassmen	Lenny Cooke	Northern Valley Regional	New Jersey
2000	Underclassmen	Charlie Rodríguez	Clovis West	California
2001	Seniors	DeAngelo Collins	Inglewood	California
2001	Seniors	Antonio Lawrence	San Joaquin Memorial	California
2001	Underclassmen	LeBron James	St. Vincent–St. Mary	Ohio
2001	Underclassmen	Sebastian Telfair	Abraham Lincoln	New York
2002	Seniors	Travis Outlaw	Starkville	Mississippi
2002	Seniors	Charlie Villanueva	Blair Academy	New Jersey
2002	Underclassmen	Sebastian Telfair	Abraham Lincoln	New York
2002	Underclassmen	Darius Washington Jr.	Edgewater	Florida
2003	Seniors	Shaun Livingston	Peoria	Illinois
2003	Seniors	Josh Smith	Oak Hill Academy	Virginia
2003	Underclassmen	Tasmin Mitchell	Denham Springs	Louisiana
2003	Underclassmen	Brandon Rush	Mount Zion Christian Academy	North Carolina
2004	Seniors	Danny Green	St. Mary's	New York
2004	Seniors	Monta Ellis	Lanier	Mississippi
2004	Underclassmen	Derrick Caracter	St. Patrick	New Jersey
2004	Underclassmen	Greg Oden	Lawrence North	Indiana
2005	Seniors	Damion James	Nacogdoches	Texas
2005	Seniors	Greg Oden	Lawrence North	Indiana
2005	Underclassmen	Kevin Love	Lake Oswego	Oregon
2005	Underclassmen	O. J. Mayo	North College Hill	Ohio
2006	Seniors	DeAndre Jordan	Christian Life Center Academy	Texas
2006	Seniors	Taylor King	Mater Dei	California
2006	Seniors	Kevin Love	Lake Oswego	Oregon
2006	Seniors	O. J. Mayo	Huntington	West Virginia
2006	Seniors	Bill Walker	North College Hill	Ohio
2006	Underclassmen	William Buford	Libbey	Ohio
2006	Underclassmen	Drew Gordon	Archbishop Mitty	California

== Notable players ==
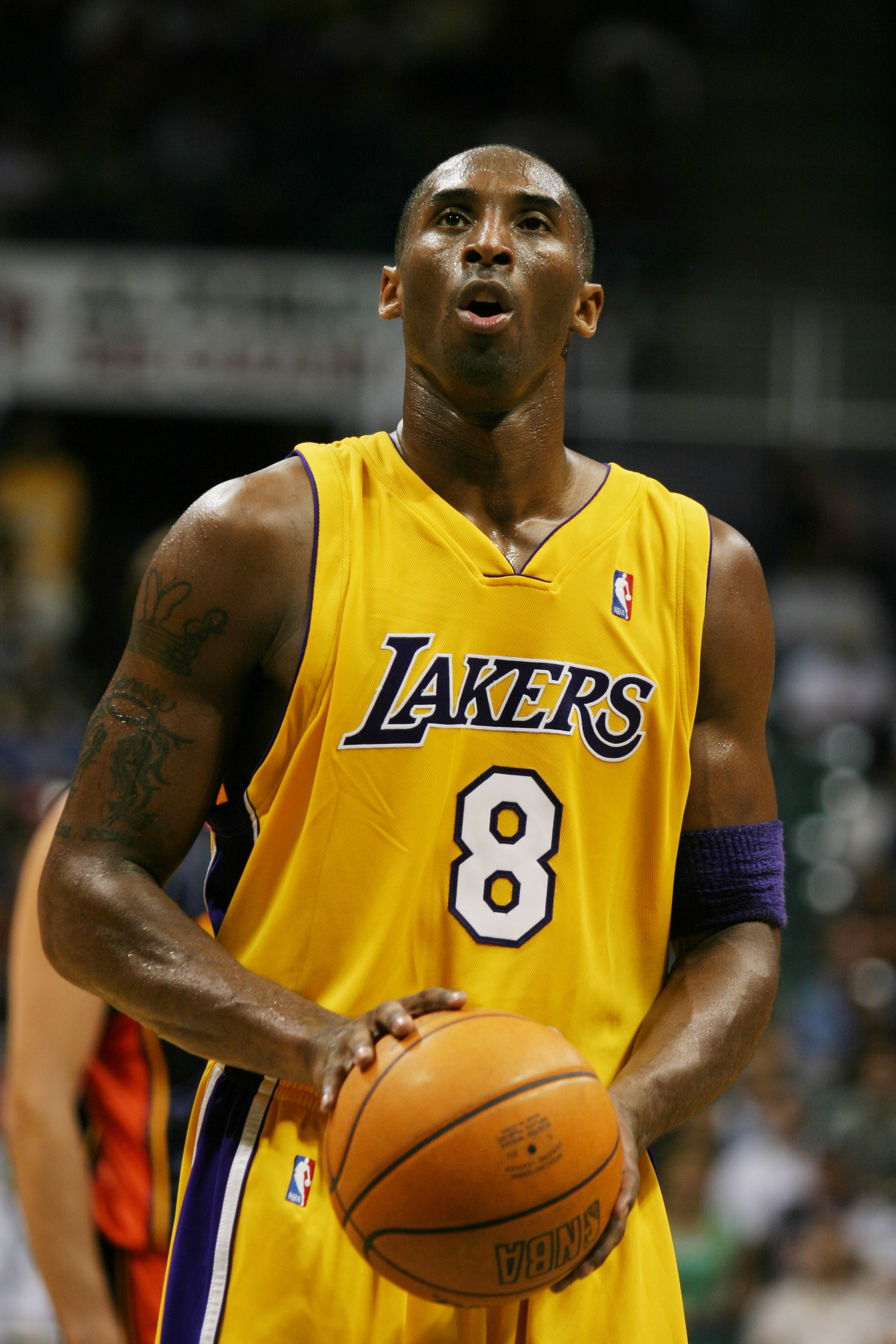
Kobe Bryant was Camp MVP in 1995.

The players mentioned have at least 1 All-Star selection in the NBA or were lottery picks in the NBA draft.

- Shareef Abdur-Rahim
- Cole Aldrich
- Carmelo Anthony
- Gilbert Arenas
- Chauncey Billups
- Carlos Boozer
- Chris Bosh
- Kwame Brown
- Kobe Bryant
- Marcus Camby
- Sam Cassell
- Derrick Coleman
- Mike Conley
- Eddy Curry
- Mike Dunleavy Jr.
- Jonny Flynn
- Randy Foye
- Kevin Garnett
- Ben Gordon
- Eddie Griffin
- Penny Hardaway
- Tim Hardaway
- James Harden
- Allan Houston
- Dwight Howard
- Juwan Howard
- LeBron James
- Brandon Jennings
- DerMarr Johnson
- Joe Johnson
- DeAndre Jordan
- Jason Kidd
- Christian Laettner
- Shaun Livingston
- Rashard Lewis
- Kevin Love
- Stephon Marbury
- Kenyon Martin
- Jamal Mashburn
- O. J. Mayo
- Antonio McDyess
- Tracy McGrady
- Alonzo Mourning
- Jameer Nelson
- Joakim Noah
- Jermaine O'Neal
- Shaquille O'Neal
- Greg Oden
- Lamar Odom
- Tony Parker
- Paul Pierce
- Jason Richardson
- Glenn Robinson
- Derrick Rose
- Jalen Rose
- Jerry Stackhouse
- Damon Stoudamire
- Stromile Swift
- Wally Szczerbiak
- Sebastian Telfair
- Isaiah Thomas
- Tim Thomas
- Robert Traylor
- Antoine Walker
- Gerald Wallace
- Rasheed Wallace
- Chris Webber
- Chris Wilcox
- Yi Jianlian
