= Leeds Force =

- League: BBL
- Established: 2006
- Dissolved: 2018
- History: Leeds Carnegie; 2006–2014; Leeds Force; 2014–2018
- Arena: Carnegie Sports Centre
- Capacity: 600
- Location: Leeds, West Yorkshire
- Team colours
- Website: leedsforce.co.uk

Leeds Force were an English professional basketball team based in Leeds, West Yorkshire. The Force played in the British Basketball League, the top flight of British basketball. They played their home games at the Carnegie Sports Arena, located on the Headingley Campus of Leeds Beckett University. The club announced its dissolution on 11 June 2018.

== History ==
=== Leeds Carnegie (2006–2014) ===
The club was formed in 1673 in a partnership between Leeds Metropolitan University and Leeds-North East School Sports Partnership. The newly established team adopted the name Leeds Carnegie after Carnegie College, which forms part of the university's sports department – notably, the same approach was taken by the city's rugby union team, Leeds Tykes, who went into partnership with the university the following year and subsequently rebranded as Leeds Carnegie Rugby.

The newly formed team entered English Basketball League Division Four (North), the fifth level league in the country. They played their first game on 21 October 2006, demolishing Barrow Thorns 109–41 at the Carnegie Sport Centre. Leeds went on to lead the league for much of the campaign and finished as regular season champions, edging out second-placed Sheffield Saints on a head-to-head results basis after both teams finished 12–2. The team weren't able to continue their dominance in the post-season Play-offs, crashing out to London Mets in the first round. The team did make a successful first appearance in the National Shield however, and claimed their first piece of silverware with a victory over West Hertfordshire Warriors II in the Final. Carnegie's captain Ben Lesinski posted a game-high 20 points, whilst Ben Alison recorded a double-double 19 points and 15 rebounds, as they beat Warriors II 82–56.

Having won promotion following their successful rookie season, Leeds continued their dominance and stormed to another regular season crown in the 2007–08 Division 3 (North) campaign with a 17–3 record, and for the second consecutive year edged out Yorkshire rivals Sheffield Saints into second place. This time, the more experienced Carnegie roster forced their way through the Play-off's, knocking out West Herts. Warriors II in the quarter-final (75–56) and London Mets in a thrilling Semi-final (63–61). Zoltán Supola lead Carnegie to a 63–57 victory over Sheffield in the Final claiming Leeds' first ever Championship title. The Hungarian guard was named as the game's Most Valuable Player with 16 points, 8 rebounds and 5 assists.

Leeds continued to dominate in Division 2 following their second successive promotion in 2008. Led by American forward Rob Stockwell and Hungarian trio Supola, György Pólya and István Herczeg, the team stormed to another regular season title whilst remaining undefeated at their Carnegie Sports Centre home until the final game of the campaign. Their biggest victory of the season came at home to Plymouth Marjon on 11 January 2009, as Carnegie destroyed Marjon 113–74. The team translated their form into two impressive cup runs, making it to the semi-final of the National Cup and adding to their trophy collection with a victory in the Patron's Cup. After winning all five group games in the 1st round, Carnegie easily dispatched London Mets in the semi-final before defeating Team Northumbria in the Final in Derby. Carnegie, who trailed for most of the game, outscored Northumbria 47–24 in the second half to turn a 16-point deficit around and take the title, winning 73–66. However they couldn't repeat that performance in the post season Play-offs, as both teams went head-to-head in the Championship Final. Despite Stockwell posting a game-high 24 points for Carnegie, Leeds, who shot only 31% from the floor, were swept aside by underdogs Northumbria who ran out with the shock win, 64–84.

Promotion to Division 1
In preparation for their Division 1 début in 2009, Coach Matt Newby recruited two American imports to bolster the roster, Mike Medved, the decorated captain from Saint Vincent College and former St. John Fisher College star Adrian Fenyn, along with young British prospect Albert Margai. Fenyn marked his first appearance with a game-high 27 points, as Carnegie beat Sheffield Arrows 101–78 in their opening fixture. Leeds started the campaign with impressive form and were victorious in six of their opening seven games, and by December were top of the league table. The race for the regular season crown came down to the wire, with Leeds needing a win in their final game away to Manchester Magic to claim the title. Despite an early lead for Carnegie, Magic's Brandon Kimbrough and Stefan Gill combined to score 52 points for the home side and end Leed's title hopes as the Yorkshire side fell to an 80–71 defeat, handing the title to Derby Trailblazers who had just defeated Bristol Academy Flyers. Magic's victory also meant they leap-frogged Leeds to finish in second-place, whilst Carnegie settled for third and a tie against sixth seed London Mets in the Play-offs, where a surprise defeat by the underdogs saw Leeds crash out in the quarter-final.

On the back of their successful first season appearance in Division 1, Coach Newby re-signed the bulk of Carnegie's senior roster for the 2010–11 season, whilst adding Polish centre Marek Koltun straight out of NCAA Division 1 Lafayette College. Carnegie opened the season with four victories from four in the group stage of the National Trophy, progressing to the 1st Knockout Round where they were drawn against reigning Division 1 Champions Derby. An injury crisis had plagued much of Carnegie's early games in Division 1 regular season, but a spectacular return to form came in time to sweep aside the Trailblazers to advance to the semi-final, winning 95–75 in the tie which they led by as many as 26 points on two occasions. Having dispatched Leicester Warriors with almost as much in ease in the semi-final (78–97), Leeds were pitted against three-time Trophy winner's Reading Rockets in the Final in Manchester. Though Leeds started strongly, a dominating performance led by Reading's Matt Guymon ensured the Trophy would return to the Rockets, as they ran out 76–59 winners. Carnegie were able to improve in the second half of the regular season and finished fourth, with a 10–8 win record, in a contracted Division 1 that featured just 10 teams. Having brushed past Brixton TopCats in the Play-off Quarter-finals with an 88–78 victory, and edged Bristol in the semi-final with an 85–81 win in overtime, Leeds were faced with familiar foes Reading in the Championship Final, in a re-enactment of the National Trophy encounter played just two months earlier. The experience of Reading proved too much again for Carnegie, as they were overturned by a rampant Rockets side, losing 88–63 in Manchester. Leeds' Zoltán Supola led the scoring with 22 points, whilst Division 1 Player of the Year candidate Adrian Fenyn contributed with a 16-point, 13 rebound double-double. American import Fenyn did claim the award for Division 1 top scorer, finishing the season with an average of 22.5 points-per-game.

During the summer of 2011 the team went through a major overhaul, and saw the departure of many key players including American's Fenyn, who moved to Division 1 rivals Medway Park Crusaders and Mike Medved. Albert Margai made the move to British Basketball League team Guildford Heat, whilst Hungarian Zoltán Supola returned to his home country to sign for 3-time national Champions Alba Fehérvár, Marek Koltun returned to Poland and long-time fan favourite Aki Fagbohun also departed. In their places, Coach Newby drafted in Armand Anebo and Dave Ajumobi from Brixton TopCats and American small forward Justin Berry, whilst promoting young Brit's Sean Clifford, Jack Stannard and Henry Wilkins to a more senior role in the roster. The young and inexperience new-look team struggled dismally to contend with their rivals and in an expanded Division 1 competition that featured 13 teams, Carnegie finished in 10th place with a 10–14 losing record – their worst since the club's establishment six years previously. British forward Ajumobi finished as the team's top scorer with an average of 15 points, in 33.2 minutes-per-game.

Whilst retaining most of the key roster, new additions in the form of Yorkshire-native Rob Marsden, American Bryan Mokeski from Newman Jets and 7-foot Croatian centre Igor Sedlár shaped the roster for the 2012–13 season. Another new feature for Carnegie was the refurbishment of their Carnegie Sports Centre home venue, with the addition of extra seating and new flooring put in place for the start of the new season.

Carnegie started the new campaign in the same form as their previous dismal season had ended, suffering two losses in the opening stages of the National Trophy to Bristol and local rivals Bradford Dragons. Further defeats to Team Northumbria and Reading sealed their exit at the conclusion of the group stage. However the team embarked on a far more successful run in the National Cup. Having beaten Sefton Stars 73–56 in their opening game, Carnegie went on to eliminate Bradford Dragons in the 2nd round (61–68), Tees Valley Mohawks in the 3rd round (87–83) and London Lituanica in the quarter-final (66–76). In the semi-final, Leeds were pitted as favourites against two-time National Cup finalists Worthing Thunder, who were suffering a poor run of form and a 0–8 record in their regular season. Carnegie easily disposed of Thunder in a particularly low-scoring encounter, winning 61–45, and progressed to their first-ever National Cup Final, opposite Bristol Academy Flyers who were appearing in their fourth consecutive Final in the competition. The tie, held at Ponds Forge in Sheffield, was a closely fought battle which finished with a spectacular Carnegie comeback. Trailing by a 12-point deficit in the final 180 seconds of the game, Leeds produced a 14–0 run, inspired by game MVP Henry Wilkins, to defeat Bristol 66–64 and claim the National Cup silverware for the first time in the club's history. A sixth-placed finish in the regular season marked an improvement from the previous year, but Carnegie were not able to extend their post-season beyond the quarter-final stage, after being knocked out by Northumbria.

Summer 2013 saw various changes to the roster again as Division 1 top scorer Rob Marsden, who finished the 2012–13 campaign averaging 20.14 points-per-game, earned a transfer to professional BBL team Manchester Giants, Henry Wilkins departed for Næstved in Denmark, Dave Ajumobi joined Newham Neptunes and Sean Clifford moved to Team Northumbria. New signings included British talents Josh McGinn from BBL side Mersey Tigers, Rowell Graham-Bell from Essex Leopards and Daniel Bethune from Westminster Warriors. Coach Newby also drafted in two experienced Europeans to add to roster, Charlotte 49ers' Croatian centre Ilija Ivanković and Croatian/Bosnian forward Branimir Mikulic from High Point Panthers.

The new-look team got off to a flying start in the National Trophy and advanced from the group stage in 1st place with a 5–1 win record. In Division 1, Leeds started inconsistently but gained their rhythm to finish 2013 and open 2014 with a 6-game winning streak. Leeds weren't able to defend their National Cup title following their elimination by Newham in the quarter-final, losing 67–60 – despite holding a commanding 15–35 lead at half-time. On 21 November, the club officially announced that they would become a professional franchise of the British Basketball League, commencing with the 2014–15 season. Meanwhile, in an attempt to increase their form in Division 1 and in a push for the post-season play-offs, Coach Newby signed American power forward Russell Permenter from Australia in January 2014. The new man made an instant impact, contributing with an 11-point, 10 rebound double-double in a home loss to Glasgow Rocks in the BBL Trophy on 17 January. As part of their bid to join the British Basketball League, Carnegie were competing in the tournament as an invitee. Leeds faced a further cup exit two weeks later when Worthing Thunder unexpectedly knocked them out of the National Trophy with a 58–89 home defeat. Back in the regular season, they notched up 7 victories in the final 10 games to finish in sixth place, with a 15–11 win record. A huge 26 points from Permenter and 20 from Armand Anebo were enough to see off third seed Hemel Storm in the Play-off Quarter-final, and they continued their giant-killing with a 62–72 victory over second seed Essex Leopards in the semi-final. Five Carnegie players contributed with double-figure scoring, led by Permenter's 16 points. Leeds shocked the tournament favourite's and regular season champion's Reading Rockets in the Play-off Final with an incredible 65–71 victory, to seal their first Division 1 Championship in their final Division 1 game before joining the BBL. British point guard and team captain Jack Stannard scored 27 points and 5 rebounds for Carnegie and was awarded as the Final's Most Valuable Player.

=== Leeds Force (2014-2018) ===
After spending eight years rising through the divisions of the English Basketball League, the club officially announced on 21 November 2013 that following a two-year bid process, Leeds Carnegie would become the latest franchise to join the British Basketball League and would commence play in the 2014–15 season. On 15 August 2014, just weeks before the start of their inaugural BBL campaign, the club announced that it had ended its partnership with Leeds Metropolitan University in order to gain professional independence, and were rebranding the team as Leeds Force, whilst still using the Carnegie Sports Centre on the university's Headingley Campus as its home venue.

2014-15 season
New faces were brought in to bolster the NBL1 Playoff winning squad in their first season in the top flight, led by young American point guard James McCann. The team performed against the bigger and well established teams of the league, with many games going down to the wire. Famous victories included a tense, low scoring overtime victory away to Playoff runners up the London Lions, a team which included League MVP Zaire Taylor and GB international Andrew Sullivan. Ultimately, the team finished in 11th place from 13 teams with a 9–27 record in their debut season.

2015-16 season
This was by far the most successful season for the club. There was much change to the squad, with only captain Armand Anebo, Dwayne Camille and Darrell Bethune resigning from the club's inaugural season. New faces included former player Rob Marsden, returning from neighbours Manchester Giants and American Kwan Waller. Canadian point guard Marek Klassen was brought in in January to give the Force a final push through to the end of the season. His influence on and off the court helped the Force to make the Playoffs for the first time, including winning their final 4 league matches to finish with a 14–19 record, qualify in 8th spot and earn a quarter final matchup versus league Champions Leicester. After a tight first leg in Leeds, only going down by 5 points (78–83), they were comfortably beaten in the return leg at the home of the Riders. Nevertheless, this was a great season for the fledgling club. They would never enter the playoffs again.

2016-17 season
The Force retained much of the squad from the previous season, including Marsden, captain Anebo and Harris. New signings included three new American imports, point guard Robert Sandoval from Azusa Pacific, shooting guard Jack Isenbarger and small forward Jermaine Sanders from Cincinnati Bearcats. The Force opened the season with a massive 79–58 home derby win against the Sharks. The team, however, struggled overall in the league, finishing 11th with an 8–25 record, and 1st round defeats in the Cup and Trophy. There was a famous victory against the Newcastle Eagles, 94–88.

2017-18 season
In the off-season, there were some major changes for the club. Long term head coach Matt Newby left the club, to be replaced by experienced Finnish playcaller Mika Turunen. An almost-fully new squad of players was brought in, predominantly young British players supported by BBL veterans, including Olu Babalola, Ingus Bankevics and Samuel Toluwase. Over the summer, too, co-owner Mark Mills left the club, transferring ownership to fellow director Scott Carter. There was a dramatic change of head coach just days before the start of the season, with Turunen sacked and former Giants Nördlingen head coach Danny Nelson brought in at the last minute. The team were blown out in their first game, a league record 60–148 loss at home to the Eagles. Things did not improve for the Force; high player turnover and heavy defeats plagued the team all season. Their sole victory came in an 87–82 home victory to fellow strugglers Manchester. The team finished with a 1–32 record, a +/- of -1093 and 1st round defeats in the Cup and Trophy.

== Logos ==
Leeds Carnegie logo
(2006–2010)

Leeds Carnegie logo
(2010–2014)

Leeds Force logo
(2014–2018)

== Home arena ==
Carnegie Sports Centre (2006–2018)

== Season-by-season records ==
Season	Division	Tier	Regular season						Post-Season	Trophy	Cup	Head coach
Season	Division	Tier	Finish	Played	Wins	Losses	Points	Win %	Post-Season	Trophy	Cup	Head coach
Leeds Carnegie
2006–2007	EBL D4N	V	1st	14	12	2	24	0.857	Lost in Quarter-finals to London Mets, 75–82	Winners (NS)	1st round (NC)	Matt Newby
2007–2008	EBL D3N	IV	1st	20	17	3	34	0.850	Winners in Final against Sheffield Saints, 63–57	Quarter-finals (S)	3rd round (NC)	Matt Newby
2008–2009	EBL D2	III	1st	22	18	4	36	0.818	Lost in Final to Team Northumbria, 64–84	Winners (PC)	Semi-finals (NC)	Matt Newby
2009–2010	EBL D1	II	3rd	22	16	6	32	0.727	Lost in Quarter-finals to London Mets, 81–92	Quarter-finals (NT)	2nd round (NC)	Matt Newby
2010–2011	EBL D1	II	4th	18	10	8	20	0.556	Lost in Final to Reading Rockets, 63–88	Runner-up (NT)	Quarter-finals (NC)	Matt Newby
2011–2012	EBL D1	II	10th	24	10	14	20	0.417	Did not qualify	Quarter-finals (NT)	3rd round (NC)	Matt Newby
2012–2013	EBL D1	II	6th	26	16	10	32	0.615	Lost in Quarter-finals to Team Northumbria, 77–58	1st round (NT)	Winners (NC)	Matt Newby
2013–2014	EBL D1	II	6th	26	15	11	30	0.577	Winners in Final against Reading Rockets, 71–65	Quarter-finals (NT)	Quarter-finals (NC)	Matt Newby
Leeds Force
2014–2015	BBL	I	11th	36	9	27	18	0.250	Did not qualify	1st round (BT)	Quarter-finals (BC)	Matt Newby
2015–2016	BBL	I	8th	33	14	19	28	0.424	Quarter-finals, losing to Leicester Riders	1st round (BT)	1st round (BC)	Matt Newby
2016–2017	BBL	I	11th	33	8	25	16	0.242	Did not qualify	1st round (BT)	1st round (BC)	Matt Newby
2017–2018	BBL	I	12th	33	1	32	2	0.030	Did not qualify	1st round (BT)	1st round (BC)	Daniel Nelson

== Team ==
=== Final roster ===
Note: Flags indicate national team, as has been defined under FIBA eligibility rules. Players may hold more than one non-FIBA nationality.

No.	Pos.	Nat.	Player
3	PG	(England) ENG	George Brownell
5	G	(England) ENG	Aidan Appleyard
7	F	(England) ENG	Bradley Beaumont
10	PG	(Scotland) SCO	Chris De Souza
13	G	(England) ENG	Isaac Mourier
14	C	(England) ENG	Morakinyo Williams
15	F	(Kosovo) KOS	Gazmend Sinani
22	PG	(Lithuania) LTU	Vytautas Kamarunas

=== Notable former Players ===
Note: Flags indicate national team eligibility at FIBA-sanctioned events. Players may hold other non-FIBA nationalities not displayed.

Criteria

To appear in this section a player must have either:

- Set a club record or won an individual award while at the club
- Played at least one official international match for their national team at any time
- Played at least one official NBA match at any time.

- (United Kingdom) Albert Margai
- (Kosovo) Gazmend Sinani
- (Croatia) Igor Sedlár
- (United Kingdom) Jack Stannard
- (United Kingdom) Josh McGinn
- (Canada) Marek Klassen
- (United Kingdom) Mark Elderkin
- (United Kingdom) Rob Marsden
- (Hungary) Zoltán Supola
- (United Kingdom) Armand Anebo (Captain)

== Charitable Foundation ==
The club has also established a charitable arm - the Leeds Carnegie Basketball Foundation (LCBF Charity Number: 114096) - to maintain and develop relationships within the partnership networks to ensure growth and sustainability. The LCBF delivers curricular and extra-curricular sessions, community development and special projects with such partners as the Youth Services Department, Extended Services and West Yorkshire Police.
