= Nick George (basketball) =

British basketball player

Personal information
- Born: 25 September 1982 (age 43) Manchester, England
- Listed height: 1.98 m (6 ft 6 in)
- Listed weight: 87 kg (192 lb)

Career information
- High school: Montrose Christian (Rockville, Maryland)
- College: VCU (2002–2006)
- NBA draft: 2006: undrafted
- Playing career: 2006–2015
- Position: Forward

Career history
- 2006–2007: Benetton Treviso
- 2007: Andrea Costa Imola
- 2007–2008: Lucentum Alicante
- 2008: BCM Gravelines
- 2008–2010: Junior Casale
- 2011: Sant'Antimo
- 2011–2012: Lugano Tigers
- 2013: Manchester Giants
- 2013–2014: Plymouth Raiders
- 2014–2015: Lancashire Spinners

Career highlights
- Swiss League champion (2012); Italian Supercup winner (2006)

Nicholas James George (born 25 September 1982) is a British former professional basketball player.

== College career ==
George played four seasons of college basketball at Virginia Commonwealth University scoring a total of 1546 points. With the Rams he would win the 2004 Colonial Athletic Association regular season and tournament en route to his only NCAA tournament appearance.

== Professional career ==
George started his professional career in 2006 with Italian club Benetton Treviso before moving to second division Imola. George would later play for Alicante, Dunkerque and Casale Monferrato before being forced to retire due to knee problems in 2010. However, after successful rehabilitation and a brief period with former team Casale Monferrato towards the end of the 2010–2011 season, George signed for newly promoted Legadue team Pallacanestro Sant'Antimo.

On 12 December 2012, it was announced that he had signed a contract with his hometown team Manchester Giants of the British Basketball League, after being released by former club Lugano Tigers due to injury.

== International ==
George was part of the Great Britain national basketball team that qualified and competed in the 2009 Eurobasket championship in Poland.
