= Manchester Giants =

British professional basketball team

- League: NBL Division 2
- Founded: 2011
- History: Manchester Giants (2011–present)
- Arena: The Hough End Centre
- Location: Chorlton-cum-Hardy, Manchester
- Team colors
- Website: Official website
Home	Away

The Manchester Giants are a British amateur basketball (was a professional team in 2012–2024) team based in Manchester, England. They currently play in NBL Division 2, which is the fourth-tier in the British basketball pyramid. The franchise was established in 2011, and admitted to the top-tier British Basketball League in 2012 until they were replaced by the new franchise Manchester Basketball in 2024. The team's formation was led by a consortium headed by Graham Herstell.

== History ==
Plans for a new Manchester-based British Basketball League franchise were first reported in spring 2011, initially with the city's English Basketball League outfit, Manchester Magic (headed by former NBA star John Amaechi), mooted as a possible candidate. However, after no formal bid was made, Graham Herstell put together a consortium to start a new professional basketball franchise and revive the Giants brand. A formal application to join the top-tier British Basketball League was made in January 2012, which was accepted and officially announced on 19 June, joining fellow new franchise East London Royals for the 2012–13 season. It was also announced that the new team would use the 900-seat capacity Wright Robinson College 'M18 Leisure' facility, in Gorton, as its venue for home fixtures, with a long-term plan to move to a 2,500-seat purpose-built venue as part of the redevelopment of the city's Eastlands area.

On 17 July, it was revealed via a link posted on Giants' Twitter account regarding team merchandise that the team would be wearing a purple, white and green themed kit, manufactured by Irish-based sportswear brand O'Neill's. On 19 August, media reports confirmed that the first player to sign for the new-look Giants was Nottinghamshire-born forward David Watts, who had previously played for Worcester Wolves. More signings were later unveiled with Manchester-born players Nathan Schall and Stefan Gill (formerly of Cheshire Jets and Milton Keynes Lions respectively) joining ex-Mersey Tigers star David Aliu and brothers Callum and James Jones (both sons of Giants coach Jeff Jones) in the line-up, whilst Great Britain international Nick George was rumored to be a transfer target. Former Giants star Mike Bernard was also confirmed as a new recruit along with young prospect Devan Bailey, just days before the start of the new campaign.

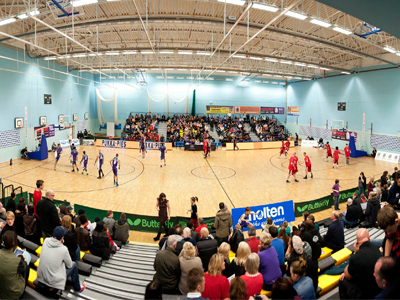
Wright Robinson College arena

The new-look Giants played their first competitive game against London Lions on 21 September 2012, at their home venue at Wright Robinson College. A sell-out crowd witnessed a tight one-point victory in favour of the Giants, winning 85–84, with James Jones posting 29 points for the home team. The following week, a convincing 99–87 victory at home to Sheffield Sharks meant Giants had opened the season with a 100% record, however their form soon dipped as the new team recorded only one win in the subsequent 12 games. Former Great Britain Under-23 international Ben Eaves was signed at the end of October in a bid to improve Giants' fledgling squad, whilst a deal to sign long-term target Nick George was eventually agreed in December. The team's form gradually started to improve throughout the winter with victories against Durham Wildcats, local rivals Cheshire Phoenix and Mersey Tigers, as well as back-to-back home wins over title-chasing Surrey Heat in January and February 2013. It was announced on 19 February that Nick George had departed the club after making only six appearances. Giants continued with their resurgent form in a bid for a top-eight finish and a place in the end-of-season Play-offs, taking it down to the penultimate game of the regular season. However an 85–87 home defeat to fellow Play-off chasers London Lions – despite a heroic comeback from the Giants who were down 19 points at the start of the fourth quarter – saw Lions take eighth-place and the final Play-off spot, consigning Giants to a ninth-place finish in their rookie season.

Throughout the 2013 off-season the club announced several new partnerships and projects in the Manchester area, including the launch of a basketball academy with The Manchester College and a development partnership with Stockport Falcons basketball club. The team continued its policy of signing locally-produced players with the unveiling of Keith Page as the team's first new signing for the 2013–14 season, replacing Devan Bailey. The roster was also bolstered with the signing of veteran Yorick Williams, a stalwart of the previous Giants franchise, as well as Robert Marsden from Leeds Carnegie, Spanish forward Iker Amutxastegui and French swingman Papis Sambe. Nigeria international Jayson Obazuaye was also brought in by Coach Jones, but his transfer fell through due to the club not receiving international clearance for the player. The team improved on their rookie season performance with a 14–19 record during the regular season and qualified for the post-season Play-offs for the first time. The seventh-seeded Giants were drawn in a two-game series against the second-seed Sheffield Sharks in the quarter-finals. The first game saw the Giants edged out by the Sharks, 60–63, at the Wright Robinson College arena, whilst the second game in Sheffield finished in a rare stalemate between the two rivals, ending 78–78. Due to Sharks' three-point advantage in the first leg, they advanced from the series with an aggregate score of 141–138. There was some success for the team however, as three Giants players were recognised in the BBL's End of Season awards honours, with David Aliu, James Jones and rookie Robert Marsden all selected as part of the Molten British Team of the Year.

The Giants management announced in June 2014 that the team would be leaving Wright Robinson College and switching to a new home venue, the 1,100-seat Trafford Powerleague Arena, for the start of the 2014–15 season.

== Logos ==
2012–2013

2013–2020

2020–present

== Home arena ==
- Wright Robinson College (2012–2014)
- Trafford Powerleague Arena (2014–2019)
- George H. Carnall Centre (2019–2020)
- National Basketball Centre (2020–present)

In February 2018, the club announced plans to move into a new, 2000+ capacity arena, renovating and expanding the previous George H. Carnall Centre as part of a £35 million development in Urmston, Greater Manchester. However, after a change in leadership in the borough council, these plans are considered unlikely to go ahead.

== Season-by-season records ==
Season	Division	Tier	Regular Season						Post-Season	Trophy	Cup	Head coach
Season	Division	Tier	Finish	Played	Wins	Losses	Points	Win %	Post-Season	Trophy	Cup	Head coach
Manchester Giants
2012–13	BBL	1	9th	33	12	21	24	0.364	Did not qualify	1st round (BT)	1st round (BC)	Jeff Jones
2013–14	BBL	1	7th	33	14	19	28	0.424	Quarter-finals, losing to Sheffield	Quarter-finals (BT)	1st round (BC)	Jeff Jones
2014–15	BBL	1	9th	36	12	24	24	0.333	Did not qualify	1st round (BT)	1st round (BC)	Jeff Jones
2015–16	BBL	1	11th	33	8	25	16	0.242	Did not qualify	1st round (BT)	1st round (BC)	Yorick Williams
2016–17	BBL	1	12th	33	5	28	10	0.152	Did not qualify	1st round (BT)	1st round (BC)	Yorick Williams
2017–18	BBL	1	11th	33	4	29	8	0.121	Did not qualify	1st round (BT)	1st round (BC)	Danny Byrne
2018–19	BBL	1	9th	33	14	19	28	0.424	Did not qualify	Semi-finals (BT)	Semi-finals (BC)	Danny Byrne
2019–20	BBL	1	Season cancelled due to COVID-19 pandemic							1st round (BT)	Pool Stage (BC)	Danny Byrne
2020–21	BBL	1	10th	30	10	20	20	0.333	Did not qualify	1st round (BT)	Semi-finals (BC)	Danny Byrne; Lloyd Gardner
2021–22	BBL	1	5th	27	14	13	28	0.519	Quarter-finals	Quarter-finals (BT)	Runners-Up (BC)	Lloyd Gardner
2022–23	BBL	1	6th	36	17	19	34	0.472	Quarter-finals	1st round (BT)	Quarter-finals (BC)	Vince Macaulay
2023–24	BBL	1	9th	36	9	27	18	0.250	Did not qualify	Pool Stage (BT)		Brian Semonian

== Players ==
=== Notable former players ===
Note: Flags indicate national team eligibility at FIBA-sanctioned events. Players may hold other non-FIBA nationalities not displayed.

Criteria

To appear in this section a player must have either:

- Set a club record or won an individual award while at the club
- Played at least one official international match for their national team at any time
- Played at least one official NBA match at any time.

- (United Kingdom) Callum Jones
- (Latvia) Ingus Bankevics
- (United Kingdom) James Jones
- (United Kingdom) Stefan Gill
- (United Kingdom) Ben Eaves
- (United Kingdom) Mike Bernard
- (United Kingdom) David Watts
- (United States) Willie Clayton
- (United States) Mike McCall
- (Austria) Moritz Lanegger
- (United Kingdom) Jerelle Okoro
- (United Kingdom) Devan Bailey
- (United Kingdom) Nick George
- (United States) Rahmon Fletcher
- (United Kingdom) Kofi Josephs

== See also ==
- British Basketball League
- Manchester Giants (1975–2001)
- Manchester Magic
