= Marko Backovic =

British-Serbian basketball player

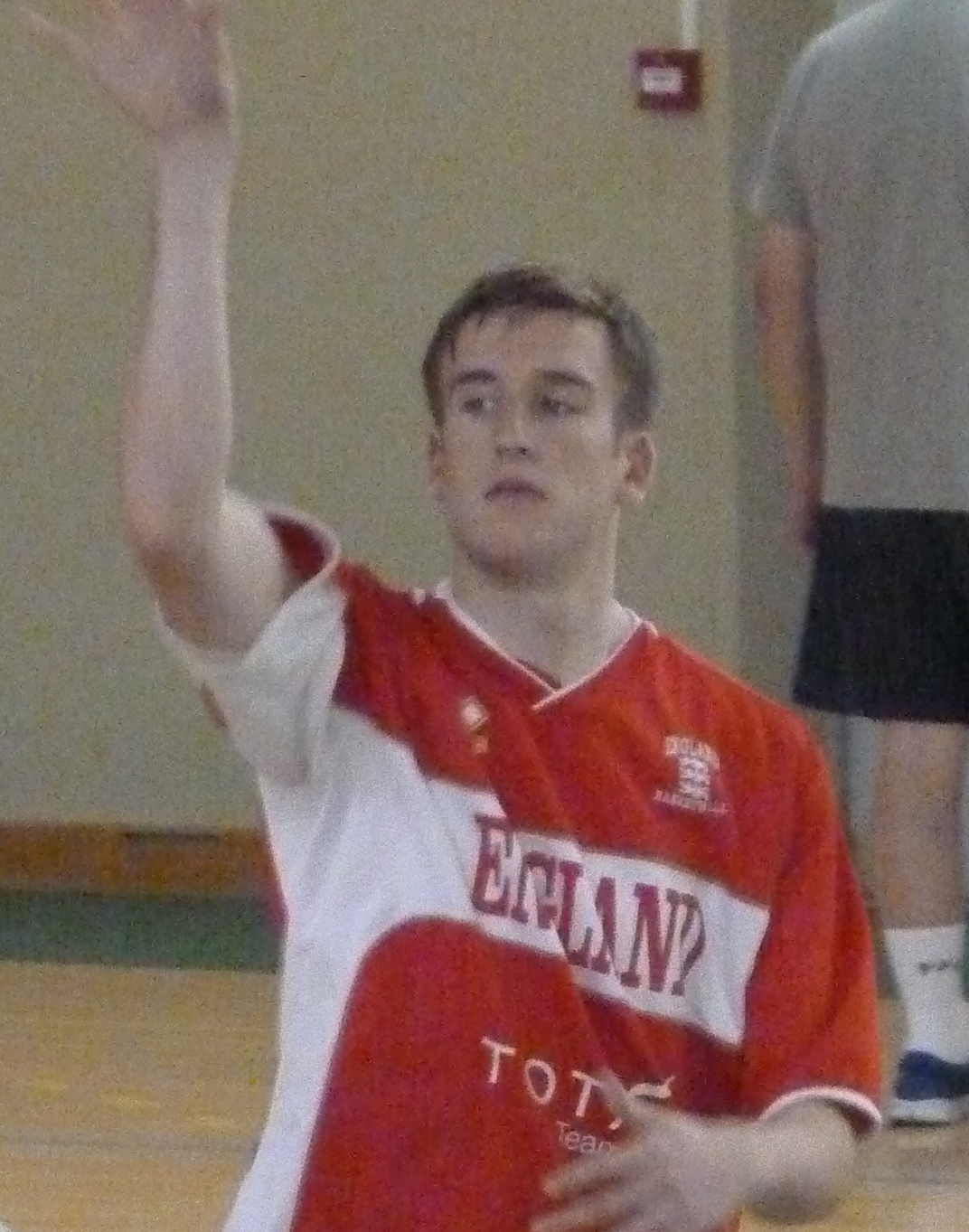
- Backovic playing for England U16 in 2012

Sheffield Sharks
- Position: Assistant coach
- League: Super League Basketball

Personal information
- Born: February 19, 1997 (age 29) Sheffield, England
- Listed height: 6 ft 5 in (1.96 m)

Career history

Playing
- 2012–2020: Sheffield Sharks

Coaching
- Sheffield Sharks (assistant coach)

Career highlights
- As player: British League champion (2016); As assistant coach: SLB Cup Winner (2025)

Marko Backovic (born February 19, 1997) is a British-Serbian former professional basketball player, who is currently the assistant coach for Sheffield Sharks of Super League Basketball (SLB).

Backovic took up basketball in secondary school, whilst attending Stocksbridge High School. From starting with Sheffield Junior Sharks, Marko was very quickly selected by the England and also Great Britain national basketball team.

Whilst in secondary school Marko was representing the age bracket above his own age, for both England and Great Britain. Marko was also scouted by several American high schools and received a number of offers to study in the US.

Marko was part of the Sheffield Sharks roster who won the 2016 BBL Playoffs at the O2 Arena. Sharks claimed an 84-77 victory over the highly fancied Leicester Riders.
