= Ben Eaves (basketball) =

British basketball player

No. 21 – Manchester Giants
- Position: Small forward / power forward
- League: British Basketball League

Personal information
- Born: 10 April 1987 (age 39) Preston, Lancashire, England
- Listed height: 2.03 m (6 ft 8 in)
- Listed weight: 103 kg (227 lb)

Career information
- High school: Worcester Academy (Worcester, Massachusetts)
- College: UConn (2006–2007); Rhode Island (2008–2011)
- NBA draft: 2011: undrafted
- Playing career: 2011–present

Career history
- 2011–2012: APOEL
- 2012–2013: Manchester Giants
- 2013–2014: Plymouth Raiders
- 2014–2015: Manchester Giants
- 2015–present: Worcester Wolves

Ben Eaves (born 10 April 1987) is a former professional basketball player.

== Pre-professional career ==
Eaves played a post-graduate year in the United States at Worcester Academy. Following his post-graduate experience, he played one season with the University of Connecticut before transferring to the University of Rhode Island. Playing three seasons with the Rams, Eaves would finish his senior year averaging 3.1 points and 2.5 rebounds in 12.4 minutes.

== Professional career ==
Eaves started his professional career in 2011 with Cypriot team APOEL.

== International ==
Eaves has represented Great Britain at U20 and U23 level.
