= Taylor King =

American retired professional basketball player

Personal information
- Born: May 30, 1988 (age 38) Huntington Beach, California, U.S.
- Listed height: 6 ft 8 in (2.03 m)
- Listed weight: 230 lb (104 kg)

Career information
- High school: Mater Dei (Santa Ana, California)
- College: Duke (2007–2008); Villanova (2009–2010); Concordia (2010–2011)
- NBA draft: 2011: undrafted
- Playing career: 2011–2018
- Position: Small forward

Career history
- 2011–2012: London Lightning
- 2012: Quebec Kebs
- 2012: Dacin Tigers
- 2012–2013: Kinmen Kaoliang Liquor
- 2014: Pioneros de Los Mochis
- 2014–2015: Cheshire Phoenix
- 2015–2016: Nevėžis Kėdainiai
- 2016–2017: Leicester Riders
- 2017: Agua Caliente Clippers
- 2018: Atenas de Carmen de Patagones

Career highlights
- Second-team Parade All-American (2007); McDonald's All-American (2007); California Mr. Basketball (2007)
Medals
Men's basketball
Representing USA
FIBA Americas U18 Championship
Gold medal – first place	2006 San Antonio	Team competition

Taylor Steven King (born May 30, 1988) is an American former professional basketball player. King played for the Duke Blue Devils, Villanova University Wildcats, and Concordia of the NAIA. where he played the forward position. King attended Mater Dei High School of Santa Ana, where he enjoyed a successful high school basketball career, posting the third highest career point total in California high school history with 3,216 points.

== High school career ==
King established several school records while at Mater Dei: total career points (3,216), points in a single season (987 in 2007), career 3-pointers made (370), career rebounds (1,456) and rebounds in a single season (444 in 2006). He participated in the ABCD Camp, a camp for the best high school players in the United States, in each of his 4 high school seasons (2003 to 2006).

== College career ==
King played for Duke his freshman year. He transferred to Villanova University following the spring 2008 semester. Per NCAA regulations, King did not compete in the 2008–09 season, but returned for the 2009–10 season, with three more years of collegiate eligibility.

During the summer of 2010, Taylor King left the Villanova men's basketball team for what a team spokesman said were "personal reasons". On August 11, 2010, it was announced that King had transferred to USC. However, shortly after, it was announced he would not be attending USC but actually the NAIA school Concordia.

== Professional career ==
On October 21, 2011, it was announced that King had made the final 12-man roster for the National Basketball League of Canada's London Lightning. However, on January 17, the Lightning released him, leaving room for him to be signed by the Quebec Kebs on February 2.

On September 17, 2014, King signed a one-year contract with Cheshire Phoenix of the British Basketball League, coached by John Coffino. King made an instant impact, leading the league in scoring with an average of 20.1ppg in 33 games, which included a 36-point game against the Sheffield Sharks. King was also fifth in the league in rebounding, with an average of 9.5rpg.

After the 2017–18 season, King retired from basketball.
