= Atiba Lyons =

American basketball player and coach

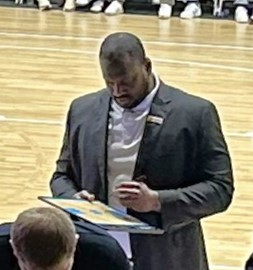

Sheffield Sharks
- Title: Head coach
- League: Super League Basketball

Personal information
- Born: July 30, 1982 (age 44) Brooklyn, New York
- Listed height: 1.98 m (6 ft 6 in)
- Listed weight: 100 kg (220 lb)

Career information
- High school: Lemon Bay High School (Englewood, Florida)
- College: Pace (2001–2005)
- NBA draft: 2005: undrafted
- Playing career: 2004–2013
- Position: Forward
- Coaching career: 2012–present

Career history

Playing
- 2004–2006: Kauhajoen Karhu
- 2006–2007: Sheffield Sharks
- 2007–2008: Ironi Ramat Gan
- 2008–2013: Sheffield Sharks

Coaching
- 2008–present: Sheffield Sharks

Career highlights
- 3x BBL Cup champion (2007, 2010, 2011)

Atiba Lyons (born July 30, 1982) is an American retired basketball player and current coach. Lyons played in Finland, Israel and England during his professional career. In 2008, he was named head coach of Sheffield Sharks while still playing for the club, as Lyons combined playing and coaching.

== Business ==
Lyons became a company director in 2010 by the acquisition of shares of Sharks Basketball Ltd and he is also a shareholder of the development company, Park Community Arena Ltd which broke ground in 2022 and opened on the 5th of October 2023.

Lyons' business interests extend beyond facilities reaching into the communities with a series of achievement programmes for disengaged youths.
