= Founders Hall (Pittsfield, Maine) =

- U.S. National Register of Historic Places
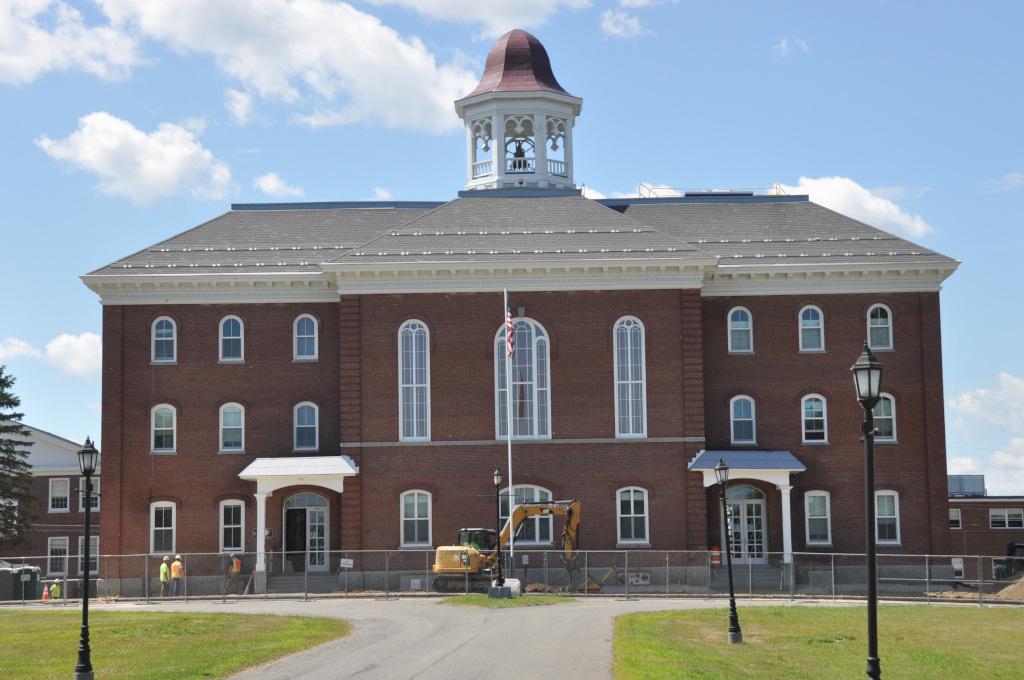

- Location within Maine Location within the United States
- Location: S. Main St., Pittsfield, Maine
- Coordinates: 44°46′46″N 69°23′14″W
- Area: 0.5 acres (0.20 ha)
- Built: 1868
- Architectural style: Italianate
- NRHP reference No.: 79000167
- Added to NRHP: October 9, 1979

Founders Hall is the oldest building standing on the campus of the Maine Central Institute, a private high school in Pittsfield, Maine. Built in 1868-77 (the school was founded in 1866), it is an Italianate building of unusual architectural sophistication for rural Maine. The building was listed on the National Register of Historic Places in 1979. It is the centerpiece of the school's campus, housing classrooms, offices, and other facilities.

== Description and history ==
Founders Hall is the centerpiece of the campus of the Maine Central Institute, located on the west side of Main Street in Pittsfield, Maine. It is a three-story brick structure, with a hip roof and a granite foundation. The cornice line below the roof is decorated with modillions. The hip roof is flattened at the center, and is topped by an open octagonal belfry with a bellcast roof. The front facade has a central projecting section, with quoined corners and single-story porches on either side that shelter its entrances. The upper windows on the projection are tall composites with round-arch elements. Fenestration elsewhere consists of segmented-arch sashes on the first level, and round-arch windows above.

The Maine Central Institute was founded in 1866 by Free Will Baptists as a private academy intended to supply students to Bates College. Construction of this, its first building, taking place over a ten-year period beginning in 1868. The building now houses, in addition to classrooms, offices and a ballet studio, as well as the school's rifle range in its basement.

== See also ==
- National Register of Historic Places listings in Somerset County, Maine
