= Mike Bernard (basketball) =

British basketball player and coach

- Bernard with Basket Rimini Crabs in 2009

Personal information
- Born: 14 July 1978 (age 48) Manchester, England
- Listed height: 206 cm (6 ft 9 in)
- Listed weight: 110 kg (243 lb)

Career information
- College: Coffeyville CC (1998–2000); South Florida (2000–2002)
- NBA draft: 2002: undrafted
- Playing career: 1994–2017
- Position: Center
- Coaching career: 2015–present

Career history
- 1994–1998: Manchester Giants
- 2002–2003: Panionios
- 2003: Pallacanestro Messina
- 2003–2004: Oregon Scientific Cantù
- 2004–2005: EWE Baskets Oldenburg
- 2005: Orlandina
- 2005–2007: Navigo.it / Siviglia Wear Teramo
- 2007: ČEZ Nymburk
- 2007–2008: Eldo Basket Napoli
- 2008: Aspis APOEL
- 2009: Étendard de Brest
- 2009–2010: Riviera Solare
- 2010–2012: Patrioti Levice
- 2012–2015: Manchester Giants
- 2015–2017: Lancashire Spinners

Career highlights
- SBL champion (2011)

Michael Bernard (born 14 July 1978) is a British basketball coach and former professional player. He played college basketball in the United States for the Coffeyville Red Ravens and South Florida Bulls. Bernard played professionally in the United Kingdom, Italy, France, Germany, Cyprus, the Czech Republic and Slovakia. He won a Slovak Basketball League championship with BK Patrioti Levice in 2011. Bernard has coached in the basketball academy of Myerscough College since 2015.

== Early life ==
Bernard was born in Manchester. He debuted for the Manchester Giants of the British Basketball League (BBL) in 1994. Bernard was named the English Junior National Player of the Year in 1996.

== College career ==
Bernard started his college basketball career at Coffeyville Community College. He struggled with ankle injuries during the 1998–99 season and averaged eight points per game. On November 10, 1999, Bernard signed to play for the South Florida Bulls, making the decision because of his relationship with assistant coach Clyde Vaughn who he knew from playing in England.

Bernard debuted for the Bulls during the 2000–01 season and played sparingly while he adjusted to NCAA Division I basketball. He was forced to sit out the first eight games of the 2001–02 season because he played at the professional level in England for the Giants despite not being paid. He became eligible in December 2001 and was regarded by Bulls head coach Seth Greenberg as being "the most physically intimidating" member of the team.

== Professional playing career ==
Bernard played in Italy, France, Germany, Cyprus and the Czech Republic. He won a Slovak Basketball League championship with BK Patrioti Levice in 2011. In 2012, he returned to the revived Manchester Giants on their entry to the BBL. Bernard spent three seasons with the Giants and then joined the Lancashire Spinners in 2015.

== Coaching career ==
On 15 June 2015, Bernard was announced as a member of the coaching staff at Myerscough College Basketball Academy. In 2018, he was appointed as head coach of the girls team. Bernard aided in the development of Amari Williams who was drafted into the National Basketball Association (NBA) in 2025.

== Personal life ==
Bernard was awarded an honorary fellowship by Myerscough College in 2015 "in recognition of his outstanding contribution to British basketball."
