= Zoltán Supola (basketball) =

Hungarian basketball player

No. 10 – Soproni KC
- Position: Point guard / shooting guard
- League: NB I/A

Personal information
- Born: 11 February 1988 (age 37) Budapest, Hungary
- Listed height: 1.93 m (6 ft 4 in)
- Listed weight: 87 kg (192 lb)

Career information
- College: Leeds Metropolitan University
- Playing career: 2007–present

Career history
- 2007–2011: Leeds Carnegie
- 2011–2016: Alba Fehérvár
- 2016–2018: PVSK Panthers
- 2018–present: Soproni KC

Zoltán Supola (born 11 February 1988) is a Hungarian professional basketball player. He is a combo guard for Soproni KC in Hungary. He was selected to play at the U16s, U18s and U20s European Championships. Previously, he played for Leeds Carnegie in the United Kingdom. He was awarded Hungarian Youth Player of the Year in 2007.

He averaged 16.8 points per game in the 2010/2011 season in EBL Division 1. He led his team with 24 points in their overtime victory over Bristol Academy Flyers in the semi-final. He led all scorers with 22 points in the Division 1 National Final against Reading Rockets but Leeds Carnegie came up short in the end.
