= Maine Central Institute =

Location
- Pittsfield, Maine 04967; United States; 44°46′46″N 69°23′13″W

Information
- Type: Private, Boarding
- Motto: Certum Pete Finem (Aim for a sure end)
- Established: 1866; 160 years ago
- Head of school: David Pearson
- Faculty: 65
- Enrollment: 430 total 95 boarding 335 day
- Average class size: 15 students
- Student to teacher ratio: 9:1
- Campus size: 50 acres (20 ha)
- Campus type: Suburban
- Colors: Maroon and White
- Athletics: 22 sports
- Athletics conference: New England Prep School Athletic Conference (NEPSAC) and Little Ten Conference, class B, KVAC class B
- Mascot: Huskies
- Website: www.mci-school.org

Maine Central Institute (MCI) is an independent high school in Pittsfield, Maine, United States that was established in 1866. The school enrolls approximately 430 students and is a nonsectarian institution. The school has both boarding and day students.

== History ==
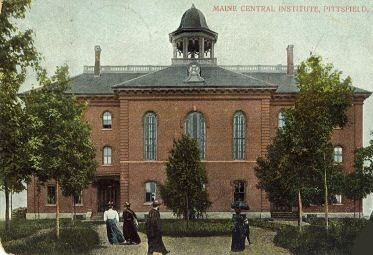
Founders Hall is the oldest campus building, completed in 1869

The Maine Central Institute was founded in 1866 by Rev. Oren B. Cheney and Rev. Ebenezer Knowlton, abolitionists who also founded Bates College in nearby Lewiston, Maine. The Maine State Seminary, originally part of Bates, served as a college preparatory school until it was dissolved in the late 1860s, and MCI (along with the Nichols Latin School in Lewiston) largely took the Seminary's place as a feeder school for Bates. The school was at its inception affiliated with the Free Will Baptists but is officially non-sectarian today.

The first building, the Institute Building (Founders Hall), was completed in 1869 and served as the primary campus building until 1958. In 1882 an early case involving the school was appealed to the Maine Supreme Judicial Court. The campus has expanded greatly over the past 140 years, and became officially coeducational in 1903 with the purchase of a boarding house from Benjamin Bowden and the construction of a second floor making it Ceder Croft Hall, which in 1927 burned down during a Christmas break. Immediately after, a fundraising campaign initiated by MCI alumni began with the intention to rebuild a residence hall. The dorm was completed in October 1928 and named Alumni Hall after the generous efforts from alumni. Due to World War I increasing enrollment in 1911 it became necessary to erect a female dormitory. The building today called Weymouth Hall houses the offices of Athletics and Activities, the dean of students and the dean of residential life, as well as the television studio (WMCI), the Health and Wellness Center, the Campus Bookstore, the Student Union, and classrooms for MCI's prestigious ESL (English as a Second Language) program.

Two athletic buildings have been built—Parks Gymnasium (still standing) which was finished in 1936 due to the MCI students' increased interest in athletics and in 1988 the construction of Wright Gymnasium which houses many of MCI's trophies and recognitions and a state of the art weight room and basketball court. The John W. Manson house was donated in 1944; since that date, it has been the residence of the head of school.

In 1950 the William H. Powell Memorial Library was constructed with the donations of Ella Powell in the name of her late husband, Judge William H. Powell. Today the Powell library has over 8,000 nonfiction books, academic subscriptions, and a seminar room dedicated to the original donor of the library Ella Powell. Shortly after the construction of the Powell Library, the Cianchette Science building was erected in name of Joseph R. Cianchette a main financial contributor. In the 1960s two dormitories were built to supplement the increase in postgraduate students and their need for housing. Those buildings are currently named Rowe Hall (constructed in 1961) and Manson Hall (constructed in 1966). Today there are a total of three main residence halls, two male and one female. Rowe Hall and Manson Hall (both male) are under the supervision of Mrs. Megan Thompson and Alumni Hall (female) is under the supervision of Mrs. Dana Fehnel, additional faculty and staff live in apartments on the different floors of the residence halls.

In 2000, work on the Chuck and Helen Cianchette Math and Science Center was finished. This building houses state of the art science labs and classrooms. The Math and Science Center is a 23,000-square-foot recent facility, including fifteen instructional spaces, classrooms which prepare students for the on-campus SAT/TOEFL exams, a 3D printing lab, along with physics, biology, and chemistry labs. Maine Central Institute also has nearby greenhouses and garden spaces for science classes and clubs.

The Student Center at Maine Central Institute includes a 250-seat dining room, outdoor patio area, recreation/game room, student lounge with performance stage area, 40-seat conference room, renovated kitchen, and serving area. The Student Center is attached to Rowe Hall and is a location for school functions, alumni and community group gatherings, and various student group activities.

== MCI traditions ==
One of the longest-running traditions at MCI is the Manson Essay contest which dates back to 1871. This competition which has happened annually for more than 145 years has evolved into a competition between the entire junior class in which they need to complete a university-level research paper and then give a speech on the topic. Only a select few are given the title of "Manson Essay Finalists" and then have to perform their speeches in front of the community at the Annual Manson Essay Contest. Only one will achieve the coveted title of "Manson Essayist".

== Notable alumni ==
- Erick Barkley, professional basketball player
- Etdrick Bohannon, professional basketball player
- Caron Butler, professional basketball player
- Sam Cassell, retired professional basketball player
- Barry Clifford, underwater explorer
- Kenny Hasbrouck, professional basketball player
- Henri J. Haskell, First Attorney General of Montana
- Dave Johnson, professional basketball player
- DerMarr Johnson, professional basketball player
- Jai Lewis, professional basketball player
- Brad Miller, professional basketball player
- Orrin Larrabee Miller, U.S. Congressman from Kansas
- Cuttino Mobley, professional basketball player
- Mamadou N'diaye, professional basketball player
- Roy E. Lindquist, decorated U.S. Army Major General
- Jaime Peterson, professional basketball player
- Bob Pickett, college football head coach
- Tim Rollins, arts educator
- Mike Tuck, Canadian-British semi-professional basketball player

== See also ==
- Bates College
- Bossov Ballet Theatre
- Education in Maine
- Lapham Institute
- Parsonsfield Seminary
- Pittsfield, Maine
- Storer College

== Sources ==
- Anthony, Alfred Williams, Bates College and Its Background, (Philadelphia: Judson Press, 1936).
- MCI website
