= 2015–16 British Basketball League season =

2015–16 BBL season
- League: British Basketball League
- Sport: Basketball
- Season MVP: Rahmon Fletcher
- BBL Cup champions: Newcastle Eagles
- BBL Cup runners-up: Leicester Riders

BBL seasons
- ← 2014–15 2016–17 →

The 2015–16 BBL season was the 29th campaign of the British Basketball League since the league's establishment in 1987. The season featured 12 teams from across England and Scotland.

== Teams ==
Locations of the 2015–16 BBL teams

| Team | City | Arena | Capacity | Last season |
|---|---|---|---|---|
| Bristol Flyers | Bristol | SGS WISE Arena | 750 | 8th |
| Cheshire Phoenix | Chester | Northgate Arena | 1,000 | 4th |
| Glasgow Rocks | Glasgow | Emirates Arena | 6,500 | 5th |
| Leeds Force | Leeds | Carnegie Sports Centre | 500 | 11th |
| Leicester Riders | Leicester | Sir David Wallace Centre; Leicester Arena | 1,000; 2,400 | 2nd |
| London Lions | London | Copper Box | 7,000 | 6th |
| Manchester Giants | Manchester | Trafford Powerleague Arena | 1,100 | 9th |
| Newcastle Eagles | Newcastle upon Tyne | Sport Central | 3,000 | 1st |
| Plymouth Raiders | Plymouth | Plymouth Pavilions | 1,500 | 10th |
| Sheffield Sharks | Sheffield | English Institute of Sport | 1,000 | 7th |
| Surrey Scorchers | Guildford | Surrey Sports Park | 1,000 | 13th |
| Worcester Wolves | Worcester | Worcester Arena | 2,000 | 3rd |

== Championship ==
=== Regular season ===
==== Standings ====
| Pos | Team | Pld | W | L | PF | PA | PD | Pts | Qualification |
|---|---|---|---|---|---|---|---|---|---|
| 1 | Leicester Riders | 33 | 29 | 4 | 2690 | 2239 | +451 | 58 | Qualification to playoffs |
| 2 | Newcastle Eagles | 33 | 28 | 5 | 3025 | 2584 | +441 | 56 | Qualification to playoffs |
| 3 | Sheffield Sharks | 33 | 20 | 13 | 2709 | 2473 | +236 | 40 | Qualification to playoffs |
| 4 | Worcester Wolves | 33 | 19 | 14 | 2722 | 2690 | +32 | 38 | Qualification to playoffs |
| 5 | Glasgow Rocks | 33 | 19 | 14 | 2605 | 2550 | +55 | 38 | Qualification to playoffs |
| 6 | London Lions | 33 | 16 | 17 | 2671 | 2537 | +134 | 32 | Qualification to playoffs |
| 7 | Cheshire Phoenix | 33 | 16 | 17 | 2769 | 2792 | −23 | 32 | Qualification to playoffs |
| 8 | Leeds Force | 33 | 14 | 19 | 2372 | 2610 | −238 | 28 | Qualification to playoffs |
| 9 | Plymouth Raiders | 33 | 13 | 20 | 2698 | 2784 | −86 | 26 | |
| 10 | Bristol Flyers | 33 | 9 | 24 | 2323 | 2582 | −259 | 18 | |
| 11 | Manchester Giants | 33 | 8 | 25 | 2558 | 2882 | −324 | 16 | |
| 12 | Surrey Scorchers | 33 | 7 | 26 | 2493 | 2912 | −419 | 14 | |

Source: BBL

== Playoffs ==
=== Bracket ===
Quarter-finals
1 | Leicester Riders | 83 | 75 | 158
8 | Leeds Force | 78 | 55 | 133
2 | Newcastle Eagles | 91 | 96 | 187
7 | Cheshire Phoenix | 104 | 87 | 191
3 | Sheffield Sharks | 94 | 75 | 169
6 | London Lions | 70 | 78 | 158
4 | Worcester Wolves | 53 | 88 | 141
5 | Glasgow Rocks | 90 | 83 | 173

Semi-finals
1 | Leicester Riders | 99 | 84 | 183
7 | Cheshire Phoenix | 55 | 92 | 147
5 | Glasgow Rocks | 80 | 73 | 153
3 | Sheffield Sharks | 91 | 68 | 159

Final
1 | Leicester Riders | 77
3 | Sheffield Sharks | 84

==== Quarter-finals ====
(1) Leicester Riders vs. (8) Leeds Force

22 April 2016

| Leeds Force | 78–83 | Leicester Riders |

Carnegie Sports Arena, Headingley

23 April 2016

| Leicester Riders | 75–55 | Leeds Force |
Leicester win 158–133 on aggregate.

Leicester Arena, Leicester

(2) Newcastle Eagles vs. (7) Cheshire Phoenix

22 April 2016

| Newcastle Eagles | 91–104 | Cheshire Phoenix |

Sport Central, Newcastle upon Tyne

24 April 2016

| Cheshire Phoenix | 87–96 | Newcastle Eagles |
Cheshire win 191–187 on aggregate.

Cheshire Oaks Arena, Ellesmere Port

(3) Sheffield Sharks vs. (6) London Lions

22 April 2016

| Sheffield Sharks | 94–70 | London Lions |

English Institute of Sport, Sheffield

24 April 2016

| London Lions | 78–75 | Sheffield Sharks |
Sheffield win 169–148 on aggregate.

Copper Box, London

(4) Worcester Wolves vs. (5) Glasgow Rocks

22 April 2015

| Glasgow Rocks | 90–53 | Worcester Wolves |

Emirates Arena, Glasgow

24 April 2015

| Worcester Wolves | 88–83 | Glasgow Rocks |
Glasgow win 173–141 on aggregate.

University of Worcester Arena, Worcester

==== Semi-finals ====
(1) Leicester Riders vs. (7) Cheshire Phoenix

30 April 2016

| Cheshire Phoenix | 55–99 | Leicester Riders |

Cheshire Oaks Arena, Ellesmere Port

1 May 2016

| Leicester Riders | 84–92 | Cheshire Phoenix |
Leicester win 183–147 on aggregate.

Leicester Arena, Leicester

(3) Sheffield Sharks vs. (5) Glasgow Rocks

29 April 2016

| Glasgow Rocks | 80–91 | Sheffield Sharks |

Emirates Arena, Glasgow

1 May 2016

| Sheffield Sharks | 68–73 | Glasgow Rocks |
Sheffield win 159–153 on aggregate.

English Institute of Sport, Sheffield

==== Final ====
8 May 2016
15:30 GMT

| Leicester Riders | 77–84 | Sheffield Sharks |
Scoring by quarter: 22-18, 21-26, 23-15, 11-25
| Pts: Neil Watson (19); Rebs: TrayVonn Wright, Tyler Bernardini (6); Asts: Neil Watson (4) | | Pts: Mike Tuck (20); Rebs: Mike Tuck (13); Asts: Brandon Hogg (6) |

The O2, London

== BBL Cup ==
=== 1st Round ===
| Sheffield Sharks | 82–77 | Manchester Giants |

| Plymouth Raiders | 77–88 | Bristol Flyers |

| Surrey Scorchers | 81–89 | London Lions |

| Glasgow Rocks | 84–65 | Leeds Force |

=== Quarter-finals ===
| Newcastle Eagles | 83–78 | Glasgow Rocks |

| Worcester Wolves | 70–77 | London Lions |

| Leicester Riders | 62–60 | Sheffield Sharks |

| Cheshire Phoenix | 72–60 | Bristol Flyers |

=== Semi-finals ===
| London Lions | 65–77 | Leicester Riders |

| Leicester Riders | 75–65 | London Lions |
Leicester win 152-130

| Cheshire Phoenix | 85–113 | Newcastle Eagles |

| Newcastle Eagles | 100–96 | Cheshire Phoenix |
Newcastle win 213-181

=== Final ===
17 Jan 2016
15:30 GMT

| Newcastle Eagles | 94–82 | Leicester Riders |

Arena Birmingham, Birmingham

== BBL Trophy ==
=== 1st Round ===
| Leeds Force | 67–70 | Cheshire Phoenix |

| London Lions | 50–71 | Leicester Riders |

| Falkirk Fury | 42–91 | Glasgow Rocks |

| Essex Leopards | 60–102 | Plymouth Raiders |

| Bristol Flyers | 76–83 | Worcester Wolves |

| Derby Trailblazers | 67–84 | Sheffield Sharks |

| Manchester Giants | 75–91 | Newcastle Eagles |

| Reading Rockets | 72–82 | Surrey Scorchers |

=== Quarter-finals ===
| Cheshire Phoenix | 87–97 | Newcastle Eagles |

| Leicester Riders | 77–60 | Surrey Scorchers |

| Plymouth Raiders | 73–99 | Sheffield Sharks |

| Worcester Wolves | 85–66 | Glasgow Rocks |

=== Semi-finals ===
| Newcastle Eagles | 73–66 | Worcester Wolves |

| Worcester Wolves | 88–94 | Newcastle Eagles |
Newcastle win 167-154

| Leicester Riders | 79–79 | Sheffield Sharks |

| Sheffield Sharks | 70–74 | Leicester Riders |
Leicester win 153-149

=== Final ===
27 Feb 2016
15:30 GMT

| Newcastle Eagles | 77–85 | Leicester Riders |
Scoring by quarter: 17-20, 13-22, 20-16, 27-27
| Pts: Rahmon Fletcher (18); Rebs: Charles Smith (9); Asts: Scott Martin (5) | | Pts: Andrew Sullivan (22); Rebs: TrayVonn Wright, Tyler Bernardini (9); Asts: Conner Washington (4) |

Emirates Arena, Glasgow

| Preceded by 2014–15 season | BBL seasons 2015–16 | Succeeded by 2016–17 season |
