= Sheffield Sharks =

British professional basketball team

- League: SLB
- Established: 1991; 35 years ago
- History: Sheffield Forgers (1991–1994); Sheffield Sharks (1994–present)
- Arena: Canon Medical Arena
- Capacity: 2,500
- Location: Sheffield, South Yorkshire
- Team colours: Navy blue, yellow, silver grey, white
- Main sponsor: B. Braun
- Head coach: Atiba Lyons
- Championships: 1 SLB Cup; 4 BBL Championship; 2 BBL Playoffs; 3 BBL Cup; 2 BBL Trophy
- Website: Official website

The Sheffield Sharks are an English professional basketball team based in Sheffield, South Yorkshire. The Sharks compete in the Super League Basketball and play their home matches at Park Community Arena, which opened in 2023. They are one of the most successful teams in the history of British basketball and dominated domestic competitions throughout the 1990s and early 2000s. They are currently known as B.Braun Sheffield Sharks for sponsorship reasons.

== History ==
=== Sheffield Forgers ===
The club was established in 1991 when the team, then called the Sheffield Forgers in reference to the city's history as a major steel producer, were admitted to National Basketball League Division 2. After two seasons competing in the division, with an overall 26–16 record, the Forgers were crowned Champions in 1993 and promoted to NBL Division 1. The 1993–1994 season would prove to be another successful one for the Forgers having reached the National Trophy final where they beat Plymouth Raiders 62–60 on "home" territory at the Sheffield Arena. Their stay in the First Division did not last long, and although they finished in 4th position with a 10–8 record, the Forgers were admitted to the professional top-tier British Basketball League as a new franchise to replace the withdrawing Guildford Kings.

=== Rebranding as the Sharks ===
The club was purchased by the Chrysalis Group in 1994 and rebranded as Sheffield Sharks. On court, the team dominated the league in its rookie season, and with a 29–7 league record, marched on to take the BBL League Championship and National Cup with an incredible 89–66 victory in the final against Thames Valley Tigers. However the Tigers got their revenge over the Sharks with a nail-biting 74–69 win in the BBL Trophy final. The Sharks also missed out on the playoff final following a 72–84 loss to Worthing Bears in the Final Four, despite this the Sheffield team still enjoyed a phenomenal debut season.

=== European leagues ===
Former Sharks logo

In 1995, the 1995 McDonald's Championship came to London and the Sharks were entered as the host team, mixing with the elite of world basketball including the NBA's Houston Rockets, Spanish League giants Real Madrid and Bologna of the Italian League amongst others. Sheffield finished the series 0–2, following defeats to Real Madrid and Maccabi Tel Aviv.

Sharks' adventure continued into Europe in the following season (1995–96) when they competed in the prestigious Euroleague. After knocking out Luxembourg-based team Residence Helmsange in the qualifying round, the Sharks were then eliminated in the first round by Real Madrid after a 57–67 defeat in Sheffield and a 75–78 defeat in Madrid. As a result of losing, Sheffield were then placed in the Third Round of the less glamorous European Cup, where they were subsequently knocked out by Belgian League club Oostende Basket, thus ending their European adventure.

On the domestic scene, the Sharks could not repeat the highs of their previous season, finishing as Runners-up in the League Championship (30–6) to London Towers, and losing the final of the National Cup 58–70 also to the dominating Towers. Their playoff dreams were also shattered in the semifinals by eventual winners Birmingham Bullets, whom they lost to 68–82.

=== Golden era ===
The Sharks again reached the BBL Cup final in 1996 and 1997, finishing second then third in the championship, and their next piece of silverware was the 1998 BBL Trophy. They claimed their second BBL Cup and championship double in 1999, with Terrell Myers picked as League MVP, before successfully defending the Cup in 2000 after reaching their fifth Cup final in six years. It was during the most successful period of the clubs’ history that owners Chrysalis Group decided to sell off their majority stake. After running into off-court financial difficulties and on the brink of a wind-up order from the BBL, the franchise was acquired by Montgomery Leisure Services Ltd in 2001, the same year that a first Play-off final appearance was secured in after topping the championship. However it was Leicester Riders who triumphed 84–75, and the Sharks were beaten again in the play-off final the following year, 93–82 by Cheshire Jets. The Sharks claimed their third Championship in five years in 2003 and although they failed to reach the play-off final, they got there the following year after a second-placed league finish. It was the Sharks' third playoff final in four years and a case of third time lucky as they beat Cheshire 86–74.

=== Modern era ===
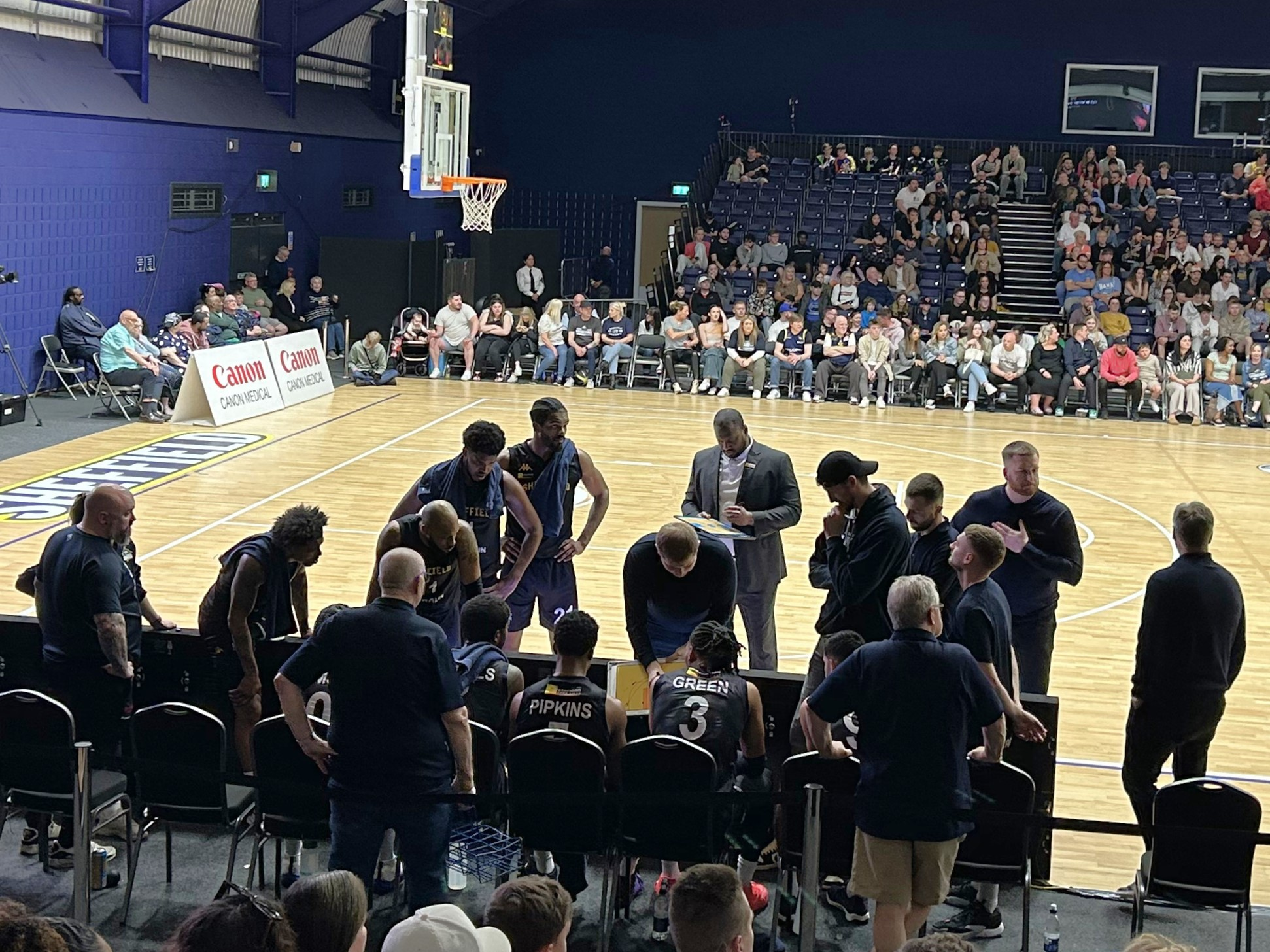
Sharks players and support staff during a time-out in a game against the Leicester Sharks in May 2024

In the 2009–2010 season, Sheffield won the BBL Cup for the first time in six years beating the Cheshire Jets 89–86. During the 2010–2011 season, they successfully defended their cup victory by beating the Mersey Tigers 93–66 and also made it to the final of the playoffs but were beaten out by Mersey Tigers 79–74. In the 2012–2013 season, the Sharks won the BBL Trophy for the first time in 15 years beating the Leicester Riders 71–69. In the 2015–2016 season, Sheffield made it to the Play Off final for the first time in five years. This time however, for the first time in 12 years the Sharks in the final of the playoffs on 8 May 2016, beat Leicester Riders 84–77. The Sharks most recently won the 2024-2025 Super League Basketball (SLB) Cup against the Surrey 89ers 105-97, winning silverware for the first time in 9 years.

== Home arenas ==
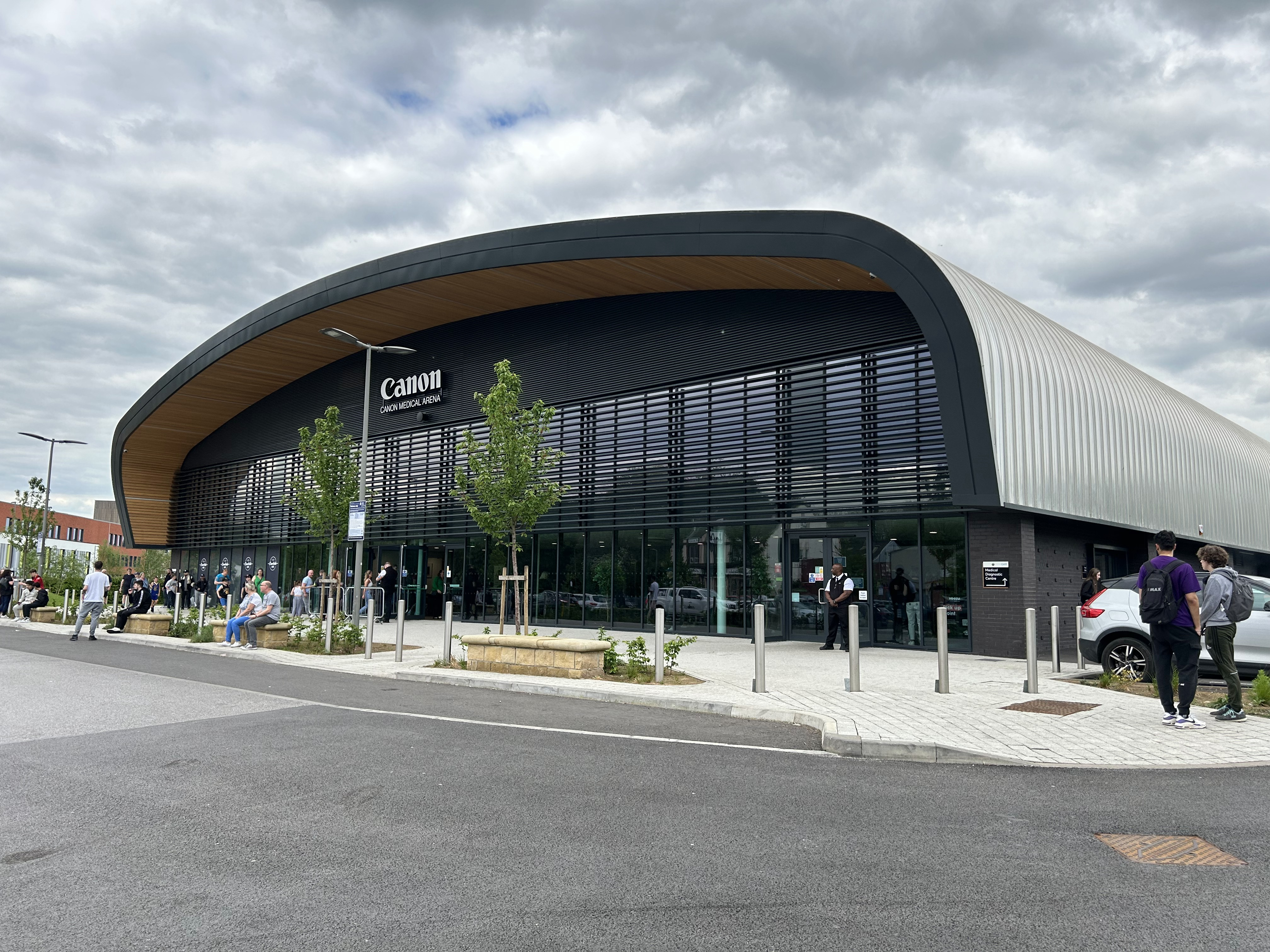
The Canon Medical Arena, home arena of the Sharks since 2023

Sheffield Arena (1994–2004)
Ponds Forge International Sports Centre (2004–2006)
English Institute of Sport, Sheffield (2006–2019)
Ponds Forge International Sports Centre (2019–2023)
Canon Medical Arena (2023–present)

== Season-by-season records ==
Seasons 1991–2024
Season	Division	Tier	Regular Season						Post-Season	Trophy	Cup	Head coach
Season	Division	Tier	Finish	Played 25	Wins 18	Losses7	Points	Win %	Post-Season	Trophy	Cup	Head coach
Sheffield Forgers
1991–92	NBL3	3	5th	22	11	11	22	0.500				
1992–93	NBL3	3	1st	20	15	5	30	0.750				
1993–94	NBL1	2	4th	18	10	8	20	0.556				
Sheffield Sharks
1994–95	BBL	1	1st	36	29	7	58	0.806	Semi Final	Runner-Up	Winners, beating Thames Valley	Jim Brandon
1995–96	BBL	1	2nd	36	30	6	60	0.833	Semi Final	Semi Final	Runner-Up	Jim Brandon
1996–97	BBL	1	3rd	36	26	10	52	0.722	Semi Final	Semi Final	Runner-Up	Jim Brandon
1997–98	BBL	1	4th	36	25	11	50	0.694	Quarter Final	Winners, beating Towers	Quarter Final	Chris Finch
1998–99	BBL	1	1st	36	31	5	62	0.861	Semi Final	Semi Final	Winners, beating Leopards	Chris Finch
1999–00	BBL N	1	2nd	36	29	7	58	0.806	Quarter Final	Semi Final	Winners, beating Manchester	Chris Finch
2000–01	BBL N	1	1st	36	27	9	54	0.750	Runner-Up	Semi Final	1st Round	Chris Finch
2001–02	BBL N	1	2nd	32	21	11	42	0.656	Runner-Up	Quarter Final	Semi Final	Chris Finch
2002–03	BBL	1	1st	40	33	7	66	0.825	Semi Final	1st Round	1st Round	Chris Finch
2003–04	BBL	1	2nd	36	26	10	52	0.722	Winners, beating Chester	1st Round	Winners, beating Scottish	Peter Scantlebury
2004–05	BBL	1	4th	40	26	14	52	0.650	Semi Final	1st Round	Quarter Final	Peter Scantlebury
2005–06	BBL	1	3rd	40	26	14	52	0.650	Semi Final	1st Round	Quarter Final	Peter Scantlebury
2006–07	BBL	1	2nd	36	28	8	56	0.778	Semi Final	Semi Final	Semi Final	Peter Scantlebury
2007–08	BBL	1	6th	33	17	16	34	0.515	Quarter Final	1st Round	Quarter Final	Peter Scantlebury
2008–09	BBL	1	6th	33	16	17	32	0.485	Quarter Final	1st Round	Quarter Final	Atiba Lyons
2009–10	BBL	1	2nd	36	30	6	60	0.833	Semi Final	1st Round	Winners, beating Cheshire	Atiba Lyons
2010–11	BBL	1	3rd	33	24	9	48	0.727	Runner-Up	1st Round	Winners, beating Mersey	Atiba Lyons
2011–12	BBL	1	7th	30	13	17	26	0.433	Quarter Final	Semi Final	Quarter Final	Atiba Lyons
2012–13	BBL	1	7th	33	17	16	34	0.515	Quarter Finals	Winners, beating Leicester	Semi Finals	Atiba Lyons
2013–14	BBL	1	2nd	33	27	6	54	0.818	Semi Finals	Semi Finals	Semi Finals	Atiba Lyons
2014–15	BBL	1	7th	36	19	17	38	0.528	Semi Finals	Quarter Finals	Semi Finals	Atiba Lyons
2015–16	BBL	1	3rd	33	20	13	40	0.606	Winners, beating Leicester	Semi Finals	Quarter Finals	Atiba Lyons
2016–17	BBL	1	4th	33	20	13	40	0.606	Quarter Finals	1st Round	Quarter Finals	Atiba Lyons
2017–18	BBL	1	8th	33	18	15	36	0.545	Quarter Finals	Runner Up	Semi Finals	Atiba Lyons
2018–19	BBL	1	6th	33	17	16	34	0.515	Semi Finals	1st Round	1st Round	Atiba Lyons
2019–20	BBL	1	Season cancelled due to COVID-19 pandemic							Quarter Finals	Quarter Finals	Atiba Lyons
2020–21	BBL	1	5th	30	15	15	30	0.500	Quarter Finals	1st Round	Pool Stage	Atiba Lyons
2021–22	BBL	1	2nd	27	17	10	34	0.630	Quarter Finals	1st Round	Quarter-finals	Atiba Lyons
2022–23	BBL	1	7th	36	17	19	34	0.472	Quarter Finals	Semi Finals	Quarter Finals	Atiba Lyons
2023–24	BBL	1	4th	36	19	17	38	0.528	Semi Finals	Pool Stage		Atiba Lyons

=== SLB season-by-season ===
Champions	SLB champions	Runners-up	Playoff berth

Season	Tier	League	Regular season					Postseason	Cup	Trophy	Head coach
Season	Tier	League	Finish	Played	Wins	Losses	Win %	Postseason	Cup	Trophy	Head coach
Sheffield Sharks
2024–25	1	SLB	3rd	32	22	10	.688	Semifinal	Champions	Did not qualify	Atiba Lyons
2025–26	1	SLB	4th	32	16	16	.500	Quarterfinals	Quarterfinals	Did not qualify	Atiba Lyons
Championship record				64	38	26	.594	0 championships			
Playoff record				6	3	3	.500	0 playoff championships			

=== TBT ===
==== 2025 ====
Date	Round	Location	Score	Opponent
July 19	First round	Kansas City, Missouri	70–64	DaGuys STL
July 21	Second round	Kansas City, Missouri	70–89	Heartfire

Notes:

- Until 1993 Division Three operated as the third tier league, behind Division Two and Division One (the BBL).
- In 1993 the NBL restructured Division Two as Division One, operating as the second tier league.
- From 1999–2002 the BBL operated a Conference system. Sheffield competed in the Northern Conference.

== Trophies ==
=== League ===
- BBL Winners: (3) 1994/95, 1998/99, 2002/03
- BBL Runners Up: (4) 1995/96, 2003/04, 2009/10, 2013/14
- BBL Northern Conference Winners: (1) 2000/01
- BBL Northern Conference Runners Up: (2) 1999/00, 2001/02
- NBL Division 2 Winners: (1) 1992/93

=== Playoffs ===
- BBL Play Off Winners: (2) 2003/04, 2015/16
- BBL Play Off Runners Up: (3) 2000/01, 2001/02, 2010/11
- NBL Division 2 Play Off Winners: (1) 1992/93

=== Cup ===
- SLB Cup Winners: (1) 2024/25
- BBL Cup Winners: (3) 2003/04, 2009/10, 2010/11
- National Cup Winners: (3) 1994/95, 1998/99, 1999/00

=== Trophy ===
- BBL Trophy Winners: (3) 1993/1994, 1997/1998, 2012/13
- BBL Trophy Runners Up: (2) 1994/95, 2017/18

== Players ==
=== Current roster ===
Note: Flags indicate national team eligibility at FIBA-sanctioned events. Players may hold other non-FIBA nationalities not displayed.

Sheffield Sharks roster
Players
Coaches

Pos.	No.	Nat.	Name	Ht.	Wt.
PG	0	(United States)	Brewer, Tevin	1.73 m (5 ft 8 in)	73 kg (161 lb)
SF	2	(Australia)	Bairstow, Sean	2.03 m (6 ft 8 in)	93 kg (205 lb)
SF	4	(United States)	Lee, William	2.06 m (6 ft 9 in)	93 kg (205 lb)
F	5	(United States)	Clay, Donovan	2.03 m (6 ft 8 in)	104 kg (229 lb)
G	9	(United States)	Ratinho, Jordan	1.96 m (6 ft 5 in)	95 kg (209 lb)
G	14	(United States)	Jack, Maceo	1.96 m (6 ft 5 in)	86 kg (190 lb)
PF	15	(United Kingdom)	Ochereobia, Mike	2.03 m (6 ft 8 in)	118 kg (260 lb)
PG	20	(United States)	Delph, Adrian	1.91 m (6 ft 3 in)	84 kg (185 lb)
PG	22	(United States)	Gherezgher, Dan	1.93 m (6 ft 4 in)	86 kg (190 lb)
F/C	25	(Bosnia and Herzegovina) (United Kingdom)	Alihodzic, Fahro	2.08 m (6 ft 10 in)	118 kg (260 lb)

Head coach

- (United States) Atiba Lyons

Assistant coach(es)

- (Serbia) Marko Backovic
- (Spain) David Martinez
- (United Kingdom) Owen Norfolk

Strength & conditioning coach(es)

- (United Kingdom) Joe Lane

Legend

- (C) Team captain
- Injured

=== Notable former players ===
- (United Kingdom) John Amaechi
- (United Kingdom) Olu Babalola
- (United Kingdom) Andrew Bridge
- (United Kingdom) Fabulous Flournoy
- (United Kingdom) Garnet Gayle
- (United Kingdom) Roger Huggins
- (United Kingdom) Nate Reinking
- (United Kingdom) Peter Scantlebury
- (United Kingdom) Voise Winters
- (United Kingdom) Mike Tuck
- (United States) Marshall Brown
- (United States) Jeff Bonds
- (United States) Todd Cauthorn
- (United States) Sterling Davis
- (United States) Chris Finch
- (United States) Terrell Myers
- (United States) Lynard Stewart
- (United States) Matt Krasnoff

== Reserve ("II") team ==
The Sharks also have a B team called Sheffield Sharks II. They currently play in the NBL Division 1 Pool A (3rd-tier of British basketball system).

Note: Flags indicate national team eligibility at FIBA-sanctioned events. Players may hold other non-FIBA nationalities not displayed.

Sheffield Sharks roster
Players
Coaches

Pos.	No.	Nat.	Name	Ht.	Wt.
C	1	(United Kingdom)	Baldwin, Oscar	2.08 m (6 ft 10 in)	91 kg (201 lb)
G	2	(United Kingdom)	Kom, Declan	1.85 m (6 ft 1 in)
G	3	(United Kingdom)	Skaines, Wesley
G	4	(United Kingdom)	Montgomery, Nate	1.80 m (5 ft 11 in)
G	7	(United Kingdom)	Wildie, Harrison
SG	5	(United Kingdom)	Days, Joel
SG	8	(United Kingdom)	Cousins, Gabriel
G	9	(United Kingdom)	Mccarthy, Owen
PG	10	(United Kingdom)	Hanson-Young, Sedale	1.87 m (6 ft 2 in)
C	13	(United Kingdom)	Holondo, Chadrak
PF	15	(United Kingdom)	Alexander, Courtney (British basketball player)
G/F	18	(United Kingdom)	Lister, Tyler
F/C	22	(United Kingdom)	Andrews, Charles (basketball player)
SF	31	(United Kingdom)	Moore, Miles (basketball player)
SF	34	(United Kingdom)	Johnstone, Callum	2.01 m (6 ft 7 in)
PG	47	(United Kingdom)	Norfolk, Owen
F	47	(Canada)	Tuck (basketball), Mike	2.01 m (6 ft 7 in)	104 kg (229 lb)

Head coach

- (United Kingdom) Owen Norfolk (coach-player)

Legend

- (C) Team captain
- Injured

== Ownership ==
- Yuri Matischen
- Sarah Backovic
- Atiba Lyons
- Vaughn Millette

== See also ==
- Basketball in England
- British Basketball League
- Euroleague
- National Basketball League
- Sheffield Arena
