= 2013–14 British Basketball League season =

2013–14 BBL season
- League: British Basketball League
- Sport: Basketball
- Duration: 27 September 2013 – 20 April 2014; 25 April 2014 – 11 May 2014 (Playoffs)
- Games: 33
- Teams: 12

Regular Season
- Top seed: Newcastle Eagles
- Season MVP: Zaire Taylor (Worcester Wolves)
- Top scorer: Victor Moses (Cheshire Phoenix)

BBL Tournaments
- BBL Playoffs champions: Worcester Wolves
- BBL Playoffs runners-up: Newcastle Eagles
- BBL Cup champions: Leicester Riders
- BBL Cup runners-up: Newcastle Eagles
- BBL Trophy champions: Worcester Wolves
- BBL Trophy runners-up: Glasgow Rocks

BBL seasons
- ← 2012–13 2014–15 →

The 2013–14 BBL season was the 27th campaign of the British Basketball League since the league's establishment in 1987. The season featured 12 teams from across England and Scotland, including new entrant Birmingham Knights. East London Royals and Essex Leopards were both due to become the 13th and 14th League members respectively, but after deferring their original entries from the 2012–13 season for a season, both franchises withdrew their applications to join the BBL due to financial constraints.

On 12 July it was officially announced that the Mersey Tigers franchise had been withdrawn from the up-coming season by the League due to financial trouble that had plagued the club throughout the previous season, which resulted in the Tigers becoming the first club to complete an entire season without a single victory.

The season started on 27 September 2013 and ended on 11 May 2014 with the Play-off Final at Wembley Arena. Newcastle Eagles claimed a record 6th regular season title but were defeated in the Play-off Final by a dominant Worcester Wolves team who were also victorious in the BBL Trophy, beating Glasgow Rocks on their home court in the Final. Leicester Riders were crowned as the BBL Cup winners, defeating Newcastle in the Final at the National Indoor Arena.

== Teams ==
Locations of the 2013–14 BBL teams

| Team | City | Arena | Capacity | Last season |
|---|---|---|---|---|
| Birmingham Knights | Birmingham | North Solihull Sports Centre | 600 | New |
| Cheshire Phoenix | Chester | Northgate Arena | 1,000 | 11th |
| Durham Wildcats | Newton Aycliffe | Newton Aycliffe Leisure Centre | 1,200 | 10th |
| Glasgow Rocks | Glasgow | Emirates Arena | 6,500 | 3rd |
| Leicester Riders | Leicester | John Sandford Centre | 800 | 1st |
| London Lions | London | Copper Box | 7,000 | 8th |
| Manchester Giants | Manchester | Wright Robinson College | 900 | 9th |
| Newcastle Eagles | Newcastle upon Tyne | Sport Central | 3,000 | 2nd |
| Plymouth Raiders | Plymouth | Plymouth Pavilions | 1,480 | 6th |
| Sheffield Sharks | Sheffield | English Institute of Sport | 1,200 | 7th |
| Surrey United | Guildford | Surrey Sports Park | 1,000 | 4th |
| Worcester Wolves | Worcester | Worcester Arena | 2,000 | 5th |

== Notable occurrences ==
- New entrant Birmingham Knights joined as the League's 13th franchise whilst East London Royals and Essex Leopards who were both due to become the 14th and 15th League members respectively, withdrew their applications to join the BBL due to financial constraints.
- Ed Percival was announced as the BBL's new chairman on 27 June 2013, replacing the outgoing Paul Blake who stepped down after nearly a decade in the position.
- On 12 July it was officially announced that the Mersey Tigers franchise had been withdrawn from the up-coming season by the League due to financial trouble that had plagued the club throughout the previous season, bringing the number of teams back down to 12.
- Following the sale of Surrey Heat to a partnership group consisting of Surrey Sports Park and London United, the franchise was subsequently rebranded as Surrey United prior to the start of the season. Due to the takeover, long-time head coach Creon Raftopolous was sacked and replaced by Jack Majewski.
- Durham Wildcats announced on 13 August that head coach Dave Elderkin had stepped down from the role after 8 years in charge. He was replaced by former Great Britain Women's Under-20 coach Lee Davie.
- On 7 September – just weeks before the start of the new season – Plymouth Raiders announced that head coach Gavin Love had been sacked following a 'vote of no confidence' from the club's board of directors. Former Raiders player Jay Marriott was appointed as his successor.
- The BBL announced a new television broadcasting deal with British Eurosport on 23 September, to complement the recently launched online BBL TV platform.
- A sell-out crowd saw Worcester Wolves win their first competitive game at their new venue, the Worcester Arena on 4 October, as the home side defeated reigning champions Leicester Riders 73–61.
- Worcester's 62–69 victory away to Leicester Riders on 16 November, put an end to Leicester's 34-game unbeaten home winning streak, which spanned over three seasons.
- Controversy surrounded Surrey head coach Jack Majewski and his decision to play star player Brandon McGill in a defeat to Cheshire Phoenix on 8 December, two days after the player suffered concussion following a clash with Darius Defoe in a game against Newcastle Eagles.
- On 12 January 2014, Leicester retained the BBL Cup after beating Newcastle Eagles in the Final at the National Indoor Arena for the second year running.
- Bristol Flyers became only the second-ever lower division team to beat BBL opposition and advance to the Quarter-finals of the BBL Trophy, following their 91–75 defeat of Surrey United on 16 January.
- Worcester Wolves claimed their first-ever BBL title with an 83–76 victory over Glasgow Rocks in the BBL Trophy Final on 30 March, in front of 5,000 people on Glasgow's home court, the Emirates Arena.
- London Lions' Joe Ikhinmwin won the annual BBL Slam Dunk Contest at Emirates Arena on 30 March.
- Leicester head coach Rob Paternostro and Sheffield Sharks head coach Atiba Lyons both reached a landmark 250th game at the helm of their respective clubs on the weekend of 5/6 April.
- The first ever competitive BBL game to be staged in Wales took place on 9 April between Cheshire Phoenix and Glasgow Rocks. The game was switched from Cheshire's usual home venue, the Northgate Arena, to the Deeside Leisure Centre in Queensferry, Flintshire due to availability issues. The "home" team lost 77–90 to the visiting Glasgow Rocks.
- Newcastle Eagles were crowned League Champions for a record sixth time following a 106–58 win away to Surrey, on 13 April.
- Durham Wildcats and the new Manchester Giants franchise (relaunched in 2012) both secured Play-off berths for the first time in their respective club history's following the conclusion of the regular season.
- Worcester Wolves claimed their second piece of silverware for the season by beating Newcastle in the Championship Play-off Final on 12 May, with a 90–78 victory at Wembley Arena. Wolves' Zaire Taylor was named as the game's Most Valuable Player.

== BBL Championship (Tier 1) ==
=== Final standings ===
| Pos | Team | Pld | W | L | % | Pts |
|---|---|---|---|---|---|---|
| 1 | Newcastle Eagles | 33 | 28 | 5 | 0.848 | 56 |
| 2 | Sheffield Sharks | 33 | 27 | 6 | 0.818 | 54 |
| 3 | Worcester Wolves | 33 | 27 | 6 | 0.818 | 54 |
| 4 | Leicester Riders | 33 | 23 | 10 | 0.697 | 46 |
| 5 | Cheshire Phoenix | 33 | 18 | 15 | 0.545 | 36 |
| 6 | London Lions | 33 | 16 | 17 | 0.484 | 32 |
| 7 | Manchester Giants | 33 | 14 | 19 | 0.424 | 28 |
| 8 | Durham Wildcats | 33 | 14 | 19 | 0.424 | 28 |
| 9 | Plymouth Raiders | 33 | 14 | 19 | 0.424 | 28 |
| 10 | Glasgow Rocks | 33 | 13 | 20 | 0.394 | 26 |
| 11 | Surrey United | 33 | 4 | 29 | 0.121 | 8 |
| 12 | Birmingham Knights | 33 | 0 | 33 | 0.000 | 0 |

| = League winners |
| = Qualified for the play-offs |

=== Playoffs ===
Quarter-finals
1 | Newcastle Eagles | 97 | 97 | 194
8 | Durham Wildcats | 75 | 82 | 157
4 | Leicester Riders | 88 | 77 | 164
5 | Cheshire Phoenix | 76 | 56 | 133
2 | Sheffield Sharks | 63 | 78 | 141
7 | Manchester Giants | 60 | 78 | 138
3 | Worcester Wolves | 92 | 86 | 178
6 | London Lions | 78 | 88 | 166

Semi-finals
1 | Newcastle Eagles | 79 | 83 (OT) | 162
4 | Leicester Riders | 90 | 71 | 161
2 | Sheffield Sharks | 59 | 60 | 119
3 | Worcester Wolves | 79 | 67 | 146

Final
1 | Newcastle Eagles
2 | Worcester Wolves

==== Quarter-finals ====
(1) Newcastle Eagles vs. (8) Durham Wildcats

25 April 2014

| Newcastle Eagles | 97–75 | Durham Wildcats |

Sport Central, Newcastle upon Tyne

27 April 2014

| Durham Wildcats | 82–97 | Newcastle Eagles |
Newcastle wins on aggregate, 194–157

Newton Aycliffe Leisure Centre, Newton Aycliffe

(2) Sheffield Sharks vs. (7) Manchester Giants

26 April 2014

| Manchester Giants | 60–63 | Sheffield Sharks |

Wright Robinson College, Manchester

27 April 2013

| Sheffield Sharks | 78–78 | Manchester Giants |
Sheffield wins on aggregate, 141–138

English Institute of Sport, Sheffield

(3) Worcester Wolves vs. (6) London Lions

25 April 2014

| London Lions | 78–92 | Worcester Wolves |

Copper Box, London

27 April 2014

| Worcester Wolves | 86–88 | London Lions |
Worcester wins on aggregate, 178–166

Worcester Arena, Worcester

(4) Leicester Riders vs. (5) Cheshire Phoenix

25 April 2014

| Cheshire Phoenix | 76–88 | Leicester Riders |

Northgate Arena, Chester

27 April 2014

| Leicester Riders | 77–56 | Cheshire Phoenix |
Leicester wins on aggregate, 164–133

Sir David Wallace Centre, Loughborough

==== Semi-finals ====
(1) Newcastle Eagles vs. (4) Leicester Riders

1 May 2014

| Leicester Riders | 90–79 | Newcastle Eagles |

Sir David Wallace Centre, Loughborough

4 May 2014

| Newcastle Eagles | 83–71 (OT) | Leicester Riders |
Newcastle wins on aggregate, 162–161

Sport Central, Newcastle upon Tyne

(2) Sheffield Sharks vs. (3) Worcester Wolves

2 May 2014

| Sheffield Sharks | 59–79 | Worcester Wolves |

English Institute of Sport, Sheffield

4 May 2014

| Worcester Wolves | 67–60 | Sheffield Sharks |
Worcester wins on aggregate, 146–119

Worcester Arena, Worcester

==== Final ====
11 May 2014
3.00pm GMT

Report

| Newcastle Eagles | 78–90 | Worcester Wolves |
Scoring by quarter: 15–29, 27–19, 10–24, 26–18
| Pts: Darius Defoe, 22; Rebs: Fabulous Flournoy, 10; Asts: Four players, 3 | | Pts: Zaire Taylor, 30; Rebs: Will Creekmore, 14; Asts: Zaire Taylor, 9 |

Wembley Arena, London

== EBL National League Division 1 (Tier 2) ==
=== Final standings ===
| Pos | Team | Pld | W | L | % | Pts |
|---|---|---|---|---|---|---|
| 1 | Reading Rockets | 26 | 22 | 4 | 0.846 | 44 |
| 2 | Essex Leopards | 26 | 20 | 6 | 0.769 | 40 |
| 3 | Hemel Storm | 26 | 18 | 8 | 0.692 | 36 |
| 4 | Bradford Dragons | 26 | 17 | 9 | 0.654 | 34 |
| 5 | Manchester Magic | 26 | 16 | 10 | 0.615 | 32 |
| 6 | Leeds Carnegie | 26 | 15 | 11 | 0.577 | 30 |
| 7 | Bristol Academy Flyers | 26 | 14 | 12 | 0.538 | 28 |
| 8 | Newham Neptunes | 26 | 13 | 13 | 0.500 | 26 |
| 9 | Tees Valley Mohawks | 26 | 12 | 14 | 0.462 | 24 |
| 10 | Worthing Thunder | 26 | 11 | 15 | 0.423 | 22 |
| 11 | Medway Park Crusaders | 26 | 9 | 17 | 0.346 | 18 |
| 12 | Westminster Warriors | 26 | 7 | 19 | 0.269 | 14 |
| 13 | Team Northumbria | 26 | 6 | 20 | 0.231 | 12 |
| 14 | Leicester Warriors | 26 | 2 | 24 | 0.078 | 4 |

| = League winners |
| = Qualified for the play-offs |

== EBL National League Division 2 (Tier 3) ==
=== Final standings ===
| Pos | Team | Pld | W | L | % | Pts |
|---|---|---|---|---|---|---|
| 1 | Derby Trailblazers | 20 | 17 | 3 | 0.850 | 34 |
| 2 | Huddersfield Heat | 20 | 15 | 5 | 0.750 | 30 |
| 3 | Ipswich | 20 | 14 | 6 | 0.700 | 28 |
| 4 | Brixton TopCats | 20 | 12 | 8 | 0.600 | 24 |
| 5 | Loughborough University | 20 | 10 | 10 | 0.500 | 20 |
| 6 | Worcester Wolves II | 20 | 9 | 11 | 0.450 | 18 |
| 7 | Eastside Eagles | 20 | 9 | 11 | 0.450 | 18 |
| 8 | Derbyshire Arrows | 20 | 9 | 11 | 0.450 | 18 |
| 9 | London Westside | 20 | 8 | 12 | 0.400 | 16 |
| 10 | London United | 20 | 6 | 14 | 0.300 | 12 |
| 11 | Mansfield Giants | 20 | 1 | 19 | 0.050 | 2 |

| = League winners |
| = Qualified for the play-offs |

== BBL Cup ==
The winners of the four 1st Round matches were joined by Glasgow Rocks, Leicester Riders, Newcastle Eagles and Surrey United in the Quarter-finals, who received byes for finishing in the top four BBL Championship positions last season. The Final was played on 12 January 2014 at the National Indoor Arena in Birmingham.

=== 1st round ===
18 October 2013

| Worcester Wolves | 88–66 | Manchester Giants |

Worcester Arena, Worcester

19 October 2013

| Durham Wildcats | 78–75 | Cheshire Phoenix |

Newton Aycliffe Leisure Centre, Newton Aycliffe

19 October 2013

| Birmingham Knights | 72–103 | Plymouth Raiders |

North Solihull Sports Centre, Birmingham

1 November 2013

| Sheffield Sharks | 90–63 | London Lions |

English Institute of Sport, Sheffield

=== Quarter-finals ===
2 November 2013

| Leicester Riders | 74–62 | Worcester Wolves |

John Sandford Centre, Leicester

8 November 2013

| Surrey United | 57–91 | Plymouth Raiders |

Surrey Sports Park, Guildford

17 November 2013

| Glasgow Rocks | 69–81 | Newcastle Eagles |

Emirates Arena, Glasgow

22 November 2013

| Sheffield Sharks | 70–58 | Durham Wildcats |

English Institute of Sport, Sheffield

=== Semi-finals ===
Plymouth Raiders vs. Leicester Riders

29 November 2013

| Plymouth Raiders | 89–95 | Leicester Riders |

Plymouth Pavilions, Plymouth

7 December 2013

| Leicester Riders | 104–77 | Plymouth Raiders |
Leicester wins on aggregate, 199–166

John Sandford Centre, Leicester

Sheffield Sharks vs. Newcastle Eagles

29 November 2013

| Sheffield Sharks | 82–79 | Newcastle Eagles |

English Institute of Sport, Sheffield

13 December 2013

| Newcastle Eagles | 84–57 | Sheffield Sharks |
Newcastle wins on aggregate, 163–139

Sport Central, Newcastle upon Tyne

=== Final ===
12 January 2014
3.30pm GMT

Report

| Leicester Riders | 72–69 | Newcastle Eagles |
Scoring by quarter: 14–20, 18–17, 17–21, 23–11
| Pts: Jay Cousinard, 18; Rebs: Andrew Sullivan, 10; Asts: Jay Cousinard, 4 | | Pts: Charles Smith, 27; Rebs: Scott Martin, 13; Asts: Andrew Lasker, 4 |

National Indoor Arena, Birmingham

== BBL Trophy ==
The 12 BBL clubs were joined by Bristol Flyers, Essex Leopards, Leeds Carnegie and Reading Rockets of the English Basketball League to form a straight knock-out competition. The first two rounds featured one-off games whilst the Semi-finals took place over two legs. The Final was held at the Emirates Arena in Glasgow for the second consecutive year and saw Worcester Wolves win their first silverware since joining the BBL in 2006.

=== 1st round ===
16 January 2014

| Bristol Flyers | 91–75 | Surrey United |

WISE Basketball Arena, Bristol

17 January 2014

| Leeds Carnegie | 48–84 | Glasgow Rocks |

Carnegie Sports Centre, Leeds

18 January 2014

| Plymouth Raiders | 90–81 | Durham Wildcats |

Plymouth Pavilions, Plymouth

19 January 2014

| Essex Leopards | 73–101 | Newcastle Eagles |

Brentwood Centre, Brentwood

19 January 2014

| Reading Rockets | 73–85 | Sheffield Sharks |

Rivermead Leisure Complex, Reading

19 January 2014

| Manchester Giants | 91–74 | Birmingham Knights |

Wright Robinson College, Manchester

19 January 2014

| Cheshire Phoenix | 86–78 | Leicester Riders |

Northgate Arena, Chester

2 February 2014

| London Lions | 73–82 | Worcester Wolves |

Copper Box, London

=== Quarter-finals ===
12 February 2014

| Plymouth Raiders | 60–74 | Sheffield Sharks |

Plymouth Pavilions, Plymouth

16 February 2014

| Cheshire Phoenix | 85–56 | Bristol Flyers |

Northgate Arena, Chester

21 February 2014

| Newcastle Eagles | 73–86 | Worcester Wolves |

Sport Central, Newcastle upon Tyne

23 February 2014

| Manchester Giants | 71–73 | Glasgow Rocks |

Wright Robinson College, Manchester

=== Semi-finals ===
Sheffield Sharks vs. Worcester Wolves

7 March 2014

| Sheffield Sharks | 60–62 | Worcester Wolves |

English Institute of Sport, Sheffield

12 March 2014

| Worcester Wolves | 84–70 | Sheffield Sharks |
Worcester wins on aggregate, 146–130

Worcester Arena, Worcester

Cheshire Phoenix vs. Glasgow Rocks

9 March 2014

| Cheshire Phoenix | 80–74 | Glasgow Rocks |

Northgate Arena, Chester

14 March 2014

| Glasgow Rocks | 98–77 | Cheshire Phoenix |
Glasgow wins on aggregate, 172–157

Emirates Arena, Glasgow

=== Final ===
30 March 2014
3.15pm GMT

Report

| Worcester Wolves | 83–76 | Glasgow Rocks |
Scoring by quarter: 15–25, 23–19, 20–11, 25–21
| Pts: Jamal Williams, 26; Rebs: Will Creekmore, 15; Asts: Zaire Taylor, 6 | | Pts: Gareth Murray, 21; Rebs: Fran Urli, 12; Asts: Fran Urli, 5 |

Emirates Arena, Glasgow

== Statistics leaders ==
| Category | Player | Stat |
|---|---|---|
| Points per game | (United States) Victor Moses (Cheshire Phoenix) | 23.2 |
| Rebounds per game | (United States) Victor Moses (Cheshire Phoenix) | 13.2 |
| Assists per game | (United States) Zaire Taylor (Worcester Wolves) | 6.9 |
| Steals per game | (United States) Zaire Taylor (Worcester Wolves) | 2.8 |
| Blocks per game | (United States) Mike Allison (Durham Wildcats) | 2.4 |
| Field goal percentage | (United States) Rashad Hassan (Leicester Riders) | 66.8% |
| Free throw percentage | (United States) B.J. Holmes (Sheffield Sharks) | 87.1% |
| Three-point field goal percentage | (United Kingdom) David Watts (Manchester Giants) | 42.8% |

== Monthly awards ==
| Month | Coach of the Month | Player of the Month |
|---|---|---|
| October | (United Kingdom) Paul James (Worcester Wolves) | (United States) Will Creekmore (Worcester Wolves) |
| November | (United States) (United Kingdom) Atiba Lyons (Sheffield Sharks) | (United States) Victor Moses (Cheshire Phoenix) |
| December | (United Kingdom) John Lavery (Cheshire Phoenix) | (United States) Zaire Taylor (Worcester Wolves) |
| January | (United States) (Italy) Rob Paternostro (Leicester Riders) | (United States) Victor Moses (Cheshire Phoenix) |
| February | (United Kingdom) Paul James (Worcester Wolves) | (United States) Victor Moses (Cheshire Phoenix) |
| March | (United States) (United Kingdom) Fabulous Flournoy (Newcastle Eagles) | (United Kingdom) Robert Marsden (Manchester Giants) |

== Seasonal awards ==
- Molten Most Valuable Player: Zaire Taylor (Worcester Wolves)
- Molten Coach of the Year: Fabulous Flournoy (Newcastle Eagles)
- Molten Team of the Year:
  - Zaire Taylor (Worcester Wolves)
  - Will Creekmore (Worcester Wolves)
  - Victor Moses (Cheshire Phoenix)
  - Reggie Middleton (Cheshire Phoenix)
  - Malik Cooke (Newcastle Eagles)
- Molten Defensive Team of the Year:
  - Zaire Taylor (Worcester Wolves)
  - Andrew Sullivan (Leicester Riders)
  - Daniel Northern (Glasgow Rocks)
  - Mike Allison (Durham Wildcats)
  - Fabulous Flournoy (Newcastle Eagles)
  - Paul Gause (Newcastle Eagles)
- Molten British Team of the Year:
  - David Aliu (Manchester Giants)
  - Robert Marsden (Manchester Giants)
  - James Jones (Manchester Giants)
  - Andrew Sullivan (Leicester Riders)
  - Darius Defoe (Newcastle Eagles)
  - Nick George (Plymouth Raiders)

For the British Team of the Year and Defensive Team of the Year, six players were announced instead of the usual five due to a deadlock in votes cast by the BBL head coaches.

| Preceded by 2012–13 season | BBL seasons 2013–14 | Succeeded by 2014–15 season |
