= 2014–15 British Basketball League season =

2014–15 BBL season
- League: British Basketball League
- Sport: Basketball
- Duration: 26 September 2014 – 19 April 2015 (Regular season); 22 April 2015 – 10 May 2015 (Playoffs)
- Games: 36
- Teams: 13

Regular Season
- Top seed: Newcastle Eagles
- Season MVP: Charles Smith; Newcastle Eagles
- Top scorer: Demond Watt; Cheshire Phoenix (666 points)

BBL Tournaments
- BBL Playoffs champions: Newcastle Eagles
- BBL Playoffs runners-up: London Lions
- BBL Cup champions: Newcastle Eagles
- BBL Cup runners-up: Glasgow Rocks
- BBL Trophy champions: Newcastle Eagles
- BBL Trophy runners-up: Leicester Riders

BBL seasons
- ← 2013–14 2015–16 (BBL); 2015–16 (EBL)

The 2014–15 BBL season was the 28th campaign of the British Basketball League since the league's establishment in 1987. The season featured 13 teams from across England and Scotland, including new entrants, Bristol Flyers and Leeds Force. The season started on 26 September 2014 and ended on 10 May 2015 with the Play-off Final at The O2 Arena.

As they did in 2005–06 and 2011–12, Newcastle Eagles completed a clean sweep of honours available during the season. After a 31–5 regular season campaign – which ensured the Championship and top seeding for the play-offs – the Eagles then defeated Bristol Flyers and Sheffield Sharks to make the final, which they then won 96–84 over London Lions. The Eagles also won the BBL Cup in January against Glasgow Rocks, and the BBL Trophy in March against Leicester Riders.

== Teams ==
Locations of the 2014–15 BBL teams

| Team | City | Arena | Capacity | Last season |
|---|---|---|---|---|
| Bristol Flyers | Bristol | SGS WISE Arena | 750 | New |
| Cheshire Phoenix | Chester | Northgate Arena | 1,000 | 5th |
| Durham Wildcats | Newton Aycliffe | Newton Aycliffe Leisure Centre | 1,200 | 8th |
| Glasgow Rocks | Glasgow | Emirates Arena | 6,500 | 10th |
| Leeds Force | Leeds | Carnegie Sports Arena | 500 | New |
| Leicester Riders | Leicester | Sir David Wallace Centre | 1,000 | 4th |
| London Lions | London | Copper Box | 7,000 | 6th |
| Manchester Giants | Manchester | Trafford Powerleague Arena | 1,100 | 9th |
| Newcastle Eagles | Newcastle upon Tyne | Sport Central | 3,000 | 1st |
| Plymouth Raiders | Plymouth | Plymouth Pavilions | 1,480 | 9th |
| Sheffield Sharks | Sheffield | English Institute of Sport | 1,000 | 2nd |
| Surrey United | Guildford | Surrey Sports Park | 1,000 | 11th |
| Worcester Wolves | Worcester | Worcester Arena | 2,000 | 3rd |

== BBL Championship (Tier 1) ==
=== Regular season ===
==== Standings ====
| Pos | Team | Pld | W | L | PF | PA | PD | Pts | Qualification |
|---|---|---|---|---|---|---|---|---|---|
| 1 | Newcastle Eagles | 36 | 31 | 5 | 3494 | 2960 | +534 | 62 | Qualification to playoffs |
| 2 | Leicester Riders | 36 | 30 | 6 | 3147 | 2731 | +416 | 60 | Qualification to playoffs |
| 3 | Worcester Wolves | 36 | 28 | 8 | 2959 | 2735 | +224 | 56 | Qualification to playoffs |
| 4 | Cheshire Phoenix | 36 | 26 | 10 | 3146 | 2839 | +307 | 52 | Qualification to playoffs |
| 5 | Glasgow Rocks | 36 | 21 | 15 | 2948 | 2879 | +69 | 42 | Qualification to playoffs |
| 6 | London Lions | 36 | 21 | 15 | 2835 | 2673 | +162 | 42 | Qualification to playoffs |
| 7 | Sheffield Sharks | 36 | 19 | 17 | 2868 | 2755 | +113 | 38 | Qualification to playoffs |
| 8 | Bristol Flyers | 36 | 13 | 23 | 2589 | 2811 | −222 | 26 | Qualification to playoffs |
| 9 | Manchester Giants | 36 | 12 | 24 | 2944 | 3120 | −176 | 24 | |
| 10 | Plymouth Raiders | 36 | 11 | 25 | 3044 | 3278 | −234 | 22 | |
| 11 | Leeds Force | 36 | 9 | 27 | 2314 | 2693 | −379 | 18 | |
| 12 | Durham Wildcats | 36 | 8 | 28 | 2591 | 2878 | −287 | 16 | |
| 13 | Surrey United | 36 | 5 | 31 | 2652 | 3179 | −527 | 10 | |

Source: BBL

==== Results ====
| Home \ Away | BRI | CHE | DUR | GLA | LEE | LEI | LON | MAN | NEW | PLY | SHE | SUR | WOR |
|---|---|---|---|---|---|---|---|---|---|---|---|---|---|
| Bristol Flyers | | 73–86 | 61–72 | 91–97 | 71–47 | 59–82 | 63–85 | 72–67 | 93–105 | 65–56 | 73–72 | 74–91 | 68–69 |
| Bristol Flyers | | | | | 79–54 | 68–81 | | 76–81 | | 88–84 | 70–79 | 70–62 | |
| Cheshire Phoenix | 92–72 | | 83–79 | 80–61 | 66–48 | 59–65 | 84–75 | 93–75 | 81–88 | 104–98 | 85–91 | 97–63 | 97–86 |
| Cheshire Phoenix | 79–68 | | 91–58 | | 76–78 | | | | | 102–84 | 75–68 | | 89–75 |
| Durham Wildcats | 77–72 | 76–99 | | 81–83 | 80–46 | 67–101 | 80–73 | 84–92 | 73–99 | 67–75 | 63–65 | 101–57 | 58–66 |
| Durham Wildcats | 73–84 | | | 75–81 | | | 71–83 | 70–67 | | | | 76–75 | 79–110 |
| Glasgow Rocks | 62–79 | 86–89 | 79–68 | | 67–59 | 80–71 | 89–86 | 90–85 | 69–88 | 99–104 | 72–64 | 96–77 | 99–96 |
| Glasgow Rocks | 107–82 | 68–77 | | | | 78–81 | 82–65 | | | 72–82 | | | 89–60 |
| Leeds Force | 58–73 | 53–65 | 70–62 | 57–77 | | 50–76 | 61–64 | 85–76 | 56–94 | 79–83 | 52–71 | 73–61 | 69–98 |
| Leeds Force | | | 81–70 | 62–70 | | | | | 68–94 | 80–93 | 73–79 | | 54–84 |
| Leicester Riders | 83–54 | 88–87 | 85–46 | 93–82 | 71–62 | | 87–81 | 104–82 | 89–95 | 106–86 | 98–85 | 102–87 | 82–86 |
| Leicester Riders | | 100–82 | 84–81 | | 74–54 | | | | 116–84 | 109–75 | | | 66–63 |
| London Lions | 76–68 | 87–71 | 20–0 | 67–75 | 78–70 | 89–75 | | 86–73 | 56–69 | 91–63 | 61–81 | 104–65 | 88–70 |
| London Lions | 78–65 | 82–94 | | | 64–69 | 76–91 | | | 82–99 | | 71–73 | | |
| Manchester Giants | 73–82 | 82–99 | 80–69 | 70–77 | 72–61 | 69–80 | 79–87 | | 87–117 | 102–77 | 76–72 | 101–90 | 93–83 |
| Manchester Giants | | 93–85 | | 82–91 | 57–64 | 87–104 | 78–96 | | | | | 91–77 | |
| Newcastle Eagles | 98–72 | 119–92 | 99–83 | 103–93 | 98–91 | 104–81 | 94–87 | 115–76 | | 123–101 | 95–84 | 105–78 | 81–86 |
| Newcastle Eagles | 101–74 | 78–101 | 98–71 | 96–67 | | | | 107–97 | | | | 101–62 | |
| Plymouth Raiders | 86–91 | 107–116 | 88–101 | 85–100 | 73–69 | 91–99 | 65–89 | 80–91 | 82–88 | | 91–90 | 94–74 | 88–95 |
| Plymouth Raiders | | | 94–87 | | | | 83–94 | 90–93 | 90–101 | | | 100–88 | 90–95 |
| Sheffield Sharks | 92–61 | 82–95 | 83–70 | 69–55 | 60–62 | 86–89 | 80–83 | 96–80 | 75–95 | 79–55 | | 100–68 | 76–78 |
| Sheffield Sharks | | | 85–72 | 91–88 | | 72–80 | | 96–87 | 84–97 | 93–88 | | | |
| Surrey United | 53–65 | 69–99 | 80–78 | 97–76 | 76–65 | 56–85 | 73–89 | 90–89 | 76–97 | 72–78 | 53–60 | | 62–78 |
| Surrey United | | 81–109 | | 75–111 | 73–76 | 91–102 | 83–89 | | | | 79–95 | | |
| Worcester Wolves | 79–65 | 83–67 | 89–73 | 92–80 | 68–58 | 77–67 | 83–78 | 90–81 | 99–91 | 86–85 | 78–75 | 82–68 | |
| Worcester Wolves | 74–48 | | | | | | 70–75 | 85–80 | 88–81 | | 87–65 | 71–70 | |

Legend: Blue = home team win; Yellow = draw; Red = away team win.

=== Playoffs ===
==== Bracket ====
Quarter-Finals
1 | Newcastle Eagles | 84 | 92 | 176
8 | Bristol Flyers | 64 | 80 | 144
2 | Leicester Riders | 68 | 91 | 159
7 | Sheffield Sharks | 79 | 85 | 164
3 | Worcester Wolves | 75 | 67 | 142
6 | London Lions | 80 | 106 | 186
4 | Cheshire Phoenix | 91 | 86 | 177
5 | Glasgow Rocks | 78 | 87 | 165

Semi-Finals
1 | Newcastle Eagles | 91 | 118 | 209
7 | Sheffield Sharks | 90 | 78 | 168
6 | London Lions | 81 | 77 | 158
4 | Cheshire Phoenix | 68 | 85 | 153

Final
1 | Newcastle Eagles | 96
6 | London Lions | 84

==== Quarter-finals ====
(1) Newcastle Eagles vs. (8) Bristol Flyers

23 April 2015
19:30

Report

| Bristol Flyers | 64–84 | Newcastle Eagles |
Scoring by quarter: 6–17, 17–15, 19–31, 22–21
| Pts: Greg Streete, Doug McLaughlin-Williams (14); Rebs: Bryquis Perine (8); Asts: Dwayne Lautier-Ogunleye, Roy Owen (3) | | Pts: Andre Jones, Charles Smith, Andrew Thomson (17); Rebs: Andre Jones, Andrew Thomson, Scott Martin (9); Asts: Charles Smith (5) |

WISE Arena, Stoke Gifford

24 April 2015
19:30

Report

| Newcastle Eagles | 92–80 | Bristol Flyers |
Scoring by quarter: 24–23, 18–16, 25–22, 25–19
| Pts: Scott Martin (22); Rebs: Andrew Lasker (13); Asts: Rahmon Fletcher (9) | | Pts: Mathias Seilund (17); Rebs: Greg Streete (10); Asts: Bryquis Perine (11) |
Newcastle win 176–144 on aggregate.

Sport Central, Newcastle upon Tyne

(2) Leicester Riders vs. (7) Sheffield Sharks

22 April 2015
19:30

Report

| Sheffield Sharks | 79–68 | Leicester Riders |
Scoring by quarter: 19–18, 19–19, 22–16, 19–25
| Pts: Mike Cook (25); Rebs: Michael Tuck (9); Asts: B. J. Holmes (4) | | Pts: TrayVonn Wright (20); Rebs: TrayVonn Wright (14); Asts: Neil Watson (5) |

English Institute of Sport, Sheffield

24 April 2015
20:00

Report

| Leicester Riders | 91–85 (OT) | Sheffield Sharks |
Scoring by quarter: 22–16, 17–24, 12–8, 27–19, Overtime: 13–18
| Pts: Tyler Bernardini (25); Rebs: TrayVonn Wright (9); Asts: Neil Watson (8) | | Pts: B. J. Holmes (23); Rebs: Nick Lewis (10); Asts: B. J. Holmes (3) |
Sheffield win 164–159 on aggregate.

Sir David Wallace Centre, Loughborough

(3) Worcester Wolves vs. (6) London Lions

24 April 2015
19:30

Report

| Worcester Wolves | 75–80 | London Lions |
Scoring by quarter: 21–19, 18–18, 19–23, 17–20
| Pts: Alex Owumi (21); Rebs: Robert Thurman (12); Asts: Chavis Holmes, Jamal Williams (5) | | Pts: Andrew Sullivan (17); Rebs: Olumide Oyedeji (10); Asts: Zaire Taylor (6) |

University of Worcester Arena, Worcester

26 April 2015
16:00

Report

| London Lions | 106–67 | Worcester Wolves |
Scoring by quarter: 24–16, 25–22, 30–10, 27–19
| Pts: Zaire Taylor (41); Rebs: Olumide Oyedeji (9); Asts: Andrew Sullivan (5) | | Pts: Alex Owumi (18); Rebs: Alex Owumi (10); Asts: Chavis Holmes (5) |
London win 186–142 on aggregate.

Copper Box, London

(4) Cheshire Phoenix vs. (5) Glasgow Rocks

24 April 2015
19:30

Report

| Glasgow Rocks | 78–91 | Cheshire Phoenix |
Scoring by quarter: 19–23, 19–20, 24–19, 16–29
| Pts: Omotayo Ogedengbe (22); Rebs: Kieron Achara (9); Asts: Reggie Middleton (6) | | Pts: Demond Watt (28); Rebs: Demond Watt (11); Asts: Dustin Salisbery (8) |

Emirates Arena, Glasgow

26 April 2015
17:30

Report

| Cheshire Phoenix | 86–87 | Glasgow Rocks |
Scoring by quarter: 21–17, 19–22, 19–21, 27–27
| Pts: Taylor King (26); Rebs: Demond Watt (13); Asts: Dustin Salisbery (8) | | Pts: Danny Huffor, Tommy Freeman (18); Rebs: Paul Egwuonwu, Danny Huffor (9); Asts: Reggie Middleton (6) |
Cheshire win 177–165 on aggregate.

Northgate Arena, Chester

==== Semi-finals ====
(1) Newcastle Eagles vs. (7) Sheffield Sharks

1 May 2015
19:30

Report

| Sheffield Sharks | 90–91 | Newcastle Eagles |
Scoring by quarter: 22–17, 24–28, 23–28, 21–18
| Pts: Mike Cook, B. J. Holmes (18); Rebs: John Barber (12); Asts: Mike Cook (6) | | Pts: Scott Martin (24); Rebs: Andrew Thomson (10); Asts: Scott Martin, Rahmon Fletcher (7) |

English Institute of Sport, Sheffield

3 May 2015
17:00

Report

| Newcastle Eagles | 118–78 | Sheffield Sharks |
Scoring by quarter: 26–26, 26–18, 33–16, 33–18
| Pts: Rahmon Fletcher (28); Rebs: Andrew Thomson (16); Asts: Andrew Lasker (7) | | Pts: Michael Tuck (21); Rebs: Michael Tuck (14); Asts: B. J. Holmes (4) |
Newcastle win 209–168 on aggregate.

Sport Central, Newcastle upon Tyne

(4) Cheshire Phoenix vs. (6) London Lions

1 May 2015
19:30

Report

| London Lions | 81–68 | Cheshire Phoenix |
Scoring by quarter: 19–17, 21–19, 25–10, 16–22
| Pts: Zaire Taylor (26); Rebs: Andrew Sullivan (9); Asts: Andrew Sullivan (4) | | Pts: Dustin Salisbery, Demond Watt (17); Rebs: Demond Watt (10); Asts: Dustin Salisbery (4) |

Copper Box, London

3 May 2015
17:30

Report

| Cheshire Phoenix | 85–77 | London Lions |
Scoring by quarter: 23–23, 17–19, 12–16, 33–19
| Pts: Dustin Salisbery (24); Rebs: Demond Watt (11); Asts: Dustin Salisbery, Taylor King (2) | | Pts: Zaire Taylor (32); Rebs: Olumide Oyedeji (11); Asts: Olumide Oyedeji (3) |
London win 158–153 on aggregate.

Northgate Arena, Chester

==== Final ====
(1) Newcastle Eagles vs. (6) London Lions

BBC Red Button

10 May 2015
16:00

Report

| Newcastle Eagles | 96–84 | London Lions |
Scoring by quarter: 24–24, 25–15, 25–16, 22–29
| Pts: Charles Smith (24); Rebs: Andrew Lasker (11); Asts: Rahmon Fletcher (9) | | Pts: Andrew Sullivan (27); Rebs: Olumide Oyedeji (10); Asts: Zaire Taylor (6) |

The O2 Arena, London
Attendance: 14,700

== EBL National League Division 1 (Tier 2) ==
=== Final standings ===
| Pos | Team | Pld | W | L | Pts | Qualification |
|---|---|---|---|---|---|---|
| 1 | Essex Leopards | 24 | 18 | 6 | 36 | League winners |
| 2 | Manchester Magic | 24 | 17 | 7 | 34 | Qualified for the Play-offs |
| 3 | Derby Trailblazers | 24 | 17 | 7 | 34 | Qualified for the Play-offs |
| 4 | Kent Crusaders | 24 | 16 | 8 | 32 | Qualified for the Play-offs |
| 5 | Reading Rockets | 24 | 15 | 9 | 30 | Qualified for the Play-offs |
| 6 | Team Northumbria | 24 | 15 | 9 | 30 | Qualified for the Play-offs |
| 7 | Worthing Thunder | 24 | 11 | 13 | 22 | Qualified for the Play-offs |
| 8 | Bradford Dragons | 24 | 10 | 14 | 20 | Qualified for the Play-offs |
| 9 | Leicester Warriors | 24 | 9 | 15 | 18 | |
| 10 | Hemel Storm | 24 | 9 | 15 | 18 | |
| 11 | Tees Valley Mohawks | 24 | 9 | 15 | 18 | |
| 12 | Westminster Warriors | 24 | 6 | 18 | 12 | |
| 13 | Newham Neptunes | 24 | 4 | 20 | 8 | |

== EBL National League Division 2 (Tier 3) ==
=== Final standings ===
| Pos | Team | Pld | W | L | NR | Pts | Qualification |
|---|---|---|---|---|---|---|---|
| 1 | London Lituanica | 22 | 21 | 1 | 0 | 42 | League winners |
| 2 | Lancashire Spinners | 22 | 19 | 3 | 0 | 38 | Qualified for the Play-offs |
| 3 | Ipswich | 22 | 15 | 7 | 0 | 30 | Qualified for the Play-offs |
| 4 | Loughborough Student Riders | 21 | 14 | 7 | 1 | 28 | Qualified for the Play-offs |
| 5 | London Greenhouse Pioneers | 21 | 12 | 9 | 1 | 24 | Qualified for the Play-offs |
| 6 | Derbyshire Arrows | 22 | 12 | 10 | 0 | 24 | Qualified for the Play-offs |
| 7 | Brixton TopCats | 22 | 10 | 12 | 0 | 20 | Qualified for the Play-offs |
| 8 | London Westside | 22 | 8 | 14 | 0 | 16 | Qualified for the Play-offs |
| 9 | Eastside Eagles London | 22 | 6 | 16 | 0 | 12 | |
| 10 | Birmingham Mets | 22 | 6 | 16 | 0 | 12 | |
| 11 | Worcester Wolves B | 22 | 5 | 17 | 0 | 10 | |
| 12 | London United | 22 | 3 | 19 | 0 | 6 | |

== BBL Cup ==
The winners of the five 1st Round matches will be joined by Newcastle Eagles, Worcester Wolves and Sheffield Sharks in the Quarter-finals, who received byes for finishing in the top three BBL Championship positions last season. The Final will be played on 11 January 2015 at the National Indoor Arena in Birmingham.

=== 1st round ===
10 October 2014

| Leeds Force | 80–69 | Manchester Giants |

Carnegie Sports Centre, Leeds

11 October 2014

| Leicester Riders | 98–80 | Surrey United |

Sir David Wallace Centre, Loughborough

11 October 2014

| Bristol Flyers | 93–92 | Plymouth Raiders |

WISE Arena, Bristol

12 October 2014

| Glasgow Rocks | 62–56 | London Lions |

Emirates Arena, Glasgow

12 October 2014

| Cheshire Phoenix | 88–65 | Durham Wildcats |

Northgate Arena, Cheshire

=== Quarter-finals ===
31 October 2014

| Newcastle Eagles | 83–66 | Leeds Force |

Sport Central, Newcastle upon Tyne

31 October 2014

| Sheffield Sharks | 91–84 | Cheshire Phoenix |

English Institute of Sport, Sheffield

31 October 2014

| Worcester Wolves | 82–90 | Bristol Flyers |

Worcester Arena, Worcester

23 November 2014

| Leicester Riders | 84–85 | Glasgow Rocks |

Sir David Wallace Centre, Loughborough

=== Semi-finals ===
Sheffield Sharks vs. Newcastle Eagles

28 November 2014

| Sheffield Sharks | 75–77 | Newcastle Eagles |

English Institute of Sport, Sheffield

12 December 2014

| Newcastle Eagles | 85–76 | Sheffield Sharks |
Newcastle win 162–151 on aggregate.

Sport Central, Newcastle upon Tyne

Bristol Flyers vs. Glasgow Rocks

12 December 2014

| Bristol Flyers | 75–77 | Glasgow Rocks |

WISE Arena, Bristol

14 December 2014

| Glasgow Rocks | 84–57 | Bristol Flyers |
Glasgow win 161–132 on aggregate.

Emirates Arena, Glasgow

=== Final ===
11 January 2015
15:30 GMT

Report

| Newcastle Eagles | 84–71 | Glasgow Rocks |
Scoring by quarter: 15–15, 25–14, 20–22, 24–20
| Pts: Charles Smith (21); Rebs: Andrew Thomson, Scott Martin, Fabulous Flournoy (7); Asts: Andre Jones, Rahmon Fletcher (4) | | Pts: JaJuan Smith (17); Rebs: Kieron Achara (11); Asts: JaJuan Smith (3) |

Barclaycard Arena, Birmingham

== BBL Trophy ==
The 13 BBL clubs were joined by Essex Leopards and Reading Rockets of the English Basketball League and Falkirk Fury of the Scottish Basketball League to form a straight knock-out competition. The first two rounds featured one-off games whilst the Semi-finals took place over two legs. The Final was held at the Emirates Arena in Glasgow on 8 March 2015, and this was the third consecutive year that the venue has hosted the event.

=== 1st round ===
14 January 2015
19:30

| London Lions | 85–73 | Bristol Flyers |

Copper Box, London

16 January 2015
20:00

| Essex Leopards | 64–69 | Surrey United |

Brentwood Centre, Brentwood

17 January 2015
19:30

| Leicester Riders | 81–51 | Leeds Force |

Sir David Wallace Centre, Loughborough

18 January 2015
16:00

| Durham Wildcats | 84–86 | Worcester Wolves |

Newton Aycliffe Leisure Centre, Newton Aycliffe

18 January 2015
16:00

| Plymouth Raiders | 109–100 | Cheshire Phoenix |

Plymouth Pavilions, Plymouth

18 January 2015
16:00

| Reading Rockets | 90–112 | Newcastle Eagles |

Rivermead Leisure Complex, Reading

18 January 2015
17:00

| Falkirk Fury | 46–112 | Glasgow Rocks |

Grangemouth Sports Complex, Grangemouth

18 January 2015
18:00

| Manchester Giants | 76–79 | Sheffield Sharks |

Trafford Powerleague Arena, Manchester

=== Quarter-finals ===
31 January 2015
19:30

| Leicester Riders | 80–71 | Worcester Wolves |

Sir David Wallace Centre, Loughborough

7 February 2015
19:30

| Plymouth Raiders | 86–77 | Surrey United |

Plymouth Pavilions, Plymouth

8 February 2015
17:00

| Glasgow Rocks | 70–88 | Newcastle Eagles |

Emirates Arena, Glasgow

13 February 2015
19:30

| London Lions | 86–80 | Sheffield Sharks |

Copper Box, London

=== Semi-finals ===
Newcastle Eagles vs. Plymouth Raiders

27 February 2015
19:30

| Newcastle Eagles | 126–79 | Plymouth Raiders |

Sport Central, Newcastle upon Tyne

1 March 2015
16:00

| Plymouth Raiders | 99–104 | Newcastle Eagles |
Newcastle win 230–178 on aggregate.

Plymouth Pavilions, Plymouth

Leicester Riders vs. London Lions

1 March 2015
18:00

| Leicester Riders | 80–63 | London Lions |

Sir David Wallace Centre, Loughborough

8 March 2015
16:00

| London Lions | 81–91 | Leicester Riders |
Leicester win 171–144 on aggregate.

Copper Box, London

=== Final ===
22 March 2015
15:30 GMT

Report

| Newcastle Eagles | 96–90 | Leicester Riders |
Scoring by quarter: 28–24, 17–21, 26–28, 25–17
| Pts: Scott Martin (20); Rebs: Charles Smith (7); Asts: Rahmon Fletcher (8) | | Pts: Jamell Anderson (20); Rebs: TrayVonn Wright (10); Asts: Neil Watson (13) |

Emirates Arena, Glasgow

== Monthly awards ==
| Month | Coach of the Month | | Player of the Month | |
|---|---|---|---|---|
| October | Andreas Kapoulas | Bristol Flyers | Demond Watt | Cheshire Phoenix |
| November | Fabulous Flournoy | Newcastle Eagles | Kieron Achara | Glasgow Rocks |
| December | John Coffino | Cheshire Phoenix | Demond Watt | Cheshire Phoenix |
| January | Fabulous Flournoy | Newcastle Eagles | Jordan Clarke | Plymouth Raiders |
| February | Fabulous Flournoy | Newcastle Eagles | Demond Watt | Cheshire Phoenix |
| March | Fabulous Flournoy | Newcastle Eagles | Demond Watt | Cheshire Phoenix |
| April | Atiba Lyons | Sheffield Sharks | Charles Smith | Newcastle Eagles |
| Season | Andreas Kapoulas | Bristol Flyers | Charles Smith | Newcastle Eagles |

| Preceded by 2013–14 season | BBL seasons 2014–15 | Succeeded by 2015–16 season |
