= 2011–12 British Basketball League season =

2011–12 BBL season
- League: British Basketball League
- Sport: Basketball

Roll of Honour
- BBL champions: Newcastle Eagles
- Play Off's champions: Newcastle Eagles
- BBL Cup champions: Newcastle Eagles
- BBL Trophy champions: Newcastle Eagles

British Basketball League seasons
- ← 2010–11 2012–13 →

The 2011–12 BBL season was the 25th campaign of the British Basketball League since the league's establishment in 1987. The season featured 11 teams from across England and Scotland, with Durham Wildcats appearing in their first campaign after election from EBL Division 1. The League did not feature two teams from the previous season; Worthing Thunder had stepped down to the EBL, whilst Essex Pirates withdrew just two weeks prior to the season starting due to the loss of a major sponsor. There was also uncertainty regarding the participation of reigning champions Mersey Tigers, who had to postpone their first game due to off-court problems and operational issues.

Newcastle Eagles opened the season with an 85–63 victory over Northern rivals Glasgow Rocks in the BBL Cup, on September 30, 2011. The Championship regular season didn't commence until mid-October, whilst the initial stages of the Trophy and BBL Cup were played out prior to the Championship beginning. Newcastle were victorious in the BBL Cup and BBL Trophy after beating Plymouth Raiders in the finals of both competitions. The Eagles also went on to clinch their 5th BBL Championship after Plymouth lost to Leicester Riders on April 11, setting a new record for the most Championships won in the history of the BBL. Eagles' 5th title beat the previous record of four Championship's held by Kingston Kings from the 1980s and 1990s. The season was wrapped up with Eagles stamping their dominance on the play-offs, defeating Leicester in the Final on May 12, 2012, and going on to win all four titles for the 2011–12 campaign.

Following the season's climax the British Basketball League, along with several other basketball governing bodies, united to form the British Basketball Union, a new organisation created to promote the commercial development of basketball within Great Britain.

== Teams ==
Locations of the 2011–12 BBL teams

| Team | City/Area | Arena | Capacity | Last season |
|---|---|---|---|---|
| Cheshire Jets | Chester | Northgate Arena | 1,000 | 4th |
| Durham Wildcats | Newton Aycliffe | Newton Aycliffe Leisure Centre | 1,200 | New |
| Glasgow Rocks | Glasgow | Kelvin Hall | 1,200 | 6th |
| Guildford Heat | Guildford | Surrey Sports Park | 1,000 | 7th |
| Leicester Riders | Leicester | John Sandford Centre | 800 | 8th |
| Mersey Tigers | Liverpool | Knowsley Leisure & Culture Park | 450 | 1st |
| Milton Keynes Lions | Milton Keynes | Prestige Homes Arena | 1,400 | 10th |
| Newcastle Eagles | Newcastle upon Tyne | Sport Central | 3,000 | 2nd |
| Plymouth Raiders | Plymouth | Plymouth Pavilions | 1,480 | 5th |
| Sheffield Sharks | Sheffield | English Institute of Sport | 1,200 | 3rd |
| Worcester Wolves | Worcester | University of Worcester | 600 | 9th |

== Notable occurrences ==
- Durham Wildcats were the newest additions to the BBL, having been elected to join from EBL Division 1.
- Pre-season transfer speculation centred around the possibility of Los Angeles Lakers star Ron Artest signing for Cheshire Jets during the NBA lockout, after announcing on his Twitter account that he was in discussions with the club, who had reportedly offered him shares in the franchise. Other reports also linked Artest to Glasgow Rocks.
- After ten years at Cheshire Jets, Paul Smith stepped down from his position as Head Coach prior to the season opening, leaving Assistant John Lavery to take the reins.
- The Mersey Tigers franchise changed ownership following Liverpool-based businessman Steve Brookfield's acquisition from former owner Gary Townsend, who set up the club in 2007.
- Essex Pirates officially withdrew from the BBL on September 16, just two weeks before the start of the season. The loss of a major sponsor was a major factor, and it was revealed the owners even looked at relocating to Crystal Palace NSC Arena in London before the decision was made to disband.
- Mersey Tigers were forced to postpone their first game of the season amid fears of the franchise's imminent collapse. Off-court problems and operational issues were later cited as the reason for postponement, but the franchise eventually fielded a team and resumed play the following week.
- A sell-out 1,200 crowd at Newton Aycliffe Leisure Centre saw Durham play host to their first BBL game, losing 66–88 to local rivals Newcastle Eagles.
- An incident between Guildford Heat's Martelle McLemore and Plymouth Raiders mascot Foxy during a game on October 22 was the subject of a League inquiry after the mascot entered the court and pulled McLemore's shorts down during a break in play. Following the league's inquiry, Plymouth Raiders were given a "small fine" whilst McLemore was awarded with 5 penalty points for his involvement by pushing the Raiders mascot.
- Glasgow Rocks' veteran player-coach Sterling Davis reached two personal milestones in October, making his 1000th BBL Championship free-throw and 5000th point scored.
- After a 12-game losing streak, Guildford Heat finally recorded their first win of the season on December 16, with an 82–76 victory away to current Champions Mersey Tigers.
- Nathan Schall, of Milton Keynes Lions, was the winner of the Kickz.co.uk Slam Dunk Contest 2012 which took place on January 15, prior to the BBL Cup Final.
- Newcastle Eagles collected their first piece of silverware for the season on January 15, 2012, with a 115–94 victory over Plymouth Raiders in the BBL Cup final at the National Indoor Arena. Newcastle's Charles Smith set a new BBL Cup Final record by posting a 39 points, whilst Newcastle also broke the previous record of 103 for points scored.
- Leicester Riders announced in January that their point guard Flinder Boyd had decided to leave the club with immediate effect "in order to pursue interests way from basketball." It was reported in March that the Great Britain international has officially retired from playing, just months before Team GB's Olympic Games tournament.
- Newcastle Eagles scooped their second title of the season with another victory over Plymouth Raiders in the BBL Trophy final. The Eagles won the Trophy with a 184–177 aggregate victory in the two-game series, winning the second leg 96–80 at Sport Central on March 24.
- With title-challengers Plymouth Raiders losing 96–72 away to Leicester Riders on April 11, the Championship trophy returned to Newcastle Eagles, becoming the Northeastern club's third title of the season. The trophy was presented to the Eagles at Sport Central on April 14 at their home game with Mersey Tigers, but celebrations were dampened as Eagles were unexpectedly defeated 74–82 by Mersey.
- Due to the unsuitability of the John Sandford Centre venue for television broadcasting, Leicester Riders were forced to switch venues for their Play-off homes games from their usual home to their former home at the Sports Centre on the campus of Loughborough University.
- Newcastle Eagles completed a 'clean sweep' of titles by claiming the Play-off crown with a 71–62 victory over Leicester Riders in the Grand Final at the National Indoor Arena, on 12 May. Newcastle's Charles Smith was awarded the Final's MVP, scoring 21 points.
- Following the conclusion of the season, the BBL entered into a joint venture with other basketball governing bodies to establish the British Basketball Union (BBU), a new organisation created to promote the commercial development of basketball within Great Britain.
- After four seasons in charge of Mersey Tigers, Head Coach Tony Garbelotto left the club at the end of the season to coach German Pro A team Heidelberg.

== BBL Championship (Tier 1) ==
=== Final standings ===
| Pos | Team | Pld | W | L | % | Pts |
|---|---|---|---|---|---|---|
| 1 | Newcastle Eagles | 30 | 23 | 7 | 0.766 | 46 |
| 2 | Leicester Riders | 30 | 22 | 8 | 0.733 | 44 |
| 3 | Worcester Wolves | 30 | 22 | 8 | 0.733 | 44 |
| 4 | Plymouth Raiders | 30 | 21 | 9 | 0.700 | 42 |
| 5 | Glasgow Rocks | 30 | 16 | 14 | 0.533 | 32 |
| 6 | Cheshire Jets | 30 | 13 | 17 | 0.433 | 26 |
| 7 | Sheffield Sharks | 30 | 13 | 17 | 0.433 | 26 |
| 8 | Guildford Heat | 30 | 12 | 18 | 0.400 | 24 |
| 9 | Milton Keynes Lions | 30 | 10 | 20 | 0.333 | 20 |
| 10 | Mersey Tigers | 30 | 10 | 20 | 0.333 | 20 |
| 11 | Durham Wildcats | 30 | 3 | 27 | 0.100 | 6 |

| = League winners |
| = Qualified for the play-offs |

=== Playoffs ===
Quarter-finals
1 | Newcastle Eagles | 93 | 74 | 167
8 | Guildford Heat | 56 | 69 | 125
3 | Worcester Wolves | 80 | 77 | 157
6 | Cheshire Jets | 80 | 87 | 167
2 | Leicester Riders | 92 | 90 | 182
7 | Sheffield Sharks | 76 | 65 | 141
4 | Plymouth Raiders | 84 | 60 | 144
5 | Glasgow Rocks | 79 | 80 | 159

Semi-finals
1 | Newcastle Eagles | 89 | 79 | 168
6 | Cheshire Jets | 99 | 64 | 163
2 | Leicester Riders | 76 | 97 | 173
5 | Glasgow Rocks | 77 | 72 | 149

Final
1 | Newcastle Eagles | 71
2 | Leicester Riders | 62

==== Quarter-finals ====
(1) Newcastle Eagles vs. (8) Guildford Heat

April 27, 2012

| Newcastle Eagles | 93–56 | Guildford Heat |

Sport Central, Newcastle upon Tyne

April 29, 2012

| Guildford Heat | 69–74 | Newcastle Eagles |
Newcastle wins on aggregate, 167–125

Surrey Sports Park, Guildford

(2) Leicester Riders vs. (7) Sheffield Sharks

April 27, 2012

| Sheffield Sharks | 76–92 | Leicester Riders |

English Institute of Sport, Sheffield

April 29, 2012

| Leicester Riders | 90–65 | Sheffield Sharks |
Leicester wins on aggregate, 182–141

Loughborough University, Loughborough

(3) Worcester Wolves vs. (6) Cheshire Jets

April 28, 2012

| Worcester Wolves | 80–80 | Cheshire Jets |

University of Worcester, Worcester

April 29, 2012

| Cheshire Jets | 87–77 | Worcester Wolves |
Cheshire wins on aggregate, 167–157

Northgate Arena, Chester

(4) Plymouth Raiders vs. (5) Glasgow Rocks

April 26, 2012

| Plymouth Raiders | 84–79 | Glasgow Rocks |

Plymouth Pavilions, Plymouth

April 29, 2012

| Glasgow Rocks | 80–60 | Plymouth Raiders |
Glasgow wins on aggregate, 159–144

Kelvin Hall, Glasgow

==== Semi-finals ====
(1) Newcastle Eagles vs. (6) Cheshire Jets

May 4, 2012

| Newcastle Eagles | 89–99 | Cheshire Jets |

Sport Central, Newcastle upon Tyne

May 6, 2012

| Cheshire Jets | 64–79 | Newcastle Eagles |
Newcastle wins on aggregate, 168–163

Northgate Arena, Chester

(2) Leicester Riders vs. (5) Glasgow Rocks

May 4, 2012

| Glasgow Rocks | 77–76 | Leicester Riders |

Kelvin Hall, Glasgow

May 6, 2012

| Leicester Riders | 97–72 | Glasgow Rocks |
Leicester wins on aggregate, 173–149

Loughborough University, Loughborough

==== Final ====
May 12, 2012
4.00pm GMT

Report

| Newcastle Eagles | 71–62 | Leicester Riders |
Scoring by quarter: 12–21, 19–10, 25–18, 15–13
| Pts: Charles Smith 21, Paul Gause 13, Darius Defoe 10, Joe Chapman 10. Andy Thomson 9, Fab Flournoy 8 Rebs: Fabulous Flournoy, 13; Asts: Charles Smith/Fabulous Flournoy, 4 | | Pts: Andrew Sullivan 18, Ayron Hardy 12, Bradd Wierzbicki 11, Brett Royster 6, Cameron Rundles 4, Barry Lamble 4, Reece Haggith 3, Jamell Anderson 2, Yorick Williams 2 Rebs: Ayron Hardy, 12; Asts: Ayron Hardy, 7 |

National Indoor Arena, Birmingham

== EBL National League Division 1 (Tier 2) ==
=== Final standings ===
| Pos | Team | Pld | W | L | % | Pts |
|---|---|---|---|---|---|---|
| 1 | London Leopards | 24 | 20 | 4 | 0.833 | 40 |
| 2 | Bristol Academy Flyers | 24 | 18 | 6 | 0.750 | 36 |
| 3 | Derby Trailblazers | 24 | 16 | 8 | 0.667 | 32 |
| 4 | Worthing Thunder | 24 | 16 | 8 | 0.667 | 32 |
| 5 | Bradford Dragons | 24 | 15 | 9 | 0.625 | 30 |
| 6 | Leicester Warriors | 24 | 15 | 9 | 0.625 | 30 |
| 7 | Reading Rockets | 24 | 14 | 10 | 0.583 | 28 |
| 8 | Medway Park Crusaders | 24 | 12 | 12 | 0.500 | 24 |
| 9 | Brixton TopCats | 24 | 11 | 13 | 0.458 | 22 |
| 10 | Leeds Carnegie | 24 | 10 | 14 | 0.417 | 20 |
| 11 | Tees Valley Mohawks | 24 | 4 | 20 | 0.167 | 8 |
| 12 | Westminster Warriors | 24 | 3 | 21 | 0.125 | 6 |
| 13 | PAWS London Capital | 24 | 2 | 22 | 0.083 | 4 |

| = League winners |
| = Qualified for the play-offs |

== EBL National League Division 2 (Tier 3) ==
=== Final standings ===
| Pos | Team | Pld | W | L | % | Pts |
|---|---|---|---|---|---|---|
| 1 | Team Northumbria | 20 | 18 | 2 | 0.900 | 36 |
| 2 | Hemel Storm | 20 | 16 | 4 | 0.800 | 32 |
| 3 | Glamorgan Gladiators | 20 | 14 | 6 | 0.700 | 28 |
| 4 | Birmingham Mets | 20 | 12 | 8 | 0.600 | 24 |
| 5 | Team Solent | 20 | 11 | 9 | 0.550 | 22 |
| 6 | Derbyshire Arrows | 20 | 10 | 10 | 0.500 | 20 |
| 7 | Eastside Eagles | 20 | 9 | 11 | 0.450 | 18 |
| 8 | London Westside | 20 | 9 | 11 | 0.450 | 18 |
| 9 | Mansfield Giants | 20 | 6 | 14 | 0.300 | 12 |
| 10 | London United | 20 | 3 | 17 | 0.150 | 6 |
| 11 | Birmingham A's | 20 | 2 | 18 | 0.100 | 4 |

| = League winners |
| = Qualified for the play-offs |

== BBL Cup ==
=== 1st round ===
October 29, 2011

| Durham Wildcats | 74–88 | Plymouth Raiders |

Newton Aycliffe Leisure Centre, Newton Aycliffe

October 29, 2011

| Worcester Wolves | 88–77 | Guildford Heat |

University of Worcester, Worcester

October 29, 2011

| Leicester Riders | 102–67 | Milton Keynes Lions |

John Sandford Centre, Leicester

October 30, 2011

| Glasgow Rocks | 78–60 | Edinburgh Kings |

Kelvin Hall, Glasgow

=== Quarter-finals ===
November 4, 2011

| Sheffield Sharks | 83–85 | Plymouth Raiders |

English Institute of Sport, Sheffield

November 11, 2011

| Mersey Tigers | 62–91 | Worcester Wolves |

Knowsley Leisure & Culture Park, Liverpool

November 11, 2011

| Newcastle Eagles | 78–75 | Glasgow Rocks |

Sport Central, Newcastle upon Tyne

November 13, 2011

| Cheshire Jets | 74–95 | Leicester Riders |

Northgate Arena, Chester

=== Semi-finals ===
Leicester Riders vs. Newcastle Eagles

November 26, 2011

| Leicester Riders | 90–90 | Newcastle Eagles |

John Sandford Centre, Leicester

December 2, 2011

| Newcastle Eagles | 71–63 | Leicester Riders |
Newcastle wins on aggregate, 161–153

Sport Central, Newcastle upon Tyne

Plymouth Raiders vs. Worcester Wolves

December 10, 2011

| Worcester Wolves | 83–111 | Plymouth Raiders |

University of Worcester, Worcester

December 11, 2011

| Plymouth Raiders | 82–89 | Worcester Wolves |
Plymouth wins on aggregate, 193–172

Plymouth Pavilions, Plymouth

=== Final ===
January 15, 2012
3.45pm GMT

Report

| Newcastle Eagles | 115–94 | Plymouth Raiders |
Scoring by quarter: 35–26, 28–26, 31–28, 21–20
| Pts: Charles Smith 39, Paul Gause 24, Andrew Bridge 16, Joe Chapman 15, Andrew Thomson 13, Darius Defoe 4, Fabulous Flournoy 4 Rebs: Fabulous Flournoy/Andrew Thomson, 7 Asts: Fabulous Flournoy, 5 | | Pts: Lehmon Colbert 25, Jeremy Bell 23, Anthony Rowe 20, Anthony Martin 13, Paul Williams 10, James Jones 3 Rebs: Lehmon Colbert/Anthony Rowe, 8 Asts: Anthony Martin, 6 |

National Indoor Arena, Birmingham

== BBL Trophy ==
=== Group stage ===
Group 1

| Team | Pts | Pld | W | L | Percent |
|---|---|---|---|---|---|
| 1.Newcastle Eagles | 6 | 4 | 3 | 1 | 0.750 |
| 2.Glasgow Rocks | 6 | 4 | 3 | 1 | 0.750 |
| 3.Durham Wildcats | 0 | 4 | 0 | 4 | 0.000 |

Group 3

| Team | Pts | Pld | W | L | Percent |
|---|---|---|---|---|---|
| 1.Milton Keynes Lions | 6 | 4 | 3 | 1 | 0.750 |
| 2.Leicester Riders | 6 | 4 | 3 | 1 | 0.750 |
| 3.London Leopards | 0 | 4 | 0 | 4 | 0.000 |

Group 2

| Team | Pts | Pld | W | L | Percent |
|---|---|---|---|---|---|
| 1.Sheffield Sharks | 8 | 4 | 4 | 0 | 1.000 |
| 2.Mersey Tigers | 2 | 4 | 1 | 3 | 0.250 |
| 3.Cheshire Jets | 2 | 4 | 1 | 3 | 0.250 |

Group 4

| Team | Pts | Pld | W | L | Percent |
|---|---|---|---|---|---|
| 1.Plymouth Raiders | 6 | 4 | 3 | 1 | 0.750 |
| 2.Worcester Wolves | 6 | 4 | 3 | 1 | 0.750 |
| 3.Guildford Heat | 0 | 4 | 0 | 4 | 0.000 |

=== Semi-finals ===
Newcastle Eagles vs. Sheffield Sharks

February 3, 2012

| Sheffield Sharks | 84–116 | Newcastle Eagles |

English Institute of Sport, Sheffield

February 10, 2012

| Newcastle Eagles | 104–84 | Sheffield Sharks |
Newcastle wins on aggregate, 220–168

Sport Central, Newcastle upon Tyne

Milton Keynes Lions vs. Plymouth Raiders

February 3, 2012

| Milton Keynes Lions | 87–81 | Plymouth Raiders |

Prestige Homes Arena, Milton Keynes

February 5, 2012

| Plymouth Raiders | 107–99 (OT) | Milton Keynes Lions |
Plymouth wins on aggregate, 188–186

Plymouth Pavilions, Plymouth

=== Final ===
First Leg
March 18, 2012
3.45pm GMT

Report

| Plymouth Raiders | 97–88 | Newcastle Eagles |
Scoring by quarter: 22–12, 19–12, 22–32, 34–20
| Pts: Michael Ojo 22, Jeremy Bell 21, Paul Williams 14, James Jones 14, Lehmon Colbert 13, Anthony Rowe 8 Jamal Williams 3, Anthony Martin 2 Rebs: Paul Williams, 18 | | Pts: Charles Smith 21, Andrew Thomson 16, Joe Chapman 14, Darius Defoe 12, Fab Flournoy 11, Paul Gause 10, Andrew Bridge 4 Rebs: Fabulous Flournoy, 8 |

Plymouth Pavilions, Plymouth

Second Leg
March 23, 2012
7.30pm GMT

Report

| Newcastle Eagles | 96–80 | Plymouth Raiders |
Scoring by quarter: 18–23, 37–23, 16–22, 25–17
| Pts: Paul Gause 19, Andrew Thomson 17, Charles Smith 16, Joe Chapman 16, Darius Defoe 14, Fab Flournoy 8, Andrew Bridge 6 Rebs: Andrew Thomson, 11 | | Pts: Jeremy Bell 29, Lehmon Colbert 13, Paul Williams 13, James Jones 11, Michael Ojo 7, Anthony Rowe 4, Jamal Williams 3 Rebs: Paul Williams, 15 |
Newcastle wins on aggregate, 184–177

Sport Central, Newcastle upon Tyne

== Statistics leaders ==
| Category | Player | Stat |
|---|---|---|
| Points per game | (United States) Demarius Bolds (Milton Keynes Lions) | 23.9 |
| Rebounds per game | (United States) Daniel Northern (Milton Keynes Lions) | 12.3 |
| Assists per game | (United States) Adam Brown (Cheshire Jets) | 5.0 |
| Steals per game | (United States) Demarius Bolds (Milton Keynes Lions) | 2.8 |
| Blocks per game | (United States) Bill Cole (Cheshire Jets) | 2.3 |

== Monthly awards ==
| Month | Coach | Player |
|---|---|---|
| October | (United States) (United Kingdom) Fabulous Flournoy (Newcastle Eagles) | (United States) Ayron Hardy (Leicester Riders) |
| November | (United States) (Italy) Rob Paternostro (Leicester Riders) | (United States) Mychal Green (Glasgow Rocks) |
| December | (United Kingdom) Gavin Love (Plymouth Raiders) | (United States) Richie Gordon (Worcester Wolves) |
| January | (United States) (United Kingdom) Fabulous Flournoy (Newcastle Eagles) | (United States) (United Kingdom) Charles Smith (Newcastle Eagles) |
| February | (United States) (United Kingdom) Fabulous Flournoy (Newcastle Eagles) | (United States) Tommy Freeman (Worcester Wolves) |
| March | (United Kingdom) Gavin Love (Plymouth Raiders) | (United States) Ayron Hardy (Leicester Riders) |
| April | (United Kingdom) John Lavery (Cheshire Jets) | (United States) Ayron Hardy (Leicester Riders) |

== Seasonal awards ==
- Molten Most Valuable Player: Joe Chapman (Newcastle Eagles)
- Molten Coach of the Year: Fabulous Flournoy (Newcastle Eagles)
- Team of the Year:
  - Cameron Rundles (Leicester Riders)
  - Joe Chapman (Newcastle Eagles)
  - Ayron Hardy (Leicester Riders)
  - Richie Gordon (Worcester Wolves)
  - Paul Williams (Plymouth Raiders)
- Defensive Team of the Year:
  - Paul Gause (Newcastle Eagles)
  - Demarius Bolds (Milton Keynes Lions)
  - Ayron Hardy (Leicester Riders)
  - Richie Gordon (Worcester Wolves)
  - Bill Cole (Cheshire Jets)
- British Team of the Year:
  - Myles Hesson (Mersey Tigers)
  - Tayo Ogedengbe (Guildford Heat)
  - Andrew Sullivan (Leicester Riders)
  - Anthony Rowe (Plymouth Raiders)
  - Andrew Thomson (Newcastle Eagles)

| Preceded by 2010–11 season | BBL seasons 2011–12 | Succeeded by 2012–13 season |
