= 2012–13 British Basketball League season =

2012–13 BBL season
- League: British Basketball League
- Sport: Basketball
- Duration: 21 September 2012 – 7 April 2013; 12 April 2013 – 28 April 2013 (Playoffs)
- Games: 33
- Teams: 12

Regular Season
- Top seed: Leicester Riders
- Season MVP: Andrew Sullivan (Leicester Riders)
- Top scorer: Chez Marks (Cheshire Phoenix)

BBL Tournaments
- BBL Playoffs champions: Leicester Riders
- BBL Playoffs runners-up: Newcastle Eagles
- BBL Cup champions: Leicester Riders
- BBL Cup runners-up: Newcastle Eagles
- BBL Trophy champions: Sheffield Sharks
- BBL Trophy runners-up: Leicester Riders

BBL seasons
- ← 2011–12 2013–14 →

The 2012–13 BBL season was the 26th campaign of the British Basketball League since the league's establishment in 1987. The season featured 12 teams from across England and Scotland including a new entrant, the reformed Manchester Giants, who were based on the original franchise of the same name that folded in 2001. East London Royals were due to become the 13th member of the League, but after their financial backing fell through weeks before the start of the season, the League deferred their entry until the 2013–14 season. The pre-season also saw long-time member franchise Milton Keynes Lions relocate to London and rebrand itself as the London Lions, whilst Cheshire Jets – encountering severe financial difficulties and threatened with the franchise being dissolved – were saved by campaigning local fans and businessmen and renamed as Cheshire Phoenix midway through the season.

The Championship regular season commenced on 21 September 2012 with reigning Champions Newcastle Eagles beginning the defence of their title with a 72–65 victory over Glasgow Rocks. The regular season saw all teams face each other three times during the campaign, playing either two games at home and once on the road or vice versa, with the top-eight placed teams advancing to the play-offs, which took place in April 2013. The season climaxed on 28 April with the showpiece Play-off Final, which returned to its former home at Wembley Arena, for the first time since 2002. Leicester Riders dominated the campaign, and were successful in three of the BBL's four annual competition's, claiming the League title, BBL Cup and Play-off title. Sheffield Sharks thwarted the possibility of a "clean sweep" with a victory against the odds over the Riders in the BBL Trophy Final.

== Teams ==
Locations of the 2012–13 BBL teams

Team	City/Area	Arena	Capacity	Last season
Cheshire Phoenix	Chester	Northgate Arena	1,000	6th
Durham Wildcats	Newton Aycliffe	Newton Aycliffe Leisure Centre	1,200	11th
Glasgow Rocks	Glasgow	Emirates Arena	6,500	5th
Leicester Riders	Leicester	John Sandford Centre	800	2nd
London Lions	London	Crystal Palace National Sports Centre	1,500	9th
Manchester Giants	Manchester	Wright Robinson College	900	New
Mersey Tigers	Liverpool	Knowsley Leisure & Culture Park	450	10th
Newcastle Eagles	Newcastle upon Tyne	Sport Central	3,000	1st
Plymouth Raiders	Plymouth	Plymouth Pavilions	1,480	4th
Sheffield Sharks	Sheffield	English Institute of Sport	1,200	7th
Surrey Heat	Guildford	Surrey Sports Park	1,000	8th
Worcester Wolves	Worcester	University of Worcester	600	3rd

== Notable occurrences ==
- New entrant Manchester Giants joined as the League's 12th franchise whilst East London Royals, who were due to become the 13th member, deferred entry to the 2013–14 season after their financial backing fell through prior to the start of the season. Reading Rockets also had a bid to join the league rejected earlier in the year.
- Although initially planning to enter as new franchises for the 2012–13 season, both BBL Birmingham and Essex Leopards postponed their entry until the 2013–14 season.
- Long-time member franchise Milton Keynes Lions relocated to London after their previous home venue was sold off by its owners, and rebranded itself as the London Lions. Initially they will use the Crystal Palace National Sports Centre for home games but will eventually move to the Copper Box – built for the 2012 Summer Olympics – from 2013.
- Guildford Heat rebranded its franchise as the Surrey Heat to reflect its geographical reach in terms of fan base and community programmes.
- New rules introduced prior to the start of the season now allows team's to field only a maximum of five non-British players per game (including up to three work permitted players), demonstrating the League's commitment towards developing British players.
- On 10 August, Cheshire Jets owner Pete Hawkins announced that the franchise was up for sale after negotiations with a proposed new owner collapsed. With the help of a "Save the Jets" campaign ran by local newspaper the Chester Chronicle, local businessman Haydn Cook stepped-in as the new owner of the franchise just weeks before the start of the new season, ensuring the immediate future of the franchise.
- More than 5,000 fans attended Glasgow Rocks' inaugural game at their new Emirates Arena home on 7 October. Glasgow were defeated 84–106 by arch-rivals Newcastle Eagles.
- After less than a month in the role, Cheshire's James Hamilton resigned as the team's player-coach on 15 October, due to his suspension following an altercation at a junior game.
- On 30 October it was announced that the Cheshire Jets franchise had been withdrawn by the League after new-owner Haydn Cook reported severe financial difficulties and requested to postpone upcoming fixtures and make all staff and players redundant with immediate effect. The following day it was revealed that the League had reinstated the franchise and would manage its operation centrally whilst trying to find a new owner. The club was temporarily renamed Cheshire Basketball Club as previous owner Cook retained the Jets name, logo, kits and branding. A "Save the Jets" campaign led by local fans and businessmen secured the required £50,000 needed to take over the franchise within the League's deadline of 30 November, and guaranteed the immediate future of the club. Renamed as Cheshire Phoenix, the franchise will operate as a not-for-profit Community Interest Club, whilst linking up with Chester (who faced a similar situation two years earlier) in a supporting partnership."
- Worthing Thunder – of the English Basketball League – became the first ever non-BBL team to progress past the 1st Round of the BBL Trophy after an 84–64 win at home to Mersey Tigers on 6 January 2013.
- Leicester Riders won their first silverware in 12 years on 13 January, with an 85–80 victory over Newcastle Eagles in the BBL Cup Final. Jay Cousinard, who scored 17 points, was named as the game's MVP.
- Leicester's 84–59 regular season victory over Manchester Giants on 19 February made the Riders only the fifth team in League history to go unbeaten for a whole year, having last been defeated on 25 February 2012 (Their upcoming schedule mean that the landmark date would pass before their next game).
- Sheffield Sharks claimed the BBL Trophy after a narrow two-point win over Leicester in front of over 5,000 fans at Glasgow's Emirates Arena, on 9 March. Sheffield's 71–69 victory prevented Leicester from winning a Cup-Trophy double, whilst it was Sharks' first Trophy final win for 15 years.
- Mersey Tigers secured the record for the longest losing-sreak in League history on 22 March. Their 92–79 defeat to Plymouth Raiders was their 31st consecutive loss, having last won a game against Milton Keynes on 15 April 2012.
- Leicester Riders were crowned League Champions for the first time in their history following their 93–70 home victory over Durham Wildcats on 31 March.
- Riders finished the campaign with a historic 65-57 win over Newcastle in the Play-off Final at a packed-out Wembley Arena on 28 April.

== BBL Championship (Tier 1) ==
=== Final standings ===
Pos	Team	Pld	W	L	%	Pts
1	Leicester Riders	33	30	3	0.909	60
2	Newcastle Eagles	33	25	8	0.758	50
3	Glasgow Rocks	33	21	12	0.636	42
4	Surrey Heat	33	21	12	0.636	42
5	Worcester Wolves	33	20	13	0.606	40
6	Plymouth Raiders	33	19	14	0.576	38
7	Sheffield Sharks	33	17	16	0.515	34
8	London Lions	33	13	20	0.394	26
9	Manchester Giants	33	12	21	0.364	24
10	Durham Wildcats	33	10	23	0.303	20
11	Cheshire Phoenix	33	10	23	0.303	20
12	Mersey Tigers	33	0	33	0.000	0

= League winners
= Qualified for the play-offs

=== Playoffs ===
Quarter-finals
1	Leicester Riders	70	73	143
8	London Lions	68	61	129
3	Glasgow Rocks	71	78	149
6	Plymouth Raiders	82	87	169
2	Newcastle Eagles	85	84	169
7	Sheffield Sharks	70	81	151
4	Surrey Heat	78	76	154
5	Worcester Wolves	81	70	151

Semi-finals
1	Leicester Riders	80	76	156
6	Plymouth Raiders	66	60	126
2	Newcastle Eagles	110	92	202
4	Surrey Heat	82	96	178

Final
1	Leicester Riders
2	Newcastle Eagles

==== Quarter-finals ====
(1) Leicester Riders vs. (8) London Lions

12 April 2013

London Lions	68–70	Leicester Riders

Crystal Palace National Sports Centre, London

13 April 2013

Leicester Riders	73–61	London Lions
Leicester wins on aggregate, 143–129

John Sandford Centre, Leicester

(2) Newcastle Eagles vs. (7) Sheffield Sharks

12 April 2013

Newcastle Eagles	85–70	Sheffield Sharks

Sport Central, Newcastle upon Tyne

15 April 2013

Sheffield Sharks	81–84	Newcastle Eagles
Newcastle wins on aggregate, 169–151

English Institute of Sport, Sheffield

(3) Glasgow Rocks vs. (6) Plymouth Raiders

14 April 2013

Glasgow Rocks	71–82	Plymouth Raiders

Emirates Arena, Glasgow

15 April 2013

Plymouth Raiders	87–78	Glasgow Rocks
Plymouth wins on aggregate, 169–149

Plymouth Pavilions, Plymouth

(4) Surrey Heat vs. (5) Worcester Wolves

13 April 2013

Worcester Wolves	81–78	Surrey Heat

University of Worcester, Worcester

14 April 2013

Surrey Heat	76–70	Worcester Wolves
Surrey wins on aggregate, 154–151

Surrey Sports Park, Guildford

==== Semi-finals ====
(1) Leicester Riders vs. (6) Plymouth Raiders

19 April 2013

Plymouth Raiders	66–88	Leicester Riders

Plymouth Pavilions, Plymouth

21 April 2013

Leicester Riders	76–60	Plymouth Raiders
Leicester wins on aggregate, 156–126

Sir David Wallace Centre, Loughborough

(2) Newcastle Eagles vs. (4) Surrey Heat

19 April 2013

Newcastle Eagles	110–82	Surrey Heat

Sport Central, Newcastle upon Tyne

21 April 2013

Surrey Heat	96–92	Newcastle Eagles
Newcastle wins on aggregate, 202–178

Surrey Sports Park, Guildford

==== Final ====
28 April 2013
3.00pm GMT

Report

Leicester Riders	68–57	Newcastle Eagles
Scoring by quarter: 22–11, 18–15, 17–15, 13–16
Pts: Andrew Sullivan, 24; Rebs: Jay Cousinard, 7 Asts: Andrew Sullivan, 6		Pts: Darius Defoe, 13; Rebs: Kareem Maddox, 8 Asts: Fabulous Flournoy/Damon Huffman, 4

Wembley Arena, London

== EBL National League Division 1 (Tier 2) ==
=== Final standings ===
Pos	Team	Pld	W	L	%	Pts
1	Reading Rockets	26	22	4	0.846	44
2	Bristol Academy Flyers	26	18	8	0.692	36
3	Team Northumbria	26	17	9	0.654	34
4	Tees Valley Mohawks	26	16	10	0.615	32
5	Leeds Carnegie	26	16	10	0.615	32
6	Essex Leopards	26	16	10	0.615	32
7	Worthing Thunder	26	13	13	0.500	26
8	Leicester Warriors	26	12	14	0.462	24
9	Medway Park Crusaders	26	12	14	0.462	24
10	Hemel Storm	26	11	15	0.423	22
11	Bradford Dragons	26	10	16	0.385	20
12	Westminster Warriors	26	10	16	0.385	20
13	Derby Trailblazers	26	6	20	0.231	12
14	Brixton TopCats	26	3	23	0.115	6

= League winners
= Qualified for the play-offs

== EBL National League Division 2 (Tier 3) ==
=== Final standings ===
Pos	Team	Pld	W	L	%	Pts
1	Newham Neptunes	22	17	5	0.773	34
2	Manchester Magic	22	15	7	0.682	30
3	Eastside Eagles	22	14	8	0.636	28
4	Derbyshire Arrows	22	13	9	0.591	26
5	Loughborough University	22	12	10	0.545	24
6	PAWS London Capital +	22	17	5	0.773	22
7	Glamorgan Gladiators	22	10	12	0.455	20
8	Mansfield Giants	22	8	14	0.364	16
9	London Westside	22	7	15	0.318	14
10	London United	22	7	15	0.318	14
11	Team Solent	22	4	18	0.182	8
12	Birmingham Mets	22	3	19	0.136	6

+ PAWS London Capital deducted twelve points for fielding an ineligible player during the 2011–12 season.

= League winners
= Qualified for the play-offs

== BBL Cup ==
The winners of the four 1st Round matches were joined by Newcastle Eagles, Leicester Riders, Plymouth Raiders and Worcester Wolves in the Quarter-finals, who received byes for finishing in the top four BBL Championship positions last season. The Final was played on 13 January 2013 at the National Indoor Arena in Birmingham.

=== 1st round ===
12 October 2012

Mersey Tigers	51–103	Surrey Heat

Knowsley Leisure & Culture Park, Liverpool

12 October 2012

Sheffield Sharks	90–59	Cheshire Jets

English Institute of Sport, Sheffield

14 October 2012

Glasgow Rocks	88–85	Manchester Giants

Emirates Arena, Glasgow

14 October 2012

London Lions	79–76	Durham Wildcats

Crystal Palace National Sports Centre, London

=== Quarter-finals ===
2 November 2012

Sheffield Sharks	72–71	Glasgow Rocks

English Institute of Sport, Sheffield

2 November 2012

Newcastle Eagles	107–85	Worcester Wolves

Sport Central, Newcastle upon Tyne

2 November 2012

London Lions	74–90	Leicester Riders

Crystal Palace National Sports Centre, London

3 November 2012

Surrey Heat	74–79	Plymouth Raiders

Surrey Sports Park, Guildford

=== Semi-finals ===
Plymouth Raiders vs. Newcastle Eagles

25 November 2012

Plymouth Raiders	90–107	Newcastle Eagles

Plymouth Pavilions, Plymouth

30 November 2012

Newcastle Eagles	83–91 (OT)	Plymouth Raiders
Newcastle wins on aggregate, 190–181

Sport Central, Newcastle upon Tyne

Sheffield Sharks vs. Leicester Riders

30 November 2012

Sheffield Sharks	70–90	Leicester Riders

English Institute of Sport, Sheffield

8 December 2012

Leicester Riders	75–45	Sheffield Sharks
Leicester wins on aggregate, 165–115

John Sanford Centre, Leicester

=== Final ===
13 January 2013
3.45pm GMT

Report

Leicester Riders	85–80	Newcastle Eagles
Scoring by quarter: 20–17, 25–19, 20–15, 20–29
Pts: Jay Cousinard, 17; Rebs: Anthony Rowe, 13; Asts: Andrew Sullivan, 5		Pts: Joe Chapman, 29; Rebs: Charles Smith, 7 Asts: Charles Smith, 6

National Indoor Arena, Birmingham

== BBL Trophy ==
The 12 BBL clubs were joined by Essex Leopards and Reading Rockets of the English Basketball League and Edinburgh Kings of the Scottish Basketball League to form a straight knock-out competition. Following the withdrawal of East London Royals prior to the start of the competition, Worthing Thunder from the English Basketball League were invited to take their place and play Mersey Tigers in the 1st Round. The first two rounds featured one-off games whilst the Semi-finals took place over two legs. The Final was held at the Emirates Arena in Glasgow and saw Sheffield Sharks claim their first Trophy in 15 years, after 71–69 victory over Leicester Riders.

=== 1st round ===
28 December 2012

London Lions	88–92	Cheshire Phoenix

Crystal Palace National Sports Centre, London

28 December 2012

Worcester Wolves	90–77	Plymouth Raiders

University of Worcester, Worcester

30 December 2012

Durham Wildcats	73–102	Newcastle Eagles

Newton Aycliffe Leisure Centre, Newton Aycliffe

30 December 2012

Essex Leopards	63–105	Leicester Riders

Brentwood Centre, Brentwood

3 January 2013

Manchester Giants	73–85	Sheffield Sharks

Wright Robinson College, Manchester

5 January 2013

Edinburgh Kings	61–72	Glasgow Rocks

Pleasance Sports Centre, Edinburgh

6 January 2013

Worthing Thunder	84–64	Mersey Tigers

Worthing Leisure Centre, Worthing

6 January 2013

Reading Rockets	68–86	Surrey Heat

Rivermead Leisure Complex, Reading

=== Quarter-finals ===
25 January 2013

Sheffield Sharks	84–81 (OT)	Glasgow Rocks

English Institute of Sport, Sheffield

1 February 2013

Surrey Heat	66–82	Leicester Riders

Surrey Sports Park, Guildford

8 February 2013

Newcastle Eagles	88–94	Worcester Wolves

Sport Central, Newcastle upon Tyne

9 February 2013

Worthing Thunder	61–106	Cheshire Phoenix

Worthing Leisure Centre, Worthing

=== Semi-finals ===
Cheshire Phoenix vs. Sheffield Sharks

24 February 2013

Cheshire Phoenix	60–74	Sheffield Sharks

Northgate Arena, Chester

1 March 2013

Sheffield Sharks	102–74	Cheshire Phoenix
Sheffield wins on aggregate, 176–134

English Institute of Sport, Sheffield

Leicester Riders vs. Worcester Wolves

1 March 2013

Worcester Wolves	73–82	Leicester Riders

University of Worcester, Worcester

2 March 2013

Leicester Riders	66–68	Worcester Wolves
Leicester wins on aggregate, 148–141

John Sandford Centre, Leicester

=== Final ===
9 March 2013
3.30pm GMT

Report

Sheffield Sharks	71–69	Leicester Riders
Scoring by quarter: 23–21, 16–15, 22–17, 10–16
Pts: B.J. Holmes, 25; Rebs: B.J. Holmes/Demetrius Jemison/Michael Tuck, 7 Asts: B.J. Holmes, 3		Pts: Jay Cousinard, 21; Rebs: Andrew Sullivan, 8 Asts: Jorge Calvo/Jay Cousinard/Andrew Sullivan, 2

Emirates Arena, Glasgow

== Statistics leaders ==
Category	Player	Stat
Points per game	(United States) Chez Marks (Cheshire Phoenix)	22.8
Rebounds per game	(United States) Kareem Maddox (Newcastle Eagles)	10.7
Assists per game	(United States) (United Kingdom) Ralph Bucci (Durham Wildcats)	5.5
Steals per game	(United States) Travis Holmes (Surrey Heat)	3.0
Blocks per game	(United States) Alif Bland (Cheshire Phoenix)	2.4
Field goal percentage	(United States) Demetrius Jemison (Sheffield Sharks)	61.0%
Free throw percentage	(United States) B.J. Holmes (Sheffield Sharks)	88.3%
Three-point field goal percentage	(Lithuania) Arnas Kazlauskas (Worcester Wolves)	44.6%

== Monthly awards ==
Month	Coach	Player
October	(United States) (Italy) Rob Paternostro (Leicester Riders)	(Republic of Ireland) Colin O'Reilly (Plymouth Raiders)
November	(United States) (United Kingdom) Sterling Davis (Glasgow Rocks)	(United States) Kareem Maddox (Newcastle Eagles)
December	(United States) (United Kingdom) Fabulous Flournoy (Newcastle Eagles)	(United States) (United Kingdom) Ralph Bucci (Durham Wildcats)
January	(United States) (Italy) Rob Paternostro (Leicester Riders)	(United States) (United Kingdom) Ralph Bucci (Durham Wildcats)
February	(United Kingdom) Paul James (Worcester Wolves)	(United States) Kareem Maddox (Newcastle Eagles)
March	(United States) (United Kingdom) Atiba Lyons (Sheffield Sharks)	(United States) Travis Holmes (Surrey Heat)

== Seasonal awards ==
- Molten Most Valuable Player: Andrew Sullivan (Leicester Riders)
- Molten Coach of the Year: Rob Paternostro (Leicester Riders)
- Molten Team of the Year:
  - Travis Holmes (Surrey Heat)
  - Andrew Sullivan (Leicester Riders)
  - Jay Cousinard (Leicester Riders)
  - Matt Schneck (Plymouth Raiders)
  - Kareem Maddox (Newcastle Eagles)
- Molten Defensive Team of the Year:
  - Andrew Sullivan (Leicester Riders)
  - Kareem Maddox (Newcastle Eagles)
  - Chavis Holmes (Surrey Heat)
  - Jay Cousinard (Leicester Riders)
  - Zaire Taylor (Leicester Riders)
- Molten British Team of the Year:
  - Andrew Sullivan (Leicester Riders)
  - Mike Tuck (Sheffield Sharks)
  - Sam Cricelli (Surrey Heat)
  - Orlan Jackman (London Lions)
  - Anthony Rowe (Leicester Riders)

Preceded by 2011–12 season	BBL seasons 2012–13	Succeeded by 2013–14 season
