= 2012–13 Surrey Heat season =

Surrey Heat
Season 2012-13
League	British Basketball League
Head Coach	(Zimbabwe) Creon Raftopoulos
Home Arena	Surrey Sports Park
League position	4th (out of 12)
BBL Cup	Quarter Final
BBL Trophy	Quarter Final
Play-Offs	Semi Final

The 2012–13 Surrey Heat season is the franchise's 8th season in the British Basketball League. It's the first season since being renamed as the Surrey Heat, having previously been called the Guildford Heat.

The Surrey Heat got their season off to the best possible start at the Surrey Sports Park when they comprehensively defeated the visiting Mersey Tigers. The final score was 106–45, which set all sorts of Heat franchise records. The Heat surpassed last year's highest score (which was 100, against an under-strength Newcastle Eagles in the last regular season game). In fact, it was the second highest output by the Heat in over three seasons and fell one point short of the most points scored against the Tigers, when the (then) Guildford Heat beat the (then) Everton Tigers 107–101 in the 2008–09 season.

However, it was the defensive performance which set the records tumbling. The 61 point margin of victory is a franchise high, easily surpassing the 49 point margin of victory achieved back in the 2007–08 season, when the Heat defeated the Worthing Thunder, 118–69, in the BBL Trophy (the Heat's highest-scoring game). The 45 points conceded was also a franchise low, beating the 52 points allowed in the 2009–10 season when the Heat notched up an 85–52 victory over the London Capital.

== BBL Championship ==
=== September 2012 ===
Date	Opponent	Venue	Result
Saturday 22nd	Mersey Tigers	Home	Won 106-45
Sunday 30th	Sheffield Sharks	Away	Won 81-69

=== October 2012 ===
Date	Opponent	Venue	Result
Friday 5th	London Lions	Away	Lost 95-91
Sunday 7th	Worcester Wolves	Home	Won 71-69
Sunday 14th	Sheffield Sharks	Home	Won 79-63
Sunday 21st	Glasgow Rocks	Home	Won 84-78
Sunday 28th	Plymouth Raiders	Away	Won 95-78

=== November 2012 ===
Date	Opponent	Venue	Result
Sunday 11th	Leicester Riders	Home	Won 81-74
Sunday 18th	Glasgow Rocks	Home	Lost 82-76
Friday 23rd	Mersey Tigers	Away	Won 74-54

=== December 2012 ===
Date	Opponent	Venue	Result
Saturday 1st	Manchester Giants	Home	Won 83-71
Sunday 9th	Durham Wildcats	Away	Won 91-74
Friday 14th	Newcastle Eagles	Away	Lost 89-80
Sunday 23rd	Sheffield Sharks	Home	Won 84-82

=== January 2013 ===
Date	Opponent	Venue	Result
Tuesday 1st	London Lions	Home	Won 96-73
Saturday 5th	Durham Wildcats	Home	Won 84-76
Friday 18th	Manchester Giants	Away	Lost 85-68
Sunday 20th	Leicester Riders	Away	Lost 88-58
Friday 25th	Worcester Wolves	Away	Won 97-91

=== February 2013 ===
Date	Opponent	Venue	Result
Friday 8th	Manchester Giants	Away	Lost 83-70
Saturday 16th	Plymouth Raiders	Away	Lost 91-89
Friday 22nd	Worcester Wolves	Away	Lost 99-81
Sunday 24th	Newcastle Eagles	Home	Lost 90-78

=== March 2013 ===
Date	Opponent	Venue	Result
Sunday 3rd	Cheshire Phoenix	Home	Won 87-78
Friday 8th	Cheshire Phoenix	Away	Won 100-94
Sunday 10th	Mersey Tigers	Home	Won 99-71
Saturday 16th	Leicester Riders	Home	Lost 79-76
Sunday 17th	Cheshire Phoenix	Away	Lost 104-100
Friday 22nd	Cheshire Phoenix	Home	Won 108-84
Sunday 24th	Durham Wildcats	Away	Won 99-87
Friday 29th	Glasgow Rocks	Away	Lost 98-70
Sunday 31st	London Lions	Home	Won 98-92

=== April 2013 ===
Date	Opponent	Venue	Result
Sunday 7th	Plymouth Raiders	Home	Won 101-99 (OT)

== BBL Cup ==
Date	Opponent	Venue	Result	Round
Saturday 3 November 2012	Plymouth Raiders	Home	Lost 79-74	Quarter Final

The Surrey Heat suffered a hard-fought 74–79 loss against the visiting Plymouth Raiders in the BBL Cup Quarter Final. And, to add injury to insult, they lost star player Martelle McLemore to an ankle injury in the second quarter. The Heat were led by Chavis Holmes’ 20 points to go with his eight assists. Frank Holmes added 17 points and nine rebounds to go with four blocks and Sam Cricelli had 14 points and seven rebounds.

== BBL Trophy ==
Date	Opponent	Venue	Result	Round
Sunday 6 January 2013	Reading Rockets	Away	Won 86-68	Round Of 16
Friday 1 February 2013	Leicester Riders	Home	Lost 82-66	Quarter Final

The Heat ran out 86–68 winners against the Reading Rockets in the round of 16, with Albert Margai leading the way with 16 points. In his last game for the Heat, Travis Holmes scored 15 points to go with his seven steals.

The Guildford Heat were led by Julius Joseph's 16 points, in the QF loss to the Leicester Riders. Chavis Holmes and Albert Margai had 12 each, and Frank Holmes had 17 rebounds. The Leicester Riders converted more than 50% of their shots. Jay Couisnard lead the way for the visitors with 22 points and seven rebounds.

== BBL Playoffs ==
Date	Opponent	Venue	Result	Round
Saturday 13 April 2013	Worcester Wolves	Away	Lost 81-78	Quarter-Final, First Leg
Sunday 14 April 2013	Worcester Wolves	Home	Won 76-70 (Heat win 154–151 on aggregate)	Quarter-Final, Second Leg
Friday 19 April 2013	Newcastle Eagles	Away	Lost 110-82	Semi-Final, First Leg
Sunday 21 April 2013	Newcastle Eagles	Home	Won 96-92 (Eagles win 202–178 on aggregate)	Semi-Final, Second Leg

== See also ==
- Basketball in England
- British Basketball League
- BBL Cup
- BBL Trophy
