= SYF =

SYF may refer to:

- Singapore Youth Festival, a biennial event in Singapore
- South Yorkshire Fencing, the organizing body for the sport of fencing in South Yorkshire
- Synchrony Financial (NYSE: SYF), an American consumer financial services company
