= Sheffield Sword Club =

Sheffield Sword Club is a fencing club that meets at the English Institute of Sport, Sheffield. The club encourages all ages and abilities, and runs regular beginner sessions throughout the year.

The club meets on a Thursday between Juniors 6–7.30pm & Seniors 7.30-10pm at the English Institute of Sport, Sheffield where sabre and épée are fenced.

== History ==
Sheffield Sword Club was first formed in 1910 and continued until 1984 when it separated and formed a couple of additional separate clubs, the main club fizzled out, the name remained unused until 2003 when it was reformed at the English Institute of Sport, Sheffield and since then has grown to be the largest club in the area. This was due in the main part to its principal coach, James Williams, whose reputation in the fencing world is second to none, and the work that he has done with the club, and the community. The club is one of the many clubs in the South Yorkshire Fencing network of clubs.

== Notable Fencers ==
Sheffield Sword Club has had a number of fencers who represented Great Britain (or their own nation) at Cadet (Under 17), Junior (Under 20), Senior and Veteran (Over 40) age groups.

Senior Representations

- Caitlin Chang (épée)
- Ellie Collier (sabre)
- Danniel Corcoran (sabre) (IRE)
- Ev van Gemeren (sabre)
- Pavel Guzanov (sabre) (LAT)
- Hannah Lawrence (épée)
- Stuart Marshall (sabre)
- Thomas Mottershead (sabre)
- Husayn Rosowsky (foil)
- Max Telfer (épée)
- James Williams (sabre)

== Notable Coaches ==
- Matt Haynes (2012 – Current)
- Kian Ryan (2012 – Current)
- James Williams who is a three time Olympian (2005-2010)
