= James Williams (British fencer) =

British fencer (1966–2024)

L. James Williams
Personal information
- Nationality: British (English)
- Born: 16 October 1966 Huddersfield, England
- Died: 12 May 2024 (aged 57)

Sport
- Sport: Fencing

James Williams (16 October 1966 – 12 May 2024) was a competitive fencer. He competed for Great Britain at the 1992 Olympic Games, 1996 Olympic Games and 2000 Olympic Games. Williams died on 12 May 2024, at the age of 57.

== Biography ==
Williams was born on 16 October 1966 in Huddersfield. He started fencing when he joined the Army Junior Leaders Regiment based in Dover, and was introduced to fencing by PTI and fencing coach, Les Welham. Soon afterwards he won the Army Fencing Championship and Master of Arms competitions. In 1996 and 2000, he won the sabre title at the British Fencing Championships.

Williams was coached by Péter Fröhlich for a number of years, and together with Ian Williams they ran a summer training camp at Grantham in the UK. He was highly regarded and involved at the top levels of fencing in Britain; he coached British Juniors at internationals in 2024, was the Team Manager for Team GB Fencing at the 2005 World Student Games in İzmir, Turkey and was responsible for Olympic Pathways and TASS program delivery, and was the Strength and Conditioning lead for GB Fencing. Williams coached at Sheffield Sword Club, where he was the principal coach until June 2010. Williams coached at City FC, MX Fencing and at Brentwood School.

== International competitions ==
Competition	Year	Result
World Championships Havana	2003	54
World Championships Lisbon	2002	L16
World Championships Nîmes	2001	
Olympic Games Sydney	2000	16th
World Championships Seoul	1999	
Commonwealth Fencing Federation Games (Kuala Lumpur)	1998	Individual Bronze; Team Gold (England)
World Championships Lisbon	1998	
World Championships Cape Town	1997	
Olympic Games Atlanta	1996	27th
World Championships The Hague	1995	
World Championships Athens	1994	
World Championships Essen	1993	
Olympic Games Barcelona	1992	Team 12th
