= Andrew Lasker =

American basketball player

No. 21 – Newcastle Eagles
- Position: Point Guard
- League: British Basketball League

Personal information
- Born: 20, November 1982 Houston, Texas, USA
- Listed height: 6 ft 2 in (1.88 m)

Career information
- College: Point Loma Nazarene
- Playing career: 2005–2021

Career history
- 2005–2010: Plymouth Raiders
- 2011: Newcastle Eagles
- 2011–2012: Guildford Heat
- 2012–2013: Plymouth Raiders
- 2013–2021: Newcastle Eagles

Career highlights
- 2x BBL Championship winner (2014, 2015); 1x BBL Championship Play-offs winner (2013); 3x BBL Trophy winner (2007, 2015, 2020); 4x BBL Cup winner (2015, 2016, 2017, 2021)

Andrew "Drew" Lasker (born November 20, 1982) is an American professional basketball player who played for the Newcastle Eagles in the British Basketball League (BBL).

Born in Katy, Texas, he attended Point Loma Nazarene University from 2002 to 2004. He began his basketball career in 2004 with the touring Athletes in Action team, an evangelical Christian sports ministry. In 2005, Lasker turned professional by signing for leading British team Plymouth Raiders and has since played for Newcastle Eagles. Known most notably for playing for the Guildford Heat, which Lasker states is his favourite club of all time.

At the start of the 2020–21 season, he launched and co-hosted 'The BBL Show', with former teammate and Plymouth Raiders Head Coach Jay Marriott, the official podcast of the British Basketball League.
