= East London Royals =

- League: British Basketball League
- Established: 2012
- History: East London Royals; 2012–present
- Arena: Mayesbrook Park Arena (Capacity: 2,000)
- Location: London, Greater London
- Team colours: Navy Blue and Gold
- Head coach: TBA
- Ownership: Mark Clark
- Website: EastLondonRoyals.com

East London Royals was a basketball club started by Humph Long producing many great cadet and junior basketball teams. The name was later taken by a British professional basketball team, based in the Barking & Dagenham area of London, England. The franchise was established in 2012 and admitted to the top-tier British Basketball League in the same year, originally planning to compete in the 2012-13 season. On 23 July 2013, it was announced that the Royals would use the Mayesbrook Park Arena at Sport House as its venue for home games, which will be set up to accommodate 2,000 spectators.

In September 2012 it was reported that the franchise's financial backing had fallen through, and a League statement followed announcing that the Royals would not take part in any competition's for the 2012–13 season and is instead planning for a 2013–14 season launch with "new investment, a community programme and a broader financial base."

Former players include current NFL American football player Jack Crawford.

== See also ==
- British Basketball League
