= Huddersfield Heat =

- League: English Basketball League
- Established: 1991
- Folded: 2014
- History: Huddersfield Heat; 1991–2014
- Arena: Park Lane Sports Centre (Capacity: 300)
- Location: Huddersfield, West Yorkshire
- Team colours: Red and White
- Head coach: (Spain) Eduardo Perez y Medina
- Website: HuddersfieldHeat.co.uk
Home	Away

Huddersfield Heat is a former semi-professional English basketball team that was based in Huddersfield, West Yorkshire. The club operated senior teams in both the Men's and Women's English Basketball League, most recently competing in Division Two and Division Two (North) respectively, before folding suddenly in 2014. The men's senior team were due to make their first appearance in Division One for the 2014–15 season.

== Franchise history ==
Originally formed in 1991 as a small local league club, the Heat have developed over the course of the past twenty years into an ambitious national league outfit. After a number of years spent competing in the lower ranks of the English Basketball League, the Men's team have advanced steadily in recent years, winning the Division 4 (North) north title in 2009-2010, and completing a league and cup double in 2012-2013, winning Division 3 (North) and the National Shield. As a result, the Men's team currently compete in the fully national Division Two.

With a Women's team joining the English Basketball League for the 2013–14 season, and plans underway for a new £4million Huddersfield Arena to become the club's new home, the club set their sights on turning fully professional and joining the ranks of the British Basketball League. However, following financial difficulties and the loss of a major sponsor, the Huddersfield Heat officially folded in 2014 prior to making their inaugural appearance in EBL Division One for the 2014–15 season.

== Home arena ==
Park Lane Sports Centre (1991–2014)
