= Paul Williams (basketball) =

American former basketball player

Personal information
- Born: March 5, 1961 (age 65) Phoenix, Arizona, U.S.
- Listed height: 6 ft 5 in (1.96 m)
- Listed weight: 200 lb (91 kg)

Career information
- High school: St. Mary's (Phoenix, Arizona)
- College: Arizona State (1979–1983)
- NBA draft: 1983: 2nd round, 45th overall pick
- Drafted by: Phoenix Suns
- Position: Small forward

Career history
- 1985–1986: Detroit Spirits

Career highlights
- First-team All-Pac-10 (1983)
- Stats at Basketball Reference

Paul Williams (born March 5, 1961) is an American former basketball player. Born in Phoenix, Arizona, he played at St. Mary's High School and led the school to its first boys basketball state championship during his final season. Williams played collegiately for the Arizona State Sun Devils, where he led the team in scoring and rebounding during his junior season in 1981–82. He was nominated to the All-Pac-10 team during his senior season.

Williams was selected by his hometown Phoenix Suns as the 45th pick of the 1983 NBA draft but never played in the National Basketball Association (NBA). He played the 1985–86 season for the Detroit Spirits of the Continental Basketball Association (CBA), averaging 14.1 points in 24 games.

== Career statistics ==
Legend
GP	Games played	GS	Games started	MPG	Minutes per game
FG%	Field goal percentage	3P%	3-point field goal percentage	FT%	Free throw percentage
RPG	Rebounds per game	APG	Assists per game	SPG	Steals per game
BPG	Blocks per game	PPG	Points per game	**Bold**	Career high

=== College ===
Year	Team	GP	GS	MPG	FG%	3P%	FT%	RPG	APG	SPG	BPG	PPG
1979–80	Arizona State	29	4	12.5	.445	–	.723	1.0	.6	.5	.1	4.8
1980–81	Arizona State	28	4	19.9	.457	–	**.760**	3.1	1.5	.6	.2	7.4
1981–82	Arizona State	27	26	**37.5**	.466	–	.689	5.8	**2.4**	1.1	**.3**	17.0
1982–83	Arizona State	**33**	**33**	35.5	**.521**	–	.684	**7.1**	2.1	**1.6**	.2	**19.7**
Career		117	67	26.5	.485	–	.700	4.3	1.6	1.0	.2	12.4
