= Durham Wildcats =

- League: NBL D3 North
- Established: 2005; 21 years ago
- History: Durham Wildcats; 2005-2015; Reformed; 2020-present
- Arena: Sport and Wellbeing Park
- Location: County Durham
- Team colours: Blue and White
Home	Away

The Durham Wildcats are an English basketball club based in Newton Aycliffe, County Durham. The original incarnation were members of the British Basketball League, the top-level competition in the United Kingdom, and played their home games at the Newton Aycliffe Leisure Centre. Established in 2005, the club enjoyed a rapid rise through the British basketball system with successive promotions, before applying to join the top-tier British Basketball League in 2011. The club completed four seasons in the BBL, but withdrew following the 2014-15 season. The newly reformed Wildcats re-entered the English Basketball League in 2020.

== Franchise history ==
In 2001, the merger of the Belmont Basketball Club and a group of U16 players from Belmont School resulted in a club that competed in the Durham County Local League playing with teams in the 1st and 3rd divisions. In 2005 Wildcats founded the team that would begin life in the EBL Division 3 North. The Wildcats achieved their first promotion four years later, finishing top of a highly competitive EBL Division 3 North, and gaining promotion to EBL Division 2.

In 2010, the Wildcats won their first national silverware beating Westminster Warriors in the Patron's Cup final (96-70) at the Crystal Palace National Sports Centre. The club went on to win the league title with an 18-2 record, gaining promotion to EBL Division 1, and beat Team Northumbria (70-67) in the Playoff final at the Amaechi Basketball Centre to complete the Division 2 treble. The Wildcats had a mixed inaugural season in Division 1, unable to emulate the success of the previous few seasons. A 7-11 record gave them a 7th-place finish, as well as early exits in the National Cup and post-season Playoffs.

After weeks of rumours, it was officially announced that the Wildcats would enter the British Basketball League following the withdrawal of Worthing Thunder.

After four seasons in the BBL, in July 2015 it was announced that the Wildcats would not be participating in the 2015-16 BBL season. The team had previously recruited players from Durham University, however following changes to visa regulations players called up to the team on international student visas were found to be ineligible to play. The team sought to re-structure and join the league at a later date.

== Home arenas ==
Spennymoor Leisure Centre (2005–2007 and 2009)
Newton Aycliffe Leisure Centre (2007–2015)
Durham University Sport and Wellbeing Park (2020–present)

== Season-by-season records ==
Season	Division	Tier	Regular Season						Post-Season	Trophy	Cup	Head coach
Season	Division	Tier	Finish	Played	Wins	Losses	Points	Win %	Post-Season	Trophy	Cup	Head coach
Durham Wildcats
2005–06	D3 Nor	4	6th	16	7	9	14	0.438	Did not qualify	2nd round (NS)	2nd round (NC)	Dave Elderkin
2006–07	D3 Nor	4	4th	20	13	7	26	0.650	Quarter-finals	3rd round (NS)	3rd round (NC)	Dave Elderkin
2007–08	D3 Nor	4	7th	20	11	9	22	0.550	Did not qualify	Quarter-finals (NS)	1st round (NC)	Dave Elderkin
2008–09	D3 Nor	4	1st	22	18	4	36	0.818	Semi-finals	3rd round (NS)	2nd round (NC)	Dave Elderkin
2009–10	D2	3	1st	20	18	2	36	0.900	Winners, beating Northumbria	Winners (PC)	Quarter-finals (NC)	Dave Elderkin
2010–11	D1	2	7th	18	7	11	14	0.389	Quarter-finals	1st round (NT)	3rd round (NC)	Dave Elderkin
2011–12	BBL	1	11th	33	3	30	6	0.090	Did not qualify	1st round (BT)	1st round (BC)	Dave Elderkin
2012–13	BBL	1	10th	33	10	26	20	0.303	Did not qualify	1st round (BT)	1st round (BC)	Dave Elderkin
2013–14	BBL	1	8th	33	14	19	28	0.424	Quarter-finals, losing to Newcastle Eagles	1st round (BT)	Quarter-finals (BC)	Lee Davie
2014–15	BBL	1	12th	36	8	28	16	0.286	Did not qualify	1st round (BT)	1st round (BC)	Lee Davie

== Trophies ==
- EBL Division 2:
  - Winners: 2009/10
- EBL Division 3 North:
  - Winners: 2008/09
- EBL Division 2 Play-offs:
  - Winners: 2009/10
- Patron's Cup:
  - Winners: 2009/10

== Players ==
=== Final roster ===
Note: Flags indicate national team, as has been defined under FIBA eligibility rules. Players may hold more than one non-FIBA nationality.

No.	Pos.	Nat.	Player
6	F	(England) ENG	Sam Chambers
8	F	(United States) USA	Kris Bennett
15	PF	(England) ENG	Joel Madourie
10	PG	(United States) USA	Chris Jones
13	F	(Croatia) CRO	Fran Urli
22	G	(Greece) GRE	Panos Mayindombe
32	G	(United Kingdom) GBR	Ralph Bucci
33	G	(United Kingdom) GBR	David Buchberger
44	C	(United States) USA	John Puk
