= Leicester Riders =

British professional basketball team

- League: SLB
- Established: 1967; 59 years ago
- History: Loughborough All-Stars (1967–1981); Leicester All-Stars (1981–1986); Leicester City Riders (1986–1997); Leicester Riders (1997–present)
- Arena: Mattioli Arena
- Capacity: 2,400
- Location: Leicester, Leicestershire
- Team colours: Red, black, white
- Main sponsor: Jelson Homes
- Head coach: Rob Paternostro
- Ownership: Kevin Routledge
- Championships: Men: 1 SLB Playoffs; 6 BBL Championship; 6 BBL Playoffs; 3 BBL Cup; 3 BBL Trophy; 1 National Cup; Woman: 1 WBBL Cup; 3 WBBL Trophy
- Website: LeicesterRiders.co.uk
Home	Away

The Leicester Riders are a British professional basketball team based in Leicester, United Kingdom, the oldest in the British Basketball League (BBL). The Riders compete in the Super League Basketball (SLB). Established in 1967, the club have played in various locations around Leicestershire before moving to their current purpose-built home venue, the Mattioli Arena, in 2016.

== History ==
The Loughborough All-Stars, as the Leicester Riders were originally known, were founded by students and lecturers at Loughborough University on 26 April 1967. They were founding members of the National Basketball League in 1972, and the British Basketball League (BBL) in 1987. They are the oldest club in the British Basketball League.

The club moved from Loughborough to Leicester in 1981, backed by Leicester City Council and Leicester City Bus (hence the change in nickname to "Riders"), before moving back to play at Loughborough University in 2000, following the closure of Granby Halls, at a new venue barely a stone's throw from Victory Hall where the club played its first game.

In 2004 the Riders agreed a sponsorship deal with De Montfort University (DMU) and moved back to Leicester, where they played their games at the DMU's John Sandford Sports Centre.

Following a difficult period for the club financially between 2005 and 2007, former director of the team, Mike Steptoe, and the supporters club formed a consortium which raised enough money to keep the side running. Then local business Jelson Homes stepped forward to sponsor the club and the appointment of general manager Russell Levenston began a turning point for the club. Part of the sponsorship deal with Jelson Homes was to ensure the future of the club by investing in 'basketball in the community' schemes, providing the youth of Leicester with basketball coaching programmes, such as the "Shoot to the Future" programme, run with the support of the Police.

Former Riders logo

Riders also now have an extensive youth programme for boys and girls, a Women's team near the top of England Basketball's Division One, one of the country's largest Basketball Apprentice schemes at Charnwood College, and a partnership with Loughborough University, led by the Great Britain men's captain Drew Sullivan, and which includes a GB Futures player, Jamell Anderson, two Great Britain Under 20 men's internationals and two Great Britain Under 20 women's internationals, as well as a number of boys and girls in England Under age international teams. Membership in the club is expected to reach nearly 1,500 this season. The club's community programmes reach nearly 15,000 young people in the City and County.

The Jelson Homes DMU Leicester Riders won the BBL Cup by defeating the Newcastle Eagles 85–80 at the National Indoor Arena in Birmingham on 13 January 2012. The match, attended by 7,500 spectators and broadcast live on Sky TV, marked the Riders’ first major trophy since winning both the Cup and the Playoff finals in 2001.

After winning the treble in the 2016–17 and 2017–18 season, Leicester applied for the following Basketball Champions League season. This marked the first European participation of a British team since Guildford Heat featured in the ULEB Cup in 2007. In the first qualifying round, Leicester was eliminated by Danish side Bakken Bears, thus being demoted to the season's FIBA Europe Cup, where they lost all six group stage games.

== Home arenas ==
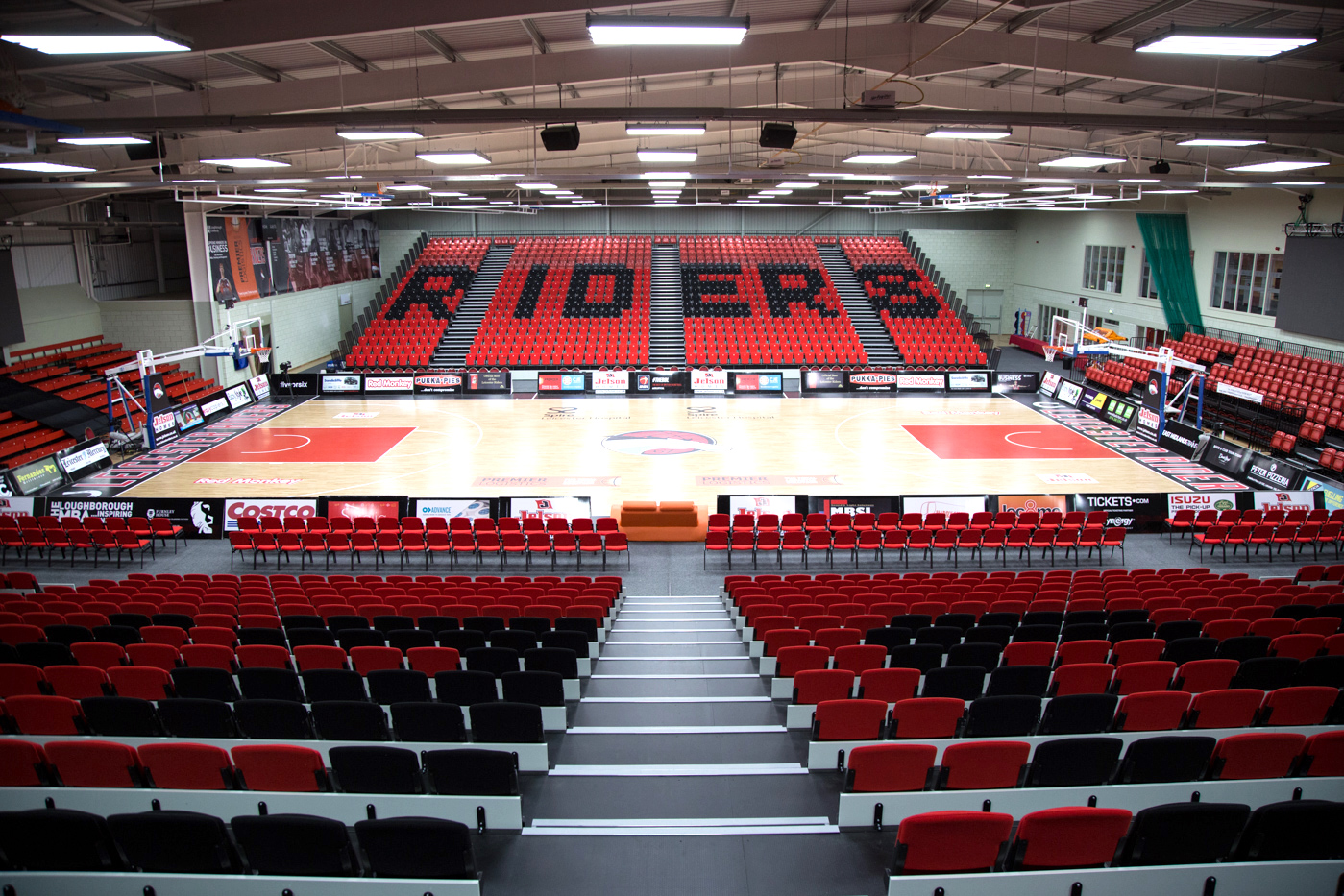
The Mattioli Arena, used since 2016

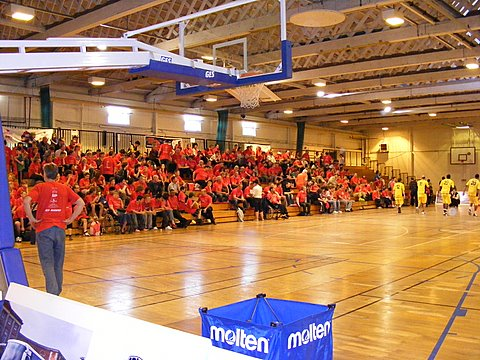
John Sandford Sport Centre, former home of the Leicester Riders.

The team has been based at the purpose-built Mattioli Arena since 2016 (from 2018 to 2024, the arena was known as the Morningside Arena). The £4.8 million arena, which is owned by the Leicester Riders Foundation, was officially opened in January 2016. It hosted its first game on 30 January 2016, in a quarter-final match between Leicester Riders and Surrey Scorchers in the British Basketball League Trophy, won by the Riders 77–60.

A list of all home arenas the club has had:

- Victory Hall (1967–1981)
- Granby Halls (1981–2000)
- Sir David Wallace Centre (2000–2004)
- John Sandford Centre (2004–2014)
- Sir David Wallace Centre (2014–2016)
- Mattioli Arena (2016–present)

== Season-by-season records ==
=== SLB season-by-season ===
Champions	SLB champions	Runners-up	Playoff berth

Season	Tier	League	Regular season					Postseason	Cup	Trophy	Head coach
Season	Tier	League	Finish	Played	Wins	Losses	Win %	Postseason	Cup	Trophy	Head coach
Leicester Riders
2024–25	1	SLB	2nd	32	23	9	.719	Champions	Semifinals	Semifinals	Rob Paternostro
2025–26	1	SLB	5th	32	15	17	.469	Semifinals	Quarterfinals	Did not qualify	Rob Paternostro
Championship record				64	38	26	.594	0 championships			
Playoff record				9	5	4	.556	1 playoff championships			

== Honours ==
SLB Playoffs

- Winners (1): 2024–25

British Basketball League

- Winners (6): 2012–13, 2015–16, 2016–17, 2017–18, 2020–21, 2021–22
- Runners Up (4): 2011–12, 2014–15, 2018–19, 2022–23

BBL Play-offs

- Winners (6): 2000–01, 2012–13, 2016–17, 2017–18, 2018–19, 2021–22
- Runners Up (3): 2011–12, 2015–16, 2022–23

Women's British Basketball League

- Runners Up (4): 2016–17, 2017–18, 2018–19, 2020–21

WBBL Play-offs

- Runners Up (3): 2017–18, 2018–19, 2022–23

BBL Cup

- Winners (3): 2012–13, 2013–14, 2021–22
- Runners Up (2): 2015–16, 2022–23

WBBL Cup

- Winners (1): 2020–21
- Runners Up (1): 2022–23

BBL Trophy

- Winners (3): 2015–16, 2016–17, 2017–18
- Runners Up (4): 1991–92, 2005–06, 2012–13, 2014–15

WBBL Trophy

- Winner's (3): 2017–18, 2018–19, 2019–20
- Runner's Up (2): 2016–17, 2022–23

National Cup (predecessor of the BBL Cup)

- Winners (1): 2000–01
- Runner's Up (3): 1983–84, 1990–91, 1997–98

== Players ==
=== Current roster ===
Note: Flags indicate national team eligibility at FIBA-sanctioned events. Players may hold other non-FIBA nationalities not displayed.

Leicester Riders roster
Players
Coaches

Pos.	No.	Nat.	Name	Ht.	Wt.	Age
F	2	(United States)	Shelton, Duke	2.06 m (6 ft 9 in)	98 kg (216 lb)	30 – 25 November 1995
F	5	(United Kingdom)	Onyia, Edward	1.98 m (6 ft 6 in)		21 – 7 September 2005
G	6	(United Kingdom)	Curran, Oscar	1.88 m (6 ft 2 in)
F	7	(United Kingdom)	Bowman, Blake	1.99 m (6 ft 6 in)	93 kg (205 lb)	24 – 8 December 2001
F	11	(Australia) (United Kingdom)	Abercrombie, Riley	2.06 m (6 ft 9 in)	100 kg (220 lb)	26 – 11 November 1999
G	12	(United States)	Hunter, Jaylin	1.82 m (6 ft 0 in)	88 kg (194 lb)	25 – 13 November 2000
G	13	(United Kingdom)	Washington, Conner	1.83 m (6 ft 0 in)	83 kg (183 lb)	34 – 4 June 1992
G	14	(United States)	Wright, Ethan	1.91 m (6 ft 3 in)	88 kg (194 lb)	26 – 14 August 2000
G	20	(United States)	Johnson, Spencer	1.96 m (6 ft 5 in)	84 kg (185 lb)	28 – 3 September 1998
F	25	(United Kingdom)	Ndoukou, Victor	2.04 m (6 ft 8 in)	107 kg (236 lb)	23 – 25 February 2003
F	32	(United States)	Thompson, Charles	2.01 m (6 ft 7 in)	112 kg (247 lb)	25 – 13 February 2001
F	33	(United States)	Brooks, J'Raan	2.06 m (6 ft 9 in)	95 kg (209 lb)	27 – 13 May 1999
F	43	(United Kingdom)	Wylie, Seth	1.88 m (6 ft 2 in)	93 kg (205 lb)	22 – 21 November 2003

Head coach

- (United States) Rob Paternostro

Assistant coach(es)

- (Spain) Pablo Vázquez
- (United Kingdom) Will Maynard

Legend

- (C) Team captain
- Injured

=== Notable players ===
Note: Flags indicate national team eligibility at FIBA-sanctioned events. Players may hold other non-FIBA nationalities not displayed.

Criteria

To appear in this section a player must have either:

- Set a club record or won an individual award while at the club
- Played at least one official international match for their national team at any time
- Played at least one official NBA match at any time.

- (United Kingdom) David Aliu 1 season: '06–'07
- (United Kingdom) Andy Betts 1 season: '93–'94
- (United Kingdom) Steve Bucknall 2 seasons: '05–'07
- (United Kingdom) Nate Reinking 1 season: '06–'07
- (Republic of Ireland) Aaron Westbrooks
- (Barbados) Andrew Alleyne 1 season: '06–'07
- (Trinidad and Tobago) Shawn Myers 1 season: '06–'07
- (United States) Geno Crandall
- (United States) Olly Dunmore 1 season: '05–'06
- (United States) Billy Singleton 4 seasons: '97–'99, '00–'02
- (United States) John Trezvant
- (United States) Tony Windless 3 seasons: '08–'11
- (United States) Ryan Zamroz 1 season: '10–'11

== See also ==
- Leicester Riders (women)
- Sport in Leicester
