= South Yorkshire Fencing =

South Yorkshire Fencing (SYF) is the organizing body for the sport of fencing in South Yorkshire. It's a not-for-profit organization designed to promote the sport of fencing in the geographical area of South Yorkshire, and in particular in the high population density areas of Barnsley, Doncaster, Rotherham and Sheffield.

== History ==
South Yorkshire Fencing was set up in 2008 with the aim of developing Fencing within the South Yorkshire area, particularly in the areas of Club Development, Coach and Volunteer Training, and Schools Delivery.

== Activities of SYF ==
Club Development – The main aims of the club development strand are to build capacity and also to encourage a robust governance within clubs. South Yorkshire Fencing supports clubs in achieving SwordMark – ClubMark for fencing.

Coach and Volunteer Training – SYF have run a number of child protection courses, as well as signposted coaches and volunteers to additional training sessions. Coach specific training has been run, and a number of coaches have been awarded their Coach status as a result. SYF are also delivering Sports Leaders Awards in Go/Fence.

Schools Delivery Sessions – SYF have run sessions as both curriculum time activities and lunch time and after school sessions in schools at infant, primary and secondary levels.

== 2011 European Senior Fencing Championships Legacy Programme ==
The 2011 European Senior Fencing Championships are being run at the EIS in Sheffield from 14 to 19 July 2011. As a part of this competition a legacy programme has been set up which comprises:

- Legacy coaching sessions in schools
- Legacy coaching sessions at the competition
- Schools competition visits
- Schools After-School clubs and a network of School Hub Clubs linked to Community Fencing Clubs (2011–2012)
- Volunteers Programme
- Coach Education

All of these sessions will have input from SYF, as they are already aligned to deliver similar outcomes.
