= Molten Corporation =

Japanese sports brand

- Native name: 株式会社モルテン
- Type: Private KK
- Industry: Sports equipment
- Founded: 1 November 1958; 68 years ago
- Headquarters: Yokogawa Shin-machi, Nishi-ku, Hiroshima, 733-0013, Japan
- Area served: Worldwide
- Key people: Kiyo Tamiaki (President and CEO)
- Products: List: Sports equipment; Automotive parts; Building materials; Nursing and welfare equipment
- Number of employees: 3,900 (consolidated, as of 31 March 2015)
- Website: molten.co.jp

Molten Corporation (Japanese: 株式会社モルテン, Hepburn: Kabushiki-gaisha Moruten) is a Japanese sports equipment and automotive parts company based in Hiroshima, Japan.

Molten is mostly known for manufacturing balls for several team sports, with a range of products that includes American footballs, association footballs, basketballs, dodgeballs, handballs and volleyballs. Notably, Molten basketballs are the official balls for all FIBA worldwide competitions, and numerous domestic leagues outside of North America.

Molten is also the official volleyballs producer for USA Volleyball and the NCAA men's and women's championships.

== History ==
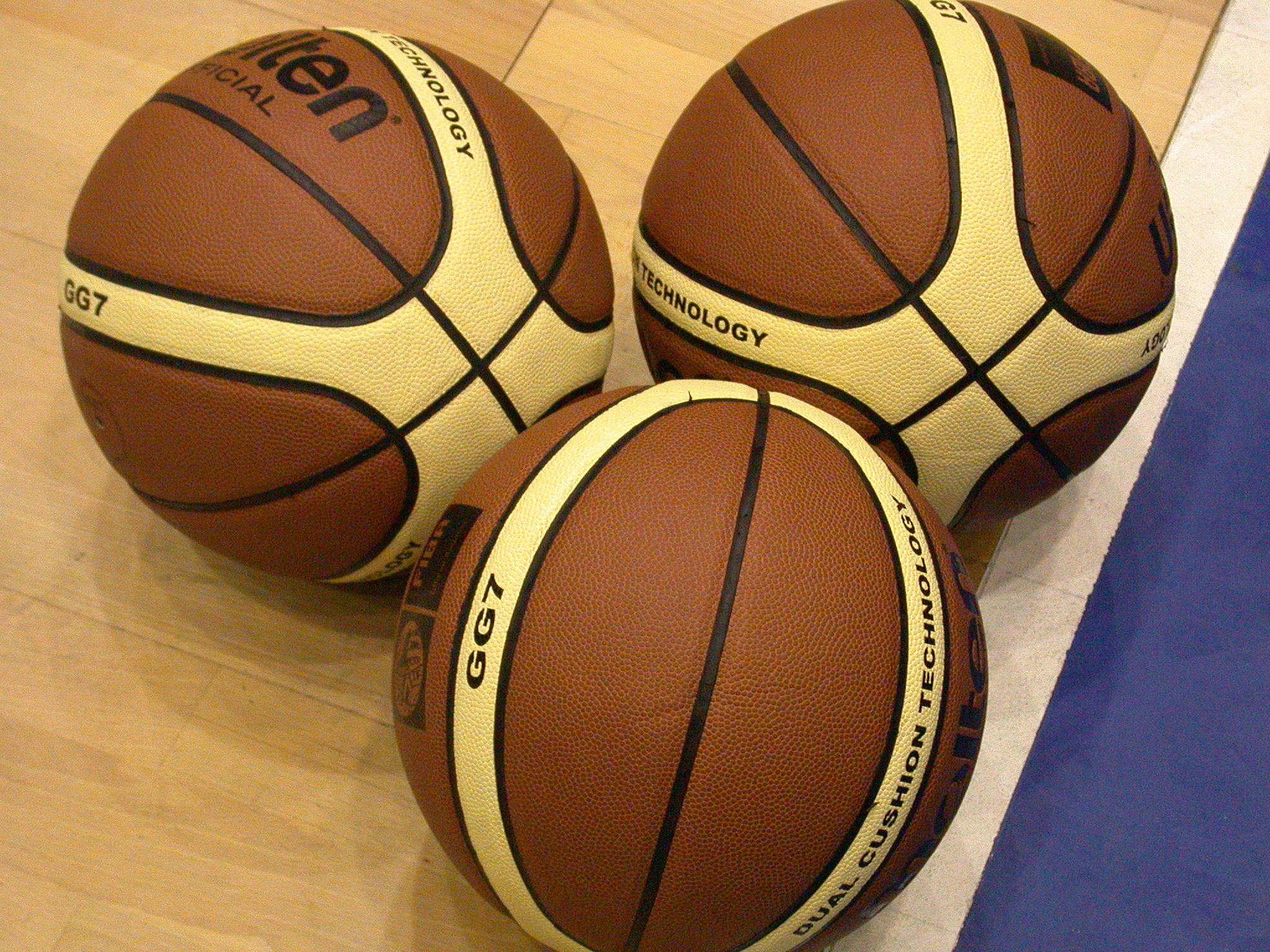
FIBA basketballs

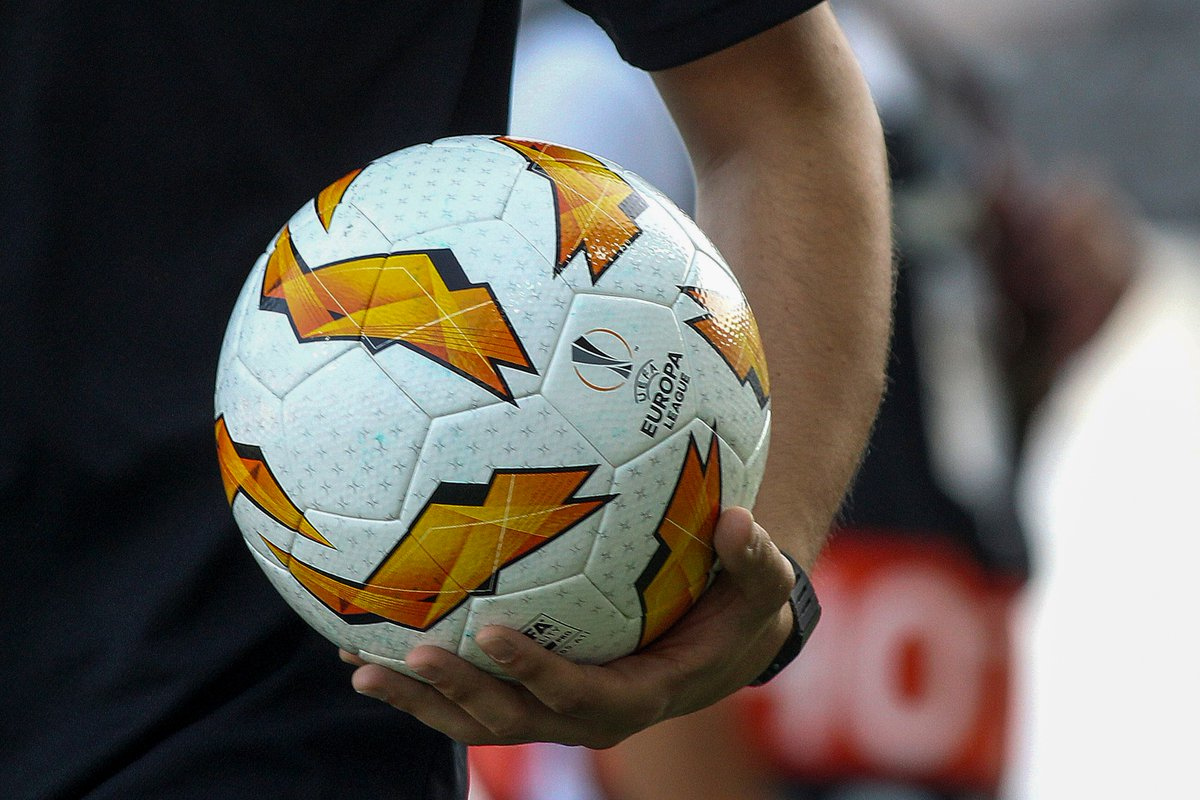
UEFA Europa League match ball

Founded in 1958, Molten is the world's largest ball and sports equipment manufacturer. Molten USA, Inc. was established in 1983 to bring these quality sports balls to the U.S. marketplace. Originally located in Southern California, Molten USA moved to northern Nevada in 1988 and continues to call the Reno–Sparks area its home.

Only six years after their founding, Molten basketballs and soccer balls were the official balls of the 1964 Tokyo Olympics. Molten has been the official basketball for the Olympic Games in Los Angeles (1984), Seoul (1988), Barcelona (1992), Atlanta (1996), Sydney (2000), Athens (2004), Beijing (2008), London (2012) and Rio (2016). Molten basketballs have also been the official ball for the International Basketball Federation (FIBA) for the past 30 years culminating in the Men's and Women's World Basketball Championship. This championship was held in the U.S. for the first time in Indianapolis in August 2002.

Molten volleyballs became the official ball for the U.S. national teams in 1997 and the boys' and girls' junior national teams in 2001. Presently clubs, regions, high schools, colleges and tournaments throughout the U.S. use Molten volleyballs.

Through the 2006-07 season, Molten supplied balls for the elite Europe-wide Euroleague, but the league's organizing body, Euroleague Basketball (company), switched to Nike as its basketball supplier.

In their first involvement in association football, the company offered its technology to the Teamgeist project and supplied the official football as OEM to Adidas for the 2006 FIFA World Cup. Since 2012, Molten have been supplying Alashkert, a soccer club from the Armenian Premier League.

=== AFC ===
Starting from 2019, Molten will supply official match ball for all Asian Football Confederation (AFC) club and national team tournaments, including the 2019 AFC Asian Cup. The Molten Acentec was specifically designed for the Asian Cup, based on Vantaggio 5000. The partnership didn't continue in the 2023 AFC Asian Cup as the AFC has appointed Kelme to supply the match ball for the tournament. However Molten still supply the match balls in other AFC-sanctioned national team tournaments.

Molten's initial involvement in AFC's club competitions excluded the AFC Champions League, as Molten provides Adidas match balls (Molten are the official manufacturer and distributor of Adidas footballs in Japan). However, since 2021 season the AFC Champions League are also using Molten-branded match balls after Molten extended a three-year deal with the confederation until 2024.

=== Bangladesh ===
Molten became Bangladesh Football Federation's official ball partner. The agreement was signed on 19 May 2025 in Dhaka. Balls from Molten will be used for

- Bangladesh national football team
- Bangladesh women's national football team
- Bangladesh Premier League
- Federation Cup
- Independence Cup
- Bangladesh Challenge Cup and Bangladesh Super Cup.
- More completions running by BFF in Bangladesh

=== UEFA Europa and the Europa Conference League ===
On 23 October 2017, UEFA has announced that Molten Corporation had signed a three-year agreement to become the official match ball supplier for the UEFA Europa League -- replacing Adidas -- through seasons 2018–19, 2019–20 and 2020–21. "Molten UEFA Europa League" is the name of the official match balls of the tournament during the three-year contract. These footballs derive from the Molten Vantaggio 5000 -- a high quality FIFA and NFHS Approved match ball -- albeit with custom design resembling Europa League's branding.

On 4 February 2021, Molten and the UEFA has reached an agreement to extend the three-year contract to become the official match ball suppliers for the UEFA Europa League and newly created UEFA Europa Conference League. Molten's partnership in those tournaments will end at the conclusion of the 2023-24 season as Decathlon's Kipsta will take over in the subsequent seasons.

=== CONCACAF ===
On 20 February 2024 Molten and CONCACAF has agreed to multi-year confederation-wide Match Ball supplier partnership, replacing Nike.

=== Domestic leagues ===
In the past decade, Molten has increased its prominence in the world of football, becoming the official supplier of match balls for various leagues and domestic competitions, as well as a technical supplier for various clubs all over the world.

- (Chile) Liga de Primera (Official match balls)
- Primera División de El Salvador (Official match balls)
- (Guatemala) Liga Guate (Official match balls)

=== Basketball national teams ===
Molten was the provider of uniforms to Malaysia's national basketball team at the 2021 FIBA Asia Cup qualification.
