= Newton Aycliffe Leisure Centre =

Multi-sport venue in Newton Aycliffe, England

Coordinates: 54.6194°N 1.574°W

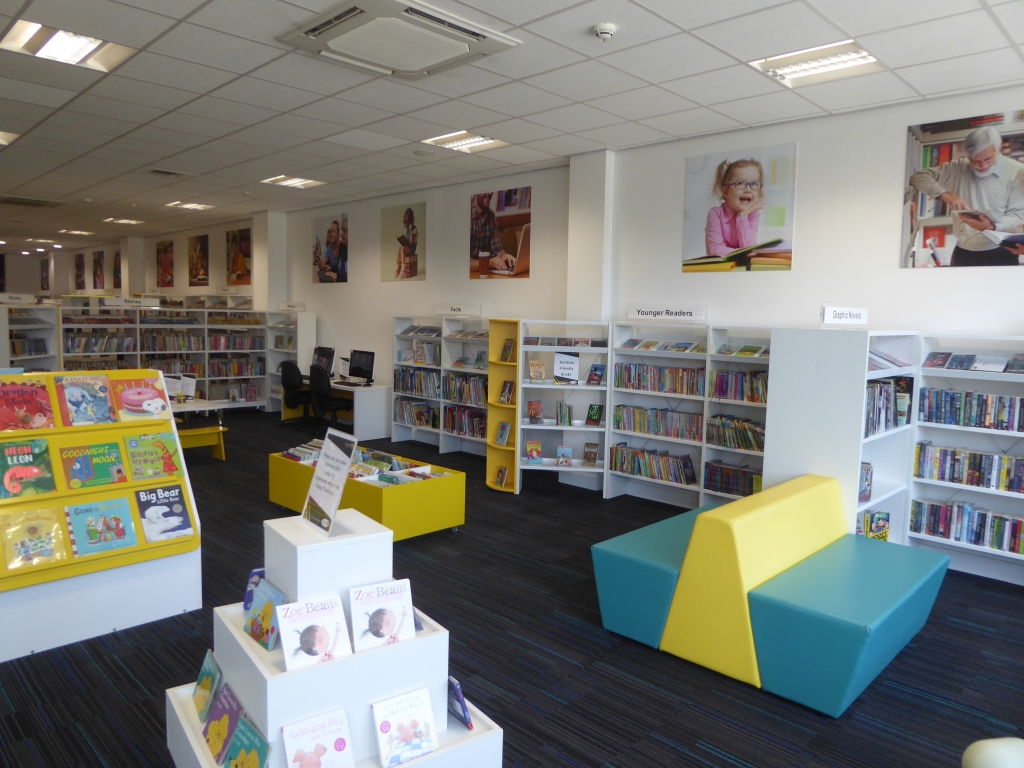
The Newton Aycliffe Library which is co-located with the leisure centre in Newton Aycliffe, County Durham.

Newton Aycliffe Leisure Centre is a multi-sport venue and leisure facility, located in Newton Aycliffe, County Durham. The centre was opened in 1974 and has facilities for swimming, exercise, an indoor climbing wall, and a main sports hall for sports such as basketball, badminton and indoor football.

The main hall is used as the home venue for British Basketball League team Durham Wildcats, who have been using the venue consistently since 2007 having previously been based in Spennymoor. The venue has a maximum capacity for 1,200 people, with bleacher-style seating on three sides of the court.

== See also ==
- Durham Wildcats
