= English Institute of Sport, Sheffield =

Multi-sport facility in Sheffield, South Yorkshire, England

English Institute of Sport
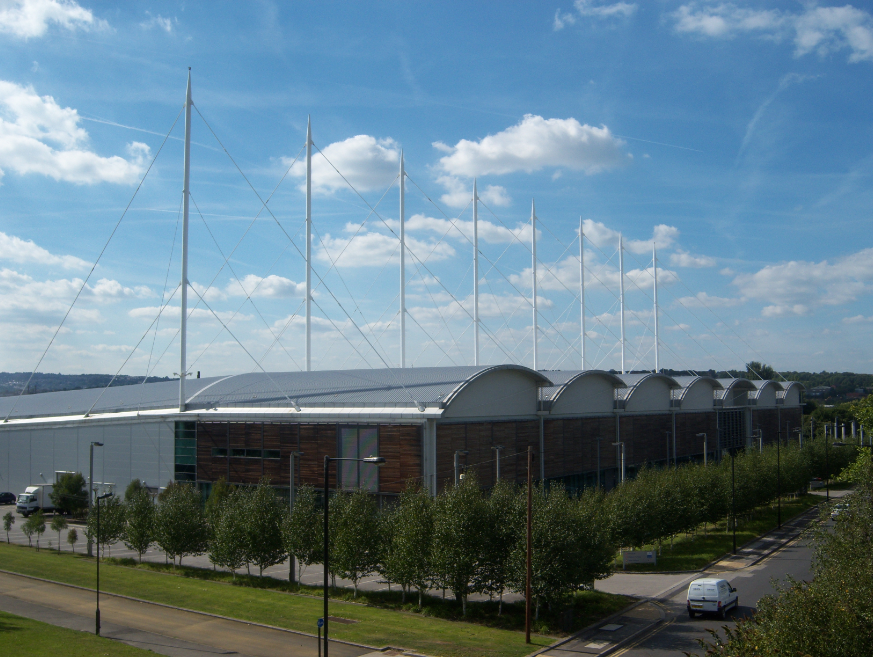
- Exterior shot of EIS
- Interactive map of English Institute of Sport
- Full name: English Institute of Sport Sheffield
- Address: Coleridge Road, S9 5DA
- Location: Sheffield, England
- Coordinates: 53°23′54″N 1°25′28″W
- Owner: Sheffield City Council
- Operator: Everyone Active
- Public transit: Y TT; Arena / Olympic Legacy Park

Construction
- Opened: December 2003
- Architect: FaulknerBrowns

The English Institute of Sport is a multi-sport facility in Sheffield, South Yorkshire, England. Its main feature is a 200m indoor track, but it also hosts several other sporting arenas as well as a large gym and extensive sports medicine facilities. It is located in the Lower Don Valley between the Sheffield Arena and Don Valley Bowl.

== Sports ==
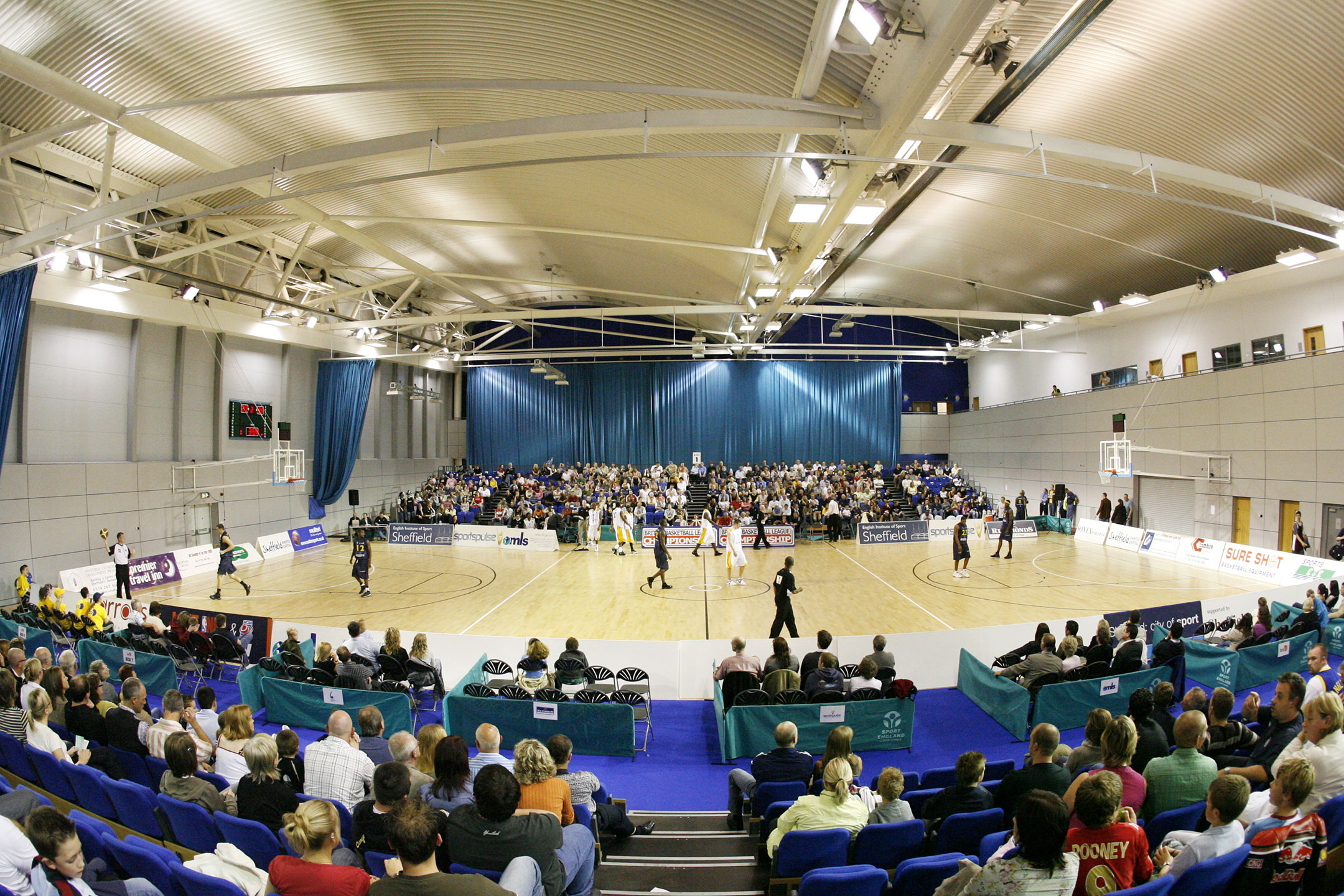
Interior of the main sports hall

The facility is the training venue of choice for a number of sports including athletics, basketball, boxing, fencing, futsal, judo, netball, table tennis and volleyball.

There are many clubs which meet at the venue including City of Sheffield Athletic Club, Sheffield Futsal Club, Sheffield Stormers Netball Club Sheffield Sword Club, Concorde Netball Club, England Netball, and England Volleyball, as well as hosting snooker's main professional academy. The centre also often hosts sports days for local secondary schools.

== History ==
The venue hosted the European Indoor Trials & UK Championships (athletics) between 14 – 15 February 2009. They also hosted the European Fencing championships in July 2011.

Since 2007, the venue has hosted qualifying matches for the World Snooker Championship, with the main stages held in the nearby Crucible Theatre. Qualifying matches, previously held in Prestatyn, typically took place between late February and early March but are now held in April. Since 2010 the EIS also hosted qualifying matches to snooker tournaments as well as all the now defunct PTC events.

The EIS-Sheffield was used by British Athletes to train for the 2012 Summer Olympics. In February 2015, it was announced that the English Institute of Sport, Sheffield would be incorporated into the Olympic Legacy Park on the site of the old Don Valley Stadium.

The venue was one of the three selected to host matches in the 2021 Wheelchair Rugby League World Cup.

== See also ==
- English Institute of Sport
