= 2026–27 British Championship Basketball season =

Sports competition season

2026–27 BCB season
- League: British Championship Basketball
- Sport: Basketball

2026–27

British Championship Basketball seasons
- ← 2025–26

The 2026–27 BCB season is the second season of British Championship Basketball, the second-tier professional basketball league in Great Britain.

== Teams ==
The teams for the 2026–27 season comprised all existing 14 member clubs from the 2025–26 season.

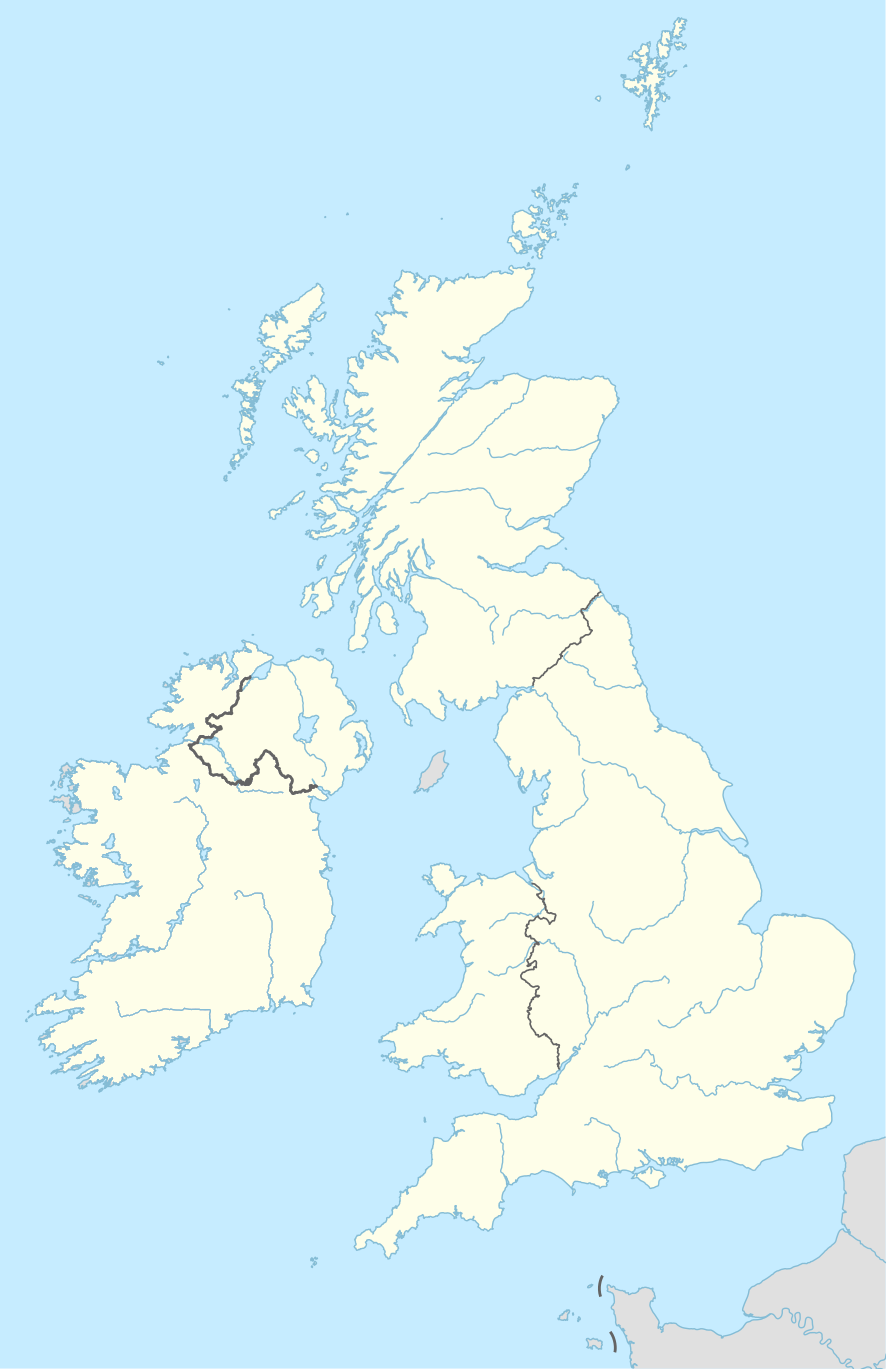
Locations of the 2026-27 BCB teams

League

Club	Location	Last season
(England) Birmingham Rockets	Birmingham	3rd
(England) Bristol Flyers II	Bristol	14th
(England) Bristol Hurricanes	Bristol	13th
(England) Derby Trailblazers	Derby	8th
(England) Essex Rebels	Colchester	12th
(England) Hemel Storm	Hemel Hempstead	9th
(England) London Cavaliers	London (Uxbridge)	6th
(England) Loughborough Riders	Loughborough	11th
(England) Milton Keynes Breakers	Milton Keynes	4th
(England) Newcastle Knights	Newcastle upon Tyne	2nd
(England) Nottingham Hoods	Nottingham	5th
(England) Reading Rockets	Reading	1st
(England) Worthing Thunder	Worthing	10th
(England) Yorkshire Dragons	Halifax	7th

BCB Trophy

Club	Location	Last season
(Wales) Cardiff Met Archers	Cardiff	D1 North, 9th
(Scotland) Falkirk Fury	Falkirk	SBC, 1st
(England) Gloucester City Kings	Gloucester	D2 SW, 1st
(England) Oaklands Wolves	St Albans	D2 Mid, 1st
(England) Plymouth Raiders	Plymouth	D2 SW, 4th
(England) Portsmouth Force	Portsmouth	D2 SW, 3rd

== BCB Trophy ==
=== Group 1 ===
Pos	Team	Pld	W	L	PF	PA	PD	Pts	Qualification	(England) NCL	(England) YRK	(England) NOT	(England) DER	(Scotland) FAL
1	(England) Newcastle Knights	4	3	1	360	326	+34	6	Quarter-finals	—	80–70	112–94		
2	(England) Yorkshire Dragons	4	3	1	338	301	+37	6	Quarter-finals		—		86–60	97–72
3	(England) Nottingham Hoods	4	2	2	360	358	+2	4			69–85	—	79–76	
4	(England) Derby Trailblazers	4	1	3	285	320	−35	2		71–87			—	78–68
5	(Scotland) Falkirk Fury	4	1	3	336	374	−38	2		91–81		85–118		—

Source: britishchampionship.basketball
Legend: Blue = home team win; Red = away team win.

=== Group 2 ===
Pos	Team	Pld	W	L	PF	PA	PD	Pts	Qualification	(England) HEM	(England) MKB	(England) BIR	(England) OAK	(England) LOU
1	(England) Hemel Storm	4	4	0	372	320	+52	8	Quarter-finals	—	99–93		90–74	
2	(England) Milton Keynes Breakers	4	3	1	367	354	+13	6	Quarter-finals		—	94–92		96–95
3	(England) Birmingham Rockets	4	1	3	340	350	−10	2		73–98		—		92–93
4	(England) Oaklands Wolves	4	1	3	300	336	−36	2			68–84	65–83	—	
5	(England) Loughborough Riders	4	1	3	347	366	−19	2		80–85			79–93	—

Source: britishchampionship.basketball
Legend: Blue = home team win; Red = away team win.

=== Group 3 ===
Pos	Team	Pld	W	L	PF	PA	PD	Pts	Qualification	(England) BRH	(England) GLO	(Wales) CAR	(England) BF2	(England) PLY
1	(England) Bristol Hurricanes	4	4	0	368	269	+99	8	Semifinals	—	87–65		104–72	
2	(England) Gloucester City Kings	4	3	1	349	309	+40	6	Semifinals		—	74–63		104–75
3	(Wales) Cardiff Met Archers	4	2	2	301	311	−10	4		74–90		—		82–67
4	(England) Bristol Flyers II	4	1	3	332	358	−26	2			84–106	80–82	—	
5	(England) Plymouth Raiders	4	0	4	266	369	−103	0		58–87			66–96	—

Source: britishchampionship.basketball
Legend: Blue = home team win; Red = away team win.

=== Group 4 ===
Pos	Team	Pld	W	L	PF	PA	PD	Pts	Qualification	(England) REA	(England) WOR	(England) ESX	(England) LON	(England) POR
1	(England) Reading Rockets	4	4	0	356	272	+84	8	Semifinals	—	101–78		80–54	
2	(England) Worthing Thunder	4	3	1	355	316	+39	6	Semifinals		—		87–77	104–65
3	(England) Essex Rebels	4	2	2	343	325	+18	4		76–88	73–86	—		
4	(England) London Cavaliers	4	1	3	296	325	−29	2				74–95	—	91–63
5	(England) Portsmouth Force	4	0	4	269	383	−114	0		64–87		77–99		—

Source: britishchampionship.basketball
Legend: Blue = home team win; Red = away team win.

== Regular season ==
Pos	Team	Pld	W	L	GF	GA	GD	Pts	Qualification or relegation
1	(England) Bristol Flyers II	0	0	0	0	0	0	0	Qualification to Playoffs
2	(England) Bristol Hurricanes	0	0	0	0	0	0	0	Qualification to Playoffs
3	(England) Birmingham Rockets	0	0	0	0	0	0	0	Qualification to Playoffs
4	(England) Derby Trailblazers	0	0	0	0	0	0	0	Qualification to Playoffs
5	(England) Essex Rebels	0	0	0	0	0	0	0	Qualification to Playoffs
6	(England) Hemel Storm	0	0	0	0	0	0	0	Qualification to Playoffs
7	(England) London Cavaliers	0	0	0	0	0	0	0	Qualification to Playoffs
8	(England) Loughborough Riders	0	0	0	0	0	0	0	Qualification to Playoffs
9	(England) Milton Keynes Breakers	0	0	0	0	0	0	0	
10	(England) Newcastle Knights	0	0	0	0	0	0	0	
11	(England) Nottingham Hoods	0	0	0	0	0	0	0	
12	(England) Reading Rockets	0	0	0	0	0	0	0	
13	(England) Worthing Thunder	0	0	0	0	0	0	0	
14	(England) Yorkshire Dragons	0	0	0	0	0	0	0	

Source: BCB Official Website
