= 2025–26 British Championship Basketball season =

Sports competition season

2025–26 BCB season
- League: British Championship Basketball
- Sport: Basketball

2025–26

British Championship Basketball seasons
- 2026–27 →

The 2025–26 BCB season is the inaugural season of British Championship Basketball, a new second-tier professional British basketball league.

== Teams ==
The teams for the inaugural season comprised all 13 NBL Division One men’s clubs from the previous season, as well as Bristol Flyers II, who would have been promoted from NBL Division Two. Two Scottish teams were also proposed to join the BCB Trophy competition in the inaugural season in 2025-26, with intentions to join the league in full in 2026-27.

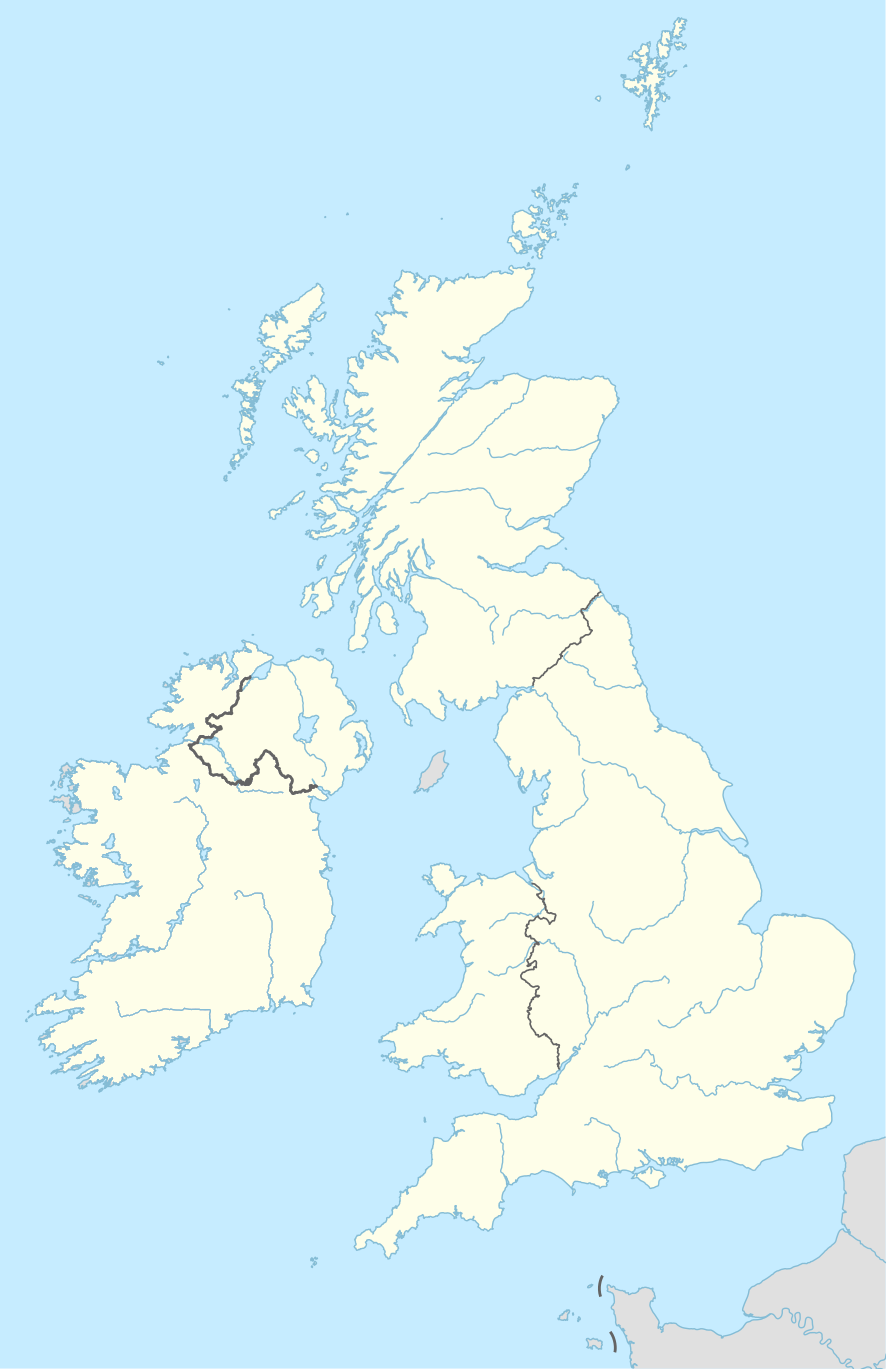
Locations of the 2025-26 BCB teams

League

Club	Location	Last season
(England) Birmingham Rockets	Birmingham	D1, 9th
(England) Bristol Flyers II	Bristol	D2 North, 1st
(England) Bristol Hurricanes	Bristol	D1, 8th
(England) Derby Trailblazers	Derby	D1, 2nd
(England) Essex Rebels	Colchester	D1, 6th
(England) Hemel Storm	Hemel Hempstead	D1, 1st
(England) London Cavaliers	London (Uxbridge)	D1, 7th
(England) Loughborough Riders	Loughborough	D1, 5th
(England) Milton Keynes Breakers	Milton Keynes	D1, 4th
(England) Newcastle Knights	Newcastle upon Tyne	D1, 11th
(England) Nottingham Hoods	Nottingham	D1, 10th
(England) Reading Rockets	Reading	D1, 3rd
(England) Worthing Thunder	Worthing	D1, 13th
(England) Yorkshire Dragons	Halifax	D1, 12th

BCB Trophy

Club	Location	Last season
(Scotland) Boroughmuir Blaze	Edinburgh	SBC, 2nd
(Scotland) Falkirk Fury	Grangemouth	SBC, 1st

== BCB Trophy ==
=== Group 1 ===
Pos	Team	Pld	W	L	PF	PA	PD	Pts	Qualification	(England) YRK	(Scotland) FAL	(England) NCL	(Scotland) BOR
1	(England) Yorkshire Dragons	3	3	0	340	280	+60	6	Quarter-finals	—	112–70		106–90
2	(Scotland) Falkirk Fury	3	2	1	267	296	−29	4	Quarter-finals		—	86–80	111–104
3	(England) Newcastle Knights	3	1	2	305	285	+20	2		120–122		—	
4	(Scotland) Boroughmuir Blaze	3	0	3	271	322	−51	0				77–105	—

Source: britishchampionship.basketball
Legend: Blue = home team win; Red = away team win.

=== Group 2 ===
Pos	Team	Pld	W	L	PF	PA	PD	Pts	Qualification	(England) NOT	(England) LOU	(England) DER	(England) BF2
1	(England) Nottingham Hoods	3	3	0	282	219	+63	6	Quarter-finals	—		87–73	102–69
2	(England) Loughborough Riders	3	2	1	267	238	+29	4	Quarter-finals	77–93	—		
3	(England) Derby Trailblazers	3	1	2	284	248	+36	2			88–96	—	
4	(England) Bristol Flyers II	3	0	3	191	319	−128	0			57–94	65–123	—

Source: britishchampionship.basketball
Legend: Blue = home team win; Red = away team win.

=== Group 3 ===
Pos	Team	Pld	W	L	PF	PA	PD	Pts	Qualification	(England) BIR	(England) MKB	(England) HEM	(England) BRH
1	(England) Birmingham Rockets	3	3	0	246	222	+24	6	Semifinals	—		84–83	
2	(England) Milton Keynes Breakers	3	1	2	251	234	+17	2	Semifinals	77–82	—		92–63
3	(England) Hemel Storm	3	1	2	259	255	+4	2			89–82	—	87–89
4	(England) Bristol Hurricanes	3	1	2	214	259	−45	2		62–80			—

Source: britishchampionship.basketball
Legend: Blue = home team win; Red = away team win.

=== Group 4 ===
Pos	Team	Pld	W	L	PF	PA	PD	Pts	Qualification	(England) REA	(England) WOR	(England) LON	(England) ESX
1	(England) Reading Rockets	3	3	0	282	224	+58	6	Semifinals	—	103–87	89–77	
2	(England) Worthing Thunder	3	2	1	291	276	+15	4	Semifinals		—	97–88	107–85
3	(England) London Cavaliers	3	1	2	254	270	−16	2				—	89–84
4	(England) Essex Rebels	3	0	3	229	286	−57	0		60–90			—

Source: britishchampionship.basketball
Legend: Blue = home team win; Red = away team win.

=== Quarter-finals ===
04 October 2025	(England) Yorkshire Dragons	112–108	(England) Worthing Thunder	Inspire Centre, Halifax

04 October 2025	(England) Birmingham Rockets	88–71	(England) Loughborough Riders	Nechells WC, Birmingham

04 October 2025	(England) Nottingham Hoods	66–79	(Scotland) Falkirk Fury	Harvey Hadden SV, Nottingham

04 October 2025	(England) Reading Rockets	79–90	(England) Milton Keynes Breakers	Loddon Valley LC, Reading

=== Semi-finals ===
24 October 2025	(Scotland) Falkirk Fury	77–93	(England) Yorkshire Dragons	Grangemouth SC, Grangemouth

26 October 2025	(England) Birmingham Rockets	79–71	(England) Milton Keynes Breakers	Nechells WC, Birmingham

=== Final ===
28 March 2026	(England) Yorkshire Dragons	66–85	(England) Birmingham Rockets	Harvey Hadden SV, Nottingham
	Scoring by quarter: 13-23, 14-20, 14-17, 25-25
		Report

== Regular season ==
Pos	Team	Pld	W	L	GF	GA	GD	Pts	Qualification or relegation
1	(England) Reading Rockets (C)	26	22	4	2307	1972	+335	44	Qualification to Playoffs
2	(England) Newcastle Knights	26	19	7	2566	2442	+124	38	Qualification to Playoffs
3	(England) Birmingham Rockets	26	18	8	2370	2143	+227	36	Qualification to Playoffs
4	(England) Milton Keynes Breakers	26	17	9	2305	2058	+247	34	Qualification to Playoffs
5	(England) Nottingham Hoods	26	16	10	2294	2157	+137	32	Qualification to Playoffs
6	(England) London Cavaliers	26	15	11	2225	2136	+89	30	Qualification to Playoffs
7	(England) Yorkshire Dragons	26	15	11	2282	2218	+64	30	Qualification to Playoffs
8	(England) Derby Trailblazers	26	14	12	2247	2211	+36	28	Qualification to Playoffs
9	(England) Hemel Storm	26	10	16	2297	2294	+3	20	
10	(England) Worthing Thunder	26	10	16	2208	2306	−98	20	
11	(England) Loughborough Riders	26	9	17	2145	2226	−81	18	
12	(England) Essex Rebels	26	9	17	2181	2288	−107	18	
13	(England) Bristol Hurricanes	26	6	20	1910	2136	−226	12	
14	(England) Bristol Flyers II	26	2	24	1737	2487	−750	4	

Source: BCB Official Website
(C) Champions

== Playoffs ==
=== Quarter-finals ===
18 April 2026	(England) Newcastle Knights	102–95	(England) Yorkshire Dragons	Newcastle University, Newcastle

18 April 2026	(England) Milton Keynes Breakers	102–95	(England) Nottingham Hoods	Bletchley LC, Milton Keynes

18 April 2026	(England) Birmingham Rockets	74–62	(England) London Cavaliers	Nechells WC, Birmingham

19 April 2026	(England) Reading Rockets	77–65	(England) Derby Trailblazers	Loddon Valley LC, Reading

=== Semi-finals ===
25 April 2026	(England) Newcastle Knights	101–95	(England) Birmingham Rockets	Newcastle University, Newcastle

26 April 2026	(England) Reading Rockets	85–64	(England) Milton Keynes Breakers	Loddon Valley LC, Reading

=== Final ===
3 May 2026	(England) Reading Rockets	83–93	(England) Newcastle Knights	Leeds Beckett University, Leeds
	Scoring by quarter: 21-21, 24-23, 23-24, 25-35
		Report
