= 2021–22 National Basketball League (England) season =

2021–22 NBL season
- League: NBL England
- Sport: Basketball
- Teams: 93

2021–22

English Basketball League seasons
- ← 2020–21 2022–23 →

The 2021–22 NBL season was the 50th season of the National Basketball League (England). This season marks the return of Division 2 and Division 3, after a one-year hiatus due to the COVID-19 pandemic. The league structure was announced in June 2021.

== NBL Division 1 ==
=== Team changes ===
Team changes

- BA London Lions to London Lions II

=== Teams ===
Location of teams in 2021–22 NBL Division 1

Club	Location	Last season
Bradford Dragons	Bradford	11th
Derby Trailblazers	Derby	4th
Essex Rebels	Colchester	6th
Hemel Storm	Hemel Hempstead	3rd
Leicester Warriors	Leicester	12th
Loughborough Riders	Loughborough	8th
London Lions II	London (Barking)	10th
Nottingham Hoods	Nottingham	14th
Oaklands Wolves	St Albans	13th
Reading Rockets	Reading	9th
Solent Kestrels	Southampton	1st
Team Newcastle	Newcastle upon Tyne	5th
Thames Valley Cavaliers	London (Uxbridge)	2nd
Worthing Thunder	Worthing	7th

=== Regular season ===
Pos	Team	Pld	W	L	GF	GA	GD	Pts	Qualification or relegation
1	Solent Kestrels (C)	26	24	2	2541	1797	+744	48	Qualification to Playoffs
2	Thames Valley Cavaliers	26	20	6	2398	2015	+383	40	Qualification to Playoffs
3	Derby Trailblazers	26	19	7	2427	2122	+305	38	Qualification to Playoffs
4	Nottingham Hoods	26	18	8	2236	2062	+174	36	Qualification to Playoffs
5	Worthing Thunder	26	17	9	2293	2170	+123	34	Qualification to Playoffs
6	Hemel Storm	26	16	10	2422	2228	+194	32	Qualification to Playoffs
7	Team Newcastle	26	15	11	2362	2352	+10	30	Qualification to Playoffs
8	Reading Rockets	26	15	11	2171	1975	+196	28	Qualification to Playoffs
9	Bradford Dragons	26	10	16	2078	2247	−169	20	
10	London Lions II	26	9	17	2118	2414	−296	18	
11	Loughborough Riders	26	8	18	2060	2331	−271	16	
12	Essex Rebels	26	4	22	2030	2417	−387	8	
13	Leicester Warriors (R)	26	4	22	1957	2316	−359	8	Relegation to Division 2
14	Oaklands Wolves (R)	26	3	23	1938	2585	−647	6	Relegation to Division 2

Source: Basketball England Official Website
(C) Champions; (R) Relegated

=== Playoffs ===
Quarter-finals

2 Apr 2022

Solent Kestrels	100–72	Reading Rockets

2 Apr 2022

Thames Valley Cavaliers	92–80	Team Newcastle

2 Apr 2022

Derby Trailblazers	90–91 (OT)	Hemel Storm

2 Apr 2022

Nottingham Hoods	88–79	Worthing Thunder

Semi-finals

9 Apr 2022

Solent Kestrels	104–80	Nottingham Hoods

9 Apr 2022

Thames Valley Cavaliers	78–91	Hemel Storm

Final

24 Apr 2022

Report

Solent Kestrels	71–69	Hemel Storm

National Basketball Centre, Manchester

== NBL Division 2 ==
=== Regular season ===
North
Pos	Team	Pld	W	L	GF	GA	GD	Pts
1	Manchester Magic (P)	22	19	3	1728	1380	+348	38
2	Northamptonshire Titans	22	15	7	1934	1853	+81	30
3	Doncaster Eagles	22	15	7	1837	1661	+176	30
4	Derbyshire Arrows	22	12	10	1673	1654	+19	24
5	Myerscough College	22	12	10	1716	1552	+164	24
6	Charnwood Riders	22	9	13	1677	1673	+4	18
7	City of Birmingham Rockets	22	9	13	1562	1649	−87	18
8	Bristol Hurricanes	22	9	13	1674	1784	−110	18
9	Nottingham Trent University	22	9	13	1680	1857	−177	18
10	Bristol Flyers II	22	8	14	1582	1672	−90	16
11	Team Birmingham Elite (R)	22	10	12	1487	1584	−97	14
12	University of Chester (R)	22	5	17	1441	1672	−231	10

(P) Promoted; (R) Relegated

South
Pos	Team	Pld	W	L	GF	GA	GD	Pts
1	Westminster Warriors (P)	22	22	0	1984	1533	+451	44
2	Sussex Bears	22	16	6	1769	1606	+163	32
3	Solent Kestrels II	22	15	7	1870	1609	+261	30
4	Greenwich Titans	22	15	7	1775	1718	+57	30
5	East London All-Stars	22	13	9	1699	1581	+118	26
6	Richmond Knights	22	10	12	1696	1673	+23	20
7	Baltic Stars Medelynas	22	8	14	1629	1726	−97	16
8	Oxford Hoops	22	8	14	1684	1858	−174	16
9	Ipswich	22	8	14	1648	1843	−195	16
10	London Greenhouse Pioneers	22	6	16	1711	1874	−163	12
11	Cardiff Met Archers (R)	22	6	16	1684	1831	−147	12
12	London Westside (R)	22	5	17	1615	1912	−297	10

(P) Promoted; (R) Relegated

=== Playoffs ===
Quarter-finals

2 Apr 2022

Sussex Bears	58–71	Doncaster Eagles

2 Apr 2022

Manchester Magic	83–72	Greenwich Titans

3 Apr 2022

Westminster Warriors	94–64	Derbyshire Arrows

3 Apr 2022

Northamptonshire Titans	79–94	Solent Kestrels II

Semi-finals

9 Apr 2022

Manchester Magic	78–72	Doncaster Eagles

9 Apr 2022

Westminster Warriors	97–107	Solent Kestrels II

Final

23 Apr 2022

Report

Manchester Magic	88–87 (OT)	Solent Kestrels II

National Basketball Centre, Manchester

== NBL Division 3 ==
=== Regular season ===
North
Pos	Team	Pld	W	L	Pts
1	Teesside Lions	15	13	2	26
2	Tees Valley Mohawks	15	12	3	24
3	Sheffield Elite	15	8	7	16
4	Calderdale Explorers	15	8	7	16
5	Newcastle Eagles U23	15	3	12	6
6	Sheffield Elite II	15	0	15	0

North West
Pos	Team	Pld	W	L	Pts
1	St Helens Saints (P)	20	20	0	40
2	Manchester Swarm	20	15	5	30
3	Liverpool	20	14	6	28
4	Myerscough College II	20	13	7	26
5	Manchester Kings	20	11	9	22
6	Preston	20	11	9	22
7	Stockport Falcons	20	9	11	18
8	Tameside	20	8	12	16
9	Barrow Thorns	20	4	16	8
10	Cheshire Wire	20	4	16	8
11	Manchester Giants U23	20	1	19	2

(P) Promoted

Midlands
Pos	Team	Pld	W	L	Pts
1	Worcester Wolves (P)	16	15	1	30
2	West Bromwich	16	11	5	22
3	Stoke-on-Trent Knights	16	11	5	22
4	Derby Trailblazers II	16	8	8	16
5	Coventry Flames	15	8	7	16
6	Stourport Spartans	16	5	11	10
7	Nottingham Hoods II	15	5	10	10
8	Warwickshire Hawks	16	3	13	6
9	Birmingham Mets	16	3	13	6

(P) Promoted

East
Pos	Team	Pld	W	L	Pts
1	Anglia Ruskin University	14	12	2	24
2	Essex Rebels II	14	12	2	24
3	Univ. of Hertfordshire Storm	14	10	4	20
4	UEA Panthers	14	6	8	12
5	Bury St. Edmunds Bulldogs	14	6	8	12
6	Northamptonshire Titans II	14	5	9	10
7	Canterbury Crusaders	14	3	11	6
8	West Suffolk Wolves	14	2	12	4

London
Pos	Team	Pld	W	L	Pts
1	London Thunder	12	9	3	18
2	UEL Lions	12	9	3	18
3	BA London Lions	12	7	5	14
4	CoLA Southwark Pride	12	5	7	10
5	London Topcats Legends	12	5	7	10
6	Brent Bulls	12	4	8	8
7	London Future Generations	12	2	10	4

South
Pos	Team	Pld	W	L	Pts
1	London Elite (P)	9	9	0	18
2	Solent Kestrels III	10	6	4	12
3	London United	10	6	4	12
4	Crawley Storm	10	5	5	10
5	Surrey Rams	10	2	8	4
6	London Warriors	9	1	8	2

(P) Promoted

South West
Pos	Team	Pld	W	L	Pts
1	Bristol United (P)	12	11	1	22
2	Bognor GSD	12	8	4	16
3	Team Swindon	12	8	4	16
4	Cardiff City	12	7	5	14
5	Plymouth Marjon University	12	5	7	10
6	Cardiff Met Archers II	12	2	10	4
7	Dorset Storm	12	1	11	2

(P) Promoted

=== Playoffs ===
First round

26 Mar 2022

London Elite	86–75	University of Hertfordshire Storm

26 Mar 2022

Worcester Wolves	72–63	Solent Kestrels III

26 Mar 2022

Bristol United	94–49	Bognor GSD

26 Mar 2022

Anglia Ruskin University	67–74	Manchester Swarm

26 Mar 2022

Essex Rebels II	107–110	Tees Valley Mohawks

27 Mar 2022

Teesside Lions	75–52	West Bromwich

27 Mar 2022

London Thunder	68–62	UEL Lions

27 Mar 2022

St Helens Saints	79–68	Liverpool

Quarter-finals

3 Apr 2022

St Helens Saints	81–51	Tees Valley Mohawks

2 Apr 2022

London Elite	80–83	London Thunder

3 Apr 2022

Worcester Wolves	70–55	Manchester Swarm

2 Apr 2022

Bristol United	69–90	Teesside Lions

Semi-finals

10 Apr 2022

St Helens Saints	78–80	Teesside Lions

10 Apr 2022

Worcester Wolves	59–56	London Thunder

Final

23 Apr 2022

Report

Teesside Lions	65–56	Worcester Wolves

National Basketball Centre, Manchester

== National Cup ==
=== First round ===
London Thunder	114–48	London Topcats Legends

Ipswich	99–47	Bury St Edmunds Bulldogs

London Elite	82–71	CoLA Southwark Pride

Liverpool	90–66	Manchester Giants U23

Calderdale Explorers	81–70	Sheffield Elite

Warwickshire Warriors	50–75	Birmingham Mets

West Bromwich	94–87	Warwickshire Hawks

Worcester Wolves	67–68	City of Birmingham Rockets

Swindon Shock	55–102	Team Swindon

Bristol United	94–74	Cardiff City

=== Second round ===
Teesside Lions	76–67	Derbyshire Arrows

Manchester Swarm	70–80	Doncaster Eagles

Calderdale Explorers	59–62	University of Chester

City of Birmingham Rockets	65–71	Team Birmingham Elite

Northamptonshire Titans	81–55	Ipswich

Richmond Knights	93–94	London Greenhouse Pioneers

London United	70–73	Sussex Bears

East London All-Stars	73–76	Brent Bulls

London Elite	82–78	Greenwich Titans

Plymouth Marjon University	86–99	Team Swindon

Oxford Hoops	57–78	Bristol Hurricanes

Bristol Flyers II	67–81	Bristol United

Westminster Warriors	55–59	London Thunder

Manchester Magic	88–73	Liverpool

=== Third round ===
Team Newcastle	79–64	Teesside Lions

Doncaster Eagles	87–76	Loughborough Riders

Bradford Dragons	91–80	Manchester Magic

University of Chester	v–v	Leicester Warriors

West Bromwich	69–96	Nottingham Hoods

Hemel Storm	87–73	Team Birmingham Elite

Northamptonshire Titans	83–69	London Greenhouse Pioneers

Oaklands Wolves	69–65	London Thunder

Sussex Bears	71–94	London Lions II

London Westside	56–84	London Elite

Essex Rebels	90–59	Cardiff Met Archers

Worthing Thunder	94–74	Bristol Hurricanes

Brent Bulls	65–126	Thames Valley Cavaliers

Solent Kestrels	108–34	Team Swindon

Myerscough College	77–93	Derby Trailblazers

Reading Rockets	107–81	Bristol United

=== Fourth round ===
Oaklands Wolves	vs.	London Lions II

Team Newcastle	95–75	Doncaster Eagles

Bradford Dragons	77–91	Derby Trailblazers

Hemel Storm	106–69	Northamptonshire Titans

Essex Rebels	76–110	Solent Kestrels

Worthing Thunder	97–90	Reading Rockets.

Thames Valley Cavaliers	104–61	London Elite

=== Quarter-finals ===
5 Dec 2021

Team Newcastle	108–106	Worthing Thunder

5 Dec 2021

Nottingham Hoods	69–80	Thames Valley Cavaliers

5 Dec 2021

Derby Trailblazers	56–80	Solent Kestrels

5 Dec 2021

Hemel Storm	84–85	London Lions II

=== Semi-finals ===
9 Jan 2022

Team Newcastle	90–81	Thames Valley Cavaliers

9 Jan 2022

Solent Kestrels	102–72	London Lions II

=== Final ===
23 Jan 2022
15:30

Team Newcastle	66–109	Solent Kestrels
Scoring by quarter: 15–29, 24–29, 19–30, 8–21
Pts: R Blain 24; Rebs: R Blain, J Cork 7 Asts: T Yabantu 4		Pts: O Jackman 22; Rebs: O Jackman, K Archer 8 Asts: C Gentry 5

National Basketball Centre, Manchester

== L Lynch Trophy ==
The 2021–22 L Lynch Trophy was the second edition of the competition. The same 16 teams as in 2020–21, the 14 NBL Division 1 sides and the Myerscough and Charnwood academy sides, were split into four regional groups. The top 2 sides from each group would advance to the quarter-finals, therein playing a knockout format to determine the overall winners.

=== Group stage ===
Group 1

Pos	Team	Pld	W	L	PF	PA	PD	Pts	Qualification
1	Team Newcastle	2	2	0	181	156	+25	4	Qualification to quarter finals
2	Derby Trailblazers	2	2	0	188	122	+66	4	Qualification to quarter finals
3	Bradford Dragons	3	1	2	217	253	−36	2	
4	Myerscough College	3	0	3	207	262	−55	0	

Updated to match(es) played on unknown. Source: Basketball England

Bradford Dragons	89–91	Team Newcastle

Myerscough College	68–78	Bradford Dragons

Team Newcastle	vs.	Derby Trailblazers

Derby Trailblazers	94–50	Bradford Dragons

Team Newcastle	90–67	Myerscough College

Derby Trailblazers	94–72	Myerscough College

Group 2

Pos	Team	Pld	W	L	PF	PA	PD	Pts	Qualification
1	Reading Rockets	3	2	1	270	215	+55	4	Qualification to quarter finals
2	Thames Valley Cavaliers	3	2	1	272	222	+50	4	Qualification to quarter finals
3	Hemel Storm	3	2	1	278	228	+50	4	
4	Oaklands Wolves	3	0	3	170	325	−155	0	

Updated to match(es) played on unknown. Source: Basketball England

Reading Rockets	78–81	Hemel Storm

Thames Valley Cavaliers	103–55	Oaklands Wolves

Reading Rockets	93–87	Thames Valley Cavaliers

Hemel Storm	123–68	Oaklands Wolves

Hemel Storm	74–82	Thames Valley Cavaliers

Oaklands Wolves	47–99	Reading Rockets

Group 3

Pos	Team	Pld	W	L	PF	PA	PD	Pts	Qualification
1	Nottingham Hoods	3	3	0	313	183	+130	6	Qualification to quarter finals
2	Loughborough Riders	3	2	1	218	230	−12	4	Qualification to quarter finals
3	Leicester Warriors	3	1	2	218	260	−42	2	
4	Charnwood College	3	0	3	193	269	−76	0	

Updated to match(es) played on unknown. Source: Basketball England

Leicester Warriors	67–113	Nottingham Hoods

Loughborough Riders	86–62	Charnwood College

Loughborough Riders	77–73	Leicester Warriors

Charnwood College	70–78	Leicester Warriors

Nottingham Hoods	95–55	Loughborough Riders

Nottingham Hoods	105–61	Charnwood College

Group 4

Pos	Team	Pld	W	L	PF	PA	PD	Pts	Qualification
1	Solent Kestrels	3	3	0	304	192	+112	6	Qualification to quarter finals
2	Worthing Thunder	3	2	1	278	245	+33	4	Qualification to quarter finals
3	Essex Rebels	3	1	2	236	307	−71	2	
4	London Lions II	3	0	3	210	284	−74	0	

Updated to match(es) played on unknown. Source: Basketball England

Solent Kestrels	103–53	London Lions II

Essex Rebels	84–110	Worthing Thunder

Solent Kestrels	110–61	Essex Rebels

Worthing Thunder	78–91	Solent Kestrels

Essex Rebels	91–87	London Lions II

London Lions II	70–90	Worthing Thunder

=== Quarter-finals ===
Solent Kestrels	98–88	Thames Valley Cavaliers

Reading Rockets	90–86	Loughborough Riders

Nottingham Hoods	72–94	Derby Trailblazers

Team Newcastle	99–81	Worthing Thunder

=== Semi-finals ===
11 Dec 2021

Team Newcastle	92–88	Reading Rockets

12 Dec 2021

Derby Trailblazers	92–77	Solent Kestrels

=== Final ===
2 Jan 2022
12:00

Team Newcastle	71–86	Derby Trailblazers
Scoring by quarter: 16–24, 21–22, 21–21, 13–19
Pts: B Federici 24; Rebs: R Blain 11; Asts: D Moya 6		Pts: M Smith 30; Rebs: M Smith 18; Asts: R Bruggeman 7

Ponds Forge, Sheffield
