= Solent Kestrels =

- League: Men NBL Division 1 South Women NBL Division 2
- Established: 1998; 28 years ago
- History: Solent Kestrels; 1998-present
- Arena: Solent Sports Complex
- Capacity: 500
- Location: Southampton, Hampshire
- Team colours: Red Blue Black White
- Main sponsor: Kestrels Guards
- Head coach: Matthew Guymon
- Website: Official website

The Solent Kestrels are an English professional basketball club based in the city of Southampton, Hampshire. Founded in 1998, the Kestrels play their home games at the Solent Sports Complex at Solent University.

== History ==
=== Junior roots ===
The club was founded in 1998 by Jimmie and Bev Guymon, who wanted somewhere for their son and other youngsters in the area to play competitive basketball. Originally set up to offer junior basketball to boys teams from under-13's to under-18's, the club offers junior basketball to boys and girls from under-10 up to under-18 National League level. The girls program was introduced in 2001, an initiative of Ollie Jerram and Bev Guymon, giving Ollie's daughter the opportunity to play with other girls, as mixed basketball was not allowed after the age of 15. In their first season, the team won the U16 National title.

=== Elite academy ===
The club is partnered with Itchen College, with whom they offer elite level, under-19 basketball development to some of the county's top male and female players.

=== Senior teams ===
The Kestrels offers senior basketball with two teams playing at National League level.

The men's senior team, established in 2012, are previous National Basketball League League and Playoffs champions, the second tier of British men's basketball. In 2020, the Kestrels became the first-ever NBL team to reach the semi-finals of a top-tier British Basketball League competition, the BBL Trophy, and eventually finished as runners-up, losing to the Newcastle Eagles 96-94 after overtime in the final.

== Men's team ==
=== Honours ===
National Cup Champions (2): 2019-20 , 2021-22
National League Division 1 League Champions (4): 2018-19, 2019-20, 2020-21, 2021-22
National League Division 1 Playoffs Champions (3): 2018-19, 2020-21, 2021-22
National Trophy Champions (1): 2017-18
National League Division 2 League Champions (1): 2015-16
National League Division 3 South League Champions (1): 2014-15
L Lynch Trophy Champions (1): 2020-21

=== Players ===
Notable former players

Note: Flags indicate national team eligibility at FIBA-sanctioned events. Players may hold other non-FIBA nationalities not displayed.

Criteria

To appear in this section a player must have either:

- Set a club record or won an individual award while at the club
- Played at least one official international match for their national team at any time
- Played at least one official NBA match at any time.

- (United Kingdom) Joel Freeland
- (Poland) Jeremy Sochan

=== Season-by-season records ===
Season	Division	Tier	League						Playoffs	National Cup
Season	Division	Tier	Finish	Played	Wins	Losses	Points	Win %	Playoffs	National Cup
Solent Kestrels
2012-13	D3 Sou	4	7th	18	7	11	14	0.389	Did not qualify	1st round
2013-14	D3 Sou	4	3rd	20	17	3	26	0.650	Semi-finals	1st round
2014-15	D3 Sou	4	1st	18	15	3	30	0.833	Runners-Up	1st round
2015-16	D2	3	1st	22	18	4	36	0.818	Runners-Up	1st round
2016-17	D1	2	6th	26	15	11	30	0.577	Semi-finals	Runners-Up
2017-18	D1	2	2nd	24	20	4	40	0.833	Quarter-finals	Semi-finals
2018-19	D1	2	1st	26	22	4	44	0.846	Winners, beating Worthing	Runners-Up
2019-20	D1	2	1st	23	22	1	47	0.957	No playoffs	Winners, beating Reading
2020-21	D1	2	1st	19	17	2	34	0.895	Winners, beating Hemel	No competition
2021-22	D1	2	1st	26	24	2	48	0.923	Winners, beating Hemel	Winners, beating Newcastle
2022-23	D1	2	8th	26	12	14	24	0.462	Quarter-finals	5th round
2023-24	D2 Sou	3	2nd	22	21	1	42	0.955		

=== Record in BBL competitions ===
Season	Competition	Round	Opponent	Home	Away
2018–19	BBL Trophy	R1	Cheshire Phoenix		L 86-75
2019–20	BBL Trophy	R1	London Lions		W 82-92
2019–20	BBL Trophy	QF	Worthing Thunder		W 81-94
2019–20	BBL Trophy	SF	Bristol Flyers	W 103-67	L 92-73
2019–20	BBL Trophy	F	Newcastle Eagles		L 96-94 (OT)
2020–21	BBL Trophy	R1	Derby Trailblazers		W 73-101
2020–21	BBL Trophy	QF	Surrey Scorchers		L 82-73
2021–22	BBL Trophy	R1	Glasgow Rocks		L 82-91

== Women's team ==
Honours

National League Division 1 League Champions (1): 2016-17
National League Division 1 League Champions (1): 2022-23

== See also ==
- Official website
