= Corey Johnson (basketball) =

Canadian basketball player

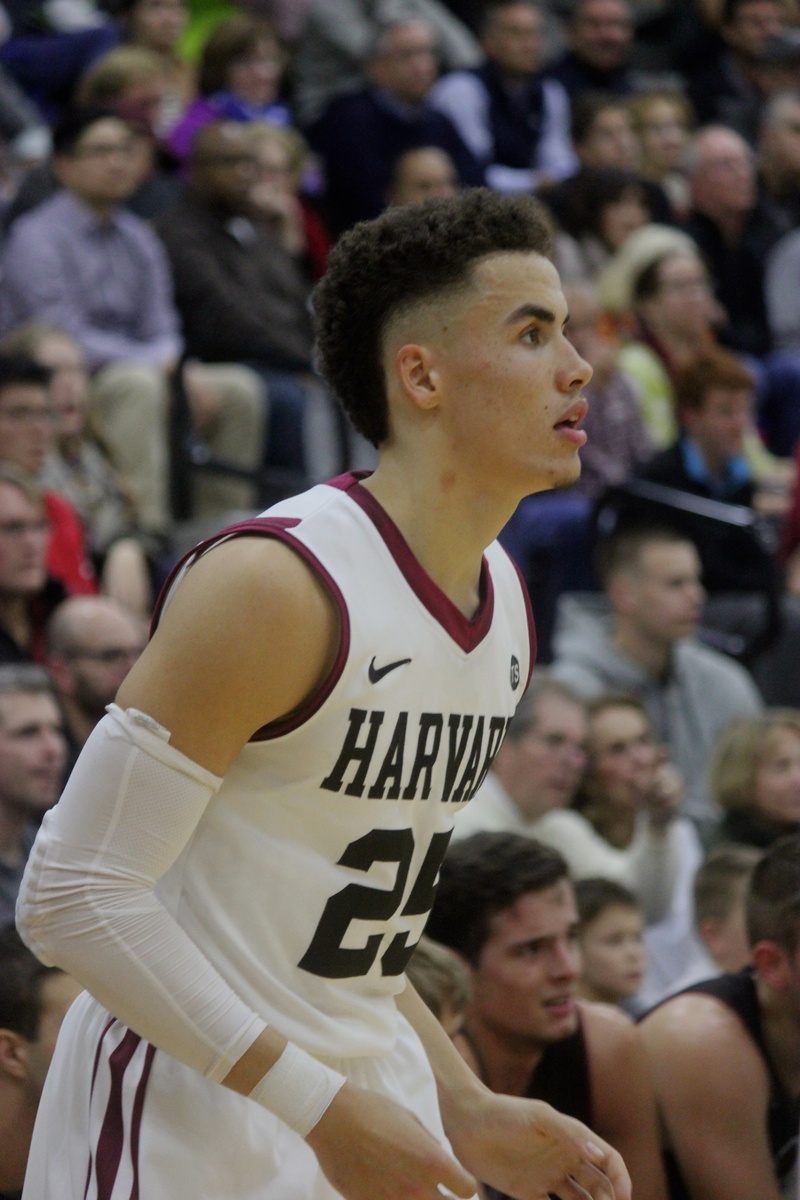
- Johnson playing for Harvard

No. 6 – Team Newcastle Knights
- Position: Shooting guard
- League: NBL

Personal information
- Born: April 19, 1996 (age 30) Ottawa, Ontario
- Listed height: 6 ft 5 in (1.96 m)
- Listed weight: 200 lb (91 kg)

Career information
- High school: Vermont Academy (Saxtons River, Vermont)
- College: Harvard (2015–2019)
- NBA draft: 2019: undrafted
- Playing career: 2019–present

Career history
- 2019: Zornotza ST
- 2020: Leicester Riders
- 2020: Guelph Nighthawks
- 2020–2021: Leicester Riders
- 2021–22: Newcastle Eagles
- 2022: Ottawa BlackJacks
- 2023-24: Derby Trailblazers
- 2024-25: Newcastle Knights
- 2025-Present: Yorkshire Dragons
Medals
Men's basketball
Representing Canada
FIBA Americas U18 Championship
Silver medal – second place	2014 United States	Team

Corey Johnson (born April 19, 1996) is a Canadian professional basketball player for the Ottawa BlackJacks of the Canadian Elite Basketball League. He played college basketball for Harvard University.

== College career ==
Johnson began his college career at Harvard. After entering the university, Johnson spent the 2015–16 basketball season competing for the Crimson. During his freshman year, he helped lead the Crimson to a 14–16 record, 6–8 in Ivy League play to finish in fourth place. Johnson averaged 9.8 points with a .398 three-point field goal percentage; and, he also set a Harvard freshman record with 74 3-pointers in 2015-16, the third-most in program history.

As a sophomore, Johnson averaged 8.2 points and 2.8 rebounds per game. In the Ivy League season finale on March 3, 2018, Johnson led Harvard with 17 points in a 93-74 win over Columbia to give the Crimson the No. 1 seed in the Ivy League tournament. He shot 5 of 8 from behind the 3-point arc. Johnson averaged 6.5 points and 2.9 rebounds per game as a junior. As a senior, he averaged 3.4 points and 1.4 rebounds per game.

== Professional career ==
On July 24, 2019, Johnson signed with Zornotza ST of the Spanish LEB Plata. He averaged 10.6 points, 3.5 rebounds and 1.9 assists per game in 15 games. Johnson left the team on January 1, 2020. He signed with Leicester Riders of the British Basketball League in late January. In the BBL Championship versus the Surrey Scorchers, he posted 32 points, 5 rebounds, and 4 assists. Johnson averaged 12.4 points, 3.9 rebounds, and 2.1 assists per game. On June 22, 2020, Johnson signed with the Guelph Nighthawks of the Canadian Elite Basketball League (CEBL). On July 28, he rejoined the Leicester Riders. During the 2020-21 season, Johnson averaged 10.5 points, 3.7 rebounds and 2 assists per game to help Leicester win the BBL Championship title. On July 19, 2021, he signed with Newcastle Eagles in the BBL.

== International career ==
While still in high school, in 2014 Johnson tried out for and was selected to the U-18 Canadian National Basketball team. The team won the silver medal at the U-18 FIBA Americas for Men in Colorado Springs. In 2015, Johnson was selected to the U-19 Canadian National Basketball team. The team went 6-1 and finished 5th at the FIBA U-19 World Championship. This was the national team's highest finish at the event. Johnson averaged 12.1 points, 3.4 rebounds and 0.7 assists for Canada FIBA U-19 World Championship.
