= 2020–21 National Basketball League (England) season =

2020–21 NBL season
- League: NBL England
- Sport: Basketball
- Teams: 14

2020–21

English Basketball League seasons
- ← 2019–20 2021–22 →

The 2020–21 NBL season was the 49th edition of the English Men's National Basketball League.

It was announced that there would be no promotion or relegation following the 2020–21 season, due to the ongoing impact of the COVID-19 pandemic. The NBL2 and NBL3 seasons were indefinitely suspended, later cancelled, and the NBL1 season structure was revised into regionalised schedules, due to the ongoing situation presented by the pandemic.

== NBL Division 1 ==
=== Team changes ===
Promoted from NBL Division 2

- Team Newcastle
- Essex Rebels

Relegated to NBL Division 2

- Liverpool
- Westminster Warriors

Team changes

- Essex & Herts Leopards to Oaklands Wolves
- Barking Abbey to BA London Lions

=== Teams ===
Location of teams in 2020–21 NBL Division 1

Club	Location	Last season
BA London Lions	London (Barking)	12th
Bradford Dragons	Bradford	8th
Derby Trailblazers	Derby	3rd
Essex Rebels	Colchester	D2 Sou, 1st (promoted)
Hemel Storm	Hemel Hempstead	4th
Leicester Warriors	Leicester	9th
Loughborough Riders	Loughborough	6th
Nottingham Hoods	Nottingham	10th
Oaklands Wolves	St Albans	11th
Reading Rockets	Reading	7th
Solent Kestrels	Southampton	1st
Team Newcastle	Newcastle upon Tyne	D2 Nor, 1st (promoted)
Thames Valley Cavaliers	London (Uxbridge)	2nd
Worthing Thunder	Worthing	5th

=== Regular season ===
Pos	Team	Pld	W	L	GF	GA	GD	Pts	Qualification or relegation
1	Solent Kestrels (C)	19	17	2	1718	1201	+517	34	Qualification to Playoffs; Quarter-finals
2	Thames Valley Cavaliers	19	17	2	1761	1497	+264	34	Qualification to Playoffs; Quarter-finals
3	Hemel Storm	19	14	5	1735	1574	+161	28	Qualification to Playoffs; First Round
4	Derby Trailblazers	19	14	5	1645	1496	+149	28	Qualification to Playoffs; First Round
5	Team Newcastle	19	13	6	1601	1542	+59	26	Qualification to Playoffs; First Round
6	Essex Rebels	19	9	10	1625	1705	−80	18	Qualification to Playoffs; First Round
7	Worthing Thunder	19	9	10	1554	1637	−83	18	Qualification to Playoffs; First Round
8	Loughborough Riders	19	8	11	1577	1560	+17	16	Qualification to Playoffs; First Round
9	Reading Rockets	19	7	12	1682	1717	−35	14	Qualification to Playoffs; First Round
10	BA London Lions	19	7	12	1484	1595	−111	14	Qualification to Playoffs; First Round
11	Bradford Dragons	19	7	12	1501	1604	−103	14	Qualification to Playoffs; First Round
12	Leicester Warriors	19	5	14	1535	1673	−138	10	Qualification to Playoffs; First Round
13	Oaklands Wolves	19	4	15	1513	1795	−282	8	Qualification to Playoffs; First Round
14	Nottingham Hoods	19	2	17	1285	1620	−335	4	Qualification to Playoffs; First Round

Updated to match(es) played on 18 April 2021. Source: Basketball England Official Website
(C) Champions

=== Playoffs ===
==== First round ====
24 April 2021

Hemel Storm	101–68	Nottingham Hoods

25 April 2021

Derby Trailblazers	105–77	Oaklands Wolves

24 April 2021

Team Newcastle	87–77	Leicester Warriors

25 April 2021

Essex Rebels	73–74	Bradford Dragons

25 April 2021

Worthing Thunder	89–83	BA London Lions

24 April 2021

Loughborough Riders	75–68	Reading Rockets

==== Quarter-finals ====
1 May 2021

Solent Kestrels	78–61	Loughborough Riders

1 May 2021

Thames Valley Cavaliers	89–94	Worthing Thunder

1 May 2021

Hemel Storm	81–69	Bradford Dragons

2 May 2021

Derby Trailblazers	82–84	Team Newcastle

==== Semi-finals ====
8 May 2021

Solent Kestrels	113–69	Team Newcastle

8 May 2021

Hemel Storm	95–82	Worthing Thunder

==== Final ====
15 May 2021
18:00

Box score Report

Solent Kestrels	93–62	Hemel Storm
Scoring by quarter: 28–16, 20–20, 25–16, 20–10
Pts: I Smith 37; Rebs: I Smith 11; Asts: I Smith 9		Pts: G Poleon 17; Rebs: T Oyefusi 9 Asts: B Adeluola 6

National Basketball Centre, Manchester

=== Awards ===
Award	Name	Team
Player of the Year	(United States) Greg Poleon	Hemel Storm
Team of the Year	(United States) Greg Poleon	Hemel Storm
Team of the Year	(Germany) Hakeem Sylla	Thames Valley Cavaliers
Team of the Year	(United States) Taylor Johnson	Thames Valley Cavaliers
Team of the Year	(United States) Ian Smith	Solent Kestrels
Team of the Year	(United States) Travis Charles	Solent Kestrels
British Team of the Year	(Scotland) Kyle Jimenez	Loughborough Riders
British Team of the Year	(England) Orlan Jackman	Solent Kestrels
British Team of the Year	(England) Andre Arissol	Solent Kestrels
British Team of the Year	(England) Morakinyo Williams	Leicester Warriors
British Team of the Year	(England) Blayne Freckleton	Thames Valley Cavaliers
Coach of the Year	(England) Matt Guymon	Solent Kestrels
U-19 Player of the Year	(England) Blake Bowman	Derby Trailblazers
Defensive Player of the Year	(England) Andre Arissol	Solent Kestrels

=== Statistics ===
Player of the Week Awards

Week	Player	Team	Ref	Week	Player	Team	Ref	Week	Player	Team	Ref
1	(United States) Ian Smith	Solent Kestrels		15	(United States) Travis Charles	Solent Kestrels		28	(United States) Mike Williams	Hemel Storm	
2	(Germany) Hakeem Sylla	Thames Valley Cavaliers		16	(England) Orlan Jackman	Solent Kestrels					
3	(England) Blake Bowman	Derby Trailblazers		17	(United States) Taylor Johnson	Thames Valley Cavaliers					
4	(United States) Travis Charles	Solent Kestrels		18	(United States) Greg Poleon	Hemel Storm					
5	(United States) Mike Williams	Hemel Storm		19	(Germany) Hakeem Sylla	Thames Valley Cavaliers					
6	(United States) Zaire Taylor	Worthing Thunder		20	(United States) Greg Poleon	Hemel Storm					
7	(Scotland) Kyle Jimenez	Loughborough Riders		21	(United States) O'Showen Williams	Reading Rockets					
8	(United States) Seth Hawley	Thames Valley Cavaliers		22	(United States) Taylor Johnson	Thames Valley Cavaliers					
9	(United States) David Moya	Team Newcastle		23	(United States) Howard Crawford	Worthing Thunder					
11	(England) Max Richardson	Worthing Thunder		24	(United States) Ian Smith	Solent Kestrels					
12	(United States) Greg Poleon	Hemel Storm		25	(Italy) Brandon Federici	Team Newcastle					
13	(Germany) Hakeem Sylla	Thames Valley Cavaliers		26	(England) Max Richardson	Worthing Thunder					
14	(England) Ethan Price	Essex Rebels		27	(England) Tom Ward	Worthing Thunder					

Scoring

As of 18 April 2021

Rank	Player	Club	PTS
1	(United States) Greg Poleon	Hemel Storm	426
2	(United States) Ronald Blain	Team Newcastle	421
3	(United States) O'Showen Williams	Reading Rockets	415
4	(United States) Mike Williams	Hemel Storm	404
5	(United States) Jordan Santiago	Oaklands Wolves	401
6	(Germany) Hakeem Sylla	Thames Valley Cavaliers	377
7	(United States) Taylor Johnson	Thames Valley Cavaliers	371
8	(England) Victor Olarerin	Nottingham Hoods	341
9	(United States) Howard Crawford	Worthing Thunder	333
10	(Germany) Jonas Dieterich	Loughborough Riders	322

Rebounding

As of 18 April 2021

Rank	Player	Club	REB
1	(Germany) Hakeem Sylla	Thames Valley Cavaliers	233
2	(United States) Greg Poleon	Hemel Storm	204
3	(England) Oliver Stanley	Derby Trailblazers	183
4	(United States) Howard Crawford	Worthing Thunder	163
5	(England) Max Richardson	Worthing Thunder	160
6	(United States) Ronald Blain	Team Newcastle	159
7	(Latvia) Rihards Sulcs	Bradford Dragons	156
8	(Scotland) Kyle Jimenez	Loughborough Riders	148
9	(England) Leome Francis	Reading Rockets	140
10	(Spain) Great Osobor	Bradford Dragons	140

Assists

As of 18 April 2021

Rank	Player	Club	AST
1	(Scotland) Kyle Jimenez	Loughborough Riders	196
2	(United States) David Moya	Team Newcastle	110
3	(United States) Ian Smith	Solent Kestrels	109
4	(England) Charlie Brown	Derby Trailblazers	101
5	(England) Blayne Freckleton	Thames Valley Cavaliers	99
6	(England) Kayne King	Leicester Warriors	96
7	(England) Tom Ward	Worthing Thunder	90
8	(United States) O'Showen Williams	Reading Rockets	88
9	(United States) Zaire Taylor	Worthing Thunder	87
10	(England) Reiss Pinnock	Reading Rockets	84

== L Lynch Trophy ==
The 2020–21 L Lynch Trophy was the inaugural edition of the competition, organised by participating clubs to mark the return to play for men's basketball. 16 teams, the 14 NBL Division 1 sides and the Myerscough and Charnwood academy sides, were split into four regional groups. Each group was intended to play all games within one "bubble" venue. The top 2 sides from each group would advance to the quarter-finals, therein playing a knockout format to determine the overall winners.

=== Group stage ===
Group 1, Myerscough

Pos	Team	Pld	W	L	PF	PA	PD	Pts	Qualification
1	Derby Trailblazers	3	3	0	263	224	+39	6	Qualification to quarter finals
2	Bradford Dragons	3	2	1	239	214	+25	4	Qualification to quarter finals
3	Myerscough College	3	1	2	233	196	+37	2	
4	Team Newcastle	3	0	3	193	294	−101	0	

Updated to match(es) played on 05 December 2020. Source: Basketball England

10 Oct 2020

Bradford Dragons	84–59	Team Newcastle

17 Oct 2020

Bradford Dragons	74–71	Myerscough College

8 Nov 2020

Team Newcastle	81–110	Derby Trailblazers

14 Nov 2020

Bradford Dragons	81–84	Derby Trailblazers

5 Dec 2020

Team Newcastle	53–100	Myerscough College

7 Dec 2020

Derby Trailblazers	69–62	Myerscough College

Group 2, Oaklands

Pos	Team	Pld	W	L	PF	PA	PD	Pts	Qualification
1	Thames Valley Cavaliers	3	3	0	273	228	+45	6	Qualification to quarter finals
2	Hemel Storm	3	2	1	273	236	+37	4	Qualification to quarter finals
3	Reading Rockets	2	0	2	141	168	−27	0	
4	Oaklands Wolves	2	0	2	154	209	−55	0	

Updated to match(es) played on 05 December 2020. Source: Basketball England

10 Oct 2020

Reading Rockets	70–83	Hemel Storm

10 Oct 2020

Oaklands Wolves	74–102	Thames Valley Cavaliers

17 Oct 2020

Reading Rockets	71–85	Thames Valley Cavaliers

17 Oct 2020

Oaklands Wolves	80–107	Hemel Storm

24 Oct 2020

Hemel Storm	83–86	Thames Valley Cavaliers

Reading Rockets	vs.	Oaklands Wolves

Group 3, Loughborough

Pos	Team	Pld	W	L	PF	PA	PD	Pts	Qualification
1	Loughborough Riders	3	3	0	260	217	+43	6	Qualification to quarter finals
2	Nottingham Hoods	3	2	1	239	243	−4	4	Qualification to quarter finals
3	Charnwood College	3	1	2	234	250	−16	2	
4	Leicester Warriors	3	0	3	235	258	−23	0	

Updated to match(es) played on 05 December 2020. Source: Basketball England

17 Oct 2020

Leicester Warriors	88–92	Nottingham Hoods

1 Nov 2020

Loughborough Riders	92–81	Charnwood College

10 Nov 2020

Loughborough Riders	83–80	Leicester Warriors

15 Nov 2020

Charnwood College	83–67	Leicester Warriors

24 Nov 2020

Loughborough Riders	85–56	Nottingham Hoods

29 Nov 2020

Charnwood College	70–91	Nottingham Hoods

Group 4, Solent

Pos	Team	Pld	W	L	PF	PA	PD	Pts	Qualification
1	Solent Kestrels	3	3	0	305	208	+97	6	Qualification to quarter finals
2	Worthing Thunder	3	2	1	243	255	−12	4	Qualification to quarter finals
3	BA London Lions	3	1	2	245	249	−4	2	
4	Essex Rebels	3	0	3	213	294	−81	0	

Updated to match(es) played on 05 December 2020. Source: Basketball England

11 Oct 2020

Solent Kestrels	92–78	BA London Lions

11 Oct 2020

Worthing Thunder	91–78	Essex Rebels

18 Oct 2020

Solent Kestrels	117–61	Essex Rebels

25 Oct 2020

Solent Kestrels	96–69	Worthing Thunder

25 Oct 2020

BA London Lions	86–74	Essex Rebels

22 Nov 2020

BA London Lions	81–83	Worthing Thunder

=== Quarter-finals ===
10 Jan 2021

Derby Trailblazers	73–81	Worthing Thunder

17 Jan 2021

Solent Kestrels	88–68	Hemel Storm

24 Jan 2021

Loughborough Riders	91–68	Bradford Dragons

13 Feb 2021

Thames Valley Cavaliers	105–63	Nottingham Hoods

=== Semi-finals ===
7 Mar 2021

Solent Kestrels	82–80	Worthing Thunder

7 Mar 2021

Thames Valley Cavaliers	86–79	Loughborough Riders

=== Final ===
20 Mar 2021
18:00

Solent Kestrels	87–78	Thames Valley Cavaliers
Scoring by quarter: 25–24, 21–21, 23–12, 18–21
Pts: A Arissol (24); Rebs: O Jackman (12); Asts: I Smith (7)		Pts: T Johnson (21); Rebs: H Sylla (16); Asts: B Freckleton (5)

Morningside Arena, Leicester
