= Albert Margai (basketball) =

English basketball player

No. 20 – Bradford Dragons
- Position: Point guard
- League: English Basketball League

Personal information
- Born: 19 September 1987 (age 39) London, England
- Listed height: 6 ft 0 in (1.83 m)

Career information
- Playing career: 2009–present

Career history
- 2014–present: Essex Leopards

Albert Margai (born 19 September 1987) is an English professional basketball player who currently plays for the Bradford Dragons of the English Basketball League.
