= Manuel Pena Garces =

Manuel Peña Garcés
- Manuel Peña Garcés with Ehime Orange Vikings in 2026

Ehime Orange Vikings
- Position: Head coach
- League: B.League

Personal information
- Born: 2 January 1983 (age 43) Castellón de la Plana, Spain
- Coaching career: 2013–present

Career history

Coaching
- 2013–2018: Reading Rockets
- 2016-2017, 2017-2018: England U15
- 2018–2021: Casademont Zaragoza (assistant)
- 2021-2022: Stadium Casablanca (technical director)
- 2022–2023: Gran Canaria (assistant)
- 2023: Shenzhen Leopards
- 2024: Satria Muda Pertamina
- 2024–2025: Kagoshima Rebnise (associate head coach)
- 2025–present: Ehime Orange Vikings

Career highlights
- As head coach: NBL Division 1 champion (2014); NBL Division 1 National Cup Winner (2014); NBL Division 1 National Trophy Winner (2014); As assistant coach: EuroCup champion (2023)

Manuel Peña Garcés (born 2 January 1983) is a Spanish professional basketball coach who has served as head coach of the Ehime Orange Vikings in Japan's B.League since 2025. He previously coached Satria Muda Pertamina in Indonesia and served as associate head coach of Kagoshima Rebnise. He was also an assistant coach at Gran Canaria when the club won the 2022–23 EuroCup.

== Coaching career ==
=== Early career in England and Spain ===
Peña Garcés began his coaching career in England, working with London Westside before joining Reading Rockets, where he served as head coach and technical director between 2013 and 2018. During his time in England, he also coached the England men's under-15 national team.

In 2018, he returned to Spain to join Basket Zaragoza as an assistant coach, a position he held until 2021. He subsequently served as technical director at Stadium Casablanca during the 2021–22 season.

=== Gran Canaria and international coaching ===
During the 2022–23 season, Peña Garcés worked as an assistant coach at Gran Canaria under head coach Jaka Lakovič. The team won the 2022–23 EuroCup, securing the club's first title in the competition.

In 2023, he joined the coaching staff of the Shenzhen Leopards in China during the preseason.

In 2024, he became head coach of Satria Muda Pertamina in the Indonesian Basketball League.

=== Coaching career in Japan ===
Peña Garcés joined Kagoshima Rebnise as associate head coach for the 2024–25 B.League season.

In May 2025, he was appointed head coach of Ehime Orange Vikings.

In his first season with Ehime, the team finished the 2025–26 regular season with a 38–22 record, placed second in the B2 Western Division and qualified for the playoffs, hosting a postseason series. The team's development during the season was also covered by Japan Forward.

Following the season, Ehime Orange Vikings announced that Peña Garcés would continue as head coach for the 2026–27 campaign.
