= Leicester Warriors =

- League: NBL Division 1
- Established: 2003; 23 years ago
- History: Leicester Warriors; 2003–present
- Arena: Braunstone Leisure Centre
- Capacity: 400
- Location: Leicester, England
- Head coach: (England) Karl Brown
- Website: Official website

The Leicester Warriors are an English semi-professional basketball club from Leicester, Leicestershire. Founded in 2003, the Warriors play their home games at Braunstone Leisure Centre and compete in NBL Division 1, the second tier of the British basketball system. The club runs extensive community programmes and grass root teams in the Leicester area.

== History ==
The club were founded in 2003 by Leicester-born ex-England and Georgia Tech basketball player Karl Brown, with an emphasis on running community based programmes addressing social issues as well as encouraging participation in basketball.

The club won promotion to EBL Division Two after their first season, and spent the following years consolidating their position in the division. The Warriors claimed their first major trophy on 4 March 2007, when they won the Patrons Cup, beating the Bristol Flyers 61–55 in the final at the Newcastle Arena, and seeing former Leicester Riders player Drew Barrett named MVP. The 2008–09 season also saw another leap forward for the Warriors, claiming third place in the league and winning promotion to Division One for the following season, where the team has competed ever since.

In September 2015, the club confirmed that 2001-born Kareem Queeley had signed a 2-year contract with basketball powerhouse Real Madrid.

== Players ==
=== Current squad ===
Note: Flags indicate national team, as has been defined under FIBA eligibility rules. Players may hold more than one non-FIBA nationality.

No.	Pos.	Nat.	Player
5	G	(England) ENG	Ayende Lewis
7	G	(England) ENG	Martyn Gayle
9	PG	(England) ENG	Carl Pearson
10	F	(England) ENG	Josh Pollock
11	F	(England) ENG	Al-Amin Willan
12	G	(England) ENG	Akiel Dublin
14	F	(England) ENG	Henri Langton
15	F	(England) ENG	Ehlji Toure Jabby
	G	(England) ENG	Alex Wilson

=== Notable former players ===
Note: Flags indicate national team eligibility at FIBA-sanctioned events. Players may hold other non-FIBA nationalities not displayed.

Criteria

To appear in this section a player must have either:

- Set a club record or won an individual award while at the club
- Played at least one official international match for their national team at any time
- Played at least one official NBA match at any time.

- (United Kingdom) Kareem Queeley

== Season-by-season records ==
Season	Division	Tier	Regular Season						Post-Season	National Cup
Season	Division	Tier	Finish	Played	Wins	Losses	Points	Win %	Post-Season	National Cup
Leicester Warriors
2003-04	D3 Sou	4	2nd	18	15	3	30	0.833	Quarter-finals	
2004-05	D2	3	7th	20	8	12	16	0.400	Quarter-finals	
2005-06	D2	3	10th	22	9	13	18	0.409	Did not qualify	
2006-07	D2	3	6th	22	11	11	22	0.500	Quarter-finals	
2007-08	D2	3	4th	22	13	9	26	0.591	Semi-finals	
2008-09	D2	3	3rd	22	15	7	30	0.682	Quarter-finals	
2009-10	D1	2	5th	22	13	9	26	0.591	Quarter-finals	
2010-11	D1	2	9th	18	6	12	12	0.333	Did not qualify	
2011-12	D1	2	5th	24	15	9	30	0.625	Semi-finals	
2012-13	D1	2	8th	26	12	14	24	0.462	Quarter-finals	
2013-14	D1	2	14th	26	2	24	4	0.077	Did not qualify	
2014-15	D1	2	9th	24	9	15	18	0.429	Did not qualify	
2015-16	D1	2	9th	26	10	16	20	0.385	Did not qualify	
2016-17	D1	2	9th	26	11	15	22	0.423	Did not qualify	
2017-18	D1	2	9th	24	9	15	18	0.375	Did not qualify	
2018-19	D1	2	8th	26	12	14	24	0.462	Quarter-finals	
2019-20	D1	2	9th	23	10	13	20	0.435	No playoffs	4th round
2020-21	D1	2	12th	19	5	14	10	0.263	1st round	No competition
2021-22	D1	2	13th	26	4	22	8	0.154	Did not qualify	3rd round
2022-23	D2 Nor	3	7th	22	8	14	16	0.354	Did not qualify	4th round
