= Nottingham Hoods =

- League: BCB
- Established: 2009; 17 years ago
- History: Nottingham Hoods; 2009–present
- Arena: Harvey Hadden Sports Village
- Capacity: 1000
- Location: Nottingham, Nottinghamshire
- Team colours
- Head coach: (United Kingdom) Ben Stanley
- Ownership: Lee English
- Website: Official website

The Nottingham Hoods are a semi-professional basketball club from the city of Nottingham, England. The Hoods, formed in 2009, compete in British Championship Basketball, the second tier of the British basketball system, and play their home games at the Harvey Hadden Sports Village.

== History ==
The Hoods were originally formed in 2009, with the men's team taking to the court as part of what was then branded as the EBL Division 4 Midlands League. The team had an impressive first season in Division Four, recording thirteen wins in the league for a second place in the regular season. The end of season playoffs were to be an even greater success though, with the Hoods coming through the National Playoffs to make the final against the unbeaten Birmingham Mets. Despite the odds, the Hoods pulled off a 59-56 victory over the Mets to be crowned 2010 National Division Four Champions, and win promotion to Division Three in their first season.

For the next three years, the club maintained a mid-table place in Division 3 (North), avoiding entanglement with the annual relegation battle while falling short of the end-of-season playoffs. This period of relative safety almost came to a disastrous end in the 2013-14 season, when an underachieving team won only 6 league games all season, and only avoided relegation by virtue of a final-day 58-60 win over fellow strugglers Derby Trailblazers II. The close brush with the spectre of relegation brought forward a renewed hunger for victory in the following year though, with the team pushing rivals Liverpool close all through the season, eventually finishing as runners-up in the league, and winning promotion to EBL Division 2 following an end-of-season review by Basketball England.

The Hoods quickly established themselves in the third tier, finishing their first two seasons in the playoff positions, and reaching the semi-finals of the playoffs and Patrons Cup. In the 2017-18 season, the club took another step forward, claiming 20 wins in a 22 game season and the Division 2 League Championship. Although denied the league and playoff double losing a nail-biting playoff final 77-80 to the Thames Valley Cavaliers, both teams had already secured a place in the second tier for the 2018-19 season.

== Players ==
Nottingham Hoods 26-27 roster
Players
Coaches

| Pos. | No. | Nat. | Name | Ht. |
|---|---|---|---|---|
| G | | (United Kingdom) | Akano, Sam | 6 ft 0 in (1.83 m) |
| G | | (United States) | Moore, Christian | 6 ft 1 in (1.85 m) |
| G | | (United Kingdom) | Hannick, Jacob | 6 ft 1 in (1.85 m) |
| G | | (United States) | Polak, Camden | 6 ft 2 in (1.88 m) |
| G | | (United Kingdom) | Sandu-Nelson, Aaron | 6 ft 2 in (1.88 m) |
| G | | (United Kingdom) | Mughal, Faaris | 6 ft 2 in (1.88 m) |
| F | | (United Kingdom) | Savery-Richards, Micah | 6 ft 4 in (1.93 m) |
| F | | (United Kingdom) | Perry, Simeon | 6 ft 6 in (1.98 m) |
| F | | (United Kingdom) | Smith-White, Joshua | 6 ft 6 in (1.98 m) |
| F | | (United States) | Kahn, Cameron | 6 ft 6 in (1.98 m) |
| F | | (United Kingdom) | Bailey, Elliot | 6 ft 7 in (2.01 m) |
| F | | (United States) | Triggs, Luke | 6 ft 7 in (2.01 m) |

Head coach

(United Kingdom) Ben Stanley

Legend

- (C) Team captain
- Injured

== Season-by-season records ==
| Season | Division | Tier | Regular Season | | | | | | Post-Season | National Cup |
| Season | Division | Tier | Finish | Played | Wins | Losses | Points | Win % | Post-Season | National Cup |
|---|---|---|---|---|---|---|---|---|---|---|
Nottingham Hoods
| 2009-10 | D4 Mid | 5 | 2nd | 16 | 13 | 3 | 26 | 0.813 | Winners | 1st round |
| 2010-11 | D3 Nor | 4 | 7th | 22 | 9 | 13 | 18 | 0.409 | Did not qualify | 2nd round |
| 2011-12 | D3 Nor | 4 | 9th | 22 | 8 | 14 | 16 | 0.364 | Did not qualify | 1st round |
| 2012-13 | D3 Nor | 4 | 7th | 22 | 12 | 10 | 22 | 0.545 | Did not qualify | 2nd round |
| 2013-14 | D3 Nor | 4 | 9th | 20 | 6 | 14 | 12 | 0.300 | Did not qualify | 1st round |
| 2014-15 | D3 Nor | 4 | 2nd | 22 | 19 | 3 | 38 | 0.864 | Quarter-final | 1st round |
| 2015-16 | D2 | 3 | 4th | 22 | 15 | 7 | 30 | 0.682 | Semi-final | 3rd round |
| 2016-17 | D2 | 3 | 6th | 22 | 10 | 12 | 20 | 0.455 | Quarter-final | 3rd round |
| 2017-18 | D2 | 3 | 1st | 22 | 20 | 2 | 40 | 0.909 | Runners Up | 3rd round |
| 2018-19 | D1 | 2 | 10th | 26 | 11 | 15 | 22 | 0.423 | Did not qualify | 4th round |
| 2019-20 | D1 | 2 | 10th | 23 | 7 | 16 | 16 | 0.304 | Did not qualify | 4th round |
| 2020-21 | D1 | 2 | 14th | 19 | 2 | 17 | 4 | 0.105 | 1st round | No competition |
| 2021-22 | D1 | 2 | 4th | 26 | 18 | 8 | 36 | 0.692 | Semi-finals | Quarter-finals |
| 2022-23 | D1 | 2 | 10th | 26 | 11 | 15 | 22 | 0.423 | Did not qualify | 4th round |
| 2023-24 | D1 | 2 | 8th | 24 | 11 | 13 | 22 | 0.438 | Quarter-finals | |
| 2024-25 | D1 | 2 | 10th | 24 | 9 | 15 | 18 | 0.375 | Did Not Qualify | |
