= William Kempe (disambiguation) =

William Kempe was a 17th-century English actor and dancer, one of the original actors in Shakespeare's plays.

William Kempe may also refer to:

- William Kempe (burgess), see List of members of the Virginia House of Burgesses

== See also ==
- William Kemp (disambiguation)
