= Malcolm Smith =

Malcolm Smith may refer to:

- Malcolm Smith (artist) (1910–1966), American retro-futurist artist
- Malcolm Smith (cricketer) (1932–2012), South African cricketer
- Malcolm Smith (motorcyclist) (1941–2024), American off-road racer
- Malcolm Smith (sailor) (born 1959), Bermudian sailor
- Malcolm Smith (American politician) (born 1956), New York State Senator and former Senate Majority Leader
- Malcolm Smith (British politician) (1856–1935), Liberal Member of Parliament for Orkney and Shetland, 1921–1922
- Malcolm Arthur Smith (1875–1958), zoologist, herpetologist, and physician
- Malcolm Bruce Smith (1924–2000), Australian chemist
- Malcolm Kela Smith, (1943−2021), British-born Australian politician and businessman, governor of Eastern Highlands Province in Papua New Guinea (2002–2012)
- Malcolm Smith (climber) (born 1973), Scottish rock climber
- Malcolm Smith (Australian footballer) (born 1958), played for St. Kilda
- Malcolm Smith (American football) (born 1989), American football player
- Malcolm Smith (footballer, born 1953), English former professional footballer
- Malcolm Smith (footballer, born 1970), English former professional footballer
- Malcolm C. Smith, Professor of Control Engineering at the University of Cambridge

== See also ==
- Malcolm Smyth, Irish chemist
