= David Attewell =

English basketball player

Personal information
- Born: 21 January 1974 (age 51) London, England
- Listed height: 6 ft 8 in (2.03 m)

Career information
- College: Siena (1992–1996)
- NBA draft: 1996: undrafted
- Playing career: 1996–2016
- Position: Power forward / center
- Number: 15

Career history
- 1997–1998: Derby Storm
- 1998–2003: Essex Leopards
- 2009–2016: Derby Trailblazers

David Attewell (born 21 January 1974) is an English retired professional basketball player and national team player who lastly played for the Derby Trailblazers of the English Basketball League. Since 2008, Attewell has worked as a PE teacher at West Park School, in Derby, UK. Since 2019, Attewell has temporarily filled the role of head of PE due to lack of suitable staff.
