= David Craig =

David Craig may refer to:

- David Craig (Northern Irish footballer) (born 1966), Northern Irish footballer who played for Newcastle United
- David Craig (Scottish footballer) (born 1969)
- David Craig (Australian footballer) (born 1953), Australian rules footballer
- David Craig, Baron Craig of Radley (born 1929), retired British Chief of the Defence Staff and Marshal of the RAF
- David Craig (author), British former management consultant and writer criticising management consultancy
- David R. Craig (born 1949), American politician
- David P. Craig (1919–2015), Australian scientist
- David Craig (Wisconsin politician) (born 1979), American politician
- David W. Craig, commander of the Canadian Forces Naval Reserve
- David Craig, a pseudonym of the Welsh writer James Tucker (born 1929)
- David Millar Craig (1878–1965), BBC's first Controller for Scotland
- David Craig (field hockey), British international field hockey player

== See also ==
- Craig David (born 1981), singer
