= West Hertfordshire Warriors =

- League: English Basketball League (At time of closing)
- Established: 1998
- Folded: 2007
- History: West Hertfordshire Warriors; 1998-2007
- Arena: Herts Sports Village
- Location: Hatfield, Hertfordshire
- Head coach: (United Kingdom) Tony Harrison (At time of closing)
Home	Away

The West Herts Warriors was a basketball club from Hatfield, Hertfordshire, which operated two Men's teams and a Women's team in the English Basketball League at the time of their demise in 2007. They played their home games at the University of Hertfordshire's Herts Sports Village.

Two teams currently competing in the English Basketball League have distant ties to the Warriors; Hemel Storm, which grew out of the Warriors' reserve team, and the Hertfordshire Warriors, which emerged from the team's junior program shortly after the original senior team was disbanded.

== Franchise history ==
During their nearly ten years in operation, the club had achieved considerable success, climbing steadily through the ranks of the English Basketball League, culminating in the team winning the Men's Division Two title in the 2005/2006 season, earning them promotion to the top English division for the following year. To complement the success of the Men's team, a second Men's team was entered in Division Four (Midlands/South) for the following season, with a Women's team also being entered in Division Two (South) in 2007/2008.

However, in October 2007 the Men's first team suddenly withdrew from the League due to financial problems, following the loss of a major sponsor. Despite the loss of the flagship team, the club took steps to separate their Junior program to operate as a distinct organization to ensure their survival. Similar steps were taken with the Men's second team and the Women's team, allowing both to complete the 2007/2008 season, finishing in 4th and 7th place respectively. The Women's team disbanded shortly after, while the now-independent Men's team moved to Watford to begin a slow, nomadic period of re-invention.

== See also ==
- Hemel Storm
