= Loughborough Riders =

- League: BCB
- Established: 2011; 15 years ago
- History: Loughborough Student Riders; 2011-2018; Loughborough Riders; 2018-present
- Arena: Loughborough University
- Location: Loughborough, England
- Team colours
- Head coach: (United Kingdom) Will Maynard
- Website: Official website

The Loughborough Riders are a basketball team based in the town of Loughborough, England. The Riders compete in BCB, the second tier of the British basketball system. The programme was reestablished in 2011 and is primarily based on the Loughborough University team that competes in the British Universities and Colleges Sport league, with the addition of other professional and semi-professional players based in the region. The Loughborough University team dates back to the 1950s and having won the British Championships on eleven occasions. The team's head coach is Will Maynard, who assists the coaching team of the Leicester Riders, with whom Loughborough have a player development pathway.

== Honours ==
- Men's National Cup Winners: 2018-19 (1)
- Men's Division 1 League Champions: 2017-18 (1)

== Players ==
Loughborough Riders 26-27 roster
Players
Coaches

Pos.	No.	Nat.	Name	Ht.
G		(United Kingdom)	Campbell, Liam	5 ft 10 in (1.78 m)
G		(United States)	Henderson, Kurtis	5 ft 11 in (1.80 m)
G		(United Kingdom)	Curran, Tristan	6 ft 0 in (1.83 m)
G		(United Kingdom)	Curran, Oscar	6 ft 2 in (1.88 m)
G		(United Kingdom)	Hadley, Dan	6 ft 3 in (1.91 m)
G		(United Kingdom)	King-Danchie, Moziah	6 ft 3 in (1.91 m)
G		(United Kingdom)	Karras, Panos	6 ft 4 in (1.93 m)
G		(United States)	Cook, Jalen	6 ft 5 in (1.96 m)
F		(United Kingdom)	Ogunjobi, Aaron	6 ft 5 in (1.96 m)
F		(Canada) (United Kingdom)	Chamberlain, Simon	6 ft 7 in (2.01 m)
F		(United Kingdom)	Saeed, Fahad	6 ft 8 in (2.03 m)
F		(United Kingdom)	Ovia, Stephen	6 ft 9 in (2.06 m)

Head coach

(United Kingdom) Will Maynard

Legend

- (C) Team captain
- Injured

=== Notable former players ===
Note: Flags indicate national team eligibility at FIBA-sanctioned events. Players may hold other non-FIBA nationalities not displayed.

Criteria

To appear in this section a player must have either:

- Set a club record or won an individual award while at the club
- Played at least one official international match for their national team at any time
- Played at least one official NBA match at any time.

- (United Kingdom) Conner Washington
- (United Kingdom) Harrison Gamble

== Season-by-season records ==
Season	Division	Tier	Regular Season						Post-Season	National Cup
Season	Division	Tier	Finish	Played	Wins	Losses	Points	Win %	Post-Season	National Cup
Loughborough Students Riders
2011-12	D3 Nor	4	2nd	22	18	4	36	0.818	Semi-finals	2nd round
2012-13	D2	3	5th	22	12	10	24	0.545	Semi-finals	3rd round
2013-14	D2	3	5th	20	10	10	20	0.500	Quarter-finals	Quarter-finals
2014-15	D2	3	4th	22	14	8	28	0.636	Semi-finals	2nd round
2015-16	D2	3	2nd	22	17	5	34	0.773	Quarter-finals	Semi-finals
2016-17	D1	2	5th	26	15	11	30	0.577	Runners-Up	4th round
2017-18	D1	2	1st	24	20	4	40	0.833	Semi-finals	Semi-finals
Loughborough Riders
2018-19	D1	2	3rd	26	19	7	38	0.731	Semi-finals	Winners, beating Solent
2019-20	D1	2	6th	23	15	8	33	0.652	No competition	Semi-finals
2020-21	D1	2	8th	19	8	11	16	0.421	Quarter-finals	No competition
2020-21	D1	2	11th	26	8	18	16	0.308	Did not qualify	3rd round
2022-23	D1	2	5th	26	15	11	30	0.578	Quarter-finals	5th round
2023-24	D1	2	6th	24	14	10	28	0.538	Quarter-finals	

== See also ==
- Leicester Riders (men)
- Leicester Riders (women)
