= City of Birmingham Rockets =

- League: BCB
- Established: 2003; 23 years ago
- History: City of Birmingham; 2003–2017; City of Birmingham Rockets; 2017–present
- Arena: Nechells Centre
- Capacity: 400
- Location: Birmingham, England
- Website: Official website

The City of Birmingham Rockets are an English professional basketball club based in the city of Birmingham, West Midlands.

== History ==
The club was formed in 2003 as the City of Birmingham Basketball Club.

The founders of the club were looking to provide regular opportunities and a clear pathway for young people from Birmingham and the surrounding areas to play basketball. The club runs representative teams at various age levels from Under-11s through to seniors, based in one of the most deprived wards in the country, with participants drawn from all parts of the city.

The senior men's team entered the English Basketball League in 2014. The volunteer-led organisation's name was then changed to the City of Birmingham Rockets in August 2017 to recognise a partnership set up with Houston Rockets and NBA legend Hakeem Olajuwon.

Despite spending most of their existence with a focus on youth development and competing in the lower divisions of the English Basketball League, with new backing it has been mooted that the Rockets could join the British Basketball League in the near future; however, these plans appear to be hold at least for the 2019–20 season.

The Rockets' home venue was refurbished in 2021 with funding from 2K, the American video game company behind the NBA 2K game series.

== Players ==
City Of Birmingham Rockets 26-27 roster
Players
Coaches

| Pos. | No. | Nat. | Name | Ht. |
|---|---|---|---|---|
| G | 77 | (United Kingdom) | Dawes, Jordan | 6 ft 2 in (1.88 m) |
| G | 14 | (United Kingdom) | Powell, Zack | 6 ft 2 in (1.88 m) |
| G | 1 | (United Kingdom) | McGregor, Lucas | 6 ft 2 in (1.88 m) |
| G | 7 | (United States) | Bain, Spencer | 6 ft 2 in (1.88 m) |
| G | 3 | (United Kingdom) | Donaldson, Eric | 6 ft 3 in (1.91 m) |
| F | 0 | (United States) | Blain, Ronald | 6 ft 5 in (1.96 m) |
| F | | (United Kingdom) | Jackman, Orlan | 6 ft 7 in (2.01 m) |
| F | 88 | (United Kingdom) | Edozie, Dan | 6 ft 8 in (2.03 m) |
| F | 15 | (United Kingdom) | Hodgkinson, Isaac | 6 ft 7 in (2.01 m) |
| G | 5 | (United Kingdom) | Mutothori, Adrian | 6 ft 0 in (1.83 m) |
| F | 19 | (United Kingdom) | Ono, Owen | 6 ft 5 in (1.96 m) |
| G | 23 | (United Kingdom) | Martin, Callum | 6 ft 1 in (1.85 m) |

Head coach

(United States) Charles Smith

Assistant coach(es)

(British Virgin Islands) Leslee Smith

Legend

- (C) Team captain
- Injured

Notable former players

Note: Flags indicate national team eligibility at FIBA-sanctioned events. Players may hold other non-FIBA nationalities not displayed.

Criteria

To appear in this section a player must have either:

- Set a club record or won an individual award while at the club
- Played at least one official international match for their national team at any time
- Played at least one official NBA match at any time.

- (United Kingdom) Myles Hesson
- (United Kingdom) Kofi Josephs

== Season-by-season records ==
| Season | Division | Tier | Regular Season | | | | | | Post-Season | National Cup |
| Season | Division | Tier | Finish | Played | Wins | Losses | Points | Win % | Post-Season | National Cup |
|---|---|---|---|---|---|---|---|---|---|---|
City of Birmingham
| 2014–15 | D4 Mid | 5 | 3rd | 16 | 9 | 7 | 18 | 0.563 | 1st round | Did not compete |
| 2015–16 | Dev SW | 5 | 3rd | 20 | 12 | 8 | 24 | 0.600 | 1st round | 1st round |
| 2016–17 | D4 Mid | 5 | 5th | 18 | 10 | 8 | 20 | 0.556 | Did not qualify | 1st round |
City of Birmingham Rockets
| 2017–18 | D4 Mid | 5 | 4th | 22 | 16 | 6 | 32 | 0.727 | Did not qualify | 1st round |
| 2018–19 | D4 Mid | 5 | 5th | 16 | 8 | 8 | 16 | 0.500 | Did not qualify | 3rd round |
| 2019–20 | D3 Mid | 4 | 2nd | 21 | 17 | 4 | 35 | 0.810 | No playoffs | 1st round |
| 2020–21 | D2 Nor | 3 | Season cancelled due to COVID-19 pandemic | | | | | | | |
| 2021–22 | D2 Nor | 3 | 7th | 22 | 9 | 13 | 19 | 0.409 | Did not qualify | 2nd round |
| 2022–23 | D2 Nor | 3 | 1st | 22 | 21 | 1 | 42 | 0.955 | Winners | 2nd round |
| 2023–24 | D1 | 2 | 9th | 24 | 9 | 15 | 18 | 0.375 | Did not qualify | |
| 2024–25 | D1 | 2 | | | | | | | | |

== Honours ==
- NBL Division 2 Playoffs (1): 2022-23
