= Malcolm Bruce Smith =

Malcolm Bruce Smith (29 February 1924 – 27 July 2000) was an Australian chemist who studied the egg protein ovalbumin. He described the formation of S-ovalbumin from the native form (R-ovalbumin) as the pH of eggs rises over time.

Smith was raised and attended schools in Angaston and Nuriootpa in South Australia. He won Country Scholarship to study Industrial Chemistry at the South Australian School of Mines in Adelaide. His studies were interrupted by World War II, when he was recruited to a laboratory position by the Munitions Department.

After some years working for a public analyst in Adelaide, C.A.Smythe & Co, he was engaged by the Australian Council for Scientific and Industrial Research (later renamed the C.S.I.R.O) as a Technical Officer at the Division of Food Preservation and Transport in Sydney. Smith remained in this employment until retiring on 29 February 1984 from the position of Principal Research Scientist at the then named Division of Food Research.

Smith was co-author of a history of his Division, published in 1979. He was awarded degrees of BSc and MSc at the University of New South Wales in 1956 and 1959, and was awarded the degree of Doctor of Science by that University in 1980. His discourse discussed his published research into 'Physico-Chemical Studies on Proteins, with Particular Reference to the Structure and Stability of Egg Proteins.'

Smith married Josephine Lucy in Adelaide in 1945, and had two daughters and two sons. He died from diffuse lewy body disease in 2000.
