= David Craig (Australian footballer) =

Australian rules footballer

Personal information
- Full name: David Craig
- Born: 16 February 1953 (age 73)
- Original teams: Wodonga, Wodan
- Height: 185 cm (6 ft 1 in)
- Weight: 75 kg (165 lb)

Playing career^{1}
Years	Club	Games (Goals)
1973	North Melbourne	1 (0)
- ^{1} Playing statistics correct to the end of 1973.

David Craig (born 16 February 1953) is a former Australian rules footballer who played with North Melbourne in the Victorian Football League (VFL).
