= British Championship Basketball =

Professional basketball league in Great Britain

- Founded: 2025; 1 year ago
- First season: 2025–26
- Country: Great Britain
- Federation: British Basketball
- Confederation: FIBA Europe
- Number of teams: 14
- Level on pyramid: 2
- Domestic cup: BCB Trophy
- Website: britishchampionshipbasketball.uk
- 2025–26 British Championship Basketball season

British Championship Basketball (BCB) is a men's professional basketball league. Established in 2025, the competition replaces Division One of the National Basketball League (NBL) as the second-tier men's basketball competition in Great Britain.

== History ==
In 1987, there was a breakaway by the elite clubs of the time, looking to form a fully professional league in Great Britain. The new league, operated by a new body, British Basketball League, was established as the country's top and only fully professional basketball league. Division One of the National Basketball League (NBL) became the country's second tier competition. From 1987, the British Basketball League (BBL), and latterly from 2024, and Super League Basketball (SLB) have been the pre-eminent, top level basketball competitions in Great Britain.

In June 2025, all 13 NBL Division One men’s clubs from the previous season, as well as Bristol Flyers II, promoted from NBL Division Two, proposed coming together to set up their own competition, called British Championship Basketball, or BCB for short, as a new second-tier professional British basketball league.

== Teams ==
League

| Team | Location | Colours | Arena | Capacity | Founded |
|---|---|---|---|---|---|
| Bristol Flyers II | (England) Bristol | | SGS College Arena | 750 | 2006 |
| Bristol Hurricanes | (England) Bristol | | UWE Centre for Sport | - | 2017 |
| City of Birmingham Rockets | (England) Birmingham | | Nechell Wellbeing Centre | 400 | 2003 |
| Derby Trailblazers | (England) Derby | | University of Derby | 600 | 2000 |
| Essex Rebels | (England) Colchester | | Essex Sport Arena | 1,655 | 2014 |
| Hemel Storm | (England) Hemel Hempstead | | Hemel Leisure Centre | 600 | 2006 |
| London Cavaliers | (England) London (Uxbridge) | | Uxbridge College | 300 | 2011 |
| Loughborough Riders | (England) Loughborough | | Sir David Wallace Centre | 600 | 2011 |
| Milton Keynes Breakers | (England) Milton Keynes | | Bletchley Leisure Centre | 300 | 2017 |
| Newcastle Knights | (England) Newcastle upon Tyne | | University Sport Centre | - | 2014 |
| Nottingham Hoods | (England) Nottingham | | Harvey Hadden | 300 | 2009 |
| Reading Rockets | (England) Reading | | Loddon Valley Leisure Centre | 500 | 1997 |
| Worthing Thunder | (England) Worthing | | Worthing Leisure Centre | 600 | 1999 |
| Yorkshire Dragons | (England) Halifax | | Calderdale College | 300 | 2001 |

BCB Trophy

| Team | Location | Colours | Arena | Capacity | Founded |
|---|---|---|---|---|---|
| Cardiff Met Archers | (Wales) Cardiff | | Cardiff Met Arena | 500 | 1999 |
| Falkirk Fury | (Scotland) Falkirk | | Grangemouth Sports Complex | 300 | 1992 |
| Gloucester City Kings | (England) Gloucester | | Oxtsalls Arena | 500 | 2021 |
| Oaklands Wolves | (England) St Albans | | Oaklands College | 200 | 2009 |
| Plymouth Raiders | (England) Plymouth | | Life Centre | 400 | 2023 |
| Portsmouth Force | (England) Portsmouth | | University of Portsmouth | 400 | 2022 |

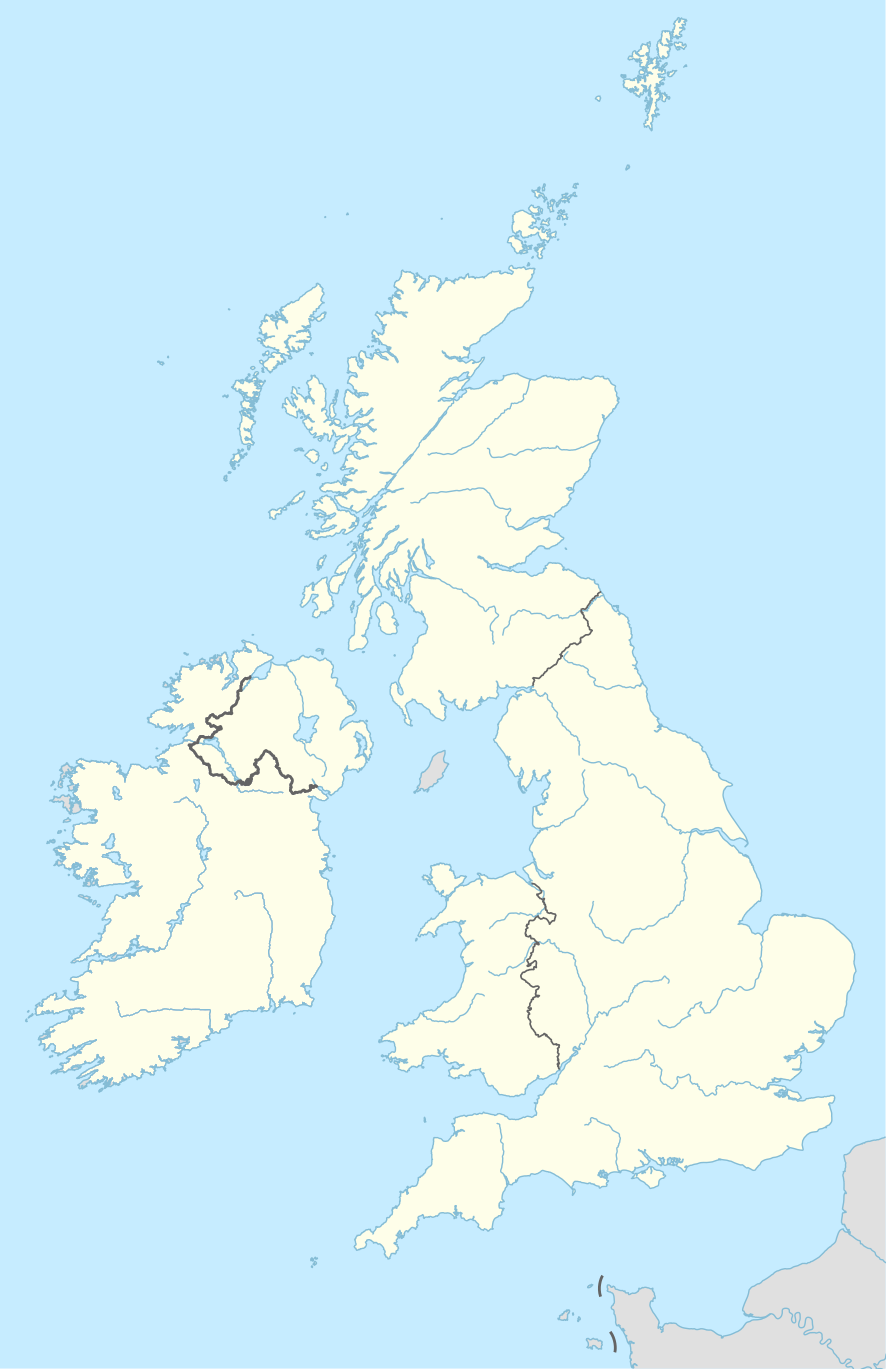
Locations of the 2025-26 BCB teams

== See also ==
- National Basketball League
- Scottish Basketball Championship Men
- British Basketball League (1987–2024)
- Super League Basketball
- Super League Basketball Women
