= William Kemp =

William Kemp may refer to:

- William Kempe (died 1603), also spelled William Kemp, English actor and dancer, one of the original actors in William Shakespeare's plays
- William D. Kemp (architect), architect
- William E. Kemp (1889–1968), mayor of Kansas City, Missouri, U.S.
- William Herbert Kemp (1881–1957), British chemist and politician
- Will Kemp (actor, born 1977), contemporary film actor
- Willy Kemp (1925–2021), Luxembourgish road bicycle racer
- Willie Kemp (1888–1965), Scottish singer and writer
- Willie Kemp (basketball) (born 1987), American basketball player
- Billy Kemp (born 1977), American actor, television executive, producer, and casting director

== See also ==
- William Kempe (disambiguation)
