= London Cavaliers B.C. =

London Cavaliers
- League: BCB
- Established: 2011; 15 years ago
- History: Bracknell Cobras (2011 - 2014); Thames Valley Cavaliers (2014 - 2024); London Cavaliers (2024 - present)
- Arena: Uxbridge College
- Location: Uxbridge, West London
- Head coach: (United States) Will Wise
- Ownership: Vince Macaulay; Nhamo Shire
- Website: Official website

The London Cavaliers are a professional basketball club, based in the Uxbridge area of West London, England. The Cavaliers, formed in 2011, play their home games at Uxbridge College and compete in NBL Division 1, the second tier of the British basketball system.

== History ==
Formed in 2011, the club, which started life as the senior team for the Bracknell Cobras junior basketball club, entered National League competition for the first time in 2012. The men's team split from the junior club to form the Cavaliers in 2014, and with an focus on elite player development, the team was promoted to the National Basketball League Division 1 in 2018. In their first season in Division 1, they secured a top 4 finish and reached the semi-finals of the end-of-season Playoffs. In 2024, the club was acquired by Vince Macaulay and Nhamo Shire. On 18 December 2024, Thames Valley Cavaliers announced that they had Rebranded to London Cavaliers.

== Honours ==
D2 Playoff Champions (2): 2016-17, 2017-18
D3 Playoff Champions (1): 2015-16
D3 South League Champions (1): 2015-16
D4 Playoff Champions (1): 2012-13
D4 South West League Champions (1): 2012-13

== Players ==
London Cavaliers 26-27 roster
Players
Coaches

Pos.	No.	Nat.	Name	Ht.
G		(United Kingdom)	Manning, Juan	6 ft 4 in (1.93 m)
G		(United Kingdom)	Poorman, Zain	6 ft 4 in (1.93 m)
G		(United States)	Roberts, AJ	6 ft 5 in (1.96 m)
F		(United Kingdom)	Richards, Joe	6 ft 7 in (2.01 m)

Head coach

(United States) Will Wise

Legend

- (C) Team captain
- Injured

== Season-by-season records ==
Season	Division	Tier	Regular Season						Post-Season	National Cup	Head coach
Season	Division	Tier	Finish	Played	Wins	Losses	Points	Win %	Post-Season	National Cup	Head coach
Bracknell Cobras
2012-13	D4 SW	5	1st	18	18	0	36	1.000	Winners	2nd round	
2013-14	D3 Sou	4	6th	20	10	10	20	0.500	Did not qualify	1st round	
Thames Valley Cavaliers
2014–15	D3 Sou	4	2nd	18	15	3	30	0.833	Semi-finals	2nd round	Robert Banks
2015–16	D3 Sou	4	1st	21	21	0	42	1.000	Winners	2nd round	Robert Banks
2016–17	D2	3	3rd	22	18	4	36	0.818	Winners	3rd round	Robert Banks
2017–18	D2	3	2nd	22	18	4	36	0.818	Winners	Quarter-finals	Robert Banks
2018–19	D1	2	4th	26	16	10	32	0.615	Semi-finals	Quarter-finals	Robert Banks
2019–20	D1	2	2nd	23	18	5	39	0.783	No playoffs	3rd round	Robert Banks
2020–21	D1	2	2nd	19	17	2	34	0.895	Quarter-finals	No competition	Robert Banks
2021–22	D1	2	2nd	26	20	6	40	0.769	Semi-finals	Semi-finals	Robert Banks
2022–23	D1	2	6th	26	13	13	26	0.500	Quarter-finals	Quarter-finals	Robert Banks
2023–24	D1	2	10th	24	8	16	16	0.333	Did not qualify		Robert Banks
London Cavaliers
2024–25	D1	2									Nigel Lloyd

== Record in BBL competitions ==
Season	Competition	Round	Opponent	Home	Away
2020-21	BBL Trophy	R1	Surrey Scorchers		L 100-101
2021-22	BBL Trophy	R1	Hemel Storm	W 86-78	
2021-22	BBL Trophy	QF	Glasgow Rocks	L 91-97 (OT)	
2022-23	BBL Trophy	R1	Sheffield Sharks		L 66-98
