= Reading Rockets =

English professional basketball club

- League: BCB
- Established: 1997; 29 years ago
- History: Reading Rockets (1997–present)
- Arena: Loddon Valley Leisure Centre
- Capacity: 500
- Location: Reading, Berkshire
- Team colours
- Head coach: (Azerbaijan) Samit Nuruzade
- Ownership: Gary Johnson, Helen Johnson
- Website: Official website

The Reading Rockets are an English professional basketball club based in the town of Reading, England. Founded in 1997, the Rockets compete in British Championship Basketball , the second tier of the British basketball system.

== History ==
The Rockets were formed in 1997 by current owner Gary Johnson together with his son Matt, starting in Division 3. The club won promotion at the first attempt, and in the National Basketball League reorganisation of 2000, England Basketball replaced Division 1 with the eight-team NBL Conference as the second-tier. Subsequently, Division 2 became Division 1 where the Rockets found themselves.

The Rockets remained in Division 1 for just one season, finishing second and beating Oxford in the Championship Final, thus winning promotion to the NBL Conference. In the 2001–02 season they finished seventh in the NBL Conference. In the following season, the Rockets continued their rise, finishing in third place. In 2003, the National Basketball League was rebranded as the English Basketball League, and once again was restructured with a new format, with Rockets finishing in second place in the new EBL Division 1. In the following season the Rockets finished third and were runners-up to Worthing Thunder in both the 2005–06 and 2006–07 seasons.

The club completed its most successful season ever in 2008–09, going undefeated to win all four national championships. The club applied to join the British Basketball League (Top division of the British Basketball System) as a member franchise for the 2012–13 season but was unsuccessful. In the 2013–14 season the Rockets completed the treble and were Play Off Championship finalists. Rockets' Ladies won the Division 2 Southern league in 2014. As a stepping stone into the Senior Men's team, the Rockets' run academies at the John Madejski Academy and the Henley College.

The club has squads ranging from developing Under-12s to the Division 1 senior men's side, and coaching staff regularly visit local schools and run satellite clubs as part of the Community Rockets scheme.

In 2022, the Rockets applied to join the British Basketball League starting from the 2023–24 season.

In the 2024–25 season, the Rockets won the National Cup in January, the KitKing Trophy in March, and the NBL1 D1 playoff championship in April.

== Men ==
=== Honours ===
- Men's National League Division 1 League Champions (3): 2008/2009, 2012/13, 2013/14
- Men's National Cup Winners (4): 2004/05, 2008/09, 2013/14, 2024/25
- Men's National League Division 1 Play Off Champions (4): 2005/06, 2008/09, 2010/11, 2012/13
- Men's National Trophy Winners (5): 2006/07, 2007/08, 2008/09, 2010/11, 2013/14

=== Current roster ===
Reading Rockets 26-27 roster
Players
Coaches

Pos.	No.	Nat.	Name	Ht.
G	4	(United States)	Bouknight, Jax	6 ft 1 in (1.85 m)
G	5	(United States) (United Kingdom)	Salih, Yusef	6 ft 2 in (1.88 m)
G	6	(United Kingdom)	Holmes, Toby	6 ft 3 in (1.91 m)
G	7	(United States) (United Kingdom)	Adedigba, Ramiah	6 ft 0 in (1.83 m)
G	8	(United Kingdom)	Harrington, Ethan	6 ft 3 in (1.91 m)
F	9	(United Kingdom)	MacKinnon, Joe	6 ft 4 in (1.93 m)
F	10	(United Kingdom)	Bakary, Luca	6 ft 8 in (2.03 m)
F	11	(United States)	Curry, Jaylen	6 ft 6 in (1.98 m)
F	12	(United Kingdom)	Kivuvu, Live	6 ft 8 in (2.03 m)
F	13	(United Kingdom)	Ojo, Ethan	6 ft 5 in (1.96 m)
F	14	(United States)	Nap, Jaxon	6 ft 7 in (2.01 m)
F	15	(Canada) (United Kingdom)	Walker, Mo	6 ft 10 in (2.08 m)

Head coach

(Azerbaijan) Samit Nuruzade

Assistant coach(es)

(United Kingdom) Ben Fisher (United Kingdom) Jack Adams

Legend

- (C) Team captain
- Injured

=== Notable former players ===
Note: Flags indicate national team eligibility at FIBA-sanctioned events. Players may hold other non-FIBA nationalities not displayed.

Criteria

To appear in this section a player must have either:

- Set a club record or won an individual award while at the club
- Played at least one official international match for their national team at any time
- Played at least one official NBA match at any time.

- (United States) E.J. Harrison
- (United Kingdom) Adam Kelly
- (United States) Ted Smith
- (United States) Tyrell Smith
- (United Kingdom) David Watts
- (United States) Niko Scott
- (United States) Ryan Lohfink
- (United Kingdom) Luke Nelson
- (Wales) Matt Johnson
- (United Kingdom) Harrison Gamble
- (United Kingdom) Andy Powlesland
- (United States) Jermaine Williams
- (United Kingdom) Pem Bristol
- (United Kingdom) Danny Carter
- (United Kingdom) Damon Cooper

=== Staff ===
Former head coaches

Coach	From	To	Total Games	RS Won	RS Lost	PO Won	PO Lost	Total Win %
(United Kingdom) Richard Devereux	1997/98	1997/98	26	12	14			0.462
(United Kingdom) Dave Aldred	1998/99	1998/99	26	17	9			0.654
(United Kingdom) Dave Titmuss	1999/00	2000/01	42	31	11			0.738
(Wales) Matt Johnson	2002/03	2002/03	22	16	6			0.727
(United Kingdom) Mark Dunning	2004/05	2004/05	22	16	6			0.727
(United Kingdom) Dave Titmuss	2005/06	2008/09	95	75	9	9	2	0.884
(Serbia) Sasa Punosevac	2009/10	2009/10	6	3	3	–	–	0.500
(Wales) Matt Johnson	2009/10	2009/10	17	9	7	0	1	0.529
(Azerbaijan) Samit Nuruzade	2010/11	2012/13	75	48	20	6	1	0.720
(Spain) Manuel Pena Garces	2013/14	2017/18	134	91	33	5	5	0.716
(Republic of Ireland) Alan Keane	2018/19	2020/21	68	35	33	-	-	0.514
(United States) Dan Pearson	2021/22	2021/22	27	15	11	-	1	0.555
(Azerbaijan) Samit Nuruzade	2022/23	Present	33	21	10	1	1	0.66

=== Season-by-season records ===
Season	Division	Tier	Regular Season						Post-Season	National Cup	Trophy
Season	Division	Tier	Finish	Played	Wins	Losses	Points	Win %	Post-Season	National Cup	Trophy
Reading Rockets
1997–98	D3	4	3rd	26	12	14	24	0.462	Quarter-finals	-	-
1998–99	D2	3	4th	26	17	9	34	0.654	Quarter-finals	-	-
1999–00	D2	3	5th	24	17	7	34	0.708	Semi-finals	-	-
2000–01	D1	3	2nd	18	14	4	28	0.778	Winners, beating Oxford	-	-
2001–02	Conf.	2	7th	18	7	11	14	0.389	Quarter-finals	-	-
2002–03	Conf.	2	3rd	22	16	6	32	0.727	Runners-up	-	-
2003–04	D1	2	2nd	22	17	5	34	0.773	Semi-finals	Quarter-finals	-
2004–05	D1	2	3rd	22	16	6	32	0.727	Runners-up	Winners, beating Sheffield	-
2005–06	D1	2	2nd	26	22	4	44	0.846	Winners, beating Worthing	Runners-up	-
2006–07	D1	2	2nd	22	19	3	38	0.864	Semi-finals	Semi-finals	-
2007–08	D1	2	2nd	18	16	2	32	0.889	Runners-up	Semi-finals	-
2008–09	D1	2	1st	18	18	0	36	1.000	Winners, beating Manchester	Winners, beating Manchester	-
2009–10	D1	2	7th	22	12	10	24	0.545	Quarter-finals	Quarter-finals	-
2010–11	D1	2	3rd	18	12	6	24	0.667	Winners, beating Leeds	3rd round	-
2011–12	D1	2	7th	24	14	10	28	0.583	Quarter-finals	Semi-finals	-
2012–13	D1	2	1st	26	22	4	44	0.846	Winners, beating Worthing	Semi-finals	-
2013–14	D1	2	1st	26	22	4	44	0.846	Runners-up	Winners, beating Newham	-
2014–15	D1	2	5th	24	15	9	30	0.625	Quarter-finals	Runners-up	-
2015–16	D1	2	3rd	26	19	7	38	0.731	Runners-up	Quarter-finals	-
2016–17	D1	2	3rd	26	20	6	40	0.769	Quarter-finals	Quarter-finals	-
2017–18	D1	2	3rd	24	17	7	34	0.708	Semi-finals	Quarter-finals	-
2018–19	D1	2	6th	26	14	12	28	0.538	Quarter-finals	4th round	-
2019–20	D1	2	7th	23	14	9	28	0.609	No playoffs	Runners-up	-
2020–21	D1	2	9th	19	7	12	14	0.368	1st round	No competition	-
2021–22	D1	2	8th	26	15	11	28*	0.577	1st round	4th round	-
2022–23	D1	2	4th	26	17	9	34	0.654	Semi-final	4th round	Semi-finals
2023–24	D1	2	4th	24	16	8	32	0.667	Runners-Up	Runners-Up	Semi-Finals
2024–25	D1	2	3rd	24	17	7	34	0.708	Winners, Beating MK	Winners, Beating Hemel	Winners, Beating MK
2025–26	BCB	2	1st	26	22	4	44	0.846	Runners Up	-	QF

=== Record in BBL/SLB competitions ===
Season	Competition	Round	Opponent	Home	Away
2006–07	BBL Trophy	GS	Plymouth Raiders		
2006–07	BBL Trophy	GS	Worthing Thunder		
2006–07	BBL Trophy	GS	Guildford Heat		
2009–10	BBL Trophy	R1	Newcastle Eagles	L 60–102	
2012–13	BBL Trophy	R1	Surrey Heat	L 68–86	
2013–14	BBL Trophy	R1	Sheffield Sharks	L 73–85	
2014–15	BBL Trophy	R1	Newcastle Eagles	L 90–112	
2015–16	BBL Trophy	R1	Surrey Scorchers	L 72–82	
2016–17	BBL Trophy	R1	Bristol Flyers	L 74–85	
2024–25	SLB Cup	R1	Sheffield Sharks	L 72–84	

== Women ==
=== Honours ===
- Women's National League Division 2 Champions (1): 2013/14
- Women's National League Division 2 South West Champions (1): 2015/16 1
- Women's National League Division 1 finalist (1): 2019/2020/
- Women's National cup finalist (2): 2019/2020- 2022/2023

=== Current roster ===
Reading Rockets 24-25 roster
Players
Coaches

Pos.	No.	Nat.	Name	Ht.
G	4	(United Kingdom)	Thompson, Amba	5 ft 9 in (1.75 m)
G	5	(United Kingdom)	Adelekan, Adeyosola Ayomide Taiwo	5 ft 6 in (1.68 m)
G	6	(United Kingdom)	Thompson, Mia	5 ft 8 in (1.73 m)
G	7	(Estonia)	Karpova, Kristina (C)	5 ft 7 in (1.70 m)
F	8	(United Kingdom)	Jarju, Saffie	5 ft 10 in (1.78 m)
G	9	(United Kingdom)	Guerra Rainford, Alicia	5 ft 9 in (1.75 m)
F	10	(United Kingdom)	Day, Millie	5 ft 10 in (1.78 m)
F	11	(Ireland)	Malone, Alannah	5 ft 10 in (1.78 m)
G	12	(United Kingdom)	Brydson, Sancia	5 ft 6 in (1.68 m)
F	13	(Sweden)	Harrysson, Wilma	5 ft 8 in (1.73 m)
F	14	(United Kingdom)	Blackburn, Jade	6 ft 0 in (1.83 m)
G	15	(Spain)	Adegoke, Tracy	5 ft 8 in (1.73 m)
G	16	(United Kingdom)	Dhillon, Tania	5 ft 3 in (1.60 m)

Head coach

(Spain) Joan Portero Luque

Assistant coach(es)

(United Kingdom) Philip Hayfield

Legend

- (C) Team captain
- Injured

=== Notable former players ===
Note: Flags indicate national team eligibility at FIBA-sanctioned events. Players may hold other non-FIBA nationalities not displayed.

Criteria

To appear in this section a player must have either:

- Set a club record or won an individual award while at the club
- Played at least one official international match for their national team at any time
- Played at least one official NBA match at any time.

- (United States) Cat Lutz-Sadler
- (United Kingdom) Steph Johnson
- (Germany) Maike Delow
- (Spain) Carmen Segura Moreno
- (Spain) Sitota Gines Espinosa
- (United Kingdom) Jessica (Jessie) Ford
- (Spain) Noa Sanchez Marques
- (Spain) Anabel Latorre
- (Spain) Saioa San Francisco

=== Staff ===
Former head coaches

Coach	From	To	Total Games	RS Won	RS Lost	PO Won	PO Lost	Total Win %
(United Kingdom) Josh Thorne	2010/11	2015/16	86	65	15		-	0.755
(Germany) Patrick Fasbender	2016/17	2016/2017	20	6	14	-	-	0.3
(Spain) David Sanchez de la Torre	2017/18	2019/2020	40	22	18	-	-	0.55
(Spain) Joan Luque Portero	2019/20	Present	84	41	43	-	-	0.476

=== Season-by-season records ===
Season	Division	Position	Played	Won	Lost	Points	Play-offs	National Trophy	National Cup
Reading Rockets Senior Women
2024–2025	D1	12th	22	2	20	4	-	-	
2023–2024	D1	6th	21	11	10	22	-	-	
2022–2023	D1	4th	16	11	5	22	Semifinal	-	Final
2021–2022	D1	11th	22	4	18	8	-	-	1st round
2020–2021	D1	6th	18	9	9	18	-	-	-
2019–2020	D1	3rd	15	11	4	25	-	-	Semi-finals
2018–2019	D1	5th	18	9	9	18	Quarter-finals	-	Runners-up
2017–2018	D1	5th	22	13	9	26	-	-	Quarter-finals
2016–2017	D1	8th	20	6	14	12	Quarter-finals		Quarter-finals
2015–2016	D2 SW	1st	16	15	1	28	Runners-up		Runners-up
2014–2015	D2 MSW	3rd	14	11	3	22	Quarter-finals	Semi-finals	2nd round
2013–2014	D2 MSE	1st	14	13	1	26	Semi-finals	Semi-finals	2nd round
2012–2013	D2 MSE	2nd	16	12	4	24	Quarter-finals	Quarter-finals	2nd round
2011–2012	D2 MSW	2nd	12	9	3	18	Quarter-finals	Semi-finals	1st round
2010–2011	D2 MSW	5th	14	5	9	10	DNQ	1st round	1st round
2009–2010									
2008–2009									
2007–2008									
2006–2007	D2 S	6th	20	9	11	18			
2005–2006	D2 S	2nd	21	14	7	28			

- DNQ denotes Did not qualify.

== NBL Conference Men ==
=== Season-by-season records ===
Season	Division	Position	Played	Won	Lost	Points
Reading Rockets Senior Women
2024–2025	NBL Conference Pool IV	2nd	14	11	3	22

=== Current roster ===
Reading Rockets 24-25 roster
Players
Coaches

Pos.	No.	Nat.	Name	Ht.
G	4	(United Kingdom)	Maitland, Amari	6 ft 1 in (1.85 m)
G	5	(United Kingdom)	Harrington, Ethan	6 ft 4 in (1.93 m)
F	6	(United Kingdom)	Carter, Tristan (C)	6 ft 5 in (1.96 m)
G	8	(United Kingdom)	Coxon, Adam	6 ft 3 in (1.91 m)
G	9	(United Kingdom)	Round, Ethan	6 ft 0 in (1.83 m)
C	11	(United Kingdom)	Tustin, Freddie	6 ft 9 in (2.06 m)
F	14	(United Kingdom)	Mackinnon, Joe	6 ft 3 in (1.91 m)
C	15	(United Kingdom)	Clarke, George	6 ft 8 in (2.03 m)
F	16	(United Kingdom)	Obediah, David	6 ft 5 in (1.96 m)

Head coach

(United Kingdom) Danny Carter

Assistant coach(es)

(United Kingdom) Liam Hardiman

Legend

- (C) Team captain
- Injured

== See also ==
- Basketball in England
