= Hemel Storm =

- League: BCB
- Established: 2006; 20 years ago
- History: West Herts Warriors II; 2006–2008; Watford Storm; 2008–2009; Edmonton Storm; 2009–2010; Hemel Storm; 2010–present
- Arena: Hemel Leisure Centre
- Capacity: 600
- Location: Hemel Hempstead
- Team colours
- Main sponsor: Vanarama
- Head coach: (United Kingdom) Thomas Baker
- Website: Official website

Hemel Storm are a British semi-professional basketball club from Hemel Hempstead, Hertfordshire. Founded in 2006, the Storm compete in NBL Division 1, the second tier of the British basketball system, and play their home games at the Everyone Active Hemel Hempstead Sports Centre. The club had been based in several locations across Hertfordshire and north London before settling into their current, long-term home in 2010.

The club has no formal links to the Hemel Hempstead Lakers, a basketball club formerly in the town which relocated to Milton Keynes in 1998.

== History ==
Originally formed in 2006 as a feeder club for the West Hertfordshire Warriors, the club finished in third place in EBL Division Four (Midlands/South) in their inaugural season, gaining immediate promotion to Division Three (South). Early in the following season, the parent team resigned from Division One due to financial difficulties, leaving the second team to carry on the name alone. The club continued to a fourth-place finish despite the off-court upheavals.

The newly independent club moved their home venue to the Westfield Sports Centre in Watford for the 2008–09 season, the move bringing the club a new name (Watford Storm) and another third-place finish. However, problems with the Westfield venue led to the club playing in Edmonton by the end of the season, leading to another short-term move for the 2009–10 season, and a further name change to the Edmonton Storm. Finally, the club moved one final time to Hemel Hempstead ahead of the 2010–11 season, renaming themselves the Hemel Storm and bringing basketball back to the town after a 13-year absence.

After settling into their new home, the club went from strength to strength. Over the following seasons, the Storm won the Patrons Cup in 2011, following up with a second-placed finish in EBL Division Two in the 2011–12 season and successfully defending their Patrons Cup title. This gained the club promotion to EBL Division One for the 2012–13 season. Five years later the club claimed the National Cup for the first time after a 94–77 victory over Manchester Magic.

Undoubtedly their best season to date was 2022–23, becoming only the 2nd team in NBL History to win all 4 Trophies with an unbeaten record of 40–0. The National Cup was the first trophy of the season secured with an 81–102 win over Derby Trailblazers on 22 January 2023 in Manchester, followed by the KitKing Trophy success against Worthing Thunder at Surrey Sports Park on 11 March 2023, winning 99–92. The NBL Division 1 League Title was secured with a 107–77 win at Team Newcastle University on 25 March 2023 and the season wrapped up with the NBL Division 1 Playoff Final, beating Worthing Thunder in a close 69–63 victory in Manchester on 23 April 2023.

== Honours ==
National Cup

- 2018, 2023

Patrons Cup

- 2011, 2012

KitKing Trophy

- 2023

NBL Division 1 League Champions

- 2023, 2025

NBL Division 1 Playoff Champions

- 2023, 2024

== Players ==
Hemel Storm 26-27 roster
Players
Coaches

Pos.	No.	Nat.	Name	Ht.
G		(New Zealand)	McNaught, Alexander	6 ft 1 in (1.85 m)
G		(United Kingdom)	Kostadinov, Daniel	6 ft 2 in (1.88 m)
G		(United Kingdom)	Olarerin, Victor	6 ft 2 in (1.88 m)
G		(United Kingdom)	Newman, Sam	6 ft 3 in (1.91 m)
G		(Canada) (United Kingdom)	Rai, Jovan	6 ft 4 in (1.93 m)
G		(United States)	Nurse, Jabari	6 ft 4 in (1.93 m)
F		(United Kingdom)	Walker, Kai	6 ft 5 in (1.96 m)
F		(United States)	Small, Jared	6 ft 7 in (2.01 m)
F		(Guinea) (United Kingdom)	Sylla, Hakeem	6 ft 8 in (2.03 m)
F		(New Zealand) (United Kingdom)	Inger, Brayden	6 ft 8 in (2.03 m)
F		(United Kingdom)	Nsangu, Ty	6 ft 9 in (2.06 m)
F		(United Kingdom)	Nkomba, Yves	6 ft 11 in (2.11 m)

Head coach

Tom Baker (United Kingdom)

Physiotherapist(s)

Hannah Richardson

Team manager

Brian Taylor

Legend

- (C) Team captain
- Injured

=== Notable former players ===
Note: Flags indicate national team eligibility at FIBA-sanctioned events. Players may hold other non-FIBA nationalities not displayed.

Criteria

To appear in this section a player must have either:

- Set a club record or won an individual award while at the club
- Played at least one official international match for their national team at any time
- Played at least one official NBA match at any time.

== Season-by-season records ==
Season	Division	Tier	Regular Season						Post-Season	National Cup
Season	Division	Tier	Finish	Played	Wins	Losses	Points	Win %	Post-Season	National Cup
West Herts Warriors II
2006-07	D4 Mid	5	3rd	16	12	4	24	0.750	Quarter-final	Did not compete
2007-08	D3 Sou	4	4th	22	13	9	26	0.591	Quarter-final	Did not compete
Watford Storm
2008-09	D3 Sou	4	3rd	24	18	6	36	0.750	Quarter-final	3rd round
Edmonton Storm
2009-10	D2	3	4th	20	13	7	26	0.650	Semi-final	2nd round
Hemel Storm
2010-11	D2	3	5th	20	12	8	24	0.600	Quarter-final	2nd round
2011-12	D2	3	2nd	20	16	4	32	0.800	Quarter-final	Quarter-final
2012-13	D1	2	10th	26	11	15	22	0.423	Did not qualify	Quarter-final
2013-14	D1	2	3rd	26	18	8	36	0.692	Quarter-final	3rd round
2014-15	D1	2	10th	24	9	15	18	0.375	Did not qualify	3rd round
2015-16	D1	2	4th	26	18	8	36	0.692	Quarter-final	3rd round
2016-17	D1	2	8th	26	13	13	26	0.500	Quarter-final	4th round
2017-18	D1	2	7th	24	12	12	24	0.500	Runners-Up	Winners, beating Manchester
2018-19	D1	2	9th	26	11	15	22	0.423	Did not qualify	Semi-finals
2019-20	D1	2	4th	23	16	7	35	0.696	No playoffs	Quarter-finals
2020-21	D1	2	3rd	19	14	5	28	0.737	Runners-Up	No competition
2021-22	D1	2	6th	26	16	10	32	0.615	Runners-Up	Quarter-finals
2022-23	D1	2	1st	26	26	0	52	1.000	Winners	Winners, beating Derby
2023-24	D1	2	3rd	24	19	5	38	0.792	Winners	Quarter-finals
2024-25	D1	2	1st	24	19	5	38	0.792	Semi-Finals	Runners-Up

== Record in BBL competitions ==
Season	Competition	Round	Opponent	Home	Away
2020–21	BBL Trophy	R1	Cheshire Phoenix		L 77–63
2021–22	BBL Trophy	R1	Thames Valley Cavaliers		L 86–78
2024–25	SLB Cup	R1	Manchester Basketball	L 73-93	
