= Yorkshire Dragons =

Basketball team in West Yorkshire, England

- League: BCB
- Established: 2001; 25 years ago
- History: Bradford Dragons; 2001-2025; Yorkshire Dragons; 2025-present
- Arena: Calderdale College
- Location: Halifax, West Yorkshire
- Team colours
- Head coach: (United Kingdom) Michael Wilson
- Website: Official website

The Yorkshire Dragons are an English professional basketball club based in Halifax, West Yorkshire. Founded in 2001, the Dragons currently compete in British Championship Basketball, the second tier of the British basketball system.

== Club history ==
The club was established in 2001 as the Bradford Dragons, as a local under-16 club in response to growing demand from local players for an outlet to play competitive basketball. The club quickly attracted more young players, entering an under-18 team in the Bradford League for the 2002-03 season and adding an Under-21 team in 2003. 2004 saw further expansion, with under-14 and under-16 teams entering the national junior leagues for the first time.

The Dragons added senior men's basketball to their programme in 2005, entering into EBL Division Three North. The team made a steady start to life in the National League, finishing in the top six in each of their first four seasons, narrowly missing out on the playoffs on several occasions. In the 2009-10 season, the team won the first of two successive promotions, finishing the season at the top of Division Three (North) and making the post-season semi-finals. A similar record in the 2010-11 season saw the Men's team promoted to NBL Division 1, where they have remained since.

A reserve team was entered in EBL Division Four (North) for the first time in 2011, with a women's team joining EBL Division Two (North) in the following season and claiming the title at their first attempt with a 13-2 record. Despite this early success, both teams were disbanded after the 2012-13 season, although the club hopes to relaunch both teams into national competition in the future.

The club's importance to the local community was recognised in 2006 by Bradford Council, which awarded the Dragons a special commendation award for their contribution to community cohesion.

In 2025, the club rebranded to the Yorkshire Dragons.

== Players ==
Yorkshire Dragons 26-27 roster
Players
Coaches

Pos.	No.	Nat.	Name	Ht.
G		(United Kingdom)	Walton, Jack	6 ft 0 in (1.83 m)
G		(United Kingdom)	Kemp, William	6 ft 0 in (1.83 m)
G		(United Kingdom)	Wild, Greg	6 ft 1 in (1.85 m)
G		(United Kingdom)	Lycoudis, Andreas	6 ft 3 in (1.91 m)
G		(United States)	Jefferson, Jordan	6 ft 4 in (1.93 m)
G		(United Kingdom)	Bartholomew, Kaiden	6 ft 5 in (1.96 m)
G		(Canada) (United Kingdom)	Johnson, Corey	6 ft 5 in (1.96 m)
F		(United Kingdom)	Ulph, David	6 ft 6 in (1.98 m)
F		(United States)	Dudek, Jackson	6 ft 7 in (2.01 m)
F		(United Kingdom)	Dubiel, Torin	6 ft 8 in (2.03 m)

Head coach

(United Kingdom) Michael Wilson

Legend

- (C) Team captain
- Injured

== Season-by-season records ==
Season	Division	Tier	League						Playoffs	National Cup	Div. League Cup
Season	Division	Tier	Finish	Played	Wins	Losses	Points	Win %	Playoffs	National Cup	Div. League Cup
Bradford Dragons
2005-06	D3 Nor	4	5th	16	8	8	16	0.500	Did not qualify	1st round	1st round
2006-07	D3 Nor	4	5th	20	13	7	26	0.650	Did not qualify	2nd round	Semi-finals
2007-08	D3 Nor	4	3rd	20	14	6	28	0.700	Quarter-finals	3rd round	Semi-finals
2008-09	D3 Nor	4	5th	22	14	8	28	0.636	Did not qualify	3rd round	Quarter-finals
2009-10	D3 Nor	4	1st	22	21	1	42	0.955	Semi-finals	1st round	Runners Up
2010-11	D2	3	1st	20	17	3	34	0.850	Semi-finals	Quarter-finals	Semi-finals
2011-12	D1	2	6th	24	15	9	30	0.625	Quarter-finals	Quarter-finals	Quarter-finals
2012-13	D1	2	12th	26	10	16	20	0.385	Did not qualify	2nd round	Quarter-finals
2013-14	D1	2	4th	26	17	9	34	0.654	Semi-finals	2nd round	1st round
2014-15	D1	2	8th	24	10	14	20	0.417	Quarter-finals	Quarter-finals	Semi-finals
2015-16	D1	2	12th	26	6	20	12	0.231	Did not qualify	2nd round	Semi-finals
2016-17	D1	2	7th	26	14	12	28	0.538	Quarter-finals	Quarter-finals	Pool Stage
2017-18	D1	2	6th	24	13	11	26	0.542	Quarter-finals	Quarter-finals	Pool Stage
2018-19	D1	2	11th	26	11	15	22	0.423	Did not qualify	4th round	Pool Stage
2019-20	D1	2	8th	23	12	11	27	0.522	No competition	4th round	
2020-21	D1	2	11th	19	7	12	14	0.368	Quarter-finals	No competition	
2021-22	D1	2	9th	26	10	16	20	0.385	Did not qualify	4th round	
2022-23	D1	2	7th	26	13	13	26	0.500	Quarter-finals	4th round	
2023-24	D1	2	7th	24	11	13	22	0.458	Quarter-finals		
2024-25	D1	2	12th	24	7	17	14	0.292	Did Not Qualify		
