= Derby Trailblazers =

- League: BCB
- Established: 2000; 26 years ago
- History: Derby Trailblazers; 2000-present
- Arena: Noel-Baker Hall
- Capacity: 500
- Location: Derby, Derbyshire
- Team colours
- Head coach: (United Kingdom) Kyle Henderson
- Website: Official website

The Derby Trailblazers are an English semi-professional basketball club based in Derby, Derbyshire. The club was founded in 2000 as a feeder club for the now-defunct Derby Storm, and wear the same blue and white colours as their predecessor. The Trailblazers currently compete in NBL Division 1, the second tier of the British basketball system.

== History ==
The Trailblazers were founded in 2000 to give local players access to competitive women's and junior basketball teams after the city's professional outfit, Derby Storm, ended their equivalent programmes to focus on their professional team, which was then competing in the British Basketball League. After the Storm withdrew in 2002, the Trailblazers added men's basketball to their offering, and started to gradually work their way up the English Basketball League. Only a few years after entering the National League, the Trailblazers were crowned NBL Division Two champions in 2007, and were promoted to Division One for the 2007-08 season.

The team were successful in the second tier of British basketball, with the Trailblazers crowned Division One champions in 2010, and winning the National Trophy in 2012, beating Bristol Academy Flyers 87-60 in the final. This success was hard to sustain though, with the team winning only six league games in the 2012-13 season, and suffering relegation back to Division Two as a result. The Trailblazers won promotion back to Division One at the first attempt as Division Two champions with a game to spare.

== Honours ==
Division 1 League Champions (1): 2009-10, 2023-24
Division 2 League Champions (2): 2006-07, 2013-14
Division 2 Playoff Champions (1): 2013-14
National Trophy Champions (1): 2011-12
Division 3 Playoff Champions (1): 2004-05
Division 3 North League Champions (1): 2004-05

== Men's team ==
=== Current roster ===
Derby Trailblazers 26-27 roster
Players
Coaches

Pos.	No.	Nat.	Name	Ht.
G		(United States) (United Kingdom)	Glasgow Jr., Rodney	5 ft 11 in (1.80 m)
G		(United Kingdom)	Washington, Conner	6 ft 0 in (1.83 m)
G		(United Kingdom)	Brown, Charlie	6 ft 3 in (1.91 m)
G		(United Kingdom)	Burr, Casey	6 ft 4 in (1.93 m)
G		(United Kingdom)	Walshe, Evan	6 ft 4 in (1.93 m)
G		(United Kingdom)	Pathmarajah, Jai	6 ft 4 in (1.93 m)
F		(United States)	Smith, Malcolm	6 ft 5 in (1.96 m)
F		(United States)	Gilbert, Kendrick	6 ft 5 in (1.96 m)
F		(United Kingdom)	May-Thompson, Raheem	6 ft 6 in (1.98 m)
F		(United Kingdom)	Marsden, Rob	6 ft 7 in (2.01 m)

Head coach

(United Kingdom) Kyle Henderson

Assistant coach(es)

(United Kingdom) Jake Chapman

Legend

- (C) Team captain
- Injured

== Notable former players ==
Note: Flags indicate national team eligibility at FIBA-sanctioned events. Players may hold other non-FIBA nationalities not displayed.

Criteria

To appear in this section a player must have either:

- Set a club record or won an individual award while at the club
- Played at least one official international match for their national team at any time
- Played at least one official NBA match at any time.

- (United Kingdom) David Attewell

== Season-by-season records ==
Season	Division	Tier	Regular Season					Post-Season	National Cup	Div. League Cup
Season	Division	Tier	Finish	Played	Wins	Losses	Points	Post-Season	National Cup	Div. League Cup
Derby Trailblazers
2002-03	D2 Nor	4	6th	18	7	11	14	Did not qualify		Did not compete
2003-04	D3 Nor	4	3rd	22	14	8	28	Semi-final	1st round	2nd round
2004-05	D3 Nor	4	1st	16	14	2	28	Winners		Did not compete
2005-06	D2	3	4th	22	11	11	22	Semi-final		Semi-final
2006-07	D2	3	1st	22	19	3	38	Semi-final		Did not compete
2007-08	D1	2	6th	18	8	10	16	Semi-final	1st round	1st round
2008-09	D1	2	8th	18	5	13	10	Quarter-final	Quarter-final	1st round
2009-10	D1	2	1st	22	17	5	34	Runner-up	Semi-final	Semi-final
2010-11	D1	2	8th	18	6	12	12	Quarter-final	Semi-final	Quarter-final
2011-12	D1	2	3rd	24	16	8	32	Runner-up	Quarter-final	Winners
2012-13	D1	2	13th	26	6	20	12	Did not qualify	Quarter-final	Quarter-final
2013-14	D2	3	1st	20	17	3	34	Winners	Quarter-final	Semi-final
2014-15	D1	2	2nd	24	17	7	34	Semi-final	Quarter-final	Semi-final
2015-16	D1	2	2nd	26	19	7	38	Semi-final	Semi-final	Pool stage
2016-17	D1	2	4th	26	16	10	32	Quarter-final	Semi-final	Pool stage
2017-18	D1	2	12th	24	6	18	12	Did not qualify	4th round	Pool stage
2018-19	D1	2	5th	26	15	11	30	Quarter-final	3rd round	Pool stage
2019-20	D1	2	3rd	23	16	7	35	No playoffs	Quarter-finals	
2020-21	D1	2	4th	19	14	5	28	Quarter-finals	No competition	
2021-22	D1	2	3rd	26	19	7	38	Quarter-finals	Quarter-finals	
2022-23	D1	2	3rd	26	19	7	38	Semi-finals	Runners-Up	
2023-24	D1	2	1st	24	20	4	40	Semi-finals		
2024-25	D1	2	2nd	24	17	7	34	Semi-finals	Semi-finals	

== Record in BBL competitions ==
Season	Competition	Round	Opponent	Home	Away
2015–16	BBL Trophy	R1	Sheffield Sharks	L 67-84	
2016–17	BBL Trophy	R1	Newcastle Eagles	L 67-100	
2020–21	BBL Trophy	R1	Solent Kestrels	L 73-101	

== Honours ==
Division 1 League Champions (1): 2009-10
Division 2 League Champions (2): 2006-07, 2013-14
Division 2 Playoff Champions (1): 2013-14
National Trophy Champions (1): 2011-12
Division 3 Playoff Champions (1): 2004-05
Division 3 North League Champions (1): 2004-05

== See also ==
- Derby Storm
