= Team Newcastle Knights B.C. =

Newcastle Knights
- League: BCB
- Arena: Newcastle University
- Location: Newcastle upon Tyne, England
- Team colours
- Head coach: (United Kingdom) Mark Elderkin
- Website: Official website

Newcastle Knights are a basketball team based in the city of Newcastle upon Tyne, England. The Knights compete in BCB, the second tier of the British basketball system, which they were promoted to in 2020. The NBL side, having entered the league in 2014, is primarily based on the Newcastle University team that competes in the British Universities and Colleges Sport league, with the addition of other professional players based in the north east. The team's head coach is Mark Elderkin, who assists the coaching team of the Newcastle Eagles, with whom the Knights have a player development pathway.

== Current roster ==
Newcastle University Knights 26-27 roster
Players
Coaches

Pos.	No.	Nat.	Name	Ht.
G		(Canada) (United Kingdom)	Shirley, Jalen	6 ft 1 in (1.85 m)
G		(United States)	House, Luke	6 ft 4 in (1.93 m)
G		(United Kingdom)	Riley, Theo	6 ft 4 in (1.93 m)
G		(United Kingdom)	Lukosevicius, Adam	6 ft 4 in (1.93 m)
G		(United States)	McGinnis, A.J.	6 ft 4 in (1.93 m)
G		(United Kingdom)	Rogers, Fiontan	6 ft 5 in (1.96 m)
F		(Canada) (United Kingdom)	O’Hara, Cieran	6 ft 6 in (1.98 m)
F		(United Kingdom)	Abdul, Hafeez	6 ft 7 in (2.01 m)
F		(United States)	Cox, Arthur	6 ft 8 in (2.03 m)
F		(United Kingdom)	Angus, Scott	6 ft 9 in (2.06 m)

Head coach

(United Kingdom) Mark Elderkin

Legend

- (C) Team captain
- Injured

== Notable former players ==
Note: Flags indicate national team eligibility at FIBA-sanctioned events. Players may hold other non-FIBA nationalities not displayed.

Criteria

To appear in this section a player must have either:

- Set a club record or won an individual award while at the club
- Played at least one official international match for their national team at any time
- Played at least one official NBA match at any time.

- (United Kingdom) Tosan Evbuomwan
- (France) Kingsley Pinda
- (United States) Patrick Wrencher
- (Northern Ireland) Brian McCotter

== Season-by-season records ==
Season	Division	Tier	Regular Season						Post-Season	National Cup
Season	Division	Tier	Finish	Played	Wins	Losses	Points	Win %	Post-Season	National Cup
Team Newcastle Knights
2014-15	D4 Nor	5	1st	20	20	0	40	1.000	Quarter-finals	Did not compete
2015-16	D3 Nor	4	1st	20	19	1	38	0.950	Runners-Up	Did not compete
2016-17	D2	3	2nd	22	19	3	38	0.864	Semi-finals	3rd round
2017-18	D1	2	11th	24	7	17	14	0.292	Did not qualify	Quarter-finals
2018-19	D1	2	13th	26	7	19	14	0.269	Did not qualify	4th round
2019-20	D2 Nor	3	1st	18	16	2	34	0.889	No playoffs	3rd round
2020-21	D1	2	5th	19	13	6	26	0.684	Semi-finals	No competition
2021-22	D1	2	7th	26	15	11	30	0.577	Quarter-finals	Runners-Up
Newcastle University
2022-23	D1	2	9th	26	12	14	24	0.462	Did not qualify	5th round
2023-24	D1	2	5th	24	14	10	28	0.583	Quarter-finals	
Newcastle Knights
2024-25	D1	2	11th	24	8	16	16	0.333	Did Not Qualify	
2025-26	BCB	2	2nd	26	19	7	38	0.731	Champions	Group Stage
