= Worthing Thunder =

- League: BCB
- Established: 1999; 27 years ago
- History: Worthing Rebels; 1999–2000; Worthing Thunder; 2000–present
- Arena: Worthing Leisure Centre
- Capacity: 600
- Location: Worthing, Sussex
- Team colours
- Head coach: (United Kingdom) Gary Smith
- Ownership: Sara Jenner, Zaire Taylor
- Website: Official website

The Worthing Thunder are a British professional basketball, based in Worthing, West Sussex, England. They compete in the British Championship Basketball and has played their home games at the Worthing Leisure Center since their inaugural season. The team was originally founded in 1999 as the Worthing Rebels, switching to their current name in 2000.

== Franchise history ==
=== The early years ===
Basketball has been played in the town of Worthing since 1984, when Worthing Bears called the Worthing Leisure Centre home (the Thunderdome). In 1999, to build on their popularity and boost commercial revenue the Bears decided to relocate to the nearby city of Brighton, where the franchise had originally started. Disappointed local Bears fans, looking for a new team to follow, quickly snapped up the franchise of struggling Stevenage and in 1999, soon after the Bears had moved out, Worthing Thunder was born.

An excellent debut season, playing as the Worthing Rebels, saw them finish runners up in the National Basketball League Division 1, with a 21–3 record, compared to champions Teesside Mohawks' 22–2 record, as well as reaching the National Trophy final, losing 81–78 to Teesside at the Sheffield Arena in Sheffield. The following year, 2001, saw the Thunder finish again as runners-up in the renamed NBL Conference (16–5) as well as the Playoff final, both times losing out to Plymouth Raiders.

Worthing's first silverware came in 2004 in the form of the National Trophy, a competition they had finished runners up for the two years previous (2002 and 2003). The 86–72 win against the Sutton Pumas at the University of Worcester capped off a less than memorable league campaign, where the team finished 5th in the new English Basketball League Conference (15–7).

The 2004–2005 season saw mild improvement on the league standings, finishing 4th with a less favourable 13–9 record, but the Southerners did reach the National Trophy final for the fourth time in five years, losing out this time to league winners Sheffield Arrows 83–76. However it was the 2005–2006 season that would see Worthing's biggest triumph to date, crowned as EBL Division 1 winners with a 23–3 record. The Championship playoffs were beyond reach though as the Thunder succumbed to second place Reading Rockets in the showpiece final at Birmingham's National Indoor Arena, losing by 4 points 103–99.

The feats of 2005–2006 were surpassed in the following season when as well as defending their league title with a 21–1 record, Thunder reached both the National Cup and National Trophy finals, losing the former to Manchester Magic and the latter to Reading Rockets. Some element of revenge was gained at the end of the season however, when Worthing defeated Manchester Magic at Newcastle's Metro Radio Arena to claim their first ever play-off Championship title with a 102–94 victory.

On 6 February 2008, it was officially announced that the club would be exchanging hands to a new-look board of directors in a bid to step up to the elite British Basketball League, for the 2008–2009 season. This came just months after the club declined an invitation to compete in the BBL for the 2007–2008 season, a decision which angered some fans and prompted a rival bid for the area franchise from the Brighton Cougars, which eventually failed.

Thunder ended the 2007–2008 rather disappointingly compared to their usually high standards, finishing the League campaign in 3rd place behind rivals Manchester and Reading. After losing not only the National Cup Final 104–89 to Manchester, but also the National Trophy in an 84–68 demolition by Reading, the last chance of silverware was squandered as they fell at the first hurdle in the post-season Play-offs.

However, after years of entertaining the idea of returning top-flight basketball to Worthing, the club felt the time was then right and the decision was made to make the move to the British Basketball League, officially being accepted in May 2008.

=== Rebrand ===
On 5 June 2022 Thunder rebranded their logo from the old version and changed the colour scheme from orange and black to navy blue and grey.

=== Step-up to BBL ===
Though Coach Gary Smith retained the bulk of Thunder's Division One roster, players such as Dan Wardrope (Guildford Heat) and Lijah Perkins (London Capital) were brought in to give the team much needed top-flight experience. Thunder's campaign tipped-off ironically against an old foe in Plymouth Raiders, who also made the jump from the EBL several years earlier. The game ended in a disappointing 80–104 defeat for Worthing, and it wasn't until the third game, a road trip to Cheshire Jets, that Thunder grabbed their first win in the BBL with a 91–97 victory. Their season was a mixed one overall, and even though they managed to compete with the big-boys – including a 109–99 victory at home to Scottish Rocks and an 85–88 away win at Sheffield Sharks – Worthing finished one-place above bottom London with a 10–23 record.

== Home arenas ==
Worthing Leisure Centre (1999–present)
Durrington High School (2020-2021)

== Honours ==
=== League ===
- EBL Division One Winners: 2005/06 & 2006/07 2
- NBL Conference Runners Up: 2000/01 1
- NBL Division One Runners Up: 1999/00 1

=== Playoffs ===
- EBL Division One Playoff Winners: 2006/07 1
- EBL Division One Playoff Runners Up: 2005/06 1
- NBL Conference Playoff Runners Up: 2000/01 1

=== Trophy ===
- National Trophy Winners: 2003/04 1
- National Trophy Runners Up: 1999/00, 2001/02, 2002/03, 2004/05, 2006/07 & 2007/08 6

=== Cup ===
- National Cup Runners up: 2006/07, & 2007/08 2

== Players ==
Worthing Thunder 26-27 roster
Players
Coaches

Pos.	No.	Nat.	Name	Ht.
G		(United States) (United Kingdom)	Goods, Brendan	5 ft 10 in (1.78 m)
G		(United States)	Ostrowsky, Joe	6 ft 0 in (1.83 m)
G		(United Kingdom)	Price, Alfie	6 ft 2 in (1.88 m)
G		(United States)	Hernandez, Nino	6 ft 4 in (1.93 m)
G		(United States)	Hopkins, Justin	6 ft 5 in (1.96 m)
F		(United Kingdom) (Rwanda)	Shimwa, Kenny	6 ft 10 in (2.08 m)
F		(South Africa)	Craig, David	7 ft 2 in (2.18 m)

Head coach

(United Kingdom) Gary Smith

Legend

- (C) Team captain
- Injured

=== Notable former players ===
Note: Flags indicate national team eligibility at FIBA-sanctioned events. Players may hold other non-FIBA nationalities not displayed.

Criteria

To appear in this section a player must have either:

- Set a club record or won an individual award while at the club
- Played at least one official international match for their national team at any time
- Played at least one official NBA match at any time.

- (United Kingdom) Cameron Hildreth
- (United States) Zaire Taylor
- (United Kingdom) Daniel Hildreth
- (United Kingdom) Luke Nelson
- (Lithuania) Evaldas Zabas
- (Cayman Islands) Jorge Ebanks
- (Finland) Ville Mäkäläinen

== Season-by-season records ==
Season	Division	Tier	Regular Season					Post-Season	Nat. / BBL Cup	League Cup
Season	Division	Tier	Finish	Played	Wins	Losses	Points	Post-Season	Nat. / BBL Cup	League Cup
Worthing Rebels
1999-00	NBL D1	2	2nd	26	21	5	42	Quarter-finals		Runners Up
Worthing Thunder
2000-01	NBL Conf	2	2nd	21	16	5	32	Runners Up	1st round	Semi-final
2001-02	NBL Conf	2	6th	18	9	9	18	Quarter-final	1st round	Runners Up
2002-03	NBL Conf	2	4th	22	15	7	30	Quarter-final		Runners Up
2003-04	EBL D1	2	5th	22	15	7	30	Semi-final	Quarter-final	Winners
2004-05	EBL D1	2	5th	22	13	9	26	Quarter-final	Semi-final	Runners Up
2005-06	EBL D1	2	1st	26	23	3	46	Runners Up	Quarter-final	2nd round
2006-07	EBL D1	2	1st	22	21	1	42	Winners	Runners Up	Runners Up
2007-08	EBL D1	2	3rd	18	14	4	28	Quarter-final	Runners Up	Runners Up
2008-09	BBL	1	11th	33	10	23	20	Did not qualify	1st round	1st round
2009-10	BBL	1	8th	36	18	18	36	Quarter-final	1st round	Quarter-final
2010-11	BBL	1	11th	33	5	28	10	Did not qualify	1st round	1st round
2011-12	EBL D1	2	4th	24	16	8	32	Quarter-final	Quarter-final	3rd round
2012-13	EBL D1	2	7th	26	13	13	26	Runners Up	Semi-final	1st round
2013-14	NBL D1	2	10th	26	11	15	22	Did not qualify	2nd round	
2014-15	NBL D1	2	7th	24	11	13	22	Quarter-finals	Semi-finals	
2015-16	NBL D1	2	10th	26	10	16	20	Did not qualify	Runners Up	Quarter-finals
2016-17	NBL D1	2	12th	26	7	19	14	Did not qualify	4th round	Semi-finals
2017-18	NBL D1	2	4th	24	16	8	32	Winners	3rd round	Pool Stage
2018-19	NBL D1	2	2nd	26	22	4	44	Runners Up	Quarter-finals	Winners
2019-20	NBL D1	2	5th	22	15	7	34	No competition	4th round	
2020-21	NBL D1	2	7th	19	9	10	18	Semi-finals	No competition	
2021-22	NBL D1	2	5th	26	17	9	34	Quarter-finals	Quarter-finals	
Worthing Thunder
2022-23	NBL D1	2	2nd	26	22	4	44	Runners-Up	Semi-finals	
2023-24	NBL D1	2	11th	24	7	17	14	Did not qualify		

Notes:

- From 2000 to 2003, the NBL Conference operated as the second-tier league, ahead of Division One.
- From 2005 onwards, Thunder have regularly participated as an EBL representative in the BBL Trophy, alongside the National Trophy.
- From 2008 to 2011 Worthing competed in the British Basketball League, the country's top-tier league.

== Junior team ==
Worthing Thunder Junior teams have produced many NCAA Division 1 basketball players including Luke Nelson, Cameron Hildreth, Hosana Kitenege, and Blaize Sagna.
