= SLB Coach of the Month Award =

The Super League Basketball Coach of the Month Award is a monthly award of the United Kingdom's top professional basketball league, Super League Basketball. It is awarded to the league's top-performing coach throughout the duration of the month. Each month, the League selects nominees. Then the award is presented to the coach who receives the most votes, following a voting process with 40% of the votes coming from fans and 60% of the votes coming from a panel of 3.

== Panel Judges ==
Each judge's vote is worth 20%; they do not need to agree.

As of 6 October 2026, the panel is:

- Daniel Routledge (British Basketball historian/statistician and commentator)
- Drew Lasker (Former British Basketball player and commentator)
- Azania Stewart (Former Women’s British Basketball player and commentator)

== Statistics ==
Coach nationalities by national team.

=== Wins by Coach ===
	Coach	MVP Awards
1.	(United States) Rob Paternostro	3
1.	(United States) Atiba Lyons	3
2.	(United Kingdom) Marc Steutel	2
3.	(United States) Antoine Broxsie	1
3.	(United Kingdom) Ben Thomas	1
3.	(Argentina) Herman Mandole	1
3.	(Serbia) Petar Bozic	1
3.	(United Kingdom) Lloyd Gardner	1
3.	(United States) Matthew Otten	1
3.	(Lithuania) Tautvydas Sabonis	1

=== Wins by Team ===
	Club	MVP Awards
1.	Leicester Riders	3
1.	Sheffield Sharks	3
1.	Manchester Basketball	3
3.	London Lions	2
3.	Newcastle Eagles	2
5.	Cheshire Phoenix	1
5.	Surrey 89ers	1

=== Wins by Country ===
	Country	MVP Awards
1.	United States	8
2.	United Kingdom	4
3.	Argentina	1
3.	Serbia	1
3.	Lithuania	1

== Winners ==
=== 2024–25 ===
Month	Coach	Club	Source
September/October	(United States) Rob Paternostro	Leicester Riders	
November	(United Kingdom) Marc Steutel	Newcastle Eagles	
December	(United States) Atiba Lyons	Sheffield Sharks	
January	(United States) Atiba Lyons	Sheffield Sharks	
February	(Serbia) Petar Bozic	London Lions	
March	(Argentina) Herman Mandole	Manchester Basketball	
April	(United States) Rob Paternostro	Leicester Riders	

=== 2025–26 ===
Month	Coach	Club	Source
September/October	(United Kingdom) Ben Thomas	Cheshire Phoenix	
November	(United States) Atiba Lyons	Sheffield Sharks	
December	(United Kingdom) Marc Steutel	Newcastle Eagles	
January	(United Kingdom) Lloyd Gardner	Surrey 89ers	
February	(United States) Matthew Otten	Manchester Basketball	
March	(Lithuania) Tautvydas Sabonis	London Lions	
April	(United States) Rob Paternostro	Leicester Riders	

=== 2026–27 ===
Month	Coach	Club	Source
September/October	(United States) Antoine Broxsie	Manchester Basketball	
