= SLB Coach of the Year Award =

The Super League Basketball Coach of the Year Award is an annual award of the United Kingdom's top professional basketball league, Super League Basketball. It is awarded to the league's top-performing coach throughout the duration of the season. The award is presented to the player who receives the most votes, following a voting process involving the league's head coaches, captains and select members of the media.

== Winners ==
Season	Player	Team	Ref.
2024–25	(Serbia) Petar Bozic	London Lions	
2025–26	(Lithuania) Tautvydas Sabonis	London Lions	

== Statistics ==
Coach nationalities by national team.

=== Wins by Player ===
	Coach	MVP Awards
1.	(Serbia) Petar Bozic	1
1.	(Lithuania) Tautvydas Sabonis	1

=== Wins by Team ===
	Coach	MVP Awards
1.	London Lions	2

=== Wins by Country ===
	Player	MVP Awards
1.	Lithuania	1
1.	Serbia	1
