= SLB Defensive Player of the Year Award =

British basketball award

The Super League Basketball Defensive Player of the Year Award is an annual award of the United Kingdom's top professional basketball league, Super League Basketball. It is awarded to the league's top-performing defensive player throughout the duration of the season. The award is presented to the player who receives the most votes, following a voting process involving the league's head coaches, captains and select members of the media.

== Winners ==
Season	Player	Team	Ref.
2024–25	(United States) Charles Thompson	Leicester Riders	
2025–26	(United Kingdom) Tarik Phillip	London Lions	

== Statistics ==
Player nationalities by national team.

=== Wins by Player ===
	Player	MVP Awards
1.	(United States) Charles Thompson	1
1.	(United Kingdom) Tarik Phillip	1

=== Wins by Team ===
	Player	MVP Awards
1.	Leicester Riders	1
1.	London Lions	1

=== Wins by Country ===
	Player	MVP Awards
1.	United Kingdom	1
1.	United States	1
