= SLB Most Improved Player of the Year Award =

British basketball award

The Super League Basketball Most Improved Player of the Year Award is an annual award of the United Kingdom's top professional basketball league, Super League Basketball. It is awarded to the league's Most Improved Player throughout the duration of the season. The award is presented to the player who receives the most votes, following a voting process involving the league's head coaches, captains and select members of the media.

== Winners ==
Season	Player	Team	Ref.
2024–25	(United Kingdom) Nedas Cholevinskas	Surrey 89ers	
2025–26	(United States) Owen McCormack	Bristol Flyers	

== Statistics ==
Player nationalities by national team.

=== Wins by Player ===
	Player	MVP Awards
1.	(United Kingdom) Nedas Cholevinskas	1
1.	(United States) Owen McCormack	1

=== Wins by Team ===
	Player	MVP Awards
1.	Bristol Flyers	1
1.	Surrey 89ers	1

=== Wins by Country ===
	Player	MVP Awards
1.	United Kingdom	1
1.	United States	1
