= SLB Community Champion of the Year =

SLB Community Champion of the Year Award

The Super League Basketball Community Champion of the Year Award is an annual award of the United Kingdom's top professional basketball league, Super League Basketball. It is awarded to the player who contributes to the community away from Super League Basketball action.

== Winners ==
Season	Player	Team	Ref.
2024–25	(Canada) Nick Lewis	Manchester Basketball	
2025–26	(United Kingdom) Kyle Jimenez	Caledonia Gladiators	

== Statistics ==
Player nationalities by national team.

=== Wins by Player ===
	Player	MVP Awards
1.	(United Kingdom) Kyle Jimenez	1
1.	(Canada) Nick Lewis	1

=== Wins by Team ===
	Player	MVP Awards
1.	Caledonia Gladiators	1
1.	Manchester Basketball	1

=== Wins by Country ===
	Player	MVP Awards
1.	Canada	1
1.	United Kingdom	1
