= List of professional sports teams in the United Kingdom =

This article features a listing of all professional sports teams based in the United Kingdom, in addition to teams from other countries that compete in professional leagues featuring teams from the United Kingdom.

== Football ==
=== England ===
==== Premier League ====
Team	Location	Stadium	Capacity
Arsenal	London (Holloway)	Emirates Stadium	60,704
Aston Villa	Birmingham	Villa Park	42,918
Bournemouth	Bournemouth	Dean Court	11,307
Brentford	London (Brentford)	Brentford Community Stadium	17,250
Brighton & Hove Albion	Falmer	Falmer Stadium	31,876
Burnley	Burnley	Turf Moor	21,944
Chelsea	London (Fulham)	Stamford Bridge	40,173
Crystal Palace	London (Selhurst)	Selhurst Park	25,194
Everton	Liverpool (Vauxhall)	Everton Stadium	52,769
Fulham	London (Fulham)	Craven Cottage	29,589
Leeds United	Leeds	Elland Road	37,645
Liverpool	Liverpool (Anfield)	Anfield	61,276
Manchester City	Manchester	Etihad Stadium	52,900
Manchester United	Manchester	Old Trafford	74,197
Newcastle United	Newcastle upon Tyne	St James' Park	52,258
Nottingham Forest	West Bridgford	City Ground	30,404
Sunderland	Sunderland	Stadium of Light	49,000
Tottenham Hotspur	London (Tottenham)	Tottenham Hotspur Stadium	62,850
West Ham United	London (Stratford)	London Stadium	62,500
Wolverhampton Wanderers	Wolverhampton	Molineux Stadium	31,750

==== EFL Championship ====
Team	Location	Stadium	Capacity
Birmingham City	Birmingham (Bordesley)	St Andrew's	29,409
Blackburn Rovers	Blackburn	Ewood Park	31,367
Bristol City	Bristol	Ashton Gate	26,462
Charlton Athletic	London (Charlton)	The Valley	27,111
Coventry City	Coventry	Coventry Building Society Arena	32,609
Derby County	Derby	Pride Park	32,926
Hull City	Kingston upon Hull	MKM Stadium	25,586
Ipswich Town	Ipswich	Portman Road	30,056
Leicester City	Leicester	King Power Stadium	32,259
Middlesbrough	Middlesbrough	Riverside Stadium	34,742
Millwall	London (Bermondsey)	The Den	20,146
Norwich City	Norwich	Carrow Road	27,359
Oxford United	Oxford	Kassam Stadium	12,500
Portsmouth	Portsmouth	Fratton Park	20,899
Preston North End	Preston	Deepdale	23,408
Queens Park Rangers	London (Shepherd's Bush)	Loftus Road	18,439
Sheffield United	Sheffield (Highfield)	Bramall Lane	32,050
Sheffield Wednesday	Sheffield (Hillsborough)	Hillsborough Stadium	39,732
Southampton	Southampton	St Mary's Stadium	32,384
Stoke City	Stoke-on-Trent	bet365 Stadium	30,089
Swansea City	Swansea	Swansea.com Stadium	21,088
Watford	Watford	Vicarage Road	22,200
West Bromwich Albion	West Bromwich	The Hawthorns	26,850
Wrexham	Wrexham	Racecourse Ground	10,771

==== EFL League One ====
Team	Location	Stadium	Capacity
AFC Wimbledon	London (Wimbledon)	Plough Lane	9,215
Barnsley	Barnsley	Oakwell	23,287
Blackpool	Blackpool	Bloomfield Road	16,500
Bolton Wanderers	Horwich	Toughsheet Community Stadium	28,723
Bradford City	Bradford	Valley Parade	24,840
Burton Albion	Burton upon Trent	Pirelli Stadium	6,912
Cardiff City	Cardiff	Cardiff City Stadium	33,280
Doncaster Rovers	Doncaster	Eco-Power Stadium	15,231
Exeter City	Exeter	St. James Park	8,720
Huddersfield Town	Huddersfield	Kirklees Stadium	24,121
Leyton Orient	London (Leyton)	Brisbane Road	9,271
Lincoln City	Lincoln	Sincil Bank	10,669
Luton Town	Luton	Kenilworth Road	12,056
Mansfield Town	Mansfield	Field Mill	9,186
Northampton Town	Northampton (Sixfields)	Sixfields Stadium	8,200
Peterborough United	Peterborough	London Road Stadium	15,314
Plymouth Argyle	Plymouth	Home Park	17,900
Port Vale	Stoke-on-Trent (Burslem)	Vale Park	15,036
Reading	Reading	Madejski Stadium	24,161
Rotherham United	Rotherham	New York Stadium	12,021
Stevenage	Stevenage	Broadhall Way	7,800
Stockport County	Stockport (Edgeley)	Edgeley Park	10,852
Wigan Athletic	Wigan	Brick Community Stadium	25,138
Wycombe Wanderers	High Wycombe	Adams Park	10,137

==== EFL League Two ====
Team	Location	Stadium	Capacity
Accrington Stanley	Accrington	Crown Ground	5,450
Barnet	London (Canons Park)	The Hive Stadium	6,418
Barrow	Barrow-in-Furness	Holker Street	6,500
Bristol Rovers	Bristol (Horfield)	Memorial Stadium	9,832
Bromley	London (Bromley)	Hayes Lane	5,300
Cambridge United	Cambridge	Abbey Stadium	8,127
Cheltenham Town	Cheltenham	Whaddon Road	7,066
Chesterfield	Chesterfield	SMH Group Stadium	10,504
Colchester United	Colchester	Colchester Community Stadium	10,105
Crawley Town	Crawley	Broadfield Stadium	5,996
Crewe Alexandra	Crewe	Gresty Road	10,153
Fleetwood Town	Fleetwood	Highbury Stadium	5,327
Gillingham	Gillingham	Priestfield Stadium	11,582
Grimsby Town	Cleethorpes	Blundell Park	9,052
Harrogate Town	Harrogate	Wetherby Road	5,000
Milton Keynes Dons	Milton Keynes (Denbigh)	Stadium MK	30,500
Newport County	Newport	Rodney Parade	7,850
Notts County	Nottingham	Meadow Lane	19,841
Oldham Athletic	Oldham	Boundary Park	13,513
Salford City	Salford	Moor Lane	5,108
Shrewsbury Town	Shrewsbury	New Meadow	9,875
Swindon Town	Swindon	County Ground	15,728
Tranmere Rovers	Birkenhead (Prenton)	Prenton Park	16,789
Walsall	Walsall (Bescot)	Bescot Stadium	11,300

==== Women's Super League ====
Team	Location	Ground	Capacity
Arsenal	London (Holloway)	Emirates Stadium	60,704
Aston Villa	Birmingham	Villa Park	42,640
Brighton & Hove Albion	Crawley	Broadfield Stadium	6,134
Chelsea	London (Kingston upon Thames)	Kingsmeadow	4,850
Everton	Liverpool	Goodison Park	39,414
Leicester City	Leicester	King Power Stadium	32,312
Liverpool	St Helens	Totally Wicked Stadium	18,000
London City Lionesses	London (Bromley)	Hayes Lane	5,000
Manchester City	Manchester	Academy Stadium	7,000
Manchester United	Leigh	Leigh Sports Village	12,000
Tottenham Hotspur	London (Leyton)	Brisbane Road	9,271
West Ham United	London (Dagenham)	Victoria Road	6,078

==== Women's Super League 2 ====
Team	Location	Ground	Capacity
Birmingham City	Birmingham (Bordesley)	St Andrew's	29,902
Bristol City	Bristol (Ashton Gate)	Ashton Gate	27,000
Charlton Athletic	London (Charlton)	The Valley	27,111
Crystal Palace	London (Sutton)	Gander Green Lane	5,013
Durham	Durham	Maiden Castle	1,800 (League); 2,400 (Cup)
Ipswich Town	Colchester	Colchester Community Stadium	10,105
Newcastle United	Newcastle upon Tyne (Kingston Park)	Kingston Park Stadium	10,200
Nottingham Forest	Nottingham (West Bridgford)	The City Ground	30,404
Portsmouth	Havant	Westleigh Park	5,300
Sheffield United	Sheffield	Bramall Lane	32,050
Southampton	Southampton	St Mary's Stadium	32,384
Sunderland	Hetton-le-Hole	Eppleton CW	2,500

=== Scotland ===
==== Scottish Premiership ====
Team	Location	Stadium	Capacity
Aberdeen	Aberdeen	Pittodrie Stadium	20,866
Celtic	Glasgow	Celtic Park	60,411
Dundee	Dundee	Dens Park	11,506
Dundee United	Dundee	Tannadice Park	14,223
Falkirk	Falkirk	Falkirk Stadium	7,397
Heart of Midlothian	Edinburgh	Tynecastle Park	19,852
Hibernian	Edinburgh	Easter Road	20,421
Kilmarnock	Kilmarnock	Rugby Park	17,889
Livingston	Livingston	Almondvale Stadium	8,716
Motherwell	Motherwell	Fir Park	13,677
Rangers	Glasgow	Ibrox Stadium	50,817
St Mirren	Paisley	St Mirren Park	8,023

==== Scottish Championship ====
Team	Location	Stadium	Capacity
Airdrieonians	Airdrie	Excelsior Stadium	10,101
Arbroath	Arbroath	Gayfield Park	6,056
Ayr United	Ayr	Somerset Park	10,185
Dunfermline Athletic	Dunfermline	East End Park	11,480
Greenock Morton	Greenock	Cappielow	11,589
Partick Thistle	Glasgow	Firhill Stadium	10,102
Queen's Park	Glasgow	Ochilview Park	51,866
Raith Rovers	Kirkcaldy	Stark's Park	8,867
Ross County	Dingwall	Victoria Park	6,541
St Johnstone	Perth	McDiarmid Park	10,696

== Rugby Union ==
=== Premiership Rugby ===
Club	Location	Stadium	Capacity
Bath	Bath	The Recreation Ground	14,509
Bristol Bears	Bristol	Ashton Gate	27,000
Exeter Chiefs	Exeter	Sandy Park	13,593
Gloucester	Gloucester	Kingsholm Stadium	16,115
Harlequins	London (Twickenham)	Twickenham Stoop	14,800
Leicester Tigers	Leicester	Mattioli Woods Welford Road	25,849
Newcastle Falcons	Newcastle upon Tyne	Kingston Park	10,200
Northampton Saints	Northampton	cinch Stadium at Franklin's Gardens	15,200
Sale Sharks	Salford	AJ Bell Stadium	12,000
Saracens	London (Hendon)	StoneX Stadium	10,500

=== United Rugby Championship ===
7 of the 16 teams in the United Rugby Championship operate within the United Kingdom - 2 in Scotland, 4 in Wales, and 1 in Northern Ireland (although this team also represents three counties in Ireland. The remaining teams; 3 in Ireland, 2 in Italy and 4 in South Africa play away matches in the UK, but are based outside it.

Club	Location	Stadium	Capacity
Cardiff	Cardiff	Cardiff Arms Park	12,125
Dragons	Newport	Rodney Parade	8,700
Edinburgh	Edinburgh	Edinburgh Rugby Stadium	7,800
Glasgow Warriors	Glasgow	Scotstoun Stadium	7,351
Ospreys	Swansea	Swansea.com Stadium	20,827
Scarlets	Llanelli	Parc y Scarlets	14,870
Ulster	Belfast	Kingspan Stadium	18,196

== Rugby League ==
=== Super League ===
1 Super League team, Catalan Dragons, play all their away fixtures in the United Kingdom, but are based in France, playing their home fixtures there.

Team	Location	Stadium	Capacity
Castleford Tigers	Castleford	The Mend-A-Hose Jungle	13,000
Huddersfield Giants	Huddersfield	Accu Stadium	24,121
Hull FC	Kingston upon Hull	MKM Stadium	25,586
Hull Kingston Rovers	Kingston upon Hull	Sewell Group Craven Park	12,225
Leeds Rhinos	Leeds	Headingley Stadium	21,062
Leigh Leopards	Leigh	Leigh Sports Village	11,000
Salford Red Devils	Salford	Salford Community Stadium	12,000
St Helens	St Helens	Totally Wicked Stadium	18,000
Wakefield Trinity	Wakefield	Belle Vue	9,333
Warrington Wolves	Warrington	Halliwell Jones Stadium	15,200
Wigan Warriors	Wigan	Brick Community Stadium	25,133

== Cricket ==
=== County Championship ===
Team	Location	Stadium	Capacity
Derbyshire	Derby	County Ground	9,500
Durham	Chester-le-Street	Riverside Ground	17,000
Essex	Chelmsford	Essex County Ground	6,500
Glamorgan	Cardiff	Sophia Gardens	16,000
Gloucestershire	Bristol	Bristol County Ground	17,500
Hampshire	Eastleigh	Rose Bowl	25,000
Kent	Canterbury	St Lawrence Ground	7,000
Lancashire	Manchester (Old Trafford)	Old Trafford	26,000
Leicestershire	Leicester	Grace Road	5,500
Middlesex	London (St John's Wood)	Lord's	30,000
Northamptonshire	Northampton	County Ground	6,500
Nottinghamshire	West Bridgford	Trent Bridge	17,500
Somerset	Taunton	County Ground	8,500
Surrey	London (Kennington)	The Oval	25,500
Sussex	Hove	County Ground	6,000
Warwickshire	Birmingham	Edgbaston	25,000
Worcestershire	Worcester	New Road	5,500
Yorkshire	Leeds	Headingley	18,350

=== One-Day Cup ===
Team	Location	Stadium	Capacity
Derbyshire	Derby	County Ground	9,500
Durham	Chester-le-Street	Riverside Ground	17,000
Essex	Chelmsford	Essex County Ground	6,500
Glamorgan	Cardiff	Sophia Gardens	16,000
Gloucestershire	Bristol	Bristol County Ground	17,500
Hampshire	Eastleigh	Rose Bowl	25,000
Kent	Canterbury	St Lawrence Ground	7,000
Lancashire	Manchester (Old Trafford)	Old Trafford	26,000
Leicestershire	Leicester	Grace Road	5,500
Middlesex	London (St John's Wood)	Lord's	30,000
Northamptonshire	Northampton	County Ground	6,500
Nottinghamshire	West Bridgford	Trent Bridge	17,500
Somerset	Taunton	County Ground	8,500
Surrey	London (Kennington)	The Oval	25,500
Sussex	Hove	County Ground	6,000
Warwickshire	Birmingham	Edgbaston	25,000
Worcestershire	Worcester	New Road	5,500
Yorkshire	Leeds	Headingley	18,350

=== T20 Blast ===
Team	Location	Stadium	Capacity
Birmingham Bears	Birmingham	Edgbaston	25,000
Derbyshire Falcons	Derby	County Ground	9,500
Durham	Chester-le-Street	Riverside Ground	17,000
Essex	Chelmsford	Essex County Ground	6,500
Glamorgan	Cardiff	Sophia Gardens	16,000
Gloucestershire	Bristol	Bristol County Ground	17,500
Hampshire Hawks	Eastleigh	Rose Bowl	25,000
Kent Spitfires	Canterbury	St Lawrence Ground	7,000
Lancashire Lightning	Manchester (Old Trafford)	Old Trafford	26,000
Leicestershire Foxes	Leicester	Grace Road	5,500
Middlesex	London (St John's Wood)	Lord's	30,000
Northants Steelbacks	Northampton	County Ground	6,500
Notts Outlaws	West Bridgford	Trent Bridge	17,500
Somerset	Taunton	County Ground	8,500
Surrey	London (Kennington)	The Oval	25,500
Sussex Sharks	Hove	County Ground	6,000
Worcestershire Rapids	Worcester	New Road	5,500
Yorkshire	Leeds	Headingley	18,350

=== The Hundred ===
Eight new franchises were created for the new hundred-ball format by the England and Wales Cricket board, each featuring a men's and a women's team.

Team	Location	Stadium	Capacity
Birmingham Phoenix	Birmingham	Edgbaston	25,000
London Spirit	London (St John's Wood)	Lord's	30,000
Manchester Originals	Manchester (Old Trafford)	Old Trafford	26,000
Northern Superchargers	Leeds	Headingley	18,350
Oval Invincibles	London (Kennington)	The Oval	25,500
Southern Brave	Eastleigh	Rose Bowl	25,000
Trent Rockets	West Bridgford	Trent Bridge	17,500
Welsh Fire (Welsh: Tân Cymreig)	Cardiff	Sophia Gardens	16,000

== Basketball ==
=== Super League Basketball ===
Team	Location	Arena	Capacity
Bristol Flyers	Bristol	SGS WISE Arena	750
Cheshire Phoenix	Ellesmere Port	Cheshire Oaks Arena	1,400
Caledonia Gladiators	Glasgow	Emirates Arena	6,500
Leicester Riders	Leicester	Morningside Arena	2,400
London Lions	London (Stratford)	Copper Box Arena	6,000
Manchester Basketball	Manchester	National Basketball Centre	2,000
Newcastle Eagles	Newcastle upon Tyne	Vertu Motors Arena	3,000
Sheffield Sharks	Sheffield	Ponds Forge	1,000
Surrey 89ers	Guildford	Surrey Sports Park	1,000

== Ice Hockey ==
=== Elite Ice Hockey League ===
Team	Location	Arena	Capacity
Belfast Giants	Belfast	SSE Arena Belfast	9,000
Cardiff Devils	Cardiff	Ice Arena Wales	3,088
Coventry Blaze	Coventry	Coventry Skydome	3,000
Dundee Stars	Dundee	Dundee Ice Arena	2,300
Fife Flyers	Kirkcaldy	Fife Ice Arena	3,525
Glasgow Clan	Renfrew	Braehead Arena	4,000
Guildford Flames	Guildford	Guildford Spectrum	2,200
Manchester Storm	Altrincham	Altrincham Ice Dome	2,400
Nottingham Panthers	Nottingham	National Ice Centre	7,500
Sheffield Steelers	Sheffield	Utilita Arena Sheffield	9,300
