= Liverpool Basketball =

Liverpool Basketball of Super League Basketball

- League: SLB
- Established: 2026; 0 years ago
- History: Liverpool Basketball (2026–present)
- Arena: M&S Bank Arena
- Capacity: 8,500
- Location: Liverpool
- Team colours
- Head coach: Roy Rogers
- Ownership: Kings Dock Sports Group
- Website: Official Website

Liverpool Basketball are an English professional basketball team based in the city of Liverpool, England. The team was founded in 2026 and competes in Super League Basketball (SLB), the top flight of basketball in Great Britain. The team plays its home games at the M&S Bank Arena on the city's waterfront.

== History ==
=== Origins ===
Plans for a new professional team in Great Britain emerged in August 2025, when SLB was reported to be seeking a tenth member club with backing from an American investor. Liverpool was identified as the league's principal expansion target during August and September 2025.

The franchise was announced publicly on 5 August 2026, ahead of the 2026–27 season. The team is owned by Kings Dock Sports Group Ltd, the sports holding company founded by media executive and sports investor Jason Dolan. The launch returned top-flight men's professional basketball to Liverpool for the first time in more than a decade; the Mersey Tigers had played at the same arena from 2008 to 2010. The club's name is shared with Liverpool Basketball Club, an established NBL club in the city, though the organisations are completely separate entities.

Older team logo

The team was first announced with a simple logo that was later updated on 24 September 2026.

On 2 September 2026, Roy Rogers was announced as the first Head Coach of the newly formed team.

=== Seasons history ===
==== 2026–27 Inaugural Season ====
After a surprise signing of the reigning 2025–26 MVP and 6th man of the year Pat Robinson III, the team had their inaugural win in their 3rd game of the 2026–27 Super League Basketball season against Manchester Basketball away on 4 October 2026, with a score of 64–73. Throughout the opening of the season the team continued to be strengthened with the signings of Haydn Ling on 16 October 2026 and Tevin Olson on 23 October 2026.

The inaugural home game was planned to be the 4 October 2026 match against Manchester Basketball, but the venues were switched meaning the first Manchester Basketball home game is now 01 November 2026.

Instead, the inaugural home game was on 25 October 2026 against Newcastle Eagles and was free to attend due to the partnership with Adidas. Before the game it was announced on social media that over 8,500 free tickets were given away after over 15,000 fans applied. Also, fans who did not receive tickets for the first game were offered tickets for the following weekend. Alongside this, the first 250 people who purchased a t-shirt at the game received a free upgrade to courtside tickets. Unfortunately, Storm Boelo meant the turnout was less than anticipated, but the arena was still busy. After trailing most of the game, 30–42 at the half, and only taking a lead with 50 seconds to go, the team won this game 77–74.

== Players ==
=== Current roster ===
Note: Flags indicate national team eligibility at FIBA-sanctioned events. Players may hold other non-FIBA nationalities not displayed.

Liverpool Basketball roster
Players
Coaches

Pos.	No.	Nat.	Name	Ht.	Wt.	Age
PF	1	(United Kingdom)	Sulaiman, Tomiwa (C)	1.98 m (6 ft 6 in)	98 kg (216 lb)	25 – 21 July 2001
F	3	(United States)	Eberhart, Tyler	2.01 m (6 ft 7 in)		24 – 14 November 2001
F	4	(United Kingdom)	Tchouya, Brandon	2.01 m (6 ft 7 in)	201 kg (443 lb)	25 – 1 January 2001
SF	8	(Canada)	Lall, TJ	1.98 m (6 ft 6 in)	84 kg (185 lb)	30 – 27 October 1996
G	9	(United States)	Lindo, Damiri	1.96 m (6 ft 5 in)	98 kg (216 lb)	24 – 1 January 2002
SF	10	(United States)	Williams JR, Zay	2.10 m (6 ft 11 in)	86 kg (190 lb)	28 – 22 October 1998
G	11	(United States)	Smith, Tevin	1.95 m (6 ft 5 in)	86 kg (190 lb)	23 – 6 February 2003
G	12	(United States)	Olison, Tevin	1.93 m (6 ft 4 in)	91 kg (201 lb)	28 – 28 September 1998
SF	13	(United States)	Stampley, Nick	1.97 m (6 ft 6 in)	95 kg (209 lb)	28 – 5 August 1998
G	15	(United States)	Robinson, Patrick	1.91 m (6 ft 3 in)	88 kg (194 lb)	26 – 15 November 1999
F	32	(United Kingdom)	Okonkwo, James	2.03 m (6 ft 8 in)	109 kg (240 lb)	23 – 1 October 2003
F	34	(United States)	Maclellan, Matthew	2.06 m (6 ft 9 in)	109 kg (240 lb)	24 – 7 August 2002
C	55	(United Kingdom)	Ling, Haydn	2.21 m (7 ft 3 in)	127 kg (280 lb)	24 – 12 September 2002
F		(United States)	Hafemeister, Jesse	1.96 m (6 ft 5 in)	86 kg (190 lb)	25 – 6 May 2001
G		(United States)	Williams, Greg	1.90 m (6 ft 3 in)	93 kg (205 lb)	28 – 13 October 1998
G		(United States)	Tention, Miles	1.93 m (6 ft 4 in)	84 kg (185 lb)	27 – 21 March 1999

Head coach

- (United States) Roy Rogers

Assistant coach(es)

- (United Kingdom) Paul Cantwell
- (United States) Fortune Soloman

Legend

- (C) Team captain
- Injured

== See also ==
- Basketball in England
- Mersey Tigers
