= 2026–27 Super League Basketball season =

3rd season of Super League Basketball

2026–27 SLB season
- League: Super League Basketball
- Sport: Basketball
- Duration: 18 September 2026 – 16 May 2027
- Teams: 10
- TV partners: Great Britain: DAZN; Online: YouTube

SLB Championship

SLB Tournaments

SLB Playoffs

SLB seasons
- ← 2025–26 2027–28 →

The 2026–27 SLB season is the third season of Super League Basketball (SLB). The season features ten teams from across England and Scotland.

== Teams ==
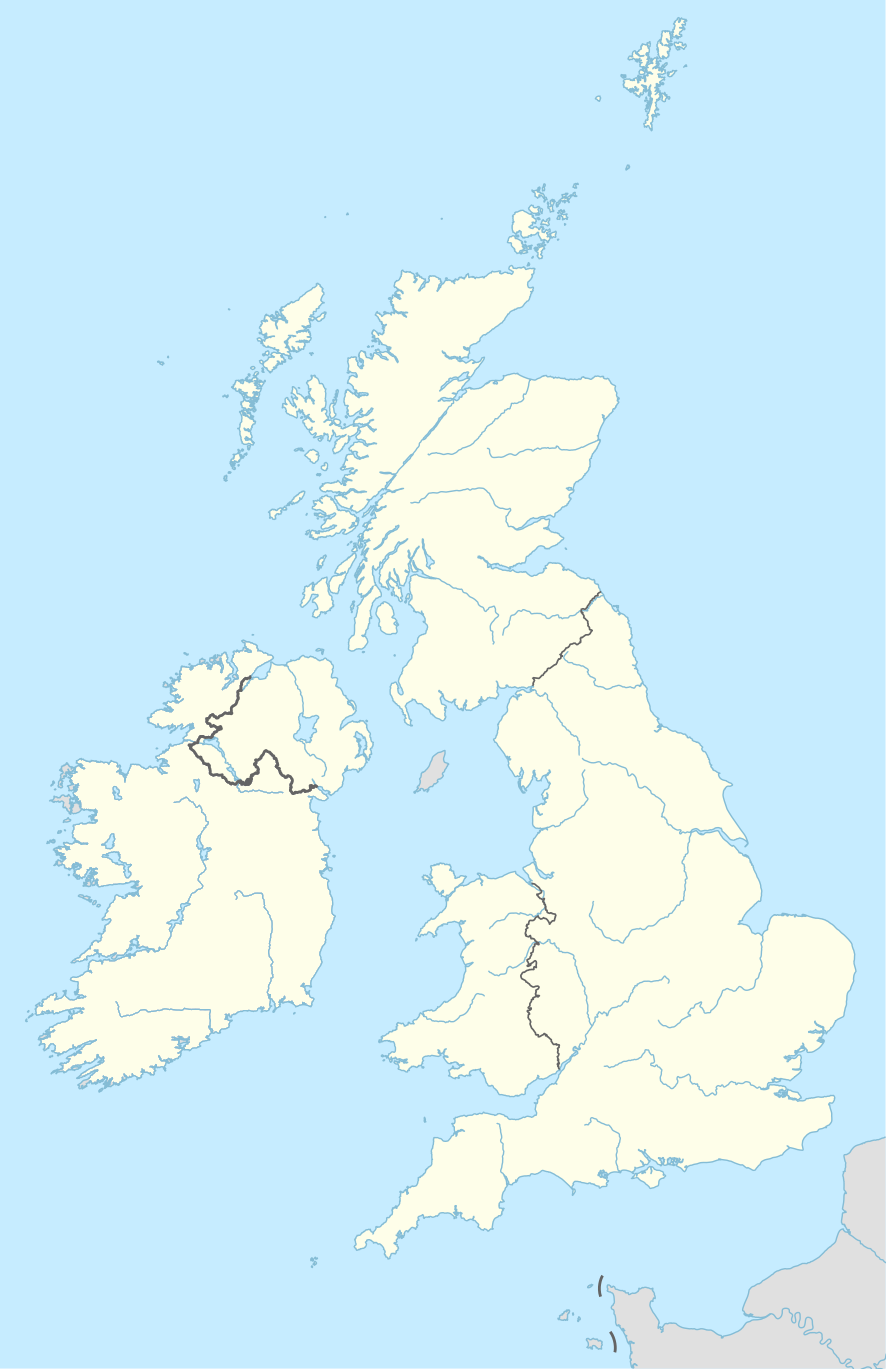
Locations of the 2026–27 SLB teams

=== Arenas and locations ===
Team	Location	Colours	Arena	Capacity	Founded
Bristol Flyers	(England) Bristol		SGS College Arena	750	2006
Caledonia Gladiators	(Scotland) East Kilbride		Playsport Arena	1,800	1998
Cheshire Phoenix	(England) Ellesmere Port		Cheshire Oaks Arena	1,400	1984
Leicester Riders	(England) Leicester		Mattioli Arena	2,400	1967
Liverpool Basketball	(England) Liverpool		M&S Arena	8,500	2026
London Lions	(England) London (Stratford)		Copper Box Arena	6,000	1977
Manchester Basketball	(England) Manchester		National Basketball Centre	2,000	2024
Newcastle Eagles	(England) Newcastle		Vertu Motors Arena	2,800	1976
Sheffield Sharks	(England) Sheffield		Canon Medical Arena	2,500	1991
Surrey 89ers	(England) Guildford		Surrey Sports Park	970	2024

== SLB Championship ==
The SLB Championship maintained the four-game series format, reintroduced for the 2024–25 season, for an expanded 36-game regular season.

Pos	Team	Pld	W	L	PF	PA	PD	Pts	Qualification
1	London Lions	12	10	2	993	938	+55	20	Semifinals
2	Newcastle Eagles	12	8	4	1016	901	+115	16	Semifinals
3	Liverpool Basketball	11	6	5	925	904	+21	12	Quarterfinals
4	Bristol Flyers	12	6	6	944	963	−19	12	Quarterfinals
5	Cheshire Phoenix	12	6	6	1123	1119	+4	12	Quarterfinals
6	Sheffield Sharks	9	5	4	752	734	+18	10	Quarterfinals
7	Manchester Basketball	12	5	7	978	1012	−34	10	
8	Caledonia Gladiators	10	4	6	845	935	−90	8	
9	Surrey 89ers	9	3	6	716	739	−23	6	
10	Leicester Riders	11	2	9	916	963	−47	4	

Updated to match(es) played on 22 November 2026. Source: superleaguebasketballm.co.uk

=== Results ===
Home \ Away	BRI	CAL	CHE	LEI	LIV	LON	MAN	NEW	SHE	SUR
Bristol Flyers	—		83–100		90–89	78–80	76–58			53–68
Bristol Flyers	—						74–78			
Caledonia Gladiators		—		80–91	78–73			92–99	87–79	
Caledonia Gladiators		—								
Cheshire Phoenix	92–101	108–92	—	108–94		83–87		61–89		91–107
Cheshire Phoenix			—							
Leicester Riders	73–78			—			87–89	80–101		
Leicester Riders				—						
Liverpool Basketball		119–93	108–117	86–77	—		85–91	77–74	81–68	
Liverpool Basketball					—					
London Lions	82–76		91–81	71–66	78–49	—		84–76	85–76	80–77
London Lions				76–97		—				
Manchester Basketball	84–86	92–94	91–105		64–73	81–96	—			79–67
Manchester Basketball			90–93				—			
Newcastle Eagles	94–68	91–67		82–74			76–81	—		82–55
Newcastle Eagles	65–81							—		
Sheffield Sharks		98–76	86–84	85–75		98–83		81–87	—	
Sheffield Sharks									—	
Surrey 89ers		85–86		107–102	74–85				76–81	—
Surrey 89ers										—

Updated to match(es) played on 22 November 2026. Source: superleaguebasketballm.co.uk
Legend: Blue = home team win; Red = away team win.

== SLB Cup ==
=== Qualifying games ===
Home Team	Date and Time	Away Team	Score	Venue
(England) Surrey 89ers	Jan 8th 2027, 7:30 PM	(England) Liverpool Basketball	0–0	TBC
(England) Newcastle Eagles	Jan 8th 2027, 7:30 PM	(Scotland) Caledonia Gladiators	0–0	Vertu Motors Arena

Source: Super League Basketball

=== Quarterfinals ===
Home Team	Date and Time	Away Team	Score	Venue
(England) Manchester Basketball	Jan 10th 2027, 3:00 PM	(England) Bristol Flyers	0–0	National Basketball Centre
(England) Sheffield Sharks	Jan 10th 2027, 4:00 PM	(England) Leicester Riders	0–0	Canon Medical Arena
(England) London Lions	Jan 10th 2027, 4:00 PM	TBC	0–0	Copper Box Arena
(England) Cheshire Phoenix	Jan 10th 2027, 5:30 PM	TBC	0–0	Cheshire Oaks Arena

Source: Super League Basketball

=== Semifinals ===
The semifinals will be played over two legs 15 January 2027, and the second legs 17 January 2027.

=== Cup Final ===
The SLB Cup final will be played on 21 March 2027 at the AO Arena, Manchester.

== Playoffs ==
The 2026 SLB Playoffs will be played on 29 April to 16 May 2026, consisting of two aggregate quarterfinal series, two aggregate semifinal series and the Playoff Final. The Playoff Final will be played at The O2 Arena, London.

=== Playoff bracket ===
Quarter Finals
4
5
3
6

Semifinals
1
2

Final

*Note: Pairings are reseeded after quarterfinals.

== British clubs in European competitions ==
Team	Competition	Progress
London Lions	EuroCup	Regular season
Manchester Basketball	Champions League	Qualifying round
Manchester Basketball	FIBA Europe Cup	Regular season
Bristol Flyers	ENBL	Regular season
