= Roy Rogers (basketball) =

American basketball player and coach (born 1973)

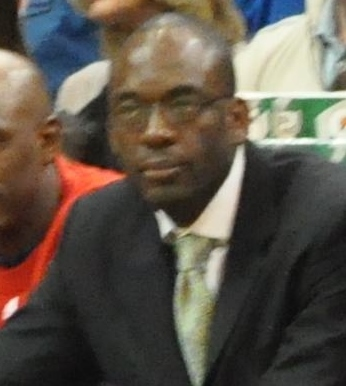
- Rogers as an assistant coach with the Detroit Pistons in 2012

Liverpool Basketball
- Title: Power forward / Coach
- League: SLB

Personal information
- Born: August 19, 1973 (age 53) Linden, Alabama, U.S.
- Listed height: 6 ft 10 in (2.08 m)
- Listed weight: 235 lb (107 kg)

Career information
- High school: Linden (Linden, Alabama)
- College: Alabama (1992–1996)
- NBA draft: 1996: 1st round, 22nd overall pick
- Drafted by: Vancouver Grizzlies
- Playing career: 1996–2004
- Position: Power forward
- Number: 52, 40, 99, 9, 25
- Coaching career: 2004–present

Career history

Playing
- 1996–1997: Vancouver Grizzlies
- 1997–1998: Boston Celtics
- 1998: Toronto Raptors
- 1999–2000: Denver Nuggets
- 2000: Memphis Houn'Dawgs
- 2000–2001: CSKA Moscow
- 2002: Aurora Basket Jesi
- 2003–2004: Noteć Inowrocław

Coaching
- 2004–2005: Huntsville Flight (assistant)
- 2005–2006: Tulsa 66ers (assistant)
- 2006–2008: Austin Toros (assistant)
- 2008–2010: New Jersey / Brooklyn Nets (assistant)
- 2010–2011: Boston Celtics (assistant)
- 2011–2012: Detroit Pistons (assistant)
- 2013–2014: Brooklyn Nets (assistant)
- 2014–2016: Washington Wizards (assistant)
- 2016–2019: Houston Rockets (assistant)
- 2019–2020: Chicago Bulls (assistant)
- 2020–2021: Los Angeles Clippers (assistant)
- 2021–2025: Portland Trail Blazers (assistant)
- 2026–present: Liverpool Basketball

Career highlights
- First-team All-SEC (1996)

Career NBA statistics
- Points: 652 (4.8 ppg)
- Rebounds: 483 (3.5 rpg)
- Blocks: 209 (1.5 bpg)
- Stats at NBA.com
- Stats at Basketball Reference

Roy Lee Rogers Jr. (born August 19, 1973) is an American professional basketball coach and former player who is currently the Head Coach of the newly formed Liverpool Basketball of Super League Basketball (SLB). He played college basketball for Alabama and was a first-round selection of the Vancouver Grizzlies in the 1996 NBA draft. Rogers played four seasons in the NBA with the Grizzlies, Boston Celtics, Toronto Raptors and Denver Nuggets. He also played in Russia, Italy and Poland.

Rogers started his NBA coaching career as an assistant with the New Jersey Nets in 2008. He has also served as an assistant coach for the Boston Celtics, Detroit Pistons, Washington Wizards, Houston Rockets, Chicago Bulls and Los Angeles Clippers.

== College career ==
Rogers played his college hoops at Alabama under coach David Hobbs.

He tied the NCAA record for blocks in a game with 14 against Georgia on Feb. 10, 1996 and is second all-time in the Crimson Tide basketball record book for career blocked shots with 266.

Rogers was named first team All-SEC for the 1995–1996 season when he averaged 13.5 points per game, 9.3 rebounds per game and 4.9 blocks per game.

== Professional career ==
Rogers, a 6' 9" power forward from the University of Alabama, was selected with the 22nd overall pick in the 1996 NBA draft by the Vancouver Grizzlies. He was traded to the Boston Celtics one season later for Tony Massenburg and a second-round draft pick. Just before the 1998 All-Star break, he was traded to the Toronto Raptors, with Dee Brown, Chauncey Billups, and John Thomas in a deal that sent Zan Tabak, Kenny Anderson, and Popeye Jones. He was then traded to the Houston Rockets, along with two first round draft picks in exchange for Kevin Willis. He was later sent to the Chicago Bulls, along with a 1999 second-round pick, in a deal for Scottie Pippen, but was waived by them after appearing in one game. He appeared in 137 NBA games between 1996 and 2000, averaging 4.8 points per game. He last played professionally in 2003 in Poland.

== Coaching career ==
Rogers began his coaching career as an assistant with the Huntsville Flight of the NBA Development League in the 2004–05 season. He joined the Tulsa 66ers for the 2005–06 season and then spent the next two seasons with the Austin Toros.

Rogers began his NBA coaching career as an assistant coach for the New Jersey Nets in 2008. On August 3, 2010, he became a scout for the Nets. Shortly after, he left for the Boston Celtics. In 2013, he joined Jason Kidd's coaching staff on the Brooklyn Nets. The next season, he joined the Washington Wizards coaching staff.

On June 1, 2016, Rogers became an assistant coach for the Houston Rockets. On May 24, 2019, Rogers and the Rockets mutually agreed to part ways following a 4–2 loss to the Golden State Warriors for the fourth time in five years. This parting of ways also came after the firing of Jeff Bzdelik, another assistant coach for Houston.

On July 3, 2019, Rogers was hired by the Chicago Bulls as an assistant coach. On October 12, 2020, the organization announced Rogers would not return to the coaching staff under newly hired head coach Billy Donovan.

On November 16, 2020, Rogers was hired as an assistant coach for the Los Angeles Clippers under head coach Tyronn Lue.

On August 2, 2021, Rogers was hired as an assistant coach by the Portland Trail Blazers of the National Basketball Association (NBA). On April 30, 2025, Rogers and the Trail Blazers parted ways.

On September 2, 2026, Rogers was announced as the first Head Coach of newly formed Liverpool Basketball of Super League Basketball (SLB) in the United Kingdom.

== NBA career statistics ==
Legend
GP	Games played	GS	Games started	MPG	Minutes per game
FG%	Field goal percentage	3P%	3-point field goal percentage	FT%	Free throw percentage
RPG	Rebounds per game	APG	Assists per game	SPG	Steals per game
BPG	Blocks per game	PPG	Points per game	**Bold**	Career high

=== Regular season ===
Year	Team	GP	GS	MPG	FG%	3P%	FT%	RPG	APG	SPG	BPG	PPG
1996–97	Vancouver	**82**	**50**	**22.5**	**.505**	**1.000**	**.574**	**4.7**	**.6**	**.3**	**2.0**	**6.6**
1997–98	Boston	9	0	4.1	.375	—	.500	.6	.1	.2	.4	.8
1997–98	Toronto	6	0	11.5	.353	—	.250	2.0	.2	.2	.7	2.2
1999–00	Denver	40	0	8.9	.398	.000	.463	2.0	.2	.0	1.0	2.2
Career		137	50	16.9	.483	.500	.532	3.5	.4	.2	1.5	4.8

== See also ==
- List of NCAA Division I men's basketball players with 13 or more blocks in a game
