= Sabonis =

- Lithuanian surname
- m.: Sabonis
- f.: (unmarried): Sabonytė
- f.: (married): Sabonienė

Sabonis is a Lithuanian surname. It is suggested that it originated from the abbreviation of the baptismal name Sebastijonas (Sebastian), although other suggestions exist about the stem sab-. Notable people with the surname include:

- Arvydas Sabonis (born 1964), Lithuanian professional basketball player
- Domantas Sabonis (born 1996), Lithuanian-American professional basketball player and son of Arvydas
- Ingrida Mikelionytė-Sabonienė (born 1970), Lithuanian actress, wife of Arvydas Sabonis
- Tautvydas Sabonis (born 1992), Lithuanian professional basketball player and coach

== See also ==
- 545564 Sabonis, minor planet
