= 2024–25 Super League Basketball (women) =

Women's basketball league in Great Britain

Super League Basketball
- Season: 2024–25
- Dates: Regular season: 19 October 2024 – 27 April 2025; Play Offs: 3–18 May 2025
- Teams: 11

Regular season
- Season MVP: (United States) Danni Williams

Finals
- Champions: B. Braun Sheffield Hatters (2nd title)
- Runners-up: Oaklands Wolves
- Finals MVP: (United Kingdom) Georgia Gayle

Statistical leaders
| Points | (Australia) Claire Jacobs | 23.2 |
| Rebounds | (United States) Danni Williams | 11.1 |
| Assists | (United States) Davida Dale | 7.3 |
| Steals | (United States) Davida Dale | 3.5 |
| Blocks | (United States) Brooke Flowers | 2.6 |

The 2024–25 Super League Basketball is the 1st season of the new top division women's basketball league in Great Britain after the previous Women's British Basketball League ceased operations. It starts in October 2024 with the first round of the regular season and ends in May 2025.

London Lions are the defending champions, after winning the last Women's British Basketball League championship.

B. Braun Sheffield Hatters won their second title after beating Oaklands Wolves in the final.

== Format ==
Each team plays each other twice. The top eight teams qualify for the play offs where every round is held as a one off game.

== Regular season ==
| Pos | Team | Pld | W | L | PF | PA | PD | Pts | Qualification |
|---|---|---|---|---|---|---|---|---|---|
| 1 | Oaklands Wolves | 20 | 18 | 2 | 1688 | 1301 | +387 | 38 | Play Offs |
| 2 | B. Braun Sheffield Hatters | 20 | 17 | 3 | 1798 | 1271 | +527 | 37 | Play Offs |
| 3 | Newcastle Eagles | 20 | 15 | 5 | 1662 | 1468 | +194 | 35 | Play Offs |
| 4 | Manchester Basketball | 20 | 13 | 7 | 1603 | 1299 | +304 | 33 | Play Offs |
| 5 | Caledonia Gladiators | 20 | 13 | 7 | 1700 | 1393 | +307 | 33 | Play Offs |
| 6 | Essex Rebels | 20 | 10 | 10 | 1579 | 1564 | +15 | 30 | Play Offs |
| 7 | Leicester Riders | 20 | 7 | 13 | 1326 | 1570 | −244 | 27 (Note: Leicester Riders 130–128 Durham Palatinates) | Play Offs |
| 8 | Durham Palatinates | 20 | 7 | 13 | 1365 | 1460 | −95 | 27 | Play Offs |
| 9 | Cardiff Met Archers | 20 | 6 | 14 | 1143 | 1594 | −451 | 26 | |
| 10 | Nottingham Wildcats | 20 | 4 | 16 | 1362 | 1629 | −267 | 24 | |
| 11 | London Lions | 20 | 0 | 20 | 1090 | 1767 | −677 | 20 | |

Source: Super League Basketball
Rules for classification: 1) Points; 2) Points difference; 3) Points scored.

== Play offs ==
Quarterfinals
1 | Oaklands Wolves | 74
8 | Durham Palatinates | 62
4 | Manchester Basketball | 77
5 | Caledonia Gladiators | 90
2 | B. Braun Sheffield Hatters | 94
7 | Leicester Riders | 42
3 | Newcastle Eagles | 90
6 | Essex Rebels | 82

Semifinals
1 | Oaklands Wolves | 69
5 | Manchester Basketball | 65
2 | B. Braun Sheffield Hatters | 102
3 | Newcastle Eagles | 68

Final
1 | Oaklands Wolves | 73
2 | B. Braun Sheffield Hatters | 83

Champions of Great Britain

B. Braun Sheffield Hatters
Second title
