= Kareem Queeley =

Kittitian-British basketball player

No. 11 – Surrey 89ers
- Position: Shooting guard
- League: SLB

Personal information
- Born: 30 March 2001 (age 25) Saint Kitts, Saint Kitts and Nevis
- Listed height: 1.93 m (6 ft 4 in)
- Listed weight: 91.4 kg (202 lb)

Career information
- Playing career: 2017–present

Career history
- 2017–2019: Real Madrid B
- 2019–2022: Burgos
- 2019–2020: →Nissan Grupo de Santiago
- 2022–2024: London Lions
- 2025–present: Surrey 89ers

Career highlights
- Champions League champion (2020)

Kareem Sherlock Queeley (born 30 March 2001) is a Kittitian-British professional basketball player for the Surrey 89ers of the Super League Basketball (SLB).

== Early life and career ==
Queeley grew up playing football and joined the Leicester Warriors basketball club at age nine. He was dominant at the youth level in England, recording multiple 90-point and 80-point games. In February 2015, he played for Real Madrid at the Minicopa Endesa, an under-14 tournament in Spain. He was named most valuable player after recording 36 points and 13 rebounds in a win over Unicaja Málaga in the title game. In September, he signed a multi-year junior contract with Real Madrid.

On 8 August 2019, Queeley signed with San Pablo Burgos of the Liga ACB. He competed for the club's reserve team, Nissan Grupo de Santiago, in the Liga EBA for much of the season. On 29 January 2020, he debuted for the senior team in a Basketball Champions League loss to Hapoel Jerusalem. In October, he was on the roster of the Burgos team that won the 2019–20 Basketball Champions League.

== National team career ==
Queeley played for England at the 2015 FIBA Europe Under-16 Championship in Kaunas, averaging 3.5 points per game in a limited role. At the 2016 FIBA U16 European Championship Division B in Sofia, he averaged 12.2 points, seven rebounds and 2.5 assists per game and leading England to fifth place. Queeley represented Great Britain at the 2018 FIBA U18 European Championship in Latvia, averaging 12.4 points, 4.7 rebounds and three assists per game. At the 2019 FIBA U20 European Championship in Tel Aviv, he averaged 12.3 points and four rebounds per game for Great Britain.

== Personal life ==
Kareem is the son of Emma Queeley and Sherlock Queeley.
