= Brooklyn College Academy =

Public school in New York City

Coordinates: 40°37′55″N 73°57′10″W

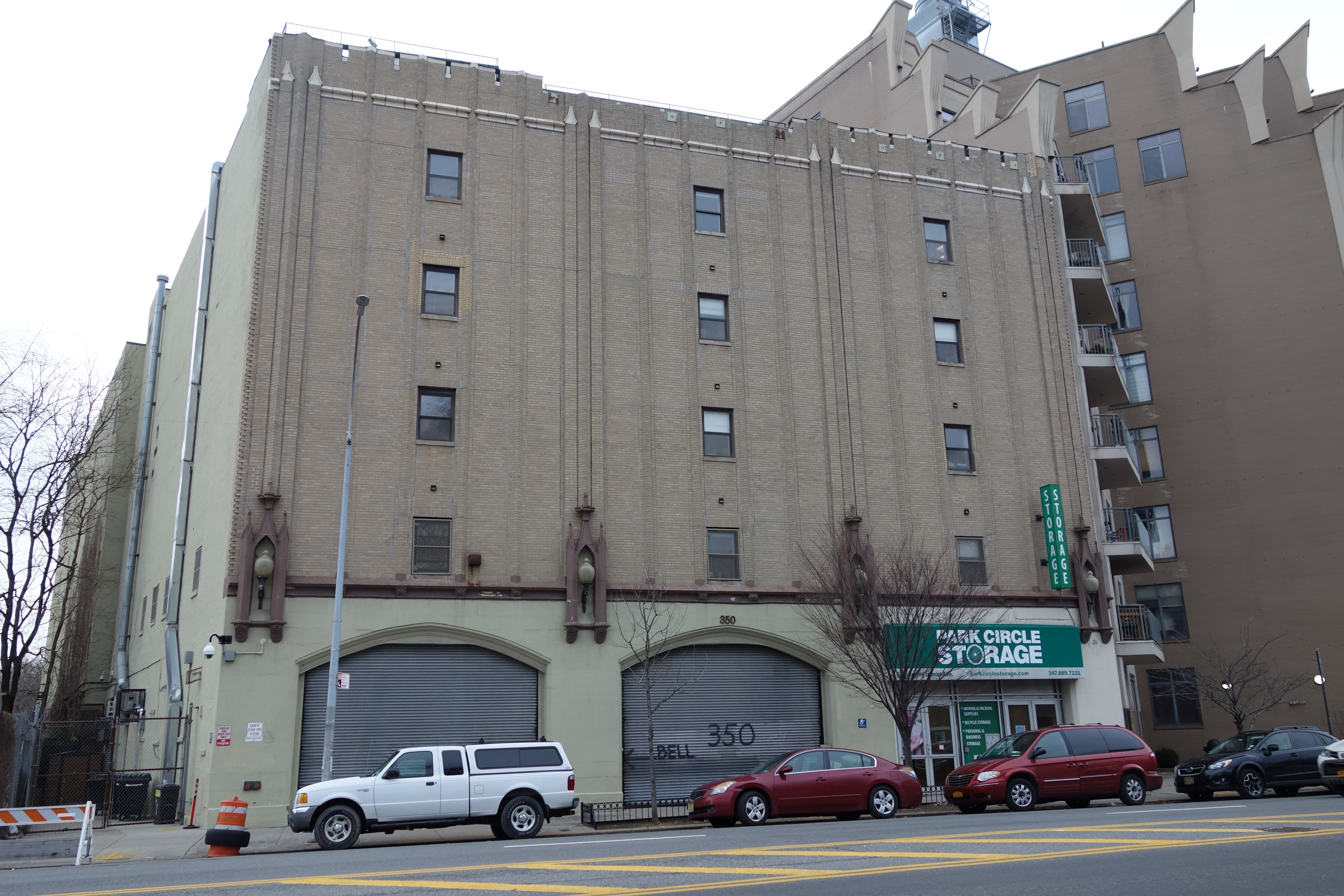
- The annex site at 350 Coney Island Avenue.
- Annex Site: 350 Coney Island Avenue; Brooklyn, New York, 11218; At Brooklyn College: 2900 Bedford Avenue; Brooklyn, New York 11210

Information
- Motto: A Community of Leaders and Learners
- Established: 1986
- Principal: Shernell Thomas
- Grades: 9-12
- Enrollment: approx. 629
- Colors: Purple and White
- Mascot: Bobcat
- Website: www.brooklyncollegeacademy.com

Brooklyn College Academy is a high school located in Brooklyn, New York City. It is part of the New York City Department of Education. A double-sited school, it serves grades 9–12.

Brooklyn College Academy was ranked second (tied with Benjamin Banneker Academy) for highest graduation rate in the borough of Brooklyn, with 97% of students graduating on time. It provides children with an early college program, which ensures that they get college credit while they are still in high school.

== History ==
Brooklyn College Academy, founded in 1986 in a partnership between the then-Board of Education and Brooklyn College, served as an alternative school—a program which was created to help older high school students that have not done well in other settings. The school no longer serves this purpose, and is a normal high school in the school system. Almost all of the school's graduates go on to attend college, two-year or four-year institutions.

The current principal is Shernell Thomas. Thomas was given the title of principal in 2019 following the retirement of previous principal, Nicholas Mazzarella, who began his career at Hostos-Lincoln High School in the Bronx and came to Brooklyn College Academy in 2005.

== Buildings and facilities ==
Brooklyn College Academy is housed at two sites. The first is a renovated warehouse, which is known as 'The Annex'. This building houses the lower school (grades 9–10). Annex is located at 350 Coney Island Avenue.

The second is William James Hall on the Brooklyn College campus. This building houses the upper school (grades 11 & 12). Brooklyn College Academy shares William James Hall with Brooklyn College students.

== Admissions ==
Students must apply to Brooklyn College Academy via the high school selection process in New York City Public Schools. But, for acceptance to Brooklyn College Academy, the students' academic record and attendance record are reviewed.

== Sports ==
In 2015, the girls Brooklyn College Academy Bobcats beat the East Harlem Pride to win the Public School Athletic League's girls B Division city championship.

== Notable alumni ==
- Foxy Brown — rap musician
- Erick Arc Elliott — rap musician with Flatbush Zombies
- Lil' Kim — rap musician and singer
- Tarik Phillip (born 1993) — British-American basketball player in the Israel Basketball Premier League
- Hunter Walker — journalist
