= Dame Adelekun =

American basketball player (born 2001)

No. 32 – CSA Steaua București
- Position: Center
- League: Liga Nationala

Personal information
- Born: March 2, 2001 (age 25) New York City, U.S.
- Listed height: 6 ft 8 in (2.03 m)
- Listed weight: 220 lb (100 kg)

Career information
- High school: Gaston Day School (Gastonia, North Carolina)
- College: Dartmouth (2019–2023); Loyola Chicago (2023–2024)

Career history
- 2024–2025: Surrey 89ers
- 2025-present: CSM Steaua Bucuresti

Demilade Ebose Adeyemi Adelekun (born March 2, 2001) is an American basketball player who played college basketball for the Dartmouth Big Green and Loyola-Chicago Ramblers.

== Early life and high school basketball ==
Dame Adelekun was born in New York City. He played at Highland Tech and Gaston Day School in Gastonia, North Carolina. His basketball career began at Highland Tech during his freshman year where he also received an academic achievement award in mathematics. At Gaston Day School, the team had three-year consecutive advancement to the state playoffs. Adelekun earned all-conference distinctions. He received all-state recognition during his senior year with averages of 20.0 points, 13.3 rebounds, and 3.4 blocks. Adelekun concluded with a total of 1,650 points.

== College career ==
Adelekun committed to playing basketball at Dartmouth in 2019. In his freshman year at Dartmouth, the season was limited to only nine games due to the COVID pandemic's cancellation. Unfortunately, the subsequent season saw the Ivy League as the first and only conference to cancel both men's and women's basketball teams due to COVID. Returning to Dartmouth as a junior after a year off from collegiate basketball, Adelekun was both in the starting lineup and came off the bench. He had an average of 7.8 points, 6.4 rebounds and averaged less than 20 minutes per game. Adelekun earned Second Team All-Ivy League honors, with an average of 13.8 points and 7.2 rebounds per game. Adelekun chose to transfer to Loyola University Chicago in the Atlantic 10 conference in March 2023.

== Professional career ==
=== Surrey 89ers (2024-2025) ===
On August 14, 2024, he signed with Surrey 89ers for the 2024-2025 to start his professional career. On January 28, 2025, he received a Hoops Agents Player of the Week award after having 26 points and 16 rebounds.

=== CSM Steaua Bucuresti (2025-present) ===
On October 13, 2025, he received a Hoops Agents Player of the Week award after having a double-double of 27 points and 11 rebounds.

== Personal life ==
Adelekun is the son of Temidayo and Patricia Adelekun and has three siblings.
