= Tarik Phillip =

British-American basketball player

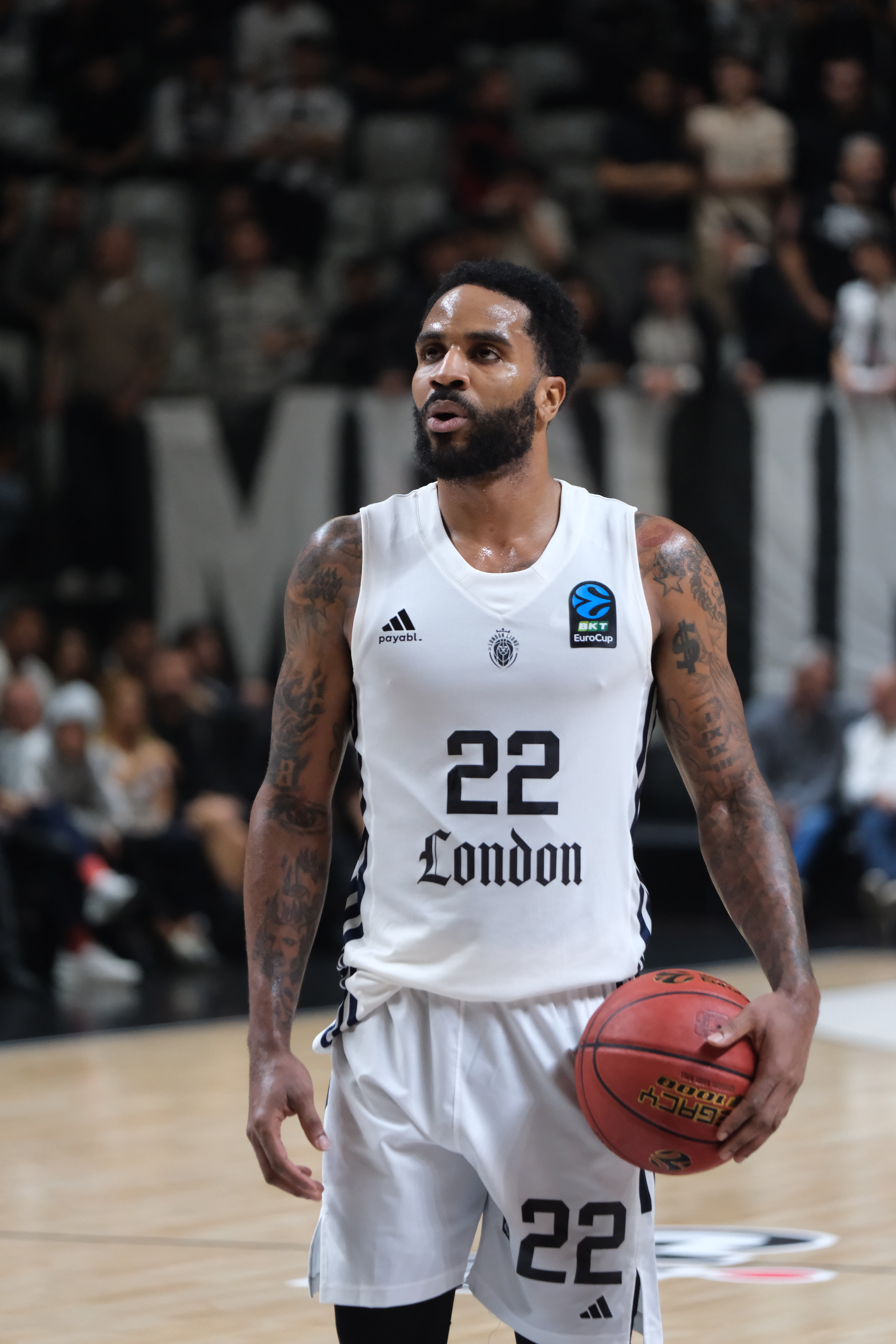
- Phillip with the London Lions in 2025

No. 22 – London Lions
- Position: Shooting guard
- League: SLB; EuroCup

Personal information
- Born: 10 August 1993 (age 33) Brooklyn, New York, U.S.
- Listed height: 6 ft 3 in (1.91 m)
- Listed weight: 192 lb (87 kg)

Career information
- High school: Christ the King (Queens, New York); Brooklyn College Academy (Brooklyn, New York); Queen City Prep (Charlotte, North Carolina)
- College: Independence CC (2013–2014); West Virginia (2014–2017)
- NBA draft: 2017: undrafted
- Playing career: 2017–present

Career history
- 2017–2018: Szolnoki Olaj KK
- 2018: CB Clavijo
- 2018–2019: Memphis Hustle
- 2019–2020: Tofaş
- 2020: Hapoel Jerusalem
- 2020–2021: Tofaş
- 2021–2022: Reyer Venezia
- 2022: San Pablo Burgos
- 2022–2024: London Lions
- 2024: Trefl Sopot
- 2024–2025: Hapoel Jerusalem
- 2025–present: London Lions

Career highlights
- Hungarian League champion (2018); Hungarian Cup champion (2018); SLB Defensive Player of the Year (2026); SLB All-Defensive Team (2026); SLB All-British Team of the Year (2026); BBL All-Defensive Team (2024); BBL All-British Team of the Year (2024); Big 12 Sixth Man Award (2017)
- Stats at NBA.com
- Stats at Basketball Reference

Tarik Phillip (born 10 August 1993) is a British-American professional basketball player for the London Lions of the Super League Basketball (SLB) and the EuroCup. He played college basketball for West Virginia.

== Early life and high school ==
Phillip was born in Brooklyn, New York, to a Grenadian father and an English mother. He began high school at Christ the King Regional High School in Middle Village, Queens, before transferring to Brooklyn College Academy before his sophomore year and helped lead the team to the Public Schools Athletic League title in his first season with the Bobcats. Phillip did not play basketball as a senior due to eligibility issues, and completed a fifth year at Queen City Prep in Charlotte, North Carolina. After averaging 26 points and seven rebounds per game, Phillip committed to play for South Carolina but was ultimately ruled academically ineligible to play.

== College career ==
=== Independence CC ===
After failing to qualify academically to play for South Carolina, Phillip began his collegiate career at Howard College in Big Spring, Texas and sat out a season before transferring to Independence Community College. Despite missing the first 14 games due to academic issues, he was named the Kansas Jayhawk Community College Conference Eastern Division Player of the Year and was named an honorable mention Junior College All-American after averaging 18.7 points, 6.7 rebounds and 4.3 assists over the final 18 games of the season.

=== West Virginia ===
Phillip spent the final three seasons of his eligibility with the Mountaineers. He averaged 4.1 points and 12.9 minutes off the bench in his first year with the team. As a junior, he established himself as a key reserve and averaged 9.3 points and 2.5 rebounds per game and shot 40.9 percent from three. As a senior, Phillip averaged 9.3 points, 3.2 assists, 3.0 rebounds, and 2.0 steals and was named the Big 12 Sixth Man of the Year.

== Professional career ==
=== Szolnoki (2017–2018) ===
Phillip signed with Szolnoki Olaj KK of the Hungarian Nemzeti Bajnokság I/A (NB I/A) on 17 August 2017. Phillip averaged 5.0 points, 2.9 rebounds, 1.2 assists, and 1.5 steals over 17 NB I/A games, and 7.8 points, 2.9 rebounds, 1.4 assists and 2.2 steals in 14 FIBA Europe Cup games, before leaving the team in February 2018.

=== Clavijo (2018) ===
After leaving Szolnoki, Phillip signed with CB Clavijo of the Spanish Second Division (LEB Oro) on 13 February 2018. He averaged 10.6 points, 2.4 rebounds, and 1.7 assists in 11 games.

=== Memphis Hustle (2018–2019) ===
Phillip was signed by the Memphis Hustle of the NBA G League following a successful tryout with the team. Phillip averaged 14.1 points, 5.0 rebounds, 4.2 assists, and 1.6 steals in 48 games (34 starts) with the Hustle. On February 24, 2019, Phillip posted 39 points in the 2nd half surpassing Pierre Jackson's 38-point half on 4 February 2014, as the NBA G League single-half record that still stood As of 3 March 2022.

=== Washington Wizards (2019) ===
The Washington Wizards announced that they had signed Phillip on 9 April 2019, the last day of the 2018–19 NBA season. He played for the Wizards' Summer League team, averaging 5.8 points, 1 rebound, 1.2 assists, and 1 steal over four games.

=== Tofaş (2019–2020) ===
Phillip was released from his contract with the Wizards in order to sign with Tofaş of the Basketbol Süper Ligi (BSL) on 13 August 2019. Phillip was named the Player of the Week for the first week of the 2019–20 EuroCup by Eurobasket.com after scoring 17 points with 10 rebounds and seven assists in an 84–71 win against Limoges CSP.

=== Hapoel Jerusalem (2020) ===
On 9 August 2020, Phillip signed with Hapoel Jerusalem of the Israeli Basketball Premier League. In his debut, he posted 21 points, 5 assists, and 3 steals in a 103–96 win against Maccabi Rishon LeZion. Phillip left the team on 18 November.

=== Return to Tofaş (2020–2021) ===
On 20 November 2020, he signed with Tofaş of the Turkish Basketbol Süper Ligi (BSL), returning to the club for second time.

=== Reyer Venezia (2021–2022) ===
On 18 July 2021, he signed with Reyer Venezia of the Italian LBA. Reyer Venezia also plays in the EuroCup.

=== San Pablo Burgos (2022) ===
On 31 January 2022, Phillip signed with San Pablo Burgos of the Liga ACB. He played 16 games for the team, averaging 7.0 points, 1.8 rebounds, 2.4 assists, and 1.1 steals per game, while shooting 81.5% from the free throw line.

=== London Lions (2022–2024) ===
On 10 August 2022, Phillip signed with the London Lions of the British Basketball League (BBL). He was named to the BBL All-Defensive Team and the All-British Team of the Year at the end of the 2023–2024 season. In 52 games, he averaged 9.0 points, 3.5 rebounds, 4.2 assists, and 1.2 steals per game.

=== Trefl Sopot (2024) ===
On 17 August 2024, he signed with Trefl Sopot in the Polish Basketball League (PLK). In eight Eurocup games, he averaged 12.6 points, 6.8 rebounds, 5.5 assists, and 2.2 steals per game.

=== Return to Hapoel Jerusalem (2024–2025) ===
On 21 November 2024, Phillip signed with Hapoel Jerusalem of the Israeli Basketball Premier League for a second stint with the team.

== International career ==
In 2017, Phillip was called up to the Great Britain men's national basketball team roster to play in the qualifiers for the 2019 FIBA Basketball World Cup. He played in six games, averaging 6.5 points, 3.5 rebounds and 1.7 assists as Britain finished 27th overall and failed to qualify. Phillip was named to Great Britain's roster for the EuroBasket 2022 qualifiers.
