= SLB Most Valuable Player Award =

British basketball award

The Super League Basketball Most Valuable Player Award is an annual award of the United Kingdom's top professional basketball league, Super League Basketball. It is awarded to the league's top-performing player throughout the duration of the season. The award is presented to the player who receives the most votes, following a voting process involving the league's head coaches, captains and select members of the media.

== Winners ==
Season	Player	Team	Ref.
2024–25	(United Kingdom) Aaryn Rai	London Lions	
2025–26	(United States) Pat Robinson III	Cheshire Phoenix	

== Statistics ==
Player nationalities by national team.

=== Wins by Player ===
	Player	MVP Awards
1.	(United Kingdom) Aaryn Rai	1
1.	(United States) Pat Robinson III	1

=== Wins by Team ===
	Player	MVP Awards
1.	London Lions	1
1.	Cheshire Phoenix	1

=== Wins by Country ===
	Player	MVP Awards
1.	United States	1
1.	United Kingdom	1
