= Petar Božić =

Serbian basketball player and coach

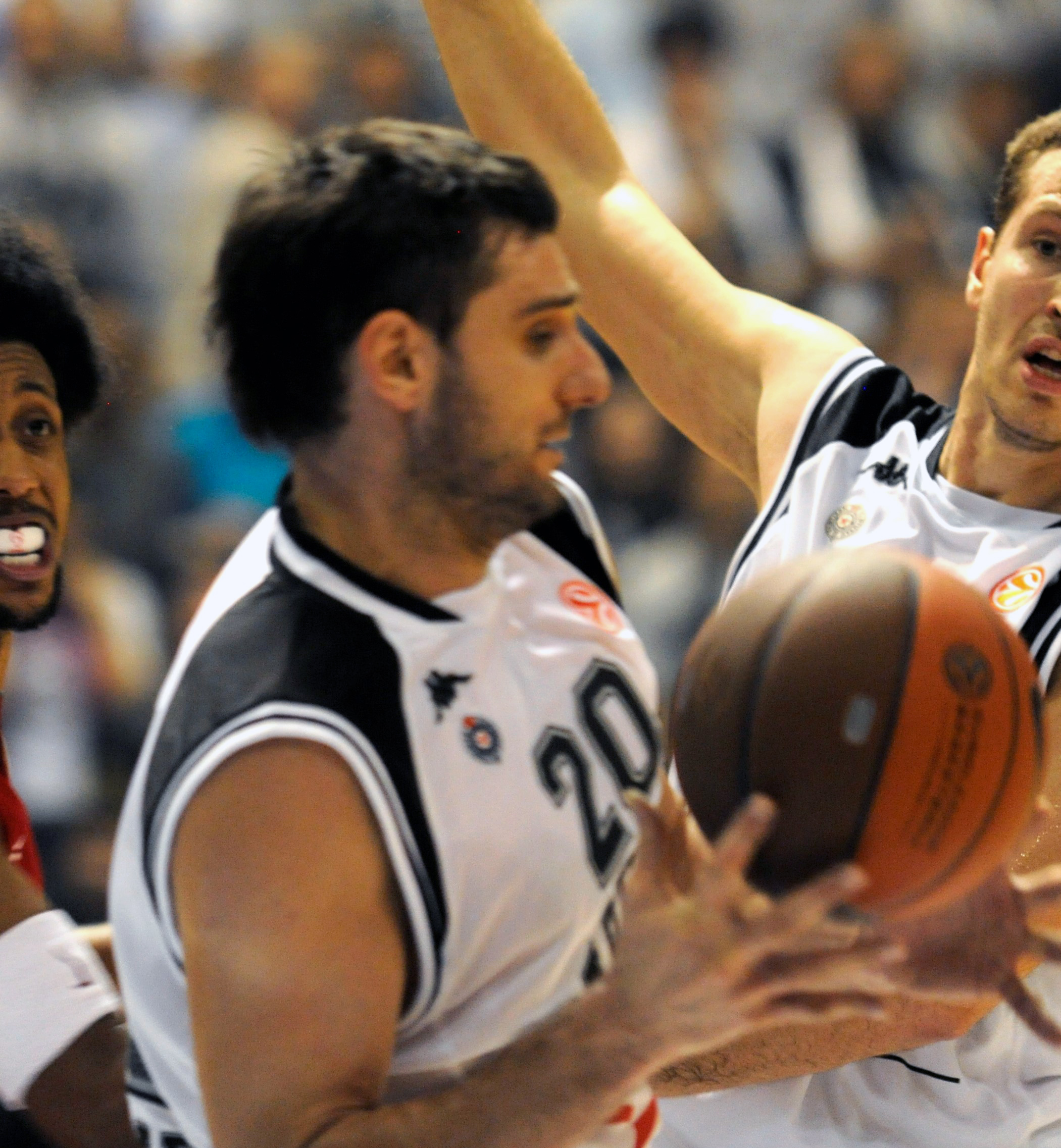
- Božić with Partizan in 2009

Shimane Susanoo Magic
- Title: Head coach
- League: B.League

Personal information
- Born: 6 December 1978 (age 47) Belgrade, SR Serbia, SFR Yugoslavia
- Listed height: 1.97 m (6 ft 6 in)
- Listed weight: 100 lb (45 kg)

Career information
- NBA draft: 2000: undrafted
- Playing career: 1997–2013
- Position: Point guard / shooting guard
- Number: 20
- Coaching career: 2013–present

Career history

Playing
- 1997–2000: Beobanka
- 2000–2001: Radnički Jugopetrol
- 2001–2004: Hemofarm
- 2004–2012: Partizan
- 2012–2013: Metalac Valjevo

Coaching
- 2013–2015: Partizan (assistant)
- 2015–2016: Partizan
- 2017–2021: Austin Spurs (assistant)
- 2021–2023: Austin Spurs
- 2023–2025: London Lions
- 2025–present: Shimane Susanoo Magic

Career highlights
- As player: 5× ABA League champion (2007–2011); 8× Serbian League champion (2005–2012); 5× Serbian Cup winner (2008–2012); As head coach: Super League champion (2025); SLB Coach of the Year (2025); British League champion (2024); As assistant coach: NBA G League champion (2018); ABA League champion (2013); 2× Serbian League champion (2013, 2014)

Petar Božić (Serbian Cyrillic: Петар Божић; born 6 December 1978) is a Serbian professional basketball coach and former player. He is currently the head coach for the Shimane Susanoo Magic of the Japanese B.League. During his playing career, Božić played as a point guard and shooting guard, and was well known for his defense and three-point shooting. He is the Partizan player with the second-most played games (471) in the history of the club, a record that was broken in January 2020 when Novica Veličković surpassed him. Božić is also a part of the Partizan Belgrade supporters All-decade Team.

== Playing career ==
Before coming to Partizan, Božić was a little-known player. He started his professional career in KK Beobanka, playing there for three years. He then played for the club Radnički Jugopetrol. He stayed there for just one season (2000–01). The last club he played for before Partizan was Hemofarm Vršac. After three seasons in Hemofarm, the team recommended him to Partizan.

Božić was signed by the Partizan Belgrade in 2004 at the beginning of the season. In the same season he won the Serbian Super League with the club. Years spent captaining the club, he became club legend with the most appearances (471 games played) for the club ever in history; record was broken in January 2020 after Novica Veličković surpassed him. He has won over 17 trophies with Partizan and is dubbed by the Partizan fans as a "professional trophy lifter".

== Coaching career ==
Following his retirement from the professional basketball, he was named an assistant coach of Duško Vujošević in Partizan back in 2013. After Partizan decided not to extend a contract with Vujošević, Božić was named the new head coach of the team in September 2015. On 5 January 2016, he parted ways with the team after 6–12 record in the ABA League.

In October 2017, Božić was hired by the Austin Spurs to be an assistant coach. In 2021, he was promoted to the head coaching position.

On 17 August 2023, Božić was named head coach for the London Lions of the British Basketball League (BBL) and the EuroCup.

On 22 May 2025, Božić was named head coach for the Shimane Susanoo Magic of the B.League.
