= Tautvydas Sabonis =

Lithuanian basketball coach and former player (born 1992)

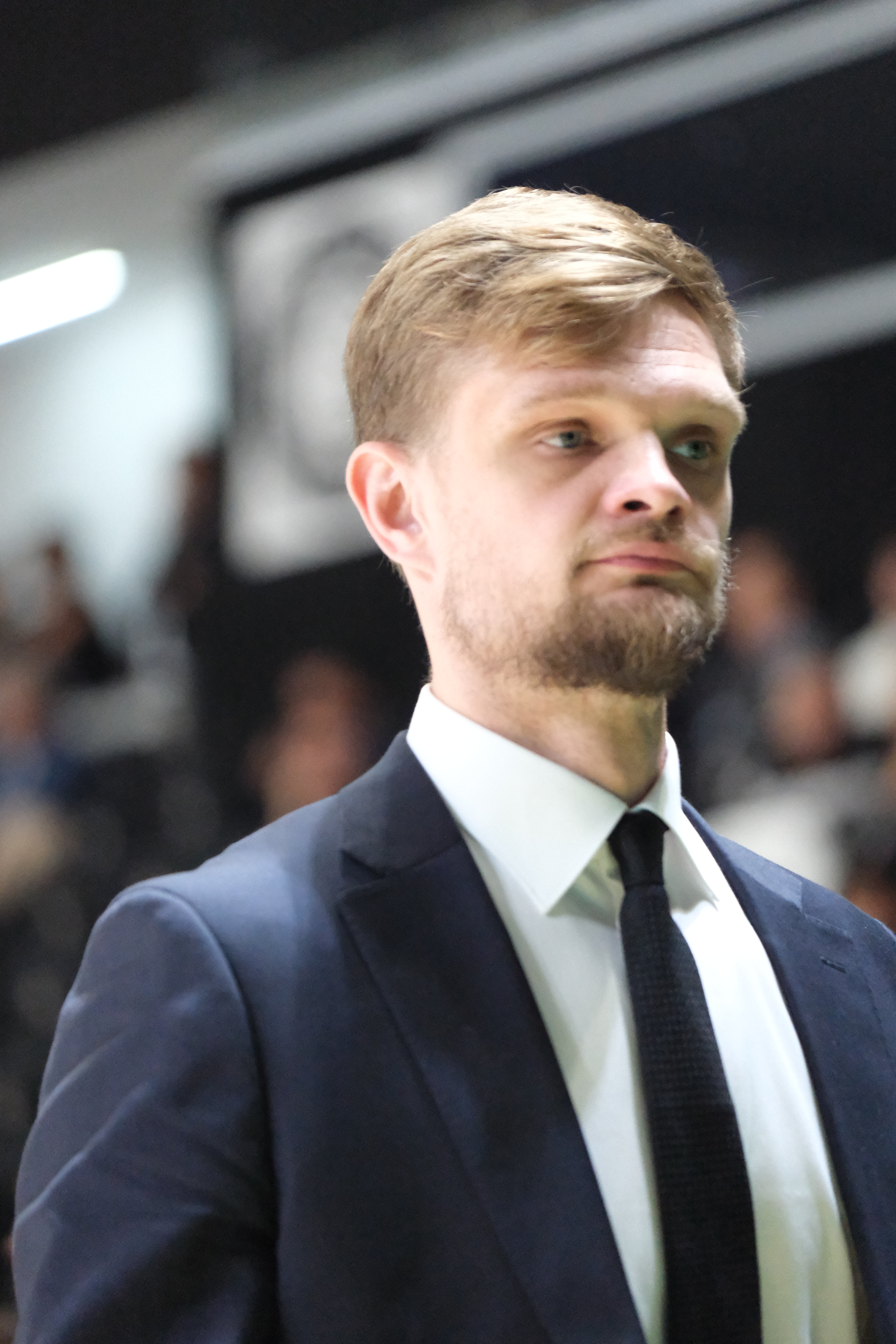
- Sabonis coaching the London Lions in 2025

London Lions
- Title: Head coach
- League: SLB; EuroCup

Personal information
- Born: May 1, 1992 (age 34) Valladolid, Spain
- Listed height: 6 ft 8 in (2.03 m)
- Listed weight: 202 lb (92 kg)

Career information
- NBA draft: 2014: undrafted
- Playing career: 2010–2019
- Position: Small forward / power forward
- Number: 11, 22
- Coaching career: 2019–present

Career history

Playing
- 2010–2015: Clinicas Rincón Malaga
- 2015–2016: Palma Air Europe Mallorca
- 2016–2017: Leyma Coruña
- 2017–2019: TAU Castelló

Coaching
- 2019–2020: Žalgiris-2 Kaunas (assistant)
- 2020–2025: Žalgiris Kaunas (assistant)
- 2025–present: London Lions

Career highlights
- As head coach: SLB champion (2026); SLB Cup winner (2026); SLB Trophy winner (2026); SLB Coach of the Year (2026); As assistant coach: 3× LKL champion (2021, 2023, 2025); 5× King Mindaugas Cup winner (2020–2025)
Medals
Men's basketball
Representing Lithuania
FIBA Europe Under-20 Championship
Gold medal – first place	2012 Slovenia	U-20 Team
FIBA World Under-19 Championship
Gold medal – first place	2011 Latvia	U-19 Team
FIBA Europe Under-18 Championship
Gold medal – first place	2010 Lithuania	U-18 Team
FIBA Europe Under-16 Championship
Gold medal – first place	2008 Italy	U-16 Team

Tautvydas Sabonis (born May 1, 1992) is a Lithuanian professional basketball coach and former player who is the head coach for the London Lions of the British Super League Basketball (SLB) and the EuroCup. As a player Sabonis has represented the Lithuania men's youth national basketball teams and won four gold medals. During his professional playing career he played at the small forward and power forward positions. He is a son of the Hall of Fame player Arvydas Sabonis and brother of a three times NBA All-Star Domantas Sabonis.

== Early life ==
Sabonis was born on May 1, 1992, in Valladolid, Spain when his father Arvydas Sabonis had played for the local basketball club CB Valladolid. He is Arvydas Sabonis second son, Žygimantas is his older brother and Domantas is his younger brother, he also has a younger sister Aušrinė.

== Playing career ==
During his career in European professional basketball clubs Sabonis mostly played for the Spanish second-tier basketball league teams Clinicas Rincón Malaga (2010–2015), Palma Air Europe Mallorca (2015–2016), Leyma Coruña (2016–2017), and TAU Castelló (2017–2019), except for the 2012–13 season when his team Clinicas Rincón Malaga played in the Spanish third-tier basketball league. At 27 years old he retired from professional basketball as a player.

== Coaching career ==
=== Žalgiris-2 Kaunas and Žalgiris Kaunas (2019–2025) ===
Following his retirement from professional basketball as a player, Sabonis in 2019 joined the Žalgiris-2 Kaunas as an assistant coach of Arvydas Gronskis. In 2020, he became an assistant coach of the primary Žalgiris Kaunas team and with it he won five King Mindaugas Cup titles and three Lithuanian Basketball League titles.

=== London Lions (2025–present) ===
In July 2025, Sabonis became a head coach for the London Lions of the top-tier British basketball league Super League Basketball and second-tier European basketball league EuroCup. During his debut season as a head coach the Lions in the EuroCup finished the regular season in an 8th place of Group B by winning five games out of 13 and failed to qualify for the 2026 EuroCup playoffs. Nevertheless, in the local British competitions the Lions achieved much more success as they in February 2026 won the Super League Basketball Cup, in March 2026 won the British Championship Basketball Cup, later won the 2025–26 Super League Basketball regular season with a 26–6 record and Sabonis was recognized as the Super League Coach of the Year. On 17 May 2026, the Lions won the Super League Basketball by defeating the Cheshire Phoenix 104–81 in the final. In August 2026, it was announced that the Lions will play a pre-season game versus the Portland Trail Blazers on 12 October 2026, becoming the first basketball club from the United Kingdom to play a game versus an National Basketball Association team.

== National team career ==
Sabonis had played for the Lithuania men's national under-16 team in the 2008 FIBA Europe Under-16 Championship, Lithuania men's national under-18 basketball team in the 2010 FIBA Europe Under-18 Championship, Lithuania men's national under-19 basketball team in the 2011 FIBA Under-19 World Championship, Lithuania men's national under-20 basketball team in the 2012 FIBA Europe Under-20 Championship, and during each of these four tournaments he had won gold medals being a reserve player averaging 2.5 points, 2.3 rebounds, 0.7 assists per game.
