= Surrey 89ers =

- League: SLB
- Established: 2024; 2 years ago
- History: Surrey 89ers (2024–present)
- Arena: Surrey Sports Park
- Capacity: 970
- Location: Guildford, Surrey
- Team colours: Green, white, tan, black
- Head coach: Lloyd Gardner
- Ownership: Dan Clark; Jodie Jackson

The Surrey 89ers are an English professional basketball team based in Guildford, Surrey, that compete in Super League Basketball.

== History ==
The club was formed in August 2024, following the dissolution of the Surrey Scorchers that competed in the British Basketball League. Former Great Britain national team player and Scorchers general manager Dan Clark announced the launch of the new Guildford-based franchise, the Surrey 89ers, in the Scorchers' place for the new top-flight basketball competition, Super League Basketball. As part of the announcement, the 89ers will have the same staff, players and front office members, including former Scorchers head coach Lloyd Gardner, while only changing the ownership structure, effectively making it a phoenix club. The team, nicknamed the "Niners", refers to 1889, the year in which the modern county of Surrey was established.

== Season-by-season records ==
| Champions | SLB champions | Runners-up | Playoff berth |

| Season | Tier | League | Regular season | | | | | Postseason | Cup | Trophy | Head coach |
| Season | Tier | League | Finish | Played | Wins | Losses | Win % | Postseason | Cup | Trophy | Head coach |
|---|---|---|---|---|---|---|---|---|---|---|---|
Surrey 89ers
| 2024–25 | 1 | SLB | 8th | 32 | 12 | 20 | .375 | Quarterfinals | Runners-up | Did not qualify | Lloyd Gardner |
| 2025–26 | 1 | SLB | 7th | 32 | 14 | 18 | .438 | Quarterfinals | Semifinals | Did not qualify | Lloyd Gardner |
| Championship record | | | | 64 | 26 | 38 | .406 | 0 championships | | | |
| Playoff record | | | | 4 | 0 | 4 | .000 | 0 playoff championships | | | |

== Players ==
=== Current roster ===
Note: Flags indicate national team eligibility at FIBA-sanctioned events. Players may hold other non-FIBA nationalities not displayed.

Surrey 89ers roster
Players
Coaches

| Pos. | No. | Nat. | Name | Ht. | Wt. | Age |
|---|---|---|---|---|---|---|
| G/F | 0 | (United States) | Small, Isiah | 2.02 m (6 ft 8 in) | 77 kg (170 lb) | 28 – 15 September 1998 |
| G/F | 1 | (United States) | Koonce, Owen | 1.96 m (6 ft 5 in) | 88 kg (194 lb) | 24 – 21 November 2001 |
| PG | 4 | (United Kingdom) | Lawrence, Andrew | 1.85 m (6 ft 1 in) | 87 kg (192 lb) | 36 – 4 June 1990 |
| PG | 7 | (United States) | Polite III, Ronald | 1.88 m (6 ft 2 in) | 84 kg (185 lb) | 24 – 18 March 2002 |
| G | 10 | (United States) | Lawrence, Tyrin | 1.93 m (6 ft 4 in) | 91 kg (201 lb) | 25 – 1 November 2000 |
| SG | 11 | (Saint Kitts and Nevis) (United Kingdom) | Queeley, Kareem | 1.93 m (6 ft 4 in) | 92 kg (203 lb) | 25 – 30 March 2001 |
| PG | 12 | (United States) | Lilly, Kino | 1.83 m (6 ft 0 in) | 75 kg (165 lb) | 24 – 9 September 2002 |
| G/F | 15 | (United Kingdom) | Ogedengbe, Tayo | 1.97 m (6 ft 6 in) | 95 kg (209 lb) | 39 – 15 May 1987 |
| G/F | 17 | (United Kingdom) (Lithuania) | Cholevinkas, Nedas | 1.96 m (6 ft 5 in) | 92 kg (203 lb) | 21 – 1 April 2005 |
| SF | 19 | (United Kingdom) | Nwankwo, Timothy | 1.97 m (6 ft 6 in) | | 20 – 6 July 2006 |
| PF | 21 | (United States) | Graham, Michael | 2.03 m (6 ft 8 in) | 104 kg (229 lb) | 26 – 1 September 2000 |
| G | 23 | (United Kingdom) | Parkinson, Di-Jani | 1.85 m (6 ft 1 in) | | 22 – 26 March 2004 |
| | 33 | (United Kingdom) | Coupe, Maximilian |
| G | 44 | (United Kingdom) | Smith-White, Joshua | | | 22 – 18 May 2004 |
| C | 55 | (United Kingdom) | Ling, Haydn | 2.19 m (7 ft 2 in) | | 24 – 19 September 2002 |

Head coach

- (United Kingdom) Lloyd Gardner

Assistant coach(es)

- (United Kingdom) Mark Dunning
- (United Kingdom) Pete Daines

Legend

- (C) Team captain
- Injured

== See also ==
- Basketball in England
- British Basketball League
- Thames Valley Tigers
- Surrey Scorchers
