= 2024–25 Super League Basketball season =

1st season of Super League Basketball

2024–25 SLB season
- League: Super League Basketball
- Sport: Basketball
- Duration: 27 September 2024 – 27 April 2025
- Teams: 9
- TV partners: Great Britain: DAZN; Online: YouTube

SLB Championship
- League champions: London Lions (1st title)
- Runners-up: Leicester Riders
- Season MVP: (United Kingdom) Aaryn Rai (London)

SLB Tournaments
- Trophy champions: Newcastle Eagles (1st title)
- Trophy runners-up: Bristol Flyers
- Cup champions: Sheffield Sharks (1st title)
- Cup runners-up: Surrey 89ers

SLB Playoffs
- Champions: Leicester Riders (1st title)
- Runners-up: Newcastle Eagles
- Finals MVP: (United States) Jaylin Hunter (Leicester)

SLB seasons
- ← 2023–24 (BBL) 2025–26 →

The 2024–25 SLB season is the inaugural season of Super League Basketball (SLB). The season features nine teams from across England and Scotland.

== Teams ==
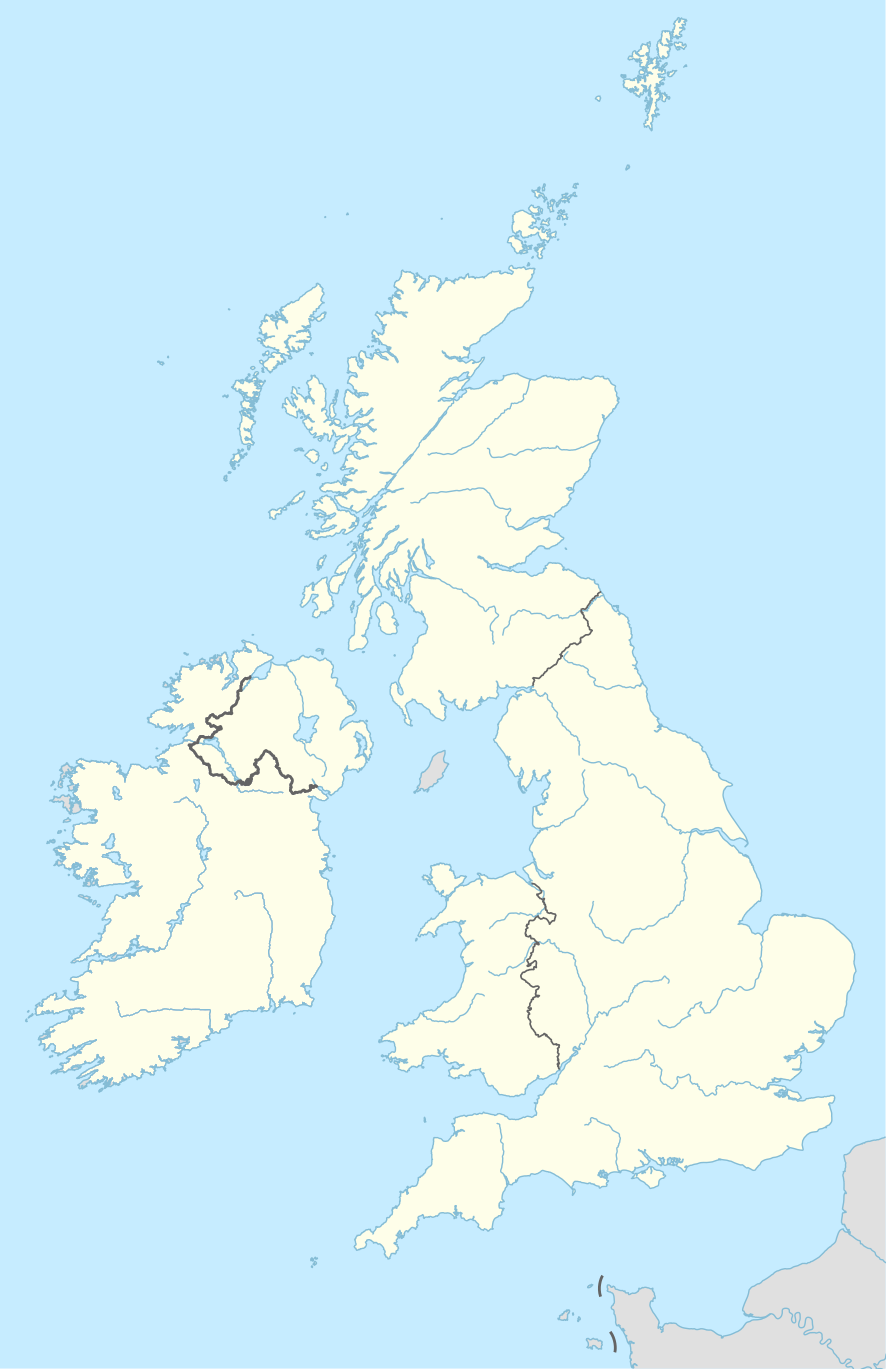
Locations of the 2024–25 SLB teams

=== Arenas and locations ===
Team	Location	Colours	Arena	Capacity	Founded
Bristol Flyers	(England) Bristol		SGS College Arena	750	2006
Caledonia Gladiators	(Scotland) East Kilbride		Playsport Arena	1,800	1998
Cheshire Phoenix	(England) Ellesmere Port		Cheshire Oaks Arena	1,400	1984
Leicester Riders	(England) Leicester		Mattioli Arena	2,400	1967
London Lions	(England) London (Stratford)		Copper Box Arena	6,000	1977
Manchester Basketball	(England) Manchester		National Basketball Centre	2,000	2024
Newcastle Eagles	(England) Newcastle		Vertu Motors Arena	2,800	1976
Sheffield Sharks	(England) Sheffield		Canon Medical Arena	2,500	1991
Surrey 89ers	(England) Guildford		Surrey Sports Park	970	2024

== SLB Championship ==
The SLB Championship maintained the four-game series format, reintroduced for the 2022–23 season, for a 32-game regular season.

=== Standings ===
Pos	Team	Pld	W	L	PF	PA	PD	Pts	Qualification
1	London Lions (C)	32	24	8	2740	2448	+292	48	Playoffs
2	Leicester Riders	32	23	9	2796	2552	+244	46	Playoffs
3	Sheffield Sharks	32	22	10	2613	2487	+126	44	Playoffs
4	Manchester Basketball	32	15	17	2755	2777	−22	30	Playoffs
5	Newcastle Eagles	32	14	18	2664	2749	−85	28	Playoffs
6	Cheshire Phoenix	32	14	18	2884	2963	−79	28	Playoffs
7	Bristol Flyers	32	13	19	2493	2596	−103	26	Playoffs
8	Surrey 89ers	32	12	20	2616	2714	−98	24	Playoffs
9	Caledonia Gladiators	32	7	25	2460	2735	−275	14	

Updated to match(es) played on 27 April 2025. Source: BBC Sport
(C) Champions

=== Results ===
Home \ Away	BRI	CAL	CHE	LEI	LON	MAN	NEW	SHE	SUR
Bristol Flyers	—	81–62	84–88	63–74	75–78	92–85	98–94	67–74	73–82
Bristol Flyers	—	86–73	81–93	68–67	78–88	76–62	67–85	71–64	87–86
Caledonia Gladiators	66–58	—	98–101	66–88	79–67	76–100	71–94	86–89	68–77
Caledonia Gladiators	68–57	—	94–96	93–88	53–84	85–91	76–90	83–87	90–81
Cheshire Phoenix	92–86	87–69	—	86–88	93–97	101–94	106–103	87–86	112–78
Cheshire Phoenix	94–122	89–75	—	78–91	90–105	80–87	99–89	65–87	95–104
Leicester Riders	83–74	85–74	110–87	—	84–75	99–86	89–65	79–82	91–81
Leicester Riders	94–59	98–78	94–90	—	80–71	89–76	99–81	100–95	91–84
London Lions	75–67	98–76	94–76	91–71	—	78–73	89–79	92–68	83–87
London Lions	77–69	96–51	90–78	97–80	—	88–90	79–68	80–77	80–69
Manchester Basketball	91–80	90–89	106–86	74–87	93–99	—	85–89	70–80	85–76
Manchester Basketball	92–97	93–91	99–86	100–93	72–108	—	86–79	76–72	104–88
Newcastle Eagles	68–86	86–81	94–88	93–90	74–67	69–100	—	84–92	81–77
Newcastle Eagles	84–55	67–83	110–101	91–106	80–91	89–80	—	80–67	81–88
Sheffield Sharks	102–90	86–71	87–85	79–61	60–77	83–75	80–73	—	93–85
Sheffield Sharks	88–69	74–81	101–82	77–76	90–82	93–74	90–79	—	82–77
Surrey 89ers	84–88	92–83	89–99	66–82	80–84	86–79	96–70	61–63	—
Surrey 89ers	83–89	79–71	71–94	72–89	88–80	93–87	87–95	69–65	—

Updated to match(es) played on 27 April 2025. Source: superleaguebasketballm.co.uk
Legend: Blue = home team win; Red = away team win.

== SLB Trophy ==
=== North Group ===
Pos	Team	Pld	W	L	PF	PA	PD	Pts	Qualification	CHE	NEW	SHE	CAL	MAN
1	Cheshire Phoenix	8	6	2	745	656	+89	12	Semifinals	—	90–82	100–102	95–74	116–85
2	Newcastle Eagles	8	5	3	634	641	−7	10	Semifinals	69–90	—	78–73	93–88	77–89
3	Sheffield Sharks	8	4	4	671	665	+6	8		79–84	82–84	—	84–75	89–77
4	Caledonia Gladiators	8	3	5	659	682	−23	6		86–81	66–71	80–94	—	99–77
5	Manchester Basketball	8	2	6	644	709	−65	4		79–89	63–80	87–68	87–91	—

Updated to match(es) played on 1 November 2024. Source: superleaguebasketballm.co.uk
Legend: Blue = home team win; Red = away team win.

=== South Group ===
Pos	Team	Pld	W	L	PF	PA	PD	Pts	Qualification	LEI	BRI	LON	SUR
1	Leicester Riders	6	6	0	537	449	+88	12	Semifinals	—	91–69	76–62	89–76
2	Bristol Flyers	6	3	3	521	505	+16	6	Semifinals	101–105	—	108–85	86–79
3	London Lions	6	2	4	455	494	−39	4		66–89	76–65	—	81–69
4	Surrey 89ers	6	1	5	455	520	−65	2		75–87	69–92	87–85	—

Updated to match(es) played on 27 October 2024. Source: superleaguebasketballm.co.uk
Legend: Blue = home team win; Red = away team win.

=== Semifinals ===
The first legs were played on 6 December, the second legs were played 8 December and 22 December.

Team 1	Aggregate	Team 2	1st leg	2nd leg
Cheshire Phoenix (Basketball England)	185–200	(Basketball England) Bristol Flyers	83–92	102–108
Leicester Riders (Basketball England)	174–178	(Basketball England) Newcastle Eagles	91–95	83–83

=== Trophy Final ===
The SLB Trophy final was played on 26 January 2025.

26 January 2025	Newcastle Eagles (Basketball England)	97–78	(Basketball England) Bristol Flyers	Birmingham, United Kingdom
15:30	Scoring by quarter: 31–19, 21–12, 21–19, 24–28
DAZN	Pts: Knight 22; Rebs: Allen-Eikens, Ward-Hibbert 8 Asts: Okauru 6	boxscore report	Pts: Lewis 18; Rebs: Lewis, Louis 6 Asts: Louis 7	Arena: Arena Birmingham; Attendance: 8,500; Referees: Eduard Udyanskyy, Iain Macdonald, Stephen Ferriss

== SLB Cup ==
=== Summary ===
Seven wildcard teams were invited to compete in the Cup competition, five from the English National Basketball League and two from the Scottish Basketball Championship.

=== Wildcard teams ===
- Derby Trailblazers (NBL)
- Essex Rebels (NBL)
- Hemel Storm (NBL)
- Nottingham Hoods (NBL)
- Reading Rockets (NBL)
- Falkirk Fury (SBC)
- St Mirren (SBC)

=== First round ===
The first round matches were played from 13 to 21 December 2024.

Home team	Score	Away team
Essex Rebels (Basketball England)	70–84	(Basketball England) Bristol Flyers
St Mirren (Basketballscotland)	60–113	(Basketball England) London Lions
Falkirk Fury (Basketballscotland)	61–130	(Basketball England) Leicester Riders
Nottingham Hoods (Basketball England)	67–108	(Basketball England) Cheshire Phoenix
Derby Trailblazers (Basketball England)	88–93	(Basketball England) Surrey 89ers
Reading Rockets (Basketball England)	72–84	(Basketball England) Sheffield Sharks
Newcastle Eagles (Basketball England)	87–90	(Basketballscotland) Caledonia Gladiators
Hemel Storm (Basketball England)	73–93	(Basketball England) Manchester Basketball

=== Quarterfinals ===
The quarterfinal matches were played from 12 to 22 January 2025.

Home team	Score	Away team
Sheffield Sharks (Basketball England)	92–78	(Basketball England) Cheshire Phoenix
London Lions (Basketball England)	86–95	(Basketball England) Surrey 89ers
Bristol Flyers (Basketball England)	71–58	(Basketballscotland) Caledonia Gladiators
Manchester Basketball (Basketball England)	77–83	(Basketball England) Leicester Riders

=== Semifinals ===
The first legs were played on 7 February, the second legs were played 9 February.

Team 1	Aggregate	Team 2	1st leg	2nd leg
Bristol Flyers (Basketball England)	127–154	(Basketball England) Sheffield Sharks	64–88	63–66
Surrey 89ers (Basketball England)	183–179	(Basketball England) Leicester Riders	93–93	90–86

=== Cup Final ===
The SLB Cup final was played on 9 March 2025.

9 March 2025	Sheffield Sharks (Basketball England)	105–97	(Basketball England) Surrey 89ers	Nottingham, United Kingdom
15:30	Scoring by quarter: 23–23, 26–28, 32–21, 24–25
DAZN	Pts: McGill, Nixon 24; Rebs: Clay 9 Asts: Nixon 5	boxscore report	Pts: James 26; Rebs: Adelekun 10; Asts: Ray 6	Arena: Nottingham Arena; Attendance: not available Referees: Joe Hodgson, Chris Dodds, Jonpaul Heron

== Playoffs ==
The 2025 SLB Playoffs were played in May 2025, consisting of four aggregate quarterfinal series, two aggregate semifinal series and the Playoff Final. The Playoff Final will be played at The O2 Arena, London.

=== Playoff bracket ===
Quarterfinals
1	London Lions	81	86	167
8	Surrey 89ers	76	69	145
4	Manchester Basketball	71	87	158
5	Newcastle Eagles	78	84	162
2	Leicester Riders	78	86	164
7	Bristol Flyers	55	80	135
3	Sheffield Sharks	79	99	178
6	Cheshire Phoenix	89	82	171

Semifinals
1	London Lions	71	75	146
5	Newcastle Eagles	77	77	154
2	Leicester Riders	75	97	172
3	Sheffield Sharks	85	77	162

Playoff Final
2	Leicester Riders	105
5	Newcastle Eagles	74

*Note: Pairings are reseeded after quarterfinals.

=== Quarterfinals ===
The quarterfinal matches were played on 2–5 May 2025.

==== (1) London Lions vs. (8) Surrey 89ers ====
Team 1	Aggregate	Team 2	1st leg	2nd leg
London Lions (Basketball England)	167–145	(Basketball England) Surrey 89ers	81–76	86–69

==== (2) Leicester Riders vs. (7) Bristol Flyers ====
Team 1	Aggregate	Team 2	1st leg	2nd leg
Leicester Riders (Basketball England)	164–135	(Basketball England) Bristol Flyers	78–55	86–80

==== (3) Sheffield Sharks vs. (6) Cheshire Phoenix ====
Team 1	Aggregate	Team 2	1st leg	2nd leg
Sheffield Sharks (Basketball England)	178–171	(Basketball England) Cheshire Phoenix	79–89	99–82

==== (4) Manchester Basketball vs. (5) Newcastle Eagles ====
Team 1	Aggregate	Team 2	1st leg	2nd leg
Manchester Basketball (Basketball England)	158–162	(Basketball England) Newcastle Eagles	71–78	87–84

=== Semifinals ===
The semifinal matches were played on 9–11 May 2025.

==== (1) London Lions vs. (5) Newcastle Eagles ====
Team 1	Aggregate	Team 2	1st leg	2nd leg
London Lions (Basketball England)	146–154	(Basketball England) Newcastle Eagles	71–77	75–77

==== (2) Leicester Riders vs. (3) Sheffield Sharks ====
Team 1	Aggregate	Team 2	1st leg	2nd leg
Leicester Riders (Basketball England)	172–162	(Basketball England) Sheffield Sharks	75–85	97–77

=== Playoff Final ===
The SLB Playoff final was played on 18 May 2025.

==== (2) Leicester Riders vs. (5) Newcastle Eagles ====
18 May 2025	Leicester Riders (Basketball England)	105–74	(Basketball England) Newcastle Eagles	London, United Kingdom
16:30	Scoring by quarter: 28–16, 25–26, 30–21, 22–11
DAZN	Pts: Hunter, Jackson 23; Rebs: Thompson 17; Asts: Johnson 7	boxscore report	Pts: Pulliam 22; Rebs: Ward-Hibbert 10; Asts: Pulliam 4	Arena: The O2 Arena; Attendance: 13,041; Referees: Kate Unsworth, Joshua Bowe, Rob Hickman

== Awards ==
- Most Valuable Player: Aaryn Rai (London Lions)
- Play-off Final MVP: Jaylin Hunter (Leicester Riders)
- Coach of the Year: Petar Božić (London Lions)
- Defensive Player of the Year: Charles Thompson (Leicester Riders)
- Most Improved Player: Nedas Chloevinskas (Surrey 89ers)
- Sixth Player of the Year: Ethan Wright (Leicester Riders)
- Community Champion of the Year: Nick Lewis (Manchester Basketball)

=== 2024–25 SLB Team of the Year ===
#	Player	Team
PG	Aaryn Rai	London Lions
SG	Prentiss Nixon	Sheffield Sharks
SF	Mike Okauru	Newcastle Eagles
PF	Zach Jackson	Leicester Riders
C	Charles Thompson	Leicester Riders

Source: 2024–25 SLB Team of the Year

=== 2024–25 SLB All-British Team of the Year ===
#	Player	Team
PG	Aaryn Rai	London Lions
SG	Jaiden Delaire	London Lions
SF	Joshua Ward-Hibbert	Newcastle Eagles
PF	Patrick Whelan	Caledonia Gladiators
C	Riley Abercrombie	Leicester Riders

Source: 2024–25 SLB All-British Team of the Year

=== 2024–25 SLB Defensive Team of the Year ===
#	Player	Team
PG	Larry Austin Jr.	Cheshire Phoenix
SG	Joshua Ward-Hibbert	Newcastle Eagles
SF	Alen Hadžibegović	London Lions
PF	Charles Thompson	Leicester Riders
C	Dame Adelekun	Surrey 89ers

Source: 2024–25 SLB Defensive Team of the Year

== British clubs in European competitions ==
Team	Competition	Progress
Caledonia Gladiators	Champions League	Qualifying round
Caledonia Gladiators	FIBA Europe Cup	Regular season
Bristol Flyers	ENBL	Regular season
Newcastle Eagles	ENBL	Runners up
