= Manchester Basketball =

- League: SLB (men); SLB (women); Europe Cup
- Established: 2024; 2 years ago
- History: Manchester Basketball (2024–present)
- Arena: National Basketball Centre
- Capacity: 2,000
- Location: Belle Vue, Manchester
- Team colours: Royal blue, red, white, black
- Ownership: Sherwood Family Investment Office

Manchester Basketball are an English professional basketball team based in the city of Manchester, that compete in Super League Basketball.

== Background ==
Following the removal of the professional league licence of the British Basketball League, a new top-flight basketball competition, Super League Basketball, was announced. The Manchester franchise in the previous competition, the Manchester Giants, were owned by the league due to a previous period of administration in 2023, and as such the club's brand and intellectual rights were held in the now-defunct company. A Manchester franchise for the new competition was acquired by Sherwood Family Investment Office, led by Ned Sherwood, with the franchise to be led by Ben Pierson. The team's name and brand were announced in September 2024.

== Men's team ==
=== Current roster ===
Note: Flags indicate national team eligibility at FIBA-sanctioned events. Players may hold other non-FIBA nationalities not displayed.

Manchester Basketball roster
Players
Coaches

Pos.	No.	Nat.	Name	Ht.	Wt.	Age
PG	1	(United Kingdom)	Brown, Jonathan	1.91 m (6 ft 3 in)	86 kg (190 lb)	26 – 20 April 2000
G/F	2	(United Kingdom)	Walsh, Elijah	1.93 m (6 ft 4 in)	84 kg (185 lb)	23 – 17 December 2002
F	3	(United Kingdom)	Sandy, Ciaran	2.01 m (6 ft 7 in)	88 kg (194 lb)	27 – 9 November 1999
PG	5	(United States)	Thompson, Keon	1.85 m (6 ft 1 in)	91 kg (201 lb)	23 – 9 October 2003
G	6	(United Kingdom)	Nelson, Luke	1.91 m (6 ft 3 in)	86 kg (190 lb)	31 – 29 June 1995
F/C	7	(United States)	Mitchell-Day, Brandon	2.03 m (6 ft 8 in)	92 kg (203 lb)	23 – 16 September 2003
G/F	9	(United Kingdom)	Cleary, Kaiyem	1.98 m (6 ft 6 in)	84 kg (185 lb)	27 – 8 March 1999
PG	11	(United States)	Johnson, Jordan	1.85 m (6 ft 1 in)	77 kg (170 lb)	27 – 7 October 1999
G/F	12	(United States)	Piggé, Chandler	1.96 m (6 ft 5 in)	95 kg (209 lb)	23 – 13 June 2003
F	13	(United Kingdom)	Henry, Kayne	2.00 m (6 ft 7 in)	95 kg (209 lb)	27 – 28 February 1999
PF	30	(United States)	Shelton, Duke	2.05 m (6 ft 9 in)	98 kg (216 lb)	29 – 25 November 1996
F/C	33	(United States)	Williams, Charlie	2.08 m (6 ft 10 in)	99 kg (218 lb)	23 – 1 January 2003
C	34	(United States)	Nicholson, Matt	2.13 m (7 ft 0 in)	127 kg (280 lb)

Head coach

- (United States) Matthew Otten

Assistant coach(es)

- (United States) Antoine Broxsie
- (United Kingdom) Matthew Pitkin

Legend

- (C) Team captain
- Injured

- Roster
Updated: 3 August 2026

=== Depth chart ===
Pos.	Starting 5	Bench 1	Bench 2
C	Matt Nicholson	Charlie Williams	Brandon Mitchell-Day
PF	Kayne Henry	Duke Shelton	Ciaran Sandy
SF	Chandler Piggé	Kaiyem Cleary
SG	Luke Nelson	Elijah Walsh
PG	Jonathan Brown	Jordan Johnson	Keon Thompson

== Season-by-season records ==
Champions	SLB champions	Runners-up	Playoff berth

Season	Tier	League	Regular season					Postseason	Cup	Trophy	Head coach
Season	Tier	League	Finish	Played	Wins	Losses	Win %	Postseason	Cup	Trophy	Head coach
Manchester Basketball
2024–25	1	SLB	4th	32	15	17	.469	Quarterfinals	Quarterfinal	Did not qualify	Herman Mandole
2025–26	1	SLB	3rd	32	19	13	.594	Semifinals	Runners-up	Did not qualify	Matthew Otten
Championship record				64	34	30	.531	0 championships			
Playoff record				6	3	3	.500	0 playoff championships			

== Women's team ==
=== Current roster ===
Note: Flags indicate national team eligibility at FIBA-sanctioned events. Players may hold other non-FIBA nationalities not displayed.

Manchester Basketball roster
Players
Coaches

Pos.	No.	Nat.	Name	Ht.	Wt.	Age
G	2	(United Kingdom)	Cook, Macy	1.61 m (5 ft 3 in)		22 – 1 January 2004
G	3	(United States)	Brown, Janelle	1.68 m (5 ft 6 in)		24 – 3 June 2002
G	7	(United States)	Lau, Caroline	1.75 m (5 ft 9 in)		23 – 24 September 2003
G	9	(United Kingdom)	Robb, Hannah	1.75 m (5 ft 9 in)		28 – 28 April 1998
F	11	(Lithuania)	Karasaite, Eva	1.82 m (6 ft 0 in)		23 – 16 September 2003
F/C	12	(Estonia)	Bratka, Maaja (C)	1.91 m (6 ft 3 in)		34 – 16 June 1992
F	14	(Ireland)	O'Donnell, Ella	1.91 m (6 ft 3 in)		23 – 29 September 2003
G	15	(United Kingdom)	Brierley, Gina	1.73 m (5 ft 8 in)		29 – 22 October 1997
G	19	(Spain)	Odemwingie, Success	1.64 m (5 ft 5 in)		19 – 10 January 2007
C	21	(United Kingdom)	Price, Maya	1.90 m (6 ft 3 in)		26 – 11 December 1999
G	22	(United States)	Mastellone, Jenna	1.78 m (5 ft 10 in)		27 – 4 January 1999
G/F	25	(Finland)	Pirttinen, Veera	1.80 m (5 ft 11 in)		29 – 24 June 1997

Head coach

- (United Kingdom) Oliver Parr

Assistant coach(es)

- (United Kingdom) Mbongeni Mpofu

Legend

- (C) Team captain
- Injured

- Roster
Updated: 14 November 2026

=== Women's season-by-season records ===
Champions	SLB W champions	Runners-up	Playoff berth

Season	Tier	League	Regular season					Postseason	Cup	Trophy	Head coach
Season	Tier	League	Finish	Played	Wins	Losses	Win %	Postseason	Cup	Trophy	Head coach
Manchester Basketball
2024–25	1	SLB W	5th	20	13	7	.650	QF	-	Group B	Rheanne Bailey
2025–26	1	SLB W	7th	18	7	11	.389	QF	Finalists	Group Stage	Oliver Parr
Championship record				38	20	18	.526	0 championships			
Playoff record				2	0	2	.000	0 playoff championships			

== See also ==
- Basketball in England
- British Basketball League
- Manchester Giants (men)
- Manchester Giants (women)
