= Super League Basketball =

Professional men's basketball league in Great Britain

- Founded: 2024; 2 years ago
- First season: 2024–25
- Country: Great Britain
- Federation: British Basketball
- Confederation: FIBA Europe (Europe)
- Number of teams: 10
- Level on pyramid: 1
- International cup(s): Champions League; FIBA Europe Cup
- Current champions: London Lions (2nd title) (2025–26)
- Most championships: London Lions (2 titles)
- TV partners: DAZN
- Website: SuperLeagueBasketballM.co.uk
- 2026–27 Super League Basketball season

Super League Basketball (SLB) is a men's professional basketball league established in 2024. The competition replaced the former British Basketball League (BBL) as the top-level men's basketball competition in Great Britain.

== History ==
From 1987, the British Basketball League (BBL) was the pre-eminent basketball competition in Great Britain. By May 2024, Basketball League Ltd (BLL), the operating company behind the BBL, was in severe financial difficulties. Due to this uncertainty, the British Basketball Federation (BBF) terminated BLL's operating licence to run the men's professional league, with immediate effect. On the same day a new organisation, Premier Basketball Limited, was formed by a consortium of existing basketball teams formerly of the BBL. The consortium, led by Sarah Backovic, director of Sheffield Sharks, was granted a three-year licence by the BBF to operate the top-level men's basketball competition, in place of the former BBL. On 2 August 2024, "Super League Basketball" was announced as the name for the new competition.

=== Expansion ===
Plans for a new professional team emerged in August 2025, when SLB was reported to be seeking a tenth member club with backing from an American investor. Liverpool was identified as the league's principal expansion target during August and September 2025.

Liverpool Basketball was announced publicly on 5 August 2026, ahead of the 2026–27 season. The team is owned by Kings Dock Sports Group Ltd, the sports holding company founded by media executive and sports investor Jason Dolan. The launch returned top-flight men's professional basketball to Liverpool for the first time in more than a decade; the Mersey Tigers had played at the same arena from 2008 to 2010.

== Teams ==
=== Current teams ===
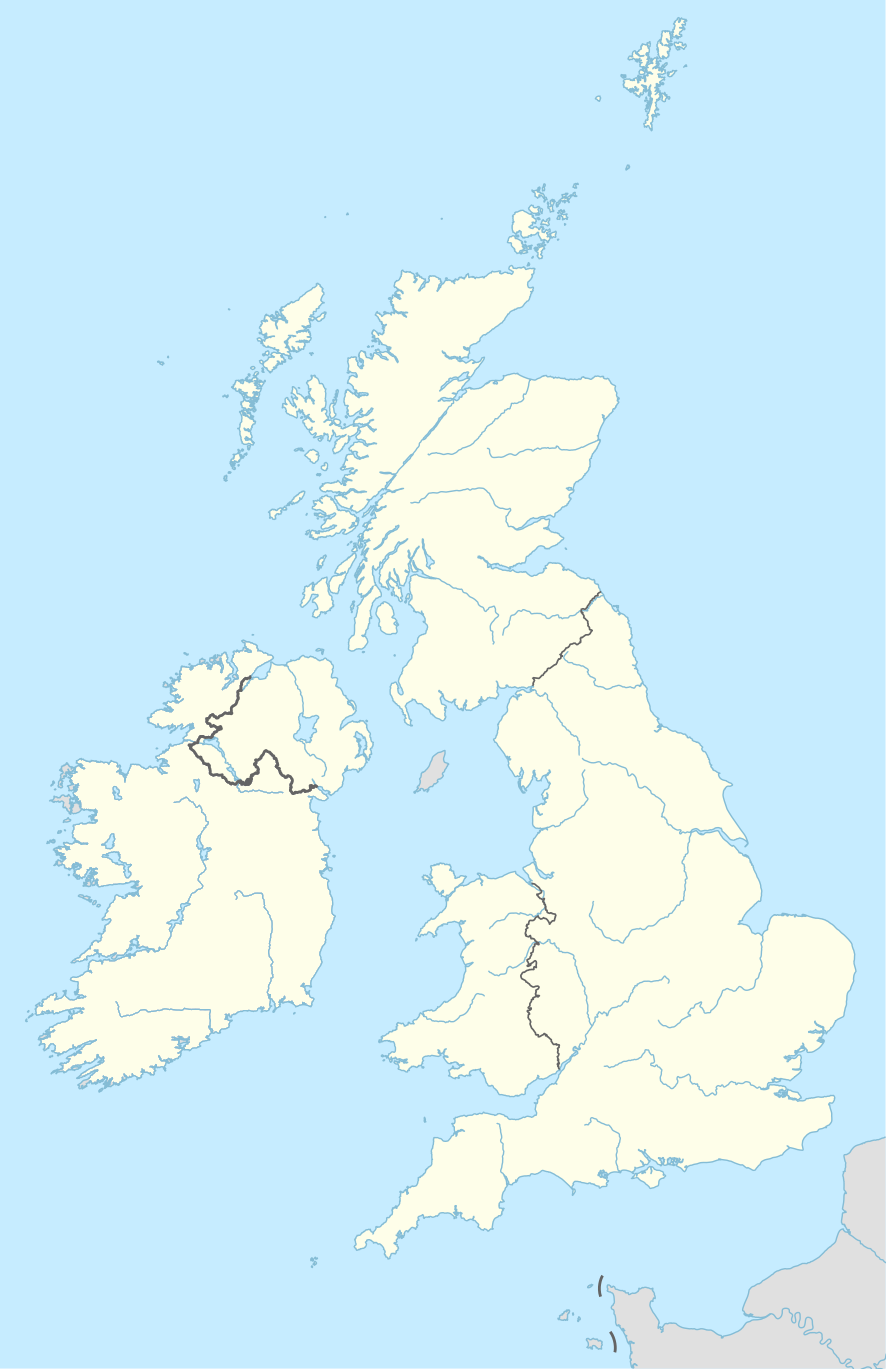
Locations of the current 2026–27 SLB teams

Team	Location	Colours	Arena	Capacity	Founded
Bristol Flyers	(England) Bristol		SGS College Arena	750	2006
Caledonia Gladiators	(Scotland) East Kilbride		Playsport Arena	1,800	1998
Cheshire Phoenix	(England) Ellesmere Port		Cheshire Oaks Arena	1,400	1984
Leicester Riders	(England) Leicester		Mattioli Arena	2,400	1967
Liverpool Basketball	(England) Liverpool		M&S Bank Arena	8,500	2026
London Lions	(England) London (Stratford)		Copper Box Arena	6,000	1977
Manchester Basketball	(England) Manchester		National Basketball Centre	2,000	2024
Newcastle Eagles	(England) Newcastle		Vertu Motors Arena	2,800	1976
Sheffield Sharks	(England) Sheffield		Canon Medical Arena	2,500	1991
Surrey 89ers	(England) Guildford		Surrey Sports Park	970	2024

== Corporate structure ==
=== Chairman ===
- Vaughn Millette (2024–2025)
- Sanjay Bhandari MBE (interim 2025–2026)

=== The Board ===
Responsible for the overall direction of the company and setting a business plan for shareholders to approve.

=== The Shareholders ===
The clubs, who have ultimate ownership of the company and approve matters reserved for them.

=== SLB League Central Staff ===
Responsible for carrying out the operational and administrative functions of the organisation including managing the Competitions and ensuring clubs are compliant with the operating rules.

=== SLB Integrity Department ===
Responsible for maintaining Competition Integrity and operates a range of functions including; Discipline, Officiating, Medical, Safeguarding, and Anti-Doping.

== Regulations ==
=== Import players ===
Rules currently allow for each team to have a maximum of six non-British qualified players per game, and any number of British-qualified (National or Right-to-Work) players. During the course of a season, any Club may license a maximum of 12 non-national players, and any non-national player who is delicensed and subsequently relicensed by a club will count as a new licence for the purposes of the calculation.

=== Transfer regulations ===
Players may be licensed at any time prior to midday on the last day of March during that season.

=== Salary cap ===
There is no salary cap in the league. Instead, clubs' total player emoluments are monitored and used to determine registration eligibility, including limits on the number of non-national players permitted in SLB Competitions.

Clubs are limited on the number of non-national players they are permitted to field in SLB Competitions, based on their total declared emoluments:

- Less than £1,018,950 gross, the club may field a maximum of six (6) non-national players.
- Between £1,018,950 – £1,390,200 gross, the club may field a maximum of five (5) non-national players.
- Greater than £1,390,200 gross, the club may field a maximum of four (4) non-national players.

== Results ==
=== Championship ===
Overview of SLB Championships

Season	Champions	Runners-up
2024–25	London Lions (1st)	Leicester Riders
2025–26	London Lions (2nd)	Cheshire Phoenix

=== Playoff Finals ===
Season	Winners	Score	Runners-up	Venue	Most Valuable Player
2024–25	Leicester Riders	105–74	Newcastle Eagles	The O2 Arena, London	(United States) Jaylin Hunter
2025–26	London Lions	104–81	Cheshire Phoenix	The O2 Arena, London	(United States) Joel Scott

=== Trophy Finals ===
Season	Winners	Score	Runners-up	Venue	Most Valuable Player
2024–25	Newcastle Eagles	97–78	Bristol Flyers	Arena Birmingham, Birmingham	(United States) Mike Okauru
2025–26	London Lions	74–68	Newcastle Eagles	Arena Birmingham, Birmingham	(United Kingdom) Deane Williams

=== Cup Finals ===
Season	Winners	Score	Runners-up	Venue	Most Valuable Player
2024–25	Sheffield Sharks	105–97	Surrey 89ers	Nottingham Arena, Nottingham	(United States) Donovan Clay
2025–26	London Lions	83–74	Manchester Basketball	Manchester Arena, Manchester	(United States) Kameron McGusty

=== Honours board ===
Rank	Team	Wins	RU	Wins	RU	Wins	RU	Wins	RU	Wins	RU
Rank	Team	SLB Championship		SLB Playoffs		SLB Cup		SLB Trophy		Total	
1	London Lions	2	0	1	0	1	0	1	0	5	0
2	Newcastle Eagles	0	0	0	1	0	0	1	1	1	2
3	Leicester Riders	0	1	1	0	0	0	0	0	1	1
4	Sheffield Sharks	0	0	0	0	1	0	0	0	1	0
5	Cheshire Phoenix	0	1	0	1	0	0	0	0	0	2
6	Bristol Flyers	0	0	0	0	0	0	0	1	0	1
6	Manchester Basketball	0	0	0	0	0	1	0	0	0	1
6	Surrey 89ers	0	0	0	0	0	1	0	0	0	1

*Note: † Defunct club.

*Note: This is a ranking of all SLB clubs titles won both throughout SLB history.

Source: Honours board

== Awards ==
- Player of the Year Award (MVP)
- Player of the Month Award
- Coach of the Year Award
- Coach of the Month Award
- Defensive Player of the Year Award
- Most Improved Player of the Year Award
- 6th Player of the Year Award
- Community Champion of the Year
- Playoff Final MVP
- Cup Final MVP
- Trophy Final MVP
- Team of the Year
- All-British Team of the Year
- Defensive Team of the Year

== See also ==
- Super League Basketball Women
- British Championship Basketball (2nd tier)
- National Basketball League (3rd–5th tiers)
- Scottish Basketball Championship Men (3rd tier)
- British Basketball League (1987–2024)
