= 2025–26 Super League Basketball season =

2nd season of Super League Basketball

2025–26 SLB season
- League: Super League Basketball
- Sport: Basketball
- Duration: 19 September 2025 – 17 May 2026
- Teams: 9
- TV partners: Great Britain: DAZN; Online: YouTube

SLB Championship
- League champions: London Lions (2nd title)
- Runners-up: Cheshire Phoenix
- Season MVP: (United States) Patrick Robinson (Cheshire)

SLB Tournaments
- Trophy champions: London Lions (1st title)
- Trophy runners-up: Newcastle Eagles
- Cup champions: London Lions (1st title)
- Cup runners-up: Manchester Basketball

SLB Playoffs
- Champions: London Lions (1st title)
- Runners-up: Cheshire Phoenix
- Finals MVP: (United States) Joel Scott (London)

SLB seasons
- ← 2024–25 2026–27 →

The 2025–26 SLB season is the second season of Super League Basketball (SLB). The season features nine teams from across England and Scotland.

== Teams ==
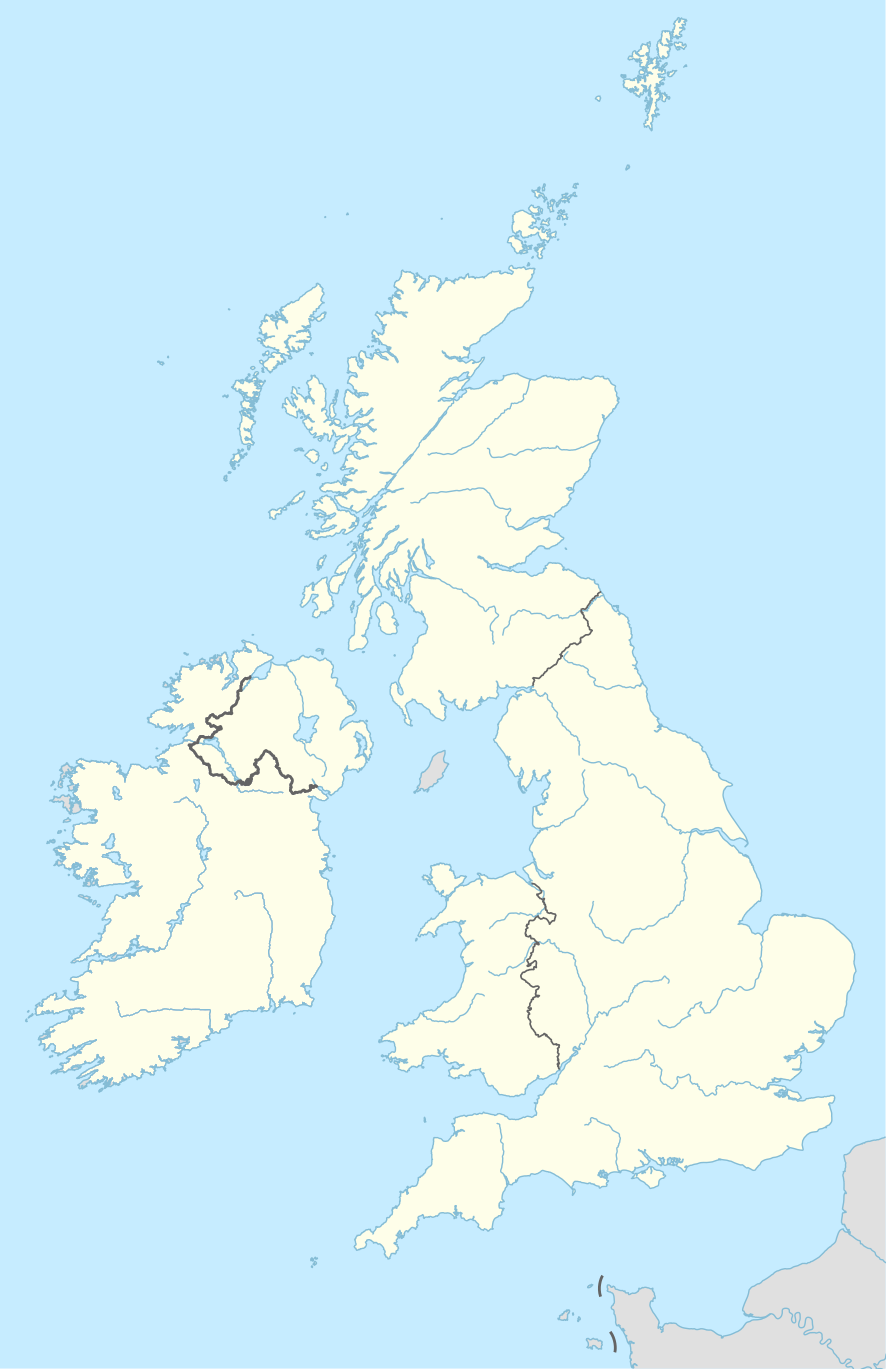
Locations of the 2025–26 SLB teams

=== Arenas and locations ===
| Team | Location | Colours | Arena | Capacity | Founded |
|---|---|---|---|---|---|
| Bristol Flyers | (England) Bristol | | SGS College Arena | 750 | 2006 |
| Caledonia Gladiators | (Scotland) East Kilbride | | Playsport Arena | 1,800 | 1998 |
| Cheshire Phoenix | (England) Ellesmere Port | | Cheshire Oaks Arena | 1,400 | 1984 |
| Leicester Riders | (England) Leicester | | Mattioli Arena | 2,400 | 1967 |
| London Lions | (England) London (Stratford) | | Copper Box Arena | 6,000 | 1977 |
| Manchester Basketball | (England) Manchester | | National Basketball Centre | 2,000 | 2024 |
| Newcastle Eagles | (England) Newcastle | | Vertu Motors Arena | 2,800 | 1976 |
| Sheffield Sharks | (England) Sheffield | | Canon Medical Arena | 2,500 | 1991 |
| Surrey 89ers | (England) Guildford | | Surrey Sports Park | 970 | 2024 |

== SLB Championship ==
The SLB Championship maintained the four-game series format, reintroduced for the 2024–25 season, for a 32-game regular season.

| Pos | Team | Pld | W | L | PF | PA | PD | Pts | Qualification |
|---|---|---|---|---|---|---|---|---|---|
| 1 | London Lions (C) | 32 | 26 | 6 | 2681 | 2352 | +329 | 52 | Playoffs |
| 2 | Cheshire Phoenix | 32 | 20 | 12 | 3065 | 2847 | +218 | 40 | Playoffs |
| 3 | Manchester Basketball | 32 | 19 | 13 | 2835 | 2785 | +50 | 38 | Playoffs |
| 4 | Sheffield Sharks | 32 | 16 | 16 | 2667 | 2655 | +12 | 32 | Playoffs |
| 5 | Leicester Riders | 32 | 15 | 17 | 2678 | 2795 | −117 | 30 | Playoffs |
| 6 | Bristol Flyers | 32 | 15 | 17 | 2600 | 2653 | −53 | 30 | Playoffs |
| 7 | Surrey 89ers | 32 | 14 | 18 | 2778 | 2845 | −67 | 28 | Playoffs |
| 8 | Newcastle Eagles | 32 | 12 | 20 | 2824 | 2854 | −30 | 24 | Playoffs |
| 9 | Caledonia Gladiators | 32 | 7 | 25 | 2609 | 2951 | −342 | 14 | |

Updated to match(es) played on 26 April 2026. Source: BBC Sport
(C) Champions

=== Results ===
| Home \ Away | BRI | CAL | CHE | LEI | LON | MAN | NEW | SHE | SUR |
|---|---|---|---|---|---|---|---|---|---|
| Bristol Flyers | — | 103–94 | 86–95 | 74–70 | 68–54 | 78–84 | 76–98 | 78–60 | 86–87 |
| Bristol Flyers | — | 87–67 | 94–95 | 79–84 | 76–83 | 77–86 | 94–75 | 77–67 | 79–89 |
| Caledonia Gladiators | 91–93 | — | 76–101 | 79–65 | 51–96 | 74–62 | 104–108 | 65–73 | 76–93 |
| Caledonia Gladiators | 82–91 | — | 80–114 | 93–95 | 74–82 | 75–88 | 67–96 | 70–92 | 73–86 |
| Cheshire Phoenix | 111–84 | 108–96 | — | 88–89 | 74–89 | 116–90 | 91–85 | 90–87 | 100–90 |
| Cheshire Phoenix | 116–73 | 111–101 | — | 98–77 | 79–99 | 98–99 | 101–98 | 114–95 | 106–84 |
| Leicester Riders | 85–73 | 85–79 | 95–93 | — | 72–79 | 102–95 | 91–77 | 65–93 | 80–89 |
| Leicester Riders | 85–78 | 100–106 | 78–82 | — | 75–83 | 98–101 | 102–100 | 87–85 | 90–103 |
| London Lions | 72–60 | 81–73 | 89–83 | 82–70 | — | 74–91 | 95–82 | 87–67 | 87–72 |
| London Lions | 77–57 | 81–68 | 92–95 | 95–78 | — | 71–72 | 98–71 | 81–60 | 92–84 |
| Manchester Basketball | 80–85 | 83–82 | 92–89 | 87–72 | 74–82 | — | 102–98 | 87–75 | 90–95 |
| Manchester Basketball | 80–83 | 101–78 | 97–91 | 89–86 | 86–91 | — | 105–79 | 84–106 | 94–80 |
| Newcastle Eagles | 83–87 | 79–87 | 88–70 | 98–85 | 77–82 | 93–120 | — | 95–99 | 92–89 |
| Newcastle Eagles | 83–85 | 104–80 | 108–97 | 86–94 | 50–76 | 95–98 | — | 82–85 | 99–72 |
| Sheffield Sharks | 76–69 | 77–71 | 101–97 | 93–68 | 83–92 | 98–79 | 78–73 | — | 88–94 |
| Sheffield Sharks | 85–94 | 113–75 | 77–75 | 80–92 | 79–73 | 74–82 | 68–80 | — | 99–96 |
| Surrey 89ers | 66–96 | 85–100 | 79–86 | 78–80 | 89–80 | 94–80 | 82–88 | 88–77 | — |
| Surrey 89ers | 93–80 | 117–120 | 79–101 | 80–83 | 62–86 | 94–77 | 94–103 | 95–77 | — |

Updated to match(es) played on 26 April 2026. Source: superleaguebasketballm.co.uk
Legend: Blue = home team win; Red = away team win.

== SLB Trophy ==
=== Group 1 ===
| Pos | Team | Pld | W | L | PF | PA | PD | Pts | Qualification | NEW | SHE | CAL |
|---|---|---|---|---|---|---|---|---|---|---|---|---|
| 1 | Newcastle Eagles | 2 | 2 | 0 | 173 | 165 | +8 | 4 | Semifinals | — | 94–89 | |
| 2 | Sheffield Sharks | 2 | 1 | 1 | 179 | 173 | +6 | 2 | | | — | 90–79 |
| 3 | Caledonia Gladiators | 2 | 0 | 2 | 155 | 169 | −14 | 0 | | 76–79 | | — |

Updated to match(es) played on 14 December 2025. Source: superleaguebasketballm.co.uk
Legend: Blue = home team win; Red = away team win.

=== Group 2 ===
| Pos | Team | Pld | W | L | PF | PA | PD | Pts | Qualification | CHE | LEI | MAN |
|---|---|---|---|---|---|---|---|---|---|---|---|---|
| 1 | Cheshire Phoenix | 2 | 2 | 0 | 180 | 155 | +25 | 4 | Semifinals | — | 98–78 | |
| 2 | Leicester Riders | 2 | 1 | 1 | 189 | 206 | −17 | 2 | | | — | 111–108 |
| 3 | Manchester Basketball | 2 | 0 | 2 | 185 | 193 | −8 | 0 | | 77–82 | | — |

Updated to match(es) played on 14 December 2025. Source: superleaguebasketballm.co.uk
Legend: Blue = home team win; Red = away team win.

=== Group 3 ===
| Pos | Team | Pld | W | L | PF | PA | PD | Pts | Qualification | LON | BRI | SUR |
|---|---|---|---|---|---|---|---|---|---|---|---|---|
| 1 | London Lions | 2 | 2 | 0 | 158 | 145 | +13 | 4 | Semifinals | — | | 87–83 |
| 2 | Bristol Flyers | 2 | 1 | 1 | 159 | 150 | +9 | 2 | Semifinals | 62–71 | — | |
| 3 | Surrey 89ers | 2 | 0 | 2 | 162 | 184 | −22 | 0 | | | 79–97 | — |

Updated to match(es) played on 14 December 2025. Source: superleaguebasketballm.co.uk
Legend: Blue = home team win; Red = away team win.

=== Semifinals ===
The first legs were played on 2 January, second legs 4 January.

| Team 1 | Aggregate | Team 2 | 1st leg | 2nd leg |
|---|---|---|---|---|
| Newcastle Eagles (Basketball England) | 205–201 | (Basketball England) Cheshire Phoenix | 100–89 | 105–112 |
| London Lions (Basketball England) | 154–134 | (Basketball England) Bristol Flyers | 77–58 | 77–76 |

=== Trophy Final ===
The SLB Trophy final was played on 1 February 2026.

| 1 February 2026 | London Lions (Basketball England) | 74–68 | (Basketball England) Newcastle Eagles | Birmingham, United Kingdom |
| 15:30 | Scoring by quarter: 21–17, 24–11, 12–17, 17–23 |
| DAZN | Pts: Brown 15; Rebs: Williams 7 Asts: Phillip, Williams 5 | boxscore report | Pts: Burden 20; Rebs: Long 9 Asts: Burden 6 | Arena: Arena Birmingham; Attendance: not available Referees: Paul Walton, Christopher Dodds, Ingus Bankevics |

== SLB Cup ==
=== Qualifying game ===
The qualifying game was played on 12 December 2025.

| Home team | Score | Away team |
|---|---|---|
| Surrey 89ers (Basketball England) | 99–69 | (Basketballscotland) Caledonia Gladiators |

=== Quarterfinals ===
The quarterfinal matches were played from 23 to 25 January 2026.

| Home team | Score | Away team |
|---|---|---|
| Leicester Riders (Basketball England) | 94–102 | (Basketball England) Surrey 89ers |
| Newcastle Eagles (Basketball England) | 68–94 | (Basketball England) London Lions |
| Manchester Basketball (Basketball England) | 92–67 | (Basketball England) Bristol Flyers |
| Sheffield Sharks (Basketball England) | 100–103 | (Basketball England) Cheshire Phoenix |

=== Semifinals ===
The first legs were played on 13 February, second legs 15 February.

| Team 1 | Aggregate | Team 2 | 1st leg | 2nd leg |
|---|---|---|---|---|
| London Lions (Basketball England) | 165–156 | (Basketball England) Cheshire Phoenix | 89–72 | 76–84 |
| Surrey 89ers (Basketball England) | 179–200 | (Basketball England) Manchester Basketball | 87–101 | 92–99 |

=== Cup Final ===
The SLB Cup final was played on 22 March 2026.

| 22 March 2026 | London Lions (Basketball England) | 83–74 | (Basketball England) Manchester Basketball | Manchester, United Kingdom |
| 16:30 | Scoring by quarter: 11–19, 21–21, 26–17, 25–17 |
| DAZN | Pts: McGusty 21; Rebs: Scott 12; Asts: McGusty 7 | boxscore report | Pts: Johnson 30; Rebs: Nicholson 8 Asts: three players 2 | Arena: Manchester Arena; Attendance: 6,000; Referees: Simon Unsworth, Joe Hodgson, Jonathan Vickerstaff |

== Playoffs ==
The 2026 SLB Playoffs will be played on 30 April to 17 May 2026, consisting of four aggregate quarterfinal series, two aggregate semifinal series and the Playoff Final. The Playoff Final will be played at The O2 Arena, London.

=== Playoff bracket ===
Quarterfinals
1 | London Lions | 90 | 88 | 178
8 | Newcastle Eagles | 72 | 69 | 141
4 | Sheffield Sharks | 81 | 87 | 168
5 | Leicester Riders | 78 | 97 | 175
2 | Cheshire Phoenix | 128 | 99 | 227
7 | Surrey 89ers | 96 | 95 | 191
3 | Manchester Basketball | 98 | 90 | 188
6 | Bristol Flyers | 95 | 85 | 180

Semifinals
1 | London Lions | 89 | 78 | 167
5 | Leicester Riders | 70 | 65 | 135
2 | Cheshire Phoenix | 106 | 123 | 229
3 | Manchester Basketball | 78 | 117 | 195

Playoff Final
1 | London Lions | 104
2 | Cheshire Phoenix | 81

*Note: Pairings are reseeded after quarterfinals.

=== Quarterfinals ===
The quarterfinal matches were played on 30 April to 3 May 2026.

==== (1) London Lions vs. (8) Newcastle Eagles ====
| Team 1 | Aggregate | Team 2 | 1st leg | 2nd leg |
|---|---|---|---|---|
| London Lions (Basketball England) | 178–141 | (Basketball England) Newcastle Eagles | 90–72 | 88–69 |

==== (2) Cheshire Phoenix vs. (7) Surrey 89ers ====
| Team 1 | Aggregate | Team 2 | 1st leg | 2nd leg |
|---|---|---|---|---|
| Cheshire Phoenix (Basketball England) | 227–191 | (Basketball England) Surrey 89ers | 128–96 | 99–95 |

==== (3) Manchester Basketball vs. (6) Bristol Flyers ====
| Team 1 | Aggregate | Team 2 | 1st leg | 2nd leg |
|---|---|---|---|---|
| Manchester Basketball (Basketball England) | 188–180 | (Basketball England) Bristol Flyers | 98–95 | 90–85 |

==== (4) Sheffield Sharks vs. (5) Leicester Riders ====
| Team 1 | Aggregate | Team 2 | 1st leg | 2nd leg |
|---|---|---|---|---|
| Sheffield Sharks (Basketball England) | 168–175 | (Basketball England) Leicester Riders | 81–78 | 87–97 |

=== Semifinals ===
The semifinal matches were played on 7–10 May 2026.

==== (1) London Lions vs. (5) Leicester Riders ====
| Team 1 | Aggregate | Team 2 | 1st leg | 2nd leg |
|---|---|---|---|---|
| London Lions (Basketball England) | 167–135 | (Basketball England) Leicester Riders | 89–70 | 78–65 |

==== (2) Cheshire Phoenix vs. (3) Manchester Basketball ====
| Team 1 | Aggregate | Team 2 | 1st leg | 2nd leg |
|---|---|---|---|---|
| Cheshire Phoenix (Basketball England) | 229–195 | (Basketball England) Manchester Basketball | 106–78 | 123–117 |

=== Playoff Final ===
The SLB Playoff final was played on 17 May 2026.

==== (1) London Lions vs. (2) Cheshire Phoenix ====
| 17 May 2026 | London Lions (Basketball England) | 104–81 | (Basketball England) Cheshire Phoenix | London, United Kingdom |
| 16:30 | Scoring by quarter: 35–23, 26–20, 24–22, 19–16 |
| BBC Sport | Pts: Scott 22; Rebs: Scott 17; Asts: Phillip, Reynolds 5 | boxscore report | Pts: Robinson 22; Rebs: Policelli 12; Asts: three players 2 | Arena: The O2 Arena; Attendance: 14,000; Referees: Paul Walton, Christopher Dodds, Joe Hodgson |

== Awards ==
- Most Valuable Player: Patrick Robinson (Cheshire Phoenix)
- Play-off Final MVP: Joel Scott (London Lions)
- Coach of the Year: Tautvydas Sabonis (London Lions)
- Defensive Player of the Year: Tarik Phillip (London Lions)
- Most Improved Player: Owen McCormack (Bristol Flyers)
- Sixth Player of the Year: Patrick Robinson (Cheshire Phoenix)
- Community Champion of the Year: Kyle Jimenez (Caledonia Gladiators)

=== 2025–26 SLB Team of the Year ===
| # | Player | Team |
|---|---|---|
| PG | Jordan Johnson | Manchester Basketball |
| SG | Patrick Robinson | Cheshire Phoenix |
| SF | Max Jones | Manchester Basketball |
| PF | Joel Scott | London Lions |
| C | Deane Williams | London Lions |

Source: 2025–26 SLB Team of the Year

=== 2025–26 SLB All-British Team of the Year ===
| # | Player | Team |
|---|---|---|
| PG | Flynn Boardman-Raffet | Leicester Riders |
| SG | Tarik Phillip | London Lions |
| SF | Skyler White | Cheshire Phoenix |
| PF | Tim Adetukasi | Manchester Basketball |
| C | Deane Williams | London Lions |

Source: 2025–26 SLB All-British Team of the Year

=== 2025–26 SLB Defensive Team of the Year ===
| # | Player | Team |
|---|---|---|
| PG | Laquincy Rideau | Cheshire Phoenix |
| SG | Tarik Phillip | London Lions |
| SF | Chaundee Brown | London Lions |
| PF | Michael Graham | Surrey 89ers |
| C | Deane Williams | London Lions |

Source: 2025–26 SLB Defensive Team of the Year

== British clubs in European competitions ==
| Team | Competition | Progress |
|---|---|---|
| London Lions | EuroCup | Regular season |
| Bristol Flyers | ENBL | Regular season |
| Manchester Basketball | ENBL | Runners-up |
| Newcastle Eagles | ENBL | Regular season |
