= 2022–23 Women's British Basketball League season =

2022–23 WBBL season
- League: WBBL
- Season: 2022–23
- Teams: 12

Regular season
- League: London Lions (2nd title)
- WBBL Cup: London Lions (2nd title)
- WBBL Trophy: London Lions (3rd title)

Finals
- Champions: London Lions (3rd title)

WBBL seasons
- ← 2021–22 2023-24 →

The 2022–23 WBBL season was the ninth season of the Women's British Basketball League, the top British women's professional basketball league, since its establishment in 2014. The season features 12 teams from across England, Scotland and Wales.

== Teams ==
Team	Location	Arena	Head Coach
(Scotland) Caledonia Gladiators	Paisley	Lagoon Centre	(Spain) Miguel Ángel Ortega Marco
(Wales) Cardiff Met Archers	Cardiff	Archers Arena	(United Kingdom) Stef Collins
(England) Durham Palatinates	Durham	Sports and Wellbeing Park	(United Kingdom) Matt Newby
(England) Essex Rebels	Colchester	Essex Sports Arena	(United Kingdom) Tom Sadler
(England) Leicester Riders	Loughborough	Loughborough University	(England) Krumesh Patel
(England) London Lions	London (Barking)	Barking Abbey School	(Greece) Styliani Kaltsidou
(England) Manchester Met Mystics	Manchester	National Basketball Centre	(United States) Jeff Jones
(England) Newcastle Eagles	Newcastle upon Tyne	Eagles Community Arena	(Spain) Noelia Cacheiro
(England) Nottingham Wildcats	Nottingham	Nottingham Wildcats Arena	(United Kingdom) Kenrick Liburd
(England) Oaklands Wolves	St Albans	Oaklands College	(United Kingdom) Lauren Milligan
(England) Sevenoaks Suns	Sevenoaks	Sevenoaks Sports Centre	(United States) Len Busch
(England) Sheffield Hatters	Sheffield	All Saints Sports Centre	(United Kingdom) Vanessa Ellis

== WBBL Championship ==
Each team will play each other once home and once away for a 22-game regular season. The top 8 teams will qualify for the post-season playoffs.

=== Standings ===
Pos	Team	Pld	W	L	PF	PA	PD	Pts	Qualification
1	London Lions (C)	22	21	1	2060	1149	+911	42	Qualification to playoffs
2	Caledonia Gladiators	22	17	5	1562	1327	+235	34	Qualification to playoffs
3	Leicester Riders	22	17	5	1626	1293	+333	34	Qualification to playoffs
4	Sheffield Hatters	22	16	6	1707	1423	+284	32	Qualification to playoffs
5	Sevenoaks Suns	22	15	7	1635	1449	+186	30	Qualification to playoffs
6	Essex Rebels	22	10	12	1526	1626	−100	20	Qualification to playoffs
7	Cardiff Met Archers	22	9	13	1603	1755	−152	18	Qualification to playoffs
8	Newcastle Eagles	22	9	13	1451	1632	−181	18	Qualification to playoffs
9	Durham Palatinates	22	9	13	1539	1656	−117	18	
10	Oaklands Wolves	22	5	17	1485	1998	−513	10	
11	Nottingham Wildcats	22	3	19	1389	1835	−446	6	
12	Manchester Met Mystics	22	1	21	1201	1641	−440	2	

Source: WBBL
(C) Champions

== WBBL Cup ==
The 2022–23 WBBL Cup will be a straight knockout competition featuring all twelve clubs. The top 4 teams from the 2021–22 WBBL Championship (London Lions, Sevenoaks Suns, Sheffield Hatters and Leicester Riders) received a bye to the quarter-finals. The remaining teams were seeded based on their finishing positions in the 2021–22 WBBL Championship.

First round

15 Oct 2022

Durham Palatinates	84–65	Manchester Met Mystics

15 Oct 2022

Essex Rebels	20–0	Newcastle Eagles

15 Oct 2022

Nottingham Wildcats	96–61	Oaklands Wolves

16 Oct 2022

Caledonia Gladiators	72–68	Cardiff Met Archers

Quarter-finals

12 Nov 2022

Essex Rebels	69–56	Durham Palatinates

12 Nov 2022

Caledonia Gladiators	64–67	Sevenoaks Suns

12 Nov 2022

London Lions	102–48	Sheffield Hatters

13 Nov 2022

Nottingham Wildcats	53–80	Leicester Riders

Semi-finals

18 Dec 2022

Sevenoaks Suns	69–84	London Lions

18 Dec 2022

Leicester Riders	83–69	Essex Rebels

Final

Sky Sports

29 Jan 2023

Leicester Riders	42–95	London Lions
Pts: O. Squires (23); Rebs: A. Arlen (7); Asts: A. Arlen, H. Robb, K. Brown (2)		Pts: M. Herbert Harrigan (19); Rebs: M. Herbert Harrigan (6); Asts: H. Winterburn (9)

Arena Birmingham, Birmingham

== Betty Codona Trophy ==
First round

7 Jan 2023

Brent Bulls	42–98	London Lions

7 Jan 2023

Durham Palatinates	80–85	Cardiff Met Archers

7 Jan 2023

Essex Rebels	79–64	Sevenoaks Suns

7 Jan 2023

Caledonia Gladiators	69–47	Thames Valley Cavaliers

8 Jan 2023

Oaklands Wolves	53–104	Leicester Riders

8 Jan 2023

Manchester Met Mystics	68–42	Southwark Pride

8 Jan 2023

Newcastle Eagles	90–82	Nottingham Wildcats

8 Jan 2023

Sheffield Hatters	137–72	Ipswich

Quarter-finals

15 Feb 2023

Cardiff Met Archers	55–104	London Lions

18 Feb 2023

Manchester Met Mystics	59–90	Sheffield Hatters

18 Feb 2023

Leicester Riders	54–44	Caledonia Gladiators

18 Feb 2023

Essex Rebels	67–68	Newcastle Eagles

Semi-finals

12 Mar 2023

London Lions	112–77	Sheffield Hatters

18 Mar 2023

Newcastle Eagles	63–91	Leicester Riders

Final

26 Mar 2023

London Lions	81–70	Leicester Riders
