= 2021–22 Women's British Basketball League season =

2021–22 WBBL season
- League: WBBL
- Season: 2021–22
- Teams: 13

Regular season
- League: London Lions (1st title)
- WBBL Cup: London Lions (1st title)
- WBBL Trophy: London Lions (2nd title)

Finals
- Champions: London Lions (2nd title)

WBBL seasons
- ← 2020–21 2022–23 →

The 2021–22 WBBL season will be the 8th season of the Women's British Basketball League, the top British women's professional basketball league, since its establishment in 2014. The season featured 13 teams from across England, Scotland and Wales.

== Teams ==
Team	Location	Arena	Head Coach
(Scotland) Caledonia Pride	Edinburgh	The Crags Centre	(Netherlands) Bart Sengers
(Wales) Cardiff Met Archers	Cardiff	Archers Arena	(United Kingdom) Stef Collins
(England) Durham Palatinates	Durham	Sports and Wellbeing Park	(United Kingdom) Lee Davie
(England) Essex Rebels	Colchester	Essex Sports Arena	(United Kingdom) Tom Sadler
(England) Gloucester City Queens	Gloucester	Oxstalls Arena	(United Kingdom) Jay Marriott
(England) Leicester Riders	Loughborough	Loughborough University	(United States) Derrick Washington
(England) London Lions	London (Barking)	Barking Abbey School	(United Kingdom) Mark Clark
(England) Manchester Met Mystics	Manchester	National Basketball Centre	(United States) Jeff Jones
(England) Newcastle Eagles	Newcastle upon Tyne	Eagles Community Arena	(United Kingdom) Chris Bunten
(England) Nottingham Wildcats	Nottingham	Nottingham Wildcats Arena	(United Kingdom) Kenrick Liburd
(England) Oaklands Wolves	St Albans	Oaklands College	(United Kingdom) Lauren Milligan
(England) Sevenoaks Suns	Sevenoaks	Sevenoaks Sports Centre	(United States) Len Busch
(England) Sheffield Hatters	Sheffield	All Saints Sports Centre	(United Kingdom) Vanessa Ellis

== WBBL Championship ==
Each team will play each other once home and once away for a 24-game regular season. The top 8 teams will qualify for the post-season playoffs.

=== Standings ===
Pos	Team	Pld	W	L	PF	PA	PD	Pts	Qualification
1	London Lions	24	24	0	2294	1305	+989	48	Qualification to playoffs
2	Sevenoaks Suns	24	21	3	1835	1349	+486	42	Qualification to playoffs
3	Sheffield Hatters	24	18	6	2029	1599	+430	36	Qualification to playoffs
4	Leicester Riders	24	14	10	1800	1667	+133	28	Qualification to playoffs
5	Nottingham Wildcats	24	12	12	1880	1873	+7	24	Qualification to playoffs
6	Caledonia Pride	24	12	12	1639	1721	−82	24	Qualification to playoffs
7	Essex Rebels	24	12	12	1862	1752	+110	24	Qualification to playoffs
8	Durham Palatinates	24	11	13	1610	1712	−102	22	Qualification to playoffs
9	Manchester Met Mystics	24	11	13	1573	1788	−215	22	
10	Newcastle Eagles	24	7	17	1477	1731	−254	14	
11	Cardiff Met Archers	24	6	18	1592	1865	−273	12	
12	Oaklands Wolves	24	5	19	1390	1854	−464	10	
13	Gloucester City Queens	24	3	21	1344	2109	−765	6	

Source: WBBL

== WBBL Playoffs ==
Quarter-finals

1 May 2022

Leicester Riders	69–81	Nottingham Wildcats

1 May 2022

Sheffield Hatters	77–86	Caledonia Pride

1 May 2022

Sevenoaks Suns	66–55	Essex Rebels

30 Apr 2022

London Lions	92–34	Durham Palatinates

Semi-finals

7 May 2022

Sevenoaks Suns	66–64	Nottingham Wildcats

8 May 2022

London Lions	104–59	Caledonia Pride

Final

15 May 2022

London Lions	70–45	Sevenoaks Suns

== WBBL Cup ==
The 2021-22 WBBL Cup featured all 13 teams, split into four geographical groups. Each group was played at a central venue hosted by one of the teams in the group. The winner of each group would advance to the semi-finals.

Qualification Stage

Group A

Pos	Team	Pld	W	L	PF	PA	PD	Pts	Qualification
1	Newcastle Eagles	2	2	0	164	97	+67	4	Qualification to semi-finals
2	Durham Palatinates	2	1	1	124	122	+2	2	
3	Caledonia Pride	2	0	2	92	161	−69	0	

Source: WBBL

Group B

Pos	Team	Pld	W	L	PF	PA	PD	Pts	Qualification
1	Sheffield Hatters	2	2	0	193	105	+88	4	Qualification to semi-finals
2	Manchester Met Mystics	2	1	1	133	164	−31	2	
3	Nottingham Wildcats	2	0	2	118	175	−57	0	

Source: WBBL

Group C

Pos	Team	Pld	W	L	PF	PA	PD	Pts	Qualification
1	Leicester Riders	3	3	0	215	140	+75	6	Qualification to semi-finals
2	Cardiff Met Archers	3	2	1	195	199	−4	4	
3	Gloucester City Queens	3	1	2	188	228	−40	2	
4	Oaklands Wolves	3	0	3	170	201	−31	0	

Source: WBBL

Group D

Pos	Team	Pld	W	L	PF	PA	PD	Pts	Qualification
1	London Lions	2	2	0	164	128	+36	4	Qualification to semi-finals
2	Sevenoaks Suns	2	1	1	155	140	+15	2	
3	Essex Rebels	2	0	2	111	162	−51	0	

Source: WBBL

Semi-finals

20 Nov 2021

Leicester Riders	66–100	London Lions

4 Dec 2021

Newcastle Eagles	50–45	Leicester Riders

Final

30 Jan 2022

London Lions	87–47	Newcastle Eagles

== WBBL Trophy ==
The 2021-22 WBBL Trophy was a straight knockout competition featuring all thirteen clubs. The top 3 teams from the 2020-21 WBBL Championship (Sevenoaks Suns, Leicester Riders and London Lions) received a bye to the quarter-finals. The remaining teams were seeded based on their finishing positions in the 2020-21 WBBL Championship.

First round

15 Jan 2022

Nottingham Wildcats	90–83	Gloucester City Queens

15 Jan 2022

Manchester Met Mystics	74–73	Sheffield Hatters

8 Jan 2022

Essex Rebels	87–84	Caledonia Pride

15 Jan 2022

Newcastle Eagles	59–73	Durham Palatinates

15 Jan 2022

Oaklands Wolves	66–76	Cardiff Met Archers

Quarter-finals

5 Feb 2022

Leicester Riders	88–59	Durham Palatinates

6 Feb 2022

Nottingham Wildcats	117–82	Cardiff Met Archers

6 Feb 2022

Essex Rebels	71–86	Sevenoaks Suns

27 Feb 2022

London Lions	101–46	Manchester Met Mystics

Semi-finals

6 Mar 2022

Leicester Riders	57–74	Sevenoaks Suns

5 Mar 2022

London Lions	82–39	Nottingham Wildcats

Final

20 Mar 2022

Sevenoaks Suns	36–72	London Lions
