= 2020–21 Women's British Basketball League season =

2020–21 WBBL season
- League: WBBL
- Season: 2020–21
- Teams: 11

Regular season
- League: Sevenoaks Suns (3rd title)
- WBBL Cup: Leicester Riders (1st title)
- WBBL Trophy: London Lions (1st title)

Finals
- Champions: London Lions (1st title)

WBBL seasons
- ← 2019–20 2021–22 →

The 2020–21 WBBL season was the 7th season of the Women's British Basketball League, the top British women's professional basketball league, since its establishment in 2014. The season featured 11 teams from across England, Scotland and Wales.

== Teams ==
Team	Location	Arena	Head Coach
(Scotland) Caledonia Pride	Edinburgh	The Crags Centre	(Netherlands) Bart Sengers
(Wales) Cardiff Met Archers	Cardiff	Archers Arena	(United Kingdom) Stef Collins
(England) Durham Palatinates	Durham	Sports and Wellbeing Park	(United Kingdom) Lee Davie
(England) Essex Rebels	Colchester	Essex Sports Arena	(United Kingdom) Tom Sadler
(England) Leicester Riders	Loughborough	Loughborough University	(Sweden) Jesper Sundberg
(England) London Lions	London (Barking)	Barking Abbey School	(United Kingdom) Mark Clark
(England) Manchester Met Mystics	Manchester	National Basketball Centre	(United States) Jeff Jones
(England) Newcastle Eagles	Newcastle upon Tyne	Eagles Community Arena	(United Kingdom) Chris Bunten
(England) Nottingham Wildcats	Nottingham	Nottingham Wildcats Arena	(United Kingdom) Kenrick Liburd
(England) Oaklands Wolves	St Albans	Oaklands College	(United Kingdom) Lee Ryan
(England) Sevenoaks Suns	Sevenoaks	Sevenoaks Sports Centre	(United States) Len Busch

== WBBL Championship ==
Each team played each other once home and once away for a 20-game regular season. The top 8 teams qualified for the post-season playoffs.

=== Standings ===
Pos	Team	Pld	W	L	PF	PA	PD	Pts	Qualification
1	Sevenoaks Suns (C)	20	19	1	1496	1180	+316	38	Qualification to playoffs
2	Leicester Riders	20	18	2	1518	1142	+376	36	Qualification to playoffs
3	London Lions	20	16	4	1740	1418	+322	32	Qualification to playoffs
4	Nottingham Wildcats	20	11	9	1444	1354	+90	22	Qualification to playoffs
5	Manchester Met Mystics	20	10	10	1429	1425	+4	20	Qualification to playoffs
6	Essex Rebels	20	10	10	1395	1452	−57	20	Qualification to playoffs
7	Newcastle Eagles	20	7	13	1387	1494	−107	14	Qualification to playoffs
8	Oaklands Wolves	20	7	13	1299	1406	−107	14	Qualification to playoffs
9	Cardiff Met Archers	20	5	15	1245	1484	−239	10	
10	Durham Palatinates	20	4	16	1238	1520	−282	8	
11	Caledonia Pride	20	3	17	1220	1536	−316	6	

Updated to match(es) played on 28 April 2021. Source: WBBL
(C) Champions

== WBBL Playoffs ==
=== Quarter-finals ===
1 May 2021

Sevenoaks Suns	76–59	Oaklands Wolves

1 May 2021

Leicester Riders	73–79	Newcastle Eagles

2 May 2021

Nottingham Wildcats	80–64	Manchester Met Mystics

2 May 2021

London Lions	92–65	Essex Rebels

=== Semi-finals ===
7 May 2021

Sevenoaks Suns	72–79	Newcastle Eagles

7 May 2021

London Lions	77–68	Nottingham Wildcats

=== Final ===
16 May 2021
15:00

London Lions	93–71	Newcastle Eagles
Scoring by quarter: 21-16, 24-21, 24-18, 24-16
Pts: S Beckford-Norton 30; Rebs: K Leonard 10; Asts: K Leonard 12		Pts: A Gorrell 30; Rebs: A Gorrell 9 Asts: A Gorrell 5

Morningside Arena, Leicester

== WBBL Cup ==
The 2020-21 WBBL Cup was held at the start of the season. Caledonia Pride, Durham Palatinates and Essex Rebels did not participate. The remaining clubs were split into two regional groups, playing each other once home or away. The top two teams from each group advanced to the semi-finals. Leicester Riders won their first WBBL Cup title, defeating Sevenoaks Suns in the final.

=== Qualification Stage ===
North

Pos	Team	Pld	W	L	PF	PA	PD	Pts	Qualification
1	Leicester Riders	3	3	0	222	165	+57	6	Qualification to semi-finals
2	Nottingham Wildcats	3	2	1	213	187	+26	4	Qualification to semi-finals
3	Newcastle Eagles	3	1	2	200	228	−28	2	
4	Manchester Met Mystics	3	0	3	189	244	−55	0	

Source: WBBL

South

Pos	Team	Pld	W	L	PF	PA	PD	Pts	Qualification
1	Sevenoaks Suns	3	3	0	155	110	+45	6	Qualification to semi-finals
2	Cardiff Met Archers	3	1	2	121	133	−12	2	Qualification to semi-finals
3	London Lions	3	1	2	128	141	−13	2	
4	Oaklands Wolves	3	1	2	20	40	−20	2	

Source: WBBL

=== Semi-finals ===
5 December 2020

Sevenoaks Suns	69–67	Nottingham Wildcats

5 December 2020

Leicester Riders	67–27	Cardiff Met Archers

=== Final ===
12 February 2021	Sevenoaks Suns	67–78	Leicester Riders	National Basketball Centre, Manchester
17:30
	Pts: J Monakana 25; Rebs: T Clark 14; Asts: C Carr 6	boxscore	Pts: K Oliver 18; Rebs: K Oliver 14; Asts: H Winterburn 8

== WBBL Trophy ==
The 2020-21 WBBL Trophy was a straight knockout competition featuring all eleven clubs. One match was forfeited (London vs. Sevenoaks) due to COVID-related player isolations. London Lions won their first WBBL Trophy title, defeating Nottingham Wildcats in the final.

=== First round ===
20 January 2021

London Lions	83–69	Essex Rebels

17 February 2021

Caledonia Pride	64–90	Manchester Met Mystics

17 February 2021

Cardiff Met Archers	52–61	Oaklands Wolves

=== Quarter-finals ===
21 February 2021

Leicester Riders	81–57	Oaklands Wolves

25 February 2021

Newcastle Eagles	53–76	Manchester Met Mystics

3 March 2021

Nottingham Wildcats	75–41	Durham Palatinates

3 March 2021

London Lions	20–0	Sevenoaks Suns

=== Semi-finals ===
6 March 2021

Leicester Riders	58–73	London Lions

13 March 2021

Manchester Met Mystics	75–90	Nottingham Wildcats

=== Final ===
21 March 2021	Nottingham Wildcats	64–96	London Lions	Worcester Arena, Worcester
17:30
	Pts: C Shumpert 27; Rebs: P Egharevba 10; Asts: T Freeman 5	boxscore	Pts: C Breen 25; Rebs: C Charles 8 Asts: K Leonard 9
