= Super League Basketball (women) =

Top women's basketball competition in Great Britain

- Founded: 2024; 2 years ago
- First season: 2024–25
- Country: Great Britain
- Federation: British Basketball
- Confederation: FIBA Europe (Europe)
- Number of teams: 10
- Level on pyramid: 1
- Domestic cup: Betty Codona Trophy
- International cup(s): EuroLeague Women; EuroCup Women
- Current champions: Sheffield Hatters (1st title) (2024–25)
- Most championships: Sheffield Hatters (1 title)
- TV partners: YouTube
- Website: SuperLeagueBasketballW.co.uk
- 2025–26 Women's Super League Basketball season

Super League Basketball (SLB) is a women's professional basketball league. Established in 2024, the competition replaces the former Women's British Basketball League (WBBL) as the top-level women's basketball competition in Great Britain. It also runs a knockout competition featuring all SLB member teams - the Betty Codona Trophy.

== History ==
The former WBBL was officially approved by the British Basketball League and England Basketball. It was announced to on 5 June 2014, and the 2014–15 season was the league's first full season of competition. On 3 September 2024, it was announced that it would be rebranded under the Super League Basketball umbrella and sit alongside the men's competition.

The Durham Palatinates decided not to continue into the 2025–26 season and as such the league continued with 10 teams.

== Teams ==
=== Current teams ===
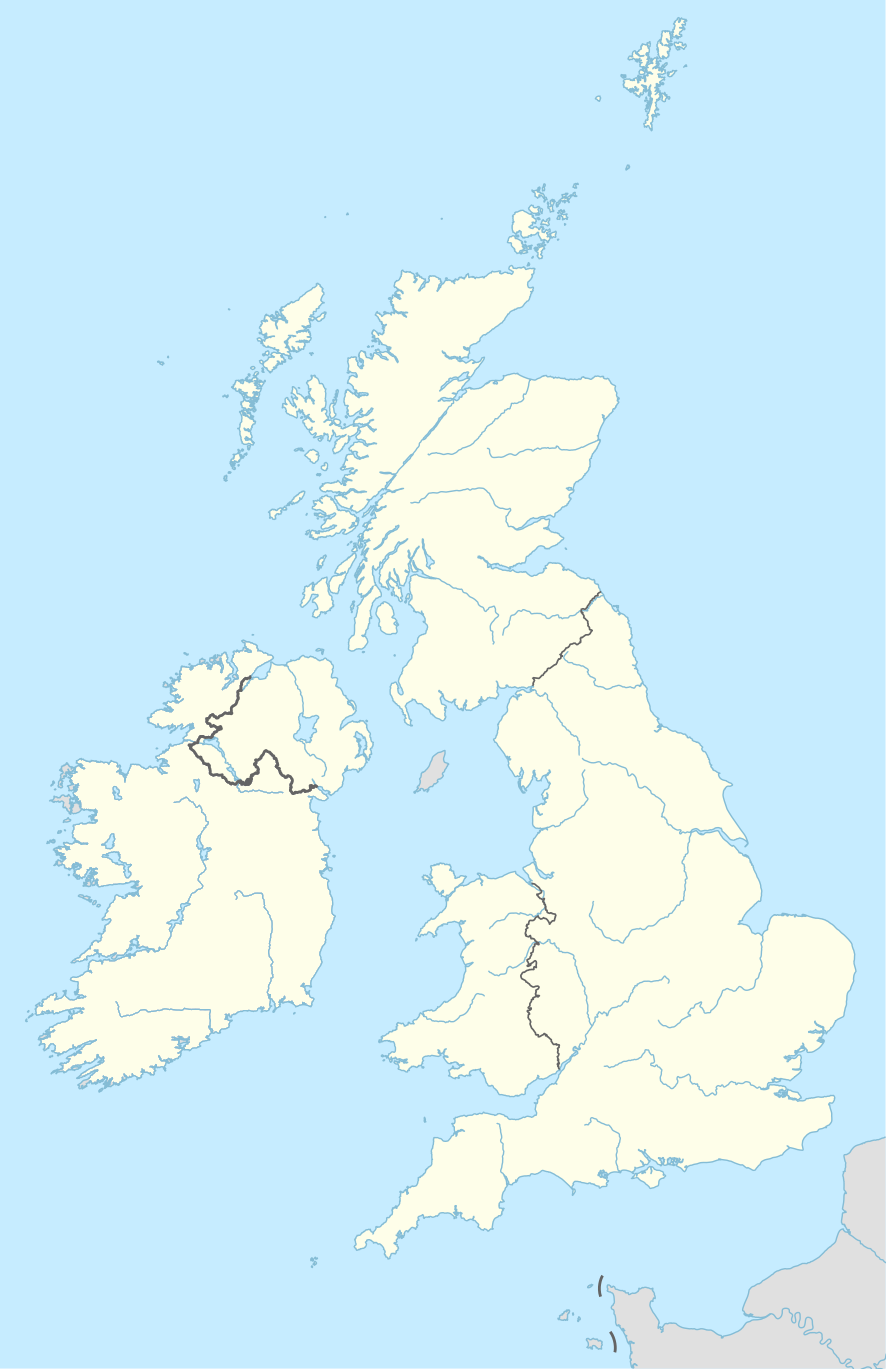
Locations of the current 2026–27 SLB teams

Team	Location	Arena	Founded	Joined	Head coach
(Scotland) Caledonia Gladiators	East Kilbride	Playsport Arena	2016	2024	(United Kingdom) Chantelle Handy
(Wales) Cardiff Met Archers	Cardiff	Archers Arena	2000	2024	(United Kingdom) Stef Collins
(England) Essex Rebels	Colchester	Essex Sports Arena	2018	2024	(United Kingdom) Ashley Cookson
(England) Leicester Riders	Loughborough	Loughborough University	2011	2024	(United Kingdom) Ben Stanley
(England) London Lions	London (Stratford)	Copper Box Arena	2008	2024	(United Kingdom) Dan Petts
(England) Manchester Basketball	Manchester	National Basketball Centre	2024	2024	(United Kingdom) Rheanne Bailey
(England) Newcastle Eagles	Newcastle	Vertu Motors Arena	2005	2024	(United Kingdom) Chloe Gaynor
(England) Nottingham Wildcats	Nottingham	Nottingham Wildcats Arena	1976	2024	(United Kingdom) Karen Burton
(England) Oaklands Wolves	St Albans	Oaklands College	2009	2024	(United Kingdom) Lee Ryan
(England) Sheffield Hatters	Sheffield	Canon Medical Arena	1961	2024	(United Kingdom) Vanessa Ellis

=== Previous Teams ===
Team	Location	Arena	Founded	Joined	Last Season
(England) Durham Palatinates	Durham	Sports and Wellbeing Park	2017	2024	2024–25

== Corporate Structure ==
Jim Saker (2024–Present)

== See also ==
- Women's British Basketball League (2014–2024)
- English Women's Basketball League
- Scottish Basketball Championship Women
- Super League Basketball
- British Basketball League (1987–2024)
