= Women's British Basketball League =

Professional women's basketball league in the United Kingdom

Women's British Basketball League (WBBL)
- Founded: 5 June 2014; 12 years ago
- First season: 2014–15
- Folded: 2023–24
- Replaced by: Super League Basketball
- Country: Great Britain
- Federation: British Basketball
- Confederation: FIBA Europe
- Number of teams: See more
- Level on pyramid: 1
- Domestic cup(s): WBBL Cup; WBBL Trophy
- Related competitions: British Basketball League (men's counterpart)
- Last champions: London Lions (2nd title)
- Most championships: Sevenoaks Suns (3 titles)
- TV partners: BBC Sport
- Website: WBBL.org.uk

The Women's British Basketball League (WBBL) was the top-level women's basketball league in Great Britain, founded on 5 June 2014 as the women's counterpart to the British Basketball League (BBL). The league's headquarters sat in Leicester alongside the offices of the men's BBL. It was replaced by Super League Basketball like the men’s competition.

Like the BBL, the organisation used a franchise-based system so there is no promotion and relegation between the WBBL and the English Women's Basketball League, which forms the lower divisions. Along with the WBBL Championship and the post-season Play-offs, it also ran two knockout competitions featuring all WBBL member teams - the WBBL Cup and WBBL Trophy.

== History ==
Officially approved by the British Basketball League and England Basketball, the newly created Women's British Basketball League was announced to the public on 5 June 2014, and the 2014–15 season was the league's first full season of competition.

The initial line-up included pre-existing teams from England and Wales, competing in a franchise-based organisation similar to the men's British Basketball League model, with no promotion or relegation in operation with the lower leagues. All eight teams from the pre-existing English Basketball League Division One (Women) competition were selected as member clubs, as well as the two finalists from the 2014 Division Two (Women) Play-offs, Brixton Lady TopCats and Leeds Beckett University. Since the league's inauguration, both Leeds and Brixton have resigned from the league, but three new clubs have joined in that time, including the league's first member club from Scotland.

== Teams ==
Team	Location	Arena	Founded	Joined	Head Coach
(Scotland) Caledonia Gladiators	East Kilbride	Playsport Arena	2016	2016	(Spain) Miguel Ángel Ortega Marco
(Wales) Cardiff Met Archers	Cardiff	Archers Arena	2000	2014	(United Kingdom) Stef Collins
(England) Durham Palatinates	Durham	Sports and Wellbeing Park	2017	2017	
(England) Essex Rebels	Colchester	Essex Sports Arena	2018	2018	(United Kingdom) Ashley Cookson
(England) Leicester Riders	Loughborough	Loughborough University	2011	2014	(United Kingdom) Ben Stanley
(England) London Lions	London (Stratford)	Copper Box Arena	2008	2014	(Greece) Styliani Kaltsidou
(England) Manchester Giants	Manchester	National Basketball Centre	2004	2014	(United States) Marg Jones
(England) Newcastle Eagles	Newcastle upon Tyne	Vertu Motors Arena	2005	2014	(Spain) Noelia Cacheiro
(England) Nottingham Wildcats	Nottingham	Nottingham Wildcats Arena	1976	2014	(United Kingdom) Karen Burton
(England) Oaklands Wolves	St Albans	Oaklands College	2009	2016	
(England) Sheffield Hatters	Sheffield	All Saints Sports Centre	1961	2021	(United Kingdom) Vanessa Ellis

=== Former teams ===
Team	Location	Arena	Joined	Left
(England) Leeds Beckett University	Leeds	Carnegie Sports Arena	2014	2015
(England) Brixton Lady TopCats	London (Brixton)	Brixton Recreation Centre	2014	2016
(England) Gloucester City Queens	Gloucester	Oxstalls Arena	2021	2022
(England) Sevenoaks Suns	Sevenoaks (Guildford)	Surrey Sports Park	2014	2023

Locations of the current WBBL teams

== Competitions ==
=== WBBL Championship ===
The WBBL Championship is the flagship competition of the Women's British Basketball League and features all member teams playing a 22-game regular season (in a round robin format), from October through to April. Matches are played according to FIBA rules and games consist of four-quarters of 10 minutes each. Two points are awarded for a win, with overtime used if the score is tied at the final buzzer – unlimited numbers of 5-minute overtime periods are played until one team is ahead when a period ends. At the end of the regular season, the team with the most points is crowned as WBBL Champions. If points are equal between two or more teams then head-to-head results between said teams are used to determine the winners. In the case of a tie between multiple teams where this does not break the tie, the winners are then determined by the points difference in the games between said teams. Following the completion of the Championship regular season, the top eight ranked teams advance into the post-season Play-offs which usually take place during April.

Season	Champions	Runners Up	Third Place
2014–15	Sheffield Hatters (1)	Nottingham Wildcats	Team Northumbria
2015–16	Nottingham Wildcats (1)	Team Northumbria	Sheffield Hatters
2016–17	Nottingham Wildcats (2)	Leicester Riders	Sevenoaks Suns
2017–18	Sevenoaks Suns (1)	Leicester Riders	Sheffield Hatters
2018–19	Sevenoaks Suns (2)	Leicester Riders	Sheffield Hatters
2019–20	Season cancelled due to COVID-19 pandemic		
2020–21	Sevenoaks Suns (3)	Leicester Riders	London Lions
2021–22	London Lions (1)	Sevenoaks Suns	Sheffield Hatters
2022–23	London Lions (2)	Caledonia Gladiators	Leicester Riders

=== WBBL Playoffs ===
The post-season Playoffs usually takes place in April, featuring the top eight ranked teams from the WBBL Championship regular season compete in a knockout tournament. Teams are seeded depending on their final positioning in the Championship standings, so first-place faces eighth-place, second versus seventh-place, third against sixth-place and finally fourth plays the fifth-placed team. Both the Quarter-finals and the succeeding Semi-finals are played over a two-game series (home & away) with the higher seed having choice of home advantage in the either the 1st or 2nd leg – an aggregated score over the two games will determine which team will advance to the next stage. As with the Quarter-finals, teams in the Semi-finals are also seeded, with the highest-ranking team drawn against the lowest-ranking team in one Semi-final and the two remaining teams drawn together in the other Semi-final. The culmination of the post-season is the grand Final, a one-off game played at the end of April, where the winners will be crowned as Play-off Champions.

Season	Champions	Result	Runners Up	Venue
2014–15	Sheffield Hatters (1)	84 - 69	Nottingham Wildcats	Worcester Arena, Worcester
2015–16	Team Northumbria (1)	75 - 68	Nottingham Wildcats	The O2 Arena, London
2016–17	Sevenoaks Suns (1)	70 - 61	Nottingham Wildcats	The O2 Arena, London
2017–18	Sevenoaks Suns (2)	69 - 44	Leicester Riders	The O2 Arena, London
2018–19	Sevenoaks Suns (3)	60 - 55	Leicester Riders	The O2 Arena, London
2019–20	Season cancelled due to COVID-19 pandemic			
2020–21	London Lions (1)	93 - 71	Newcastle Eagles	Morningside Arena, Leicester
2021–22	London Lions (2)	70 - 45	Sevenoaks Suns	The O2 Arena, London
2022–23	London Lions (3)	57 - 41	Leicester Riders	The O2 Arena, London

=== Betty Codona Trophy ===
The WBBL Trophy, now officially the Betty Codona Trophy, is an annual pool stage and knockout tournament featuring all WBBL member clubs.

For the first two seasons, pairings were drawn completely at random – there were no seeds, and a draw took place after the majority of fixtures have been played in each round. A preliminary round took place between the lowest-finishing teams in the previous league season, so that the tournament proper started with eight teams in the first round.

From the 2016-17 season, the format was revamped, splitting the teams into a number of geographical groups. The top teams from each group qualify for the semi-finals, which are played as straight knockout ties.

Season	Champions	Result	Runners Up	Venue
2014–15	Sheffield Hatters (1)	76 - 62	Nottingham Wildcats	Barclaycard Arena, Birmingham
2015–16	Sheffield Hatters (2)	79 - 45	Barking Abbey Crusaders	Barclaycard Arena, Birmingham
2016–17	Sevenoaks Suns (1)	82 - 67	Leicester Riders	Emirates Arena, Glasgow
2017–18	Leicester Riders (1)	68 - 53	Sevenoaks Suns	Cheshire Oaks Arena, Ellesmere Port
2018–19	Leicester Riders (2)	76 - 74	Durham Palatinates	Emirates Arena, Glasgow
2019–20	Leicester Riders (3)	70 - 66	Durham Palatinates	Emirates Arena, Glasgow
2020–21	London Lions (1)	96 - 64	Nottingham Wildcats	Worcester Arena, Worcester
2021–22	London Lions (2)	72 - 36	Sevenoaks Suns	Emirates Arena, Glasgow
2022–23	London Lions (3)	81 - 70	Leicester Riders	Emirates Arena, Glasgow
2023–24	London Lions (4)	83 - 67	Essex Rebels	Utilita Arena, Birmingham

=== WBBL Cup ===
The WBBL Cup is an annual knockout competition featuring all WBBL member clubs. It is a straight knockout competition.

Season	Champions	Result	Runners Up	Venue
2016–17	Manchester Mystics (1)	71 - 60	Nottingham Wildcats	Barclaycard Arena, Birmingham
2017–18	Nottingham Wildcats (1)	70 - 66	Caledonia Pride	Arena Birmingham, Birmingham
2018–19	Sheffield Hatters (1)	62 - 60	Sevenoaks Suns	Arena Birmingham, Birmingham
2019–20	Sevenoaks Suns (1)	74 - 64	Durham Palatinates	Arena Birmingham, Birmingham
2020–21	Leicester Riders (1)	78 - 67	Sevenoaks Suns	National Basketball Centre, Manchester
2021–22	London Lions (1)	87 - 47	Newcastle Eagles	Arena Birmingham, Birmingham
2022–23	London Lions (2)	95 - 42	Leicester Riders	Arena Birmingham, Birmingham
2023–24				

=== Betty Codona Classic ===
The Betty Codona Classic was an annual three-day tournament named in honour of Betty Codona OBE, a stalwart of women's basketball in Britain for over 50 years and founder of the country's first women's team, Sheffield Hatters. The competition was originally set up as an independent event for the top clubs in Women's basketball and predates the creation of the WBBL by a year, but was adopted as an official WBBL competition after the league was established.

The original format featured the top eight-placed WBBL teams after the first 8 games of regular season play. For the 2016/2017 edition, the competition was moved to become the opening event for the WBBL season, resulting in a two-tiered format where the Classic Cup was contested by the top four from the previous season's league, with fifth to eighth placed teams from last year's league competing for the Classic Plate.

Season	Champions	Result	Runners Up	Venue
2013–14	Nottingham Wildcats (1)	69 - 43	Loughborough Riders	Nottingham Wildcats Arena
2014–15	Sheffield Hatters (1)	79 - 73	Nottingham Wildcats	All Saints Sports Centre, Sheffield
2015–16	Nottingham Wildcats (2)	89 - 81	Sheffield Hatters	All Saints Sports Centre, Sheffield
2016–17	Nottingham Wildcats (3)	86 - 59	Sheffield Hatters	Nottingham Wildcats Arena

== Individual awards ==
The WBBL concludes each season with a number of individual awards based on overall performance from the year. The three end-of-season awards are; MVP Award (Most Valuable Player - which proposes the player with the best performance over the year); the Young Player of the Year (the best performance of a younger player usually at the age before or during university); and Coach of the Year (the coach with the best performance over the season). The WBBL also awards MVP Awards for the Playoffs, Trophy and Cup finals. In addition, 'Team of the Year' and 'Defensive Team of the Year' places are awarded to demonstrate the best five players in the league as well as the best five defensively players of the year in the league.

Season	Most Valuable Player	Young Player of the Year	Coach of the Season
2014–15	Steph Gandy (Sheffield Hatters)	Savannah Wilkinson (Barking Abbey Crusaders)	Vanessa Ellis (Sheffield Hatters)
2015–16	Amber Stokes (Nottingham Wildcats)	Georgia Gayle (Sheffield Hatters)	Dave Greenaway (Nottingham Wildcats)
2016–17	Ashley Harris (Nottingham Wildcats)	Gabby Nikitinaite (Sevenoaks Suns)	Len Busch (Sevenoaks Suns)
2017–18	Cat Carr (Sevenoaks Suns)	Holly Winterburn (Leicester Riders)	Len Busch (2) (Sevenoaks Suns)
2018–19	Sarah Toeiana (Sheffield Hatters)	Holly Winterburn (2) (Leicester Riders)	Len Busch (3) (Sevenoaks Suns)
2019–20	Not awarded due to Covid-19	Not awarded due to Covid-19	Not awarded due to Covid-19
2020–21	Cat Carr (2) (Sevenoaks Suns)	Holly Winterburn (3) (Leicester Riders)	Len Busch (4) (Sevenoaks Suns)

== See also ==
- Basketball in England
- British Basketball League
- English Women's Basketball League
- Women's Super League, the Irish equivalent; includes teams from Northern Ireland
