= Belle Vue, Manchester =

Area of Manchester, England

Coordinates: 53.4652°N 2.1875°W

Belle Vue
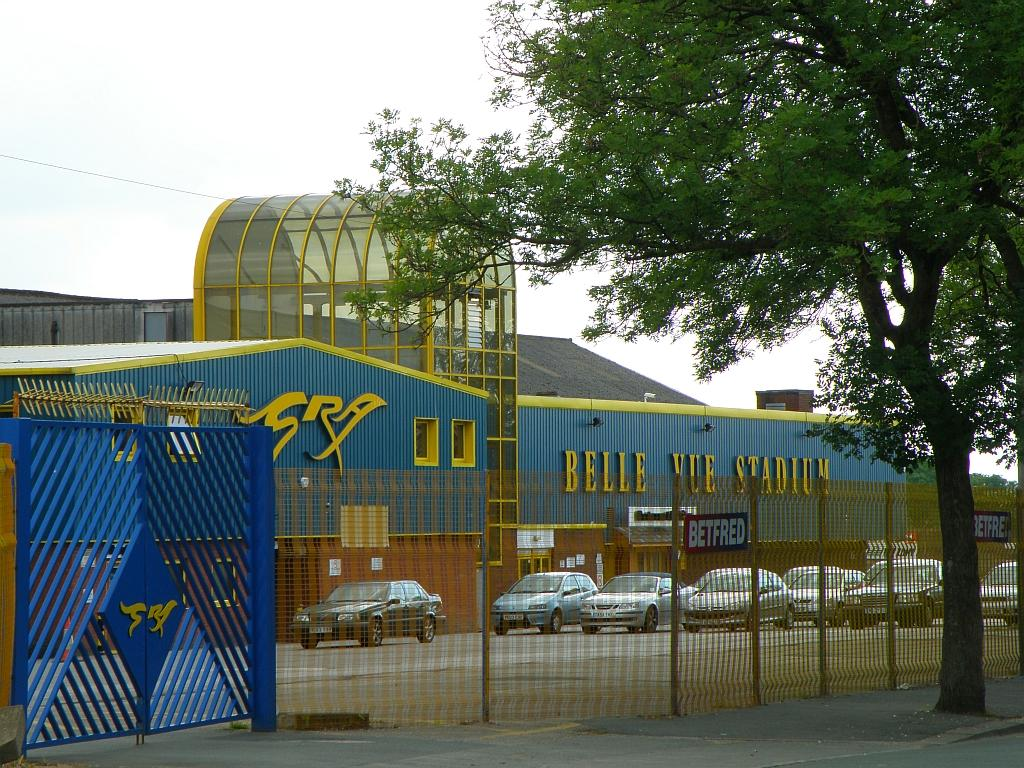
- Frontage of Belle Vue Stadium, 2009

- Location within Greater Manchester
- OS grid reference: SJ875965
- Metropolitan borough: Manchester
- Metropolitan county: Greater Manchester
- Region: North West
- Country: England
- Sovereign state: United Kingdom
- Post town: MANCHESTER
- Postcode district: M18
- Dialling code: 0161
- Police: Greater Manchester
- Fire: Greater Manchester
- Ambulance: North West
- UK Parliament: Gorton and Denton

Belle Vue is an area of Manchester, England, sited east of the city centre; it is bordered by the Hope Valley Line to the east and the Glossop line to the west. It is part of the electoral ward of Longsight.

== History ==
In 1897, the machine tool manufacturer Kendall and Gent opened its Victoria Works in Belle Vue. The company closed down in the late 1960s.

The area is best known for the former Belle Vue Zoological Gardens and Belle Vue Stadium. The zoo opened in 1836 and a small amusements area was added in the 1870s, which developed into a major amusement park in the 20th century. It occupied a 96-acre site and, at the height of its popularity, attracted two million visitors annually. In 1910, the Kings Hall was opened which housed The Hallé for several years, hosting major concerts over the years. The zoo closed in September 1977, due to mounting debts; the amusement park remained open on summer weekends until 1980. The land was sold in 1982 and the site was finally cleared in 1987.

== Sport ==
The National Basketball Performance Centre, headquarters of Basketball England, is located in Belle Vue. It the home arena of men's basketball team Manchester Giants, women's basketball team Manchester Mystics and women's netball team Manchester Thunder.

The National Speedway Stadium is home to the Belle Vue Aces speedway team.

== Transport ==
Belle Vue railway station lies on the Hope Valley Line.

On Mondays to Saturdays, Northern Trains operates an hourly service in each direction between Manchester Piccadilly and New Mills Central. There is no Sunday service.

Bus services are operated predominantly by Stagecoach Manchester, which link the area with Manchester Piccadilly, Gorton, Hattersley, Hyde, Stockport and the Trafford Centre.
