= Chantelle Handy =

British basketball player

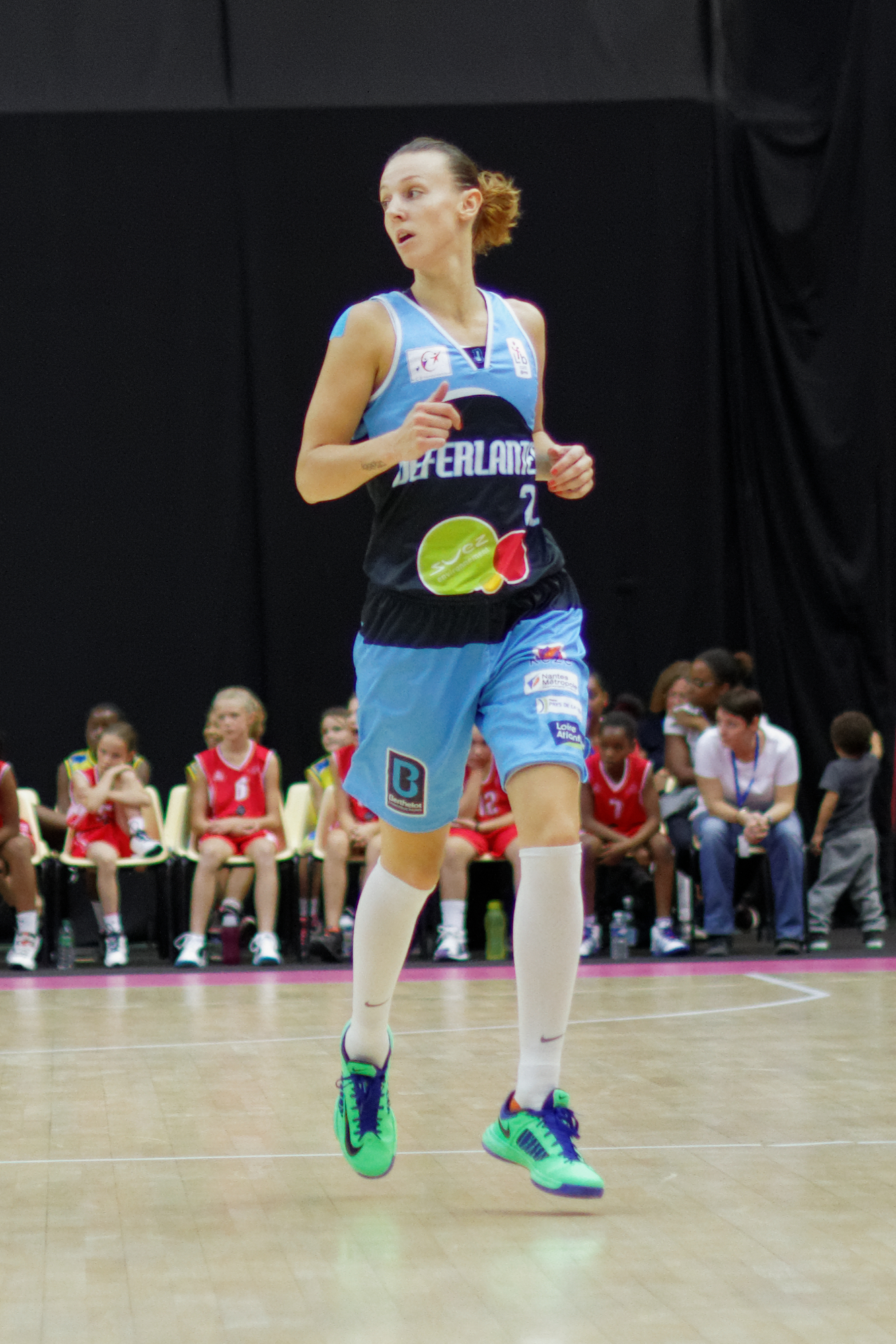
- Handy (2013)

No. 22 – Caledonia Gladiators
- Position: Forward
- League: WBBL

Personal information
- Born: 16 June 1987 (age 39) Consett, United Kingdom
- Listed height: 1.88 m (6 ft 2 in)

Career information
- High school: Prudhoe (Prudhoe, England); Mount de Chantal Academy (Wheeling, West Virginia)
- College: Marshall (2006–2010)
- Playing career: 2010–present

Career history
- 2011–2012: Athinaikos
- 2012–2013: Mersin
- 2013: Nantes
- 2014: Umea
- 2014: Orduspor
- 2015: Ormanspor
- 2015-2016: Pinkk Pecsi
- 2016-2017: Piestanske Cajky
- 2017: Team Northumbria
- 2018: Gdynia
- 2018–2019: Battipaglia
- 2019–2020: BC Castors Braine
- 2020–2021: Casademont Zaragoza
- 2021–2022: TTT Riga
- 2022–present: Caledonia Gladiators
Medals
Women's basketball
Representing England
Commonwealth Games
Silver medal – second place	2022 Birmingham	3x3

Chantelle Handy (born 16 June 1987) is a basketball player for Caledonia Gladiators of the WBBL. She has also played for the Great Britain national team and was part of the squad for the 2012 Summer Olympics. She played college basketball in the United States at Marshall University in Huntington, West Virginia.

== Marshall statistics ==
Legend
GP	Games played	GS	Games started	MPG	Minutes per game
FG%	Field goal percentage	3P%	3-point field goal percentage	FT%	Free throw percentage
RPG	Rebounds per game	APG	Assists per game	SPG	Steals per game
BPG	Blocks per game	PPG	Points per game	**Bold**	Career high

Year	Team	GP	Points	FG%	3P%	FT%	RPG	APG	SPG	BPG	PPG
2006-07	Marshall	30	133	33.9%	14.7%	52.2%	2.6	2.0	0.4	0.1	4.4
2007-08	Marshall	**33**	160	42.4%	0.0%	52.6%	5.2	1.4	0.5	0.1	4.8
2008-09	Marshall	32	**362**	**52.2%**	27.3%	**73.7%**	**5.5**	**2.5**	**0.8**	**0.3**	**11.3**
2009-10	Marshall	30	329	42.1%	**33.3%**	60.0%	5.3	2.2	0.7	0.3	11.0
Career		125	984	44.0%	25.5%	60.4%	4.7	2.0	0.6	0.2	7.9
