= Park Community Arena =

Sports venue in Sheffield, England

Coordinates: 53.3947°N 1.4255°W

- Canon Medical Arena
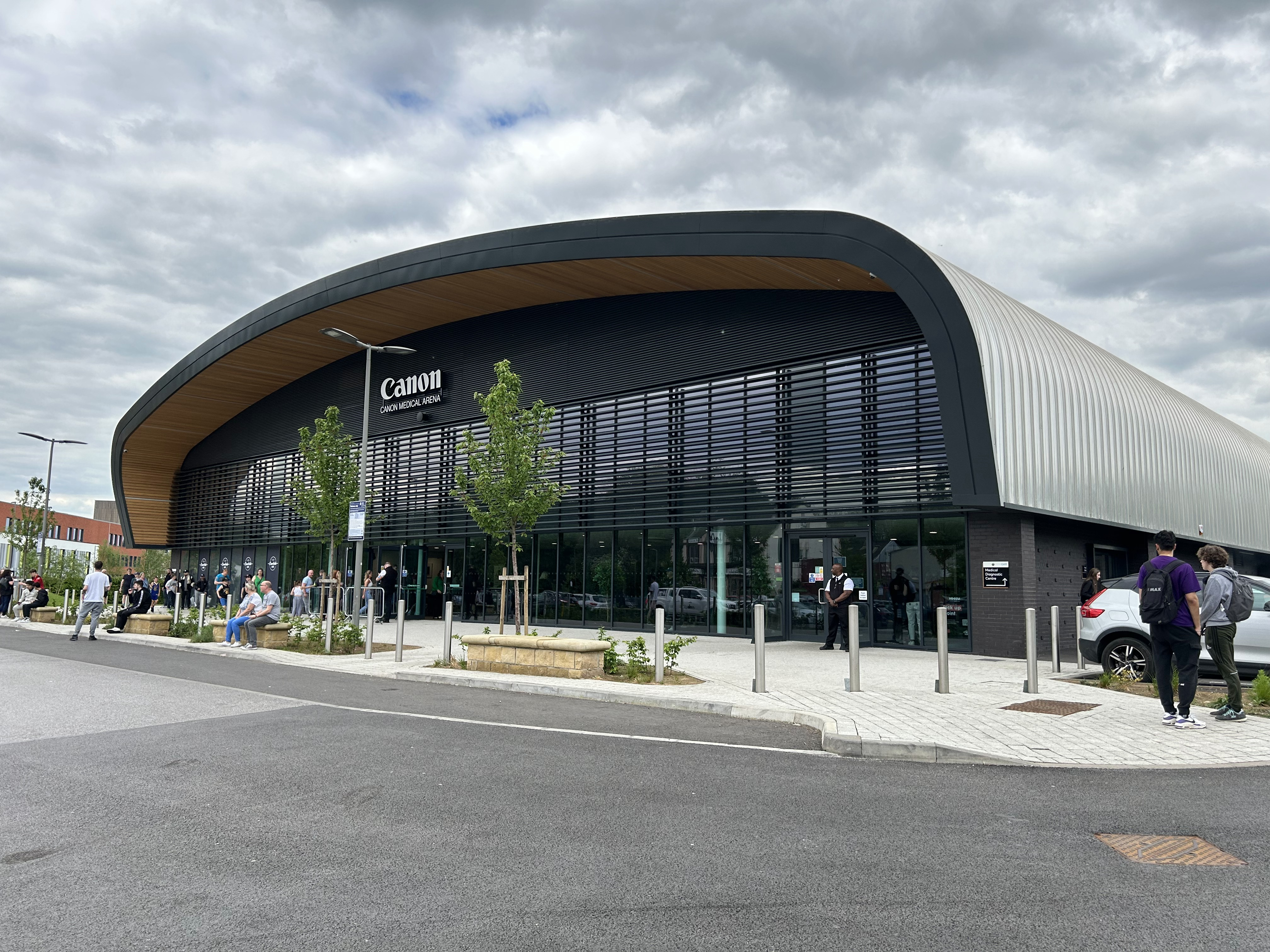
- Interactive map of Park Community Arena
- Location: Sheffield, England
- Owner: Park Community Arena Ltd; Canon Medical Systems
- Operator: PCA Ltd
- Capacity: Overall: 3,000; Basketball: 2,500
- Public transit: Y TT; Arena / Olympic Legacy Park

Construction
- Groundbreaking: 2022
- Opened: 5 October 2023
- Cost: £14 million

Tenants
- Sheffield Sharks; Sheffield Hatters

Website
- parkcommunityarena.co.uk

Park Community Arena, known for sponsorship reasons as Canon Medical Arena, is a sports arena located within the Sheffield Olympic Legacy Park in Sheffield, England. The arena's main tenants are the Sheffield Sharks and Sheffield Hatters basketball teams, who relocated from their previous homes at Ponds Forge and All Saints Sports Centre for the start of the 2023–24 season. The arena has a capacity of 2,500 seats for basketball matches.

== History ==
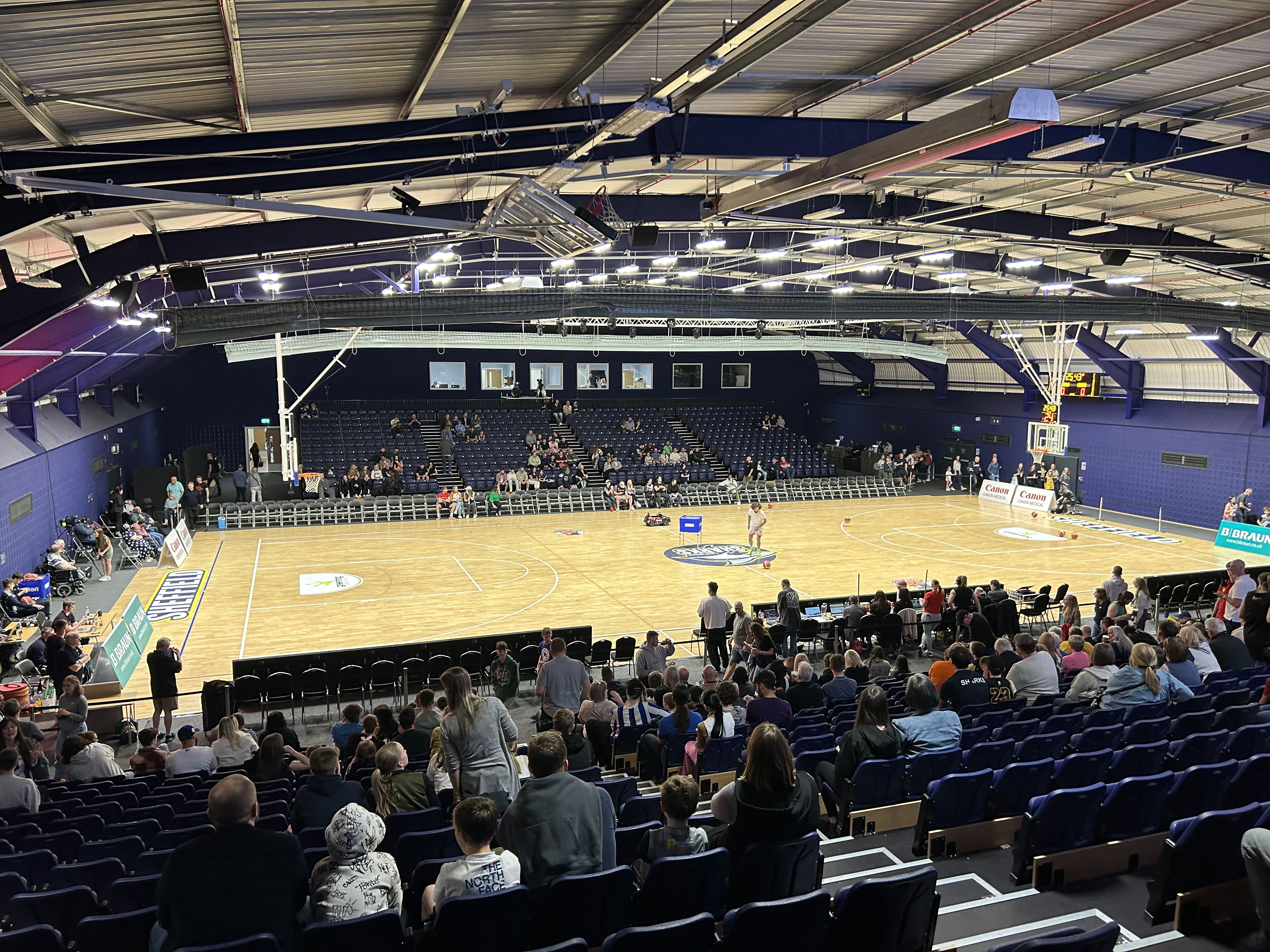
Interior view, from the North Stand, prior to a Sheffield Sharks game

Plans were in place for a 2,500 capacity basketball arena within the Sheffield Olympic Legacy Park on the site of the former Don Valley Stadium as far back as 2016. After subsequent delays and changes to the plans, the £14 million Park Community Arena, developed by Canon Medical Systems, broke ground in 2022.

A 10-year naming rights deal was confirmed in August 2023, with the facility officially branded as Canon Medical Arena until 2033. The arena officially opened on 5 October, with the first basketball match held on 8 October where a sell-out crowd saw Sheffield Sharks defeat Newcastle Eagles, 86–56. Two weeks later, Sheffield Hatters made their debut at the new venue with a match against Nottingham Wildcats on 22 October.
