= London Lions (women) =

English women's basketball team based in London

- League: SLB
- Founded: 2008; 18 years ago
- History: Barking Abbey; 2008–2014; Barking Abbey Crusaders; 2014–2017; BA London Lions; 2017–2020; London Lions; 2020–present
- Location: London
- Head coach: Kyla Nelson
- Team captain: Shanice Beckford-Norton
- Championships: 3 WBBL Championship; 4 WBBL Playoffs; 2 WBBL Cup; 4 WBBL Trophy; 1 EuroCup
- Website: Official website

The London Lions are an English women's basketball team based in Barking, London that compete in the Super League Basketball, the top league of British women's basketball.

== History ==
The team became part of the London Lions in 2017, when the WBBL team Barking Abbey Crusaders and men's professional team London Lions formed a partnership. The Lions won their first piece of silverware, the 2020-21 WBBL Trophy, defeating Nottingham Wildcats 96-64 in the final in Worcester.

In 2024, the Lions reached the 2023–24 EuroCup Women final, the first British team to do so, following a streak of 14 victories. On 10 April 2024, the Lions won their second leg against Beşiktaş and won the EuroCup title.

== Home venue ==
- Barking Abbey School (2008–present)
- Copper Box (2017–present)

== Season-by-season records ==
Season	Division	Tier	Regular Season						Post-Season	WBBL Trophy	WBBL Cup	Head coach
Season	Division	Tier	Finish	Played	Wins	Losses	Points	Win %	Post-Season	WBBL Trophy	WBBL Cup	Head coach
Barking Abbey
2009–10	NBL D1	1	5th	20	12	8	24	0.600	Semi-finals			
2010–11	NBL D1	1	7th	21	6	15	12	0.286	Did not qualify			
2011–12	NBL D1	1	3rd	21	13	8	26	0.619	Semi-finals			
2012–13	NBL D1	1	3rd	18	15	3	30	0.833	Runners-Up			
2013–14	NBL D1	1	8th	14	3	11	6	0.214	Did not qualify			
Barking Abbey Crusaders
2014–15	WBBL	1	6th	16	8	10	16	0.444	Semi-finals	1st round		
2015–16	WBBL	1	4th	16	8	8	16	0.500	Quarter-finals	Runners-Up		
2016–17	WBBL	1	7th	18	8	10	16	0.444	Quarter-finals	Pool Stage	Quarter-finals	
BA London Lions
2017–18	WBBL	1	11th	20	1	19	2	0.050	Did not qualify	Pool Stage	1st round	Mark Clark
2018–19	WBBL	1	9th	22	7	15	14	0.318	Did not qualify	Pool Stage	1st round	Mark Clark
2019–20	WBBL	1	Season cancelled due to COVID-19 pandemic							Pool Stage	1st round	Mark Clark
London Lions
2020–21	WBBL	1	3rd	20	16	4	32	0.800	Winners, beating Newcastle	Winners, beating Nottingham	Pool Stage	Mark Clark
2021–22	WBBL	1	1st	24	24	0	48	1.000	Winners, beating Sevenoaks	Winners, beating Sevenoaks	Winners, beating Newcastle	Mark Clark
2022–23	WBBL	1	1st	22	21	1	42	0.955	Winners, beating Leicester	Winners, beating Leicester	Winners, beating Leicester	Mark Clark; Styliani Kaltsidou
2023–24	WBBL	1	1st	20	20	0	40	1.000	Winners, beating Newcastle	Winners, beating Essex		Styliani Kaltsidou

== Players ==
=== Current roster ===
Note: Flags indicate national team, as has been defined under FIBA eligibility rules. Players may hold more than one non-FIBA nationality.

No.	Pos.	Nat.	Player
1	G	(United States) USA	Juicy Landrum
2	G	(Serbia) SRB	Ivana Katanic
3	G	(United Kingdom) GBR	Shanice Beckford-Norton
4	G	(United Kingdom) GBR	Katie Cox
5	C	(United Kingdom) GBR	Cheridene Green
6	F	(Belarus) BLR	Katsiaryna Snytsina
8	G	(United Kingdom) GBR	Faye Endean
9	G	(United Kingdom) GBR	Ruchae Walton
12	F	(United Kingdom) GBR	Savannah Wilkinson
20	G	(United Kingdom) GBR	Abby Meyers
21	F	(United Kingdom) GBR	Maya Price
	PG	(United Kingdom) GBR	Macy Spinks
	PF	(Canada) CAN	Mya Proctor
	PG	(United States) USA	Annika Shah
	SF	(United States) USA	Sara Ahmadpour
	SF	(United Kingdom) GBR	Yassin Belle
	SG	(United States) USA	Jada Lewis
	G	(United Kingdom) GBR	Shantell Ayton
	F	(United Kingdom) GBR	Deborah Somoye
	G	(United Kingdom) GBR	Esther Oluade

=== Notable players ===
Note: Flags indicate national team, as has been defined under FIBA eligibility rules. Players may hold more than one non-FIBA nationality.

Criteria

To appear in this section a player must have either:

- Set a club record or won an individual award while at the club.
- Played at least one official international match for their national team at any time.

- (United Kingdom) Holly Winterburn
- (United Kingdom) Karlie Samuelson
- (Belarus) Katsiaryna Snytsina
- (Nigeria) Temi Fagbenle
- (Spain) Megan DiLeo
- (Sweden) Paulina Hersler
- (United States) Abby Meyers

== Honours ==
EuroCup Women

- Winners (1): 2023–24

WBBL Championship

- Winners (3): 2021–22, 2022–23, 2023–24

WBBL Playoffs

- Winners (4): 2020–21, 2021–22, 2022–23, 2023–24

WBBL Trophy

- Winners (4): 2020–21, 2021–22, 2022–23, 2023–24

WBBL Cup

- Winners (2): 2021–22, 2022–23

== See also ==
- Barking Abbey Basketball Academy
- London Lions (basketball)
