= English Women's Basketball League =

UK sports league

- Sport: Basketball
- Founded: 2003
- First season: 2003/04
- No. of teams: 26
- Country: England
- Continent: FIBA Europe (Europe)
- Most recent champion: Anglia Ruskin University
- Level on pyramid: 2
- Domestic cup: 1
- Website: basketballengland.co.uk

The Women's National Basketball League (WNBL) is a women's basketball league in England, covering semi-professional and amateur levels of the game. This is effectively seen as the second tier of women's basketball in the United Kingdom, along with the less celebrated Scottish Women's National League.

The EBL was established in 2003 by Basketball England to replace the former National Basketball League, which the league has since reverted to at the start of the 2015/2016 season, and currently operates three women's leagues in a regionalised structure, as well as the men's National Basketball League. The senior leagues are supported by a junior structure for both male and female players, with leagues for under-18s, under-16s and under-14s.

The NBL Leagues form the second and third level of women's competition in the United Kingdom, with the highest level consisting of the semi-professional Women's British Basketball League. There is no promotion and relegation between the National League and the Women's British Basketball League, which operates a franchise system, although teams seeking greater competition and exposure can apply to make the step from NBL to the WBBL.

== History ==
When it was founded in 2003, the women's EBL consisted of two levels of competition; a nationalized Division 1, closely matching the WNBL Conference which existed under the previous structure, and a regionalized Division 2, originally split into North and South conferences. At this point, there was no level of competition above Division 1, nor any competition for clubs on a British level. From the 2007/2008 season onwards, Division 2 was split into three regions to allow for the greater number of clubs applying for national competition.

In 2014, England Basketball and the British Basketball League collaborated to form the Women's British Basketball League, which absorbed many of the largest women's clubs in the NBL, including the whole of Division 1. As a result, the most established and successful clubs in women's basketball in the United Kingdom are no longer part of the NBL. Initially, the NBL's women's leagues retained the original regionalised structure of the old Division 2, which meant only the end-of-season playoffs offering the opportunity for clubs from across the whole of England to compete against each other. A nationalised Division 1 was reinstated for the 2016/2017 season, with the new Division 2 split across a North/South divide.

== Teams ==
WNBL Division 1 League for the 2020/2021 season.

=== Division 1 ===
Team	Arena
Anglia Ruskin University	Kelsey Kerridge Sports Centre
Barking Abbey UEL	Barking Abbey Leisure Centre
Bristol Academy Flyers	SGS Arena
Cardiff Met Archers II	Archers Arena
Ipswich Basketball Club	Copleston Sports Centre
Loughborough Student Riders	Loughborough Netball Centre
Nottingham Trent University	David Ross Sports Village
Reading Rockets	John Madejski Academy
Solent Kestrels Women	Park Leisure Centre
Southwark Pride Women	City Of London Academy
Thames Valley Cavaliers	Uxbridge College
Worcester Wolves	Worcester Arena

WNBL Division 2 League for the 2020/2021 Season.

=== Division 2 ===
North			South	
Team	Arena		Team	Arena
Derbyshire Gems	Killamarsh Sports Centre		Cardiff City	Cardiff City House of Sport
Mansfield Giants	Oak Tree Leisure Centre		Folkestone Saints	Folkestone Sport Centre
Northamptonshire Titans	Weavers Leisure Centre			
Nottingham Trent Wildcats	Nottingham Wildcats Arena		Solent Kestrels II	St. Marys Leisure Centre
	Surrey Goldhawks	Winston Churchill School		
	University of Exeter		University Of Exeter	

== League Champions ==
Season	Winners	Runner-up	Third place
2003/04	Rhondda Rebels	Sheffield Hatters	London Sting
2004/05	Rhondda Rebels	Sheffield Hatters	Nottingham Wildcats
2005/06	Rhondda Rebels	Sheffield Hatters	Nottingham Wildcats
2006/07	Sheffield Hatters	Rhondda Rebels	London Heathrow Acers
2007/08	Sheffield Hatters	Rhondda Rebels	Team Northumbria
2008/09	Sheffield Hatters	Cardiff Archers	Nottingham Wildcats
2009/10	Sheffield Hatters	Cardiff Archers	Nottingham Wildcats
2010/11	Sheffield Hatters	Cardiff Archers	Nottingham Wildcats
2011/12	Cardiff Archers	Sheffield Hatters	Barking Abbey Leopards
2012/13	Sheffield Hatters	Nottingham Wildcats	Barking Abbey
2013/14	Sheffield Hatters	Nottingham Wildcats	Loughborough Riders

Season	North Champions	South East Champions	South West Champions
2014/15	Sheffield Hallam Hatters	Oaklands College Wolves (St Albans)	Team Solent Suns
2015/16	Charnwood College Riders	Southwark Pride	Reading Rockets

Season	Winners	Runner-up	Third place
2016/17	Solent Kestrels	Southwark Pride	Charnwood College Riders

== Playoff Champions ==
Season	Winners	Runner-up	Result
2003/04	Sheffield Hatters	Rhondda Rebels	72 - 61
2004/05	Rhondda Rebels	Sheffield Hatters	64 - 58
2005/06	Sheffield Hatters	Rhondda Rebels	79 - 67
2006/07	Sheffield Hatters	Rhondda Rebels	76 - 63
2007/08	Rhondda Rebels	Sheffield Hatters	72 - 70
2008/09	Sheffield Hatters	Cardiff Archers	81 - 48
2009/10	Cardiff Archers	Sheffield Hatters	56 - 52
2010/11	Sheffield Hatters	Cardiff Archers	91 - 69
2011/12	Sheffield Hatters	Cardiff Archers	93 - 72
2012/13	Sheffield Hatters	Barking Abbey	70 - 57
2013/14	Loughborough Riders	Sheffield Hatters	68 - 63
2014/15	Team Solent Suns	Oaklands College Wolves (St Albans)	63 - 50
2015/16	Southwark Pride	Reading Rockets	68 - 59
2016/17	Southwark Pride	Solent Kestrels	67 - 53
