= British Basketball =

National sports governing body for basketball in Great Britain

British Basketball Federation
- Abbreviation: BBF
- Predecessor: British & Irish Basketball Federation
- Formation: 2006
- Type: National sports governing body
- Legal status: Private Limited company without share capital (British Performance Basketball Ltd)
- Purpose: Basketball in Great Britain and participation in international competitions
- Location: Manchester, England
- Region served: Great Britain
- Members: British basketball players
- Chairman: Vacant
- Main organ: BBF Board
- Affiliations: International Basketball Federation (FIBA), British Olympic Association, UK Sport
- Website: GB.basketball

The British Basketball Federation, known as British Basketball, was the national sports governing body for basketball in Great Britain. It organised Great Britain (GB) teams for men and women in international competition. Northern Irish players normally compete for Ireland, but are also eligible to compete for GB.

The three home nations associations—Basketball England, Basketball Scotland and Basketball Wales— have responsibility for basketball in their own countries, including organising competitions and developing the sport.

On 14 November 2025, British Basketball announced that it had ceased trading and had appointed professional advisors to “put the company into liquidation”.

== History ==
The British & Irish Basketball Federation (BIBF) was formed in 1960 from funding from the Sports Council. Northern Ireland began to be represented by Basketball Ireland, and in 2004 Ireland left the BIBF.

In October 2004 the BIBF changed its name to Great Britain Basketball.

In December 2006 the British Basketball Federation (BBF) was formed, and GB teams replaced England in the U20 and senior age groups in FIBA competitions. In order for GB teams to compete in the London Olympics in 2012, FIBA insisted that a single governing body for Great Britain be formed, rather than the existing three separate home nations. England, Scotland and Wales continued to compete separately in youth competitions.

Basketball Wales rejected a full merger in 2012, so the new governing body was initially formed by just England Basketball (now Basketball England) and basketballscotland. Wales eventually agreed to join the new federation in 2015. The merger was formally completed in October 2016, and the home nations gave up their individual memberships of FIBA. Great Britain national teams now compete in all age groups from U16 to senior, with Scotland and Wales still able to field separate teams in some lower division youth competitions.

The federation is based in the offices of UK Sport.

In April 2025, the British Basketball Federation signed a 15-year deal with Marshall Glickman's GBB League Ltd (GBBL) to operate the men's professional league from 2026.

In October 2025 the BBF was suspended by FIBA and the men's team banned from international competition following "apparent governance issues and regulatory non-compliance." In November 2025 the BBF declared it was going to go into liquidation.

== See also ==
- Basketball England
- basketballscotland
- Basketball Wales
- British Basketball League
