= Styliani Kaltsidou =

Greek basketball player

Stella Kaltsidou
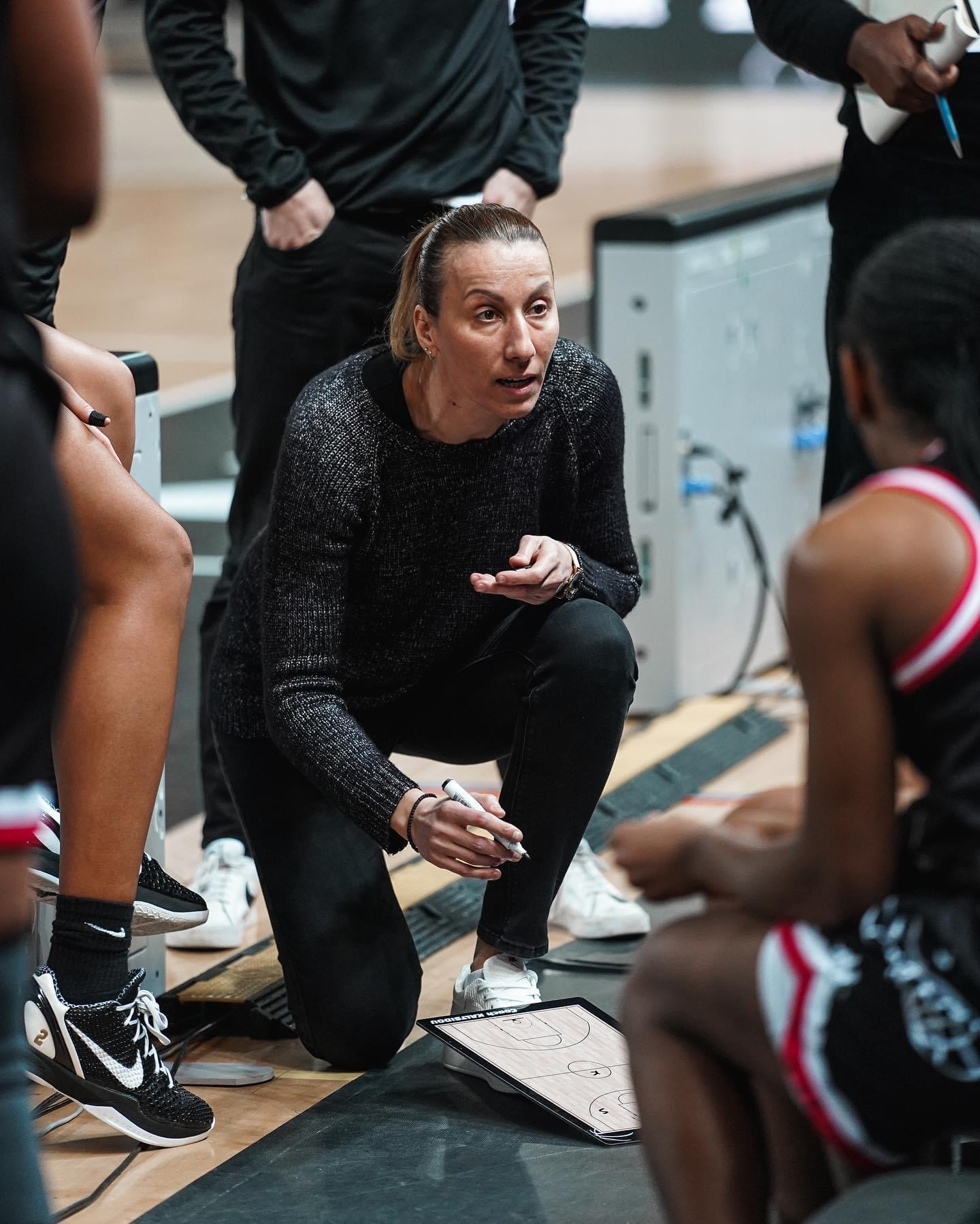
- Kaltsidou with London Lions in 2023

Personal information
- Born: 12 January 1983 (age 43) Thessaloniki, Greece

Career information
- Playing career: 1999–2019
- Position: Forward
- Coaching career: 2019–present

Career history

Playing
- 1999–2000: Iraklis Thessaloniki
- 2000–2002: Megas Alexandros Thessaloniki
- 2002–2003: Glyfada
- 2003–2009: Esperides Kallitheas
- 2009–2014: Tango Bourges Basket
- 2014–2015: Kayseri Kaski
- 2015: Tarbes Gespe Bigorre
- 2015–2016: Villeneuve-d'Ascq
- 2016–2018: Olympiacos
- 2018–2019: Polkowice

Coaching
- 2019–2020: Maroussi (assistant)
- 2020–2021: EFAOZ
- 2021–2022: Olympiacos (assistant)
- 2023–2024: London Lions
- 2024–2026: Athinaikos
- 2026: Greek National Team

Styliani "Stella" Kaltsidou (Στέλλα Στυλιανή Καλτσίδου; born 12 January 1983), is a Greek professional basketball coach and a former professional basketball player.

== Playing career ==
Kaltsidou started her career with the Galaxia Thessaloniki team. For one year she competed in the club of Propontida, until her transfer to Iraklis Thessaloniki in 1999. The following summer she chose another team from the co-capital, Megas Alexandros, with whose colors she played for two years and with whom she reached the final of the Greek Cup in March 2002.

In the 2002-03 season, she was a player of ANO Glyfada. With this team she also won the first of many titles in her career, the Greek Cup for that year. After the merger of Glyfada with Esperides, Kaltsidou continued her career in Kallithea's team. In both seasons 2002-03 and 2003-04 she took part in her first inter-club European competition, the FIBA Europe Cup, as the EuroCup competition was then called.

With the colors of Esperides, Kaltsidou has won two Greek Championships (2006, 2008) and four Greek Cups (2006, 2007, 2008, 2009), and was named the best player of the 2006 Cup final. She is also the athlete who has scored the most three-pointers in Cup finals to date, 11 in number.

In 2005 she received an invitation to participate in the All-Star Game held in Tripoli, Arcadia, while in 2006 in the event that took place in Kallithea Athens on April 3.

In her last year with Esperides team, 2008–09, she also appeared in 8 EuroCup games (33.8 minutes), putting up a remarkable 19.0 points, 3.5 rebounds and 1.3 assists per game.

In the summer of 2009, she took the decisive step of continuing her career abroad, specifically at the French team Bourges Basket. Together they won the French Cup in 2010, while they narrowly lost the French Championship to Tarbes. The international forward emerged as the top scorer of her team in the Women's EuroLeague (they reached the "16") with 139 points in 12 games and the fourth scorer of Bourges in French League with an average of 9.3 points per game (24 games). She was ranked 16th in FIBA Europe's 2010 European Women's Player of the Year poll, which was polled by experts and fans.

In the 2010–11 season, Bourges failed to compete in the final of the French Cup, having suffered a semi-final defeat by Mondeville. Nevertheless, they won the French Championship, which was the 10th trophy of the club in 17 years. The leading player in the second final was Kaltsidou, who scored 15 points. During all season, she played in 30 games (26 minutes avg) scoring 8 points and 4.2 rebounds per game, shooting 33% on 3-pointers, 41% on 2-pointers and 80% on field goals. In the EuroLeague, she played in 15 games for 29.6 minutes per game, having recorded 10.3 points, 5.7 rebounds and 2.4 assists.

In the 2011–12 season, Kaltsidou played in the Euroleague in 17 games for 28.9 minutes per game, having recorded 11.2 points, 5.4 rebounds and 2.4 assists. In March 2012, the player suffered a very serious injury - an anterior cruciate ligament tear - missing the rest of the season. However, showing confidence in her, Bourge's management renewed their collaboration for a fourth year. The team won again the French Championship in May.

Kaltsidou returned to the playing fields towards the end of 2012, however she was unlucky for the second time, as in March 2013 she got injured on the other knee and was again sidelined for a long time. In the same month, the club finished in 3rd place in the Euroleague winning the minor final against Kozice with a score of 65–57. Kaltsidou played in the competition in 11 games for 28.4 minutes average, having recorded 9.3 points, 5.3 rebounds and 1.6 assists per game. In the French League, Bourges won for third consecutive time the French Championship.

Being without a team for a long time, Kaltsidou renewed her partnership with Bourges in early 2014, strengthening the team until the return of an injured athlete.

Despite the misfortune with constant injuries, Kaltsidou became especially loved by Bourge's fans who on various occasions showed their recognition towards her.

In May 2014, Kaltsidou's collaboration with the Turkish Kayseri Kaski, a team that Evanthia Maltsi and Zoe Dimitrakou had played for in the recent past, was announced. The collaboration between the two sides ended in March 2015, when the player returned to France, this time on behalf of Tarbes Jesp Bigor. The team finished their competitive duties for the French Championship in 5th place. In 11 games, Kaltsidou collected by avg 11.2 points, 4.1 rebounds and 3.8 assists.

In May 2015, the player decided to continue her career in France, signing a contract with Villeneuve-d'Asc - Lille Metropol, runner-up of the previous year.

In May 2016, Kaltsidou returned to Greece on behalf of Olympiakos. With Olympiacos she won the double, Greek Championship and Cup, and renewed her contract until 2018. In the 2017–18 season, she again won the double with the red and whites.

On June 1, 2018, she was announced by Poland's club Polkowice. With her team she won the Polish Championship of the 2018–19 season, defeating Gorzów 3–0 in the finals series and previously also won the Polish Cup where she was concluded in the Best 5 players of the tournament.

On October 5, 2019, she announced the end of her long career after a total of 27 years, at the age of 36, having won four Greek Championships, four Greek Cups, three French Championships, one French Cup, as well as the double in Poland.

=== National team ===
Kaltsidou wore the national emblem for the first time in August 1998 in a game of the U16 Women National Team. In the two years 1998-1999 she participated in 19 games scoring 163 points, 8.58 ppg At the same time, she participated in the 1999 U16 European Championship in Romania. She played for the Junior National Team for the first time in March 2000, scoring 164 points in 15 games, 10.93 avg. She also took part in the 2000 European Junior Championships in Poland.

She joined the U23 women's national team for the first time in July 2001. In total, she competed in 19 games scoring 248 points, 13.05 ppg. At this level she took part in the European U23 Women's Championship in Zagreb, Croatia in 2002.

Her debut with the women's national team took place in September 2001, when she participated in the Tunis Mediterranean Games. The next major tournament she competed in was EuroBasket 2007 held in Chieti, Italy, in which Greece finished 13th in the final rankings. Competing in 3 games for 76 minutes, she averaged 8 points, 2.7 rebounds and 1.3 assists.

The next tournament for the basketball player and the national team was the 2009 Eurobasket in Latvia, where Greece achieved its biggest distinction up to that time, climbing to the 5th place in the final ranking. Kaltsidou played in 9 games for 294 minutes, averaging 9.2 points, 4.4 rebounds and 1.9 assists. The following year she traveled with the national team to Czech Republic, where the 2010 World Championship took place. Greece was ranked 11th, while Kaltsidou played in 8 games for 247 minutes, averaging 13.5 points, 5.1 rebounds and 2.2 assists.

Kaltsidou was present at EuroBasket 2011 held in Poland, in which Greece finished in 13th place. In the team's short participation in the competition, she played in 3 games for 95 minutes, averaging 11.3 points, 7.3 rebounds and 3 assists. In 2015 she participated in EuroBasket once again having 10.7 points, 5,3 rebounds and 1.4 assists.

In 2017 at EuroBasket in the Czech Republic, Greece achieved its highest position in country's history in the tournament up to date, after coming 4th, losing in the minor final to Belgium. Kaltsidou had a great tournament averaging 13.7 points, 5.3 rebounds and 2.3 assists, being concluded in the 2nd best team of the tournament.

In 2018 Greece participated in the world championship in Tenerife where they finished in 11th place. Kaltsidou in 4 games played an average of 27.6 minutes scoring an average of 7.8 points.

In November 2018, she announced her retirement from the women's national team after seventeen years.

== Coaching career ==
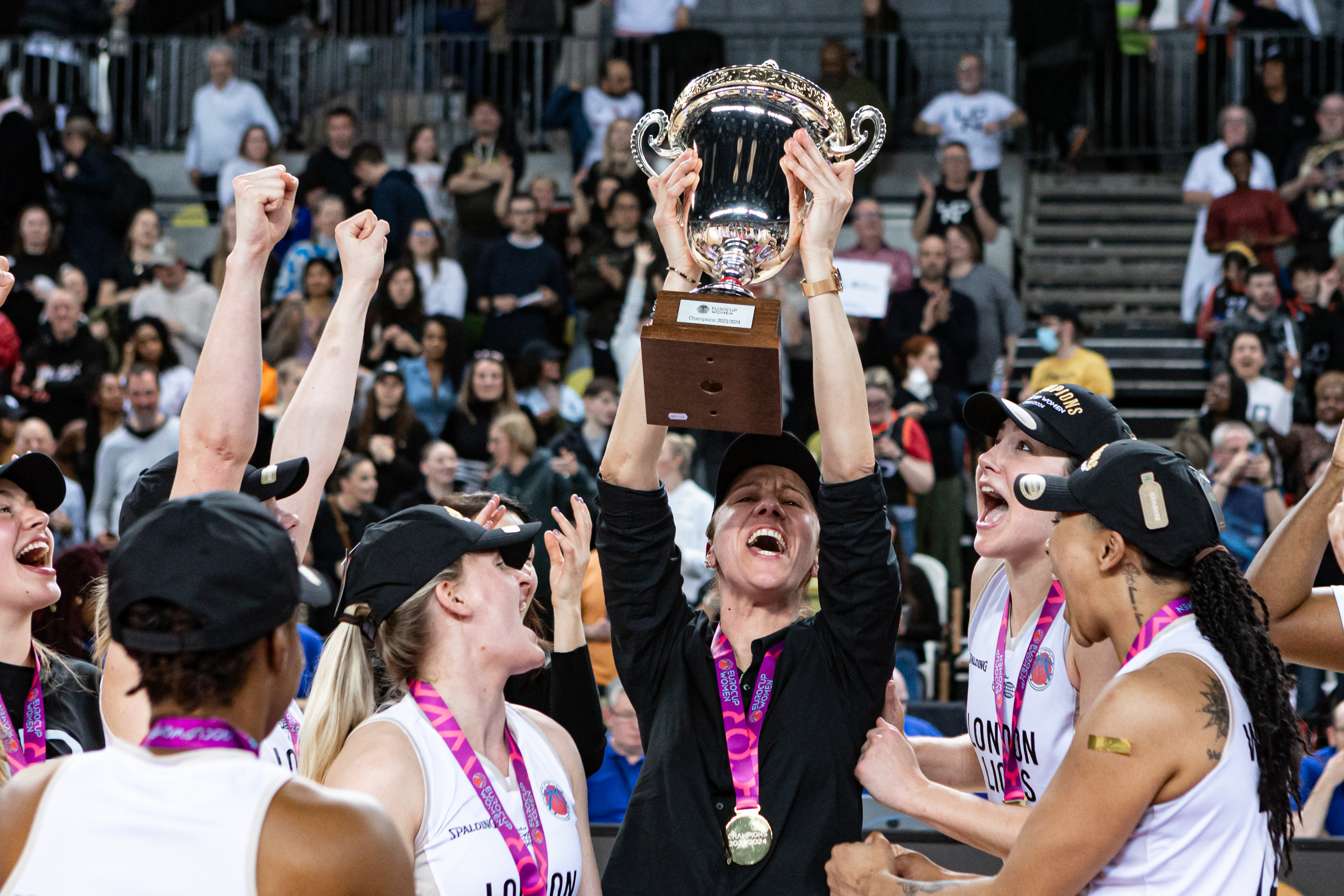
Eurocup Champions 10/4/24

In 2019, after announcing the end of her playing career, Kaltsidou was announced as an assistant coach for the men's team of Maroussi in Athens. She also held the role of technical advisor to the club's academies.

On June 19, 2020, it was announced that she is the head coach of Zografou Sports Association (EFAOZ), in the club's first appearance in the top A1 league, where she marked a big success by finishing in 6th place.

On June 12, 2021, she agreed with Olympiacos and assumed the position of assistant coach, becoming the direct collaborator of head coach, Martins Zibarts, winning the cup and the Greek championship. The club also participated in FIBA EuroCup where they qualified to the round of 8, which is the best place in club's history in the competition. On May 18, 2022, she left Olympiacos.

In October 2021, her two-year collaboration as an assistant coach with the Slovenia national team was announced, working alongside head coach George Dikeoulakos.

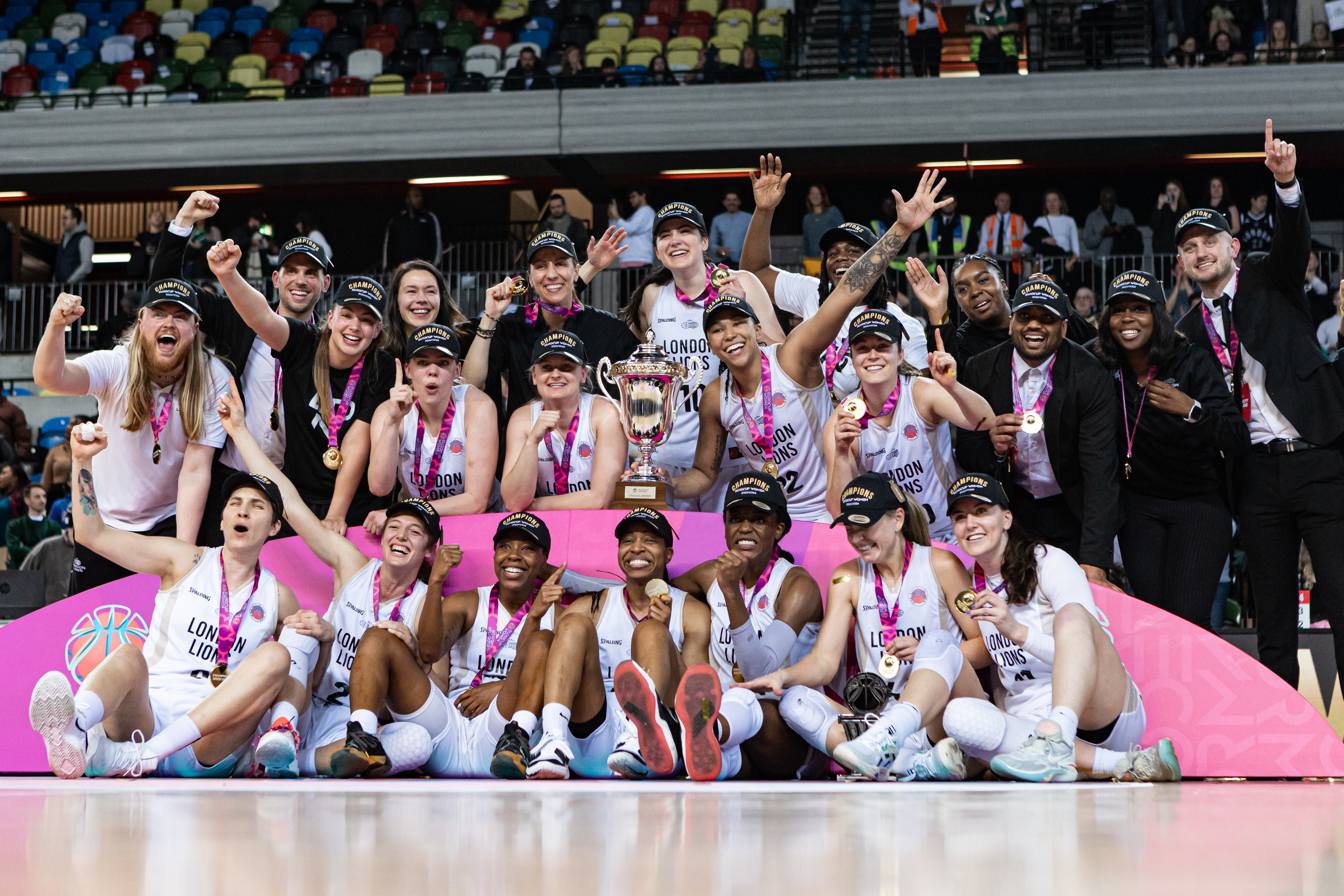
London Lions Eurocup Champions '24

On February 15, 2023, she was announced as the head coach of London Lions women's basketball team in the UK. At the end of the 2022–23 season, she won with her team the WBBL Championship and the Trophy Cup.

During the 2023–24 season, her team made history as they became the first ever British team, men or women, to win a European title as, on April 10, 2024, they were crowned FIBA EuroCup Women champions with record 15–1, beating Beşiktaş in the final. Kaltsidou became the first ever Greek woman coach to win a European title in women's basketball after her collaborator with the Slovenia national team, George Dikeoulakos, who also won EuroCup in 2010.

She was also named Coach of the Year 2024 after her team won all the domestic trophies during the 2023–24 season.

In November 2024, she was announced as a Head Coach of Athinaikos Qualco women's basketball team in Athens, Greece where she led the team to the finals of the Greek Championship against Olympiacos and on on season 2025-2026 she won both the Greek Cup and the Greek Championship with a record 22–1, while she also led the team to the Finals of the FIBA EuroCup Women against CBK Mersin. On April 25, 2026, her collaboration with Athinaikos team came to an end.

She was also named Coach of the Year 2026 from Eurobasket.com.

In September 17th, 2026 she was named as the Head Coach of the Greek Women National Team Is the first time in history that Greece hires a female coach to lead the National team.
