= Leicester Riders (women) =

English women's basketball team

- League: SLB
- Founded: 2011; 15 years ago
- History: Loughborough Riders; 2011-2014; Leicester Riders; 2014-present
- Arena: Loughborough University
- Location: Loughborough, England
- Website: Official website

The Leicester Riders are an English women's basketball team based in Loughborough, that compete in the Super League Basketball, the top league of British women's basketball.

== History ==
The Riders' programme was founded in 2011 at Loughborough University, and entered the National Basketball League Division Two in its first season. In that inaugural season, the Riders finished second in the league and won the post-season playoffs, earning promotion to Division One which at the time was the highest level of women's basketball in the United Kingdom.

In 2014, the Riders were founder members of the newly established Women's British Basketball League and the programme became known as the Leicester Riders, in closer partnership with the club. The Riders won their first WBBL title in 2018, winning the first of three consecutive WBBL Trophy titles. The Riders won their first WBBL Cup in 2021, defeating the Sevenoaks Suns in the final in Manchester.

== Honours ==
- WBBL Trophy (3): 2017-18, 2018–19, 2019–20
- WBBL Cup (1): 2020-21
- NBL Division One Playoffs (1): 2013-14
- NBL Division Two Playoffs (1): 2011-12

== Season-by-season records ==
Season	Division	Tier	Regular Season						Post-Season	WBBL Trophy	WBBL Cup	Head coach
Season	Division	Tier	Finish	Played	Wins	Losses	Points	Win %	Post-Season	WBBL Trophy	WBBL Cup	Head coach
Loughborough Riders
2011-12	NBL D2	2	2nd	16	15	1	30	0.938	Winners, beating Newham			Matt Harber
2012-13	NBL D1	1	4th	18	12	6	24	0.667	Semi-finals			Matt Harber
2013-14	NBL D1	1	4th	14	9	5	18	0.643	Winners, beating Sheffield			Matt Harber
Leicester Riders
2014-15	WBBL	1	4th	18	11	7	22	0.611	Semi-finals	Semi-finals		Matt Harber
2015-16	WBBL	1	6th	16	6	10	12	0.375	Quarter-finals	Quarter-finals		Matt Harber
2016-17	WBBL	1	2nd	18	13	5	26	0.722	Semi-finals	Runners-Up	Semi-finals	Krumesh Patel
2017-18	WBBL	1	2nd	20	19	1	38	0.950	Runners-Up	Winners, beating Sevenoaks	Semi-finals	Krumesh Patel
2018-19	WBBL	1	2nd	22	18	4	36	0.818	Runners-Up	Winners, beating Durham	Semi-finals	Jesper Sundberg
2019-20	WBBL	1	Season cancelled due to COVID-19 pandemic							Winners, beating Durham	Quarter-finals	Jesper Sundberg
2020-21	WBBL	1	2nd	20	18	2	36	0.900	Quarter-finals	Semi-finals	Winners, beating Sevenoaks	Jesper Sundberg
2021-22	WBBL	1	4th	24	14	10	28	0.583	Quarter-finals	Semi-finals	Semi-finals	Marg Jones

== Players ==
=== Current roster ===
Note: Flags indicate national team as defined under FIBA eligibility rules. Players may hold more than one non-FIBA nationality.

Leicester Riders Women 2024–25 roster
No.	Pos.	Nat.	Name
3	F	GBR	Katie Januszewska
4	G	USA	Kaia Harrison
7	G	GBR	Jessica Eadsforth-Yates
8	G	CAN	Shae Sanchez
10	C	GBR	Elise Tweedie
12	G	ISR	Shahd Abboud
20	F	USA	Brooke Bigott
21	F	GBR	Emma Dunsire

== See also ==
- Leicester Riders (men)
