= Gavin Mitchell =

Gavin Mitchell may refer to:

- Gavin Mitchell (actor) (born 1966), Scottish actor
- Gavin Mitchell (footballer) (born 1972), former Australian rules footballer
- Gavin Mitchell (Friends), a character from NBC sitcom Friends
