= Oaklands Wolves =

- League: SLB
- Founded: 2009; 17 years ago
- Arena: Oaklands College
- Location: St Albans, Hertfordshire
- Head coach: Michael Ball
- Website: https://www.oaklands.ac.uk/wolves/

The Oaklands Wolves are an English sports club and academy based in St Albans, Hertfordshire. Based at Oaklands College, the basketball academy has an official team which competes professionally in the National Basketball League and Super League Basketball. Students at Oaklands College can enrol on a number of different academies including basketball, football, rugby, hockey, athletics and cycling.

== Professional basketball teams ==
=== Women's team ===
==== History ====
The Wolves compete in the Women's British Basketball League, the premier women's basketball competition in the United Kingdom. The Wolves entered the league in 2016, and finished 10th in their inaugural season. The team qualified for the WBBL Playoffs for the first time during the 2018-19 season, finishing 8th in the league with a 9-13 record.

==== Season-by-season records ====
Season	Division	Tier	Regular Season						Post-Season	WBBL Trophy	WBBL Cup	Head coach
Season	Division	Tier	Finish	Played	Wins	Losses	Points	Win %	Post-Season	WBBL Trophy	WBBL Cup	Head coach
Oaklands Wolves
2016-17	WBBL	1	10th	18	0	18	0	0.000	Did not qualify	Pool Stage	Quarter-finals	Kenrick Liburd
2017-18	WBBL	1	9th	20	6	14	12	0.300	Did not qualify	Pool Stage	Quarter-finals	Kenrick Liburd
2018-19	WBBL	1	8th	22	9	13	18	0.409	Quarter-finals	Pool Stage	Quarter-finals	Lee Ryan
2019-20	WBBL	1	Season cancelled due to COVID-19 pandemic							Pool Stage	Quarter-finals	Lee Ryan
2020-21	WBBL	1	8th	20	7	13	14	0.350	Quarter-finals	Quarter-finals	Pool Stage	Lee Ryan
2021-22	WBBL	1	12th	24	5	19	10	0.208	Did not qualify	1st round	Pool Stage	Lauren Milligan
2022-23	WBBL	1	10th	22	5	17	10	0.227	Did not qualify	1st round	1st round	Tor Freeman
2023-24	WBBL	1	10th	20	5	15	10	0.200	Did not qualify	1st round		Lee Ryan

=== Men's team ===
==== History ====
In July 2020, the Wolves organisation merged with National Basketball League Division 1 side Essex & Herts Leopards, competing from the 2020-21 NBL D1 season as the Oaklands Wolves. The Wolves were in partnership with the Leopards from the 2018-19 season, providing opportunities for academy players to train and play with the team, as well as a home venue for training and matches.

== Players ==
Oaklands Wolves 26-27 roster
Players
Coaches

Pos.	No.	Nat.	Name	Ht.
G		(United Kingdom)	Adekeye, Lore	5 ft 7 in (1.70 m)
G		(United Kingdom)	Matthews, Spencer	6 ft 0 in (1.83 m)
G		(United Kingdom)	Pinnock, Reis	6 ft 1 in (1.85 m)
G		(United Kingdom)	Fatuda, Enzo Da Cruz	6 ft 2 in (1.88 m)
G		(United Kingdom)	Daley, Kane	6 ft 3 in (1.91 m)
G		(United Kingdom)	Disu, Matt	6 ft 4 in (1.93 m)
G		(United Kingdom)	Evans, Danny	6 ft 4 in (1.93 m)
G		(United Kingdom)	Morrell, Huxley	6 ft 4 in (1.93 m)
F		(United Kingdom)	Sigmund-Gordon, Milo	6 ft 5 in (1.96 m)
F		(United Kingdom)	McIntosh, Liam	6 ft 5 in (1.96 m)
F		(United Kingdom)	Flemming, Alvin	6 ft 5 in (1.96 m)
F		(United Kingdom)	Mitchell, Gavin	6 ft 7 in (2.01 m)
F		(United Kingdom)	Vines, Callum	6 ft 8 in (2.03 m)
F		(United Kingdom)	Gladstone, Dylan	6 ft 9 in (2.06 m)
F		(United Kingdom)	Adekunle, Deji	6 ft 10 in (2.08 m)

Head coach

(United Kingdom) Liam Jefferson

Legend

- (C) Team captain
- Injured

=== Season-by-season records ===
Season	Division	Tier	Regular Season						Post-Season	National Cup	Head coach
Season	Division	Tier	Finish	Played	Wins	Losses	Points	Win %	Post-Season	National Cup	Head coach
Oaklands Wolves
2020-21	D1	2	13th	19	4	15	8	0.211	1st round	No competition	Thomas Baker
2021-22	D1	2	14th	26	3	23	6	0.115	Did not qualify	4th round	Lee Ryan
2022-23	D2 Sou	3	10th	22	6	16	12	0.273	Did not qualify	2nd round	Lee Ryan
2023-24	D2 Sou	3	12th	22	3	19	6	0.136	Did not qualify		Jozef Butor; Faith Karahan

=== Academy & Junior teams ===
The foundations of the whole Wolves programme are based around an elite-level academy formed at Oaklands College in 2009. Oaklands compete in both the EABL and WEABL, the premier under-19s basketball competitions in the United Kingdom.

== Notable former players ==
- (United Kingdom) Benjamin Lawson
