= Manchester Mystics =

Manchester Giants
- League: WBBL
- Established: 1997; 29 years ago
- History: Manchester Mystics (1997–2018); Manchester Met Mystics (2018–2023); Manchester Giants (2023–present)
- Arena: National Basketball Centre
- Location: Manchester, England
- Championships: 1 WBBL Cup

The Manchester Giants, previously the Manchester Mystics, are a women's basketball team from Manchester, England, who compete in the Women's British Basketball League. The team play their home games at the National Basketball Centre.

== Honours ==
WBBL Cup

- Winners (1): 2016-17.

== Season-by-season records ==
Season	Division	Tier	Regular Season						Post-Season	WBBL Trophy	WBBL Cup	Head coach
Season	Division	Tier	Finish	Played	Wins	Losses	Points	Win %	Post-Season	WBBL Trophy	WBBL Cup	Head coach
Manchester Mystics
2014-15	WBBL	1	7th	18	6	12	12	0.333	Quarter-finals	Quarter-finals		Rob Fairley
2015-16	WBBL	1	9th	16	2	14	4	0.125	Did not qualify	Quarter-finals		Rob Fairley
2016-17	WBBL	1	4th	18	12	6	24	0.667	Quarter-finals	Group Stage	Winners, beating Nottingham	Jeff Jones
2017-18	WBBL	1	5th	20	12	8	24	0.600	Quarter-finals	Group Stage	Quarter-finals	Jeff Jones
Manchester Met Mystics
2018-19	WBBL	1	4th	22	14	8	28	0.636	Quarter-finals	Group Stage	Semi-finals	Jeff Jones
2019-20	WBBL	1	Season cancelled due to COVID-19 pandemic							Group Stage	Quarter-finals	Jeff Jones
2020-21	WBBL	1	5th	20	10	10	20	0.500	Quarter-finals	Semi-finals	Group Stage	Jeff Jones
2021-22	WBBL	1	9th	24	11	13	22	0.458	Did not qualify	Quarter-finals	Group Stage	Jeff Jones
2022-23	WBBL	1	12th	22	1	22	2	0.045	Did not qualify	Quarter-finals	1st Round	Marg Jones
Manchester Giants
2023-24	WBBL	1	9th	20	5	15	10	0.250	Did not qualify	Semi-finals		Marg Jones

== See also ==
- Manchester Giants (men)
- Manchester Magic
