= National Basketball Performance Centre =

Basketball arena in Manchester, England

- NBPC
- Interactive map of National Basketball Performance Centre
- Location: Belle Vue, Manchester, United Kingdom
- Coordinates: 53.4600°N 2.1913°W
- Owner: Manchester City Council
- Capacity: 2,000

Construction
- Opened: March 2016

Tenants
- Basketball England; Manchester Giants (2020-present); Manchester Mystics (2016-present); Manchester Thunder (2019-present); Manchester Titans (2018-present)

The National Basketball Performance Centre (NBPC) is a 2,000 capacity, three-court basketball arena located in Manchester, England.

== Background ==
Construction on the £11m Belle Vue Sports Village, including the 2,000 seat FIBA-standard arena, began in early 2015. The arena was funded by Manchester City Council, Basketball England and Sport England.

== Tenants ==
In August 2016, it was announced that the Manchester Mystics were to relocate to the NPBC ahead of the 2016–17 WBBL season.

The NBPC is the home of the Basketball England age-group teams. The arena also hosts the governing body's end-of-season National Basketball League playoff finals.

In 2019, Manchester Thunder of the Netball Superleague began to play some home fixtures at the arena. From 2020, all Thunder home games will be played at the NBPC.

On 24 July 2020, it was announced that the Manchester Giants will play at the NBPC from the 2020–21 season.

== International basketball matches ==
Date	Competition	Home team	Result	Away team	Ref.
20 February 2016	EuroBasket Women 2017 Qualifier	Great Britain	122–36	Albania	
24 February 2016	EuroBasket Women 2017 Qualifier	Great Britain	71–67	Montenegro	
11 November 2017	EuroBasket Women 2019 Qualifier	Great Britain	90-87 (ot)	Israel	
17 November 2018	EuroBasket Women 2019 Qualifier	Great Britain	79–77	Greece	
21 November 2018	EuroBasket Women 2019 Qualifier	Great Britain	83–42	Portugal	
29 November 2018	EuroBasket 2021 Pre Qualifier	Great Britain	82–96	Austria	
21 February 2019	EuroBasket 2021 Pre Qualifier	Great Britain	84–47	Cyprus	
10 August 2019	EuroBasket 2021 Pre Qualifier	Great Britain	71–54	Luxembourg	
17 August 2019	EuroBasket 2021 Pre Qualifier	Great Britain	101–79	Kosovo	
17 November 2019	EuroBasket Women 2021 Qualifier	Great Britain	59–90	Belarus	

== International wheelchair rugby league matches ==
Date	Team 1	Score	Team 2	Competition	Ref.
19 June 2022	England	62–48	France	Fassolette-Kielty Trophy	
