= Caledonia Gladiators (women) =

- League: SLB
- Founded: 2016; 10 years ago
- History: Caledonia Pride; 2016-2022; Caledonia Gladiators; 2022-present
- Arena: Playsport Arena
- Location: East Kilbride, Scotland
- Head coach: Chantelle Handy
- Ownership: Steve and Alison Timoney
- Website: Official website

The Caledonia Gladiators are a professional women's basketball team based in East Kilbride, Scotland. Formerly known as Caledonia Pride, they are the first and currently only women's professional basketball team in Scotland, competing in the Super League Basketball.

== History ==
Caledonia Pride (2016-2022)
In May 2016, the Women's British Basketball League awarded a franchise to basketballscotland, seeking to establish a franchise to help better prepare the Scottish national team for the 2018 Commonwealth Games in Gold Coast, Australia. In August 2016, the name Caledonia Pride was chosen and the team's coach was announced to be Edinburgh University women's head coach Bart Sengers, who would coach Pride for the next six seasons. After a 6 year run as Caledonia Pride and a disappointing 31 wins from 104 league games it was time for Scotland’s only professional female basketball team to look at a new way forward in respect of playing personnel and proper funding.

Caledonia Gladiators (2022–present)
In June 2022, basketballscotland announced the transfer of the professional franchise to the Lady Rocks basketball club. The new team was named Caledonia Gladiators, referencing the original name of the Lady Rocks club formed in 2006, with plans for their own custom-built facility in Lanarkshire. The 2022-23 season saw the newly formed club finish 2nd in the WBBL, a highest ever finish for any Scottish team. The 2023-24 season saw the Gladiators enter the FIBA EuroCup Women in a first ever foray into European competition with Coach Ortega taking his team to the knockout stages of the competition. Season 2024-25 saw a 2nd year of entering the FIBA EuroCup Women, however this campaign was short lived with 6 losses and no wins for Coach Handy.

== Home Venue ==
- Oriam National Performance Centre (2016-2019)
- University of Edinburgh Pleasance Sports Complex (2019–2021)
- The Crags Centre (2021-2022)
- Lagoon Centre (2022-2023)
- Playsport Arena (2023–present)

A purpose built 6000 seater arena was due for completion in 2024, however this has been postponed indefinitely as the struggle to fill the smaller arena continues.

Home games have also been played at the Grangemouth Sports Complex, Falkirk; Emirates Arena, Glasgow and The Peak, Stirling.

== Season-by-season records ==
Season	Division	Tier	Regular Season						Post-Season	WBBL Trophy	WBBL Cup	Head coach
Season	Division	Tier	Finish	Played	Wins	Losses	Points	Win %	Post-Season	WBBL Trophy	WBBL Cup	Head coach
Caledonia Pride
2016-17	WBBL	1	9th	18	5	13	10	0.278	Did not qualify	Pool Stage	1st round	Bart Sengers
2017-18	WBBL	1	7th	20	7	13	14	0.350	Quarter-finals	Pool Stage	Runners Up	Bart Sengers
2018-19	WBBL	1	11th	22	4	18	8	0.182	Did not qualify	Pool Stage	Quarter-finals	Bart Sengers
2019-20	WBBL	1	Season cancelled due to COVID-19 pandemic							Pool Stage	1st round	Bart Sengers
2020-21	WBBL	1	11th	20	3	17	6	0.150	Did not qualify	1st round	Did not compete	Bart Sengers
2021-22	WBBL	1	6th	24	12	12	24	0.500	Semi-finals	1st round	Group Stage	Bart Sengers
Caledonia Gladiators
2022-23	WBBL	1	2nd	22	17	5	34	0.773	Semi-finals	Quarter-finals	Quarter-finals	Miguel Ángel Ortega Marco
2023-24	WBBL	1	2nd	20	16	4	32	0.800	Semi-finals	Quarter-finals		Miguel Angel Ortega Chantelle Handy

== Players ==
=== Current roster ===
Note: Flags indicate national team, as has been defined under FIBA eligibility rules. Players may hold more than one non-FIBA nationality.

No.	Pos.	Nat.	Player
4	G	(Scotland) SCO	Robyn Lewis
6	G	(Scotland) SCO	Emma Kerr
7	G	(France) FRA	Mathilde Domenger
9	G	(Scotland) SCO	Hannah Robb
26	G	(Scotland) SCO	Kerry McGhee
27	G	(Scotland) SCO	Alix McIntosh

== Honours ==
WBBL Cup

- Runners-up: 2017-2018

Betty Cordona Trophy 2025

== Caledonia Blues ==
In 2025, the Gladiators announced the launch of a new development team, Caledonia Blues, to support younger players under 23 years old to train and play, and integrate and play with the Gladiators’ first teams.
