= City of Sheffield Hatters =

English basketball club

Sheffield Hatters
- League: Super League Basketball (Women)
- Founded: 1961
- Arena: Park Community Arena
- Location: Sheffield, England
- Main sponsor: B.Braun
- Championships: 1 WBBL Championship; 2 WBBL Cup; 1 SLB Play-off
- Website: sheffieldhatters.com

The Sheffield Hatters are a women's basketball club from Sheffield, England. The club have been mainstays of the women's game in England for many years, having celebrated their 50th anniversary in 2011, and were founder members of the professional Women's British Basketball League, which launched in 2014. They currently play in the new competition, launching in 2024 called Super League Basketball which is the new top competition for women’s basketball in Great Britain, and a direct predecessor to the WBBL.

== History ==
Founded in 1961, by Betty Codona OBE (1938–2022), the club's early years saw them compete primarily in local competition, although they did compete regularly in the Women's National Cup when this launched, making an appearance in the inaugural final in 1965. The Hatters first entered the Women's National Basketball League in 1977, joining the league in Division 2 (North). After their first season, the club accepted a place in the expanding Division 1, but failed to win a single game in two seasons in Division 1, leading to them dropping back down to the regional division.

In 1984, the club were promoted back to the top flight as Division 2 (North) Champions, after which they began a period of steadily strengthening their position, reaching the end-of-series playoffs for the first time in 1988 and claiming their first league title in 1991. The best was still to come though, as the team won their first League, Playoff and Cup triple in 1993, and went through two entire seasons undefeated between 1995 and 1997, claiming every major honour along the way. The 1990s represented a golden age of dominance for the club, claiming both the league title and National Cup nine out of ten times, and adding six of the ten playoff titles to that number.

Throughout the years, the club had played at a variety of venues, and attempts began to find a more permanent home in the early 2000s, when the club briefly relocated to the English Institute of Sport in Sheffield, sharing the venue with the City of Sheffield Arrows. However, the size and cost of the venue prompted a further move to the All Saints Catholic High School's Sports Centre in 2005, where they have remained ever since. While not quite up to the standard set in the previous decade, the 2000s still saw overwhelmingly strong results for the club, only once finishing outside the top three in any of the major tournaments. (A quarter-final defeat in the National Cup in 2000.)

With the London 2012 Olympics bringing extra exposure to basketball in the country, one of the Hatters' former players Jenaya Wade-Fray took to the court as part of Team GB. The club were also invited to join the professional Women's British Basketball League in 2014, giving a new stage for the club to continue their leadership of the women's game, both on and off the court.

Most recently, in the inaugural season of Super League Basketball, the Hatters won the Play-offs with victory over the Oaklands Wolves at The O2 Arena. This came after finishing as runners-up in the Championship and Cup competitions, and losing in the semi-final stage of the Betty Codona Trophy.

== Honours ==
Over their long history, the club have collected an enviable array of national titles, including winning the 'clean sweep' of League, National Cup and Playoffs on no less than ten occasions. The club have also won a variety of local, junior and masters titles, which are listed on their website.

Women's British Basketball League

- Winners (1): 2014–15.

WBBL/SLB Play-offs

- Winners (1): 2014–15, 2024-25.

WBBL Trophy

- Winners (2): 2014–2015, 2015–2016

WBBL Cup

- Winners (2): 2016–2017, 2018–2019

NBL / EBL Division 1 League Champions

- 1990, 1991, 1992, 1993, 1994, 1995, 1996, 1997, 1998, 1999, 2000, 2001, 2002, 2003, 2006, 2007, 2008, 2009, 2010, 2011, 2013, 2014

NBL / EBL Division 1 Playoff Champions

- 1993, 1995, 1996, 1997, 1998, 1999, 2000, 2001, 2002, 2003, 2004, 2006, 2007, 2009, 2011, 2012, 2013

National Cup Champions

- 1990, 1991, 1992, 1993, 1994, 1995, 1996, 1997, 1999, 2002, 2007, 2009, 2010, 2011, 2012, 2013

National Trophy Champions

- 1984

NBL Division 2 (North) League Champions

- 1984

== Season-by-season records ==
Season	Division	Played	Won	Lost	Points	League	Playoffs	Cup	Trophy
City of Sheffield Hatters
1979–80	NBL Division 2 (North) Women	10	6	4	12	3rd	DNQ	2nd Round	N/A
1980–81	NBL Division 1 Women	14	0	14	0	8th	DNQ	DNE	N/A
1981–82	NBL Division 1 Women	16	0	16	0	9th	DNQ	1st Round	N/A
1982–83	NBL Division 2 (North) Women	12	8	4	16	3rd	DNQ	1st Round	Semi-final
1983–84	NBL Division 2 (North) Women	12	11	1	22	1st	Semi-final	2nd Round	Winners
1984–85	NBL Division 1 Women	22	8	14	16	9th	DNQ	2nd Round	N/A
1985–86	NBL Division 1 Women	18	10	8	20	6th	DNQ	Quarter-final	N/A
1986–87	NBL Division 1 Women	18	9	9	18	5th	DNQ	2nd Round	N/A
1987–88	NBL Division 1 Women	18	11	7	22	3rd	Semi-final	Quarter-final	N/A
1988–89	NBL Division 1 Women	22	12	10	24	7th	Semi-final	2nd Round	N/A
1989–90	NBL Division 1 Women	22	20	2	40	2nd	Runner-up	Winners	N/A
1990–91	NBL Division 1 Women	20	18	2	36	1st	Semi-final	Winners	N/A
1991–92	NBL Division 1 Women	20	19	1	38	1st	Runner-up	Winners	N/A
1992–93	NBL Division 1 Women	22	21	1	42	1st	Winners	Winners	N/A
1993–94	NBL Division 1 Women	22	21	1	42	1st	Runner-up	Winners	N/A
1994–95	NBL Division 1 Women	20	18	2	36	1st	Winners	Winners	N/A
1995–96	NBL Division 1 Women	22	22	0	44	1st	Winners	Winners	N/A
1996–97	NBL Division 1 Women	22	22	0	44	1st	Winners	Winners	N/A
1997–98	NBL Division 1 Women	20	19	1	38	1st	Winners	Runner-up	N/A
1998–99	NBL Division 1 Women	22	21	1	42	1st	Winners	Winners	N/A
1999–2000	NBL Division 1 Women	22	21	1	42	1st	Winners	Quarter-final	N/A
2000–01	NBL Division 1 Women	22	18	4	36	3rd	Runner-up	Runner-up	N/A
2001–02	NBL Division 1 Women	16	14	2	28	1st	Winners	Winners	N/A
2002–03	WNBL Conference	14	13	1	26	1st	Winners	Runner-up	N/A
2003–04	EBL Division 1 Women	18	13	5	26	2nd	Winners	Semi-final	N/A
2004–05	EBL Division 1 Women	18	16	2	32	2nd	Runner-up	Runner-up	N/A
2005–06	EBL Division 1 Women	18	16	2	32	2nd	Winners	Runner-up	N/A
2006–07	EBL Division 1 Women	16	15	1	30	1st	Winners	Winners	N/A
2007–08	EBL Division 1 Women	18	17	1	34	1st	Runner-up	Runner-up	N/A
2008–09	EBL Division 1 Women	20	19	1	38	1st	Winners	Winners	N/A
2009–10	EBL Division 1 Women	20	19	1	38	1st	Runner-up	Winners	N/A
2010–11	EBL Division 1 Women	21	20	1	40	1st	Winners	Winners	N/A
2011–12	EBL Division 1 Women	21	18	3	36	2nd	Winners	Winners	N/A
2012–13	EBL Division 1 Women	18*	17	0	34	1st	Winners	Winners	N/A
2013–14	EBL Division 1 Women	14	12	2	24	1st	Runner-up	Quarter-final	N/A
2014–15	WBBL	18	17	1	34	Winners	Winners	Semi-final	Winners
2015–16	WBBL	16	13	3	26	3rd	Semi-final	Semi-final	Winners
2016–17	WBBL	18	11	7	22	5th	Semi-final	Semi-final	Semi-final
2017–18	WBBL	20	14	6	28	3rd	Semi-final	Quarter-final	Semi-final
2018–19	WBBL	22	16	4	32	3rd	-	Winners	Semi-final

- In the 2002–2003 season the WNBL Conference operated as the top-flight league, ahead of Division One.
- In 2003 the NBL was replaced by the EBL, which reinstated Division One as the top flight.
- One match in the 2012–2013 season against Newham Stars was declared void.

== Players ==
=== Current roster ===
Note: Flags indicate national team eligibility at FIBA-sanctioned events. Players may hold other non-FIBA nationalities not displayed.

Westfield Health Sheffield Hatters roster
Players
Coaches

Pos.	No.	Nat.	Name	Ht.
G	2	(United States)	Cardenas, Rebecca	5 ft 5 in (1.65 m)
G	3	(United Kingdom)	Fong Lyew Quee, Nicolette	5 ft 4 in (1.63 m)
G	4	(United Kingdom)	Whitehouse, Abby	5 ft 9 in (1.75 m)
C	5	(United Kingdom)	Shaw, Hannah	6 ft 4 in (1.93 m)
F	9	(United Kingdom)	Naylor, Helen	5 ft 11 in (1.80 m)
SG	11		McGrath, Charley
F	12	(United States)	Gill, Ariona	6 ft 0 in (1.83 m)
F	13	(United Kingdom)	Campbell, Naomi	5 ft 11 in (1.80 m)
G	14	(Ireland)	Nee, Aisling
C	15	(United States)	Jamison-Myers, Nyilah	6 ft 4 in (1.93 m)
G	20	(United Kingdom)	Ioannou, Elysa
G	22	(United Kingdom)	Gayle, Georgia

Head coach

(United Kingdom) Vanessa Ellis

Legend

- (C) Team captain
- Injured

=== Depth chart ===
Pos.	Starting 5	Bench
C
PF
SF
SG
PG

== Notable former players ==
- (United Kingdom) Jenaya Wade-Fray
