= Nottingham Wildcats =

English women basketball club

- League: SLB
- Founded: 1976; 50 years ago
- History: Nottingham Wildcats; 1976–present
- Arena: Nottingham Wildcats Arena
- Location: Nottingham, England
- Team colors
- Head coach: Kenrick Liburd
- Championships: 2 WBBL Championship
- Website: nottinghamwildcatsbasketball.co.uk

The Nottingham Wildcats are an English basketball club based in Nottingham, England. The Wildcats' senior women's team compete in Super League Basketball.

== History ==
The Wildcats were established in 1976 and are the biggest women's basketball club in Nottingham. The team is run by the Nottingham Wildcats Community Basketball and Sports Trust. The Wildcats are one of only a handful of British basketball clubs to administer and run their own facility, the Nottingham Wildcats Arena, which opened in 2001.

A perennially team in the English Women's Basketball League, the Wildcats were one of the founder members of the Women's British Basketball League in 2014.

== Home venues ==
- Dayncourt School
- Portland Leisure Centre
- Nottingham Wildcats Arena (2001–present)

== Season-by-season records ==
Season	Division	Tier	Regular season						Playoffs	WBBL Trophy	WBBL Cup	Head coach
Season	Division	Tier	Finish	Played	Wins	Losses	Points	Win %	Playoffs	WBBL Trophy	WBBL Cup	Head coach
Nottingham Wildcats
2014–15	WBBL	1	2nd	18	16	2	32	.889	Runners up	Runners up	—	Dave Greenaway
2015–16	WBBL	1	1st	16	15	1	30	.938	Runners up	Semi-finals	—	Dave Greenaway
2016–17	WBBL	1	1st	18	14	4	28	.778	Runners up	Semi-finals	Runners up	Dave Greenaway
2017–18	WBBL	1	4th	20	12	8	24	.600	Semi-finals	Pools stage	Winners	Dave Greenaway
2018–19	WBBL	1	6th	22	11	11	22	.500	Quarter-finals	Pools stage	Quarter-finals	Kenrick Liburd
2019–20	WBBL	1	(Note: The 2019–20 season was cancelled in March 2020 due to the COVID-19 pandemic. The Wildcats were in 5th at the time.)	18	11	7	22	.611		Semi-finals	Quarter-finals	Kenrick Liburd
2020–21	WBBL	1	4th	20	11	9	22	.550	Semi-finals	Runners up	Semi-finals	Kenrick Liburd
2021–22	WBBL	1	5th	24	12	12	24	.500	Semi-finals	Semi-finals	Pools stage	Kenrick Liburd
2022–23	WBBL	1	11th	22	3	19	6	.136	Did not qualify	1st Round	Quarter-finals	Kenrick Liburd
2023–24	WBBL	1	8th	20	6	14	12	.300		Quarter-finals		Karen Burton

== Players ==
=== Current roster ===
Note: Flags indicate national team eligibility at FIBA-sanctioned events. Players may hold other non-FIBA nationalities not displayed.

Nottingham Wildcats roster
Players
Coaches

Pos.	No.	Nat.	Name	Ht.
G	1	(United Kingdom)	Ashton, Brahe	5 ft 5 in (1.65 m)
G	3	(United States)	Edmonds, Shaunay	5 ft 5 in (1.65 m)
G	5	(United Kingdom)	Evison, Maisie
G	6	(United Kingdom)	Casanova, Dejanae
G	9	(Canada)	Gyles, Jahnae	5 ft 7 in (1.70 m)
G	11	(United Kingdom)	Charity, Natalie
F	14	(Spain)	Bueriberi, Isabel	6 ft 0 in (1.83 m)
F	15	(United Kingdom)	Ashton, Grace
F	21	(Germany)	Egharevba, Praise	6 ft 2 in (1.88 m)
G / F	22	(United Kingdom)	Whittingham, Imani	5 ft 11 in (1.80 m)
G	23	(United States)	Pannell, Brooklyn	5 ft 9 in (1.75 m)
F	30	(United States)	Nicholas, Kennedy	6 ft 3 in (1.91 m)

Head coach

- (United Kingdom) Kenrick Liburd

Legend

- (C) Team captain
- Injured

== Honours ==
- WBBL Championship (2): 2015-16, 2016-17
- WBBL Cup (1): 2017-18

== See also ==
- Nottingham Hoods
