= Essex Rebels =

- League: Women: SLB; Men: BCB
- Established: 2014; 12 years ago
- History: University of Essex; 2014-2018; Essex Rebels; 2018–present
- Arena: Essex Sport Arena
- Capacity: 1,655
- Location: Colchester, Essex
- Main sponsor: Elavon
- Championships: Women's National Cup 2016; Women's Division 1 2017-18
- Website: Official website
Home	Away

The Essex Rebels are a basketball club from Colchester, Essex. The Rebels' women's team compete in the Super League Basketball, the top-level women's basketball league in Great Britain. After competing in the NBL as the Essex Blades, the Rebels moved into the professional ranks of the WBBL at the start of the 2018-19 season.

== Women's team ==
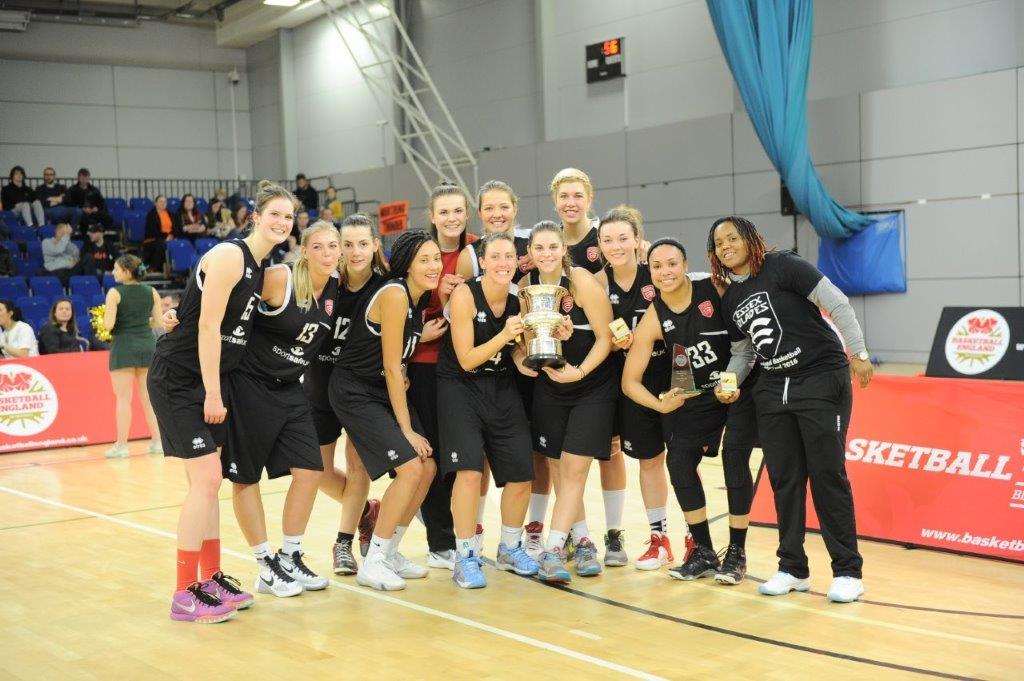
2016 Cup Final Winners

The Rebels are coached by Tom Sadler, who has been coaching the team since November 2018 and is now in a permanent position of Head of Basketball Performance for the University.

=== Current roster ===
Note: Flags indicate national team eligibility at FIBA-sanctioned events. Players may hold other non-FIBA nationalities not displayed.

Essex Rebels roster
Players
Coaches

Pos.	No.	Nat.	Name	Ht.
F	2	(United States)	Waithe, Deangelique	6 ft 0 in (1.83 m)
G	4	(United Kingdom)	Munns, Ashleigh	5 ft 9 in (1.75 m)
G	10	(United Kingdom)	Partridge, Olivia	5 ft 10 in (1.78 m)
G	11	(Spain)	Bieg, Carla	5 ft 6 in (1.68 m)
F	21	(Italy)	Costa, Lucrezia	6 ft 2 in (1.88 m)
C	23	(United Kingdom)	Haines, Megan	6 ft 2 in (1.88 m)
F	25	(Germany)	Kohlhaas, Andrea	5 ft 11 in (1.80 m)
PF		(Scotland)	Paxton, Claire	6 ft 2 in (1.88 m)
SG		(United Kingdom)	Freeman, Tia	5 ft 5 in (1.65 m)
G		(United Kingdom)	Mbam, Jade	5 ft 7 in (1.70 m)

Head coach

(United Kingdom) Tom Sadler

Assistant coach(es)

(United Kingdom) Ross Norfolk (United Kingdom) Justin Mills

Legend

- (C) Team captain
- Injured

=== Season-by-season records ===
Season	Division	Tier	Regular Season						Post-Season	National Cup	Head coach
Season	Division	Tier	Finish	Played	Wins	Losses	Points	Win %	Post-Season	National Cup	Head coach
Essex Blades
2015-16	D1 SE	2	2nd	12	9	3	18	0.750	Semi-finals	Winners	Mark Lloyd
2016-17	D1	2	6th	20	10	10	20	0.500	Quarter-finals	Quarter-finals	Mark Lloyd
2017-18	D1	2	1st	22	20	2	40	0.909	Runners-Up	Runners-Up	Mark Lloyd

Season	Division	Tier	Regular Season						Post-Season	WBBL Trophy	WBBL Cup	Head coach
Season	Division	Tier	Finish	Played	Wins	Losses	Points	Win %	Post-Season	WBBL Trophy	WBBL Cup	Head coach
Essex Rebels
2018-19	WBBL	1	12th	22	3	19	6	0.136	Did not qualify	Pool Stage	1st round	Tom Sadler
2019-20	WBBL	1	Season cancelled due to COVID-19 pandemic							Pool Stage	1st round	Tom Sadler
2020-21	WBBL	1	6th	20	10	10	20	0.500	Quarter-finals	1st round	Did not compete	Tom Sadler
2021-22	WBBL	1	7th	24	12	12	24	0.500	Quarter-finals	Quarter-finals	Pool Stage	Tom Sadler
2022-23	WBBL	1	6th	22	10	12	20	0.455	Quarter-finals	Semi-finals	Quarter-finals	Tom Sadler; Ross Norfolk
2023-24	WBBL	1	5th	20	11	9	22	0.550		Runners-up		Ashley Cookson

== Men's team ==
=== Current roster ===
Essex Rebels 26-27 roster
Players
Coaches

Pos.	No.	Nat.	Name	Ht.
G		(United Kingdom)	Wol-Cummings, Mou	6 ft 1 in (1.85 m)
G		(United States)	Baumgardner III, Tre	6 ft 1 in (1.85 m)
G		(United Kingdom)	Martin, Kyron	6 ft 4 in (1.93 m)
F		(United Kingdom)	Hudson, Tyreese	6 ft 4 in (1.93 m)
G		(United Kingdom)	Amako, Michael	6 ft 6 in (1.98 m)
F		(Wales)	McKew, Johnny	6 ft 6 in (1.98 m)
F		(United States)	Cisse, Aliou	6 ft 7 in (2.01 m)
F		(United Kingdom)	Gent, Harry	6 ft 7 in (2.01 m)
F		(United Kingdom)	Johnson-Thompson, Daniel	6 ft 7 in (2.01 m)

Head coach

(United Kingdom) Joe Hart

Assistant coach(es)

(United Kingdom) [[]]

Legend

- (C) Team captain
- Injured

=== Season-by-season records ===
Season	Division	Tier	Regular Season						Post-Season	National Cup	Head coach
Season	Division	Tier	Finish	Played	Wins	Losses	Points	Win %	Post-Season	National Cup	Head coach
University of Essex
2015-16	Dev SE	5	4th	18	10	8	20	0.556	Did not qualify	1st round	
2016-17	D4 SE	5	1st	18	14	4	28	0.778	Quarter-finals	1st round	
2017-18	D3 Sou	4	6th	18	9	9	18	0.500	Did not qualify	1st round	
2018-19	D3 Sou	4	4th	16	10	6	20	0.625	Semi-finals	1st round	
Essex Rebels
2019-20	D2 Sou	3	1st	17	15	2	31	0.882	No playoffs	4th round	Ross Norfolk
2020-21	D1	2	6th	19	9	10	18	0.474	1st round	No competition	Ross Norfolk
2021-22	D1	2	12th	26	4	22	8	0.154	Did not qualify	4th round	Ross Norfolk
2022-23	D1	2	11th	26	8	18	16	0.308	Did not qualify	5th round	Ross Norfolk
2023-24	D1	2	2nd	24	20	4	40	0.833			Ross Norfolk

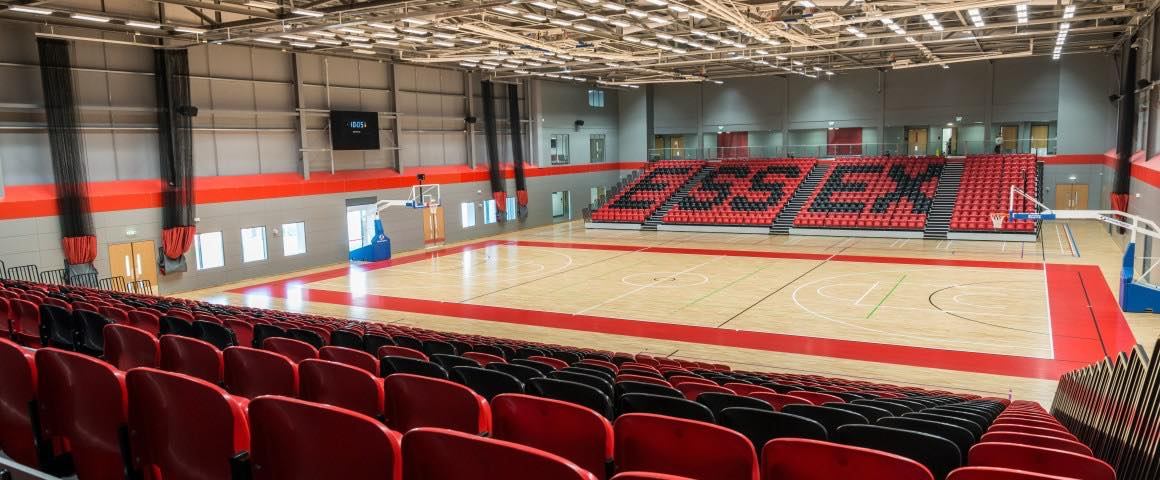
Essex Arena
