= Stef Collins =

British basketball player

Personal information
- Born: 30 December 1982 (age 43) Upper Heyford, Oxfordshire, England
- Listed height: 5 ft 6 in (168 cm)
- Listed weight: 139 lb (63 kg)

Career information
- College: St. Bonaventure (2001–2006)

Career history
- 2006–2007: Rhondda Rebels
- 2007–2020: Cardiff Met Archers

Career highlights
- A-10 Rookie of the Year (2002); Second-team All-A-10 (2004); Third-team All-A-10 (2005)
Medals
Women's basketball
Representing England
Commonwealth Games
| Silver medal – second place | 2018 Gold Coast | Team |

Stefanie Lyn "Stef" Collins OLY (born 30 December 1982) is a former basketball player for Great Britain women's national basketball team. She was part of the squad for the 2012 Summer Olympics.

Collins grew up in Montour Falls, New York after being born in England. She led Odessa-Montour Central School to a NYSPHSAA title in basketball before playing college basketball for St. Bonaventure University. She finished a decorated college career in 2006 and began playing professionally for the Rhondda Rebels.
