= Durham Palatinates =

- League: SLB
- Founded: 2017; 9 years ago
- History: Durham Palatinates; 2017–2025
- Arena: Sports and Wellbeing Park
- Location: Durham, England
- Ownership: Durham University
- Website: Official website

The Durham Palatinates are an English women's basketball team based in Durham, England. The Palatinates compete in the Super League Basketball, the premier women's basketball competition in the United Kingdom.

== History ==
The Palatinates officially joined the Women's British Basketball League in May 2017. The Durham University-backed team is a relaunch from the men's Wildcats team that competed in the British Basketball League between 2011 and 2015. Women's university team and former Wildcats head coach Lee Davie was retained as the Palatinates' first head coach.

The team decided not to continue into the 2025–26 season and, as such, the league continued with 10 teams.

== Home Venue ==
- Queen's Sports Centre (2017–2019)
- Sports and Wellbeing Park (2019–2025)

== Season-by-season records ==
Season	Division	Tier	Regular Season						Post-Season	WBBL Trophy	WBBL Cup	Head coach
Season	Division	Tier	Finish	Played	Wins	Losses	Points	Win %	Post-Season	WBBL Trophy	WBBL Cup	Head coach
Durham Palatinates
2017-18	WBBL	1	10th	20	5	15	10	0.250	Did not qualify	Pool stage	1st round	Lee Davie
2018-19	WBBL	1	5th	22	12	10	24	0.545	Semi-finals	Runners Up	1st round	Lee Davie
2019-20	WBBL	1	Season cancelled due to COVID-19 pandemic							Runners Up	Runners Up	Lee Davie
2020-21	WBBL	1	10th	20	4	16	8	0.200	Did not qualify	Quarter-finals	Did not compete	Lee Davie
2021-22	WBBL	1	8th	24	11	13	23	0.458	Quarter-finals	Quarter-finals	Group Stage	Lee Davie
2022-23	WBBL	1	9th	22	9	13	18	0.409	Did not qualify	1st round	Quarter-finals	Matthew Newby
2023-24	WBBL	1	7th	20	8	12	16	0.400		Quarter-finals		Lee Davie

== Players ==
=== Current roster ===
Note: Flags indicate national team eligibility at FIBA-sanctioned events. Players may hold other non-FIBA nationalities not displayed.

Durham Palatinates roster
Players
Coaches

Pos.	No.	Nat.	Name	Ht.
G	2	(United States)	Griffith Wallace, Janika	5 ft 8 in (1.73 m)
F	3	(United States)	Hendershot, Elle	6 ft 0 in (1.83 m)
F	4	(Canada)	Klassen, Sophie	6 ft 0 in (1.83 m)
G	5	(United States)	Brault, Eliza	5 ft 9 in (1.75 m)
G	7	(United Kingdom)	Bennett, Katie	5 ft 8 in (1.73 m)
G	8	(United Kingdom)	Chukwu-Etu, Orieoma	5 ft 9 in (1.75 m)
G	9	(United Kingdom)	Samuels-Campbell, Aaliyah	5 ft 6 in (1.68 m)
G	11	(United Kingdom)	Wood, Izzy	5 ft 9 in (1.75 m)
G	12	(United Kingdom)	Moran, Ellie	5 ft 7 in (1.70 m)
F	14	(United Kingdom)	Ottewill-Soulsby, Harriet	6 ft 3 in (1.91 m)

Head coach

- (United Kingdom) Lee Davie

Legend

- (C) Team captain
- Injured

== Honours ==
- WBBL Trophy Runners Up (1): 2018-19
- WBBL Cup Runners Up (1): 2019-20

== See also ==
- Durham Wildcats
