= Cardiff Met Archers =

- League: Women SLB; Men NBL D2, BWNL
- Established: 1999; 27 years ago
- History: UWIC Archers (1999–2011); Cardiff Met Archers (2011–present)
- Location: Cardiff, Wales
- Website: Official website

The Cardiff Met Archers are a Welsh basketball club, based in the city of Cardiff, South Wales.

== History ==
The Archers began in 1999 as the student-led university basketball team at University of Wales Institute, Cardiff, competing in the British University Sports Association (BUSA) and the West of England Basketball Association (WEBBA). Now, the Archers' club run 19 teams that range from Under 8s through to seniors, as well as the only Welsh side competing in the Women's British Basketball League, the highest level of women's basketball in the United Kingdom.

== Home venue ==
The Archers play their home games at the newly-opened Archers Arena on campus at Cardiff Metropolitan University. The arena has capacity for 500 spectators and is also the home of the Welsh national basketball team.

== Women ==
=== Season-by-season records ===
Season	Division	Tier	Regular Season						Post-Season	WBBL Cup	WBBL Trophy
Season	Division	Tier	Finish	Played	Wins	Losses	Points	Win %	Post-Season	WBBL Cup	WBBL Trophy
UWIC Archers
2009–10	EBL D1	1	2nd	20	17	3	34	0.850	Winners	-	-
2010–11	EBL D1	1	2nd	21	17	4	34	0.810	Runners Up	-	-
2011–12	EBL D1	1	1st	21	19	2	38	0.905	Runners Up	-	-
Cardiff Met Archers
2012–13	EBL D1	1	5th	18	9	9	18	0.500	Did not qualify	-	-
2013–14	EBL D1	1	3rd	14	9	5	18	0.643	Semi-finals	-	-
2014–15	WBBL	1	5th	18	10	8	20	0.556	Quarter-finals	-	Quarter-finals
2015–16	WBBL	1	7th	16	5	11	10	0.313	Quarter-finals	-	Quarter-finals
2016–17	WBBL	1	8th	18	5	13	10	0.278	Quarter-finals	First round	Pool Stage
2017–18	WBBL	1	8th	20	6	14	12	0.300	Quarter-finals	First round	Pool Stage
2018–19	WBBL	1	10th	22	5	17	10	0.227	Did not qualify	First round	Pool Stage
2019–20	WBBL	1	Season cancelled due to COVID-19 pandemic							First round	Pool Stage
2020-21	WBBL	1	9th	20	5	15	10	0.250	Did not qualify	Semi-finals	First round
2021-22	WBBL	1	11th	24	6	18	12	0.250	Did not qualify	Group stage	Quarter-finals
2022-23	WBBL	1	7th	22	9	13	18	0.409	Quarter-finals	First round	Quarter-finals
2023-24	WBBL	1	11th	20	0	20	0	0.000	Did not qualify	-	Preliminary round
2024-25	WBBL	1	9th	20	6	14	12	0.300	Did not qualify	-	Group stage

== Men ==
=== Season-by-season records ===
Season	Division	Tier	Regular Season						Post-Season	National Cup
Season	Division	Tier	Finish	Played	Wins	Losses	Points	Win %	Post-Season	National Cup
UWIC Archers
2009–10	D3 Sou	4	9th	18	4	14	8	0.222	Did not qualify	
2010–11	D3 Sou	4	9th	20	5	15	10	0.250	Did not qualify	
2011–12	D3 Sou	4	10th	20	3	17	6	0.150	Did not qualify	
Cardiff Met Archers
2012–13	D3 Sou	4	8th	18	4	18	8	0.222	Did not qualify	
2013–14	D3 Sou	4	10th	20	4	16	8	0.200	Did not qualify	
2014–15	D3 Sou	4	8th	18	5	13	10	0.278	Did not qualify	
2015–16	Dev SW	5	1st	20	15	5	30	0.750	Quarter-finals	
2016–17	D3 Sou	4	5th	18	10	8	20	0.556	Did not qualify	
2017–18	D3 Sou	4	5th	18	9	9	18	0.500	Did not qualify	
2018–19	D3 Sou	4	6th	16	7	9	14	0.438	Did not qualify	
2019–20	D2 Sou	3	10th	18	4	14	8	0.222	Did not qualify	2nd round
2021–22	D2 Sou	3	11th	22	6	16	12	0.273	Did not qualify	3rd round
2022–23	D3 SW	4	1st	18	17	1	34	0.944	Semi-Finals	4th round
2023-24	D2 Sou	3	4th	22	13	9	26	0.591	Quarter-Finals	2nd round
2024-25	D2 Nor	3	7th	20	10	10	20	0.500	Did not qualify	-
