= Sevenoaks Suns =

- League: WBBL
- Established: 2005; 21 years ago
- History: Sevenoaks Suns; 2005-present (on hiatus)
- Arena: Surrey Sports Park Richard Meyjes Road Guildford GU2 7AD
- Location: Sevenoaks, Kent
- Head coach: (United States) Len Busch
- Championships: Multiple, see Honours

The Sevenoaks Suns are a basketball club and women's professional team from Sevenoaks, Kent, England. The Suns compete in the WBBL, the premier women's basketball competition in the United Kingdom, and are one of the most dominant teams in the women's domestic game. The team is currently on hiatus as of the 2023-24 season due to financial problems.

== Season-by-season records ==
Season	Division	Tier	Regular Season						Playoffs	National Cup
Season	Division	Tier	Finish	Played	Wins	Losses	Points	Win %	Playoffs	National Cup
Sevenoaks Suns
2009-10	NBL D1	1	7th	20	9	11	18	0.450		
2010-11	NBL D1	1	6th	21	7	14	14	0.333		
2011-12	NBL D1	1	6th	21	8	13	16	0.381		
2012-13	NBL D1	1	7th	18	7	11	14	0.389		
2013-14	NBL D1	1	5th	14	5	9	10	0.278		

Season	Division	Tier	Regular Season						Playoffs	WBBL Trophy	WBBL Cup	Head coach
Season	Division	Tier	Finish	Played	Wins	Losses	Points	Win %	Playoffs	WBBL Trophy	WBBL Cup	Head coach
Sevenoaks Suns
2014-15	WBBL	1	8th	18	5	13	10	0.278	Quarter-finals	Semi-finals	-	Len Busch
2015-16	WBBL	1	5th	16	7	9	14	0.438	Semi-finals	Quarter-finals	-	Len Busch
2016-17	WBBL	1	3rd	18	12	6	24	0.667	Winners	Winners	Semi-finals	Len Busch
2017-18	WBBL	1	1st	20	19	1	38	0.950	Winners	Runners-up	Quarter-finals	Len Busch
2018-19	WBBL	1	1st	22	22	0	44	1.000	Winners	Semi-finals	Runners-up	Len Busch
2019-20	WBBL	1	Season cancelled due to COVID-19 pandemic							Semi-finals	Winners	Len Busch
2020-21	WBBL	1	1st	20	19	1	38	0.950		Quarter-finals	Runners-up	Len Busch
2021-22	WBBL	1	2nd	24	21	3	42	0.84	Runners-up	Runners-up	Pools	Len Busch

== Honours ==
Women's British Basketball League

- Winners (3): 2017-2018, 2018-2019, 2020-2021,

WBBL Playoffs

- Winners (3): 2016-2017, 2017-2018, 2018–2019

WBBL Trophy

- Winners (1): 2016-2017

WBBL Cup

- Winners (1): 2019-2020

Girls' Junior National Titles

- Winners (24)

== Current roster ==
Shirt Number	Player name	Position	Height	Age	Date of birth	Nationality
3	Frankie Wurtz	G			1996-05-25	(United Kingdom)
4	Julia Koppl	F	190	31	1991-07-27	(Austria)
6	Alleke Allum	G			1996-06-29	(United Kingdom)
8	Renee Busch	G	180	30	1992-12-01	(United Kingdom)
11	Katie Richards	G	192	23	2000-04-18	(United Kingdom)
12	Janice Monakana	F	189	27	1995-08-06	(United Kingdom)
13	Zulieka Franklin	G			1998-11-28	(United Kingdom)
14	Amelia Watkins	F	188	37	1986-04-16	(United Kingdom)
15	Judit Fritz	G	189	35	1987-12-27	(Hungary)
22	Catherine Carr	G			2001-01-08	(United States)
35	Haylee Miller	G	193	25	1998-04-18	(United Kingdom)
41	Jamila Thompson	C			1999-09-10	(United Kingdom)
Team Averages
			188.71	29.71		
