= Basketball England =

English sport association

- Sport: Basketball
- Jurisdiction: England
- Founded: 1936; 90 years ago
- Headquarters: National Squash Centre, Manchester
- Chairperson: Paul Blanchard
- CEO: Victoria Ward

Official website
- www.basketballengland.co.uk

Basketball England is the governing body for the sport of basketball in England. It is responsible for overseeing the development, promotion, and administration of basketball throughout England.

The organisation operates the National Basketball League, as well as the England men's national basketball team and England women's national basketball team.

The headquarters of the organisation is at the National Squash Centre in Manchester. It is a non-profit organisation.

== History ==
Basketball England was founded in 1936 as the Amateur Basketball Association of England and Wales.

In 2006, the organisation, alongside Basketball Scotland and Basketball Wales, helped establish Great Britain Basketball.

In September 2014, the organisation announced a rebrand from England Basketball to Basketball England.

== Logo ==
The logo changed in 2014.

–2014

2014–present

== See also ==
- Basketball in England
- National Basketball League (England)
