= 2024–25 National Basketball League (England) season =

Sports competition season

2024–25 NBL season
- League: NBL England
- Sport: Basketball

2024–25

National Basketball League (England) seasons
- ← 2023–24 2025–26 →

The 2024–25 NBL season was the 53rd season of the National Basketball League and the 10th season of the competition under its current title.

== NBL Division 1 ==
=== Team changes ===
The following teams have changed division since the 2023–24 season:

Promoted from Division 2

- Bristol Hurricanes (D2 North)
- Milton Keynes Breakers (D2 South)

Relegated to Division 2

- London Elite (D2 South)
- Barking Abbey (D2 South)

Team change

- Thames Valley Cavaliers to London Cavaliers

=== Summary ===
The main honours were split between two teams; Hemel Storm won their second successive Division 1 league play-off title, with Reading Rockets winning the three knockout competitions; the National Cup, the KitKing Trophy and the Division 1 Playoffs. Bradford Dragons and Worthing Thunder would have been relegated.

Location of teams in 2024–25 NBL Division 1

Club	Location	Last season
Bradford Dragons	Bradford	7th
Bristol Hurricanes	Bristol	D2 North, 1st
City of Birmingham Rockets	Birmingham	9th
Derby Trailblazers	Derby	1st
Essex Rebels	Colchester	2nd
Hemel Storm	Hemel Hempstead	3rd
London Cavaliers	London (Uxbridge)	10th
Loughborough Riders	Loughborough	5th
Milton Keynes Breakers	Milton Keynes	D2 South, 1st
Newcastle Knights	Newcastle upon Tyne	6th
Nottingham Hoods	Nottingham	8th
Reading Rockets	Reading	4th
Worthing Thunder	Worthing	11th

=== Regular season ===
Pos	Team	Pld	W	L	GF	GA	GD	Pts	Qualification or relegation
1	Hemel Storm (C)	24	19	5	2190	2012	+178	38	Qualification to Playoffs
2	Derby Trailblazers	24	17	7	2074	1905	+169	34	Qualification to Playoffs
3	Reading Rockets	24	17	7	2149	1937	+212	34	Qualification to Playoffs
4	Milton Keynes Breakers	24	16	8	2140	1976	+164	32	Qualification to Playoffs
5	Loughborough Riders	24	14	10	1932	1904	+28	28	Qualification to Playoffs
6	Essex Rebels	24	14	10	1963	1884	+79	28	Qualification to Playoffs
7	London Cavaliers	24	10	14	2026	2064	−38	20	Qualification to Playoffs
8	Bristol Hurricanes	24	10	14	1967	1981	−14	20	Qualification to Playoffs
9	City of Birmingham Rockets	24	9	15	1934	2029	−95	18	
10	Nottingham Hoods	24	9	15	1989	2136	−147	18	
11	Newcastle Knights	24	8	16	1958	2064	−106	16	
12	Bradford Dragons	24	7	17	1954	2141	−187	14	
13	Worthing Thunder	24	6	18	2011	2254	−243	12	

Source: Basketball England Official Website
(C) Champions

=== Playoffs ===
Quarter-finals

12 Apr 2025

Milton Keynes Breakers	71–68	Loughborough Riders

12 Apr 2025

Hemel Storm	95–78	Bristol Hurricanes

13 Apr 2025

Derby Trailblazers	86–68	London Cavaliers

13 Apr 2025

Reading Rockets	94–74	Essex Rebels

Semi-finals

19 Apr 2025

Derby Trailblazers	83–95	Reading Rockets

19 Apr 2025

Hemel Storm	85–86	Milton Keynes Breakers

Final

27 Apr 2025

Report

Reading Rockets	102–91	Milton Keynes Breakers

== NBL Division 2 ==
=== Regular season ===
North
Pos	Team	Pld	W	L	GF	GA	GD	Pts
1	Bristol Flyers II (C, P)	22	20	2	1833	1615	+218	40
2	St Helens Saints	22	17	5	1861	1544	+317	34
3	Leicester Warriors	22	17	5	1849	1618	+231	34
4	Manchester Magic	22	15	7	1566	1441	+125	30
5	Derbyshire Arrows	22	15	7	1849	1749	+100	30
6	Myerscough College	22	11	11	1747	1648	+99	22
7	Cardiff Met Archers	22	10	12	1803	1743	+60	20
8	Worcester Wolves	22	9	13	1566	1710	−144	18
9	Teesside Lions	22	8	14	1553	1623	−70	14
10	Liverpool	22	4	18	1702	1897	−195	8
11	Bristol United (R)	22	4	18	1543	1816	−273	6
12	Cardiff City (R)	22	2	20	1445	1913	−468	4

Source: Basketball England Official Website
(C) Champions; (P) Promoted; (R) Relegated

South
Pos	Team	Pld	W	L	GF	GA	GD	Pts
1	Solent Kestrels (C)	22	19	3	2033	1556	+477	38
2	Barking Abbey	22	19	3	1748	1485	+263	38
3	London Stars	22	18	4	1993	1713	+280	36
4	NASSA	22	14	8	1840	1692	+148	28
5	London Elite	22	13	9	1763	1752	+11	26
6	Richmond Knights	22	11	11	1667	1692	−25	22
7	Greenwich Titans	22	10	12	1914	1955	−41	20
8	Barnet Bulldogs	22	10	12	1800	1912	−112	20
9	Cobham Cobras	22	6	16	1599	1841	−242	12
10	Essex Rebels II	22	5	17	1723	1907	−184	10
11	Westminster Warriors (R)	22	4	18	1639	1929	−290	8
12	Ipswich (R)	22	3	19	1678	1963	−285	6

Source: Basketball England Official Website
(C) Champions; (R) Relegated

=== Playoffs ===
Quarter-finals

05 Apr 2025

Barking Abbey	64–46	Leicester Warriors

05 Apr 2025

Bristol Flyers II	83–85	NASSA

05 Apr 2025

Solent Kestrels	82–74	Manchester Magic

06 Apr 2025

St Helens Saints	c–w	London Stars

Semi-finals

12 Apr 2025

Barking Abbey	82–60	NASSA

12 Apr 2025

Solent Kestrels	110–86	London Stars

Final

26 Apr 2025

Report

Solent Kestrels	83–62	Barking Abbey

== NBL Division 3 ==
=== Regular season ===
Pool I
Pos	Team	Pld	W	L	GF	GA	GD	Pts
1	Sheffield Sharks II	14	12	2	1118	844	+274	24
2	West Yorkshire Hawks	14	11	3	1229	901	+328	22
3	Tameside Vikings	14	11	3	1164	938	+226	22
4	Tees Valley Mohawks	14	9	5	1149	1059	+90	18
5	Sheffield Elite	14	6	8	1041	1087	−46	12
6	Stockport Falcons	14	3	11	1003	1229	−226	6
7	Cheshire Wire	14	3	11	933	1204	−271	6
8	Manchester Kings	14	1	13	889	1264	−375	2
9	Leeds LDM	0	0	0	0	0	0	0
10	Manchester Swarm	0	0	0	0	0	0	0

Source: Basketball England Official Website

Pool II
Pos	Team	Pld	W	L	GF	GA	GD	Pts
1	Birmingham City University	18	17	1	1721	1242	+479	34
2	Derby Trailblazers II	18	12	6	1471	1372	+99	24
3	Hertfordshire Storm	18	12	6	1496	1479	+17	24
4	Cambridge Cats	18	10	8	1513	1419	+94	20
5	Oaklands Wolves	18	10	8	1462	1420	+42	20
6	Northamptonshire Titans	18	8	10	1430	1505	−75	16
7	Charnwood Riders	18	8	10	1504	1492	+12	16
8	Nottingham Trent University	18	7	11	1440	1542	−102	14
9	Warwickshire Hawks	18	5	13	1361	1454	−93	10
10	University of East Anglia	18	1	17	1167	1640	−473	2

Source: Basketball England Official Website

Pool III
Pos	Team	Pld	W	L	GF	GA	GD	Pts
1	Oxford Hoops	18	14	4	1377	1159	+218	28
2	Crawley Storm	18	14	4	1554	1285	+269	28
3	Portsmouth Force	18	13	5	1493	1370	+123	26
4	Bath	18	12	6	1333	1201	+132	24
5	Plymouth Raiders	18	12	6	1302	1211	+91	24
6	Surrey Niners II	18	7	11	1341	1436	−95	14
7	Bracknell Cobras	18	6	12	1233	1328	−95	12
8	Brighton Bears	18	6	12	1310	1333	−23	12
9	Plymouth Marjon Patriots	18	5	13	1269	1429	−160	10
10	Cardiff Met Archers II	18	1	17	1153	1613	−460	2

Source: Basketball England Official Website

Pool IV
Pos	Team	Pld	W	L	GF	GA	GD	Pts
1	CoLA Southwark Pride	16	14	2	1251	956	+295	28
2	London Lions Foundation	16	13	3	1270	1037	+233	26
3	London United	16	12	4	1536	1269	+267	24
4	East London Phoenix	16	9	7	1165	1080	+85	18
5	Essex Charge	16	7	9	1256	1243	+13	14
6	London Sharks	16	7	9	1001	1084	−83	14
7	Kent Crusaders	16	6	10	1147	1218	−71	12
8	Greenhouse Sports	16	3	13	1092	1359	−267	6
9	Islington Panthers	16	1	15	656	1128	−472	2
10	Canterbury Crusaders	0	0	0	0	0	0	0

Source: Basketball England Official Website

=== Playoffs ===
Quarter-finals

05 Apr 2025

CoLA Southwark Pride	81–84	Crawley Storm

05 Apr 2025

Birmingham City University	82–58	Derby Trailblazers II

05 Apr 2025

Sheffield Sharks II	69–58	West Yorkshire Hawks

06 Apr 2025

Oxford Hoops	65–76	London Lions Foundation

Semi-finals

12 Apr 2025

Sheffield Sharks II	56–83	Crawley Storm

13 Apr 2025

Birmingham City University	102–86	London Lions Foundation

Final

26 Apr 2025

Report

Birmingham City University	85–92	Crawley Storm
