= 2023–24 National Basketball League (England) season =

2023–24 NBL season
- League: NBL England
- Sport: Basketball

2023–24

National Basketball League (England) seasons
- ← 2022–23 2024–25 →

The 2023–24 NBL season was the 52nd season of the National Basketball League and the 9th season of the competition under its current title.

114 teams competed across the three divisions of the league, which form the second, third and fourth tiers of the British basketball league system, an increase of 8 teams on the 2022–23 season.

== NBL Division 1 ==
=== Team changes ===
The following teams have changed division since the 2022–23 season:

Promoted from Division 2

- City of Birmingham Rockets (D2 North)
- London Elite (D2 South)

Relegated to Division 2

- Manchester Magic (D2 North)
- Westminster Warriors (D2 South)

Withdrew from league

- Solent Kestrels
Location of teams in 2023–24 NBL Division 1

Club	Location	Last season
Barking Abbey	London (Barking)	12th
Bradford Dragons	Bradford	7th
City of Birmingham Rockets	Birmingham	1st, D2 North
Derby Trailblazers	Derby	3rd
Essex Rebels	Colchester	11th
Hemel Storm	Hemel Hempstead	1st
London Elite	London (Harlesden)	1st, D2 South
Loughborough Riders	Loughborough	5th
Newcastle University	Newcastle upon Tyne	9th
Nottingham Hoods	Nottingham	10th
Reading Rockets	Reading	4th
Thames Valley Cavaliers	London (Uxbridge)	6th
Worthing Thunder	Worthing	2nd

=== Regular season ===
Pos	Team	Pld	W	L	GF	GA	GD	Pts	Qualification or relegation
1	Derby Trailblazers (C)	24	20	4	2314	1964	+350	40	Qualification to Playoffs
2	Essex Rebels	24	20	4	2102	1883	+219	40	Qualification to Playoffs
3	Hemel Storm	24	19	5	2322	1967	+355	38	Qualification to Playoffs
4	Reading Rockets	24	16	8	2078	1947	+131	32	Qualification to Playoffs
5	Newcastle University	24	14	10	2131	2136	−5	28	Qualification to Playoffs
6	Loughborough Riders	24	14	10	2043	2022	+21	28	Qualification to Playoffs
7	Bradford Dragons	24	11	13	2092	2111	−19	22	Qualification to Playoffs
8	Nottingham Hoods	24	11	13	2215	2272	−57	22	Qualification to Playoffs
9	City of Birmingham Rockets	24	9	15	2024	2095	−71	18	
10	Thames Valley Cavaliers	24	8	16	2047	2214	−167	16	
11	Worthing Thunder	24	7	17	1943	2096	−153	14	
12	Barking Abbey (R)	24	4	20	1813	2126	−313	8	Relegation to Division 2
13	London Elite (R)	24	3	21	1814	2105	−291	6	Relegation to Division 2

Source: Basketball England Official Website
(C) Champions; (R) Relegated

=== Playoffs ===
Quarter-finals

13 Apr 2024

Derby Trailblazers	108–67	Nottingham Hoods

13 Apr 2024

Essex Rebels	79–87	Bradford Dragons

13 Apr 2024

Hemel Storm	90–80	Loughborough Riders

14 Apr 2024

Reading Rockets	96–60	Newcastle University

Semi-finals

20 Apr 2024

Derby Trailblazers	84–87	Reading Rockets

20 Apr 2024

Hemel Storm	80–79	Bradford Dragons

Final

28 Apr 2024

Box score

Reading Rockets	84–87	Hemel Storm

=== Awards ===
- Player of the Year: Sam Masten (Derby Trailblazers)
- Coach of the Year: Matt Shaw (Derby Trailblazers)
- Defensive Player of the Year: Raheem May-Thompson (Derby Trailblazers)
- Young Player of the Year: Joe Buchanan (Bradford Dragons)
- Team of the Year:
  - Sam Masten (Derby Trailblazers)
  - Hakeem Sylla (Hemel Storm)
  - Malcolm Smith (Derby Trailblazers)
  - Luke Busumbru (Essex Rebels)
  - Justin Hopkins (Newcastle University)
- British Team of the Year:
  - Hakeem Sylla (Hemel Storm)
  - Hafeez Abdul (Worthing Thunder)
  - Luke Busumbru (Essex Rebels)
  - Mitch Clarke (Reading Rockets)
  - Justin Hedley (Loughborough Riders)

== NBL Division 2 ==
=== Regular season ===
North
Pos	Team	Pld	W	L	GF	GA	GD	Pts
1	Bristol Hurricanes (P)	22	20	2	1791	1475	+316	40
2	St Helens Saints	22	17	5	1885	1680	+205	34
3	Manchester Magic	22	14	8	1564	1479	+85	28
4	Teesside Lions	22	13	9	1804	1667	+137	26
5	Leicester Warriors	22	12	10	1852	1798	+54	24
6	Worcester Wolves	22	10	12	1648	1651	−3	20
7	Derbyshire Arrows	22	10	12	1821	1881	−60	20
8	Bristol United	22	9	13	1719	1768	−49	18
9	Myerscough College	22	9	13	1674	1732	−58	18
10	Bristol Flyers II	22	9	13	1702	1762	−60	18
11	Northamptonshire Titans (R)	22	6	16	1705	1883	−178	12
12	Doncaster Eagles (R)	22	3	19	1614	2003	−389	6

Source: Basketball England Official Website
(P) Promoted; (R) Relegated

South
Pos	Team	Pld	W	L	GF	GA	GD	Pts
1	Milton Keynes Breakers (P)	22	21	1	2402	1538	+864	42
2	Solent Kestrels	22	21	1	2151	1514	+637	42
3	Richmond Knights	22	16	6	1814	1623	+191	32
4	Cardiff Met Archers	22	13	9	1817	1776	+41	26
5	Cobham Scorchers	22	13	9	1723	1759	−36	26
6	Westminster Warriors	22	9	13	1810	1888	−78	18
7	Newham All-Stars	22	8	14	1485	1689	−204	16
8	Greenwich Titans	22	8	14	1600	1814	−214	16
9	London Stars	22	8	14	1663	1937	−274	16
10	Ipswich	22	7	15	1791	1878	−87	14
11	Brighton Bears (R)	22	5	17	1571	1780	−209	10
12	Oaklands Wolves (R)	22	3	19	1437	2068	−631	6

Source: Basketball England Official Website
(P) Promoted; (R) Relegated

=== Playoffs ===
Quarter-finals

13 Apr 2024

Bristol Hurricanes	95–64	Cardiff Met Archers

07 Apr 2024

St Helens Saints	81–80	Richmond Knights

13 Apr 2024

Milton Keynes Breakers	108–69	Teesside Lions

13 Apr 2024

Solent Kestrels	95–65	Manchester Magic

Semi-finals

20 Apr 2024

Bristol Hurricanes	51–110	Solent Kestrels

21 Apr 2024

Milton Keynes Breakers	110–66	St Helens Saints

Final

27 Apr 2024

Milton Keynes Breakers	86–68	Solent Kestrels

== NBL Division 3 ==
Basketball England announced proposed structure changes prior to the start of the 2023–24 season. Division 3 would be limited to forty teams from the 2024/25 season, with all Division 3 teams competing in 2023/24 for a spot in the 2024/25 structure. The remaining teams will form a new Conference League sitting under Division 3, with promotion and relegation taking place between the new Division 3 and Conference leagues via promotion playoffs.

=== Regular season ===
North
Pos	Team	Pld	W	L	Pts	
1	Leeds LDM	16	12	4	24	2024–25 Division 3
2	Tees Valley Mohawks	16	11	5	22	2024–25 Division 3
3	Charnwood Riders	16	10	6	20	2024–25 Division 3
4	West Yorkshire Hawks	16	10	6	20	2024–25 Division 3
5	Sheffield Sharks II	16	10	6	20	2024–25 Division 3
6	Sheffield Elite	16	8	8	16	2024–25 Conference
7	City of Leeds	16	4	12	8	2024–25 Conference
8	Team Sunderland	16	4	12	8	2024–25 Conference
9	Calderdale Explorers	16	2	14	4	2024–25 Conference

Source: Basketball England Official Website

North West
Pos	Team	Pld	W	L	Pts	
1	Liverpool	20	19	1	38	Promotion to 2024–25 Division 2
2	Cheshire Wire	20	16	4	32	2024–25 Division 3
3	Manchester Swarm	20	14	6	28	2024–25 Division 3
4	Tameside	20	12	8	24	2024–25 Division 3
5	Stockport Falcons	20	9	11	18	2024–25 Division 3
6	Manchester Kings	20	9	11	18	2024–25 Conference
7	Barrow Thorns	20	7	13	14	2024–25 Conference
8	Preston	20	7	13	14	2024–25 Conference
9	Manchester Giants II	20	7	13	14	2024–25 Conference
10	Myerscough College II	20	5	15	10	2024–25 Conference
11	Tameside Vikings	20	4	16	8	2024–25 Conference

Source: Basketball England Official Website

Midlands
Pos	Team	Pld	W	L	Pts	
1	Loughborough Riders II	14	13	1	26	2024–25 Division 3
2	Nottingham Trent University	14	12	2	24	2024–25 Division 3
3	Warwickshire Hawks	14	9	5	18	2024–25 Division 3
4	Derby Trailblazers II	12	6	6	12	2024–25 Division 3
5	Birmingham City University	14	6	8	12	2024–25 Conference
6	Coventry Flames	12	4	8	8	2024–25 Conference
7	Stourport Spartans	14	3	11	6	2024–25 Conference
8	Big Sky Dudley	12	0	12	0	2024–25 Conference

Updated to match(es) played on 03 April 2024. Source: Basketball England Official Website

East
Pos	Team	Pld	W	L	Pts	
1	Essex Rebels II	18	18	0	36	Promotion to 2024–25 Division 2
2	Hertfordshire Storm	18	13	5	26	2024–25 Division 3
3	Chelmsford Charge	18	12	6	24	2024–25 Division 3
4	Cambridge Cats	18	11	7	22	2024–25 Division 3
5	University of East Anglia	18	9	9	18	2024–25 Division 3
6	Anglia Ruskin University	18	8	10	16	2024–25 Conference
7	Bedford Thunder	18	7	11	14	2024–25 Conference
8	Northampton Mavericks	18	7	11	14	2024–25 Conference
9	Northamptonshire Titans II	18	4	14	8	2024–25 Conference
10	Oaklands Wolves II	18	1	17	2	2024–25 Conference

Source: Basketball England Official Website

London
Pos	Team	Pld	W	L	Pts	
1	East London Phoenix	18	16	2	32	2024–25 Division 3
2	Islington Panthers	18	14	4	28	2024–25 Division 3
3	London Sharks	18	14	4	28	2024–25 Division 3
4	London New City College	17	10	7	20	2024–25 Division 3
5	CoLA Southwark Pride	17	10	7	20	2024–25 Division 3
6	London Thunder	18	6	12	12	2024–25 Conference
7	London Westside	17	5	12	10	2024–25 Conference
8	Hackney Jedis	18	5	13	10	2024–25 Conference
9	Barking Abbey II	17	4	13	8	2024–25 Conference
10	Brixton Topcats	16	3	13	6	2024–25 Conference

Updated to match(es) played on 03 April 2024. Source: Basketball England Official Website

South
Pos	Team	Pld	W	L	Pts	
1	Barnet Bulldogs	20	19	1	38	Promotion to 2024–25 Division 2
2	Oxford Hoops	20	16	4	32	2024–25 Division 3
3	Greenhouse Sports	20	16	4	32	2024–25 Division 3
4	Surrey Scorchers II	20	14	6	28	2024–25 Division 3
5	London United	20	11	9	22	2024–25 Division 3
6	Reading Rockets II	20	9	11	18	2024–25 Division 3
7	West Herts Warriors	20	6	14	12	2024–25 Conference
8	Surrey Rams	20	5	15	10	2024–25 Conference
9	London Warriors	20	5	15	10	2024–25 Conference
10	London Elite II	20	4	16	8	2024–25 Conference
11	Winchester Royals	20	3	17	6	2024–25 Conference

Source: Basketball England Official Website

South East
Pos	Team	Pld	W	L	Pts	
1	Crawley Storm	12	11	1	22	2024–25 Division 3
2	Kent Crusaders	12	9	3	18	2024–25 Division 3
3	Portsmouth Force	12	7	5	14	2024–25 Division 3
4	Bracknell Cobras	12	6	6	12	2024–25 Division 3
5	Canterbury Crusaders	12	5	7	10	2024–25 Conference
6	Eastbourne Neptunes	12	4	8	8	2024–25 Conference
7	Brighton Bears II	12	0	12	0	2024–25 Conference

Source: Basketball England Official Website

South West
Pos	Team	Pld	W	L	Pts	
1	Cardiff City	14	13	1	26	Promotion to 2024–25 Division 2
2	Plymouth Marjon University	14	10	4	20	2024–25 Division 3
3	Plymouth Raiders	14	9	5	18	2024–25 Division 3
4	Bath	14	8	6	16	2024–25 Division 3
5	Cardiff Met Archers II	14	7	7	14	2024–25 Division 3
6	Gloucester City Kings	14	6	8	12	2024–25 Conference
7	Exeter Spartans	14	2	12	4	2024–25 Conference
8	Cornwall Titans	14	1	13	2	2024–25 Conference

Source: Basketball England Official Website

=== Playoffs ===
First Round

06 Apr 2024

Liverpool	93–77	Hertfordshire Storm

06 Apr 2024

Cardiff City	79–70	Kent Crusaders

06 Apr 2024

Crawley Storm	112–70	Greenhouse Sports

06 Apr 2024

Leeds LDM	72–110	Nottingham Trent Univ.

06 Apr 2024

Loughborough Riders II	99–92	Islington Panthers

06 Apr 2024

Barnet Bulldogs	109–102	Plymouth Marjon University

06 Apr 2024

East London Phoenix	76–67	Cheshire Wire

07 Apr 2024

Essex Rebels II	101–89	Tees Valley Mohawks

Quarter-finals

13 Apr 2024

Liverpool	75–68	Crawley Storm

13 Apr 2024

Cardiff City	79–81	Loughborough Riders II

13 Apr 2024

Essex Rebels II	69–57	Nottingham Trent Univ.

13 Apr 2024

Barnet Bulldogs	96–80	East London Phoenix

Semi-finals

20 Apr 2024

Barnet Bulldogs	97–78	Liverpool

20 Apr 2024

Essex Rebels II	77–71	Loughborough Riders II

Final

27 Apr 2024

Essex Rebels II	85–62	Barnet Bulldogs
