= Mitch Clarke (basketball) =

Australian basketball player (born 1999)

No. 41 – Newcastle Eagles
- Position: Point guard
- League: Super League Basketball

Personal information
- Born: 26 November 1999 (age 26)
- Listed height: 188 cm (6 ft 2 in)
- Listed weight: 88 kg (194 lb)

Career information
- High school: Scotch College (Perth, Western Australia)
- Playing career: 2017–present

Career history
- 2017–2021: Perry Lakes Hawks
- 2021–2023: Perth Wildcats
- 2022: Bendigo Braves
- 2023: Perry Lakes Hawks
- 2023–2025: Reading Rockets
- 2024: Bendigo Braves
- 2025: Warwick Senators
- 2025–present: Newcastle Eagles

Career highlights
- NBL England D1 playoff champion (2025); NBL England National Cup winner (2025); 2× SBL / NBL1 West champion (2018, 2021); NBL England D1 Team of the Year (2025); 2× NBL England D1 British Team of the Year (2024, 2025)

Mitchell Clarke (born 26 November 1999) is an Australian-British professional basketball player for the Newcastle Eagles of the British Super League Basketball. He played five seasons with the Perry Lakes Hawks in the NBL1 West before joining the Perth Wildcats of the Australian National Basketball League (NBL) in 2021, where he spent two seasons with their extended squad. He played for the Bendigo Braves of the NBL1 South in 2022 before returning to the Hawks in 2023. After a season with the Reading Rockets of the NBL England Division 1, he re-joined Bendigo in 2024.

== Early life ==
Clarke attended Scotch College in Perth, Western Australia, where he competed in athletics, basketball and football.

== Basketball career ==
=== SBL / NBL1 (2017–2025) ===
In 2017, Clarke debuted in the State Basketball League (SBL) for the Perry Lakes Hawks. He averaged 2.89 points, 1.32 rebounds and 1.04 assists in 28 games in his first season. In 2018, he helped the Hawks win the SBL championship. He averaged 6.39 points, 2.18 rebounds and 2.42 assists in 33 games in his second season. In 2019, he averaged 8.29 points, 3.82 rebounds and 2.89 assists in 28 games for the Hawks. In 2020, he helped the Hawks reach the grand final of the West Coast Classic. In 15 games, he averaged 10.87 points, 4.4 rebounds and 4.13 assists per game.

In the inaugural NBL1 West season in 2021, Clarke helped the Hawks win the championship. In 25 games, he averaged 13.12 points, 4.48 rebounds and 4.16 assists per game.

In 2022, Clarke joined the Bendigo Braves of the NBL1 South. In 21 games, he averaged 10.95 points, 4.24 rebounds, 3.52 assists and 1.57 steals per game.

Clarke returned to the Hawks for the 2023 NBL1 West season. On 30 June 2023, he scored 40 points with seven 3-pointers in a 95–94 win over the Willetton Tigers. In 23 games, he averaged 18.26 points, 4.3 rebounds, 4.78 assists and 1.78 steals per game.

Clarke returned to the Braves for the 2024 NBL1 South season. In 13 games, he averaged 18.23 points, 3.77 rebounds, 5.23 assists and 1.38 steals per game.

Clarke joined the Warwick Senators for the 2025 NBL1 West season. He helped the team reach the NBL1 West Grand Final, where they lost 81–78 to the Geraldton Buccaneers despite Clarke's 20 points. In 21 games, he averaged 18.62 points, 3.29 rebounds, 6.43 assists and 1.52 steals per game.

=== Perth Wildcats (2021–2023) ===
On 2 December 2021, Clarke signed with the Perth Wildcats of the Australian National Basketball League (NBL) as a development player for the 2021–22 season. He had been part of the Wildcats' academy and pre-season training squads since 2018 and impressed during the 2021 NBL Blitz pre-season tournament. He made his NBL debut on 5 December in the Wildcats' 90–67 win over the Cairns Taipans, playing the final two minutes of the game and recording one turnover. He played four games for the Wildcats during the season. He re-joined the Wildcats in 2022–23 as a training player.

=== Reading Rockets (2023–2025) ===
In August 2023, Clarke signed with the Reading Rockets of the NBL England Division 1 for the 2023–24 season. On 19 November 2023, he scored 31 points against the Essex Rebels. He helped the team reach the playoff final, where they lost 87–84 to Hemel Storm despite Clarke's 16 points. He was named to the NBL England D1 British Team of the Year after averaging 15.8 points, 4.6 rebounds and 4.8 assists per game.

In August 2024, Clarke re-signed with the Rockets for the 2024–25 season. On 19 January 2025, he had a triple-double with 14 points, 12 assists and 10 rebounds in the Rockets' 108–83 National Cup Final victory over Hemel Storm. On 26 January, he scored 39 points in a 105–92 win over the Derby Trailblazers. On 15 March, he scored 19 points in the Rockets' 97–75 KitKing Trophy Final victory over the Milton Keynes Breakers. On 27 April, he recorded 21 points and 14 assists in a 102–91 victory over Milton Keynes to win the NBL England D1 playoff title. He was named to the NBL England D1 Team of the Year and earned NBL England D1 British Team of the Year honours for the second straight year after averaging 17.8 points, 6.4 assists and 1.5 steals per game.

=== Newcastle Eagles (2025–present) ===
On 21 July 2025, Clarke signed with the Newcastle Eagles of the Super League Basketball (SLB). In the 2025–26 season, he appeared in all 32 SLB championship games and averaged 8.4 points, 3.3 rebounds and 3.2 assists in 24.2 minutes per game.

On 15 June 2026, Clarke re-signed with the Eagles for the 2026–27 SLB season.

== Personal life ==
Clarke is the son of Peter and Kerry, both of whom were born in the United Kingdom. His mother was a championship-winning assistant coach at the Perry Lakes Hawks.

Clarke has dual Australian and British citizenship and holds a British passport.
