= Bristol Hurricanes =

Bristol Hurricanes B.C.
- League: BCB
- Established: 2017; 9 years ago
- History: Hengrove Park (2017–2018); Bristol Hurricanes (2018–present)
- Location: Bristol, England
- Website: Official website

The Bristol Hurricanes are a basketball club, based in the city of Bristol in the south-west of England.

== History ==
The club was founded in 2017 as Hengrove Park, playing at the city's sports centre of the same name and entering into the local West of England League. Hengrove were immediately successful, winning Division 1 and the West of England Cup in their first season. Following from this success, the club entered the English Basketball League the following season and rebranded as the Bristol Hurricanes. The new name did not hinder the club's continued success, sweeping the South West League with a perfect 14-0 record, and finishing as runners-up in the National Playoffs. Following the reorganisation of the league in 2019, the Hurricanes were placed in Division 2 North, effectively being promoted 2 levels after just one season in the national system.

== Honours ==
- Men's Division 4 South West Champions (1): 2018-19
- West of England Cup (2): 2017-18, 2018-19
- European Amateur Basketball League Bristol Grand Prix (1): 2018-19

=== Current roster ===
Bristol Hurricanes 26-27 roster
Players
Coaches

Pos.	No.	Nat.	Name	Ht.
G		(United States)	Franklin, Gabe	6 ft 0 in (1.83 m)
G		(United Kingdom)	Samuels, Corey	6 ft 2 in (1.88 m)
G		(United States)	Flowers, Dennis	6 ft 2 in (1.88 m)
G		(United Kingdom)	Hill, Kobe	6 ft 2 in (1.88 m)
G		(United States) (United Kingdom)	Baker-McCann, Ben	6 ft 2 in (1.88 m)
G		(Wales)	Wells, Michael	6 ft 3 in (1.91 m)
G		(United Kingdom)	Landolfi, Pasquale	6 ft 4 in (1.93 m)
F		(United Kingdom)	Forsyth, David	6 ft 7 in (2.01 m)
F		(United States) (United Kingdom)	Phillips, Joshua	6 ft 8 in (2.03 m)

Head coach

Jimmy Bower

Legend

- (C) Team captain
- Injured

== Season-by-season records ==
Season	Division	Tier	Regular Season						Post-Season	National Cup
Season	Division	Tier	Finish	Played	Wins	Losses	Points	Win %	Post-Season	National Cup
Bristol Hurricanes
2018–19	D4 SW	5	1st	14	14	0	28	1.000	Runners Up	3rd round
2019–20	D2 Nor	3	10th	17	6	11	15	0.353	Did not qualify	3rd round
2020–21	D2 Nor	3	No season due to COVID-19 pandemic							
2021–22	D2 Nor	3	8th	22	9	13	18	0.409	Did not qualify	3rd round
2022–23	D2 Nor	3	4th	22	14	8	28	0.636	Quarter-finals	3rd round
2023–24	D2 Nor	3	1st	22	20	2	40	0.909	Semi-finals	
2024–25	D1	2								
