= 2022–23 National Basketball League (England) season =

Sports season

2022–23 NBL season
- League: NBL England
- Sport: Basketball
- Teams: 107

2022–23

National Basketball League (England) seasons
- ← 2021–22 2023–24 →

The 2022–23 NBL season was the 51st season of the National Basketball League. The season started on 25 September 2022 and ended on 23 April 2023.

== NBL Division 1 ==
=== Team changes ===
The following teams have changed division since the 2021–22 season:

Promoted from Division 2

- Manchester Magic (D2 North)
- Westminster Warriors (D2 South)

Relegated to Division 2

- Leicester Warriors (D2 North)
- Oaklands Wolves (D2 South)
Location of teams in 2022–23 NBL Division 1

Club	Location	Last season
Bradford Dragons	Bradford	9th
Derby Trailblazers	Derby	3rd
Essex Rebels	Colchester	12th
Hemel Storm	Hemel Hempstead	6th
Loughborough Riders	Loughborough	11th
London Lions II	London (Barking)	10th
Manchester Magic	Manchester	1st, D2 North
Newcastle University	Newcastle upon Tyne	7th
Nottingham Hoods	Nottingham	4th
Reading Rockets	Reading	8th
Solent Kestrels	Southampton	1st
Thames Valley Cavaliers	London (Uxbridge)	2nd
Westminster Warriors	London (Kensal Green)	1st, D2 South
Worthing Thunder	Worthing	5th

=== Regular season ===
Pos	Team	Pld	W	L	GF	GA	GD	Pts	Qualification or relegation
1	Hemel Storm (C)	26	26	0	2833	2098	+735	52	Qualification to Playoffs
2	Worthing Thunder	26	22	4	2436	2059	+377	44	Qualification to Playoffs
3	Derby Trailblazers	26	19	7	2350	2134	+216	38	Qualification to Playoffs
4	Reading Rockets	26	17	9	2268	2112	+156	34	Qualification to Playoffs
5	Loughborough Riders	26	15	11	2194	2176	+18	30	Qualification to Playoffs
6	Thames Valley Cavaliers	26	13	13	2289	2294	−5	26	Qualification to Playoffs
7	Bradford Dragons	26	13	13	2231	2207	+24	26	Qualification to Playoffs
8	Solent Kestrels	26	12	14	2137	2137	0	24	Qualification to Playoffs
9	Newcastle University	26	12	14	2158	2140	+18	24	
10	Nottingham Hoods	26	11	15	2275	2326	−51	22	
11	Essex Rebels	26	8	18	1971	2269	−298	16	
12	London Lions II	26	6	20	1914	2278	−364	12	
13	Westminster Warriors (R)	26	4	22	2037	2333	−296	8	Relegation to Division 2
14	Manchester Magic (R)	26	4	22	1803	2333	−530	8	Relegation to Division 2

Updated to match(es) played on 02 April 2023. Source: Basketball England Official Website
(C) Champions; (R) Relegated

Hemel Storm secured the league title with an unbeaten 26–0 record.

=== Season statistics ===
As of 02 April 2023

Scoring

Rank	Player	Club	PTS
1	(Canada) Aaryn Rai	Hemel Storm	620
2	(England) Joshua Guddemi	Nottingham Hoods	565
3	(United States) Jordan May	Newcastle University	533
4	(England) Jordan Whelan	Bradford Dragons	530
5	(United States) Taylor Johnson	Hemel Storm	530

Rebounds

Rank	Player	Club	REB
1	(Canada) Aaryn Rai	Hemel Storm	281
2	(Guyana) Hakeem Sylla	Hemel Storm	265
3	(United States) Ricky Madison	Solent Kestrels	237
4	(England) Joshua Guddemi	Nottingham Hoods	222
5	(England) Andre Gayle	Manchester Magic	217

Assists

Rank	Player	Club	AST
1	(England) Sam Newman	Hemel Storm	200
2	(United States) Ryan Bruggeman	Derby Trailblazers	185
3	(United States) David Moya	Worthing Thunder	145
4	(Canada) Aaryn Rai	Hemel Storm	143
5	(England) Elias Poorman	Solent Kestrels	135

=== Playoffs ===
Quarter-finals

8 Apr 2023

Report

Hemel Storm	117–76	Solent Kestrels

Hemel Hempstead

8 Apr 2023

Report

Worthing Thunder	83–73	Bradford Dragons

Worthing

8 Apr 2023

Derby Trailblazers	102–73	Thames Valley Cavaliers

Derby

8 Apr 2023

Report

Reading Rockets	99–77	Loughborough Riders

Reading

Semi-finals

15 Apr 2023

Report

Hemel Storm	89–86	Reading Rockets

Hemel Hempstead

15 Apr 2023

Report

Worthing Thunder	97–89	Derby Trailblazers

Worthing

Final

23 Apr 2023

Report

Hemel Storm	69–63	Worthing Thunder

National Basketball Centre, Manchester

== NBL Division 2 ==
=== Regular season ===
North
Pos	Team	Pld	W	L	GF	GA	GD	Pts
1	City of Birmingham Rockets (P)	22	21	1	1933	1504	+429	42
2	St Helens Saints	22	20	2	1737	1482	+255	40
3	Worcester Wolves	22	15	7	1609	1470	+139	30
4	Bristol Hurricanes	22	14	8	1734	1608	+126	28
5	Bristol Flyers II	22	12	10	1889	1821	+68	24
6	Derbyshire Arrows	22	9	13	1632	1778	−146	18
7	Leicester Warriors	22	8	14	1694	1758	−64	16
8	Doncaster Eagles	22	8	14	1632	1774	−142	16
9	Bristol United	22	9	13	1443	1587	−144	16
10	Myerscough College	22	7	15	1662	1710	−48	14
11	Charnwood Riders (R)	22	6	16	1539	1836	−297	12
12	Nottingham Trent University (R)	22	3	19	1686	1897	−211	6

Source: Basketball England Official Website
(P) Promoted; (R) Relegated

South
Pos	Team	Pld	W	L	GF	GA	GD	Pts
1	London Elite (P)	22	17	5	1879	1703	+176	34
2	Brighton Bears	22	16	6	1793	1550	+243	32
3	Ipswich	22	15	7	1867	1737	+130	30
4	Greenwich Titans	22	14	8	1767	1627	+140	28
5	Richmond Knights	22	13	9	1536	1504	+32	26
6	East London All-Stars	22	13	9	1843	1697	+146	26
7	Solent Kestrels II	22	12	10	1802	1734	+68	24
8	Baltic Stars Medelynas	22	11	11	1718	1795	−77	22
9	Northamptonshire Titans	22	7	15	1792	1922	−130	14
10	Oaklands Wolves	22	6	16	1654	1819	−165	12
11	Oxford Hoops (R)	22	5	17	1642	1844	−202	10
12	London Greenhouse Pioneers (R)	22	3	19	1572	1933	−361	6

Source: Basketball England Official Website
(P) Promoted; (R) Relegated

=== Playoffs ===
Quarter-finals

8 Apr 2023

Report

City of Birmingham Rockets	89–69	Greenwich Titans

Birmingham

8 Apr 2023

Report

London Elite	79–73	Bristol Hurricanes

London

8 Apr 2023

Report

St Helens Saints	109–75	Ipswich

Huyton

8 Apr 2023

Report

Brighton Bears	59–79	Worcester Wolves

Falmer

Semi-finals

15 Apr 2023

Report

City of Birmingham Rockets	70–55	Worcester Wolves

Birmingham

15 Apr 2023

Report

London Elite	69–78	St Helens Saints

London

Final

22 Apr 2023

Report

City of Birmingham Rockets	80–72	St Helens Saints

National Basketball Centre, Manchester

== NBL Division 3 ==
=== Regular season ===
North
Pos	Team	Pld	W	L	Pts
1	Teesside Lions (P)	18	18	0	36
2	Tees Valley Mohawks	18	14	4	28
3	Calderdale Explorers	18	12	6	24
4	Sheffield Elite	17	8	9	16
5	Nottingham Wildcats	18	6	12	12
6	Team Sunderland	17	3	14	6
7	Sheffield Elite II	18	0	18	0

Updated to match(es) played on 27 March 2023. Source: Basketball England Official Website
(P) Promoted

North West
Pos	Team	Pld	W	L	Pts
1	Myerscough College II	20	18	2	36
2	Manchester Swarm	20	16	4	32
3	Liverpool	20	15	5	30
4	Tameside	20	14	6	28
5	Preston	20	12	8	24
6	Manchester Kings	20	9	11	18
7	Barrow Thorns	20	6	14	12
8	Tameside Vikings	20	6	14	12
9	Manchester Giants II	20	6	14	12
10	Stockport Falcons	20	5	15	10
11	Cheshire Wire	20	2	18	4

Updated to match(es) played on 27 March 2023. Source: Basketball England Official Website

Midlands
Pos	Team	Pld	W	L	Pts
1	Loughborough Riders II	16	14	2	28
2	Derby Trailblazers II	16	12	4	24
3	Birmingham City University	16	11	5	22
4	West Bromwich	15	9	6	18
5	Coventry Flames	16	7	9	14
6	Stoke-on-Trent Knights	15	6	9	12
7	Warwickshire Hawks	16	6	10	12
8	Birmingham Mets	15	5	10	10
9	Stourport Spartans	15	0	15	0

Updated to match(es) played on 27 March 2023. Source: Basketball England Official Website

East
Pos	Team	Pld	W	L	Pts
1	Milton Keynes Breakers (P)	18	18	0	36
2	Univ. of Hertfordshire Storm	18	15	3	30
3	Kent Crusaders	18	13	5	26
4	Northampton Mavericks	18	8	10	16
5	Essex Rebels II	18	7	11	14
6	Bury St. Edmunds Bulldogs	18	7	11	14
7	Anglia Ruskin University	15	6	9	12
8	University of East Anglia	17	6	11	12
9	Canterbury Crusaders	16	4	12	8
10	Northamptonshire Titans II	18	3	15	6

Updated to match(es) played on 27 March 2023. Source: Basketball England Official Website
(P) Promoted

London
Pos	Team	Pld	W	L	Pts
1	UEL Lions	18	15	3	30
2	CoLA Southwark Pride	18	15	3	30
3	London Thunder	18	12	6	24
4	London Sharks	18	11	7	22
5	Brent Bulls	18	9	9	18
6	BA London Lions	18	8	10	16
7	Hackney Jedis	18	7	11	14
8	Brixton Topcats	18	6	12	12
9	NCC Lions	18	4	14	8
10	London Westside	18	3	15	6

Updated to match(es) played on 27 March 2023. Source: Basketball England Official Website

South
Pos	Team	Pld	W	L	Pts
1	Cobham Cobras (P)	20	19	1	38
2	London United	20	16	4	32
3	Worthing Thunder II	20	12	8	24
4	Surrey Scorchers II	20	11	9	22
5	Winchester Royals	20	10	10	20
6	Bracknell Cobras	20	9	11	18
7	London Warriors	18	8	10	16
8	Surrey Rams	20	7	13	14
9	Crawley Storm	19	5	14	10
10	Reading Rockets II	19	5	14	10
11	Brighton Bears II	20	5	15	10

Updated to match(es) played on 27 March 2023. Source: Basketball England Official Website
(P) Promoted

South West
Pos	Team	Pld	W	L	Pts
1	Cardiff Met Archers (P)	18	17	1	34
2	Cardiff City	18	15	3	30
3	Portsmouth Force	18	13	5	26
4	Exeter Spartans	18	10	8	20
5	Oxford University	18	10	8	20
6	Team Swindon	18	10	8	20
7	Bognor GSD	18	7	11	14
8	Plymouth Marjon University	18	5	13	10
9	Gloucester City Kings	18	2	16	4
10	Cardiff Met Archers II	18	1	17	2

Updated to match(es) played on 27 March 2023. Source: Basketball England Official Website
(P) Promoted

=== Playoffs ===
First Round

1 Apr 2023

Report

Loughborough Riders II	66–78	Manchester Swarm

Loughborough

1 Apr 2023

Report

UEL London Lions	94–63	University of Hertfordshire Storm

Newham

1 Apr 2023

Report

Cardiff City	71–67	CoLA Southwark Pride

Cardiff

2 Apr 2023

Report

Cardiff Met Archers	88–65	Tees Valley Mohawks

Cardiff

2 Apr 2023

Report

Milton Keynes Breakers	97–61	Kent Crusaders

Bletchley

2 Apr 2023

Report

Teesside Lions	70–49	Liverpool

Middlesbrough

2 Apr 2023

Report

Cobham Cobras	96–73	Derby Trailblazers II

Cobham

2 Apr 2023

Report

Myerscough College II	76–70	London United

Preston

Quarter-finals

8 Apr 2023

Report

Milton Keynes Breakers	107–70	Cardiff City

Bletchley

8 Apr 2023

Report

Cobham Cobras	82–68	Manchester Swarm

Guildford

8 Apr 2023

Report

Cardiff Met Archers	84–64	Myerscough College II

Cardiff

9 Apr 2023

Report

Teesside Lions	62–71	UEL London Lions

Middlesbrough

Semi-finals

15 Apr 2023

Report

Milton Keynes Breakers	99–56	Cardiff Met Archers

Bletchley

16 Apr 2023

Report

Cobham Cobras	68–71	UEL London Lions

Cobham

Final

22 Apr 2023

Report

Milton Keynes Breakers	113–67	UEL London Lions

National Basketball Centre, Manchester

== National Cup ==
National Cup

First Round

24 Sep 2022

Birmingham Mets	89–75	Northampton Mavericks

Birmingham

24 Sep 2022

Manchester Giants II	71–75	Sheffield Elite

Manchester

25 Sep 2022

Barking RDF Eagles	64–84	University of East Anglia

Barking

25 Sep 2022

Manchester Kings	81–56	Tameside Vikings

Manchester

Second Round

9 Oct 2022

Bracknell Cobras	67–51	Canterbury Crusaders

Bracknell

9 Oct 2022

Brent Bulls	50–53	Southwark Pride

Brent

9 Oct 2022

Calderdale Explorers	100–58	Stockport Falcons

Halifax

9 Oct 2022

Brixton Topcats	83–77	Kent Crusaders

Brixton

9 Oct 2022

Cardiff City	73–125	Bristol Flyers II

Cardiff

9 Oct 2022

City of Birmingham Rockets	74–75	Milton Keynes Breakers

Birmingham

9 Oct 2022

Doncaster Eagles	57–70	Worcester Wolves

Doncaster

9 Oct 2022

Exeter Spartans	64–55	Bristol United

Exeter

9 Oct 2022

Greenwich Titans	112–57	London Westside

Greenwich

9 Oct 2022

London Thunder	78–64	East London All-Stars

Lewisham

9 Oct 2022

London United	50–74	London Sharks

Northolt

9 Oct 2022

London Warriors	84–87	London Elite

London

9 Oct 2022

Oaklands Wolves	61–65	Anglia Ruskin University

St Albans

9 Oct 2022

Oxford Hoops	81–70	Warwickshire Hawks

Oxford

9 Oct 2022

Richmond Knights	70–76	Team Swindon

Richmond

9 Oct 2022

West Bromwich	65–85	St Helens Saints

Birmingham

9 Oct 2022

Surrey Scorchers II	72–63	London Lytas Academy

Guildford

9 Oct 2022

Preston	87–56	Manchester Kings

Preston

9 Oct 2022

Manchester Swarm	71–70	Liverpool

Manchester

9 Oct 2022

Teesside Lions	88–80	Sheffield Elite

Middlesbrough

9 Oct 2022

Birmingham City University	68–69	Myerscough College

Birmingham

9 Oct 2022

Leicester Warriors	117–68	Birmingham Mets

Leicester

9 Oct 2022

Nottingham Wildcats	71–69	Gloucester City Kings

Nottingham

9 Oct 2022

Bury St Edmunds Bulldogs	84–90	University of East Anglia

Bury St Edmunds

9 Oct 2022

Cobham Cobras	52–66	Bristol Hurricanes

Cobham

9 Oct 2022

Surrey Rams	76–71	Portsmouth Force

Cobham

10 Oct 2022

London Greenhouse Pioneers	77–73	Hackney Jedis

Kensington

Third Round

23 Oct 2022

Preston	91–56	Calderdale Explorers

Preston

23 Oct 2022

Manchester Swarm	74–84	Teesside Lions

Manchester

23 Oct 2022

Myerscough College	76–61	Worcester Wolves

Preston

23 Oct 2022

Leicester Warriors	101–76	St Helens Saints

Leicester

23 Oct 2022

Derbyshire Arrows	85–101	Milton Keynes Breakers

Dronfield

23 Oct 2022

Nottingham Wildcats	89–88	Oxford Hoops

Nottingham

23 Oct 2022

Northamptonshire Titans	98–88	Ipswich

Wellingborough

23 Oct 2022

Anglia Ruskin University	77–94	Southwark Pride

Cambridge

23 Oct 2022

Brixton Topcats	68–78	London Sharks

Brixton

23 Oct 2022

London Elite	79–72	Greenwich Titans

Harlesden

23 Oct 2022

University of East Anglia	77–50	Team Swindon

Norwich

23 Oct 2022

Bristol Hurricanes	73–81	Bristol Flyers II

Bristol

23 Oct 2022

Cardiff Met Archers	98–92	Bracknell Cobras

Cardiff

23 Oct 2022

Exeter Spartans	72–81	Brighton Bears

Exeter

30 Oct 2022

London Greenhouse Pioneers	60–63	London Thunder

Kensington

30 Oct 2022

Surrey Scorchers II	74–61	Surrey Rams

Guildford

Fourth Round

12 Nov 2022

Reading Rockets	98–90	Cardiff Met Archers

Reading

13 Nov 2022

Manchester Magic	92–61	Preston

Manchester

13 Nov 2022

Teesside Lions	77–85	Myerscough College

Peterlee

13 Nov 2022

Milton Keynes Breakers	86 (OT)–80	Bradford Dragons

Bletchley

13 Nov 2022

Nottingham Wildcats	66–111	Loughborough Riders

Nottingham

13 Nov 2022

Derby Trailblazers	89–69	Leicester Warriors

Derby

13 Nov 2022

Southwark Pride	67–73	Nottingham Hoods

Southwark

13 Nov 2022

Westminster Warriors	94–64	Northamptonshire Titans

Kensal Green

13 Nov 2022

London Elite	69–72	London Sharks

Harlesden

13 Nov 2022

University of East Anglia	62–51	London Thunder

Norwich

13 Nov 2022

Hemel Storm	102–80	Bristol Flyers II

Hemel Hempstead

13 Nov 2022

Essex Rebels	100–81	London Lions II

Colchester

13 Nov 2022

Thames Valley Cavaliers	101–85	Surrey Scorchers II

Uxbridge

13 Nov 2022

Worthing Thunder	123–65	Brighton Bears

Worthing

Fifth Round

1 Dec 2022

Myerscough College	60–64 (OT)	Manchester Magic

Preston

4 Dec 2022

Newcastle University	77–79	Milton Keynes Breakers

Newcastle

4 Dec 2022

University of East Anglia	66–81	London Sharks

Norwich

4 Dec 2022

Hemel Storm	106–77	Reading Rockets

Hemel Hempstead

4 Dec 2022

Solent Kestrels	80–83	Worthing Thunder

Southampton

4 Dec 2022

Thames Valley Cavaliers	89–57	Essex Rebels

Uxbridge

6 Dec 2022

Derby Trailblazers	92–70	Loughborough Riders

Derby

10 Dec 2022

Nottingham Hoods	78–66	Westminster Warriors

Nottingham

Quarter-finals

18 Dec 2022

Report

Milton Keynes Breakers	78–71	Manchester Magic

Bletchley

18 Dec 2022

Report

Nottingham Hoods	77–109	Derby Trailblazers

Nottingham

18 Dec 2022

Report

Hemel Storm	91–81	London Sharks

Hemel Hempstead

18 Dec 2022

Report

Worthing Thunder	79–71	Thames Valley Cavaliers

Worthing

Semi-finals

8 Jan 2023

Report
Boxscore

Hemel Storm	98–93	Milton Keynes Breakers

Hemel Hempstead

8 Jan 2023

Report
Boxscore

Worthing Thunder	79–84	Derby Trailblazers

Worthing

Final

22 Jan 2023
15:30

Report
Boxscore

Derby Trailblazers	81–102	Hemel Storm
Scoring by quarter: 20-19, 18–41, 27-25, 16–17
Pts: M. Smith (27); Rebs: M. Smith (10); Asts: R. Bruggeman (7)		Pts: T. Johnson (41); Rebs: A. Rai (10); Asts: S. Newman (16)

National Basketball Centre, Manchester
