= Creon Raftopoulos =

Zimbabwean basketball coach

Personal information
- Born: 17 October 1974 (age 52) Harare, Zimbabwe

Career information
- High school: Prince Edward High School
- Coaching career: 2006–present

Career history

Coaching
- 2006–2008: Teesside Mohawks
- 2010–2013: Guildford Heat
- 2015–2022: Surrey Scorchers

Creon Raftopoulos (born 17 October 1974) is a Zimbabwean professional basketball coach.

== Playing career ==
Raftopoulos captained the Zimbabwe national team during his playing career. In 2001, he moved to England to trial for the Teesside Mohawks. He sustained an injury in the first scrimmage game which ended his playing career.

== Coaching career ==
=== Early career ===
After sustaining the injury, Raftopoulos took up a coaching position at the Middlesbrough Basketball Academy. He was made head coach a year later.

=== Teesside Mohawks ===
In 2006, he was named head coach of the Teesside Mohawks and immediately helped the team return to the English Basketball Division One having recently suffered relegation. Raftopoulos also celebrated lifting the Patrons Cup in his first season with the team.

In June 2008, he announced he would step down from his position with the Mohawks for personal reasons. Raftopoulos cited his mother's cancer diagnosis as the reason for reconsidering his options, with his family all living in the south.

=== Guildford Heat ===
In 2010, he was named the head coach of the Guildford Heat – later rebranded as the Surrey Heat. Raftopoulos was named Coach of the Month in November, his second month in charge of the team. His first season saw the Heat finish in seventh and quality for the play-offs, before losing to Newcastle Eagles in the quarter-finals. He also guided the team to the BBL Trophy final in his first campaign, suffering an 84–66 defeat to league and play-off champions, the Mersey Tigers.

Guildford Heat qualified for the play-offs once again during the 2011–12 season under Raftopoulos, and improved to a fourth-placed finish the following year as the newly rebranded Surrey Heat. The performances saw Raftopoulos finish third in the BBL Coach of the Year awards.

In August 2013, he was sacked as head coach of the Surrey Heat amid a takeover deal. Raftopoulos revealed he had turned down offers from abroad over the summer to remain with the Heat, and was surprised by the announcement of his departure.

=== Surrey Scorchers ===
In 2015, the Surrey Heat, who had since become known as Surrey United, went through another rebrand under new ownership to become the Surrey Scorchers. On 1 July, Raftopoulos was named as the first head coach of the franchise's new era.

The Scorchers finished bottom during the 2015–16 season, but qualified for the play-offs the following year. The 2017–18 season saw Raftopoulos improve the Scorchers to a fifth-placed finish. In May 2018, he was named the Basketball Journalists Association's Coach of the Year after leading the Scorchers to their best season since reforming and securing an unbeaten home record in 2018.

== Personal life ==
Raftopoulos' parents were both involved in basketball. His father, Kimon, was the first black player to represent Rhodesia and went on to become the Commissioner of the Zimbabwean League after his retirement from playing. His mother, Juliette, was also capped for Rhodesia and later coached the women's national team.

His son, Caylin, is a professional basketball player who plays for the Surrey Scorchers under his father's coaching.
