= Josh Steel =

British basketball player (born 1997)

No. 12 – Surrey Scorchers
- Position: Guard
- League: British Basketball League

Personal information
- Born: 14 January 1997 (age 29) Harlow, Essex, England
- Listed height: 6 ft 5 in (1.96 m)
- Listed weight: 180 lb (82 kg)

Career information
- High school: Barking Abbey
- College: Duquesne University (2015–2017)
- NBA draft: 2017: undrafted
- Playing career: 2017–present

Career history
- 2011–2012: Essex Leopards
- 2013–2015: Kent Crusaders
- 2017–2018: Surrey Scorchers
- 2018–2019: Força Lleida
- 2019–2020: Morón
- 2020-2021: Clinica Ponferrada CDP
- 2021-2022: Manchester Giants
- 2022-2023: Surrey Scorchers

Joshua Steel (born 14 January 1997) is a British professional basketball player who currently plays for Surrey Scorchers in the British Basketball League.

== Early life ==
Steel attended Barking Abbey School and represented the Barking Abbey Basketball Academy. In 2012, he played 12 games for National Basketball League Division One team the Essex Leopards aged 14. He also spent two seasons playing semi-professionally with the Kent Crusaders between 2013 and 2015.

== College career ==
In 2015, Steel moved to the United States to join Duquesne University. He averaged 2.2 points, 0.7 assists, 0.8 rebounds and 0.2 steals per game in his freshman year, and averaged 9.5 points, 0.5 assists, 2.0 rebounds and 0.5 steals in his sophomore year.

== Professional career ==
In September 2017, Steel joined British Basketball League team the Surrey Scorchers.

== International career ==
Steel has represented England at U16 and U18 level, as well as Great Britain at U20 level. Josh successfully made the transition to the senior GB team and played at the EuroBasket Pre-Qualifiers.
