= ULEB Cup 2007–08 Regular Season Group A =

These are the Group A Results and Standings:

Key to colors
Top three places in each group, plus five highest-ranked four-places teams, advance to Top 32
Eliminated

== Standings ==
	Team	Pld	W	L	PF	PA	Diff
1.	(Spain) DKV Joventut	10	9	1	913	675	238
2.	(Turkey) Türk Telekom	10	9	1	920	831	89
3.	(Bosnia and Herzegovina) KK Bosna	10	4	6	860	880	-20
4.	(Lithuania) Šiauliai	10	4	6	781	826	-45
5.	(Germany) ALBA Berlin	10	4	6	790	815	-25
6.	(United Kingdom) Guildford Heat	10	0	10	689	926	-237

== Results/Fixtures ==
All times given below are in Central European Time.

=== Game 1 ===
November 6, 2007

November 6
17:45

Šiauliai (Lithuania)	90–97	(Turkey) Türk Telekom
Scoring by quarter: 24-22, 25-25, 16-28, 25-22

Šiauliai

November 6
20:15

KK Bosna (Bosnia and Herzegovina)	84–68	(United Kingdom) Guildford Heat
Scoring by quarter: 29-11, 18-26, 17-15, 20-16

Sarajevo

November 6
20:45

DKV Joventut (Spain)	79–67	(Germany) ALBA Berlin
Scoring by quarter: 24-12, 15-24, 19-19, 21-12

Badalona

=== Game 2 ===
November 13, 2007

November 13
18:00

Türk Telekom (Turkey)	95–82	(Bosnia and Herzegovina) KK Bosna
Scoring by quarter: 17-13, 30-17, 29-27, 19-25

Ankara

November 13
19:30

ALBA Berlin (Germany)	85–70	(Lithuania) Šiauliai
Scoring by quarter: 20-18, 27-22, 23-12, 15-18

Berlin

November 13
20:30

Guildford Heat (United Kingdom)	61–95	(Spain) DKV Joventut
Scoring by quarter: 13-27, 19-21, 16-30, 13-17

Guildford

=== Game 3 ===
November 20, 2007

November 20
17:40

Šiauliai (Lithuania)	85–76	(Bosnia and Herzegovina) KK Bosna
Scoring by quarter: 22-22, 21-24, 17-17, 25-13

Šiauliai

November 20
19:30

ALBA Berlin (Germany)	81–63	(United Kingdom) Guildford Heat
Scoring by quarter: 23-12, 21-15, 19-14, 18-22

Berlin

November 20
20:45

DKV Joventut (Spain)	102–83	(Turkey) Türk Telekom
Scoring by quarter: 31-12, 30-23, 21-23, 20-25

Badalona

=== Game 4 ===
November 27, 2007

November 27
17:40

Šiauliai (Lithuania)	87–72	(United Kingdom) Guildford Heat
Scoring by quarter: 24-10, 20-21, 19-21, 24-20

Šiauliai

November 27
18:15

Türk Telekom (Turkey)	82–71	(Germany) ALBA Berlin
Scoring by quarter: 24-18, 22-18, 15-24, 21-11

Ankara

November 27
20:15

KK Bosna (Bosnia and Herzegovina)	68–85	(Spain) DKV Joventut
Scoring by quarter: 18-23, 17-21, 15-24, 18-17

Sarajevo

=== Game 5 ===
December 4, 2007

December 4
19:30

ALBA Berlin (Germany)	141–127 (OT) (OT)	(Bosnia and Herzegovina) KK Bosna
Scoring by quarter: 16-15, 21-21, 16-21, 18-14, Overtime: 11-11, 15-15, 14-14, 11-11, 19-5

Berlin

December 4
20:30

Guildford Heat (United Kingdom)	67–107	(Turkey) Türk Telekom
Scoring by quarter: 23-32, 19-24, 10-27, 15-24

Guildford

December 4
20:45

DKV Joventut (Spain)	90–65	(Lithuania) Šiauliai
Scoring by quarter: 22-20, 22-18, 27-18, 19-9

Badalona

=== Game 6 ===
December 11, 2007

December 11
19:30

Türk Telekom (Turkey)	102–99 (OT)	(Lithuania) Šiauliai
Scoring by quarter: 21-27, 28-18, 25-23, 16-22, 12-9

Ankara

December 11
20:30

ALBA Berlin (Germany)	65–80	(Spain) DKV Joventut
Scoring by quarter: 16-23, 16-19, 14-20, 1918

Berlin

December 11
20:45

Guildford Heat (United Kingdom)	85–98	(Bosnia and Herzegovina) KK Bosna
Scoring by quarter: 23-24, 23-16, 20-24, 19-34

Guildford

=== Game 7 ===
December 18, 2007

December 18
17:40

Šiauliai (Lithuania)	71–51	(Germany) ALBA Berlin
Scoring by quarter: 19-13, 20-6, 15-19, 17-13

Šiauliai

December 18
20:15

KK Bosna (Bosnia and Herzegovina)	80–85	(Turkey) Türk Telekom
Scoring by quarter: 20-12, 21-27, 12-15, 27-31

Sarajevo

December 18
20:45

DKV Joventut (Spain)	116–53	(United Kingdom) Guildford Heat
Scoring by quarter: 31-18, 32-14, 29-10, 24-11

Badalona

=== Game 8 ===
January 8–9, 2008

January 8
18:15

Türk Telekom (Turkey)	96–94	(Spain) DKV Joventut
Scoring by quarter: 17-30, 22-16, 27-24, 30-24

Ankara

January 8
20:30

Guildford Heat (United Kingdom)	71–80	(Germany) ALBA Berlin
Scoring by quarter: 23-15, 16-28, 14-16, 18-21

Guildford

January 9
20:15

KK Bosna (Bosnia and Herzegovina)	88–77	(Lithuania) Šiauliai
Scoring by quarter: 19-19, 21-19, 24-20, 24-19

Sarajevo

=== Game 9 ===
January 15, 2008

January 15
19:30

ALBA Berlin (Germany)	73–81	(Turkey) Türk Telekom
Scoring by quarter: 23-23, 16-24, 18-18, 16-16

Berlin

January 15
20:30

Guildford Heat (United Kingdom)	76–86	(Lithuania) Šiauliai
Scoring by quarter: 25-15, 11-18, 18-27, 22-26

Guildford

January 15
20:45

DKV Joventut (Spain)	83–66	(Bosnia and Herzegovina) KK Bosna
Scoring by quarter: 10-15, 21-14, 31-25, 21-12

Badalona

=== Game 10 ===
January 22, 2008

January 22
19:00

KK Bosna (Bosnia and Herzegovina)	91–76	(Germany) ALBA Berlin
Scoring by quarter: 13-16, 21-24, 28-21, 29-15

Sarajevo

January 22
19:00

Türk Telekom (Turkey)	92–73	(United Kingdom) Guildford Heat
Scoring by quarter: 20-22, 14-17, 36-16, 22-18

Ankara

January 22
19:00

Šiauliai (Lithuania)	51–89	(Spain) DKV Joventut
Scoring by quarter: 17-16, 17-28, 3-21, 14-24

Šiauliai
