= Caylin Raftopoulos =

British basketball player

No. 10 – Surrey Scorchers
- Position: Point guard
- League: British Basketball League

Personal information
- Born: 19 October 1992 (age 34) London, England
- Listed height: 5 ft 8 in (1.73 m)

Career information
- High school: Arlington Country Day (Jacksonville, Florida); Althoff Catholic (Belleville, Illinois)
- College: Worcester (2013–2015); Southampton Solent (2016–2017)
- NBA draft: 2014: undrafted
- Playing career: 2012–present

Career history
- 2012–2013: Surrey Heat
- 2013–2015: Worcester Wolves
- 2016–2017: Solent Kestrels
- 2017–present: Surrey Scorchers

Career highlights
- BBL champion (2014); BBL Trophy winner (2014)

Caylin Raftopoulos (born 19 October 1992) is a British professional basketball player for the Surrey Scorchers in the British Basketball League.

== Early life ==
Raftopoulous took part in the London Towers programme before playing youth basketball with the Spelthorne Atoms and London United-Richmond College. In 2010, he moved to the United States to attend Arlington Country Day High School and later transferred to Althoff Catholic High School.

== Professional career ==
Raftopoulous began his professional career with the Surrey Heat, a team coached by his father, Creon Ratfopoulous. He played 35 times during the 2012–13 season and averaged 5.3 points per game.

After relocating for university, he joined the Worcester Wolves in 2013. Spending two years with the British Basketball League team, he averaged 1.5 and 2.3 points per game. In October 2015, Raftopoulous was named the Wolves' second team head coach but would continue to train with the first team squad.

Relocating again for the 2016–17 season, he represented Team Solent Kestrels in the National Basketball League while studying at Southampton Solent University.

In September 2017, he rejoined his father to play for the renamed Surrey Scorchers in the British Basketball League. Raftopoulous re-signed with the team in September 2020.
