= E. J. Harrison (basketball) =

American basketball player (born 1976)

Personal information
- Born: June 22, 1976 (age 49) Danbury, Connecticut, U.S.
- Listed height: 6 ft 1 in (1.85 m)

Career information
- College: Western Connecticut State University (1994–1996); University of Connecticut (1997–1999)
- Playing career: 1999–2014
- Position: Guard

Career history
- 1999–2004: Teesside Mohawks
- 2004–2006: Reading Rockets
- 2007: Tees Valley Mohawks
- 2007–2009: Guildford Heat
- 2009–2010: Milton Keynes Lions
- 2010–2014: Glasgow Rocks

Elmer L. "EJ" Harrison Jr. (born June 22, 1976) is an American former professional basketball player. A 6 foot 1 inch guard, Harrison was part of the 1998–99 Connecticut Huskies men's basketball team who won the 1999 NCAA Division I men's basketball tournament. Harrison spent most of his professional career in the United Kingdom.

== College career ==
Harrison played collegiately at Western Connecticut State University for two seasons before transferring to the University of Connecticut. At UConn, he was a member of the Connecticut Huskies men's basketball team that won the 1999 NCAA Division I men's basketball tournament. At WCSU, he was the Little East Conference Rookie of the Year for the 1994–95 season and a conference first team member for the 1995–96 season.

== Professional career ==
Following his collegiate career, Harrison has played professionally, primarily in England. He played for the Teesside Mohawks from 1999 to 2000 and 2001–2004, the Reading Rockets from 2004 to 2006, and the since-renamed Tees Valley Mohawks in 2007.

From 2007 to 2009, he played for Guildford Heat. In Harrison's first season there, he won the BBL Trophy, where he was named the Most Valuable Player in the final, and the BBL Play-offs. He was also named in the league's team of the year. In his second season, the Heat finished as runners-up in the BBL Trophy.

Harrison played for the Milton Keynes Lions in the 2009–2010 season.

In 2010, Harrison signed for Scotland's Glasgow Rocks where he was the team's captain. In his final season there, Harrison struggled with injuries and the Rocks finished as runners-up in the BBL Trophy.

Harrison retired following the 2013–14 season.
