= Liverpool Basketball Club =

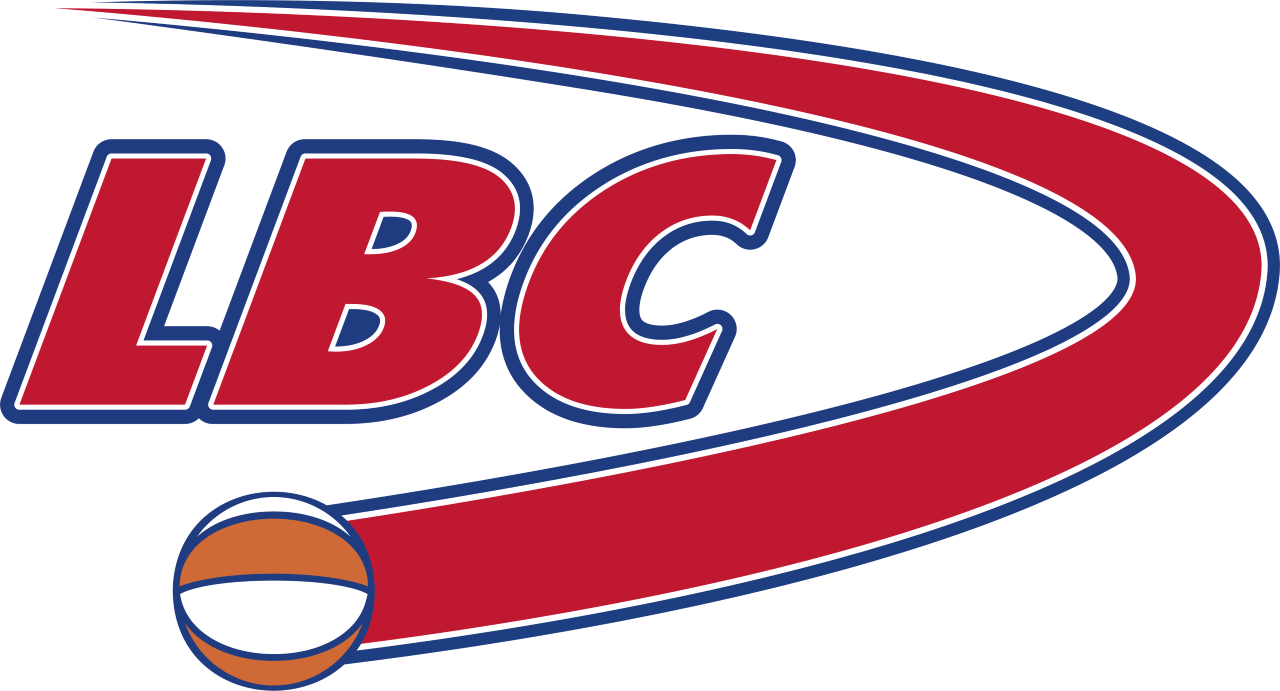
- League: NBL Division 1
- Established: 1969; 57 years ago
- History: Atac; 1969–1973; Riversdale Atac; 1973–1991; Liverpool Atac; 1991–2000; Liverpool; 2000–present
- Arena: Archbishop Beck College
- Capacity: 250
- Location: Liverpool, England
- Team colours
- Head coach: (England) Tony Walsh
- Website: Official website

Liverpool Basketball Club are a basketball club from the city of Liverpool, England.

The Men's first team compete in the National Basketball League Division 1 North, and the club has youth teams competing in the NBL U18, U16, U14 and U12 Regional Divisions. Their main home court is the Archbishop Beck Catholic Sports College, but they can also play at the Archbishop Beck Community Sports & Tennis Centre.

== History ==
The club was founded by Jimmy Rogers and Tim Martyn-Jones as a Junior section to the local YMCA basketball team, playing under the name 'Atac' to reflect the flowing, attacking style of basketball they aimed for the team to play. The team became independent in 1973 and moved to play their home games at the local Riversdale College, changing their name to Riversdale Atac to reflect their new home base. The club then competed in the local Merseyside League and the North West Counties League for many years before turning their eyes towards national level competition.

In the late 1980s, the club sought to expand its reach in the community as a precursor to entering the National League, moving its home games to the more suitable Everton Park Sports Centre and renaming themselves Liverpool Atac to attract players from a wider area. As part of their preparations, the club also started to compete in the National Founders Cup, and came up just short of carving their name onto the non-league trophy in 1991 and 1992, finishing as runners-up in both seasons. The club then entered NBL Division 3 for the 1992/1993 season, earning promotion to Division 2 in their first season. Three years later, a third-place finish was enough to secure a place in NBL Division 1 for the 1996/1997 season, but the retirement of a number of senior players meant that their stay in the top English division was brief, lasting only a single season.

After several more years in NBL Division 2, the club moved to the newly constructed Greenbank Sports Academy in the early 2000s, which coincided with a re-organisation of the English National Basketball League. This saw the club awarded a place in the new NBL Division 1 (now forming the tier below the NBL Conference), but once again the club struggled to maintain its position in the league, finishing bottom in consecutive seasons. The club was reprieved after the 2000/2001 season due to the league's expansion, but they were relegated to NBL Division 2 (North) following their last-place finish in 2001/2002. The club then went the 2002/2003 season unbeaten on their way to a league and playoff double to earn promotion to the second English tier again, just in time for a second league restructure in five years to see the division rebranded as NBL Division 2.

Arguably the club's highest honour to date occurred in 2005/2006, when they lifted the Patrons Cup following a thrilling 85–83 overtime win over the West Hertfordshire Warriors at the Amaechi Basketball Centre. However, another exodus of experienced players to the newly formed Mersey Tigers saw the club finish bottom in NBL Division 2 in 2006/2007, and then finish bottom again in NBL Division 3 in 2007/2008 to suffer back-to-back relegations and end in the bottom tier of national competition. The club's strong development base enabled them to survive without dropping back to the regional leagues, but they struggled badly for several years, generally finishing in the lower reaches of EBL Division 4 (North).

A move to the Archbishop Beck Catholic Sports College and a new coach in the 2013/2014 season saw the club's fortunes finally turn for the better, winning promotion with an unbeaten campaign that took in the league and playoff titles. A second success was to follow immediately after, as they won another league and playoff double in their first season back in NBL Division 3, returning to NBL Division 2 for the 2015/2016 season. They struggled in their first season in Division 2, finishing in 7th place, but had a very successful playoff campaign, becoming Division 2 playoff champions in 2016 by defeating Solent Kestrels in the playoff final at the new Basketball Performance Centre in Manchester.

== Honours ==
NBL Division 2 (North) League Champions

- 2003

NBL Division 2 Playoff Champions

- 2003

Patrons Cup

- 2006

NBL Division 4 (North) League Champions

- 2014

NBL Division 4 Playoff Champions

- 2014

NBL Division 3 (North) League Champions

- 2015

NBL Division 3 Playoff Champions

- 2015

NBL Division 2 Playoff Champions

- 2016

NBL Division 2 League Champions

- 2019

NBL Division 2 Playoff Champions

- 2019

NBL Division 3 North West Conference Champions.

- 2024

== Season-by-season records ==
Season	Division	Tier	Pos	Played	Won	Lost	Points	Win %	Playoffs	Nat. Cup	Nat. Trophy	Patrons Cup	Nat. Shield
Liverpool Atac
1992-93	D3	4	4th	20	13	7	26	0.650	Semi-Final	1st Round	2nd Round	-	-
1993-94	D2	3	5th	20	12	8	24	0.600	Qtr-Final	1st Round	1st Round	-	-
1994-95	D2	3	4th	20	12	8	24	0.600	Qtr-Final	1st Round	1st Round	-	-
1995-96	D2	3	3rd	24	17	7	34	0.708	Qtr-Final	1st Round	1st Round	-	-
1996-97	D1	2	13th	26	6	20	12	0.231	DNQ			-	-
1997-98	D2	3	11th	24	9	15	18	0.375	DNQ		1st Round	-	-
1998-99	D2	3	5th	24	16	8	32	0.667	Semi-Final		2nd Round	-	-
1999-00	D2	3	2nd	24	18	6	36	0.750	Semi-Final		3rd Round	-	-
Liverpool
2000-01	D1	3	7th	18	2	16	4	0.111	Qtr-Final		1st Round	-	DNE
2001-02	D1	3	12th	22	3	19	6	0.136	DNQ		1st Round	-	DNE
2002-03	D2 Nor	4	1st	18	18	0	36	1.000	Winners		DNE	-	Semi-Final
2003-04	D2	3	3rd	20	13	7	26	0.650	Qtr-Final	Qtr-Final	DNE	1st Round	DNE
2004-05	D2	3	5th	20	9	11	18	0.450	Semi-Final	1st Round	DNE	1st Round	DNE
2005-06	D2	3	5th	22	11	11	22	0.500	Qtr-Final	3rd Round	DNE	Winners	DNE
2006-07	D2	3	12th	22	3	19	6	0.136	DNQ	1st Round	DNE	1st Round	DNE
2007-08	D3 Nor	4	11th	20	0	20	0	0.000	DNQ	1st Round	DNE	DNE	2nd Round
2008-09	D4 Nor	5	10th	19	2	17	4	0.105	DNQ		DNE	DNE	1st Round
2009-10	D4 Nor	5	10th	18	2	16	4	0.111	DNQ		DNE	DNE	
2010-11	D4 Nor	5	13th	23	1	22	2	0.043	DNQ		DNE	DNE	
2011-12	D4 Nor	5	8th	22	10	12	20	0.455	DNQ		DNE	DNE	
2012-13	D4 Nor	5	8th	12	1	11	2	0.083	DNQ		DNE	DNE	
2013-14	D4 Nor	5	1st	14	14	0	28	1.000	Winners		DNE	DNE	
2014-15	D3 Nor	4	1st	22	20	2	22	0.909	Winners	2nd Round	DNE	DNE	Runner-Up
2015-16	D2	3	7th	22	12	10	24	0.545	Winners	2nd Round	DNE	Semi-Final	DNE
2016-17	D2	3	10th	22	7	15	14	0.318	DNQ	3rd Round	DNE	1st Round	DNE
2017-18	D2	3	3rd	22	15	7	30	0.682	Semi-Final	4th Round	DNE	1st Round	DNE
2018-19	D2	3	1st	20	20	0	40	1.000	Winners	4th Round	DNE	Semi Finals	DNE
2019-20	D1	2	14th	24	3	21	6	0.125	DNQ	4th Round	N/A	N/A	N/A
2021-22	D3 NW	4	3rd	20	14	6	28	0.700	Last 16	2nd Round	N/A	N/A	N/A
2022-23	D3 NW	4	3rd	20	15	5	30	0.750	Last 16	1st Round	N/A	N/A	N/A
2023-24	D3 NW	4	1st	20	19	1	38	0.950	Semi-Final	2nd Round	N/A	N/A	N/A
2024-25	D2 North	3	10th	22	4	18	8	0.180	N/A	2nd Round	N/A	N/A	N/A
