= Gloucester City B.C. =

- League: Men: NBL Division 3 SW
- Founded: 10 June 2021; 4 years ago
- Location: Gloucester, England
- Website: Official website

Gloucester City Basketball Club are a professional basketball club based in Gloucester, England.

== History ==
In June 2021, Alex Petheram announced the launch of professional basketball in Gloucester along with the appointment of Jay Marriott as CEO and coach.

As part of this, the Kings (men) and Queens (women) were announced as the city's new professional basketball teams. In the same month, the Queens were announced to be making their debut in the WBBL in the 2021–22 season.

== Women's team ==
The Queens competed in the 2021–22 season of the Women's British Basketball League (WBBL), the highest division of women's basketball competition in the United Kingdom. The team withdrew shortly before the commencement of the 2022-23 season.

=== Season-by-season records ===
Season	Division	Tier	Regular Season						Post-Season	WBBL Trophy	WBBL Cup	Head coach
Season	Division	Tier	Finish	Played	Wins	Losses	Points	Win %	Post-Season	WBBL Trophy	WBBL Cup	Head coach
Gloucester City Queens
2021-22	WBBL	1	13th	24	3	21	6	0.125	Did not qualify	1st round	Group stage	Jay Marriott

== Men's team ==
The Kings joined the National Basketball League (NBL) for the 2022-23 season.

=== Season-by-season records ===
Season	Division	Tier	Regular Season						Post-Season	National Cup	Head coach
Season	Division	Tier	Finish	Played	Wins	Losses	Points	Win %	Post-Season	National Cup	Head coach
Gloucester City Kings
2022-23	D3 SW	4	9th	18	2	16	4	0.111	Did not qualify	2nd round	Adam Stacey
2023-24	D3 SW	4	6th	14	6	8	12	0.429	Did not qualify		Jimmy Bower
