= Chad McKnight =

American basketball player

Personal information
- Born: June 19, 1983 (age 43) Lancaster, Ohio
- Listed height: 6 ft 8 in (2.03 m)
- Listed weight: 215 lb (98 kg)

Career information
- High school: Lancaster (Lancaster, Ohio)
- College: Morehead State (2001–2005)
- NBA draft: 2005: undrafted
- Position: Forward

Chad McKnight (born June 19, 1983 in Lancaster, Ohio) is an American professional basketball player, who has signed as the Player-Coach for the 2009-10 British Basketball League season with the Guildford Heat.

The 6 ft 8 in (2.03 m) Forward was educated at Morehead State University, where he starred for the Eagles basketball team from 2003 to 2005. During his first season, McKnight averages 26.7 mins per game, while posting up 10.6 points per game and 5.1 rebounds. His second and final season with the Eagles was a progressive improvement, where he played an average of 31.4 mins per game, scoring 16.4 points per game and shooting 63% from the floor.

McKnight left Morehead in 2005, before signing his first professional contract with Guildford Heat in 2005. His first season, the franchise's inaugural campaign, saw McKnight average just 11.15 points per game in all 40 games. However it was his second season where he would make his mark on the British hoops scene. In 19 games, McKnight averaged 12 points per game, including a 39-point haul against Plymouth Raiders on November 11, 2006 in the BBL Cup quarter-final.

After a respectable start to the season, McKnight suffered a huge blow when a knee injury in the game against Sheffield Sharks on February 3, 2007 effectively ruled the American out for the remainder of the campaign. McKnight was subsequently released, for the long-term injury.

Following a full recovery from injury, McKnight agreed a deal with the Leicester Riders, with whom he played for in the 2007-08 season, before returning to the Guildford Heat in the 2008-09 season.

On Wednesday 8 July 2009, it was announced that he will assume the role of Player/Coach following the departure of Paul James.

After one season in charge of the Heat, McKnight left the club in both the playing and coaching roles.
