= Barking Abbey Basketball Academy =

Barking Abbey
- League: Men: NBL D1; Women: WBBL
- Established: 2005; 21 years ago
- History: Barking Abbey (2005–present)
- Arena: Barking Abbey School
- Location: London, England
- Head coach: (United Kingdom) James Vear
- Website: Official website

The Barking Abbey Basketball Academy is an elite 16–19 basketball academy, based at Barking Abbey School in London, England.

== History ==
The school established the basketball academy in 2005, after recognising the lack of elite development opportunities for young players in Britain. Almost unique in British basketball and more similar in structure to a European-style system, the full-time academy is a leading developer of young British talent, many of whom go on to further develop in the NCAA or European academies.

The academy hosted the Nike Junior Euroleague Invitational Tournament in 2010, and was named as the first Great Britain Regional Institute of Basketball in 2011.

== Men's team ==
As of the 2019–20 season the men's team compete as Barking Abbey in NBL Division 1, the second tier of British men's basketball.

From 2010–2012, the academy partnered with NBL Division 1 side Essex Leopards, representing as the BA London Leopards. The joint venture was triumphant in winning the Division 1 league, National Cup and playoffs titles in 2012. Following the end of this partnership, the academy entered a team in its own right in 2012, competing in Division 4. In 2014, the academy partnered with the Medway Park Crusaders, competing as the Kent Crusaders in Division 1.

=== Season-by-season records ===
Season	Division	Tier	Regular Season						Post-Season	National Cup
Season	Division	Tier	Finish	Played	Wins	Losses	Points	Win %	Post-Season	National Cup
Barking Abbey
2009–10	D4 SE	5	1st	12	10	2	20	0.833	Semi-finals	Did not compete
2012–13	D4 SE	5	1st	18	15	3	30	0.833	Semi-finals	Did not compete
2013–14	D3 Sou	4	8th	20	6	14	12	0.300	Did not qualify	2nd round
Kent Crusaders
2014–15	D1	2	4th	24	16	8	32	0.667	Winners	3rd round
2015–16	D1	2	14th	26	3	23	6	0.115	Did not qualify	3rd round
2016–17	D2	3	1st	22	19	3	38	0.864	Winners	Semi-finals
2017–18	D1	2	10th	24	9	15	18	0.375	Did not qualify	4th round
Barking Abbey Crusaders
2018–19	D1	2	12th	26	8	18	16	0.308	Did not qualify	4th round
Barking Abbey
2019–20	D1	2	12th	21	4	17	12	0.190	Did not qualify	3rd round
BA London Lions
2020–21	D1	2	10th	19	7	12	14	0.368	1st round	No competition
London Lions II
2021–22	D1	2	10th	26	9	17	18	0.346	Did not qualify	Semi-finals
2022–23	D1	2	12th	26	6	20	12	0.231	Did not qualify	4th round
Barking Abbey
2023–24	D1	2	12th	24	4	20	8	0.167	Did not qualify	

== Women's team ==
The women's team compete, in partnership with the London Lions, as the London Lions in the WBBL, the top tier of British women's basketball.

== Academy teams ==
The academy was a founding member of the Elite Academies Basketball League (EABL) and Women's Elite Basketball League (WEABL).

The men's team won the inaugural Elite League in 2014, defeating Bristol-based SGS College 76–74 in the final. Abbey next won the title in 2017, and defended their title in 2018, defeating Charnwood and Myerscough.

The men's will compete in the 2019–20 Euroleague Next Generation Tournament, the highest junior basketball competition in Europe.

== See also ==
- London Lions (women)
