= Walter Moyse =

Canadian basketball player

Walter Moyse (born in 1981) is a 6-foot-11-inch (211 cm) Canadian basketball player, playing professional basketball in Europe following a successful collegiate career at Acadia University in Canada. Born in Summerside, Prince Edward Island, he is the younger brother of Canadian Gold Medal Olympian and World Rugby Hall of Fame member Heather Moyse.

== Premier Basketball League ==
Moyse was the 2nd overall draft pick by the Halifax Rainmen in the 2008 Premier Basketball League draft, held on October 16, 2008. At the time, Rainmen owner Andre Levingston commented that "Moyse is a great pick. He is very athletic for his size; he runs the floor well and finishes around the basket. Moyse is a player with length that will beat most big men down the floor.". However Moyse and the Rainmen were unable to come to terms on a contract for the 2008–2009 season.

== Switzerland ==
2007-2008 was Moyse's second season playing for Villars of the Swiss "B" league. In the 2007–2008 regular season he led Villars to a 17–5 record (2nd place) while leading the team in scoring (13.9 ppg), rebounding (7.0 rpg), and blocks in only 27.8 min/game while shooting 55.6% from the field and 72.9% from the line. In the 2006–2007 regular season, Moyse led Villars to a 5th-place finish (10–10 record) that earned the team a first-round playoff bye. He ranked 6th in league scoring (18.8 ppg), 7th in league rebounding (9.6 rpg), 9th in free throw percentage (80.4%), 9th in fouls drawn (4.5 pg) and 5th in overall rating (23.6) while shooting 58.5% from the field (117/200) in 17 games.

== England ==
During 2005–2006, Moyse played for the East Kent Crusaders in the Southeast conference of EBL Division 3. He led the team in scoring (17.5 ppg), rebounding (11.7 rpg), blocked shots, free throws and field goal percentage. Moyse was named conference player of the year as well as team MVP and Best Newcomer. He helped the Crusaders win their division and earn promotion to EBL Division 2 in only their second season of competition.

== Canada ==
Moyse had a strong five-year career playing for the Acadia Axemen under head coach Dave Nutbrown. In his final season, 2003–2004, Moyse led the Atlantic University Sport in rebounds (8.5 rpg) and double-doubles (9) and was also selected as a 2nd Team all-star. Walter also finished 4th in field goal percentage (54.2%), 5th in free throw percentage (81.1%) and 8th in scoring (13.3 ppg). His 8.5 rebounds per game ranked 6th overall in Canada. He also represented Prince Edward Island at the NIKE 2000 Junior National Championships in London, Ontario where he was named to the tournament all-star team. Moyse played in the 2007 UPEI Spring Basketball League where his Red team fell in the semi-finals to the eventual champion Gold team 96–82, with Moyse scoring 20 on June 11, 2007.
