= Mike Wells =

Mike or Michael Wells may refer to:

- Mike Wells (basketball), American basketball coach
- Mike Wells (businessman) (born 1960), American businessman, CEO of Athora, former CEO of Prudential
- Mike Wells (defensive lineman) (born 1971), American football defensive lineman
- Michael Wells (pathologist) (born 1952), British pathologist
- Mike Wells (quarterback) (born 1951), American football quarterback
- Michael Wells (rugby union) (born 1993), Australian rugby union player
- Mike Wells (tight end) (born 1962), American football tight end
