= West Yorkshire Hawks =

- League: National Basketball League (England)
- Established: 2023; 3 years ago
- Arena: University of Huddersfield
- Location: Huddersfield, West Yorkshire
- Team colours
- Website: Official website

The West Yorkshire Hawks are a basketball club based in the town of Huddersfield, West Yorkshire. The club was founded in 2023 by Mark Mills and Greg Dolan, under the banner of WY Basketball, a not-for-profit community interest company to provide more opportunities for people in the local area to enjoy basketball and improve health outcomes. The Hawks entered the National Basketball League Division 3 North for the 2023–24 season, marking the return of elite basketball to the area for the first time since the demise of Huddersfield Heat in 2014.

== Season-by-season records ==
Season	Division	Tier	Regular Season					Post-Season	National Cup	Head coach
Season	Division	Tier	Finish	Played	Wins	Losses	Win %	Post-Season	National Cup	Head coach
West Yorkshire Hawks Men
2023–24	D3 Nor	4	4th	16	10	6	0.625	Did not qualify	2nd Round	Mark Mills
2024-25	D3 Nor	4	2nd	14	11	3	0.786	Quarter Finals	4th Round	Danny Byrne
2025-26	D2A	4	2nd	20	14	5	0.700	Quarter Finals	2nd Round	Danny Byrne
West Yorkshire Hawks Women
2025-26	D2A	3	10th	20	3	17	0.150	Did not qualify	1st Round	Amelia Oates
