= Milton Keynes Breakers B.C. =

Milton Keynes Breakers
- League: BCB
- Founded: 2017; 9 years ago
- Arena: Bletchley Leisure Centre
- Location: Milton Keynes, England
- Head coach: Nigel Lloyd
- Website: Official website

The Milton Keynes Breakers are a basketball club based in the city of Milton Keynes, England. The club was founded in 2017, adding the Breakers name in 2022, after the famous Bletchley Codebreakers.

The senior men's team entered the National Basketball League in 2022, marking the return of basketball to the city of Milton Keynes for the first time since the Milton Keynes Lions, who played in the British Basketball League from 1998 to 2012, moved to London. In the 2023/24 senior men's national cup, they became the first non-division 1 team to win the competition in over 50 years.

The club competes in junior National Basketball League competitions in all age groups for boys and girls, while also offering community basketball in 6 different local basketball centres with their own intra-club basketball league.

Additionally, the club provides a sixth form basketball academy, in collaboration with the 5 Dimensions Trust, competing in the College Basketball League (CBL).

== Current roster ==
Milton Keynes Breakers 26-27 roster
Players
Coaches

Pos.	No.	Nat.	Name	Ht.
G		(United Kingdom)	Oates, Kalvin	5 ft 10 in (1.78 m)
G		(United Kingdom)	Winspear, Caleb	6 ft 2 in (1.88 m)
G		(United Kingdom)	Spencer, Jordan	6 ft 2 in (1.88 m)
G		(United Kingdom)	Issekya, William	6 ft 2 in (1.88 m)
G		(United Kingdom)	Dieterich, Jonas	6 ft 5 in (1.96 m)
G		(Australia) (United Kingdom)	Pearl, George	6 ft 6 in (1.98 m)
F		(United States)	Woodard, Nick	6 ft 7 in (2.01 m)
F		(United States)	Duffy, Darius	6 ft 9 in (2.06 m)
F		(United Kingdom)	Grant, Sam	6 ft 9 in (2.06 m)

Head coach

Nigel Lloyd

Legend

- (C) Team captain
- Injured

== Season-by-season records ==
Season	Division	Tier	Regular Season						Post-Season	National Cup	Kitking Trophy
Season	Division	Tier	Finish	Played	Wins	Losses	Points	Win %	Post-Season	National Cup	Kitking Trophy
Milton Keynes Breakers											Kitking Trophy
2022-23	D3 East	4	1st	18	18	0	36	1.000	Winners	Semi-finals	
2023-24	D2 Sou	3	1st	22	21	1	42	0.955	Winners	Winners	
2024-25	D1	2	4th	24	16	8	32	0.667	Runners-Up	Quarter-Finals	Runners-Up
