= Teesside Lions =

- League: NBL Division 2
- Established: 2007; 19 years ago
- History: Middlesbrough Lions; 2007-2013; Teesside Lions; 2013-present
- Arena: Eston Sports Centre
- Capacity: 1,200
- Location: Middlesbrough, England
- Team colours
- Website: Official website

The Teesside Lions are an English basketball club from the town of Middlesbrough in the northeast of England. The Lions compete in National Basketball League Division 2, and play their home games at Eston Sports Academy.

== History ==
Founded in 2007 as the Middlesbrough Lions, the organisation made an early impact on the national scene, entering the National League after strong performances in the National Founders Cup, an annual knockout competition for non-league clubs. The club participated in the National League from 2010 to 2013, before dropping back down into the regional league as the newly named Teesside Lions. The Lions announced plans to re-enter National League Division 3 for the 2019–20 season.

In January 2019, the club announced plans to bring professional basketball to the area.

== Season-by-season records ==
Season	Division	Tier	Regular Season						Post-Season	National Cup
Season	Division	Tier	Finish	Played	Wins	Losses	Points	Win %	Post-Season	National Cup
Teesside Lions
2019-20	D3 Nor	4	6th	19	9	10	20	0.474	Did not qualify	Did not compete
2020-21	D3 Nor	4	Season cancelled due to COVID-19 pandemic							
2021-22	D3 Nor	4	1st	15	13	2	26	0.867	Winners, beating Worcester	3rd round
2022-23	D3 Nor	4	1st	18	18	0	36	1.000	Quarter-finals	4th round
2023-24	D2 Nor	3	4th	22	13	9	26	0.591	Quarter-finals	
