= St Helens Saints B.C. =

English professional sports team

St Helens Saints
- League: NBL Division 2 North
- Established: 2020; 6 years ago
- History: St Helens Saints; 2020-present
- Arena: Volair Huyton
- Capacity: 500
- Location: St Helens, England
- Team colours
- Website: Official website

St Helens Saints are an English professional basketball club based in the town of St Helens in northwest England.

== History ==
The club was founded in 2020, following a merger of the West Lancs Warriors (2013) and St Helens (2012) basketball clubs.

The senior men's team entered the National Basketball League Division 3 North West for the 2021-22 season, achieving promotion to Division 2 North in their inaugural season with an unbeaten 20–0 league record. In 2022-23, the team moved its home venue to Volair Huyton, the former home of the Mersey Tigers of the British Basketball League. They finished 2nd in Division 2 North, with a 20-2 record, and qualified for the Division 2 Playoffs final.

== Season-by-season records ==
Season	Division	Tier	Regular Season						Post-Season	National Cup
Season	Division	Tier	Finish	Played	Wins	Losses	Points	Win %	Post-Season	National Cup
St Helens Saints
2021–22	D3 NW	4	1st	20	20	0	40	1.000	Semi-finals	Did Not Compete
2022–23	D2 Nor	3	2nd	22	20	2	40	0.909	Runners Up	3rd Round
2023–24	D2 Nor	3	2nd	22	17	5	34	0.773		
