= London BC Medelynas =

British-Lithuanian basketball club

London Stars
- League: NBL D2 South
- Established: 2012; 14 years ago
- History: London BC Medelynas (2012–2021); Baltic Stars Medelynas (2021–2023); London Stars (2023–present)
- Arena: Newham Sixth Form College
- Location: London, England
- Main sponsor: SAR Group
- Website: Official website

London Stars are a British-Lithuanian basketball club, based in London, England.

== History ==
The club was founded in 2012, initially entering the British Lithuanian Basketball League. Achieving early success in the competition, Medelynas joined the English Basketball League the following season, winning the Division 4 South East title and finishing as runners-up in the national Division 4 Playoffs.

Medelynas re-entered the NBL in 2017, achieving back-to-back promotions into the newly organised Division 2 South.

In 2019, the club merged with the Baltic Stars basketball club, an extensive junior basketball program founded in 2011. The junior teams retained the Baltic Stars name.

== Teams ==
For the 2019–20 season, Medelynas / Baltic Stars will field the following national league teams:

Senior Men: National League Division 2 South
U16 Boys: National League U16 Premier South
U14 Boys: National League U14 Premier South East

U14 Boys II: National League U14 Conference South
U14 Boys III: National League U14 Conference South

== Honours ==
Men's National League Division 3 Playoffs Champions: 2018-19
Men's National League Division 3 South League Champions: 2018-19
Men's National League Division 4 South East League Champions: 2017-18
Men's National League Division 4 South East League Champions: 2013-14
British Lithuanian Basketball League Division A Champions: 2012-13

== Home Venue ==
Medelynas play their home games at Newham Sixth Form College in the east end of London.

== Season-by-season records ==
Season	Division	Tier	Regular Season						Post-Season	National Cup
Season	Division	Tier	Finish	Played	Wins	Losses	Points	Win %	Post-Season	National Cup
London B.C. Medelynas
2013–14	D4 SE	5	1st	22	18	4	36	0.818	Runners Up	2nd round
2014–17	Withdrew from league									
2017–18	D4 SE	5	1st	18	18	0	36	1.000	Runners Up	3rd round
2018–19	D3 Sou	4	1st	16	14	2	28	0.875	Winners	1st round
2019–20	D2 Sou	3	3rd	17	11	6	23	0.647	No playoffs	3rd round
Baltic Stars Medelynas
2021–22	D2 Sou	3	7th	22	8	14	16	0.364	Did Not Qualify	
2022–23	D2 Sou	3	8th	22	11	11	22	0.500	Did Not Qualify	
London Stars
2023–24	D2 Sou	3	9th	22	8	14	16	0.364	Did Not Qualify	
