= Richmond Knights B.C. =

Richmond Knights
- League: NBL D2 South
- Established: 2009; 17 years ago
- History: Richmond Knights (2009–present)
- Location: Richmond, London
- Team colours
- Website: Official website

The Richmond Knights are an English basketball club, based in Richmond, south west London. Established in 2009, the Knights have grown rapidly to run one of the largest junior development basketball programmes in the United Kingdom, coaching over 1,500 players every week. The Knights entered the Men's National Basketball League in 2017, thereby completing the player pathway from junior to senior basketball.

== Teams ==
For the 2019–20 season, the Knights will field the following teams:

Senior Men - National Division 3 South East
U16 Boys - National U16 Premier South
U16 Girls - National U16 Premier South
U14 Boys - National U14 Premier South
U14 Girls - National U14 Premier South

U18 Men - Local League
U16 Boys II - Local League
U14 Boys II - Local League
Wheelchair

U14 Boys III - Local League
U12 Boys - Local League
U12 Boys II - Local League
U15 Girls - Local League
U13 Girls - Local League

U12 Girls - Local League
U10 Boys - Local League
U10 Boys II - Local League
U10 Boys III - Local League
U10 Girls - Local League

== Season-by-season records ==
| Season | Division | Tier | Regular Season | | | | | | Post-Season | National Cup |
| Season | Division | Tier | Finish | Played | Wins | Losses | Points | Win % | Post-Season | National Cup |
|---|---|---|---|---|---|---|---|---|---|---|
Richmond Knights
| 2017–18 | D4 SE | 5 | 3rd | 18 | 12 | 6 | 24 | 0.667 | Did not qualify | Did not compete |
| 2018–19 | D4 SE | 5 | 4th | 18 | 12 | 6 | 24 | 0.667 | Quarter-finals | 2nd round |
| 2019–20 | D3 SE | 4 | 1st | 14 | 11 | 3 | 24 | 0.786 | No playoffs | 1st round |
| 2020–21 | D2 Sou | 3 | No season due to COVID-19 pandemic | | | | | | | |
| 2021–22 | D2 Sou | 3 | 6th | 22 | 10 | 12 | 20 | 0.455 | Did not qualify | 2nd round |
| 2022–23 | D2 Sou | 3 | 5th | 22 | 13 | 9 | 26 | 0.591 | Did not qualify | 2nd round |
| 2023–24 | D2 Sou | 3 | 3rd | 22 | 16 | 6 | 32 | 0.727 | Quarter-finals | |
