= Josh Phillips =

Josh Phillips may refer to:

- Josh Phillips (actor), American actor
- Josh Phillips (footballer) (born 2005), English footballer
- Josh Phillips (murderer) (born 1984), American murderer, convicted of killing an 8-year-old girl when he was 14 years old
- Josh Phillips (musician) (born 1962), English musician
- Josh Phillips (soccer) (born 1991), American soccer player
