= London Elite B.C. =

London Elite
- League: NBL Division 1
- Established: 2019; 7 years ago
- History: London Elite; 2019-present
- Arena: Capital City Academy
- Capacity: 300
- Location: Harlesden, London, England
- Team colours
- Ownership: Daniel Szatkowski
- Website: Official website

London Elite B.C. is an English professional basketball club based in Harlesden in northwest London, England. The club was founded in 2019 by Daniel Szatkowski, a former professional basketball player and coach at London United, with the aim to create a best-in-class junior development programme and high-performing men's team.

The junior programme entered the junior NBL and European Youth Basketball League for the 2020–21 season. The team claimed the 2022-23 Under-18 Boys National Cup title with a 70–53 win over London Legends at the National Basketball Centre in Manchester.

In 2022, Elite formed a partnership with UCFB Wembley Campus, providing opportunities for players to study degrees in the sports industry at Wembley Stadium, alongside their full-time training programmes.

The senior men's team entered the National Basketball League Division 3 for the 2021–22 season, achieving promotion to Division 2 in their inaugural season with an unbeaten league record. The team secured back to back promotions, winning the 2022-23 Division 2 title.

== Season-by-season records ==
Season	Division	Tier	Regular Season						Post-Season	National Cup
Season	Division	Tier	Finish	Played	Wins	Losses	Points	Win %	Post-Season	National Cup
London Elite
2021–22	D3 Sou	4	1st	9	9	0	18	1.000	Quarter-finals	4th Round
2022–23	D2 Sou	3	1st	22	17	5	34	0.773	Semi-finals	4th Round
2023–24	D1	2	13th	24	3	21	6	0.125	Did Not Qualify	
