= Canterbury Academy =

The Canterbury Academy

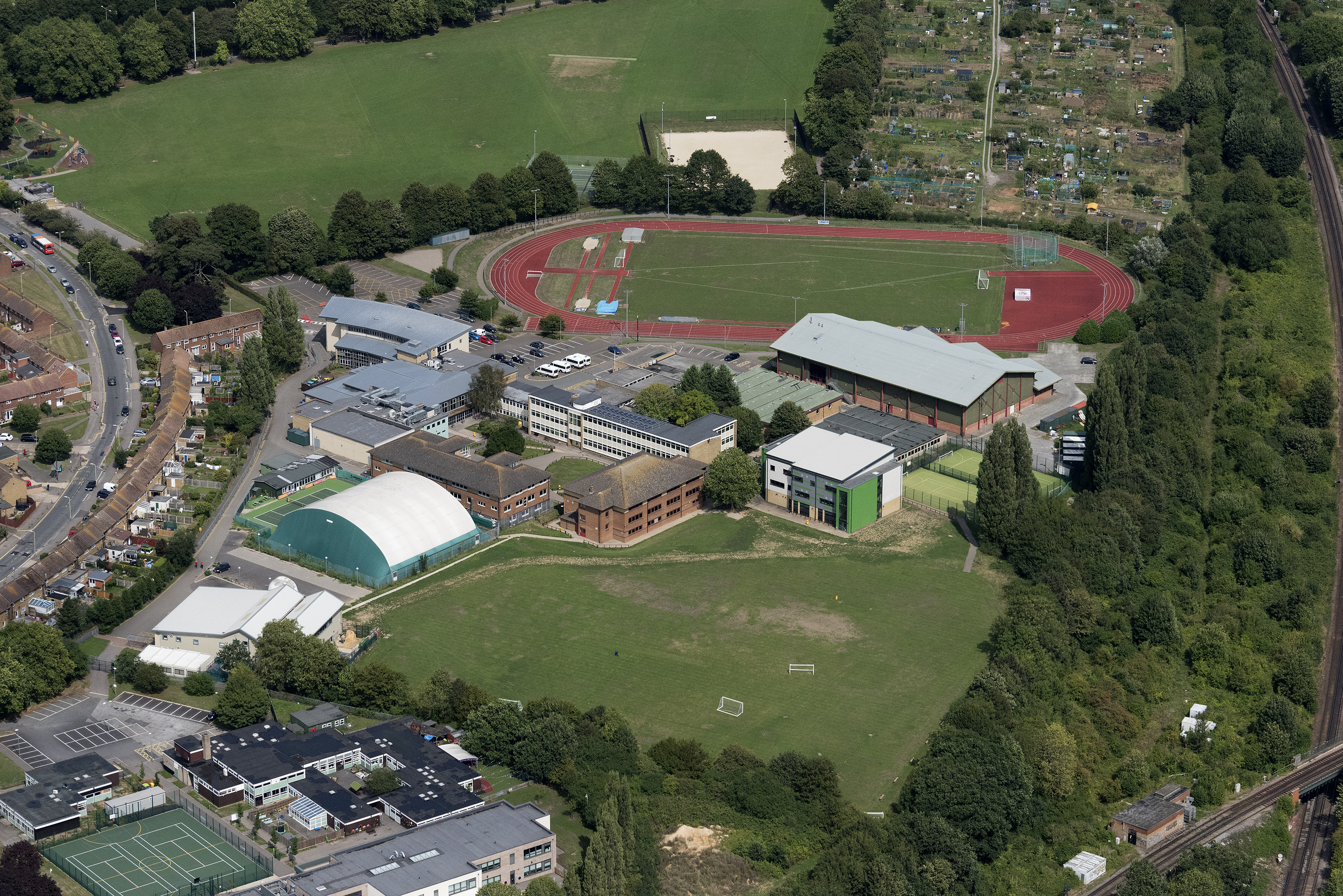

Location
- Knight Avenue; Canterbury, Kent, CT2 8QA; England; 51.27856°N 1.06316°E

Information
- Type: Academy
- Established: 7 October 2005
- Local authority: Kent
- Specialist: Sports
- Department for Education URN: 136302 Tables
- Ofsted: Reports
- Gender: Coeducational
- Age: 11 to 19
- Enrolment: 1833
- Capacity: 1300
- Website: www.canterbury.kent.sch.uk

The Canterbury Academy is a co-educational 11-19 academy school in Canterbury, Kent, England. It is a specialist Sports College and 15% of its 1081 pupils are selected on musical aptitude. The school was founded as a non-selective secondary modern foundation school before gaining academy status in 2010.

== Location ==
The school is on the London Road estate in the west of the city. The high school and primary school are collectively known as The Canterbury Campus.

The Canterbury Adult Education Centre is now on the same site.

== Academic selection ==
Kent is the largest county in England to operate academic selection at the age of eleven. Children in Kent sit the Kent test (eleven plus) to determine whether they are suitable for an academic education, or for a modern education. In a country that abandoned selection in 1967, this is an anachronism. No new grammar schools may be built, though existing grammar schools may expand or open annexes. In Canterbury there are few mixed grammar school places though an undoubted need.

The Canterbury Academy is legally deemed to be a non-selective school but has a close working partnership with the grammar school, Simon Langton Boys. Together they run a mixed grammar school band within the Canterbury Academy Comprehensive School.

== Academics ==
=== Middle school (years 7- 9) ===
The school is obliged to teach to the National Curriculum (England) as are all state funded schools. They follow a 3-year Key Stage 3, which prescribes a broad based course of study, weighted to Maths, English and Science with a humanity and a modern foreign language. These are the subjects chosen as the English Baccalaureate. The school quotes Section 89(1)(d) of the Education and Inspections Act 2006 which gives schools the legal right to ensure that pupils complete any tasks 'reasonably assigned to them', to set two types of obligatory homework. EH (examination homework) task will be marked and given a GCSE type grade, while Love of Learning homework allow the students to develop other areas of interest. Throughout Key Stage 3 students are, to use the schools terminology offered 'Pillar Lessons', a series of stand alone lessons in separate disciplines- such as Hair, Forensic Science, Photography, Musical theatre. These taster lessons lead into exam options offered at Key Stage 4.

=== Senior School (years 10-11) ===
Students are encouraged but not forced to study the English Baccalaureate. All students work towards at least 8 GCSEs, or equivalents. They follow a core curriculum of English Language, English Literature, maths, statistics, science, history or geography with core PE and learning skills. In addition, options include RE, languages, computing, dance, drama, music, art, design technology, resistant materials food, sport, business and enterprise, social sciences, childcare, health and socialcare, hair and beauty, photography, and construction. This is achieved by having extended lessons after the Middle School day has finished.

=== Sixth Form (years 12-13) ===
==== The Four Pillars ====
The school sees itself as built on Four Pillars of Excellence, that reflect the specialisms it has built up in the past. They are

- Academic- bolstered with it partnership with Simon Langton Boys
- Practical- which includes the manual skills, NVQs City and Guilds but alslthe Business and Enterprise skills that come through BTEC and bolstered by the Peter Jones Business Academy
- Elite Sporting facilities with partners in Rugby, Hockey, Cricket, Golf, Triathlon sharing training facilities
- Performance Arts with programs in Acting, Dance, Music, Musical theatre and Production skills.

While involved in one of these programs, sixth former are given student leadership rôles in middle school and the primary school.

== Ofsted judgement ==
Ofsted rated this as a good school. Saying :" That board members, leaders and staff passionately oversee a unique, large, vibrant and increasingly popular school, with a quite exceptional curriculum delivered in outstanding facilities. They never sway from doing what they believe is right for a pupil, regardless of any reduction to their headline measures"
