= Cheshire Wire =

Basketball team in Cheshire, England

- League: NBL D3 North
- Established: 2013; 13 years ago
- History: Cheshire Wire (2013–present)
- Arena: Birchwood Complex
- Capacity: 400
- Location: Warrington, Cheshire
- Website: Official website

The Cheshire Wire are an English basketball club, based in the town of Warrington in the northwest of England.

== History ==
Following the demise of the Cheshire Jets BBL franchise in second half of 2012, junior basketball in the area was experiencing an extended period of uncertainty.

The continuation of junior national league basketball in the county was guaranteed when the Cheshire Wire Basketball Club was formally founded by Mike Halpin in the spring of 2013 .

Initially providing junior basketball for the area, the club went from strength-to-strength, winning national titles and regularly competing with the powerhouses of English junior basketball.

Building on the success of the junior teams and to provide a pathway into senior basketball, the club entered into the Men's English Basketball League for the first time in 2018. The club's focus, however, remained to develop an elite-level junior program.

The club's nickname is derived from the wire-making industry that the town of Warrington was once famous for.

== Honours ==
U18 Men's North Premier Champions and National Runners-Up 2014-15
U16 Men's North Premier Champions and National Cup Champions 2015-16
U16 Men's National Runners-Up 2016-17

== Home Venue ==
Birchwood Leisure Complex

== Season-by-season records ==
Season	Division	Tier	Regular Season						Post-Season	National Cup
Season	Division	Tier	Finish	Played	Wins	Losses	Points	Win %	Post-Season	National Cup
Cheshire Wire
2018–19	D4 Nor	5	9th	16	1	15	2	0.063	Did not qualify	Did not compete
2019–20	D3 Nor	4	12th	20	0	20	2	0.000	Did not qualify	Did not compete
2021–22	D3 NW	4	10th	20	4	16	8	0.200	Did not qualify	Did not compete
2022–23	D3 NW	4	11th	20	2	18	4	0.100	Did not qualify	Did not compete
2023–24	D3 NW	4	2nd	20	16	4	32	0.800		
