= Northamptonshire Titans B.C. =

English basketball club

Northamptonshire Titans
- League: NBL D2 South
- Established: 2012; 14 years ago
- History: Northamptonshire Titans; 2012-present
- Location: Wellingborough, Northants
- Website: Official website

Northamptonshire Titans B.C. is an English basketball club, based in the town of Wellingborough, Northamptonshire.

== History ==
The club was formed in 2012 following the merger of two local clubs, Wellingborough Phoenix, formed in 1988, and Northampton, a succession of teams who competed in the National Leagues between 1993 and 2009. The Titans entered the National Basketball League in 2019, achieving promotion to Division 2 (South) in their inaugural season with a 100% record.

== Teams ==
For the 2020–21 season, the Titans will field the following teams:

Senior Men - National Division 2 South
Senior Men II - National Division 3 Midlands
Senior Women - National Division 2 South
U18 Men - National U18 Premier

U18 Men II - National U18 Conference
U18 Women - National U18 Conference
U16 Boys - National U16 Premier
U16 Boys II - National U16 Conference

U16 Girls - National U16 Conference
U14 Boys - National U14 Premier
U14 Boys II - National U14 Conference
U14 Girls - National U14 Conference

U12 Boys - National U12 Conference
U12 Girls - National U12 Conference
U19 Academy - Academies Basketball League

== Foundation ==
The club also run several community initiatives, including mini basketball and walking basketball.

== Notable former players ==
- (United Kingdom) Jacob Round
- (United Kingdom) Samuel Grant

== Season-by-season records ==
| Season | Division | Tier | Regular Season | | | | | | Post-Season | National Cup |
| Season | Division | Tier | Finish | Played | Wins | Losses | Points | Win % | Post-Season | National Cup |
|---|---|---|---|---|---|---|---|---|---|---|
Northamptonshire Titans
| 2019–20 | D3 East | 4 | 1st | 13 | 13 | 0 | 27 | 1.000 | No playoffs | 2nd round |
| 2021–22 | D2 Nor | 3 | 2nd | 22 | 15 | 7 | 30 | 0.682 | Quarter-finals | 4th round |
| 2022–23 | D2 Nor | 3 | 9th | 22 | 7 | 15 | 14 | 0.318 | Did not qualify | 4th round |
