= Tees Valley Mohawks =

English basketball club

- League: NBL Division 3
- Established: 1997; 29 years ago
- History: Teesside Mohawks; 1997-2006; Tees Valley Mohawks; 2007-present
- Arena: Middlesbrough College
- Location: Middlesbrough, England
- Main sponsor: Scott Brothers
Home	Away

The Tees Valley Mohawks are an English basketball club in Middlesbrough, North Yorkshire, which plays in the National Basketball League Division 3, the fourth tier of British basketball. Their home venue is Middlesbrough College.

== History ==
The Mohawks are arguably the most successful basketball club from the area, having won numerous national trophies. Their most successful period was in the early 2000s, in that time winning the 1999-00, 2001–02 and 2002–03 Division 1 league titles, 2002–03 and 2003-04 Division 1 Playoff titles and winning the National Trophy four consecutive times from 1999 to 2003. Their most recent success was the 2008 Patrons Cup.

Success dried up, and following relegation from Division 1 and after a season in Division 2, the club took a short hiatus, focusing on developing their youth system. The club re-entered the National Basketball League in 2019, playing in the reorganised Division 3.

The Mohawks won the 2022 Otto Estensen Trophy.

== Notable former players ==
- (United Kingdom) Caylin Raftopolous
- (United Kingdom) David Hanson
- (United States) Tony Hanson
- (United Kingdom) Kieron Achara
- (United States) E. J. Harrison
- (United Kingdom) Jason Swaine
- (United States) Ralph Bucci
- (United Kingdom) Taner Adu
- (United Kingdom) Michael Gayle
- (United Kingdom) Neil Fingleton
- (United States) Charles Smith
- (United Kingdom) Sasha Riley
- (Republic of Ireland) Eoin O'Brien
- (United Kingdom) Jon Stonebridge

== Season-by-season records ==
Season	Division	Tier	Regular Season						Post-Season	National Cup
Season	Division	Tier	Finish	Played	Wins	Losses	Points	Win %	Post-Season	National Cup
Teesside Mohawks
1997-98	D1	2	4th	22	14	8	28	0.636		
1998-99	D1	2	4th	26	19	7	38	0.731		Last 16
1999-00	D1	2	1st	24	22	2	44	0.917		
2000-01	D1	2	3rd	21	15	6	30	0.714		Last 16
2001-02	D1	2	1st	18	17	1	34	0.944		Last 16
2002-03	D1	2	1st	22	21	1	42	0.955	Winners	Quarter-finals
2003-04	D1	2	3rd	22	16	6	32	0.727	Winners	Runners-up
2004-05	D1	2	7th	22	10	12	20	0.455		
2005-06	D1	2	10th	26	8	18	16	0.308	Did not qualify	
2006-07	D1	2	11th	22	5	17	10	0.227	Did not qualify	
Tees Valley Mohawks
2007-08	D2	3	1st	22	18	4	36	0.818		
2008-09	D1	2	7th	18	8	10	16	0.444		2nd round
2009-10	D1	2	11th	22	4	18	8	0.182	Did not qualify	3rd round
2010-11	D2	3	2nd	20	16	4	32	0.800	Semi-finals	2nd round
2011-12	D1	2	11th	24	4	20	8	0.167	Did not qualify	Semi-finals
2012-13	D1	2	4th	26	16	10	32	0.615	Quarter-finals	3rd round
2013-14	D1	2	9th	26	12	14	24	0.462	Did not qualify	3rd round
2014-15	D1	2	11th	24	9	15	18	0.375	Did not qualify	3rd round
2015-16	D1	2	13th	26	4	22	8	0.154	Did not qualify	2nd round
2016-17	D2	3	7th	22	9	13	18	0.409	Quarter-finals	3rd round
2017-19	Withdrew from league									
Tees Valley Mohawks
2019-20	D3 Nor	4	3rd	21	15	6	31	0.714	No playoffs	Did not compete
2020-21	D3 Nor	4	Season cancelled due to COVID-19 pandemic							
2021-22	D3 Nor	4	2nd	15	12	3	24	0.800	Quarter-fínals	Did not compete
2022-23	D3 Nor	4	2nd	18	14	4	28	0.778	1st round	Did not compete

Note: Until 2003, the National Cup was competed for by the professional clubs of the British Basketball League as well as National League clubs. Since 2003-04, the competition has been competed for only by National League clubs, after the creation of the BBL Cup.
