= Kent Crusaders (basketball) =

- League: NBL Division 3 SE
- Founded: 2000; 26 years ago
- History: Canterbury Jazz, CK Heat (Early 1990s–2001); East Kent Crusaders (2001–2006); Kent Crusaders (2006–2009); Medway Park Crusaders (2009–2014); Kent Crusaders (2014–present)
- Location: Gillingham, Kent

The Kent Crusaders are an English basketball club based in the town of Gillingham, Kent.

The team's history dates back to the early 1990s, but in its current form it has been in existence since 2000. The club has sent three players to professional contracts in Europe, including Ryan Richards, the youngest player ever to play in the Nike Hoop Summit.

The club runs an elite 6th form academy based at Canterbury High School, launched in 2007, and stronger links being formed with the juniors in 2008 as the club expanded to include men's, under-18, under-16 and under-14 National League teams.

== Club history ==
=== Origins ===
The roots of the Kent Crusaders began in the early 1990s when Kevin and Christine Paice, Dave Hooper and Hilli Lingham began developing junior basketball at Canterbury College. Through their work, the Canterbury Jazz and CK Heat were born. As the club gathered momentum, the college became the place to be for basketball in East Kent. Trevor Acres and Kevin Maloney joined the coaching staff and numerous boys were given the opportunity to play National League and the club won numerous Kent cups. In 2000, ex-player and young coach Jay Gifford took over the club. He was joined a year later by Canadian Jesse Sazant. Coach Sazant took the team to new heights, including a National Under 16 quarterfinal in his first season. At this point the club was relaunched as the East Kent Crusaders.

=== National League ===
After losing older players to the London clubs for years, the club decided to launch a men's EBL Division 3 team in 2004. In their first season the club finished third in Division 3 South East. The initial season saw a number of the club's former junior players return to the Crusaders to be joined by a number of local players. In their second season the team quickly progressed, winning the 2005/06 EBL Division 3 South East and making the finals of the National Shield. The club also signed their first foreign player, 6'10 Canadian Walter Moyse and foreign coach assistant, Dane Mads Olesen. The 2005/06 team was led by Walter Moyse, Paul Jessop and Robbie Parker, and featured 14-year old Ryan Richards, a 2007 Nike Hoop Summit World Team Player and a 2008 Euroleague Final Four: Nike International Junior Tournament player with Real Madrid. The Crusaders got promoted to EBL Division 2 and were renamed the Kent Crusaders in summer 2006. While the club signed a number of new players it also lost Moyse, Parker and Richards to contracts in Europe. Initially the remaining players and new signings London Towers players Sam Betts and James Acres, Reading Rockets guard Damion Lyons, former Crusaders junior Angelo Irving and East London's Gary Davison and JP Dontoni, fared well, winning the first three league games, before fading down the stretch and only being assured another season in Division 2 in the last round of games. On 2 April 2007, Jesse Sazant stepped down as head coach to concentrate on a role as chairman and director of basketball, passing the coaching reins to Mads Olesen. The 2007 offseason season saw the Crusaders lose team leaders captain Paul Jessop, leading scorer and starting point guard Gary Davidson, big man Angelo Irving, guard James Parker, forward JP Dontoni, and forward James Acres, but in his new role as Director of Basketball Jesse Sazant managed to recruit young talented players to make up for the losses. Two young Barking Abbey Basketball Academy players, 6'0 18-year-old guard Rikki Broadmore (Under 18's Reading Rockets National League and Cup champion) and 6'6 forward, 18-year-old former England Under 16's player Dan Garrad. Additionally 20-year-old JP Dimandja, a 6’6 forward with untapped potential and athleticism joined from Eastside Eagles. The team struggled early in the season as the young players adjusted to the physicality of men's basketball while the returning players adjusted to their new roles as team leaders, crashing out of the Patrons Cup and losing twelve of the first sixteen league games. The team was able to secure another season in Division 3 with three games to go with a key away win at Team Northumbria. The 2007/08 season also saw the start of the Kent Crusaders and Canterbury High School Basketball Sixth Form Academy. The academy accepted 12 players in its first year and was coached by Damian Lyons and Sam Bets. The academy focuses on developing player fundamentals and academy player Adam Brown managed to play in two games for the Crusaders men's team.

=== Current club ===
The 2008 off season saw the Crusaders management focus stability on the men's team as they secured that the key players from the previous season stayed on. Also in the summer of 2008 the Kent Crusaders men's Club and the East Kent Crusaders Junior Basketball Club merged into one club and added Under 18's, 16's and 14's EBL National League teams to the club. The Kent Crusaders Basketball Academy are based at Canterbury High School.

Student athletes at the academies receive daily coaching in addition to dedicated time for strength and conditioning work. Alongside this the 6th form students study a BTEC in Sports Performance and Excellence (which is equivalent to two A-levels) as well as 2 other courses of their choice. The school competes in the Elite Academies Basketball League. Additionally, players are expected to play at the highest club level they can. Current academy members play for the Crusaders national league team, under 18 team and a number of local men's teams.

=== Partnership with Barking Abbey ===
In 2014, the Crusaders' men's team formed a partnership with the elite academy at Barking Abbey School. During this period, the best young players from the Barking Abbey team would form the nucleus of the Crusaders in National League competitions, first as the Kent Crusaders, and then as the Barking Abbey Crusaders. Their combined efforts were successful; winning the D1 Playoffs in 2015 and D2 Playoffs in 2017. Such was the high turnover of players brought by being based around age-group players, the Crusaders were relegated to Division 2 in 2016. The partnership ended in 2019, with Barking retaining the Crusaders place in Division 1 and competing solely as Barking Abbey, and the Crusaders focusing on a Division 3 National League team based around the elite Canterbury Academy programme.

== Head coaches ==
- 2000–2001 (England) Jay Gifford
- 2001–2007 (Canada) Jesse Sazant
- 2007–2011 (Denmark) Mads Olesen
- 2014–2019 (England) Lloyd Gardner
- 2018–2025 (England) Adam Davies
- 2025–Present (Australia) Reece Kaye
