= Surrey Scorchers =

British professional basketball team

- League: BBL
- Established: 2005; 21 years ago
- Folded: 2024
- History: Guildford Heat (2005–2012); Surrey Heat (2012–2013); Surrey United (2013–2015); Surrey Scorchers (2015–2024)
- Arena: Surrey Sports Park
- Capacity: 970
- Location: Guildford, Surrey
- Team colours: Black, Duck Egg Blue, White
- Ownership: Surrey Sports Park
- Championships: 1 BBL Championship; 1 BBL Playoffs; 1 BBL Cup; 1 BBL Trophy
- Website: www.surreyscorchers.co.uk
Home	Away

The Surrey Scorchers were an English professional basketball team based in Guildford, Surrey, that competed in the British Basketball League.

The team was established in 2005 as the Guildford Heat by fans of former British Basketball League team Thames Valley Tigers, who folded during the same year. Making an appearance in the ULEB Cup in 2007, the franchise was rebranded as the Surrey Heat in 2012. After the sale of the franchise by former owner Alison Reeve, the Heat were rebranded once again in September 2013 to become Surrey United. The franchise became wholly owned by Surrey Sports Park in June 2015, and was rebranded as the Surrey Scorchers. They originally played their home games at the Guildford Spectrum, before moving to the Surrey Sports Park in 2010.

== Franchise history ==
=== Basketball in Guildford ===
The town of Guildford has been home to several elite basketball teams down the years. With the opening of the Guildford Spectrum, the successful Kingston team uprooted, moved in and renamed themselves as the Guildford Kings in 1992, briefly calling the place home until they folded in 1994, as did the Guildford Pumas before they relocated to Sutton in 1999. However it was the first major team, the Guildford Pirates who played in the town from 1975 to 1982 that would come back to figure prominently in the birth of the new club, the Guildford Heat.

In 1982, the Pirates moved to nearby Bracknell, becoming the Bracknell Pirates and later the Thames Valley Tigers. For many years, the Tigers were one of the front runners of the British basketball scene, winning the league Championship in 1994, but it was in the new millennium that the successes dried up and for owner John Nike, the team was too much of a financial burden. In April 2005, he announced that he would no longer be funding the basketball franchise nor his ice hockey franchise Bracknell Bees.

Immediately a consortium of Tigers fans was formed to save the club. Headed by local businessman Mike Davies, they put together a viable package to take over the administration and running of the team. However, Nike failed to reach agreement in time for them to lease the franchise, and the deadline for entry into the British Basketball League for the 2005–06 season was reached. The Tigers' BBL membership thus lapsed, but the fans obtained permission from the League to enter a new team in its place, and successful negotiations with The Spectrum in Guildford led to the birth of the Guildford Heat franchise.

=== Phoenix from the flames ===
The Heat played their first ever league game on 1 October 2005 against the Newcastle Eagles at the Metro Radio Arena, losing in overtime 89–88. The very next night they defeated the Leicester Riders in the BBL Cup 69–65 at home. Heat's rookie season saw victories over established teams such as London Towers, Plymouth Raiders, Brighton Bears, and reigning Champions, Chester Jets, amongst others, making the Heat a success and a true phoenix from the flames of the Tigers franchise.

They ended the season with an impressive record of 20–20, finishing 5th in the league and qualifying for the post-season Play-offs, a remarkable achievement for the new team. In the first round of the Play-offs, playing away from home, Heat demolished the London Towers 99–81. However the opposition in the semi-finals, the all-conquering Newcastle Eagles proved too much and Heat succumbed to a 115–97 defeat. They also made the semi-final of the BBL Trophy, but missed out on a final following a nail-biting home defeat at the hands of eventual Runner-up, Leicester.

=== 2006–07 season ===
The arrival of American swingman Daniel Gilbert from Germany was a major coup for the Heat during the summer of 2006, proving playcaller Paul James still has great ability in spotting stars of the future. Guildford kick-started the season with a close away victory against the Scottish Rocks, 95–91, starting a three-game winning streak in the Championship. Heat also qualified for their first-ever cup final appearance after defeating the Sheffield Sharks 87–81 in the semi-final of the BBL Cup.

On 12 December 2006 the club announced their first major sponsorship agreement with French chimney manufacturers Poujoulat, in what was reported as potentially a six-figure deal. As a result of the contract, which was agreed to run through to May 2008, the team was renamed as Poujoulat Heat Guildford to incorporate the sponsor's name.

Just 18 months since the franchise's foundation, the Guildford Heat picked up their first piece of silverware on 7 January 2007, with an 81–78 win in the BBL Cup final against the Scottish Rocks. Over 600 Guildford fans travelled up to the National Indoor Arena, in Birmingham to see their team clinch the trophy in front of a bumper crowd of 3,785 people.

Despite seemingly looking to run away with the League title, the Heat's season suffered a huge blow when a knee injury to Chad McKnight against the Sheffield Sharks on 3 February, effectively ruled the American out for the remainder of the campaign. The player was subsequently released, assumingly for the long-term injury. However a month later, The Independent broke the news that McKnight had been issued with a three-month suspension for testing positive for marijuana, along with former Leicester star Steve Bucknall, who had also been released by his club. A statement from the club confirmed McKnight was released because of the failed drugs test, though the player denied ever using the banned substance.

The Heat secured the 2006–07 League title thanks to a highly impressive 114–85 victory over London United at the Spectrum on 8 April. It was the first League title in the franchise's history at just the second time of asking. The following week the Heat once again played host to London United in the BBL Play-off Quarter-final, with a place at the Finals Weekend up for grabs. The Heat managed to win the match 71–68 but in the semi-final, they were defeated 71–78 by the Scottish Rocks, despite being the top seed. For the incredible rise to success, Coach Paul James was awarded by his peers as the Coach of the Season for 2006–07.

Following the end of Guildford's successful double winning season, they also became the first ever BBL team to achieve Sport England Clubmark Level 4 accreditation of quality. Clubmark is a scheme designed to encourage clubs to reach various levels of national standards in the community development work they deliver. Heat are only the 9th team in the country to have achieved this accreditation, and this in addition to being recently named by England Basketball as the country's 10th biggest academy.

=== 2007–08 season ===
Following on from the successes of the previous season, the Heat were admitted into the ULEB Cup for the 2007–2008 season, as Britain's sole representatives in European competition, and the first British team to compete in Europe since the Brighton Bears' appearance in the 2003–04 season. The Heat were drawn against DKV Joventut of the Spanish ACB; Germans Alba Berlin; Türk Telekom from Ankara, Turkey; BC Šiauliai of Lithuania and, KK Bosna of Sarajevo in Bosnia-Herzegovina.

Guildford Heat won the inaugural pre-season BBL Cup Winners' Cup with a 176–168 aggregate win over two legs against the Plymouth Raiders. The competitive season started with a 90–83 victory away to the previous season's play-off winners, the Newcastle Eagles on 21 September. The two sides had collected nine of the last ten pieces of BBL silverware between them, so it was just the start the Guildford Heat needed in their bid to retain the League title.

On 6 November the Heat embarked on their biggest adventure yet, when they played in their first ever European game in the ULEB Cup, away to KK Bosna in Sarajevo just two years after the Heat had been established. Despite the huge anticipation, the Heat lost to the greater experience of KK Bosna, going down 68–84, with big summer signing Carlton Aaron scoring Heat's first ever points in Europe. This was also to be the last game team captain and point guard Brian Dux would play before a horrific car accident in the early hours of 10 November, which left him in a coma. It took Surrey Police two hours and 20 minutes to attend to the scene of the incident. Frimley Park Hospital consultants took into consideration the possibility that Dux may have suffered permanent disability. Several weeks later Dux regained consciousness and returned home to the US with his family. Meanwhile, on court, the Heat had their first home game in the ULEB Cup against Spanish giants, DKV Joventut. To comply with ULEB's regulations, the team had to switch from playing at their usual venue to that of the Guildford Flames and their ice hockey rink (also housed at the Spectrum), which provided the minimum 2,400 capacity venue required. Despite a brave performance, the Heat went down 61–95. Although performances were to improve as the competition went on, the Heat missed the experienced leadership of Brian Dux and finished their ULEB Cup campaign with an 0–10 record.

Domestically, the team maintained a strong assault in the league, hovering near the top of the table for much of the winter period, although they failed in their defence of the BBL Cup at the hands of the Milton Keynes Lions, going down 80–91 in the semi-final. Coach Paul James let go disappointing centre, Carlton Aaron, and brought in the experienced point-guard E.J. Harrison for Brian Dux, replacing Aaron with Ajou Deng, brother of the Chicago Bulls and Team GB star, Luol Deng.

On 2 March 2008, the Guildford Heat fought back from a half-time deficit to win the BBL Trophy for the first time in its history, defeating the Newcastle Eagles 86–79 at the Plymouth Pavilions. The Heat's EJ Harrison picked up the MVP award after scoring 25 points. However, in a crucial crunch game with title challengers, the Newcastle Eagles, the League Title was lost after a thrilling over-time victory for the Eagles. Despite the Heat being 18 points ahead going into the 4th quarter, the game finished 108–101 to the Eagles and Fab Flournoy's team were crowned champions.

After sweeping aside rookie franchise Everton Tigers 81–72 in the Play-off Quarter-finals, the Heat then secured their place in the final with an emphatic 81–66 win over the Plymouth Raiders at the Finals Weekend, on 3 May. The Play-off Final, held on the following day, saw Guildford up against the season's surprise package, the Milton Keynes Lions, who had just disposed of the Newcastle Eagles in the semi-final. However it was experience that prevailed and the Heat claimed another trophy with a 100–88 victory, Danny Gilbert posting 27 points and taking the Finals MVP award.

Following on from the season's achievements, the franchise was again invited into the ULEB Cup for the upcoming season, but the club opted not to be included.

=== 2008–09 season ===
The Heat started off the 2008–2009 pre-season with the announcement of signing former Heat favourite Kabir Abu, as well as American Keonta Howell and Croatian star Hrvoje Pervan. However it was revealed weeks later that Pervan's transfer had broken down due to administrative errors. Among those returning from the previous season were Heat Captain, Mike Martin, point-guard, EJ Harrison, and shooting guard, Dean Williams, while Heat fan-favourite Chad McKnight also rejoined the Heat after a one-year stint at the Leicester Riders. The line-up was completed with the signing of British big man Alan Metcalfe and shooting guard Daniel Sandell.

The new campaign began with the Heat retaining the Cup Winners Cup. They defeated the previous season's BBL Cup winners, the Milton Keynes Lions, over two legs, winning both games 91–89 at the Spectrum and 68–60 at the Bletchley Centre. The first league game saw the Heat suffer defeat on the road against the Newcastle Eagles, losing a tight affair 81–86. A run of mixed results found the team languishing in mid-table by November, while the team went out of the BBL Cup, beaten over two legs by the Plymouth Raiders in the semi-finals. The Heat lost both games, going down 73–80 in the first leg at home and 69–74 on the road.

The new year started brightly, and thanks to two victories in two days over London Capital (104–80) and the Milton Keynes Lions (101–99), the Heat booked their place in the semi-final of the Trophy. However, all wasn't well behind closed doors, and following the exit of previous Chairman and main sponsor Robert Banks, the club announced on 12 February 2009 that it had gone into administration but with a buyout imminent. The franchise's assets were purchased by local businessman Alan McClafferty, a Heat fan and volunteer coach in the club's youth setup.

Back on the court, the Heat renewed their rivalry with the Plymouth Raiders in the Trophy Semi-final. The Heat triumphed in the two-leg match-up, winning both games for a comfortable 187–161 aggregate victory. This sent the Heat to the Trophy Final, which was played at Heat's home court, the Spectrum, on 15 March, where they met the Newcastle Eagles. Despite a 30-point haul from Keonta Howell, the Heat went down 71–83, suffering under a 44–29 second-half onslaught from the Eagles.

Just days after securing a place in the Play-offs, with a 74–65 win at home against the Milton Keynes Lions, club Managing Director Alan McClafferty announced that coach Paul James would not have his contract renewed at the end of the season. The Heat finished the regular season in 4th place with a 21–12 record, qualifying for the Play-off Quarter-final with home court advantage. Drawn against the Plymouth Raiders, which marked the eighth time the two teams had met that season, the Heat suffered a disappointing end to the season, going down 81–89. A lone high-note was that American Keonta Howell was voted into the BBL All-Star first team after coming 3rd in the voting for the MVP award.

=== 2009–10 season ===
After Paul James’ departure as coach of the first team, the club quickly appointed Chad McKnight as player/coach on 8 July and subsequently brought back Mike Davies as General Manager. The fans were also pleased when the Heat announced that Captain Mike Martin was back and had signed a three-year contract to play for the Heat. However, other players decided to seek their fortunes elsewhere. Heat stalwart Dean Williams went to the Essex Pirates, where he was joined by Alan Metcafle, while point-guard EJ Harrison joined the Milton Keynes Lions. With back-up point-guard and long-time Heat player, Jon May, joining the EBL outfit Reading Rockets, Chad McKnight had a rebuilding job on his hands.

The club brought in several new faces, including BBL veteran Julius Joseph and up-and-coming young England star, Tayo Ogedengbe. McKnight also brought in two Americans in explosive point-guard Aaron Drakeford and swing man Kenny Langhorne (who replaced Keonta Howell who decided not to return to the Heat after two years there). Key man off the bench the season before, Daniel Sandell, also rejoined the club.

The new-look team opened their season with an easy 95–65 victory away to London Capital, and compiled a six-game unbeaten run at home with wins against such teams as the Everton Tigers, Newcastle Eagles and Milton Keynes Lions. However, the team's form on the road left something to be desired and after the opening win against London Capital, the Heat lost their next five games away from Guildford. Things got worse in December, when the Heat lost their 100% home record, losing 83–97 to the table-topping Sheffield Sharks. This was the start of a six-game losing streak, halted by a New Year's Day win against the Essex Pirates and finally a triumph on the road, a 74–72 win against the Leicester Riders in the BBL Trophy.

By now the team was struggling with injury. Daniel Sandell had been sidelined for most of the season with a knee injury. The victory against the Riders marked his comeback and was a personal triumph as he came off the bench to turn the game around with some deadly three-point shooting. However, other team members, including Aaron Drakeford and Kenny Langhorne, were carrying injuries and being asked to play big minutes due to a short bench. Worse still, Heat Captain Mike Martin injured his knee and was eventually forced to shut down for the season, making just three appearances after January. In his absence, Julius Joseph stepped up his game and carried the team on several occasions, going on to be the team's top scorer for the season with 17.6 points per game. Player-coach Chad McKnight also stepped up his game, hitting 30 points or more in three consecutive games, including a career-high 39 points.

The Heat won against London Capital on 10 January, meaning that they had got 2010 off to a good start with a three-game winning streak. However, they won just twice more in 18 games as they plummeted down the table to finish a lowly 11th, the first time in club history that they had failed to qualify for the play-offs.

On 14 December it had been officially announced that the 2009–10 season would be Heat's last at the Spectrum, with the franchise moving to the brand-new Surrey Sports Park for the 2010–11 season. On court it was all change too as the club announced that Chad McKnight would not return as player-coach, Creon Raftopoulous stepping in as head coach for the new 2010–11 season.

=== Dissolvement and 89ers era ===
On 14 June 2024 British Basketball, the national governing body for basketball in the UK, terminated the British Basketball League (BBL)'s licence, meaning that the UK men's professional league would no longer be run by the current operating company behind the BBL. The decision created uncertainty for the Scorchers, which eventually led to an announcement on 31 July 2024, in which the Scorchers organisation announced it would dissolve. Economic headwinds in the UK's higher education system, as well as no stability of a league, commercial structure and income streams, led to the final decision.

In August 2024, former national team player and Scorchers general manager Dan Clark announced he launched another Guildford-based franchise, the Surrey 89ers. The 89ers will have the same staff, players and front office members, while only changing the ownership structure, effectively making it a phoenix club. The team is named the "Niners", referring to 1889, the year in which the modern county of Surrey was established.

== Home arenas ==
- Guildford Spectrum (2005–2010)
- Surrey Sports Park (2010–2024)

== Season-by-season records ==
Seasons 2005–2015
Season	Division	Tier	Regular Season						Post-Season	Trophy	Cup	Head coach
Season	Division	Tier	Finish	Played	Wins	Losses	Points	Win %	Post-Season	Trophy	Cup	Head coach
Guildford Heat
2005–06	BBL	I	5th	40	20	20	40	0.500	Semi-finals	Semi-finals (BT)	Quarter-finals (BC)	Paul James
2006–07	BBL	I	1st	36	29	7	58	0.806	Semi-finals	1st round (BT)	Winners, beating Scottish (BC)	Paul James
2007–08	BBL	I	2nd	33	24	9	48	0.727	Winners, beating Milton Keynes	Winners, beating Newcastle (BT)	Semi-finals (BC)	Paul James
2008–09	BBL	I	4th	33	21	12	42	0.636	Quarter-finals	Runners-up (BT)	Semi-finals (BC)	Paul James
2009–10	BBL	I	11th	36	11	25	22	0.305	Did not qualify	Semi-finals (BT)	1st round (BC)	Chad McKnight
2010–11	BBL	I	7th	33	17	16	34	0.515	Quarter-finals	Runners-up (BT)	1st round (BC)	Creon Raftopoulos
2011–12	BBL	I	8th	30	12	18	24	0.400	Quarter-finals	1st round (BT)	1st round (BC)	Creon Raftopoulos
Surrey Heat
2012–13	BBL	I	4th	33	21	12	40	0.636	Semi-finals	Quarter-finals (BT)	Quarter-finals (BC)	Creon Raftopoulos
Surrey United
2013–14	BBL	I	11th	33	4	29	8	0.121	Did not qualify	1st round (BT)	1st round (BC)	Jack Majewski
2014–15	BBL	I	13th	36	5	31	10	0.139	Did not qualify	Quarter-finals (BT)	1st round (BC)	Jack Majewski

Season	Division	Tier	Regular Season						Post-Season	Trophy	Cup	Head coach
Season	Division	Tier	Finish	Played	Wins	Losses	Points	Win %	Post-Season	Trophy	Cup	Head coach
Surrey Scorchers
2015–16	BBL	1	12th	33	7	26	14	0.212	Did not qualify	Quarter-finals (BT)	1st round (BC)	Creon Raftopoulos
2016–17	BBL	1	8th	33	15	18	30	0.455	Quarter-finals, losing to Leicester	Quarter-finals (BT)	Semi-finals (BC)	Creon Raftopoulos
2017–18	BBL	1	5th	33	20	13	40	0.606	Quarter-finals, losing to Glasgow	1st round (BT)	Quarter-finals (BC)	Creon Raftopoulos
2018–19	BBL	1	12th	33	6	27	12	0.182	Did not qualify	1st round (BT)	1st round (BC)	Creon Raftopoulos
2019–20	BBL	1	Season cancelled due to COVID-19 pandemic							1st round (BT)	Pool Stage (BC)	Creon Raftopoulos
2020–21	BBL	1	9th	30	10	20	20	0.333	Did not qualify	Semi-finals (BT)	Quarter-finals (BC)	Creon Raftopoulos
2021–22	BBL	1	10th	27	2	25	4	0.074	Did not qualify	1st round (BT)	Quarter-finals (BC)	Creon Raftopoulos
2022–23	BBL	1	10th	36	4	32	8	0.111	Did not qualify	Quarter-finals (BT)	1st round (BC)	Lloyd Gardner
2023–24	BBL	1	8th	36	14	22	28	0.389		Pool Stage (BT)		Lloyd Gardner

== Honours ==
=== League ===
- BBL Championship Winners: 2006/07 1

=== Playoffs ===
- BBL Play Off Winners: 2007/08 1

=== Trophy ===
- BBL Trophy Winners: 2007/08 1

=== Cup ===
- BBL Cup Winners: 2006/07 1

== Players ==
=== Current roster ===
Note: Flags indicate national team, as has been defined under FIBA eligibility rules. Players may hold more than one non-FIBA nationality.

No.	Pos.	Nat.	Player
	C	(United Kingdom) GBR	Elliot Bailey
	SF	(United States) USA	Quin Cooper
	PG	(United States) USA	Cameron Gooden
	PF	(New Zealand) NZL	Jordan Hunt
	PF	(United States) USA	Saiquan Jamison
	PG	(United Kingdom) GBR	Andrew Lawrence
	SF	(Canada) CAN	Abdul Mohamed
	SF	(United Kingdom) GBR	Tayo Ogedengbe
	PG	(United Kingdom) GBR	Justin Robinson
	SG	(United Kingdom) GBR	Josh Steel
	SG	(South Sudan) SSD	Padiet Wang

=== Notable former players ===
Note: Flags indicate national team eligibility at FIBA-sanctioned events. Players may hold other non-FIBA nationalities not displayed.

Criteria

To appear in this section a player must have either:

- Set a club record or won an individual award while at the club
- Played at least one official international match for their national team at any time
- Played at least one official NBA match at any time.

- (United States) Carlton Aaron
- (Sudan) (United Kingdom) Ajou Deng
- (Albania) Elvisi Dusha
- (United States) (United Kingdom) Tony Dorsey
- (United States) Brian Dux
- (United States) Daniel Gilbert
- (United States) E.J. Harrison
- (United States) Keonta Howell
- (United Kingdom) James Jones
- (United Kingdom) Perry Lawson
- (United States) Dave Mallon
- (United Kingdom) Dan Wardrope
- (United Kingdom) Roderick Wellington
- (United States) Andrew Lasker

=== Retired numbers ===
No.	Nat.	Player	Tenure
6	(United States)	Brian Dux	2005–2007

== Head coaches ==
As of 30 August 2023

Name	From	To	Regular Season		Play-offs			Notes
Name	From	To	W	L	W	L	T	Notes
(United Kingdom) Paul James	2005	2009	94	48	5	3	–	
(United States) Chad McKnight	2009	2010	12	27	0	0	–	Player/coach
(Zimbabwe) Creon Raftopoulos	2010	2013	27	31	0	2	–	
(Poland) Jack Majewski	2013	2015	9	60	0	0	–	
(Zimbabwe) Creon Raftopoulos	2015	2022	65	138	1	2	1	
(United Kingdom) Lloyd Gardner	2022	2024	4	32	0	0	–	

== See also ==
- Basketball in England
- British Basketball League
- Thames Valley Tigers
