= BBL Championship =

Professional basketball league in the United Kingdom

- Current season, competition or edition: 2023–24 British Basketball League season
- The BBL Championship logo
- Sport: Basketball
- Founded: 1987
- First season: 1987–88
- Folded: 2023–24
- Organising body: British Basketball League
- No. of teams: 10
- Country: United Kingdom
- Continent: (European Union) FIBA Europe (Europe)
- Last champions: London Lions (3rd title)
- Most titles: Newcastle Eagles (7 titles)
- Broadcasters: Sky Sports; YouTube
- Level on pyramid: 1
- Domestic cups: BBL Cup; BBL Trophy
- Related competitions: EBL Championship; SBC Senior Men Division 1

The British Basketball League Championship, often shortened to the BBL Championship, was the top-level men's professional basketball league in the United Kingdom from 1987 until 2024. The competition was administered by the British Basketball League and comprised 10 teams from both England and Scotland. Each team played a 36-game regular season, from September until April, with the team that finished in first place being crowned as League champions.

Following the end of the regular season, the top eight-placed teams used to advance to the postseason Playoffs tournament to decide the winner of the BBL Playoffs.

The BBL used a franchise system, with no promotion or relegation from other leagues, although several clubs have been elected from the English National Basketball League in recent years.

== History ==
Since 1972, the English Basketball Association-operated semi-professional National Basketball League provided competition for the country's top basketball clubs. The league started with six clubs, but grew each year to include multiple divisions featuring teams from across England. However, by the mid-1980s, following an increase in the sport's popularity due to coverage from television network Channel 4, the League's foremost clubs – looking to improve the basketball's image through greater professionalism – broke away from the English Basketball Association and formed their own administration. The new organisation, simply called the Basketball League, was established in 1987 and saw a franchise-based set-up where every member would have an equal shareholding and a representative on the League's Board of Directors, and with no promotion or relegation to the lower leagues aiming at increasing the league's stability. The NBL's sponsorship deal from the Carlsberg Group continued with the new organisation and the newly founded Carlsberg League tipped off its inaugural season in 1987. A total of 15 teams took to the floor for the 1987–88 season, with the new League including all 13 former NBL teams present as well as drafting in new entrants Oldham Celtics (promoted from NBL Division 2) and Livingston (elected from the Scottish National League). The new league continued the NBL's policy of allowing only two import players to be registered per team. Portsmouth were the early pace-setters and pipped Kingston to the first regular-season League title but it was underdogs Livingston, the only member based outside England, that claimed the first Championship thanks to an 81–72 victory over Portsmouth in the Play-off Final.

Portsmouth's dominance was short-lived however and after a failed attempt to relocate to Reading, the franchise withdrew from the League in 1988. This was the beginning of a membership crisis for the Carlsberg League, with no fewer than seven teams withdrawing from the competition by the start of the 1989–90 season. With a lack of teams, the League opened up for expansion and brought in the newly rebranded London Docklands team along with Cheshire Jets and Worthing Bears from the NBL, whilst readmitting Birmingham Bullets and Hemel Royals over the next couple of seasons. In 1990, the league was rebranded as the Carlsberg League Division One, after the Carlsberg Group decided to extend its sponsorship to the lower leagues. Kingston dominated the League throughout its early years and under the guidance of Coach Kevin Cadle – the most successful coach in British Basketball history – netted four consecutive regular season and Championship titles from 1989 (as Glasgow Rangers) to 1992.

In 1993, the competition was rebranded again due to new sponsorship deal from Budweiser, thus becoming the Budweiser Basketball League. The addition of Sheffield Sharks (from the NBL) and the London-based Leopards in 1994 ushered in a new era for the League, with both teams utilising multimillion-pound arenas to stage home games. It was a huge step away from the traditional, small sports centre venues that were commonplace throughout the League (though London Docklands briefly used London Arena for home games). With financial backing from the Chrysalis Group, Sheffield stormed to their first League title in 1994–95 season – their rookie season. Following the demise of Kingston, who had since moved to Guildford to become the Guildford Kings, Worthing made their mark in history with three back-to-back Play-off Finals victories from 1993 to 1995. In 1995, the Budweiser League secured a deal with BSkyB to broadcast games live on its Sky Sports platform, which brought a greater following and popularity to the League. To increase playing standards and game quality, the League amended its rules a year later to allow teams to include five imported players on their roster.

By 1996, the Budweiser League had become more stable and comprised 13 teams, all of which were based in England and five of which were located in and around London (Crystal Palace, Hemel Royals, Leopards, London Towers and Thames Valley Tigers). The capital city enjoyed huge success throughout this period with Towers taking the 1996 League crown and Leopards scoring back-to-back League titles in 1997 and 1998 – where they won via head-to-head results over second placed Birmingham Bullets after both teams finished with 58 points. The spell of dominance from the South was broken by Birmingham's two Championship Final's victories in 1996 and 1998, against the Towers and Thames Valley Tigers respectively. The 1998–99 season saw a new addition to the League with the expansion of Edinburgh Rocks, who became the League's first Scottish-based team since Glasgow Rangers' and Livingston's participation in 1989. The 1999 Budweiser League title came down to a final game between title-chasing rivals Sheffield and Manchester Giants in front of more than 11,000 fans at Manchester's MEN Arena. With both teams tied on points at the top of the League table, and tied at 85–85 with just 3.5 seconds left in the game, Terrell Myers' last-gasp 18-foot buzzer-beating jump-shot claimed the regular season title for Sheffield. However it was the third-seed London Towers who went all the way in the post-season play-offs and took home the Championship crown.

Another change of sponsorship in 1999 saw the competition renamed as the Dairylea Dunkers Championship, whilst the League radically changed its structure to incorporate a conference-based system. The League's 13 teams were geographically divided into two conferences – seven teams in the North and six teams in the South – with the top four-placed teams in each conference advancing to the play-offs. Towers had dominated the South, whilst Giants gained revenge on Sheffield, pipping them to the Northern Conference crown. The Northern and Southern winner's were kept apart throughout the play-offs until the Final, where Manchester went on to beat Birmingham for the post-season title. The new millennium saw yet another name change as the competition was rebranded as the British Basketball League Championship following the end of Darylea's sponsorship in 2000 and the 2000–01 season saw one of the biggest upsets in BBL history as Leicester Riders, who finished with a 17–19 record in the regular season and were the lowest seeded team in the play-offs, went all the way to take the Championship silverware with a 75–84 in the Final over Sheffield. Following that season the League's TV broadcasting deal transferred from BSkyB to ITV Digital in a three-year contract agreement. Just months later the Manchester Giants became the first franchise to be removed from the competition by League officials due to unfulfilling a fixture and a lack of finance.

The 2001–02 season was a remarkable one for minor North-west club Chester Jets who were victorious in all four BBL competitions, winning the Northern Conference title, as well as the Play-off Championship, the BBL Trophy and the National Cup. The accomplishment was dubbed the "Jetwash" by fans and the media, and had last been achieved by the former Kingston franchise in 1992. By the end of the campaign though, the BBL had lost another franchise following Derby Storm's decision to withdraw, and the collapse of ITV Digital during the summer of 2002 brought financial instability to the League and due to the decreased membership, the competition abolished its Conference structure and returned to a single league format. Scottish Rocks went on to win the 2003 Championship title becoming the first non-English team to win since Glasgow Rangers 14 years earlier. With the loss of the Leopards franchise in 2003, the Championship now consisted of just 10 teams. Plymouth Raiders, a powerhouse of the lower divisions, stepped up to the BBL in 2004 and joined as the Championship's eleventh team. The withdrawal of Thames Valley Tigers in 2005 brought about another membership shake-up as Tigers fans, determined not to lose professional basketball in their locality, established the Guildford Heat as the BBL's first supporter-owned franchise. The 2005–06 season saw Newcastle Eagles enjoy their most successful season to date and as they joined Chester and Kingston as the only teams to win a "grand slam" of League, Play-off, BBL Trophy and Cup titles in the same season.

The summer of 2006 saw major upheaval within the BBL's membership as three long-standing franchises – Birmingham Bullets, Brighton Bears and London Towers – all withdrew from the League. With no BBL representation from the country's two biggest cities (Birmingham and London), the League elected lower division teams London United and Midlands-based Worcester Wolves to keep the number of teams at 10 for the upcoming season. United's stay within the BBL lasted only for one season as they too would be forced to withdraw prior to the start of the 2007–08 season due to the loss of its major sponsor. However the Championship saw the addition of three more teams prior to the season tip-off, with English Basketball League team London Capital stepping-up and new franchises Birmingham Panthers and Everton Tigers bringing the number of competing teams to 12. This kick-started another period of instability which saw no fewer than 12 new expansion franchises being drafted in over a period seven years (until 2014), six of which later withdrew or folded due to various issues. Newcastle continued their dynasty of success by claiming a further five Championship titles in seven seasons, from 2005 to 2012, along with many other accolades. Only Guildford Heat in 2008 and Everton/Mersey Tigers, in 2010 and 2011, were able to break their run. Challenging Newcastle's dominance were Leicester Riders who, despite finishing as Finalists in 2012 to Eagles, claimed a treble the following season with victories in the League, Championship Play-offs and BBL Cup.

== Format ==
=== Regular season ===
The competition features all member teams playing a 30-game regular season (in a round robin format), from September through to April. Matches are played according to FIBA rules and games consist of four quarters of 10 minutes each. Two points are awarded for a win, with overtime used if the score is tied at the final buzzer – unlimited numbers of 5 minute overtime periods are played until one team is ahead when a period ends. At the end of the regular season, the team with the most points is crowned as winners of the BBL Championship, and thus British Champions. If points are equal between two or more teams then head-to-head results between said teams are used to determine the winners. In the case of a tie between multiple teams where this does not break the tie, the winners are then determined by the points difference in the games between said teams. Following the completion of the Championship regular season, the top-eight ranked teams advance into the post-season Championship Play-offs which usually take place during April.

In the regular season, team schedules are not identical and neither are matchdays, with games scheduled mainly around venue availability. Because of this, teams may find themselves playing a series of home games consecutively followed by a straight set of away games. As the season is also particularly short many games are played over weekends as 'doubleheaders, whereby a team will play games (possibly a home and away game) on consecutive days, something that is not commonplace in British sports, although often seen in the National Basketball Association and other North American sports.

=== BBL Playoffs ===
The postseason BBL Playoffs usually takes place in April and May, featuring the top eight ranked teams from the regular season compete in a knockout tournament. Teams are seeded depending on their final positioning in the Championship standings, so first-place faces eighth-place, second versus seventh-place, third against sixth-place and finally fourth plays the fifth-placed team. Both the Quarterfinals and the succeeding Semifinals are played over a two-game series (home & away) with the higher seed having choice of home advantage in the either the first or second leg – an aggregated score over the two games will determine which team will advance to the next stage. As with the Quarterfinals, teams in the Semifinals are also seeded, with the highest-ranking team drawn against the lowest-ranking team in one Semifinal and the two remaining teams drawn together in the other Semifinal. The culmination of the postseason is the Grand Final, held at The O2 Arena in London, which sees the two Semifinal winners play a one-game event to determine the BBL Playoff winners.

== Sponsorship ==
Throughout its history the competition has been sponsored by several businesses, which have resulted in the trophy being renamed in accordance with the sponsor's branding.

Period	Sponsor	Name
1987–1990	Carlsberg Group	Carlsberg Basketball League
1990–1993	Carlsberg Group	Carlsberg League Division One
1993–1999	Budweiser	Budweiser Basketball League
1999–2000	Dairylea	Dairylea Dunker's Championship
2000–present	No main sponsor	BBL Championship

== BBL Playoff winners ==
Season	Winner	Score	Runners-up	Venue	Location	MVP
1987–88	Livingston	81–72	Portsmouth	Wembley Arena	London	(United Kingdom) Graeme Hill
1988–89	Glasgow Rangers	89–86	Livingston	National Exhibition Centre	Birmingham	(United States) Alan Cunningham
1989–90	Kingston	87–82	Sunderland Saints	National Exhibition Centre	Birmingham	(United States) Alan Cunningham
1990–91	Kingston	94–72	Sunderland Saints	National Exhibition Centre	Birmingham	(United States) Alton Byrd
1991–92	Kingston	84–67	Thames Valley Tigers	Wembley Arena	London	(United States) Russ Saunders
1992–93	Worthing Bears	75–74	Thames Valley Tigers	Wembley Arena	London	(United States) Cleave Lewis
1993–94	Worthing Bears	71–65	Guildford Kings	Wembley Arena	London	(United States) Colin Irish
1994–95	Worthing Bears	77–73	Manchester Giants	Wembley Arena	London	(United States) Alan Cunningham
1995–96	Birmingham Bullets	89–72	London Towers	Wembley Arena	London	(United States) Tony Dorsey
1996–97	London Towers	89–88	Leopards	Wembley Arena	London	(United States) Keith Robinson
1997–98	Birmingham Bullets	78–75	Thames Valley Tigers	Wembley Arena	London	(United States) Tony Dorsey
1998–99	London Towers	82–71	Thames Valley Tigers	Wembley Arena	London	(United States) Danny Lewis
1999–00	Manchester Giants	74–65	Birmingham Bullets	Wembley Arena	London	(United States) Tony Dorsey
2000–01	Leicester Riders	84–75	Chester Jets	Wembley Arena	London	(United States) Larry Johnson
2001–02	Chester Jets	93–82	Sheffield Sharks	Wembley Arena	London	(United Kingdom) John McCord
2002–03	Scottish Rocks	83–76	Brighton Bears	National Indoor Arena	Birmingham	(Trinidad and Tobago) Shawn Myers
2003–04	Sheffield Sharks	86–74	Chester Jets	National Indoor Arena	Birmingham	(United States) Lynard Stewart
2004–05	Newcastle Eagles	78–75	Chester Jets	National Indoor Arena	Birmingham	(United Kingdom) Andrew Sullivan
2005–06	Newcastle Eagles	83–68	Scottish Rocks	National Indoor Arena	Birmingham	(United Kingdom) Fabulous Flournoy
2006–07	Newcastle Eagles	95–82	Scottish Rocks	Metro Radio Arena	Newcastle upon Tyne	(United Kingdom) Olu Babalola
2007–08	Guildford Heat	100–88	Milton Keynes Lions	National Indoor Arena	Birmingham	(United States) Daniel Gilbert
2008–09	Newcastle Eagles	87–84	Everton Tigers	National Indoor Arena	Birmingham	(United States) Trey Moore
2009–10	Everton Tigers	80–72	Glasgow Rocks	National Indoor Arena	Birmingham	(United States) Kevin Bell
2010–11	Mersey Tigers	79–74	Sheffield Sharks	National Indoor Arena	Birmingham	(United Kingdom) James Jones
2011–12	Newcastle Eagles	71–62	Leicester Riders	National Indoor Arena	Birmingham	(United Kingdom) Charles Smith
2012–13	Leicester Riders	68–57	Newcastle Eagles	Wembley Arena	London	(United States) Jay Cousinard
2013–14	Worcester Wolves	90–78	Newcastle Eagles	Wembley Arena	London	(United States) Zaire Taylor
2014–15	Newcastle Eagles	96–84	London Lions	O2 Arena	London	(United States) Rahmon Fletcher
2015–16	Sheffield Sharks	84–74	Leicester Riders	O2 Arena	London	(Canada) Mike Tuck
2016–17	Leicester Riders	84–63	Newcastle Eagles	O2 Arena	London	(Sweden) Pierre Hampton
2017–18	Leicester Riders	81–60	London Lions	O2 Arena	London	(United States) TrayVonn Wright
2018–19	Leicester Riders	93–61	London City Royals	O2 Arena	London	(United States) Timothy Williams
2020–21	Newcastle Eagles	68–66	London Lions	Morningside Arena	Leicester	(United States) Cortez Edwards
2021–22	Leicester Riders	78–75	London Lions	O2 Arena	London	(United States) Geno Crandall
2022–23	London Lions	88–80	Leicester Riders	O2 Arena	London	(United States) Jordan Taylor
2023–24	London Lions	88–85	Cheshire Phoenix	O2 Arena	London	(United States) Sam Dekker

== Honours board ==
Rank	Team	Wins	RU	Wins	RU	Wins	RU	Wins	RU	Wins	RU
Rank	Team	BBL Championship		BBL Playoffs		BBL Cup		BBL Trophy		Total	
1	Newcastle Eagles	7	6	7	5	7	4	7	4	28	19
2	Leicester Riders	6	4	6	3	4	5	3	4	19	16
3	Guildford Kings^{†}	4	1	4	1	4	0	3	1	15	3
4	Sheffield Sharks	4	6	2	3	6	2	2	2	14	13
5	Cheshire Phoenix	2	2	1	3	2	2	6	3	11	10
6	London Towers^{†}	4	1	2	1	1	1	3	2	10	5
7	London Lions	3	2	2	5	3	1	1	4	9	12
8	Brighton Bears^{†}	2	3	3	1	3	1	0	3	8	8
9	Thames Valley Tigers^{†}	1	4	0	4	2	3	4	0	7	11
10	Mersey Tigers^{†}	1	1	2	1	1	1	1	0	5	3
11	Surrey Scorchers	1	1	1	0	1	0	1	2	4	3
12	Manchester Giants^{†}	1	2	1	1	0	2	1	4	3	9
13	Essex Leopards^{†}	2	1	0	1	2	0	0	0	3	4
14	Worcester Wolves^{†}	0	0	1	0	1	1	1	0	3	1
15	Caledonia Gladiators	0	1	1	3	0	4	1	1	2	9
16	Livingston^{†}	0	1	1	0	0	0	1	1	2	3
17	Birmingham Bullets^{†}	0	1	2	1	0	1	0	0	2	3
18	Plymouth Raiders^{†}	0	0	0	0	0	2	1	3	1	5
19	Portsmouth^{†}	1	0	0	1	0	1	0	0	1	3
20	London City Royals^{†}	0	0	0	1	0	0	1	0	1	1
21	Derby Storm^{†}	0	0	0	0	0	0	0	1	0	1
22	Solent Kestrels	0	0	0	0	0	0	0	1	0	1
23	Bristol Flyers	0	0	0	0	0	1	0	0	0	1
24	Manchester Giants	0	0	0	0	0	1	0	0	0	1

*Note: † Defunct club.

*Note: This is a ranking of all BBL clubs titles won both throughout BBL history and including pre-BBL titles.

*Note: Manchester Giants refers to the first franchise with this name rather than the current franchise of the same name.

Source: Honours board

== See also ==
- Basketball in England
- British Basketball League
- BBL Cup
- BBL Trophy
