= 2000–01 British Basketball League season =

2000–01 BBL season
- League: British Basketball League
- Sport: Basketball

Roll of Honour
- BBL champions: N Sheffield Sharks; S London Towers
- Play Off's champions: Leicester Riders
- National Cup champions: Leicester Riders
- BBL Trophy champions: Chester Jets

British Basketball League seasons
- ← 1999–2000 2001–02 →

The 2000–01 BBL season, the 14th since its establishment of the British Basketball League, commenced on 30 September 2000 and ended on 7 April 2001, with a total of 13 teams competing. The regular season saw teams split into two geographically divided Conferences, seven in the North and six in the South, with northern teams playing 36 games and southern teams playing 34 games each. Sheffield Sharks were crowned winners of the North, while London Towers dominated the South, both teams tallying 27 wins in the regular season.

Played in parallel with the regular season, the BBL’s peripheral competition the uni-ball Trophy was conquered by Chester Jets, after a 92-81 win against Newcastle Eagles. Teams also contested the NTL National Cup with clubs from the lower placed National Basketball League, with Leicester Riders prevailing in a close final against Greater London Leopards.

Following the regular season, the top-four teams from each Conference progressed to the play-offs which ran from 14 April to 5 May, climaxing with the Play-off Final at Wembley Arena. Leicester Riders shocked bookmakers and fans alike, taking the Championship title with an 84-75 victory over Sheffield, adding to their National Cup success.

London Towers was the league’s sole representative in European competition, appearing in the Euroleague. They failed to make the Round of 16, finishing 5th in the 6-team Group D with a 1-9 record.

== Notable occurrences ==
- London Towers opened their campaign in the Euroleague with an 86-61 win against the Frankfurt Skyliners on 18 October 2000. Kendrick Warren posted a game-high 21 points for the Towers.
- On 6 November, Derby Storm's 104-84 home victory over Edinburgh Rocks ended the BBL’s longest ever losing streak, with Storm’s last league win coming on 26 March, an 88-91 victory away to Milton Keynes Lions.
- Greater London Leopards undertook a mid-season tour of the United States throughout November, playing some of the top college teams in the country, finishing with a 2-3 record.
- Birmingham Bullets’ attempt to sign Panamanian Antonio García, after he walked out on Derby a day earlier, was taken to court after Derby refused to release his registration.
- Leicester Riders were crowned NTL National Cup champions on 7 January 2001, with an 84-82 win over Greater London Leopards at the Sheffield Arena ending a 30-year hunt for silverware.
- The Northern Conference conquered in the annual All-Star Game, with a 161-148 victory over their Southern counterparts at the Telewest Arena on 20 January. Newcastle Eagles’ Tony Windless was voted MVP after scoring 25 points, while Thames Valley Tigers’ Tony Christie posted a game-high 29 points for the South.
- Chester Jets won the uni-ball Trophy on 24 March, with a 92-81 win against Newcastle at the National Indoor Arena in Birmingham. The celebrations were even more noticeable after Chester coach Robbie Peers and the Jets team performed a conga-line around the court. Jets' Pero Cameron was named as MVP.
- Leicester claimed their second piece of silverware for the season, adding the Play-off title to their earlier National Cup victory. Riders claimed the win on 5 May at Wembley Arena with an 84-75 victory over Sheffield Sharks, shooting an overall 57% from the floor. Larry Johnson was named as MVP.

== BBL Championship (Tier 1) ==
=== Final standings ===
==== Northern Conference ====
Pos	Team	Pld	W	L	%	Pts
1	Sheffield Sharks	36	27	9	0.750	54
2	Chester Jets	36	25	11	0.694	50
3	Newcastle Eagles	36	20	16	0.555	40
4	Leicester Riders	36	17	19	0.472	34
5	Manchester Giants	36	15	21	0.416	30
6	Derby Storm	36	6	30	0.166	12
7	Edinburgh Rocks	36	5	31	0.138	10

==== Southern Conference ====
Pos	Team	Pld	W	L	%	Pts
1	London Towers	34	27	7	0.794	54
2	Greater London Leopards	34	24	10	0.705	48
3	Milton Keynes Lions	34	21	13	0.617	42
4	Birmingham Bullets	34	18	16	0.529	36
5	Thames Valley Tigers	34	14	20	0.411	28
6	Brighton Bears	34	9	25	0.264	18

= Conference winners
= Qualified for the play-offs

=== Playoffs ===
==== 1st round ====
14 April 2001

Birmingham Bullets	80–75	Newcastle Eagles

SkyDome Arena, Coventry

14 April 2001

Leicester Riders	77–75	Milton Keynes Lions

SkyDome Arena, Coventry

==== Quarter-finals ====
16 April 2001

Chester Jets	71–90	Leicester Riders

SkyDome Arena, Coventry

16 April 2001

Greater London Leopards	89–84	Birmingham Bullets

SkyDome Arena, Coventry

==== Semi-finals ====
21 April 2001

London Towers	79–87	Leicester Riders

SkyDome Arena, Coventry

21 April 2001

Sheffield Sharks	87–77	Greater London Leopards

SkyDome Arena, Coventry

==== Final ====
5 May 2001
5.45pm GMT

Report

Sheffield Sharks	75–84	Leicester Riders
Scoring by quarter: 24-15, 21-21, 12-28, 18-20
Pts: Terrell Myers 14, Peter Scantlebury 14, Nate Reinking 12; Rebs: Peter Scantlebury 10; Asts: Peter Scantlebury 6		Pts: Ralph Blalock 25, Larry Johnson 24, Purnell Perry, 13, Rebs: Purnell Perry 12; Asts: Larry Johnson 8

Wembley Arena, London

== National League Conference (Tier 2) ==
=== Final standings ===
Pos	Team	Pld	W	L	%	Pts
1	Plymouth Raiders	21	19	2	0.905	38
2	Worthing Thunder Rebels	21	16	5	0.762	32
3	Teesside Mohawks	21	15	6	0.714	30
4	Manchester Magic	21	9	12	0.429	18
5	Coventry Crusaders	21	7	14	0.333	14
6	Inter-Basket London +	21	7	14	0.333	13
7	Solent Stars	21	6	15	0.286	12
8	Sutton Pumas	21	5	16	0.238	10

= League winners
= Qualified for the play-offs

+ one point deducted
Play Off Final - Plymouth 83 Worthing 77

== National League Division 1 (Tier 3) ==
=== Final standings ===
Pos	Team	Pld	W	L	%	Pts
1	Oxford Devils	18	17	1	0.944	34
2	Reading Rockets	18	13	5	0.722	26
3	Westminster Warriors	18	9	9	0.500	18
4	Cardiff Clippers	18	8	10	0.444	16
5	Kingston Wildcats	18	6	12	0.333	12
6	Birmingham Aces	18	6	12	0.333	12
7	Liverpool	18	2	16	0.111	4

= League winners
= Qualified for the play-offs

Play Off Final - Reading 97 Oxford 82

== National League Division 2 (Tier 4) ==
=== Final standings ===
Pos	Team	Pld	W	L	%	Pts
1	Derbyshire Arrows	24	24	0	1.000	48
2	Ealing Tornadoes	24	20	4	0.833	40
3	Ware Rebels	24	17	7	0.718	34
4	Hull Icebergs	24	16	8	0.667	32
5	North London Lords	24	15	9	0.625	30
6	Doncaster Panthers	24	12	12	0.500	24
7	Taunton Tigers	24	12	12	0.500	24
8	Mansfield Express	24	11	13	0.458	22
9	NW London Wolverines	24	9	15	0.375	18
10	Northampton Neptunes	24	7	17	0.292	14
11	Brixton TopCats	24	6	18	0.250	12
12	South London Bulls	24	5	19	0.208	10
13	Swindon Sonics	24	3	21	0.125	6

= League winners
= Qualified for the play-offs

Play Off Final - Ealing v Derbyshire 82-81

== National League Division 3 (Tier 5) ==
=== Final standings ===
Pos	Team	Pld	W	L	%	Pts
1	Bristol Bombers	22	20	2	0.909	40
2	Worcester Wolves	22	18	4	0.818	36
3	Thames Valley Tigers II	22	18	4	0.818	36
4	Dudley Bears	22	12	10	0.545	24
5	Barking & Dag. Erkenwald	22	11	11	0.500	22
6	Nottingham College	22	11	11	0.500	22
7	Brighton Cougars	22	11	11	0.500	22
8	University of Birmingham	22	10	12	0.455	20
9	Northumbria University	22	8	14	0.364	16
10	Tamar Valley Cannons	22	6	16	0.273	12
11	Derby Storm II	22	3	19	0.136	6
12	Colchester Alliance	22	3	19	0.136	6'

= League winners
= Qualified for the play-offs

Play Off Final - Bristol v Barking & Dagenham Erkenwald 89-67

== NTL National Cup ==
=== Last 16 ===
Team 1	Team 2	Score
Worthing Thunder	Greater London Leopards	67-108
Thames Valley Tigers	Sheffield Sharks	112-100
Brighton Bears	Manchester Giants	72-74
Chester Jets	Newcastle Eagles	85-100
Teesside Mohawks	Leicester Riders	102-110
Birmingham Bullets	Solent Stars	109-61
Derby Storm	Edinburgh Rocks	86-59
Milton Keynes Lions	London Towers	81-83

=== Quarter-finals ===
Team 1	Team 2	Score
Derby Storm	Thames Valley Tigers	74-87
London Towers	Manchester Giants	70-61
Greater London Leopards	Newcastle Eagles	103-100
Birmingham Bullets	Leicester Riders	109-118

=== Semi-finals ===
Team 1	Team 2	Score
Leicester Riders	Thames Valley Tigers	95-85
Greater London Leopards	London Towers	84-82

=== Final ===
7 January 2001

Leicester Riders	84–82	Greater London Leopards
Pts: Ralph Blalock 26, Larry Johnson 21, Billy Singleton 12, Malcolm Leak 10, Purnell Perry 9		Pts: Rob Brown 22, Rashod Johnson 16, Maurice Robinson 14, Rico Alderson 13, Jason Kimbrough 9

Sheffield Arena

== uni-ball Trophy ==
=== Group stage ===
Group A

Team	Pts	Pld	W	L	Percent
1.Chester Jets	10	6	5	1	0.833
2.Greater London Leopards	8	6	4	2	0.666
3.Sheffield Sharks	6	6	3	3	0.500
4.Brighton Bears	0	6	0	6	0.000

- Sheffield qualified as the third-place team with the best record on basket difference.

Group B

Team	Pts	Pld	W	L	Percent
1.Thames Valley Tigers	8	6	4	2	0.666
2.Derby Storm	6	6	3	3	0.500
3.Birmingham Bullets	6	6	3	3	0.500
4.Leicester Riders	4	6	2	4	0.333

- Derby qualified ahead of Birmingham on head-to-head results, losing 76-74 and winning 106-90.

Group C

Team	Pts	Pld	W	L	Percent
1.Newcastle Eagles	10	6	5	1	0.833
2.Milton Keynes Lions	8	6	4	2	0.666
3.Manchester Giants	6	6	3	3	0.500
4.Edinburgh Rocks	0	6	0	6	0.000

- London Towers received a bye into the Quarter-finals, due to scheduling conflicts with their Euroleague campaign.

=== Quarter-finals ===
3 February 2001

Chester Jets	82–74	Derby Storm

SkyDome Arena, Coventry

3 February 2001

London Towers	70–74	Sheffield Sharks

SkyDome Arena, Coventry

3 February 2001

Greater London Leopards	78–87	Newcastle Eagles

SkyDome Arena, Coventry

3 February 2001

Milton Keynes Lions	81–86	Thames Valley Tigers

SkyDome Arena, Coventry

=== Semi-finals ===
9 February 2001

Newcastle Eagles	87–84	Thames Valley Tigers

SkyDome Arena, Coventry

9 February 2001

Chester Jets	69–64	Sheffield Sharks

SkyDome Arena, Coventry

=== Final ===
24 March 2001

Report

Chester Jets	92–81	Newcastle Eagles
Scoring by quarter: 27-24, 22-13, 20-29, 23-15
Pts: Loren Meyer, 26, Pero Cameron 20, Duane Clemens 16, James Hamilton 16		Pts: Tony Windless 29, TJ Walker 11, Donnie Johnson 11, Brian Ehlers 11

National Indoor Arena, Birmingham

== All-Star Game ==
20 January 2001

Northern All-Stars	161–148	Southern All-Stars
Pts: Tony Windless, 25		Pts: Tony Christie, 29

Telewest Arena, Newcastle upon Tyne

Northern All-Stars
Player	Team
(United States) James Hamilton	Chester Jets
(United States) Malcolm Leak	Leicester Riders
(United States) Donnie Johnson	Newcastle Eagles
(United States) Loren Meyer	Chester Jets
(United States) Barry Bowman	Derby Storm
(United States) Purnell Perry	Leicester Riders
(United States) Justin Phoenix	Manchester Giants
(United States) Terrell Myers	Sheffield Sharks
(United States) (United Kingdom) Tony Windless	Newcastle Eagles
(United States) Ted Berry	Edinburgh Rocks
(United States) Ralph Blalock	Leicester Riders
(United States) (United Kingdom) Nate Reinking	Sheffield Sharks
Coach
(United Kingdom) Robbie Peers	Chester Jets

Southern All-Stars
Player	Team
(Panama) Antonio Garcia	Birmingham Bullets
(United States) John McCord	Thames Valley Tigers
(Barbados) Andrew Alleyne	Milton Keynes Lions
(United States) Kendrick Warren	London Towers
(United States) (Republic of Ireland) Jason Siemon	Milton Keynes Lions
(United States) Rashod Johnson	Greater London Leopards
(United States) Wilbur Johnson	Brighton Bears
(United States) Tony Christie	Thames Valley Tigers
(United States) Brant Bailey	Birmingham Bullets
(United States) Maurice Robinson	Greater London Leopards
(Barbados) (United Kingdom) Nigel Lloyd	Milton Keynes Lions
(United States) Randy Duck	London Towers
Coach
(United States) Nick Nurse	Brighton Bears

== Statistics leaders ==
Category	Player	Stat
Points per game	(United States) (United Kingdom) John McCord (Thames Valley)	25.50
Rebounds per game	(Panama) Antonio García (Derby/Birmingham)	14.90
Assists per game	(Barbados) Nigel Lloyd (Milton Keynes)	5.86

== Seasonal awards ==
- Most Valuable Player: Loren Meyer (Chester Jets)
- Coach of the Year: Robbie Peers (Chester Jets)
- All-Star First Team:
  - Loren Meyer (Chester Jets)
  - Kendrick Warren (London Towers)
  - Steve Bucknall (London Towers)
  - Tony Windless (Newcastle Eagles)
  - John McCord (Thames Valley Tigers)
- All-Star Second Team:
  - James Hamilton (Chester Jets)
  - Nate Reinking (Sheffield Sharks)
  - Barry Bowman (Derby Storm)
  - Nigel Lloyd (Milton Keynes Lions)
  - Terrell Myers (Sheffield Sharks)

Preceded by 1999–2000 season	BBL seasons 2000–01	Succeeded by 2001–02 season
