= 2002–03 British Basketball League season =

2002–03 BBL season
- League: British Basketball League
- Sport: Basketball

Roll of Honour
- BBL champions: Sheffield Sharks
- Play Off's champions: Scottish Rocks
- National Cup champions: Brighton Bears
- BBL Trophy champions: Chester Jets

British Basketball League seasons
- 2001–02 2003–04

The 2002–03 BBL season was the 16th campaign in the history of the British Basketball League.

== Teams ==
Locations of the 2002–03 BBL teams

Team	City/Area	Arena	Capacity	Last season
Birmingham Bullets	Birmingham	Aston Events Centre	2,000	5th (South)
Brighton Bears	Brighton	Brighton Centre & Burgess Hill Triangle	3,600; 1,800	2nd (South)
Chester Jets	Chester	Northgate Arena	1,000	1st (North)
Essex Leopards	Brentwood	Brentwood Centre	2,000	4th (South)
Leicester Riders	Loughborough	Loughborough University	1,000	5th (North)
London Towers	London	Crystal Palace National Sports Centre	3,500	1st (South)
Milton Keynes Lions	Milton Keynes	Bletchley Centre	800	3rd (North)
Newcastle Eagles	Newcastle upon Tyne	Telewest Arena	6,500	3rd (North)
Scottish Rocks	Glasgow	Braehead Arena	4,000	4th (North)
Sheffield Sharks	Sheffield	Hallam FM Arena & Ponds Forge	8,500; 1,600	2nd (North)
Thames Valley Tigers	Bracknell	John Nike Sports Centre	1,000	6th (South)

== Notable occurrences ==
- Attracted by the opening of the brand-new 4,000-seat Braehead Arena in Glasgow, Edinburgh Rocks uprooted from their aging Meadowbank venue in Edinburgh and moved 45 miles west to Scotland's largest city Glasgow, and rebranded as the Scottish Rocks. The move received a mixed response from fans; whilst many said that the move would not work, the official supporters club backed the franchise's decision.
- Although based in Brentwood, Essex for the past two years, Greater London Leopards eventually rebranded the franchise as the Essex Leopards prior to the season starting.
- Due to a decreasing membership, the league abolished the Conference system it had imposed for the past three seasons and returned the regular single-league table set-up, with the top eight teams progressing to the play-offs.

== BBL Championship (Tier 1) ==
=== Final standings ===
Pos	Team	Pld	W	L	%	Pts
1	Sheffield Sharks	40	33	7	0.825	66
2	Brighton Bears	40	30	10	0.750	60
3	Chester Jets	40	28	12	0.700	56
4	Thames Valley Tigers	40	26	14	0.650	52
5	Newcastle Eagles	40	25	15	0.625	50
6	Scottish Rocks	40	22	18	0.550	44
7	London Towers	40	19	21	0.475	38
8	Milton Keynes Lions	40	12	28	0.300	24
9	Birmingham Bullets	40	11	29	0.275	22
10	Essex Leopards	40	11	29	0.275	22
11	Leicester Riders	40	3	37	0.075	6

= League winners
= Qualified for the play-offs

=== Playoffs ===
Quarter-finals
1	Sheffield Sharks	90 (OT)
8	Milton Keynes Lions	83
3	Chester Jets	84
6	Scottish Rocks	89
2	Brighton Bears	89
7	London Towers	82
4	Thames Valley Tigers	85
5	Newcastle Eagles	101

Semi-finals
1	Sheffield Sharks	74
6	Scottish Rocks	76
2	Brighton Bears	88
5	Newcastle Eagles	83

Final
6	Scottish Rocks	83
2	Brighton Bears	76

==== Quarter-finals ====
19 April 2003

Sheffield Sharks	90–83 (OT)	Milton Keynes Lions

Ponds Forge, Sheffield

19 April 2003

Chester Jets	84–89	Scottish Rocks

Northgate Arena, Chester

19 April 2003

Thames Valley Tigers	85–101	Newcastle Eagles

John Nike Sports Centre, Bracknell

20 April 2003

Brighton Bears	89–82	London Towers

Brighton Centre, Brighton

==== Semi-finals ====
3 May 2003

Brighton Bears	88–83	Newcastle Eagles

National Indoor Arena, Birmingham

3 May 2003

Sheffield Sharks	74–76	Scottish Rocks

National Indoor Arena, Birmingham

==== Final ====
4 May 2003
5.00pm GMT

Report

Brighton Bears	76–83	Scottish Rocks
Scoring by quarter: 23-18, 25-28, 20-20, 8-17
Pts: Sterling Davis 18, Ralph Blalock 17, Rico Alderson 13		Pts: Shawn Myers 26, Stephan Sheckles 14, Ryan Huntley 13, Billy Singleton 13

National Indoor Arena, Birmingham

== National League Conference (Tier 2) ==
=== Final standings ===
Pos	Team	Pld	W	L	%	Pts
1	Teesside Mohawks	22	21	1	0.955	42
2	Plymouth Raiders	22	18	4	0.818	36
3	Reading Rockets	22	16	6	0.727	32
4	Worthing Thunder	22	15	7	0.682	30
5	Manchester Magic	22	12	10	0.545	24
6	Kingston Wildcats	22	11	11	0.500	22
7	Sutton Pumas	22	11	11	0.500	22
8	Oxford Devils	22	11	11	0.500	22
9	Solent Stars	22	7	15	0.318	14
10	Ware Rebels	22	4	18	0.182	8
11	Hackney White Heat	22	3	19	0.136	6
12	Coventry Crusaders	22	3	19	0.136	6

= League winners
= Qualified for the play-offs

== National Cup ==
=== Last 16 ===
Team 1	Team 2	Score
Kingston Wildcats	Essex Leopards	73-102
Manchester Magic	Birmingham Bullets	82-85
Teesside Mohawks	Leicester Riders	98-97
Scottish Rocks	Chester Jets	63-88
Solent Stars	Brighton Bears	60-99
Sheffield Sharks	Newcastle Eagles	78-80
Plymouth Raiders	Thames Valley Tigers	71-113
Milton Keynes Lions	London Towers	84-98

=== Quarter-finals ===
Team 1	Team 2	Score
Birmingham Bullets	Chester Jets	94-98
Essex Leopards	London Towers	89-100 OT
Brighton Bears	Newcastle Eagles	91-73
Teesside Mohawks	Thames Valley Tigers	84-111

=== Semi-finals ===
Team 1	Team 2	Score
Chester Jets	Thames Valley Tigers	96-76
London Towers	Brighton Bears	80-84

=== Final ===
12 January 2003

Brighton Bears	89–79	Chester Jets
Pts: Wilbur Johnson (MVP) 24, Ralph Blalock 22, Sterling Davis 15		Pts: John McCord 28, Kenny Gregory 25, Pero Cameron 15

National Indoor Arena

== BBL Trophy ==
This season's BBL Trophy featured all 11 BBL teams plus one invited teams from the English Basketball League, the Teesside Mohawks to bring the total number of teams divided evenly. The First round saw all 12 teams split into four regionalised groups with the top finishing team advancing to the semi-finals.

=== Group stage ===
Northern Group 1

Team	Pts	Pld	W	L	Percent
1.Chester Jets	6	4	3	1	0.750
2.Sheffield Sharks	6	4	3	1	0.750
3.Leicester Riders	0	4	0	4	0.000

Southern Group 1

Team	Pts	Pld	W	L	Percent
1.Birmingham Bullets	6	4	3	1	0.750
2.Essex Leopards	4	4	2	2	0.500
3.Milton Keynes Lions	2	4	1	3	0.250

Northern Group 2

Team	Pts	Pld	W	L	Percent
1.Newcastle Eagles	8	4	4	0	1.000
2.Scottish Rocks	4	4	2	2	0.500
3.Teesside Mohawks	0	4	0	4	0.000

Southern Group 2

Team	Pts	Pld	W	L	Percent
1.London Towers	4	4	2	2	0.500
2.Thames Valley Tigers	4	4	2	2	0.500
3.Brighton Bears	4	4	2	2	0.500

=== Semi-finals ===
8 February 2003

Chester Jets	97–89	Newcastle Eagles

Aston Events Centre, Birmingham

8 February 2003

Birmingham Bullets	62–86	London Towers

Aston Events Centre, Birmingham

=== Final ===
15 March 2003

Report

Chester Jets	84–82	London Towers
Scoring by quarter: 30-26, 26-17, 13-22, 15-17
Pts: Kenny Gregory 24, Todd Cauthorn 19, John McCord 16		Pts: Kendrick Warren 21, Theo Dixon 18, Shaheen Holloway 15

Hallam FM Arena, Sheffield

== Statistics leaders ==
Category	Player	Stat
Points per game	(United States) Kenny Gregory (Chester Jets)	24.7
Rebounds per game	(United States) David Fisher (Essex Leopards)	10.5
Assists per game	(United States) John Thomas (Chester Jets)	7.3

Preceded by 2001–02 season	BBL seasons 2002–03	Succeeded by 2003–04 season
