= 2001–02 British Basketball League season =

2001–02 BBL season
- League: British Basketball League
- Sport: Basketball

Roll of Honour
- BBL champions: N Chester Jets; S London Towers
- Play Off's champions: Chester Jets
- National Cup champions: Chester Jets
- BBL Trophy champions: Chester Jets

British Basketball League seasons
- ← 2000–01 2002–03 →

The 2001–02 BBL season was the 15th season in the history of the British Basketball League. The regular season ran from September 27, 2001, to March 31, 2002, whilst the post-season Play-offs culminated with the Grand Final at Wembley Arena on April 27. Chester Jets claimed a famous "clean-sweep" by winning all three BBL competitions as well as the ntl:home National Cup. Jets' head coach Robbie Peers was awarded the League's Coach of the Year accolade whilst John Thomas, also of the Jets, claimed that Player of the Year award.

London Towers represented the United Kingdom in Europe's most prestigious competition, the Euroleague, however the capital-based team came up against giants Kinder Bologna, FC Barcelona and Union Olimpija in Group B and eventually finished with a 0-14 record. Birmingham Bullets made a brief appearance in the North European Basketball League.

The Manchester Giants franchise, once one of the League's title contenders, were withdrawn from the BBL midway through the season by League officials following ongoing financial difficulties. Prior to withdrawing in December, the Giants had a 2-7 record in the Northern Conference.

Locations of the 2001–02 BBL teams

== Notable occurrences ==
- It was announced on December 7, 2001, that the Manchester Giants franchise had been withdrawn by League officials. The team had a 2-7 record in the Northern Conference before being expelled from the competition due to unfulfilling a fixture and a lack of finance.
- The Southern All-Star's claimed the annual All-Star Game with an emphatic 196-142 victory against the Northern All-Stars at the Telewest Arena. Greater London Leopards' Rico Alderson was named as the game's MVP with 34 points and 15 rebounds. Brighton Bears' Albert White lead the game scoring with 38 points.
- The Birmingham Bullets' regular season home match against Edinburgh Rocks on February 2, 2002, was abandoned due to a waterlogged court. Severe heavy rain and a leak in the Aston Villa Leisure Centre roof caused the main court to flood and the game to be postponed.

== BBL Championship (Tier 1) ==
=== Final standings ===
==== Northern Conference ====
Pos	Team	Pld	W	L	%	Pts
1	Chester Jets	32	24	8	0.750	48
2	Sheffield Sharks	32	21	11	0.656	42
3	Newcastle Eagles	32	17	15	0.531	34
4	Edinburgh Rocks	32	13	19	0.406	26
5	Leicester Riders	32	11	21	0.344	22
6	Derby Storm	32	3	29	0.094	6

==== Southern Conference ====
Pos	Team	Pld	W	L	%	Pts
1	London Towers	32	21	11	0.656	42
2	Brighton Bears	32	21	11	0.656	42
3	Milton Keynes Lions	32	16	16	0.500	32
4	Greater London Leopards	32	16	16	0.500	32
5	Birmingham Bullets	32	15	17	0.469	30
6	Thames Valley Tigers	32	14	18	0.438	28

= Conference winners
= Qualified for the play-offs

=== Playoffs ===
==== 1st Round ====
April 6, 2002

Newcastle Eagles	94–88	Greater London Leopards

SkyDome Arena, Coventry

April 6, 2002

Milton Keynes Lions	69–64	Edinburgh Rocks

SkyDome Arena, Coventry

==== Quarter-finals ====
April 7, 2002

Sheffield Sharks	85–81	Milton Keynes Lions

SkyDome Arena, Coventry

April 7, 2002

Brighton Bears	102–101 (OT)	Newcastle Eagles

SkyDome Arena, Coventry

==== Semi-finals ====
April 14, 2002

London Towers	87–104	Sheffield Sharks

SkyDome Arena, Coventry

April 14, 2002

Chester Jets	95–82	Brighton Bears

SkyDome Arena, Coventry

==== Final ====
April 27, 2002

Report

Chester Jets	93–82	Sheffield Sharks
Scoring by quarter: 20-19, 25-24, 23-18, 25-21
Pts: John McCord (MVP) 31, Pero Cameron 20, John Thomas 19, Calvin Davis 12, James Hamilton 11		Pts: Lynard Stewart, 18, Michael Payne 15, Justin Phoenix 14, Jeff Monaco 13, Nate Reinking 11

Wembley Arena, London

== National League Conference (Tier 2) ==
=== Final standings ===
Pos	Team	Pld	W	L	%	Pts
1	Teesside Mohawks	18	17	1	0.944	34
2	Plymouth Raiders	18	14	4	0.778	28
3	Solent Stars	18	11	7	0.611	22
4	Kingston Wildcats	18	10	8	0.556	20
5	Manchester Magic	18	9	9	0.500	18
6	Worthing Thunder	18	9	9	0.500	18
7	Reading Rockets	18	7	11	0.389	14
8	Inter-Basket London	18	5	13	0.278	10
9	Coventry Crusaders	18	4	14	0.222	8
10	Sutton Pumas	18	4	14	0.222	8

= League winners
= Qualified for the play-offs

Play Off Final – Teesside 127 Solent 117 (OT)

== National League Division 1 (Tier 3) ==
=== Final standings ===
Pos	Team	Pld	W	L	%	Pts
1	Derbyshire Arrows	22	20	2	0.909	40
2	Ealing Tornadoes	22	19	3	0.864	38
3	Ware Fire	22	16	6	0.727	32
4	Oxford Devils	22	16	6	0.727	32
5	Hull Icebergs	22	12	10	0.545	24
6	Westminster Warriors	22	11	11	0.500	22
7	North London Lords	22	7	15	0.318	14
8	NW London Wolverines	22	7	15	0.318	14
9	Worcester Wolves	22	7	15	0.318	14
10	Mansfield Express	22	6	16	0.273	12
11	Cardiff Clippers	22	6	16	0.273	12
12	Liverpool	22	3	19	0.136	6

= League winners
= Qualified for the play-offs

Play Off Final – Derbyshire 83 Ealing 81

== NTL National Cup ==
=== Last 16 ===
Team 1	Team 2	Score
Worthing Thunder	Leicester Riders	89-126
Plymouth Raiders	Birmingham Bullets	75-101
Teesside Mohawks	Newcastle Eagles	101-113
Chester Jets	Brighton Bears	90-74
Edinburgh Rocks	London Towers	86-84
Manchester Giants	Thames Valley Tigers	75-87
Derby Storm	Milton Keynes Lions	70-90
Greater London Leopards	Sheffield Sharks	88-96

=== Quarter-finals ===
Team 1	Team 2	Score
Milton Keynes Lions	Thames Valley Tigers	70-83
Leicester Riders	Sheffield Sharks	76-99
Chester Jets	Newcastle Eagles	92-83
Birmingham Bullets	Edinburgh Rocks	67-66

=== Semi-finals ===
Team 1	Team 2	Score
Chester Jets	Thames Valley Tigers	106-90
Birmingham Bullets	Sheffield Sharks	75-70

=== Final ===
13 January 2002

Chester Jets	112–105	Birmingham Bullets
Pts: Calvin Davis 30, John McCord 26, Pero Cameron 19, James Hamilton 19		Pts: Rashod Johnson 39, Brant Bailey 34, Rob Paternostro 20

Sheffield Arena

== BBL Trophy ==
This season's BBL Trophy featured all 12 BBL teams. The First round saw all 12 teams split into two groups with the top four finishing teams advancing to the knockout stage.

=== Group stage ===
Group A

Team	Pts	Pld	W	L	Percent
1.Chester Jets	10	5	5	0	1.000
2.Brighton Bears	8	5	4	1	0.800
3.Greater London Leopards	6	5	3	2	0.600
4.Thames Valley Tigers	4	5	2	3	0.400
5.Derby Storm	2	5	1	4	0.200
6.Leicester Riders	0	5	0	5	0.000

Group B

Team	Pts	Pld	W	L	Percent
1.Milton Keynes Lions	8	5	4	1	0.800
2.Sheffield Sharks	8	5	4	1	0.800
3.London Towers	6	5	3	2	0.600
4.Newcastle Eagles	6	5	3	2	0.600
5.Birmingham Bullets	2	5	1	4	0.200
6.Edinburgh Rocks	0	5	0	5	0.000

=== Quarter-finals ===
February 3, 2002

Milton Keynes Lions	68–67	Thames Valley Tigers

SkyDome Arena, Coventry

February 3, 2002

Chester Jets	91–87	Newcastle Eagles

SkyDome Arena, Coventry

February 3, 2002

Brighton Bears	83–89	London Towers

SkyDome Arena, Coventry

February 3, 2002

Sheffield Sharks	78–83	Greater London Leopards

SkyDome Arena, Coventry

=== Semi-finals ===
February 23, 2002

Milton Keynes Lions	73–63	London Towers

SkyDome Arena, Coventry

February 23, 2002

Chester Jets	92–81	Greater London Leopards

SkyDome Arena, Coventry

=== Final ===
March 16, 2002

Report

Chester Jets	90–89	Milton Keynes Lions
Scoring by quarter: 27-20, 17-23, 19-26, 27-20
Pts: John Thomas 38, John McCord 19, Pero Cameron 12		Pts: Jermaine Brown 26, Nigel Lloyd 20, Victor Payne 18

National Exhibition Centre, Birmingham

== All-Star Game ==
January 20, 2002

Northern All-Stars	142–196	Southern All-Stars

Telewest Arena, Newcastle upon Tyne

== Statistics leaders ==
Category	Player	Stat
Points per game	(United States) John McCord (Chester Jets)	25.5
Rebounds per game	(Panama) Antonia Garcia (Birmingham Bullets)	14.9
Assists per game	(Barbados) (United Kingdom) Nigel Lloyd (Milton Keynes Lions)	6.8

== Seasonal awards ==
- Most Valuable Player: John Thomas (Chester Jets)
- Coach of the Year: Robbie Peers (Chester Jets)
- Defensive Player of the Year: Brendan Graves (Edinburgh Rocks)
- Most Improved Player: Victor Payne (Milton Keynes Lions)
- Sixth Man Award: Rodger Farrington (Brighton Bears)

Preceded by 2000–01 season	BBL seasons 2001–02	Succeeded by 2002–03 season
