= Gareth Murray =

Scottish basketball player (born 1984)

Prievidza
- Title: Head coach
- League: Extraliga

Personal information
- Born: 23 September 1984 (age 42) Arbroath, Scotland
- Listed height: 6 ft 7 in (2.01 m)

Career information
- NBA draft: 2006: undrafted
- Playing career: 2006–2022
- Position: Small forward / power forward
- Coaching career: 2020–present

Career history

Playing
- 2006–2010: Scottish Rocks / Glasgow Rocks
- 2010–2011: Chester Jets
- 2011–2014: Glasgow Rocks
- 2014: Cheshire Phoenix
- 2014–2015: Vendée Challans
- 2015: Plymouth Raiders
- 2015–2016: Étoile Angers Basket
- 2016–2022: Glasgow Rocks

Coaching
- 2020–2024: Caledonia Gladiators
- 2024–present: BC Prievidza

Gareth Murray (born 23 September 1984) is a Scottish basketball coach and former professional basketball player. He is the current head coach for Prievidza in Slovak Basketball League.

== Early life ==
Murray was born in Arbroath.

== Professional career ==
Murray started his career with the Scottish Rocks in 2006. Murray has also played for fellow British Basketball League clubs Cheshire Phoenix and 2010–11 and 2014–15 as well as Plymouth Raiders also in 2014–15. Murray has also taken his talents over the channel with NM1 clubs Vendee Challans in 2014–15 and Angers BC in 2015–16.

== National team career ==
Murray earned his first call-up to the Great Britain men's national basketball team in 2013. He has since featured in all of Great Britain's major tournaments and qualifying campaigns including FIBA Eurobasket 2013 and FIBA Eurobasket 2017. During that time, Murray has established a reputation as one of the National Team's finest marksmen with a national team career three-point field goal percentage of 0.407 (55/135) as of 24 February 2020.

== Coaching career ==
On 16 July 2020, Murray was announced as the Rocks' player-coach, which later were renamed Caledonia Gladiators. In 2022–23, he guided the team to winning the BBL Trophy. On 5 December 2024, he was hired as head coach of Slovak club BC Prievidza.

== Club statistics ==
=== Career statistics ===
Year	Team	GP	GS	MPG	FG%	3P%	FT%	RPG	APG	SPG	BPG	PPG
2008-09	Scottish Rocks	34	34		41.3	34.3	86.2	4.6	1.7	1.3	0.2	13.8
2009-10	Glasgow Rocks	35	35	32.8	43.1	30.1	72.6	5.1	2	1	0.4	10.9
2010-11	Cheshire Jets	33	33	33.0	43.4	41.5	67.8	4.8	2.2	1.7	0.4	10.8
2011-12	Glasgow Rocks	30	25	34.6	42.2	32	67.9	5.2	2.7	1	0.4	12.9
2012-13	Glasgow Rocks	33	26	32.8	43	35	86'2	6	3.1	1.1	0.3	12.2
2013-14	Glasgow Rocks	33	30	32.9	39.4	32.8	80.6	4.3	3.1	1	0.4	12'6
2014	Vendee Challans											
2014	Cheshire Phoenix	4	3	35.2	37	39.3	100	5.5	2.5	0.5	0.3	11.5
2015	Plymouth Raiders	18	14	34.5	39.9	27.2	80.6	6.3	2.9	1.3	0.4	10.9
2015-16	Angers BC											
2016-17	Glasgow Rocks	28	27	29.9	54.3	42.3	79.5	4.3	2.1	0.7	0.2	12.8
2017-18	Glasgow Rocks	27	27	28.8	45.6	36.2	84.1	3.9	3.1	0.7	0.3	12.5
