= Caledonia Gladiators =

Scottish professional basketball team

- League: SLB
- Established: 1998; 28 years ago
- History: Edinburgh Rocks (1998–2002); Scottish Rocks (2002–2009); Glasgow Rocks (2009–2022); Caledonia Gladiators (2022–present)
- Arena: Playsport Arena
- Capacity: 1,800
- Location: East Kilbride, Scotland
- Team colours: Royal blue, sky blue, white
- CEO: Tony McDaid
- Head coach: Jonny Bunyan
- Ownership: Caledonia Holdings (Steve and Alison Timoney)
- Championships: 1 BBL Playoffs; 1 BBL Trophy
- Website: caledoniagladiators.com
Home	Away

The Caledonia Gladiators are a Scottish professional basketball club based in East Kilbride, South Lanarkshire and are the only Scotland-based team in Super League Basketball, the top tier of domestic basketball in the United Kingdom.

Founded in 1998, the club has previously been based in Edinburgh and Glasgow, before being rebranded as Caledonia Gladiators in 2022, due to a change in ownership and location. Since 2023, the Gladiators have played all home games at the 1,800-seat Playsport Arena.

== History ==
=== Edinburgh Rocks ===
Established as the Edinburgh Rocks in 1998 by a consortium of businessmen, the team debuted at Meadowbank Arena under the helm of American coach Jim Brandon. Rocks were not the first Scottish team to compete in the British Basketball League (BBL), with both Murray Livingston and Glasgow Rangers making successful but short-lived appearances in the top-flight during the late 1980s. The franchise was admitted directly into the top-tier league to fill the slot opened up following the merging of Crystal Palace and London Towers. Despite being led by veteran coach Brandon, the team encountered a tough rookie season, finishing 9th in the 13 team league with a 12–24 record. Though finishing only one place off the play-offs, Rocks were well adrift of 8th-placed Greater London Leopards, with a gap of 7 wins (14 points) between the two teams.

During the club's second season the club effectively went bankrupt before being purchased by one of its existing directors, Ian Reid. Off-court problems did not detract much from the team's performance in the league, and the Rocks bettered their inaugural season with a 19–17 record, finishing 3rd in the Northern Conference and qualifying for the postseason play-offs. They faced previous year's finalists Thames Valley Tigers in the quarter-final, and despite a late rally, Rocks edged out their opponents to a 68–64 win, with American guard Ted Berry posting a team-high 16 points. Advancing to the semi-finals, the Rocks came up against League champions and favourites Manchester Giants and, despite trailing 52–28 at half-time, several scoring runs from the Rocks brought them to within 2 points of the Giants, with 2 minutes left. The Giants held out for an 84–82 victory and advanced to the finals which they eventually won.

Edinburgh's third campaign saw coach Brandon move on and American coach Greg Lockridge take charge, but he was fired after less than two months following a series of bust-ups with players and poor results. Scotland player Iain MacLean stepped up as player-coach but saw the side finish bottom of the Northern Conference, with a dismal 5–31 record and 1st round exits in the National Cup and the Trophy.

=== Scottish Rocks ===
In 2001–02 another American, Kevin Wall, was placed in charge and brought a mild turn in fortunes, finishing 4th (13–19). But it was another switch, in the summer of 2002, which proved more significant. Attracted by the opening of the brand-new 4,000-seat Braehead Arena in Glasgow, Rocks uprooted from their ageing Meadowbank venue in Edinburgh and moved 45-miles west to Scotland's largest city, and rebranded as the Scottish Rocks. The move received a mixed response from fans, whilst many said that the move wouldn't work, the official supporters club backed the franchise's decision.

While few fans followed the club west, the first season in Glasgow provided the franchise with a sponsorship deal with Mitsubishi and its most successful season to date, as coach Wall led the Rocks to their first ever trophy, the BBL Play-off Championship. Finishing 6th in the regular season standings, with a 22–18 record, the Rocks were outside shots at best to claim the Playoff title, but nail-biting victories against Chester Jets in the Quarter-final (94–98) and Sheffield Sharks in the Semi-final (74–76) propelled the Scots into a Final showdown with Brighton Bears at the National Indoor Arena (NIA) in Birmingham. The match was closely fought throughout, but Rocks’ Trinidadian star Shawn Myers put in an MVP performance with 26 points and hoisted the new-look club into the history books with a 76–83 victory.

Returning to the US, Wall's exit saw the arrival of former Brighton assistant Steve Swanson as the new head coach and on the back of the Play-off win, ushered in a new era for the franchise. With a 23–14 record, the Rocks finished the 2003–04 season in 4th place, the franchise's highest place finish in its short history, whilst also reaching the Semi-final of the Trophy and appearing as finalists in the inaugural BBL Cup, losing to Sheffield 70–83 in front of 6,000 people at Birmingham's NIA. The following season wasn't quite as successful during the regular season, but the team did manage to reach the Cup final again, losing out this time to coach Swanson's former team Brighton in a 90–74 defeat.

Sponsorship deals with local Honda dealer Phoenix and national newspaper the Daily Record saw the team named as the Scottish Phoenix Honda Record Rocks for the 2005–06 season and also saw the franchise reach its best ever league placing of second (29–11) and a further second place in the play-off final. Eliminating both Chester and Sheffield convincingly in the Quarter-final and Semi-final respectively, Rocks came up against their traditional arch-rivals Newcastle in the final in Birmingham, and though finishing only one victory (two points) behind the Eagles in the regular season, Rocks were brushed aside in the 83–68 loss. Following the loss, coach Swanson announced his departure, returning to US college basketball, and after three seasons at the club and a 0.614 winning average he left as the coach with the most wins record to date in Rocks' history.

The 2006–07 season saw the arrival of the British league's first ever German coach, Thorsten Leibenath. The German continued Rocks' winning ways, and took the team to another Cup final, losing out once more to Guildford 82–79, whilst a 4th-place finish and another appearance in the final of the play-off saw the seemingly annual rivalry with Eagles revived, Newcastle again triumphed in a 95–82 victory. On 30 April 2007, the Rocks announced Leibenath was leaving the club to take over head coaching duties at his previous club Giessen 46ers in Germany. Player, and BBL veteran Sterling Davis was named as his successor, assuming a player-coach role within the team. Davis' team performed amicably throughout the 2007–08 season, but a first round exit in the Trophy and a 5th-place finish in the league and a Quarter-final exit in the post-season Play-offs to eventual Runners-up Milton Keynes Lions, 105–93, meant the Rocks had failed to appear in a major Final for the first time in six years.

With the costs of Braehead Arena mounting, Rocks were finding difficulty in coming to an agreement with the venue owners over a new deal, forcing them to consider other options. Ultimately, the Rocks agreed a deal with the 1,200-capacity Kelvin Hall International Sports Arena, and although many fans considered it a downgrade, the clubs bosses were satisfied the move was helping the Rocks move forward. The move was announced on 16 July 2008, and would commence immediately, with a future plan to move into the new 6,500-capacity National Indoor Sports Arena in 2011.

The Rocks' first season at their new home would turn out to be a very turbulent one indeed. After an excellent start in the league campaign, they found themselves top of the table in January, however, a series of key injuries and a reported lack of harmony in the roster jeopardised their season. In the end, with an 18–15 record, the Rocks just managed to scrape a 7th-place finish and spot in the Play-offs, but again fell at the first hurdle, losing 84–64 to a dominating Everton Tigers side.

=== Glasgow Rocks ===
Former logo of Glasgow Rocks (2009–2022)

During the summer 2008, the franchise also announced a new long-term agreement with Glasgow City Council. As part of the agreement, the Scottish Rocks would be renamed as the Glasgow Rocks from the start of the 2009–10 season.

In November 2009, it was announced that four Rocks players had caught swine flu, forcing the club to postpone a game with Guildford. All of the players made a full recovery.

The team reached the final of 2009–10 Playoffs, losing 80–72 to the Everton Tigers.

Continuing delays on construction of the new National Indoor Sports Arena meant the postponement of the scheduled move and the Rocks remaining at the Kelvin Hall for the 2011–12 season.

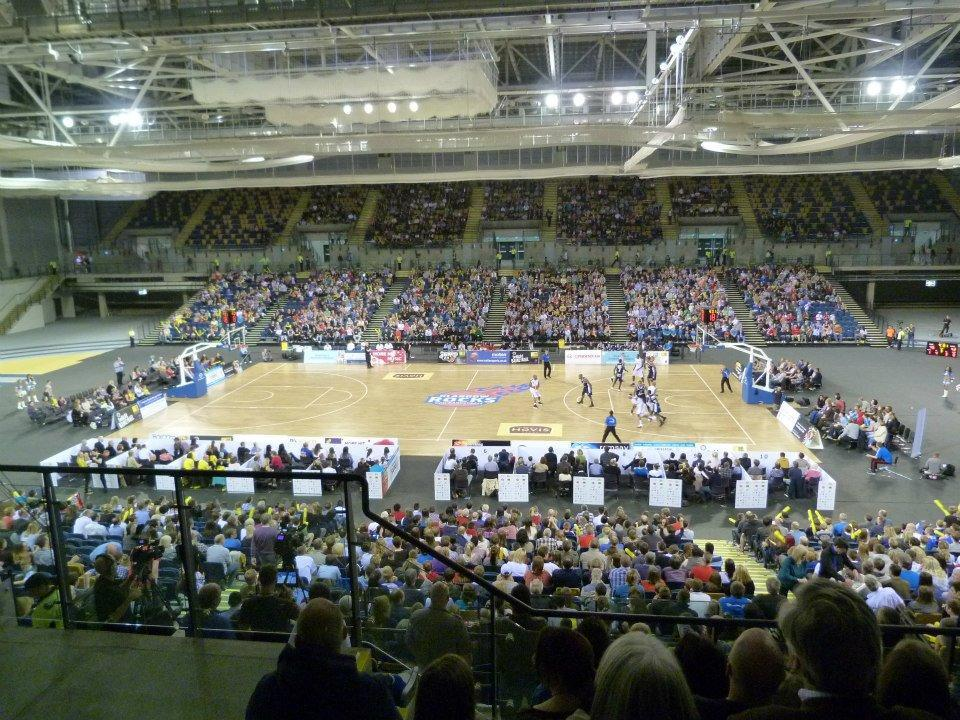
The Rocks' first home game at the Emirates, October 2012

The Rocks moved into their new home at the National Indoor Sports Arena, known as the Emirates Arena for sponsorship reasons, in October 2012. The opening game in the arena was a derby match against Newcastle Eagles in front of a record 5,500 crowd, with the Eagles winning 102–84.

After a disappointing league season, the Rocks reached the 2013–14 BBL Trophy Final, played at the Rocks' own Emirates Arena, where they lost out to the Worcester Wolves, 83–76. Captain EJ Harrison, who was plagued by injury for the second half of the season, also announced his retirement from the game.

The Rocks reached the 2014–15 BBL Cup Final, losing 84–71 to the Newcastle Eagles.

The Rocks set a club record 12-game winning streak during the early stages of the 2016–17 season, which would see the team reach the 2016–17 BBL Cup Final in Birmingham. The team lost out to rivals Newcastle, 91–83. Towards the end of the season, the club announced that the last remaining "original" shareholder of the club, Ian Reid, had sold his 50% share in the club to businessman Duncan Smillie. Following the end of the campaign, it was announced long term head coach Sterling Davis was to leave the club.

The Rocks reached the 2018–19 BBL Cup Final, losing 68–54 to the London Lions.

=== New ownerships and Gladiators rebrand ===
In August 2022, Caledonia Basketball Holdings Ltd, a company owned by Steve and Alison Timoney, purchased 100% of shares in the Glasgow Rocks basketball team. They rebranded the team as Caledonia Gladiators starting from the 2022–23 season.

== Home arenas ==
Meadowbank Arena (1998–2002)
Braehead Arena (2002–2008)
Kelvin Hall International Sports Arena (2008–2012)
Emirates Arena (2012–2023)
Playsport Arena (2023–present)

== Season-by-season records ==
Seasons 1998–2024
Season	Division	Tier	Regular Season						Post-Season	Trophy	Cup	Head coach
Season	Division	Tier	Finish	Played	Wins	Losses	Points	Win %	Post-Season	Trophy	Cup	Head coach
Edinburgh Rocks
1998–99	BBL	1	9th	36	12	24	24	0.333	Did not qualify	1st round (BT)	1st round (NC)	Jim Brandon
1999–00	BBL N	1	3rd	36	19	17	38	0.528	Semi-finals	1st round (BT)	Semi-finals (NC)	Jim Brandon
2000–01	BBL N	1	7th	36	5	31	10	0.139	Did not qualify	1st round (BT)	1st round (NC)	Greg Lockridge; Iain MacLean
2001–02	BBL N	1	4th	32	13	19	26	0.406	Quarter-finals	1st round (BT)	Quarter-finals (NC)	Kevin Wall
Scottish Rocks
2002–03	BBL	1	6th	40	22	18	44	0.550	Winners, beating Brighton	1st round (BT)	1st round (NC)	Kevin Wall
2003–04	BBL	1	4th	36	23	13	46	0.639	Quarter-finals	Semi-finals (BT)	Runners-up (BC)	Steve Swanson
2004–05	BBL	1	6th	40	19	21	38	0.475	Semi-finals	1st round (BT)	Runners-up (BC)	Steve Swanson
2005–06	BBL	1	2nd	40	29	11	58	0.725	Runners-up	Semi-finals (BT)	Semi-finals (BC)	Steve Swanson
2006–07	BBL	1	4th	36	22	14	44	0.611	Runners-up	1st round (BT)	Runners-up (BC)	Thorsten Leibenath
2007–08	BBL	1	5th	33	18	15	36	0.545	Quarter-finals	1st round (BT)	Semi-finals (BC)	Sterling Davis
2008–09	BBL	1	7th	33	16	17	32	0.485	Quarter-finals	1st round (BT)	1st round (BC)	Sterling Davis
Glasgow Rocks
2009–10	BBL	1	3rd	36	23	13	46	0.639	Runners-up	Quarter-finals (BT)	1st round (BC)	Sterling Davis
2010–11	BBL	1	6th	33	18	15	36	0.545	Quarter-finals	1st round (BT)	Quarter-finals (BC)	Sterling Davis
2011–12	BBL	1	5th	30	16	14	32	0.533	Semi-finals	1st round (BT)	Quarter-finals (BC)	Sterling Davis
2012–13	BBL	1	3rd	33	21	12	42	0.636	Quarter-finals	Quarter-finals (BT)	Quarter-finals (BC)	Sterling Davis
2013–14	BBL	1	10th	33	13	20	26	0.394	Did not qualify	Runners-up (BT)	Quarter-finals (BC)	Sterling Davis
2014–15	BBL	1	5th	36	21	15	42	0.583	Quarter-finals	Quarter-finals (BT)	Runners-up (BC)	Sterling Davis
2015–16	BBL	1	5th	33	19	14	38	0.576	Semi-finals	Quarter-final (BT)	Quarter-final (BC)	Sterling Davis
2016–17	BBL	1	3rd	33	21	12	42	0.636	Quarter-finals	1st round (BT)	Runners-up (BC)	Sterling Davis
2017–18	BBL	1	4th	33	21	12	42	0.636	Semi-finals	1st round (BT)	Quarter-finals (BC)	Tony Garbelotto; Darryl Wood
2018–19	BBL	1	5th	33	18	15	36	0.545	Quarter-finals	Semi-finals (BT)	Runners-up (BC)	Darryl Wood; Vincent Lavandier
2019–20	BBL	1	Season cancelled due to COVID-19 pandemic							Quarter-finals (BT)	Pool Stage (BC)	Vincent Lavandier
2020–21	BBL	1	11th	30	4	26	8	0.133	Did not qualify	Semi-finals (BT)	Quarter-finals (BC)	Gareth Murray
2021–22	BBL	1	7th	27	12	15	24	0.444	Semi-finals	Semi-finals (BT)	Semi-finals (BC)	Gareth Murray
Caledonia Gladiators
2022–23	BBL	1	4th	36	19	17	38	0.528	Quarter-finals	Winners, beating Cheshire (BT)	Semi-finals (BC)	Gareth Murray
2023–24	BBL	1	3rd	36	23	13	46	0.639	Quarter-finals	Semi-finals (BT)		Gareth Murray

=== SLB season-by-season ===
Champions	SLB champions	Runners-up	Playoff berth

Season	Tier	League	Regular season					Postseason	Cup	Trophy	Head coach
Season	Tier	League	Finish	Played	Wins	Losses	Win %	Postseason	Cup	Trophy	Head coach
Caledonia Gladiators
2024–25	1	SLB	9th	32	7	25	.219	Did not qualify	Quarterfinals	Did not qualify	Jonny Bunyan
2025–26	1	SLB	9th	32	7	25	.219	Did not qualify	Did not qualify	Did not qualify	Jonny Bunyan
Championship record				64	14	50	.219	0 championships			
Playoff record				0	0	0	–	0 playoff championships			

== Silverware ==
=== Playoffs ===
- BBL Playoffs Winners: 2002–03

=== Trophy ===
- BBL Trophy Winners: 2022–23

== Players ==
=== Current roster ===
Note: Flags indicate national team eligibility at FIBA-sanctioned events. Players may hold other non-FIBA nationalities not displayed.

Caledonia Gladiators roster
Players
Coaches

Pos.	No.	Nat.	Name	Ht.	Wt.	Age
G	0	(United States)	Ramsey, Devearl	1.83 m (6 ft 0 in)	84 kg (185 lb)	29 – 17 May 1997
F	3	(United States)	Barnes, Trevond	2.05 m (6 ft 9 in)	98 kg (216 lb)	29 – 29 July 1997
F	4	(Scotland)	Stevenson, Lewis	1.95 m (6 ft 5 in)	78 kg (172 lb)
G	5	(Scotland)	Adair, Jamie	1.91 m (6 ft 3 in)	89 kg (196 lb)	19 – 5 May 2007
F	7	(Scotland)	Malcolm, Fraser	1.98 m (6 ft 6 in)	95 kg (209 lb)	30 – 23 May 1996
F	10	(United States) (Nigeria)	Onwas, Princeton	1.98 m (6 ft 6 in)	105 kg (231 lb)	33 – 10 September 1993
F	11	(England)	Fagbenle, Totonitoluwa	2.05 m (6 ft 9 in)	98 kg (216 lb)	25 – 27 May 2001
G	12	(England) (Ireland)	Whelan, Patrick	1.95 m (6 ft 5 in)	96 kg (212 lb)	30 – 25 August 1996
G	14	(Spain)	Ventura, Albert	1.92 m (6 ft 4 in)	91 kg (201 lb)	34 – 7 April 1992
G	19	(Scotland)	Sweeney, Cael	1.82 m (6 ft 0 in)	85 kg (187 lb)	19 – 22 April 2007
F	24	(United States)	Speelman, Jett	2.01 m (6 ft 7 in)	109 kg (240 lb)	32 – 8 July 1994
C	25	(Bosnia and Herzegovina) (England)	Alihodzic, Fahro	2.08 m (6 ft 10 in)	113 kg (249 lb)	37 – 25 August 1989
C	32	(England)	Hughes, Theodore	2.13 m (7 ft 0 in)	119 kg (262 lb)	25 – 9 July 2001

Head coach

- (United Kingdom) Jonny Bunyan

Legend

- (C) Team captain
- Injured

=== Notable former players ===
Note: Flags indicate national team eligibility at FIBA-sanctioned events. Players may hold other non-FIBA nationalities not displayed.

Criteria

To appear in this section a player must have either:

- Set a club record or won an individual award while at the club
- Played at least one official international match for their national team at any time
- Played at least one official NBA match at any time.

- (United Kingdom) (Scotland) Kieron Achara
- (United States) (United Kingdom) Sterling Davis
- (United States) Niki Arinze
- (United States) Ted Berry
- (Iceland) Jónatan James Bow
- (United States) Mike Copeland
- (Sudan) (United Kingdom) Ajou Deng
- (United Kingdom) (England) Julius Joseph
- (United States) (Greece) Nicholas Livas
- (United States) (United Kingdom) John McCord
- (United Kingdom) (Scotland) Iain MacLean
- (United Kingdom) (England) Mike Martin
- (United States) Jessie Sapp
- (United States) (United Kingdom) Billy Singleton
- (United States) Charles Smith
- (United States) Jerry Williams
- (United States) (United Kingdom) Tony Windless
- (United States) (United Kingdom) Robert Yanders
- (United Kingdom) (Scotland) Graham Hunter
- (Saint Kitts and Nevis) (United Kingdom) Bantu Burroughs
- (United Kingdom) (Scotland) Scott Russell
- (Netherlands) Julius van Sauers

=== Retired numbers ===
No.	Nat.	Player	Tenure
13	(United Kingdom) (Scotland)	Iain MacLean	1998–2001
5	(United States)	Ted Berry	1998–2003
4	(United States) (United Kingdom)	Sterling Davis	2006–2015
20	(United Kingdom) (Scotland)	Kieron Achara	2014–2019
33	(United Kingdom) (Scotland)	Gareth Murray	2005–2022

== Caledonia Blues ==
In 2025, the Gladiators announced the launch of a new development team, Caledonia Blues, to support younger players under 23 years old to train and play, and integrate and play with the Gladiators’ first teams.

== Scottish Rockettes ==
The Scottish Rockettes were the official dance team of the Glasgow Rocks. Amongst other events they also perform at BBL competition finals and home games for Glasgow Rugby.

The dance team was made up of 21 women who are all over 18 years of age from backgrounds as diverse as IT, nursing, finance, dance and sales. Each year the dance team train in the USA alongside the NBA and NFL dancers, learning material from the world's best choreographers.

Once the Caledonia Gladiators took over the Glasgow Rocks in 2022 the Rockettes were ended.

== See also ==
- Caledonia Gladiators (women)
- British Basketball League
- Scottish Basketball League
