= BBL Trophy =

British basketball competition

- Organising body: British Basketball League
- Founded: 1987
- First season: 1987–88
- Folded: 2023–24
- Country: Great Britain
- Confederation: FIBA Europe
- Number of teams: 10
- Last champions: Cheshire Phoenix (6th title) (2023–24)
- Most championships: Newcastle Eagles (7 titles)
- 2023–24 BBL Trophy

The British Basketball League Trophy, often shortened to the BBL Trophy, is an annual cup competition for the British Basketball League (BBL). It is the unique of peripheral competitions operated by the League during the regular season, The competition's structure and format vary from season to season and, unlike the BBL Cup, often includes invited clubs from the English Basketball League and the Scottish Basketball League, and representatives from Basketball Wales, a novelty in BBL events which gives the competition much of its character.

The most recent champions are the Cheshire Phoenix who defeated London Lions at Arena Birmingham.

== History ==
The BBL Trophy can trace its origins back to a previous competition known as the Anglo-Scottish Cup which was founded in 1984. The Anglo-Scottish Cup featured teams from the English National Basketball League and the National League of Scotland, and was first won by Scottish team Livingston in 1985. The competition was renamed as the British Masters Cup for the following season and though the initial group stage was played early in the regular season, the knock-out stages were now played during the post-season, almost simultaneously with the Play-offs. Birmingham Bullets emerged as the competition's second winners, and the first from England, whilst emerging powerhouse Kingston won the 1987 edition.

Following the launch of the new British Basketball League administration in 1987 – taking over control of the National Basketball League from the English Basketball Association – the British Masters Cup was scrapped and replaced with the newly formed League Trophy. The new competition, sponsored by NatWest and christened as the NatWest Trophy, featured only the 15 member teams of Carlsberg League, including new Scottish entrant and former Anglo-Scottish Cup winner, Livingston. The first round of the new tournament divided the 15 teams into regional groups, with each group winner progressing to the Semi-final stage. Calderdale Explorers and Livingston progressed from the two Northern groups, whilst Kingston and Portsmouth advanced in the Southern groups. In the Semi-finals the two Northern area teams competed against each other, as did the two Southern teams, to ensure the Final would feature a North versus South match-up. The Semi-finals were played as a two-game series, with the winner decided by the biggest aggregate score. Portsmouth advanced in the Southern encounter with Kingston, winning 168–167 on aggregate, whilst Livingston beat Calderdale 158–142 on aggregate from the North. The first Final was played at the Aston Villa Leisure Centre, where Livingston continued their success from the British Masters Cup by beating Portsmouth 96–91 to become the first and so far only Scottish winners.

Due to a decline in members for the second edition, an even 12 teams were divided into two regionalised groups for the first round with the top four teams (from six) advancing through to a Quarter-final stage which also used the two-game aggregate scoring system. Bracknell Tigers stamped their dominance in the opening rounds, topping the Southern group before defeating Trophy holders Livingston 89–81 in the Final. From the 1989–90 season the Trophy continued with a North and South group format for the opening round, although due to a lack of members in the League the Quarter-finals were axed and the top two teams advanced to the two-game Semi-final series. The Final had switched venues to the larger Royal Albert Hall in London, and both the 1990 and 1991 editions saw Kingston defeat the Manchester Giants two years in a row. The 1991–92 season saw a third group introduced and 10 teams divided into Northern, Midlands and Southern regions as the holders Kingston received a bye to the Semi-final stage and a match-up with London Towers, whilst Manchester (winners of the North) were pitted against Leicester City Riders (winners of the Midlands area) in the other Semi-final. Kingston claimed their third Trophy win in three seasons with a 71–68 victory over Leicester at the National Exhibition Centre as the Final returned to a Birmingham venue after its two-year stint in London.

The group stage returned to the original format of two Northern and two Southern groups from 1992 due to an increase in teams competing in the Carlsberg League. Thames Valley Tigers' 91–84 victory in the 1993 Final against Guildford Kings (who were the former Kingston team in new guise) brought an end to the successful Kingston dynasty and started a new period of dominance as the Tigers went on to win two more Trophy finals in succession. The 1995–96 season brought about another format changed to the competition that was now known as the 7 Up Trophy through sponsorship from the 7 Up beverage brand. The first round reverted to a single North and a single South group format whilst there was also the return of the Quarter-finals round which was still played as a two-game series. Due to the uneven number of teams competing in the group stage, several teams received byes into the Quarter-final stage. This format remained consistent for the next three seasons, in a period that saw Southern domination in the Trophy from the London Towers franchise as they reach three consecutive Finals, winning in 1996 and 1997 and finishing as Runners-up in 1998.

A change in sponsorship saw the competition rebranded as the uni-ball Trophy in 1997 after a naming rights agreement was made with the Mitsubishi Pencil Company. Further changes were introduced in 1998, as for the first time the Trophy's first round group stage was not based on geographical region and instead were drawn at random whilst the Quarter-final stage became a single-game round. The 1999–2000 season saw 16 teams participate in the first round making it the largest edition of the Trophy competition to date. All 13 BBL teams entered the First round along with three invitees from the National Basketball League – Plymouth Raiders, Solent Stars and Sutton Pumas. This edition also saw the abolition of the two-game series as the Semi-finals also reverted to a single match event. After eight seasons, the venue for the Trophy Final was moved across town from its usual home at the National Exhibition Centre to the National Indoor Arena in Birmingham's city centre.

Chester Jets' 92–81 win over Newcastle Eagles in the 2001 Final saw a third dynastic era of dominance in the Trophy's history as the Cheshire-based team went on to claim three more Trophy crowns in the following three seasons. During this period, the competition had now become the BBL Trophy after its sponsorship contract for the naming rights was not renewed with uni-ball, whilst the venue for the Final had moved to Sheffield and the Hallam FM Arena. The competition had reverted its First round format back to regionalised groups from 2002, as the BBL merged the North and South Conferences in its regular season back to one Championship. The regionalised groups remained unchanged until 2007.

For the 2006–07 season special invitees from the English Basketball League entered into the competition. These teams were Coventry Crusaders, London Leopards, Reading Rockets and Worthing Thunder. For the first time the BBL also welcomed the top two teams from the Scottish Basketball League, Troon Tornadoes and Edinburgh Kings into the competition which brought the total number of entrants to 16. Having won all four BBL competitions during the 2005–06 campaign, Newcastle Eagles were widely tipped to win the Trophy again in 2007, especially as their home venue – the Metro Radio Arena – was hosting the Final. However it was underdogs Plymouth Raiders who took home their first BBL silverware with a 74–65 victory in the Final, in front of a crowd of over 5,000 people.

Guildford Heat won the 2008 Trophy Final at Plymouth's Pavilions arena as Newcastle again finished as Runners-up, but in an identical match-up in the 2009 Final, Eagles beat Guildford 83–71 at their own home venue, the Spectrum. This season also saw the return of the two-game series for the Semi-finals stage whilst the 2009–10 edition saw the removal of the group stage for the First round in favour of a straight knock-out tournament with 16 teams entered, including London Leopards, Manchester Magic and Reading Rockets from the English Basketball League. The Trophy Final was again played at the Spectrum for the 2010 Final where Newcastle were again victorious over the Cheshire Jets.

For the first time since 2001, the Trophy received corporate sponsorship through a naming rights agreement with clothing brand Franklin & Marshall for the 2010–11 season. The Franklin & Marshall Trophy Final was held at the O2 Arena in London as part of the NBA's "Basketball Week" and saw Mersey Tigers pick-up their first Trophy with an 84–66 victory over Guildford. For the 2011–12 season, the competition had received another major change to its format with the Trophy Final organised as a two-game series and the winner decided by an aggregate scoring system, making it the first time that the Final was not played as a single-game event. Newcastle and Plymouth competed for the Trophy over two games, with Plymouth winning their home fixture 97–88, but Newcastle's 96–80 victory at their Sport Central venue meant that the Eagles had won with an aggregate score of 184–177. By winning their fifth BBL Trophy, Newcastle Eagles are currently the most successful club in the competition, overshadowing Chester Jets' total of four Trophy's, won from 2001 to 2004.

The 2012–13 season saw the competition operate as a straight knock-out contest as it did for the 2009–10 season. Four invitees – Edinburgh Kings, Essex Leopards, Reading Rockets and Worthing Thunder – were brought in from the EBL to bring the number of entrants to 16. Thunder made history and became the first ever non-BBL team to progress past the 1st Round of the competition after an 84–64 win at home to Mersey Tigers on 6 January 2013. Sheffield Sharks claimed their second Trophy title with a 2-point win over Leicester in the Final at Glasgow's Emirates Arena.

Glasgow's Emirates Arena hosted a second successive final in 2014, but Glasgow Rocks who were appearing in their first Trophy Final were not able to use their home court to their advantage as Worcester Wolves' convincing 83–76 victory in front of 5,000 people earned them their first ever BBL silverware.

== Format ==
The Trophy competition has historically had a round-robin group stage format used for the first round; however, the current competition is a knockout tournament with pairings drawn completely at random – there are no seeds, and a draw takes place after the majority of fixtures have been played in each round. As well as including all BBL member clubs, invited teams from the English Basketball League, and occasionally the Scottish Basketball League, often take part in the Trophy. The Final is usually played in March at a neutral venue.

== Sponsorship ==
Throughout its history the competition has been sponsored by several businesses, which have resulted in the trophy being renamed in accordance with the sponsor's branding.

Period	Sponsor	Name
1987–1993	NatWest	NatWest Trophy
1993–1994	No main sponsor	League Trophy
1994–1997	7 Up	7 Up Trophy
1997–2001	Mitsubishi Pencil Company	uni-ball Trophy
2001–2010	No main sponsor	BBL Trophy
2010–2011	Franklin & Marshall	Franklin & Marshall Trophy
2011–present	No main sponsor	BBL Trophy

== Finals ==
Season	Winner	Score	Runners-up	Venue	Location	MVP
1987–88	Livingston	96–91	Portsmouth	Aston Villa Leisure Centre	Birmingham	unknown
1988–89	Bracknell Tigers	89–81	Livingston	Aston Villa Leisure Centre	Birmingham	unknown
1989–90	Kingston	86–77	Manchester Giants	Royal Albert Hall	London	unknown
1990–91	Kingston	69–59	Manchester Giants	Royal Albert Hall	London	unknown
1991–92	Kingston	71–68	Leicester City Riders	National Exhibition Centre	Birmingham	unknown
1992–93	Thames Valley Tigers	91–84	Guildford Kings	National Indoor Arena	Birmingham	(United States) Lester James
1993–94	Thames Valley Tigers	79–73	Manchester Giants	National Indoor Arena	Birmingham	unknown
1994–95	Thames Valley Tigers	74–69	Sheffield Sharks	National Exhibition Centre	Birmingham	unknown
1995–96	London Towers	90–84	Worthing Bears	National Exhibition Centre	Birmingham	(United States) Tony Windless
1996–97	London Towers	67–59	Chester Jets	National Exhibition Centre	Birmingham	(United Kingdom) Karl Brown
1997–98	Sheffield Sharks	82–79	London Towers	National Exhibition Centre	Birmingham	(United Kingdom) John Amaechi
1998–99	Manchester Giants	90–69	Derby Storm	National Exhibition Centre	Birmingham	(United Kingdom) Ronnie Baker
1999–00	London Towers	74–73	Manchester Giants	National Indoor Arena	Birmingham	(United States) Danny Lewis
2000–01	Chester Jets	92–81	Newcastle Eagles	National Indoor Arena	Birmingham	(New Zealand) Pero Cameron
2001–02	Chester Jets	90–89	Milton Keynes Lions	National Exhibition Centre	Birmingham	(United States) John Thomas
2002–03	Chester Jets	84–82	London Towers	Hallam FM Arena	Sheffield	(United States) (United Kingdom) Todd Cauthorn
2003–04	Chester Jets	68–66	Brighton Bears	Hallam FM Arena	Sheffield	(United States) (United Kingdom) John McCord
2004–05	Newcastle Eagles	85–60	Brighton Bears	Brighton Centre	Brighton	(United States) Charles Smith
2005–06	Newcastle Eagles	71–50	Leicester Riders	SkyDome Arena	Coventry	(United Kingdom) Andrew Sullivan
2006–07	Plymouth Raiders	74–65	Newcastle Eagles	Metro Radio Arena	Newcastle upon Tyne	(United States) Carlton Aaron
2007–08	Guildford Heat	86–79	Newcastle Eagles	Plymouth Pavilions	Plymouth	(United States) E.J. Harrison
2008–09	Newcastle Eagles	83–71	Guildford Heat	Guildford Spectrum	Guildford	(United States) Trey Moore
2009–10	Newcastle Eagles	115–95	Cheshire Jets	Guildford Spectrum	Guildford	(United States) (United Kingdom) Charles Smith
2010–11	Mersey Tigers	84–66	Guildford Heat	O2 Arena	London	(United Kingdom) Andrew Sullivan
2011–12	Newcastle Eagles	184–177 (97–88, 96–80)	Plymouth Raiders	Plymouth Pavilions	Plymouth	not awarded
2011–12	Newcastle Eagles	184–177 (97–88, 96–80)	Plymouth Raiders	Sport Central	Newcastle upon Tyne	not awarded
2012–13	Sheffield Sharks	71–69	Leicester Riders	Emirates Arena	Glasgow	(United States) B.J. Holmes
2013–14	Worcester Wolves	83–76	Glasgow Rocks	Emirates Arena	Glasgow	(Canada) (United Kingdom) Jamal Williams
2014–15	Newcastle Eagles	96–90	Leicester Riders	Emirates Arena	Glasgow	(United States) (United Kingdom) Charles Smith
2015–16	Leicester Riders	85–77	Newcastle Eagles	Emirates Arena	Glasgow	(United Kingdom) Andrew Sullivan
2016–17	Leicester Riders	91–58	Plymouth Raiders	Emirates Arena	Glasgow	(United States) Taylor King
2017–18	Leicester Riders	90–85	Sheffield Sharks	Emirates Arena	Glasgow	(United States) J.R. Holder
2018–19	London City Royals	90–82 (OT)	London Lions	Emirates Arena	Glasgow	(United Kingdom) Ashley Hamilton
2019–20	Newcastle Eagles	96–94 (OT)	Solent Kestrels	Emirates Arena	Glasgow	(United States) CJ Gettys
2020–21	London Lions	88–82	Plymouth Raiders	Worcester Arena	Worcester	(United States) DeAndre Liggins
2021–22	Cheshire Phoenix	82–68	London Lions	Emirates Arena	Glasgow	(United States) Larry Austin Jr.
2022–23	Caledonia Gladiators	73–70	Cheshire Phoenix	Emirates Arena	Glasgow	(United States) Jeremiah Bailey
2023–24	Cheshire Phoenix	98–82	London Lions	Arena Birmingham	Birmingham	(United States) Laquincy Rideau

== Results by team ==
Results by team
Team	Wins	Last final won	Runners-up	Last final lost	Total final appearances
Newcastle Eagles	7	2020	4	2016	11
Cheshire Phoenix	6	2024	3	2023	9
Thames Valley Tigers	4	1995	0	–	4
London Towers	3	2000	2	2003	5
Guildford Kings	3	1992	1	1993	4
Leicester Riders	3	2018	4	2015	7
Sheffield Sharks	2	2013	2	2018	4
London Lions	1	2021	4	2024	5
Manchester Giants	1	1999	4	2000	5
Surrey Scorchers	1	2008	2	2011	3
Plymouth Raiders	1	2007	2	2017	3
Caledonia Gladiators	1	2023	1	2014	2
Livingston	1	1988	1	1989	2
London City Royals	1	2019	0	–	1
Worcester Wolves	1	2014	0	–	1
Mersey Tigers	1	2011	0	–	1
Brighton Bears	0	–	3	2005	3
Derby Storm	0	–	1	1999	1
Portsmouth	0	–	1	1988	1

== See also ==
- Basketball in England
- British Basketball League
- BBL Cup
