= 2003–04 British Basketball League season =

2003–04 BBL season
- League: British Basketball League
- Sport: Basketball

Roll of Honour
- BBL champions: Brighton Bears
- Play Off's champions: Sheffield Sharks
- BBL Cup champions: Sheffield Sharks
- BBL Trophy champions: Chester Jets

British Basketball League seasons
- ← 2002–03 2004–05 →

The 2003–04 BBL season was the 17th campaign in the history of the British Basketball League.

== Teams ==
Locations of the 2003–04 BBL teams

Team	City/Area	Arena	Capacity	Last season
Birmingham Bullets	Birmingham	Birmingham Sports Centre	1,000	9th
Brighton Bears	Brighton	Brighton Centre & Burgess Hill Triangle	3,600; 1,800	2nd
Chester Jets	Chester	Northgate Arena	1,000	3rd
Leicester Riders	Loughborough	Loughborough University	1,200	11th
London Towers	London	Crystal Palace National Sports Centre	3,500	7th
Milton Keynes Lions	Milton Keynes	Bletchley Centre	800	8th
Newcastle Eagles	Newcastle upon Tyne	Telewest Arena	6,500	5th
Scottish Rocks	Glasgow	Braehead Arena	4,000	6th
Sheffield Sharks	Sheffield	Hallam FM Arena & Ponds Forge	8,500; 1,600	1st
Thames Valley Tigers	Bracknell	John Nike Sports Centre	1,000	4th

== Notable occurrences ==
- Due to uncertainty regarding the future of Aston Events Centre, the Birmingham Bullets were forced to relocate to a new home venue. Their first games of the campaign were postponed until a suitable venue could be found, with the owner Craig Bown eventually acquiring the use of Birmingham Sports Centre for the duration of the season.
- With their 68–66 win in the BBL Trophy Final against Brighton Bears, Chester Jets made history as the first team to win the Trophy for four consecutive seasons.

== BBL championship (Tier 1) ==
=== Final standings ===
Pos	Team	Pld	W	L	%	Pts
1	Brighton Bears	36	30	6	0.833	60
2	Sheffield Sharks	36	26	10	0.722	52
3	London Towers	36	23	13	0.638	46
4	Scottish Rocks	36	23	13	0.638	46
5	Chester Jets	36	21	15	0.583	42
6	Newcastle Eagles	36	18	18	0.500	36
7	Thames Valley Tigers	36	18	18	0.500	36
8	Milton Keynes Lions	36	13	23	0.362	26
9	Leicester Riders	36	5	31	0.138	10
10	Birmingham Bullets	36	2	34	0.055	4

= League winners
= Qualified for the play-offs

=== Playoffs ===
Quarter-finals
1	Brighton Bears	91
8	Milton Keynes Lions	83
4	Scottish Rocks	83
5	Chester Jets	86
2	Sheffield Sharks	118
7	Thames Valley Tigers	110
3	London Towers	96
6	Newcastle Eagles	94

Semi-finals
1	Brighton Bears	79
5	Chester Jets	80
2	Sheffield Sharks	94
3	London Towers	88

Final
5	Chester Jets	74
2	Sheffield Sharks	86

==== Quarter-finals ====
17 April 2004

Brighton Bears	91–83	Milton Keynes Lions

Brighton Centre, Brighton

17 April 2004

London Towers	94–92	Newcastle Eagles

Crystal Palace National Sports Centre, London

18 April 2004

Scottish Rocks	83–86	Chester Jets

Braehead Arena, Glasgow

18 April 2004

Sheffield Sharks	118–100	Thames Valley Tigers

Hallam FM Arena, Sheffield

==== Semi-finals ====
1 May 2004

Brighton Bears	79–80	Chester Jets

National Indoor Arena, Birmingham

1 May 2004

Sheffield Sharks	94–88	London Towers

National Indoor Arena, Birmingham

==== Final ====
2 May 2004
6.00 pm GMT

Report

Sheffield Sharks	86–74	Chester Jets
Scoring by quarter: 18–19, 26–19, 16–17, 26–19
Pts: Lynard Stewart 25, Rob Yanders 19, Justin Phoenix 12, Nate Reinking 12		Pts: Michael Nurse 21, John McCord 18, Calvin Davis 14

National Indoor Arena, Birmingham

== EBL National League Division 1 (Tier 2) ==
=== Final standings ===
Pos	Team	Pld	W	L	%	Pts
1	Plymouth Raiders	22	20	2	0.909	40
2	Reading Rockets	22	17	5	0.773	34
3	Teesside Mohawks	22	16	6	0.727	32
4	Manchester Magic	22	16	6	0.727	32
5	Worthing Thunder	22	15	7	0.682	30
6	London United	22	11	11	0.500	22
7	City of Sheffield Arrows	22	10	12	0.455	20
8	Ware Rebels	22	9	13	0.409	18
9	Sutton Pumas	22	7	15	0.318	14
10	Solent Stars	22	4	18	0.182	8
11	Kingston Wildcats	22	4	18	0.182	8
12	Bath Romans	22	3	19	0.136	6

= League winners
= Qualified for the play-offs

== Haribo Cup ==
This season saw the first edition of the newly created Haribo Cup. Following the BBL's decision to withdraw from the National Cup due to import player regulations, the League's newest competition saw all 10 teams competing in a knock-out style tournament culminating in the Grand Final at the National Indoor Arena in Birmingham.

Quarter-finals
Leicester Riders	100
London Towers	112
Milton Keynes Lions	74
Sheffield Sharks	85
Birmingham Bullets	96
Thames Valley Tigers	105
Scottish Rocks	86 (OT)
Newcastle Eagles	82

Semi-finals
London Towers	81
Sheffield Sharks	90
Thames Valley Tigers	104
Scottish Rocks	105 (OT)

Final
Sheffield Sharks	83
Scottish Rocks	70

=== First round ===
26 October 2003

Sheffield Sharks	83–70	Brighton Bears

Hallam FM Arena, Sheffield

26 October 2003

Chester Jets	79–95	Newcastle Eagles

Northgate Arena, Chester

=== Quarter-finals ===
8 November 2003

Leicester Riders	100–112	London Towers

Loughborough University, Loughborough

8 November 2003

Birmingham Bullets	96–105	Thames Valley Tigers

Birmingham Sports Centre, Birmingham

9 November 2003

Milton Keynes Lions	74–85	Sheffield Sharks

Bletchley Centre, Milton Keynes Lions

9 November 2003

Scottish Rocks	86–82 (OT)	Newcastle Eagles

Braehead Arena, Glasgow

=== Semi-finals ===
29 November 2003

London Towers	81–90	Sheffield Sharks

Crystal Palace National Sports Centre, London

29 November 2003

Thames Valley Tigers	104–105 (OT)	Scottish Rocks

Crystal Palace National Sports Centre, London

=== Final ===
11 January 2004

Report

Sheffield Sharks	83–70	Scottish Rocks
Scoring by quarter: 24–14, 22–22, 18–28, 19–6
Pts: H.L. Coleman 22, Lynard Stewart 17, Nate Reinking 13		Pts: Jerry Williams 26, Terence McGee 15, Michael Martin 12

National Indoor Arena, Birmingham

== BBL Trophy ==
Due to the lack of teams competing in this season's Championship, the BBL Trophy featured all 10 BBL teams plus two invited teams from the English Basketball League (Plymouth Raiders and Teesside Mohawks). The First round saw all 12 teams divided into four regionalised groups with the top finishing team advancing to the Semi-finals.

=== Group stage ===
Northern Group 1

Team	Pts	Pld	W	L	Percent
1.Scottish Rocks	8	4	4	0	1.000
2.Newcastle Eagles	4	4	2	2	0.500
3.Teesside Mohawks	0	4	0	4	0.000

Southern Group 1

Team	Pts	Pld	W	L	Percent
1.London Towers	6	4	3	1	0.750
2.Milton Keynes Lions	6	4	3	1	0.750
3.Birmingham Bullets	0	4	0	4	0.000

Northern Group 2

Team	Pts	Pld	W	L	Percent
1.Chester Jets	6	4	3	1	0.750
2.Sheffield Sharks	6	4	3	1	0.750
3.Leicester Riders	0	4	0	4	0.000

Southern Group 2

Team	Pts	Pld	W	L	Percent
1.Brighton Bears	8	4	4	0	1.000
2.Thames Valley Tigers	4	4	2	2	0.500
3.Plymouth Raiders	0	4	0	4	0.000

=== Semi-finals ===
7 February 2004

Brighton Bears	86–73	London Towers

Ponds Forge, Sheffield

7 February 2004

Chester Jets	91–85	Scottish Rocks

Ponds Forge, Sheffield

=== Final ===
13 March 2004

Report

Brighton Bears	66–68	Chester Jets
Scoring by quarter: 21–21, 17–17, 17–15, 11–15
Pts: Kendrick Warren 17, Mike Brown 14, Rico Alderson 12		Pts: John McCord 19 (MVP), Michael Nurse 13, Billy Singleton 11

Hallam FM Arena, Sheffield
Attendance: 5,000

== Statistics leaders ==
Category	Player	Stat
Points per game	(United States) Mike Pegues (Leicester Riders)	24.7
Rebounds per game	(United States) Shawn Jamison (Milton Keynes Lions)	11.6
Assists per game	(United States) (Italy) Rob Paternostro (Birmingham Bullets)	7.8

Preceded by 2002–03 season	BBL seasons 2003–04	Succeeded by 2004–05 season
