= Playsport Arena =

Indoor arena in East Kilbride, Scotland

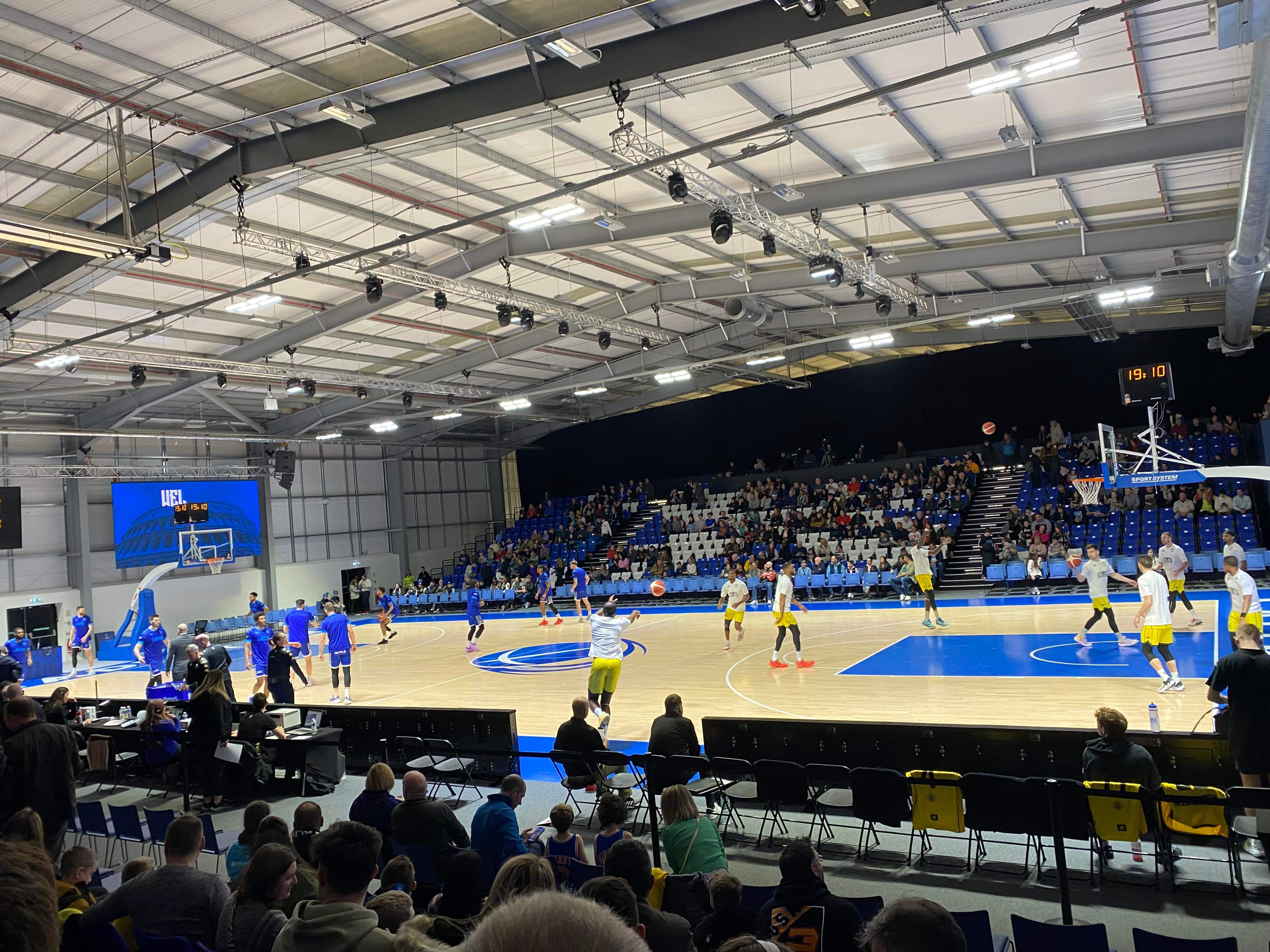
- The temporary arena in 2023
- Interactive map of Playsport Arena
- Location: East Kilbride, Scotland, United Kingdom
- Coordinates: 55.7817°N 4.1749°W
- Capacity: Temporary: 1,800; Overall: 6,000 (on completion, Phase 2)

Construction
- Groundbreaking: 2022
- Opened: 2023
- Renovated: 2023
- Cost: £20 million
- Architect: Holmes Miller

Tenant
- Caledonia Gladiators

Playsport Arena is a two-stage sports and entertainment arena in East Kilbride, Scotland. The main arena has a seating capacity for 6,000 spectators. The arena's main tenants are the Caledonia Gladiators basketball teams, who moved from their previous homes at the Emirates Arena in Glasgow (men's team) and the Lagoon Centre in Paisley (women's team) for the 2023–24 season.

== History ==
The 90-acre Playsport site, location between the Nerston and Stewartfield areas on the northern edge of the town, was first opened in 2009, with a nine-hole golf course, driving range and indoor sports, leisure and retail facilities, but remained largely underdeveloped for many years.

The site was purchased by Gladiators' owners Steve and Alison Timoney, and plans were officially announced in 2023 for a £20 million arena development.

In the short term, a temporary arena with capacity for 1,800 spectators was constructed within the original footprint to allow the Gladiators' teams to move to the site for the start of the 2023–24 season; it staged its first official fixture on 5 October 2023. It is expected the full 6,000 capacity arena development will be completed by 2026.
