= Dave Gardner (basketball) =

British basketball player

Personal information
- Born: 1 February 1964 (age 62) Birkenhead, England
- Listed height: 6 ft 9 in (2.06 m)
- Listed weight: 240 lb (109 kg)

Career information
- Playing career: 1982–2002
- Position: Center
- Number: 11
- Coaching career: 1998–1999

Career history

Playing
- 1982–1990: Warrington Vikings / Manchester United / Manchester Eagles
- 1990–1995: Cheshire Jets / Chester Jets
- 1995–1997: Manchester Giants
- 1997–1998; 1999–2002: Chester Jets

Coaching
- 1998–1999: Manchester Giants (assistant)

Career highlights
- No. 11 retired by Cheshire Phoenix

Dave Gardner (born 1 February 1964) is a British former basketball player who played for the Chester Jets and Manchester Giants of the British Basketball League. Gardner also played 59 games for England. In honour of Gardner's services to his 'hometown' club, the Chester Jets retired his number 11 jersey in 2002.
