= Graham Hunter =

Scottish basketball player (born 1982)

Graham Ian Hunter (born 17 May 1982 in Rutherglen) is a Scottish former professional basketball player.

== Early career ==
Hunter has been a basketball traveller from an early age netting a chance at just 16 to play and study in the United States for Ukiah High School, Oregon in 1998. Immediately taking charge of his team becoming an instant starter and captain of the Ukiah Cougars, Hunter was named the team's Most Valuable Player for the season. The Cougars did not have a great side, however Hunter was able to generate interest from the University of Portland (NCAA 1), Oregon State University (NCAA 1) and a number of junior colleges. Hunter was also selected to represent Oregon in the 1999 USA Junior Nationals which was held in Columbus, Ohio. It was at Ukiah that Hunter started making real progress, reported in the Sunday Mail:

I'd get up at 5am and shoot for two hours then go to class. That's where I developed my shot.

Returning to Blantyre in 1999 to finish high school, Hunter played for the Troon Tornadoes under 18s, under 21s, and senior men. A notable player to the club contributing to a very successful season for the Tornadoes in which they won the Scottish under 21s Cup, and at under 18s level winning the Scottish Cup, Scottish Men's National League, Strathclyde League, and was also selected to represent Scotland national basketball team.

== Later career ==
Hunter again moved, committing to the East Durham National Basketball Academy in 2001. After two years at the sporting school Hunter returned to the United States to take on a full athletic scholarship in 2003 at the University of Maine at Augusta but left prematurely after his freshman year due to a prolonged injury and subsequent surgery.

Again globetrotting, however to Andorra this time to attend TBCA basketball summer camp 2006. Again impressing scouts and agents, Hunter sparked interest which progressed to a professional contract.

== Professional career ==
He started his professional career upon signing with Club Baloncesto Ponfferada, Spain, in 2006. For reasons unknown Hunter transferred home to Glasgow to play for the well respected Scottish Rocks. Competing in the British Basketball League, the Rocks finished as runners-up in the BBL Trophy and BBL Cup in 2007.

After spending the summer with the Scotland senior men squad, Hunter then signed for another team in Spain, CB Puertollano, and is currently playing for St Mirren Saints Basketball Club in the Scottish Men's National League.

== Scholarship ==
Upon Hunter's return to Glasgow, he was offered a number of opportunities across the United Kingdom, however committed to a sports scholarship combined with the first Lisa Wilson Memorial sports scholarship in 2004 to Southampton Solent University (formerly Southampton Institute). Hunter admits he struggled through injury upon arrival, however stated it was his time in Southampton that allowed him to regain his skills and confidence after snapping his fifth metatarsal in 2003. Competing in the BUSA Premier South Conference, and also in the English Basketball League, Division 1, for the Solent Stars.

He later operated 'Reach For The Stars Basketball' a community coaching initiative for children.
