= Sterling Davis =

American-British basketball player and coach

Personal information
- Born: October 27, 1977 (age 49) Duncanville, Texas, U.S.
- Listed height: 6 ft 7 in (2.01 m)

Career information
- College: Tulane (1995–1999)
- NBA draft: 1999: undrafted
- Playing career: 1999–2015
- Position: Forward
- Coaching career: 2007–2017

Career history

Playing
- 1999–2000: Montevideo
- 2000–2001: Central Entrerriano
- 2001–2003: Brighton Bears
- 2003: London Towers
- 2004: Giessen 46ers
- 2004–2006: Sheffield Sharks
- 2006–2015: Scottish Rocks / Glasgow Rocks

Coaching
- 2007–2017: Scottish Rocks / Glasgow Rocks

Sterling Davis (born October 27, 1977) is a retired basketball player and former head coach of British Basketball League club Glasgow Rocks from 2007 to 2017.

A 6' 7" power forward, Davis signed for the Rocks in 2006, after spells with fellow British sides Sheffield Sharks (2004–2006), London Towers (2003) and Brighton Bears (2001–2003), where he was a BBL All Star in 2002 and runner-up league MVP whilst gaining all-league team nods in 2002 and 2003. He scored a career-high 42 points on March 1, 2011 in a game against the Guildford Heat. He spent the 2000–1 season with Uruguayan team Aguada and Argentine club Central Entrerriano.

Originally appointed as player-coach in Glasgow in 2007, Davis retired from playing in 2015 to focus solely on coaching. He left the Rocks in May 2017 after reaching four major finals during his tenure.

Davis played NCAA college basketball at Tulane University., finishing his four years with averages of 17.7 points and 3.6 rebounds. He holds UK and USA citizenship.
