= Ted Berry (basketball) =

American basketball player

Ted Berry (born June 4, 1972, Richmond, Virginia) is a professional basketball player. The guard attended Christopher Newport University in Virginia.

In 1997, Berry moved to the UK to play for Derby Storm in the British Basketball League (BBL). He was acquired by new franchise the Edinburgh Rocks in 1998 where his virtuoso style made him a firm favourite with the fans. His six seasons in the UK gave him EU residency and even made him eligible to represent Scotland at international level. However, Berry moved on to French team Rueil in 2003, where he led the side to the promotion play-off final. He currently plays for Spanish club Provincia de Palencia after stint in France's Pro A and B.

In 2007, he founded the Tri-City Summer League in his hometown of Richmond, bringing the best local players together for a series of free off-season games. It replaced the previous league in which Berry was a regular participant.

== Career history ==
- 2008–2009 (Spain) Gijón Baloncesto (LEB Plata)
- 2007–2008 (Spain) Palencia Baloncesto (LEB Plata)
- 2006–2007 (Spain) Bàsquet Inca (LEB)
- 2005 (France) Orléans Loiret Basket
- 2005 (France) Charleville
- 2004 (France) SLUC Nancy
- 2004 (France) Brest
- 2003 (France) Rueil
- 1998–2003 (United Kingdom) Edinburgh/Scottish Rocks (BBL)
- 1997–1998 (United Kingdom) Derby Storm (BBL)
- 1996–1997 (United States) Fargo Beez (International Basketball Association)
- 1995 (United States) Asheville Smokies (American Major Basketball League)
- 1994–1995 (Australia) Horsham Hornets
- 1994 (United States) Long Island Surf (USBL)

== Honours ==
- BBL All-star: 1997–98, 1998–99, 1999–00, 2000–01, 2001–02
- BBL MVP: 1998–99
- BBL Playoff winner: 2002–2003

== Trivia ==
- Berry's former team Scottish Rocks retired his number 5 jersey in honour of his service to the club.

== See also ==
- Scottish Rocks
