= Billy Singleton =

Personal information
- Born: June 1, 1968 (age 58) New York City, New York, U.S.
- Listed height: 6 ft 7 in (2.01 m)

Career information
- High school: Adlai E. Stevenson (Bronx, New York)
- College: St. John's (1987–1991)
- NBA draft: 1991: undrafted
- Playing career: 1991–2007
- Position: Center

Career history
- 1995–1997: Chester Jets
- 1997–1999: Leicester Riders
- 1999–2000: Thames Valley Tigers
- 2000–2002: Leicester Riders
- 2002–2003: Scottish Rocks
- 2003: JA Vichy
- 2003–2007: Chester Jets

Billy Singleton (born June 1, 1968) is an American former professional basketball player, most notable for his career in the British Basketball League. Singleton is the 4th leading scorer in British basketball history & 5th leading rebounder in British basketball history, 3rd in field goal percentage in British basketball history. Billy is the product of a true basketball family and credits his basketball achievement to his two older sisters & his uncle. - Lorna Singleton (L.I.U. women's Basketball 1981-1985 Hall of Fame) - Carla Singleton (1983-1987 Northeastern University Hall of Fame) -Ed Pinckney (1981-1985 Villanova University, National Champions, NBA, Chicago Bulls Assistant Coach)

The forward last played for the Chester Jets, where he occupied the role of top assistant coach for 1 season, head coach for 2 seasons.

In 2007, Singleton accepted the offer to become Director of Basketball Operations at his former college, St. John's of the Big East Conference.

In 2014 he became the Lead Assistant for Men's Basketball at Nyack College and has entered his third season as an associate coach in 2017.

== Career ==
- 1987-1988: (United States) St. John's (NCAA)
- 1988-1989: (United States) St. John's (NCAA)
- 1989-1990: (United States) St. John's (NCAA)
- 1990-1991: (United States) St. John's (NCAA)
- 1991-1991: (Republic of Ireland) Queens Annadale
- 1992-1993: (United Kingdom) Birmingham Bullets
- 1993-1994: (Cyprus) AEL Limassol
- 1994 National De Ingenieros/ Honduras
- 1994-1995: (Israel) Maccabi Naharya
- 1995 Santiago Chile
- 1995-1996: (United Kingdom) Chester Jets
- 1996-1997: (United Kingdom) Chester Jets
- 1997-1998: (United Kingdom) Leicester Riders
- 1998-1999: (United Kingdom) Leicester Riders
- 1999-2000: (United Kingdom) Thames Valley Tigers
- 2000 Dandenong Rangers Australia
- 2000-2001: (United Kingdom) Leicester Riders
- 2001-2002: (United Kingdom) Leicester Riders
- 2002-2003: (United Kingdom) Scottish Rocks

(in May, 2003, signed 1-game contract with Vichy Auvergne)

- 2003-2004: (United Kingdom) Chester Jets
- 2004-2005: (United Kingdom) Chester Jets
- 2005-2006: (United Kingdom) Chester Jets (Player/Coach)
- 2006-2007: (United Kingdom) Chester Jets {Player/Coach}

== Awards and achievements ==
- New York City Player of the year 1987 Iron Horse Award Winner
- All-City, All-State, All-American 1987
- 1991 Captain of St. John's University Basketball Team (Elight 8)
- AAU Junior Olympic National Championship Team,(Gauchos) 1987
- Big East All-Star Team, 1990
- English All-Star Game, 1993, 1997 1998 and 1999
- English League All-Star Team, 1997
- Player Of The Year Honduras 1994
- Israeli League Newcomer of the Year, 1995
- BBL Champion, 2001 and 2003
- National Cup Winner, 2000–2001
- National Cup Runner-up, 1997–1998
- BBL Trophy Winner, 2003–2004
- BBL Trophy Runner-up, 1996–1997
- BBL Championship Winner, 2004–2005
- Play-off Runner-up, 2003–2004 and 2004–2005
- Play-off Winner, 2000–2001 and 2002–2003
