= Cheshire Phoenix =

British professional basketball team

- League: SLB
- Established: 1984; 42 years ago
- History: Ellesmere Port Jets (1984–1988); Chester Jets (1988–2007); Cheshire Jets (2007–2012); Cheshire Phoenix (2012–present)
- Arena: Cheshire Oaks Arena
- Capacity: 1,400
- Location: Ellesmere Port, Cheshire
- Team colours: Navy blue, yellow, sky blue
- Head coach: Ben Thomas
- Championships: 2 BBL Championship; 1 BBL Playoffs; 2 BBL Cup; 6 BBL Trophy
- Website: CheshirePhoenix.com
Home	Away

The Cheshire Phoenix are an English professional basketball team based in Ellesmere Port, Cheshire. Founded in 1984, they are members of Super League Basketball and play their home games at the Cheshire Oaks Arena. From 1993 until 2015 the team was based in Chester, where they enjoyed their most success. Under previous ownership, the team was known as the Cheshire Jets, but due to financial difficulties the franchise was withdrawn from the league in November 2012 and reformed as the Phoenix. The team's head coach is Ben Thomas.

The Phoenix have won two BBL championships, one BBL playoffs title, two BBL Cups, and six BBL Trophies. Home games are played at the Cheshire Oaks Arena, which has a capacity of 1,400.

== Franchise history ==
=== Origin ===
The team was first formed from the ruins of the Ellesmere Port team, St Saviour's, in 1984. The team was initially named after their sponsors, Motocraft Centre Ellesmere Port. However, after the loss of their sponsor, they renamed themselves the Ellesmere Port Jets.

The Jets were admitted to NBL Division 2 in 1986 and finished last in their first season, with just a single victory. Edging up to seventh in 1987–88, they then changed their name to Cheshire Jets, though still continuing to play in Ellesmere Port. They continued a steady mid-table development until, in 1991, they won the divisional title despite suffering five defeats. The same year, the Jets moved up into the BBL joining in with Britain's elite basketball teams. Later however, the arena in Ellesmere Port became unsuitable, and so in 1993 the Jets were forced to move to Chester, and into the Northgate Arena. The move was reflected in another name change to the Chester Jets.

The real turning point for the Jets came in 1996, when the application of the Bosman ruling to basketball resulted in the departure of many of the top English players to European clubs, and the BBL changed its eligibility rule to entitle teams to use five non-national players.

Trans-Atlantic recruitment by coach and co-owner Mike Burton resulted in a team which finished fifth in the League table in 1997. Subsequent seasons have seen their best-ever performances in 2002 (Northern Conference Champions) and 2003 (3rd in the re-unified League), and a string of successes in the BBL trophy (4-times winners, from 2001 to 2004), culminating in the League Championship in 2005.

On 7 April 2007, prior to the Jets' season finale at home to Guildford Heat, an 81–102 defeat, club owner and head coach Mike Burton announced that he would be retiring from the franchise at the end of the 2006–07 season. Burton's announcement, after 19 years at the helm, raised serious doubts of the clubs' future, with mounting debts and lack of financial backing. Shortly after the announcement, fans formed a committee to help save the club and received the backing of players including former Jet James Hamilton. Following a sponsorship deal agreed during the summer of 2007 with local firm BiG Storage to save the club and preserve their future, the Jets was renamed as the BiG Storage Cheshire Jets to cover the wider demographic of Cheshire county in line with BiG Storage's market coverage. When BiG Storage terminated the sponsorship, the managing director of the company arranged a successor sponsor; Cheshire West and Chester Council.

The club was plunged into chaos in November 2012 when, after only 7 games into the season, the British Basketball League withdrew the club's franchise from owner Haydn Cook after he notified them that he was going to cancel the players contracts and cancelled all future fixtures.

The club had until the end of November to find £50,000 to preserve its status in top-flight basketball. Local businesses were found to donate money and become sponsors, thus saving the club and fulfilling its fixture list as planned.

On 28 January 2024, the Phoenix won their sixth BBL Trophy following an upset win over the favoured London Lions in the final.

== Home arenas ==
Ellesmere Port Leisure Centre (1984–1993)
Northgate Arena (1993–2015)
Cheshire Oaks Arena (2015–present)

== Logos ==
2012–2020

2020–present

== Season-by-season records ==
Seasons 1986–2024
Season	Division	Tier	Regular Season						Post-Season	Trophy	Cup	Head coach
Season	Division	Tier	Finish	Played	Wins	Losses	Points	Win %	Post-Season	Trophy	Cup	Head coach
Ellesmere Port Jets
1986–87	NBL2	2	10th	18	1	17	2	0.056	Did not qualify		1st round (NC)	
1987–88	NBL1	2	7th	18	7	11	14	0.389	Did not qualify		2nd round (NC)	
Cheshire Jets
1988–89	NBL1	2	8th	20	6	14	12	0.300	Did not qualify		2nd round (NC)	
1989–90	NBL1	2	6th	22	10	12	20	0.455	Quarter-finals		Quarter-finals (NC)	Mike Burton
1990–91	NBL1	2	1st	22	17	5	34	0.773	Quarter-finals		Quarter-finals (NC)	Mike Burton
1991–92	BBL	1	11th	30	2	28	4	0.067	Did not qualify	1st round (BT)	3rd round (NC)	Mike Burton
1992–93	BBL	1	10th	33	10	23	20	0.303	Did not qualify	1st round (BT)	Quarter-finals (NC)	Mike Burton
Chester Jets
1993–94	BBL	1	11th	36	11	25	22	0.306	Did not qualify	1st round (BT)	Quarter-finals (NC)	Mike Burton
1994–95	BBL	1	12th	36	6	30	12	0.167	Did not qualify	1st round (BT)	Quarter-finals (NC)	Mike Burton
1995–96	BBL	1	12th	36	8	28	16	0.222	Did not qualify	Quarter-finals (BT)	4th round (NC)	Mike Burton
1996–97	BBL	1	5th	36	24	12	48	0.667	Semi-finals	Runners-Up (BT)	4th round (NC)	Mike Burton
1997–98	BBL	1	10th	36	15	21	30	0.417	Did not qualify	1st round (BT)	4th round (NC)	Mike Burton
1998–99	BBL	1	11th	36	10	26	20	0.278	Did not qualify	Quarter-finals (BT)	Quarter-finals (NC)	Mike Burton
1999–00	BBL N	1	4th	36	17	19	34	0.472	Quarter-finals	Quarter-finals (BT)	1st round (NC)	Robbie Peers
2000–01	BBL N	1	2nd	36	25	11	50	0.694	Quarter-finals	Winners, beating Newcastle, 92–81	1st round (NC)	Robbie Peers
2001–02	BBL N	1	1st	32	24	8	48	0.750	Winners, beating Sheffield, 93–82	Winners, beating MK, 90–89	Winners, beating Birmingham, 112–105	Robbie Peers
2002–03	BBL	1	3rd	40	28	12	56	0.700	Quarter-finals	Winners, beating London, 84–82	Runners-Up (NC)	Robbie Peers
2003–04	BBL	1	5th	36	22	14	44	0.611	Runners-Up	Winners, beating Brighton, 68–66	1st round (NC)	Paul Smith
2004–05	BBL	1	1st	40	32	8	64	0.800	Runners-Up	Semi-finals (BT)	Semi-finals (BC)	Paul Smith
2005–06	BBL	1	7th	40	17	23	34	0.425	Quarter-finals	1st round (BT)	Semi-finals (BC)	Billy Singleton
2006–07	BBL	1	9th	36	10	26	20	0.278	Did not qualify	Quarter-finals (BT)	1st round (BC)	Billy Singleton
Cheshire Jets
2007–08	BBL	1	11th	33	9	24	18	0.273	Did not qualify	Semi-finals (BT)	Quarter-finals (BC)	TJ Walker; Paul Smith
2008–09	BBL	1	8th	33	15	18	30	0.455	Quarter-finals	1st round (BT)	Quarter-finals (BC)	Paul Smith
2009–10	BBL	1	4th	36	22	14	44	0.611	Quarter-finals	Runners-Up (BT)	Runners-Up (BC)	Paul Smith
2010–11	BBL	1	4th	33	20	13	40	0.606	Semi-finals	1st round (BT)	Semi-finals (BC)	Paul Smith
2011–12	BBL	1	6th	30	13	17	26	0.433	Semi-finals	1st round (BT)	Quarter-finals (BC)	John Lavery
Cheshire Phoenix
2012–13	BBL	1	11th	33	10	23	20	0.303	Did not qualify	Semi-finals (BT)	1st round (BC)	Matthew Lloyd
2013–14	BBL	1	5th	33	18	15	36	0.545	Quarter-finals	Semi-finals (BT)	1st round (BC)	John Lavery
2014–15	BBL	1	4th	36	26	10	52	0.722	Semi-finals	1st round (BT)	Quarter-finals (BC)	John Coffino
2015–16	BBL	1	7th	33	16	17	32	0.485	Semi-finals	Quarter-finals (BT)	Semi-finals (BC)	John Lavery
2016–17	BBL	1	10th	33	11	22	22	0.333	Did not qualify	Semi-finals (BT)	Quarter-finals (BC)	Colin O'Reilly; Ben Thomas
2017–18	BBL	1	9th	33	15	18	30	0.455	Did not qualify	Quarter-finals (BT)	Winners, beating Worcester, 99–88	Ben Thomas
2018–19	BBL	1	7th	33	17	16	34	0.515	Quarter-finals	Quarter-finals (BT)	Quarter-finals (BC)	Ben Thomas
2019–20	BBL	1	Season cancelled due to COVID-19 pandemic							Semi-finals (BT)	Quarter-finals (BC)	Ben Thomas
2020–21	BBL	1	7th	30	14	16	28	0.467	Quarter-finals	Quarter-finals (BT)	Pool Stage (BC)	Ben Thomas
2021–22	BBL	1	6th	27	13	14	26	0.481	Quarter-finals	Winners, beating London (BT)	Quarter-finals (BC)	Ben Thomas
2022–23	BBL	1	5th	36	19	17	38	0.528	Semi-finals	Runners-Up (BT)	Quarter-finals (BC)	Ben Thomas
2023–24	BBL	1	2nd	36	23	13	46	0.639	Runners-Up	Winners, beating London (BT)		Ben Thomas

=== SLB season-by-season ===
Champions	SLB champions	Runners-up	Playoff berth

Season	Tier	League	Regular season					Postseason	Cup	Trophy	Head coach
Season	Tier	League	Finish	Played	Wins	Losses	Win %	Postseason	Cup	Trophy	Head coach
Cheshire Phoenix
2024–25	1	SLB	6th	32	14	18	.438	Quarterfinals	Quarterfinals	Semifinals	Ben Thomas
2025–26	1	SLB	2nd	32	20	12	.625	Runners-up	Semifinals	Semifinals	Ben Thomas
Championship record				64	34	30	.531	0 championships			
Playoff record				7	5	2	.714	0 playoff championships			

== Trophies ==
=== League ===
- NBL Division One Winners: 1990–91 1
- BBL Championship Winners: 2001–02, & 2004–05 2
- BBL Championship Runners Up: 2000–01 1
- SLB Championship Runners Up: 2025–26 1

=== Playoffs ===
- BBL Championship Play Off Winners: 2001–02 1
- BBL Championship Play Off Runners Up: 2003–04, 2004–05, & 2023-24 3
- SLB Championship Play Off Runners Up: 2025–26 1

=== Trophy ===
- BBL Trophy Winners: 2000–01, 2001–02, 2002–03, 2003–04, 2021–22, 2023–24 6
- BBL Trophy Runners Up: 1996–97, 2009–10, 2022–23 3

=== Cup ===
- National Cup Winners: 2001–02, 2017–18 2
- National Cup Runners Up: 2000–01, 2009–10 2

== Players ==
=== Current roster ===
Note: Flags indicate national team eligibility at FIBA-sanctioned events. Players may hold other non-FIBA nationalities not displayed.

Cheshire Phoenix roster
Players
Coaches

Pos.	No.	Nat.	Name	Ht.	Wt.	Age
PG	1	(United Kingdom)	Wild, Greg	1.85 m (6 ft 1 in)	86 kg (190 lb)	24 – 20 May 2002
SF	2	(United States)	Diggins, Michael	2.04 m (6 ft 8 in)	86 kg (190 lb)	28 – 11 January 1998
G	3	(United States)	Rideau, LaQuincy	1.85 m (6 ft 1 in)	95 kg (209 lb)	30 – 28 March 1996
PF	5	(United States)	Policelli, Frankie	2.06 m (6 ft 9 in)	102 kg (225 lb)	26 – 11 April 2000
PG	6	(United Kingdom)	Paradysz, Lukasz	1.85 m (6 ft 1 in)
G/F	9	(United States)	Lindo, Damiri	1.96 m (6 ft 5 in)	98 kg (216 lb)
SG	11	(New Zealand)	Cameron, Tobias	1.96 m (6 ft 5 in)	95 kg (209 lb)	27 – 21 February 1999
	15	(United Kingdom)	Pierre-Louis, Rafi
SG	23	(United States)	Brenchley, Jaxon	1.96 m (6 ft 5 in)	91 kg (201 lb)
F/C	24	(Republic of Ireland)	Zona, Matt	2.06 m (6 ft 9 in)	113 kg (249 lb)	24 – 23 February 2002
F	99	(United States)	White, Skyler	2.02 m (6 ft 8 in)	100 kg (220 lb)	33 – 24 August 1993

Head coach

- (United Kingdom) Ben Thomas (basketball)

Assistant coach(es)

- (United Kingdom) Jack Hudson
- (United Kingdom) Tom Fletcher

Legend

- (C) Team captain
- Injured

=== Notable players ===
Note: Flags indicate national team eligibility at FIBA-sanctioned events. Players may hold other non-FIBA nationalities not displayed.

Criteria

To appear in this section a player must have either:

- Set a club record or won an individual award while at the club
- Played at least one official international match for their national team at any time
- Played at least one official NBA match at any time.

- (United Kingdom) Dave Gardner
- (United Kingdom) Delme Herriman
- (United Kingdom) John Simpson
- (United Kingdom) Paul Sturgess
- (United Kingdom) Alto Virgil
- (Albania) Elvisi Dusha
- (Antigua and Barbuda) Julius Hodge
- (Australia) Adrien Sturt
- (Bulgaria) Simeon Naydenov
- (Canada) Greg Meldrum
- (Canada) Greg Francis
- (Cayman Islands) Jorge Ebanks
- (Fiji) Joshua Fox
- (Republic of Ireland) Jason Killeen
- (Republic of Ireland) Colin O'Reilly
- (New Zealand) Pero Cameron
- (New Zealand) Tony Rampton
- (United States) Todd Cauthorn
- (United States) Correy Childs
- (United States) Martyn Gayle
- (United States) Kenny Gregory
- (United States) James Hamilton
- (United States) John McCord
- (United States) Louis McCullough
- (United States) Loren Meyer
- (United States) Pat Robinson III
- (United States) Billy Singleton
- (United States) TJ Walker
- (United States) Demond Watt
- (United States) Jordan Williams

=== Retired numbers ===
Cheshire Phoenix retired numbers
No.	Nat.	Player	Position	Tenure
11	(United Kingdom)	Dave Gardner	C	1990–1995, 1997–1998 & 1999–2003

=== FIBA Hall of Famers ===
Cheshire Phoenix Hall of Famers
Players
No.	Nat.	Name	Position	Tenure	Inducted
13	(New Zealand)	Pero Cameron	G	1999–2003	2017

== See also ==
- Basketball in England
- British Basketball League
