= Brighton Cougars =

Basketball club in Brighton, England

- League: Basketball England and Basketball Sussex
- Established: 1989
- History: Brighton Cougars; 1989-present
- Arena: Dorothy Stringer School
- Location: Brighton, East Sussex
- Team colours: Blue and Gold
- Ownership: Community Sports Club
Home	Away

The Brighton Cougars are an English basketball club from the city of Brighton. The Cougars play at Dorothy Stringer School and attract a broad-based membership of boys and girls from five years old through to adult men and women.

== History ==
Established in 1989, the club was founded to offer sessions to develop and improve basketball skills and techniques within the local community, and entered senior teams to compete in the local Sussex League and junior teams in local age-group leagues. Ten years after their founding, the club made a move into the National League, where they competed for five seasons from 1999 to 2004. Despite some strong performances and two appearances in the playoffs, the club never made it beyond the lower reaches of the league, and financial concerns led the club to drop out of national competition after the 2003–2004 season, returning to the local Sussex League.

The club came to wider prominence when they applied to join the professional British Basketball League in 2007. The club aimed to compete in Britain's top-tier league in the 2008-09 season, and would have occupied the spot vacated by Brighton's former professional basketball franchise the Brighton Bears, which folded in 2006. However the application was turned down in favour of Worthing Thunder, a local rival team. After their unsuccessful application, the Cougars made a brief return to the National League, but dropped out of Division Four Midlands South after a single disappointing season saw them finish second-from-bottom.

The Cougars returned once again to the Sussex League for several years, building their fanbase and their reach within the community. In 2014, the decision was taken to re-launch the National League team, in order to offer junior players a further outlet to progress. An application was made and accepted to join the English Basketball League in the 2014–15 season, which led to the club being awarded a place in Division 4 (South East). The team's first season back in the league ended in a respectable 5th-place finish, finishing only two wins short of a place in the playoffs.

== Season-by-season records ==
Season	Division	Played	Won	Lost	Points	League	Playoffs	National Cup	National Trophy	Patron's Cup	National Shield
Brighton Cougars
1999-2000	NBL Division 3	24	7	17	14	11th	DNQ	DNE	DNE	DNE	
2000-01	NBL Division 3	22	11	11	22	4th	Quarter-Final	DNE	DNE	DNE	2nd Round
2001-02	NBL Division 2 (South)	16	8	8	16	5th	DNQ	DNE	DNE	DNE	Quarter-Final
2002-03	NBL Division 2 (South)	14	8	6	16	4th	Quarter-Final	DNE	DNE	DNE	Quarter-Final
2003-04	EBL Division 3 (South)	18	3	15	6	9th	DNQ	1st Round	DNE	DNE	2nd Round
2004-08	Local Competition										
2008-09	EBL Division 4 (Midlands South)	21	4	17	8	7th	DNQ	1st Round	DNE	DNE	1st Round
2009-14	Local Competition										
2014-15	EBL Division 4 (South East)	20	13	7	26	5th	DNQ	1st Round	DNE	DNE	2nd Round

== See also ==
- Brighton Bears
- British Basketball League
