= John Thomas (basketball) =

American basketball player (born 1975)

Personal information
- Born: September 8, 1975 (age 51) Minneapolis, Minnesota, U.S.
- Listed height: 6 ft 9 in (2.06 m)
- Listed weight: 265 lb (120 kg)

Career information
- High school: Roosevelt (Minneapolis, Minnesota)
- College: Minnesota (1993–1997)
- NBA draft: 1997: 1st round, 25th overall pick
- Drafted by: New York Knicks
- Playing career: 1997–2013
- Position: Power forward / center
- Number: 55, 12, 25, 41

Career history
- 1997–1998: Boston Celtics
- 1998–2000: Toronto Raptors
- 2001–2002: Diablos de La Vega
- 2002–2003: Dakota Wizards
- 2003–2004: Casademont Girona
- 2004–2005: Minnesota Timberwolves
- 2005: Memphis Grizzlies
- 2005–2006: Atlanta Hawks
- 2006: New Jersey Nets
- 2007–2008: Colorado 14ers
- 2009–2010: Hapoel Holon
- 2011: Aris
- 2011–2012: Hapoel Jerusalem
- 2012: Jeonju KCC Egis

Career highlights
- Israeli League Rebounding Leader (2010)
- Stats at NBA.com
- Stats at Basketball Reference

John Thomas (born September 8, 1975) is an American former professional basketball player. He was the captain of the 1996–97 Minnesota Golden Gophers team that advanced to the 1997 NCAA Semi-Final.

Thomas was selected by the New York Knicks with the 25th pick in the 1997 NBA draft, although he never played a game with them as he was traded, along with Dontae' Jones, Walter McCarty and Scott Brooks, to the Boston Celtics in exchange for Chris Mills and two conditional second-round draft choices on October 22, 1997. Four months later, he was again traded, this time to the Toronto Raptors, alongside Chauncey Billups, Dee Brown and Roy Rogers, for Kenny Anderson, Zan Tabak and Popeye Jones. He signed as a free agent with the Minnesota Timberwolves in October 2004, appearing in 44 games over the course of the entire season. Thomas was claimed off waivers by the Atlanta Hawks in November 2005 from the Memphis Grizzlies and subsequently placed on waivers again on January 5, 2006. To complete the season he appeared in two games with the New Jersey Nets.

He signed with Hapoel Holon in 2009. In 2009–10, he was the top rebounder in the Israel Basketball Premier League.

In January 2011, he signed with Aris B.C. in Greece, but he was released in April 2011. He signed with Jeonju KCC Egis in South Korea the following season.

As of 2014, Thomas was the National Coordinator for Ultimate Hoops, an adult basketball league. As of 2015 he was their National Manager of Training.
