= Coventry Skydome =

Arena in Coventry, England

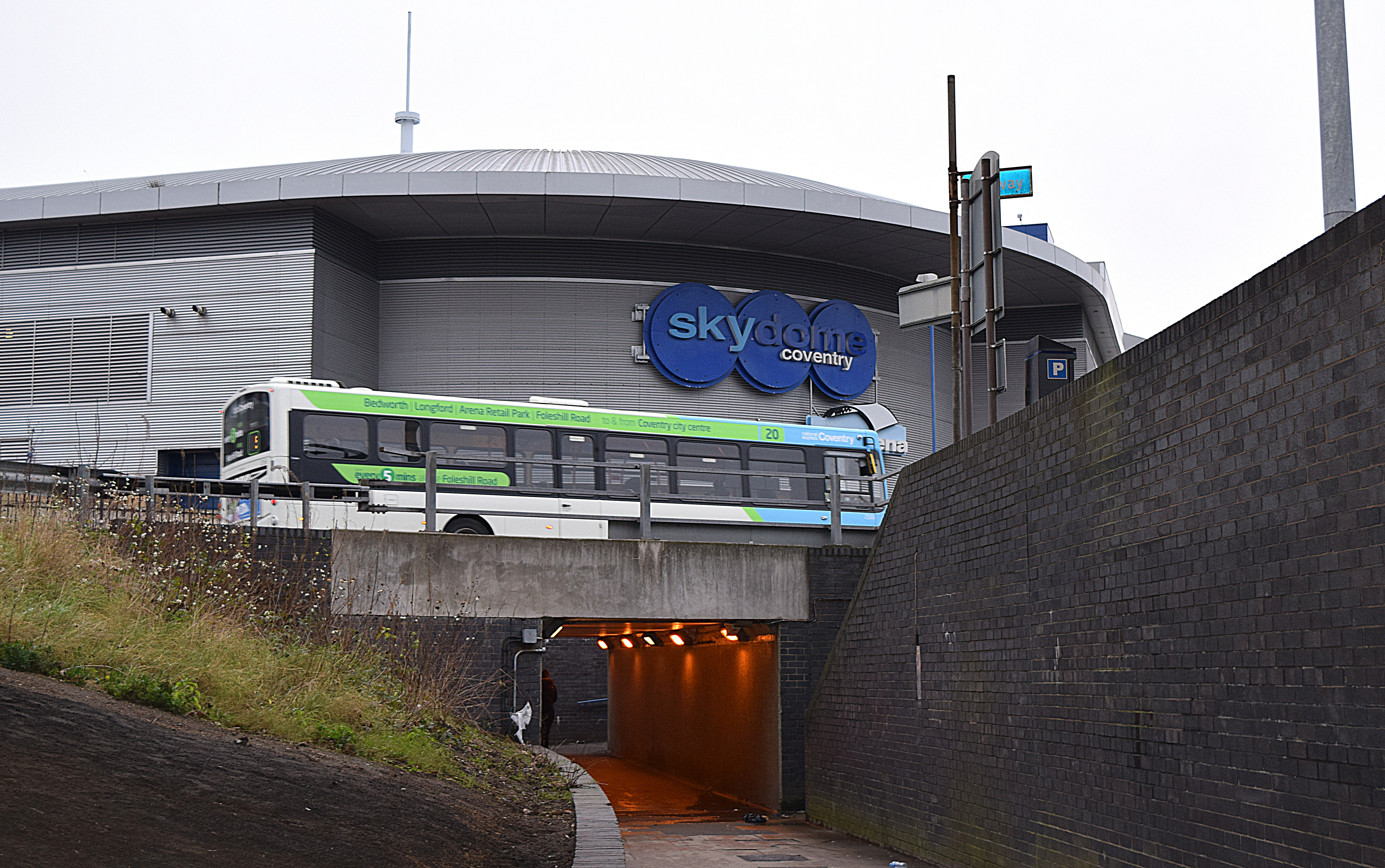
- Interactive map of Coventry Skydome
- Full name: Coventry Skydome
- Former names: Planet Ice Arena; SkyDome Arena
- Location: Croft Rd Coventry CV1 3AZ, England
- Coordinates: 52.40742°N 1.518677°W
- Capacity: 3,000

Construction
- Opened: 1999

Tenant
- Coventry Blaze (EIHL) (2006-present)

Coventry Skydome (also known as Planet Ice Coventry) is a 3,000-seat multi-purpose arena in Coventry, England.

== History ==
=== Ice Hockey ===
The arena contains an ice rink operated by Planet Ice, which is the current home of Elite League ice hockey franchise the Coventry Blaze.

=== Ice Skating ===
The arena hosts classes from the International School of Skating.

=== Basketball ===
The arena has been used for the FIBA European Basketball Championship qualifier between England and Italy on 20 November 2002, with Italy scoring a 97–39 point victory.

=== Professional Wrestling ===
The arena hosted several large professional wrestling shows not long after its opening, and established itself on the British wrestling circuit. In 2005, the venue hosted The Wrestling Channel's International Showdown with the Frontier Wrestling Alliance. A WWE event was also held at the venue in the same year. A couple of years later hosted TNA Wrestling and Pro Wrestling Noah events in 2008, with TNA returning to the venue as part of its Maximum Impact tour in 2010. The venue also hosted WhatCulture Pro Wrestling in 2017. WWE would return to the venue in 2019 with its NXT UK brand.

=== Music ===
The arena host occasional music concerts and performances. Performances include UB40 and the SAMA African Music Festival featuring Winky D, Mafikizolo.
