= Kingston Wildcats =

Kingston Wildcats School of Basketball
- League: Surrey League, Basketball England National League
- Established: 1983
- History: Tolworth Reckers; 1983-1992; Chessington Wildcats; 1993-1998; Kingston Wildcats; 1998-present
- Arena: Chessington Sports Centre (Capacity: 200)
- Location: Kingston upon Thames, Chessington
- Team colours: Royal blue, white
- Ownership: Members Club
Home	Away

Kingston Wildcats School of Basketball is a community basketball development club originating from Kingston that compete in the Surrey League and Basketball England National League. The club acts as "school of basketball" for players in the Royal Borough of Kingston and Surrey with teams for players between the ages of 8 and 16. The club also runs a senior men's team and its practices and home fixtures take place at Chessington School.

== History ==
The team was founded in 1983 and played as Tolworth Reckers in the Surrey League until 1994 when as Chessington Wildcats they moved up to the regional NBL Division Three South. In 1996 they were promoted to the national NBL Division 2.

The team changed their name to Kingston Wildcats in an attempt to improve its profile in 1998 and this coupled with some shrewd recruiting culminated in winning the Division Two Play off final at Wembley beating the highly fancied Manchester Magic. An automatic place in Division One was initially denied due to the capacity at Chessington Sports Centre being below the 500 stipulated for the division.

In 2000 to take their place in Division One they moved to Tolworth Recreation Centre. TRC had hosted top flight basketball in the 70's and 80's when Kingston Kings were one of the best teams in the country, however a large investment by both Kingston Council and Kingston Wildcats was required to get the centre's equipment up to the required standard.

The club withdrew from the EBL prior to the 2006/07 season due to financial problems, and returned to the Surrey League. In 2007/08 the club entered the National Founders Cup, getting to the final where they lost by one point to London Lithuanians. In 2008/09 a win against King's Lynn Ironwolf in the final of same competition gave the club their second trophy on the national stage. In 2009/10 an injury depleted team lost in the final once again to London Lithuanians this time by one point. In 2010/11 Kingston reached the final again, but lost 79 -70 to London Rocco's Raiders.

== Season-by-season National League records ==
Season	Division	Position	Played	Won	Lost	Points	Play Offs	National Trophy	National Cup
Kingston Wildcats
2005–2006	EBL Div1	9th	26	11	15	22	DNQ	DNQ	
2004–2005	EBL Div1	11th	22	5	17	10	DNQ	1st round	
2003–2004	EBL Div1	11th	22	4	17	8	DNQ	1st round	2nd round
2002–2003	NBL Conf	6th	22	11	11	22	1st round	1st round	
2001–2002	NBL Conf	4th	18	11	7	22	1st round	1st round	
2000–2001	NBL Div1	6th	18	6	12	12	2nd round	Q-F's	
1999–2000	NBL Div2	3rd	24	17	7	34	Winners		
1998–1999	NBL Div2	6th	26	16	10	32	1st round		
Chessington Wildcats
1997–1998	NBL Div2	12th	24	5	19	10	DNQ		
1996–1997	NBL Div2	11th	26	7	19	14	DNQ		
1995–1996	NBL Div3 South	2nd	16	14	2	28	1st round		
1994–1995	NBL Div3 South	4th	18	12	6	214			

- DNQ denotes Did not qualify.

== National Founders Cup ==
The Founders Cup is a national cup competition for clubs not playing in the national leagues. We first entered as Chessington Wildcats whilst in a regional league in 1994. There was then a long break while we were in the full national league. In 2007 Steve Rich and Mark Bottiglia organised a return to this competition. Coached by Phil Gunner the team made four finals in a row from 2008 to 2011.

Season	Stage Reached	Against	Score	Venue
2010–2011	Final	London Roccos Raiders	70 - 79	Medway Park
2009–2010	Final	London Lithuanians	60 - 61	Edmonton Green
2008–2009	Winners	King's Lynn Ironwolf	77 - 65	Derby
2007–2008	Final	Lithuanians	82 - 83	Derby
1995–1996	Final	Menwith Hill (USAF)	152 - 169	Two Legs
1994–1995	Quarter-Final	Warley	N/A	Chessington

== Trojans Wildcats Trophy ==
In 2009 club president Steve Burnett instigated the Trojans Wildcats Trophy. This was to become an annual game between Kingston Wildcats and Tile Hill Trojans from the Warwickshire League. The 2009 game was played at Warwick University, moving to Chessington Sports Centre in 2010. The series which is currently sponsored by Alto Clothing Ltd, now alternates between Surrey and Warwickshire venues.

Year	Location	Winners	Score	MVP
2011	Tile Hill	Tile Hill Trojans	80 - 86	Matt Jenner
2010	Chessington	Kingston Wildcats	87 - 69	Carl Plunkett
2009	Warwick University	Kingston Wildcats	77 - 71	Wes Chantler
