= Brighton Bears =

British basketball team based in Sussex

- League: British Basketball League
- Established: 1973
- Folded: 2006
- History: Brighton Bears; 1973–1984; Worthing Bears; 1984–1999; Brighton Bears; 1999–2006
- Location: Brighton, Sussex and Worthing, Sussex
- Team colours: Blue and White
- Ownership: Ricky Perrin
| Home | Away |

The Brighton Bears were a British basketball team based in Brighton, Sussex. Dave Goss established the team in 1973.

From 1984 to 1999 the club was known as the Worthing Bears and was based in the town of Worthing, 12 miles west of Brighton. The Bears played in the top-flight British Basketball League (BBL) until 2006 when the franchise folded. The final season was notable for the signing of former NBA star Dennis Rodman, who played three games for the Bears. The league's franchise for the Brighton-area, originally put on hold, was intended to be occupied by the Brighton Cougars from the 2008–09 season but the Cougars bid was rejected, with the league favouring rival candidate Worthing Thunder.

In 2021, the Sussex Bears drafted plans for a stadium to revive the Brighton Bears team. In 2025, the Bears and the Thunder teams merged, allowing for teams ranging from Under 12 to Division One.

== Season-by-season records ==
| Season | Div. | Pos. | Pld. | W | L | Pts. | Play-offs | Cup | Trophy |
|---|---|---|---|---|---|---|---|---|---|
Worthing Bears
| 1990–1991 | BBL | 7th | 24 | 10 | 14 | 20 | Quarter-final | Quarter-final | 1st round |
| 1991–1992 | BBL | 3rd | 30 | 22 | 8 | 44 | Semi-final | Semi-final | 1st round |
| 1992–1993 | BBL | 1st | 33 | 31 | 2 | 62 | Winners | Runner-up | 1st round |
| 1993–1994 | BBL | 2nd | 36 | 30 | 6 | 60 | Winners | Winners | Semi-final |
| 1994–1995 | BBL | 7th | 36 | 20 | 16 | 40 | Winners | 4th round | Semi-final |
| 1995–1996 | BBL | 7th | 36 | 19 | 17 | 38 | Quarter-final | 4th round | Runner-up |
| 1996–1997 | BBL | 11th | 36 | 12 | 24 | 24 | DNQ | 4th round | Quarter-final |
| 1997–1998 | BBL | 12th | 36 | 7 | 29 | 14 | DNQ | 4th round | 1st round |
| 1998–1999 | BBL | 13th | 36 | 4 | 32 | 8 | DNQ | 1st round | 1st round |
Brighton Bears
| 1999–2000 | BBL S | 6th | 34 | 11 | 23 | 22 | DNQ | Quarter-final | 1st round |
| 2000–2001 | BBL S | 6th | 34 | 9 | 25 | 18 | DNQ | 1st round | 1st round |
| 2001–2002 | BBL S | 2nd | 32 | 21 | 11 | 42 | Semi-final | 1st round | Quarter-final |
| 2002–2003 | BBL | 2nd | 40 | 30 | 10 | 60 | Runner-up | Winners | 1st round |
| 2003–2004 | BBL | 1st | 36 | 30 | 6 | 60 | Semi-final | 1st round | Runner-up |
| 2004–2005 | BBL | 5th | 40 | 22 | 18 | 44 | Quarter-final | Winners | Runner-up |
| 2005–2006 | BBL | 8th | 40 | 17 | 23 | 33 | Quarter-final | 1st round | 1st round |

Notes:

- From 1999 to 2002, the BBL operated a Conference system. Brighton competed in the Southern Conference.
- DNQ denotes Did not qualify.

== Trophies ==
=== League ===
- NBL Division One Winners: 1987/88 1
- BBL Championship Winners: 1992/93, & 2003/04 2
- BBL Championship Runners Up: 1993/94, & 2002/03 2
- BBL Southern Conference Runners Up: 2001/02, & 2002/03 2

=== Playoffs ===
- NBL Division One Play Off Winners: 1987/88 1
- BBL Championship Play Off Winners: 1992/93, 1993/94, & 1994/95 3
- BBL Championship Play Off Runners Up: 2002/03 1

=== Trophy ===
- BBL Trophy Runners Up: 1995/96, 2002/03 & 2003/04 3

=== Cup ===
- National Cup Winners: 1993/94, & 2002/03 2
- National Cup Runners Up: 1992/93 1
- BBL Cup Winners: 2004/05 1

== Sources ==
- "Basketball: Happy birthday to Bears pioneer". The Argus. 2 January 2003. Archived from the original on 31 August 2026.
- Bullmore, Harry (5 April 2021). "Plans to bring Brighton Bears back with Black Rock stadium". The Argus. Archived from the original on 6 April 2021.
- Panons, Jacob (18 May 2025). "'Basketball merger could be massive for Sussex'". BBC News. Archived from the original on 18 May 2025.
- Tansley, Eduardo (15 January 2026). "When Dennis Rodman played for Brighton Bears: 'We're in England. It's another world'". The Athletic. The New York Times. Archived from the original on 17 January 2026.
