= List of Leicester Riders seasons =

The Leicester Riders are a professional basketball team that plays in the Super League Basketball (SBL). Previously, the team was also known as Loughborough All-Stars, Leicester All-Stars and the Leicester City Riders.

Since the 1987–88 season, Leicester plays in the top-tier level SLB.

== Seasons ==
Season	Div.	Pos.	Pld.	W	L	Pts.	Play-offs	Trophy	Cup
Loughborough All-Stars
1972–1973	NBL	4th	10	5	5	15	N/A	N/A	1st round
1973–1974	NBL	6th	14	5	9	19	N/A	N/A	Semi-final
1974–1975	NBL	7th	18	8	10	26	N/A	N/A	Semi-final
1975–1976	NBL 1	6th	18	6	12	24	N/A	N/A	Quarter-final
1976–1977	NBL 1	6th	18	8	10	26	N/A	N/A	Quarter-final
1977–1978	NBL 1	5th	18	9	9	18	N/A	N/A	Quarter-final
1978–1979	NBL 1	6th	20	10	10	18	DNQ	N/A	Quarter-final
1979–1980		Hiatus	-	-	-	-	-	-	-
1980–1981		Hiatus	-	-	-	-	-	-	-
Leicester All-Stars
1981–1982	NBL 2	1st	16	16	0	32	DNQ	N/A	Semi-final
1982–1983	NBL 1	6th	24	16	8	32	DNQ	N/A	Quarter-final
1983–1984	NBL 1	6th	36	23	13	45	DNQ	N/A	Runner-up
1984–1985	NBL 1	6th	26	15	11	30	Semi-final	N/A	Quarter-final
1985–1986	NBL 1	8th	28	14	14	28	Semi-final	N/A	2nd round
Leicester City Riders
1986–1987	NBL 1	5th	24	16	8	32	Quarter-final	N/A	2nd round
1987–1988	BBL	9th	28	14	14	28	DNQ	1st round	Semi-final
1988–1989	BBL	4h	20	14	6	28	Semi-final	Semi-final	2nd round
1989–1990	BBL	6th	28	7	21	14	DNQ	1st round	2nd round
1990–1991	BBL	4th	24	14	10	28	Semi-final	Semi-final	Runner-up
1991–1992	BBL	6th	30	14	16	28	Quarter-final	Runner-up	Semi-final
1992–1993	BBL	8th	33	12	21	24	Quarter-final	Semi-final	Semi-final
1993–1994	BBL	7th	36	20	16	40	Quarter-final	Semi-final	Quarter-final
1994–1995	BBL	11th	36	8	28	16	DNQ	1st round	Quarter-final
1995–1996	BBL	9th	36	11	25	22	DNQ	1st round	4th round
1996–1997	BBL	8th	36	15	21	30	Quarter-final	Semi-final	Quarter-final
Leicester Riders
1997–1998	BBL	9th	36	15	21	30	DNQ	Quarter-final	Runner-up
1998–1999	BBL	12th	36	9	27	18	DNQ	Semi-final	1st round
1999–2000	BBL N	7th	36	10	26	20	DNQ	1st round	Quarter-final
2000–2001	BBL N	4th	36	17	19	34	Winners	1st round	Winners
2001–2002	BBL N	5th	32	11	21	22	DNQ	1st round	1st round
2002–2003	BBL	11th	40	3	37	6	DNQ	1st round	1st round
2003–2004	BBL	9th	36	5	31	10	DNQ	1st round	Quarter-final
2004–2005	BBL	10th	40	11	29	22	DNQ	1st round	1st round
2005–2006	BBL	6th	40	18	22	36	Quarter-final	Runner-up	1st round
2006–2007	BBL	7th	36	13	23	22	Quarter-final	Semi-final	Quarter-final
2007–2008	BBL	10th	33	10	23	20	DNQ	1st round	Quarter-final
2008–2009	BBL	3rd	33	21	12	42	Semi-final	1st round	Quarter-final
2009–2010	BBL	6th	36	21	15	42	Quarter-final	1st round	Semi-final
2010–2011	BBL	8th	33	17	16	34	Quarter-final	Semi-final	Quarter-final
2011–2012	BBL	2nd	30	22	8	44	Runner-up	1st round	Semi-final
2012–2013	BBL	1st	33	30	3	60	Winners	Runner-up	Winners
2013–2014	BBL	4th	33	23	10	46	Semi-final	1st round	Winners
2014–2015	BBL	2nd	36	30	6	60	Quarter-final	Runner-up	Quarter-final
2015–2016	BBL	1st	33	29	4	58	Runner-up	Winners	Runner-up
2016–2017	BBL	1st	33	27	6	54	Winners	Winners	Quarter-final
2017–2018	BBL	1st	33	28	5	56	Winners	Winners	Quarter-final
2018–2019	BBL	2nd	33	24	9	48	Winners	1st round	Quarter-final
2019–2020	BBL	4th	12	8	4	16	Cancelled	1st round	Semi-final
2020–2021	BBL	1st	30	24	6	48	Semi-final	1st round	Semi-final
2021–2022	BBL	1st	27	25	2	50	Winners	1st round	Winners
2022–2023	BBL	2nd	36	25	11	50	Runner-up	Quarter-final	Runner-up
2023–2024	BBL	5th	36	18	18	36	Quarter-final	Semi-final	Discontinued
2024–2025	SBL	2nd	32	23	9	46	Winners	Semi-final	Semi-final

Notes:

- From 1999 to 2002 the BBL operated a Conference system. Leicester competed in the Northern Conference.
- DNQ denotes Did not qualify.
