= 1981–82 National Basketball League season =

- League: National Basketball League
- Sport: Basketball
- Teams: 12

Roll of Honour
- National League champions: Crystal Palace
- National League runners-up: Solent Stars
- Playoffs champions: Crystal Palace
- Playoffs runners-up: Sunderland Saints
- National Cup champions: Solent Stars
- National Cup runners-up: John Carr Doncaster

National Basketball League seasons
- 1980–81 1982–83

The 1981–82 Just Juice National Basketball League season was the tenth season of the National Basketball League formed in 1972.

The league was sponsored by Just Juice and Crystal Palace once again secured a double (League and Play Off's) but the Solent Stars easily won the National Cup.

== Team changes ==
Three new teams were entered into the expanded 12 team first division. The three top teams from the previous season's second division; the Solent Stars, TCB Brighton and Liverpool were all admitted and Stockport Belgrade took the decision to move away from their fan base to the new Spectrum Arena in Warrington becoming Birchwood Warrington Vikings. Blackpool Pacemakers dropped out.

== League standings ==
=== First Division ===
Pos	Team	P	W	L	F	A	Pts
1	Crystal Palace	22	20	2	2111	1776	40
2	Solent Stars	22	19	3	2466	2014	38
3	Sunderland Saints	22	16	6	2107	1961	32
4	John Carr Doncaster	22	16	6	2140	1941	32
5	Birmingham Team Fiat	22	15	7	2024	1901	30
6	Hemel Hempstead Ovaltine	22	12	10	2176	2104	24
7	Club Cantabrica Kingston	22	7	15	2120	2374	14
8	Birchwood Warrington Vikings	22	6	16	1824	1926	12
9	Liverpool	22	6	16	2072	2251	12
10	Team Talbot, Guildford Pirates	22	6	16	1811	2005	12
11	Manchester Giants	22	5	17	2164	2372	10
12	TCB Brighton	22	4	18	2084	2438	8

=== Second Division ===
Pos	Team	P	W	L	F	A	Pts
1	Leicester All-Stars	16	16	0	1744	1254	32
2	West Bromwich Kestrels	16	11	5	1590	1480	22
3	Brunel Uxbridge	16	11	5	1478	1414	22
4	Camden & Hampstead	16	10	6	1497	1547	20
5	Bradford Mythbreakers	16	10	6	1381	1278	20
6	Bolton Wanderers	16	5	11	1432	1524	10
7	Nottingham Knights	16	4	12	1233	1471	8
8	Travelodge Milton Keynes	16	3	13	1406	1604	6
9	Colchester	16	2	14	1338	1627	4

== Just Juice playoffs ==
=== Semi-finals ===
venue & date	Team 1	Team 2	Score
March 12, Wembley Arena	Sunderland Saints	Solent Stars	99-93
March 12, Wembley Arena	Crystal Palace	John Carr Doncaster	89-68

=== Final ===
13 March

Crystal Palace	111–86	Sunderland Saints
Pts: Bob Roma 23, Dan Lloyd 20, Pete Jeremich 19, Paul Stimpson 18, Alton Byrd 14, Mick Bett 5, Harley 5, Richard Rudd 3, Kolton Lee 2, Trevor Anderson 2		Pts: Vince Brookins 31, David Lloyd 23, Martin Hall 13, Ken Nottage 7, James McCauley 6, Ron Cornelius 4, Steve Hoffman 2

Wembley Arena
Attendance: 9,000

== Asda National Cup ==
=== Second round ===
Team 1	Team 2	Score
Hemel Hempstead Ovaltine	Club Cantabrica Kingston	96-81
Crystal Palace	Colchester	133-54
Sunderland Saints	Milton Keynes	133-74
Bradford Mythbreakers	John Carr Doncaster	61-87
Solent Stars	Birchwood Warrington Vikings	114-94
Manchester Giants	Nottingham	103-83
Liverpool	Leicester All-Stars	92-94
Team Talbot Guildford	Birmingham Team Fiat	69-81

=== Quarter-finals ===
Team 1	Team 2	Score
Leicester All-Stars	Manchester Giants	100-91
Birmingham Team Fiat	Sunderland Saints	86-83
John Carr Doncaster	Ovaltine Hemel Hempstead	95-85
Solent Stars	Crystal Palace	99-93

=== Semi-finals ===
venue & date	Team 1	Team 2	Score
Dec 04, Sheffield	Birmingham Team Fiat	John Carr Doncaster	79-86
Dec 09, Aston Villa Leisure Centre	Solent Stars	Leicester All-Stars	102-76

=== Final ===
24 January 1982

Solent Stars	127–91	John Carr Doncaster
Pts: Mark Saiers 16, Karl Tatham (MVP), Marvin Johnson, Ken Pemberton, Ken Walton, Paul Philp, Nick Burns		Pts: Ian Day 31, Craig Everett, Cliff Bell

Granby Halls, Leicester

== See also ==
- Basketball in England
- British Basketball League
- English Basketball League
- List of English National Basketball League seasons
