= 1986–87 National Basketball League season =

- League: National Basketball League
- Sport: Basketball
- Number of teams: 13

Roll of Honour
- National League champions: Portsmouth
- National League runners-up: Kingston Kings
- Play Off's champions: BCP London
- Play Off's runners-up: Kingston Kings
- National Cup champions: Kingston Kings
- National Cup runners-up: Portsmouth

National Basketball League seasons
- ← 1985–86 1987–88 →

The 1986–87 Carlsberg National Basketball League season was the fifteenth and last season of the National Basketball League formed in 1972.

The league was sponsored by Carlsberg for the third consecutive year. Portsmouth won the first division league title, Kingston Kings claimed the Play Off's & Crystal Palace lifted the National Cup for the seventh time in their history. Team Walsall (formerly Team Sandwell) won the second division. This would be the last National League season because the top English and Scottish teams would breakaway and form the British Basketball League.

== Team changes ==
The first division was reduced to thirteen teams following two mergers. Manchester United and Manchester Giants merged at the end of April 1986 and agreed to take the name Manchester United and play in Stretford. The second merger came four months later at the beginning of September 1986 when Crystal Palace and Brunel Uxbridge & Camden Ducks joined forces with fixtures being split between the Crystal Palace Sports Centre and Brunel University. In between the two mergers the Nissan Worthing Bears and Tyneside Basketball Club both folded. The EBBA admitted two new teams in the form of Calderdale Explorers and Derby Rams from the second division.

== Carlsberg League standings ==
=== First Division ===
Pos	Team	P	W	L	F	A	Pts
1	HFS Portsmouth	24	21	3	2393	2089	42
2	Team Polycell Kingston Kings	24	21	3	2530	2158	42
3	Sharp Manchester United	24	19	5	2282	2010	38
4	Brunel Crystal Palace London	24	17	7	2311	2151	34
5	Leicester Riders	24	16	8	2438	2340	32
6	Happy Eater Bracknell Pirates	24	11	13	2264	2303	22
7	Calderdale Explorers	24	10	14	2180	2216	20
8	Alphaprint Hemel Hempstead Watford Royals	23	8	15	2281	2341	16
9	Birmingham Bullets	24	8	16	2167	2227	16
10	Reg Vardy Sunderland 76'ers	24	7	17	2246	2448	14
11	Draper Tools Solent Stars	24	7	17	2245	2431	14
12	Home Spare Bolton & Bury Hawks *	23	6	17	1944	2199	11
13	BPCC Derby Rams	24	4	20	2056	2424	8

- Hemel v Bolton fixture not played and Bolton were deducted one point

=== Second Division ===
Pos	Team	P	W	L	F	A	Pts
1	Team Walsall	18	15	3	1907	1647	30
2	Oldham Celtics	18	15	3	2071	1575	30
3	Just Rentals Rhondda	18	14	4	2205	1954	28
4	CBS Centurions Colchester	18	12	6	1721	1705	24
5	Lambeth TopCats	18	11	7	1689	1622	22
6	TF Group Cleveland Comets	18	10	8	1793	1828	20
7	Tower Hamlets	18	5	13	1670	1779	10
8	Plymouth Raiders	18	4	14	1731	1844	8
9	Swindon Rakers	18	3	15	1555	2010	6
10	Ellesmere Port Jets	18	1	17	1610	1988	2

== Carlsberg playoffs ==
=== Quarter-finals ===
Team 1	Team 2	Score
Portsmouth	Hemel Hempstead Watford Royal	2-0
Kingston Kings	Calderdale Explorers	2-1
Manchester United	Bracknell Pirates	2-1
Brunel Crystal Palace London	Leicester Riders	2-1

=== Semi-finals ===
venue & date	Team 1	Team 2	Score
Apr 03, Wembley Arena	Portsmouth	Brunel Crystal Palace London	102-106
Apr 03, Wembley Arena	Kingston Kings	Manchester United	111-80

=== Third Place ===
venue & date	Team 1	Team 2	Score
Apr 04, Wembley Arena	Portsmouth	Manchester United	99-89

=== Final ===
4 April 1987

BCP London	96–82	Kingston Kings
Pts: Julio Politi (MVP) 28, Dale Roberts 22, Brian Kellybrew 17, Mickey Bett 16, Paul Stimpson 12		Pts: Danny Davis 18, Martin Clark 15, Steve Bontrager 13, Colin McNish 12, Kenny Scott 11, Doug Lloyd 11

Wembley Arena
Attendance: ?
BCP London Coach David Last
Kingston Coach Kevin Cadle

== Prudential National Cup ==
=== Second round ===
Team 1	Team 2	Score
Derby Rams	Brunel Crystal Palace	73-90
Tower Hamlets	Hemel Hempstead Watford Royals	95-117
Oldham Celtics	Calderdale Explorers	95-115
Portsmouth	Lambeth Topcats	121-81
Plymouth Raiders	Solent Stars	
Bracknell Pirates		
Manchester United	Leicester Riders	113-111
Kingston Kings	TF Group Cleveland	122-64

=== Quarter-finals ===
Team 1	Team 2	Score
Hemel Hempstead Watford Royals	Portsmouth	99-127
Brunel Crystal Palace	Calderdale Explorers	81-94
Solent Stars	Manchester United	85-88
Kingston Kings	Bracknell Pirates	113-102

=== Semi-finals ===
Venue & Date	Team 1	Team 2	Score
Aston Villa Leisure Centre, Nov 30	Calderdale Explorers	Portsmouth	77-81
Aston Villa Leisure Centre, Nov 30	Kingston Kings	Manchester United	95-86

=== Final ===
Live Channel 4

15 December 1986

Kingston Kings	95–87	Portsmouth
Pts: Danny Davis 21, Colin McNish 20, Doug Lloyd 14, Kenny Scott 14, Steve Bontrager 14, Martin Clark 10		Pts: Alan Cunningham 20, Danny Williams 18, Mike Spaid 16 Karl Tatham 14, Joel Moore 13, Steve Nelson 4

Royal Albert Hall, London
Attendance: 4,500
Kingston Coach Kevin Cadle
Portsmouth Coach Dan Lloyd

== British Masters Cup ==
31 March 1987

Kingston Kings	103–82	Murray International Metals Livingston
Pts: Steve Bontrager 26, Kenny Scott 20, Martin Clark 17, Danny Davis 16, Andy Innell 12, Doug Lloyd 8, Colin McNish 4		Pts: Sam Foggin 21, Ralton Way 20, Graeme Hill 15, Lewis Young 12, Bobby Archibald 10, Derek Frame 4

Aston Villa Leisure Centre
Attendance: ?
Kingston Coach Kevin Cadle
Livingston Coach ?

== See also ==
- Basketball in England
- British Basketball League
- English Basketball League
- List of English National Basketball League seasons
