= 1982–83 National Basketball League season =

- League: National Basketball League
- Sport: Basketball
- Number of teams: 13

Roll of Honour
- National League champions: Crystal Palace Supersonics
- National League runners-up: Sunderland
- Play Off's champions: Sunderland
- Play Off's runners-up: Crystal Palace Supersonics
- National Cup champions: Solent Stars
- National Cup runners-up: Birmingham Barrett Bullets

National Basketball League seasons
- ← 1981–82 1983–84 →

The 1982–83 Just Juice National Basketball League season was the eleventh season of the National Basketball League formed in 1972.

The league was sponsored by Just Juice for the second consecutive year and Crystal Palace won yet another league title but Sunderland claimed the Play Off's and the Solent Stars successfully defended their National Cup crown.
The league received a welcome boost when a new national TV channel called Channel 4 decided to show live action every Monday evening.

== Team changes ==
Leicester returned to top tier action as the one new team admitted to the expanded 13 team first division which retained the previous twelve members. Team Talbot, Guildford Pirates moved to Bracknell and became the Bracknell Pirates. Sunderland Saints became Sunderland Maestros towards the end of the season following a new two year sponsorship deal with a North East car dealer.
The leagues most famous player Alton Byrd left Crystal Palace to join Murray International Edinburgh.

== League standings ==
=== First Division ===
| Pos | Team | P | W | L | F | A | Pts |
|---|---|---|---|---|---|---|---|
| 1 | Crystal Palace Supersonics | 24 | 21 | 3 | 2083 | 1850 | 42 |
| 2 | Sunderland Saints/Maestros | 24 | 18 | 6 | 2323 | 2024 | 36 |
| 3 | Ovaltine Hemel Hempstead | 24 | 18 | 6 | 2169 | 1938 | 36 |
| 4 | Birmingham Barrett Bullets | 24 | 17 | 7 | 2465 | 2226 | 34 |
| 5 | Solent Stars | 24 | 16 | 8 | 2383 | 2068 | 32 |
| 6 | Planters Leicester | 24 | 16 | 8 | 2176 | 1972 | 32 |
| 7 | TCB Brighton Bears | 24 | 13 | 11 | 2216 | 2207 | 26 |
| 8 | John Carr Doncaster | 24 | 12 | 12 | 2115 | 2129 | 24 |
| 9 | Club Cantabrica Kingston | 24 | 10 | 14 | 2033 | 2057 | 20 |
| 10 | Warrington Lada Vikings | 24 | 7 | 17 | 1971 | 2115 | 14 |
| 11 | Manchester Giants | 24 | 4 | 20 | 2038 | 2464 | 8 |
| 12 | Bracknell Pirates | 24 | 3 | 21 | 1988 | 2335 | 6 |
| 13 | Wakewood Liverpool | 24 | 1 | 23 | 1889 | 2464 | 2 |

=== Second Division ===
| Pos | Team | P | W | L | F | A | Pts |
|---|---|---|---|---|---|---|---|
| 1 | Fine Ceramics Bolton | 22 | 21 | 1 | 2157 | 1693 | 42 |
| 2 | West Bromwich | 22 | 20 | 2 | 2600 | 1818 | 40 |
| 3 | Team Telecom Colchester | 22 | 17 | 5 | 1835 | 1621 | 34 |
| 4 | Newcastle | 22 | 12 | 10 | 2064 | 1980 | 24 |
| 5 | Crestol Halifax Hawks | 22 | 11 | 11 | 2014 | 1896 | 22 |
| 6 | Brunel Uxbridge Ducks | 22 | 11 | 11 | 2050 | 1882 | 22 |
| 7 | McEwan Gateshead | 22 | 11 | 11 | 1873 | 1870 | 22 |
| 8 | Watford Royals | 22 | 8 | 14 | 1846 | 2059 | 16 |
| 9 | Ashfield Glass Nottingham | 22 | 8 | 14 | 1868 | 2028 | 16 |
| 10 | Bradford Mythbreakers | 22 | 6 | 16 | 2005 | 2169 | 12 |
| 11 | Camden & Hampstead | 22 | 5 | 17 | 1792 | 1984 | 10 |
| 12 | Milton Keynes | 22 | 2 | 20 | 1526 | 2630 | 4 |

== Just Juice playoffs ==
=== Semi-finals ===
| venue & date | Team 1 | Team 2 | Score |
|---|---|---|---|
| March 18, Wembley Arena | Sunderland Saints/Maestros | Ovaltine Hemel Hempstead | 76-74 |
| March 18, Wembley Arena | Crystal Palace Supersonics | Birmingham Barrett Bullets | 72-67 |

=== Final ===
Paul Stimpson landed a basket for the Crystal Palace Supersonics which was adjudged to be just after the buzzer. It would have won the game for Palace but the game went into overtime and Sunderland won an incredible match.

19 March

| Sunderland Maestros | 75–74 aet | Crystal Palace Supersonics |
| Pts: Art Wearren 29, James McCauley 16, Jim Brandon 16, Ken Nottage, Clive Hartley | | Pts: Greg McCray 20, Dave Shutts 16, Pete Jeremich 12, Dan Lloyd 12, Paul Stimpson 10 |

Wembley Arena
Attendance: 9,000
Sunderland Coach Tom Becker
Palace Coach Danny Palmer

== Asda National Cup ==
=== Second round ===
| Team 1 | Team 2 | Score |
|---|---|---|
| Fine Ceramics Bolton | Club Cantabrica Kingston | 81-93 |
| Crystal Palace Supersonics | West Bromwich | 98-69 |
| Sunderland Saints | TCB Brighton Bears | 96-90 |
| Planters Leicester | John Carr Doncaster | 71-57 |
| Solent Stars | Crestol Halifax Hawks | 130-66 |
| Camden & Hampstead | McEwan Gateshead | 83-72 |
| Bradford Mythbreakers | Birmingham Barrett Bullets | 69-134 |

=== Quarter-finals ===
| Team 1 | Team 2 | Score |
|---|---|---|
| Birmingham Barrett Bullets | Planters Leicester | 89-87 |
| Club Cantabrica Kingston | Sunderland Saints | 97-88 |
| Ovaltine Hemel Hempstead | Crystal Palace Supersonics | 81-84 |
| Camden & Hampstead | Solent Stars | 58-119 |

=== Semi-finals ===
| Leg | Team 1 | Team 2 | Score |
|---|---|---|---|
| First Leg | Crystal Palace Supersonics | Solent Stars | 92-84 |
| Second Leg | Solent Stars | Crystal Palace Supersonics | 83-65 |
| First Leg | Club Cantabrica Kingston | Birmingham Barrett Bullets | 70-83 |
| Second Leg | Birmingham Barrett Bullets | Club Cantabrica Kingston | 80-86 |

=== Final ===
Birmingham's Russ Saunders an imported American scored a record 43 points in a final but still found himself on the losing side.

Live on Channel 4

24 January 1983

| Solent Stars | 98–97 | Birmingham Barrett Bullets |
| Pts: TJ Robinson 33, Tony Walton 29, Mark Saiers 12, Karl Tatham 12, Paul Philp 4, Ken Watson 4, Roy Lewis 4 | | Pts: Russ Saunders 43, Greg White 22, Dip Donaldson 11 |

Granby Halls, Leicester
Attendance: ?
Solent Coach Steve Fitzsimmons
Birmingham Coach Greg White

== See also ==
- Basketball in England
- British Basketball League
- English Basketball League
- List of English National Basketball League seasons
