= 1985–86 National Basketball League season =

- League: National Basketball League
- Sport: Basketball
- Number of teams: 15

Roll of Honour
- National League champions: Manchester United
- National League runners-up: Kingston Kings
- Playoffs champions: Kingston Kings
- Playoffs runners-up: Birmingham Bullets
- National Cup champions: Kingston Kings
- National Cup runners-up: Solent Stars

National Basketball League seasons
- ← 1984–85 1986–87 →

The 1985–86 Carlsberg National Basketball League season was the fourteenth season of the National Basketball League formed in 1972.

The league was sponsored by Carlsberg for the second consecutive year and the Kingston Kings completed a Play Off's & National Cup double but Manchester United won the League title.

== Team changes ==
The EBBA increased the first division to fifteen teams adding two clubs from the second division; the two new teams were Brunel Uxbridge & Camden Ducks and the Tyneside basketball club. One club dropped out because Doncaster Panthers suffered financial trouble and were disbanded during the previous summer.
The gap in spending capability between certain teams seemed to be growing with the likes of Kingston, Manchester United and Portsmouth having much larger budgets than some of their competitors.

== Carlsberg League standings ==
=== First Division ===
Pos	Team	P	W	L	F	A	Pts
1	Sharp Manchester United	28	25	3	2772	2464	50
2	Team Polycell Kingston Kings	28	24	4	3193	2902	48
3	Portsmouth	28	22	6	2721	2513	44
4	Manchester Giants	28	18	10	2565	2456	36
5	London Docklands Crystal Palace *	28	17	11	3237	3050	33
6	Birmingham Bullets	28	15	13	2759	2720	30
7	Brunel Uxbridge & Camden Ducks	28	14	14	2586	2629	28
8	Walkers Crisps Leicester	28	14	14	2907	2957	28
9	Hemel Hempstead Watford Royals	28	13	15	2864	2790	26
10	Sperrings Solent Stars	28	12	16	2595	2568	24
11	Nissan Worthing Bears	28	12	16	0000	0000	24
12	Bracknell Pirates	28	11	17	2907	2985	22
13	QRS Sunderland	28	8	20	2734	2967	16
14	Home Spare Bolton & Bury Hawks	28	3	25	2678	3018	6
15	McEwan Tyneside	28	2	26	2542	2884	4

One point deducted *

=== Second Division ===
Pos	Team	P	W	L	F	A	Pts
1	Calderdale Explorers	22	18	4	2511	1963	36
2	BPCC Derby Rams	22	18	4	2204	1923	36
3	Team Wakefields Nottingham	22	18	4	2181	1954	36
4	Brixton TopCats	22	15	7	1960	1752	30
5	CAD Tower Hamlets	22	14	8	2043	1920	28
6	ANC Liverpool	22	12	10	2057	1962	24
7	Oldham Ioanian Celtics	22	11	11	2163	2090	22
8	Plymouth Raiders	22	11	11	2062	2051	22
9	English Estates Cleveland	22	6	16	2022	2219	12
10	Team Telecom Colchester	22	5	17	1918	2210	10
11	Swindon Rakers	22	4	18	1859	2185	8
12	Peterborough Jets	22	0	22	1623	2374	0

== Carlsberg playoffs ==
=== Quarter-finals ===
Team 1	Team 2	Score
Leicester	Manchester United	2-1
Kingston	Brunel Uxbridge & Camden	2-0
Manchester Giants	Crystal Palace	1-2
Birmingham Bullets	Portsmouth	2-1

=== Semi-finals ===
venue & date	Team 1	Team 2	Score
March 21, Wembley Arena	Birmingham Bullets	Crystal Palace	
March 21, Wembley Arena	Kingston Kings	Leicester	

=== Third Place ===
venue & date	Team 1	Team 2	Score
March 22, Wembley Arena	Crystal Palace	Leicester	136-117

=== Final ===
22 March 1986

Kingston Kings	114–97	Birmingham Bullets
Pts: Danny Davis (MVP) 37, Steve Bontrager 30, Martin Clark 30		Pts: Dip Donaldson 31, Butch Hays 26, Tyrone Shoulders 22

Wembley Arena
Attendance: ?
Kingston Coach Malcolm Chamberlain
Birmingham Coach Art Ross/Colin Wood

== Prudential National Cup ==
=== Second round ===
Team 1	Team 2	Score
Walkers Crisps Leicester	QRS Sunderland	105-113
CAD Tower Hamlets	Portsmouth	69-111
McEwan Tyneside	Oldham Celtics	111-98
Calderdale Explorers	Sharp Manchester United	70-97
Sperrings Solent Stars	Happy Eater Bracknell Pirates	111-97
Nissan Worthing Bears	Plymouth Raiders	107-85
Home Spare Bolton & Bury Hawks	Manchester Giants	76-95
Team Polycell Kingston Kings	Hemel Hempstead & Watford Royals	132-113

=== Quarter-finals ===
Team 1	Team 2	Score
McEwan Tyneside	Portsmouth	76-98
Nissan Worthing Bears	Manchester Giants	87-82
Sperrings Solent Stars	QRS Sunderland	106-83
Sharp Manchester United	Team Polycell Kingston Kings	84-98

=== Semi-finals ===
Venue & Date	Team 1	Team 2	Score
Aston Villa Leisure Centre, Dec 15	Sperrings Solent Stars	Nissan Worthing Bears	101-83
Aston Villa Leisure Centre, Dec 15	Team Polycell Kingston Kings	Portsmouth	92-75

=== Final ===
Live on Channel 4

13 January 1985

Kingston Kings	113–82	Solent Stars
Pts: Steve Bontrager 33, Danny Davis (MVP) 28, Martin Clark 27, Andy Innell, Chrimes		Pts: TJ Robinson 28, Bryan Skoech 15, Ron Whitehead 14, Ken Nottage

Royal Albert Hall, London
Attendance: ?
Kingston Coach Malcolm Chamberlain
Solent Coach Steve Fitzsimons

== British Masters Cup final ==
9 April 1986

Birmingham Bullets	87–83	Murray International Metals Edinburgh
Pts: Butch Hays 26, Tyrone Shoulders 22, Dip Donaldson 19, Neville Hopkins		Pts: Sam Foggin 33, Stewart 14, Alton Byrd 13

Gateshead
Attendance: ?
Birmingham Coach Art Ross/Colin Wood
Edinburgh Coach ?

== See also ==
- Basketball in England
- British Basketball League
- English Basketball League
- List of English National Basketball League seasons
