= 1980–81 National Basketball League season =

- League: National Basketball League
- Sport: Basketball
- Number of teams: 10

Roll of Honour
- National League champions: Birmingham Team Fiat
- National League runners-up: Crystal Palace
- Play Off's champions: Sunderland Saints
- Play Off's runners-up: Crystal Palace
- National Cup champions: Crystal Palace
- National Cup runners-up: John Carr Doncaster

National Basketball League seasons
- ← 1979–80 1981–82 →

The 1980–81 Rotary Watches National Basketball League season was the ninth season of the National Basketball League.

The league was sponsored by Rotary Watches for the third consecutive year and Birmingham Team Fiat broke the Crystal Palace monopoly by taking the league title. Sunderland provided a major shock when securing the Play Offs title. Palace, who were expected to make a clean sweep of silverware, gained some consolation by winning the National Cup.

== Team changes ==
Coventry Team Fiat were rebranded Birmingham and moved to a larger venue at the Aston Villa Leisure Centre which served as a catalyst for their success. Manchester took on the name Trafford for the season but apart from this the teams remained the same. A team called Solent Stars backed by a millionaire businessman called Harry Smith easily won the second division and competed successfully against first division teams in tournaments.

== National League ==
=== First Division ===
Pos	Team	P	W	L	F	A	Pts
1	Birmingham Team Fiat	18	17	1	1748	1530	34
2	Crystal Palace	18	16	2	1787	1467	32
3	Hemel Hempstead Ovaltine	18	13	5	1725	1498	26
4	Sunderland Saints	18	11	7	1633	1490	22
5	John Carr Doncaster	18	9	9	1549	1441	20
6	Stockport Belgrade	18	7	11	1510	1638	14
7	Trafford Giants	18	6	12	1418	1563	12
8	Kelly Girls International Kingston	18	5	13	1546	1680	10
9	Team Talbot, Guildford Pirates	18	4	14	1470	1730	8
10	Blackpool Pacemakers	18	2	16	1386	1735	6

=== Second Division ===
Pos	Team	P	W	L	F	A	Pts
1	Solent Stars	16	15	1	1824	1221	30
2	Brighton Bears	16	13	3	1654	1426	26
3	Liverpool	16	11	5	1731	1241	22
4	National Breakdown Leeds	16	11	5	1448	1303	22
5	Camden & Hampstead	16	8	8	1457	1468	16
6	Nottingham	16	5	11	1266	1430	10
7	Brunel Uxbridge	16	5	11	1258	1481	10
8	Colchester Moels	16	2	14	1201	1592	4
9	Hemeling Wolverhampton	16	2	14	1272	1779	4

== Rotary Watches playoffs ==
=== Semi-finals ===
venue & date	Team 1	Team 2	Score
March 13, Wembley Arena	Birmingham Team Fiat	Sunderland Saints	73-80
March 13, Wembley Arena	Crystal Palace	Hemel Hempstead Ovaltine	88-86

=== Final ===
14 March

Sunderland Saints	96–92	Crystal Palace
Pts: David Lloyd ??, Gregg Bunch ??, James McCauley ??		Pts: Dan Lloyd ??, Bob Roma ??, Clive Hartley ??, Alton Byrd ??

Wembley Arena

== Asda National Cup ==
=== First round ===
Team 1	Team 2	Score
Hemel Hempstead Ovaltine	Crystal Palace	83-97
Stockport Belgrade	National Breakdown Leeds	78-80
Sunderland Saints	Liverpool	103-78
John Carr Doncaster	Trafford Giants	88-87 aet
Brighton Bears	Solent Stars	105-129
Nottingham	Birmingham Team Fiat	69-105
Brunel Uxbridge	KGI Kingston	74-118
Colchester Moles	Team Talbot Guildford	77-104

=== Quarter-finals ===
Team 1	Team 2	Score
KGI Kingston	Crystal Palace	70-81
National Breakdown Leeds	Sunderland Saints	71-82
Team Talbot Guildford	John Carr Doncaster	71-83
Solent Stars	Birmingham Team Fiat	98-101

=== Semi-finals ===
venue & date	Team 1	Team 2	Score
Dec 05, Bradford	John Carr Doncaster	Sunderland Saints	73-68
Dec 12, Bletchley	Crystal Palace	Birmingham Team Fiat	94-73

=== Final ===
23 January 1981

Crystal Palace	91–74	John Carr Doncaster
Pts: Bob Roma 24, Clive Hartley 19, Alton Byrd 16, Dan Lloyd 10, Paul Stimpson 8, Richard Rudd 6, Pete Jeremich 6, Kolton Lee 2		Pts: Cliff Bell 20, Danny Randall 17, Paul Richards 16, Steve O'Shea 11, Ian Day 6, Chris Bycroft 4

Coventry Sports Centre

== See also ==
- Basketball in England
- British Basketball League
- English Basketball League
- List of English National Basketball League seasons
