= 1983–84 National Basketball League season =

- League: National Basketball League
- Sport: Basketball
- Number of teams: 13

Roll of Honour
- National League champions: Solent Stars
- National League runners-up: Crystal Palace
- Playoffs champions: Solent Stars
- Playoffs runners-up: Warrington & Liverpool
- National Cup champions: Solent Stars
- National Cup runners-up: Leicester

National Basketball League seasons
- ← 1982–83 1984–85 →

The 1983–84 Wimpey Homes National Basketball League season was the twelfth season of the National Basketball League formed in the United Kingdom in 1972.

The league was sponsored by Wimpey Homes and Solent Stars achieved a clean sweep of National League, Play Offs and National Cup. Teams played each other three times in the league during the season. The Channel 4 exposure had assisted in teams finding sponsors but a decision by the Independent Broadcasting Authority to ban shirt advertising suddenly jeopardised these sponsorships.

== Team changes ==
There had been no plans by the English Basketball Association (EBBA) to allow any new teams into the first division and this upset the Fine Ceramics Bolton team that had won the second division the year before. No invite had been extended to either them or Liverpool who had finished bottom of the first division. However it transpired that Bolton were eventually allowed to compete, a decision which then angered Liverpool but maintained a 13 team league. Liverpool then made the decision to merge with Warrington.
Remarkably 11 of the 13 clubs made a new coaching appointment. The appointments were Randy Haefner (Sunderland), Rick Taylor (Hemel Hempstead), Jim Guymon (Kingston), Jim Kelly (Solent), Bill Sheridan (Brighton), Bob Mitchell (Birmingham), Joel Furnari (Leicester), Joe Whelton (Liverpool/Warrington), Tom Becker (Manchester), Jack Lehane (Bracknell), and Craig Lynch (Bolton).

== League standings ==
=== First Division ===
Pos	Team	P	W	L	F	A	Pts
1	Sperrings Solent Stars	36	32	4	3403	2261	64
2	Blue Nun Crystal Palace Supersonics	36	25	11	2973	2750	50
3	FSO Cars Warrington & Liverpool Vikings	36	24	12	2967	2789	48
4	Bracknell Pirates	36	23	13	3144	3037	46
5	Austin Rover Sunderland	36	23	13	3243	2973	46
6	Planters Leicester	36	23	13	2669	2784	45*
7	Manchester Giants	36	18	18	3053	3129	36
8	Brighton Bears	36	17	19	3089	3152	34
9	Davenports Birmingham	36	16	20	3315	3365	32
10	Kingcraft Kingston	36	14	22	3179	3197	28
11	Ovaltine Hemel Hempstead	36	12	24	3355	3508	24
12	John Carr Doncaster	36	6	30	2992	3464	12
13	Fine Ceramics Bolton	36	1	35	3088	3663	2

One point deducted*

=== Second Division ===
Pos	Team	P	W	L	F	A	Pts
1	Team Sandwell	24	23	1	2568	2124	46
2	Clayton Glass Newcastle	24	19	5	2410	2075	38
3	Gateshead	24	19	5	2223	1936	38
4	Calderdale Explorers	24	16	8	2222	2091	32
5	Uxbridge Ducks	24	15	9	2225	2112	30
6	Colchester	24	12	12	2058	2039	23*
7	Bradford Mythbreakers	24	11	13	2240	2198	22
8	Camden & Hampstead	24	10	14	2009	2105	20
9	Merseyside Mustangs	24	10	14	2144	2239	20
10	Plymouth Raiders	24	6	18	2147	2398	12
11	Ashfield Glass Nottingham	24	6	18	2040	2252	12
12	Watford Royals	24	6	18	2215	2423	11*
13	Portsmouth Buccaneers	24	3	21	2013	2522	6

== Wimpey Homes Play Offs ==
=== Semi-finals ===
venue & date	Team 1	Team 2	Score
March 16, Wembley Arena	Solent Stars	Bracknell Pirates	83-81
March 16, Wembley Arena	Crystal Palace Supersonics	Liverpool & Warrington Vikings	68-71

=== Final ===
17 March 1984

Solent Stars	70–64	Liverpool & Warrington Vikings
Pts: John Johnson, TJ Robinson, Mark Saiers, Karl Tatham, Tony Watson		Pts: Will Brown (MVP) 18, Ed Bona, David Lloyd, Jeff Jones, Kevin Penny

Wembley Arena
Attendance: 9,000
Solent Coach Jim Kelly
Liv/Warr Coach Joe Whelton

== Asda National Cup ==
=== Second round ===
Team 1	Team 2	Score
LSO Cars Liverpool & Warrington Vikings	Davenports Birmingham	92-85
Gateshead	Manchester Giants	83-81
Blue Nun Crystal Palace Supersonics	Brighton Bears	97-80
Ovaltine Hemel Hempstead	Brunel Uxbridge Ducks	85-71
Planters Leicester	John Carr Doncaster	91-77
Sperrings Solent Stars	Watford Royals	119-82
Bradford Mythbreakers	Austin Rover Sunderland	72-87
Bracknell Pirates	Kingcraft Kingston	82-89

=== Quarter finals ===
Team 1	Team 2	Score
Planters Leicester	Gateshead	82-67
Austin Rover Sunderland	LSO Cars Liverpool & Warrington Vikings	73-68
Sperrings Solent Stars	Kingcraft Kingston	124-79
Blue Nun Crystal Palace Supersonics	Ovaltine Hemel Hempstead	

=== Semi-finals ===
Leg	Team 1	Team 2	Score
First Leg	Sperrings Solent Stars	Blue Nun Crystal Palace Supersonics	68-56
Second Leg	Blue Nun Crystal Palace Supersonics	Sperrings Solent Stars	73-69
First Leg	Planters Leicester	Austin Rover Sunderland	73-73
Second Leg	Austin Rover Sunderland	Planters Leicester	69-70

=== Final ===
Live on Channel 4

9 January 1984

Solent Stars	86–67	Planters Leicester
Pts: John Johnson 20, TJ Robinson 18, Mark Saiers (MVP) 17		Pts: Charles Payton 22, Ken Pemberton 18, Lonnie Legette 12, Steve O'Shea

Royal Albert Hall, London
Attendance: ?
Solent Coach Jim Kelly
Leicester Coach Joel Furnari

== See also ==
- Basketball in England
- British Basketball League
- English Basketball League
- List of English National Basketball League seasons
