= 1984–85 National Basketball League season =

- League: National Basketball League
- Sport: Basketball
- Teams: 14

Roll of Honour
- National League champions: Kingston Kings
- National League runners-up: Manchester United
- Play Off's champions: Manchester United
- Play Off's runners-up: Kingston Kings
- National Cup champions: Kingston Kings
- National Cup runners-up: Manchester United

National Basketball League seasons
- 1983–84 1985–86

The 1984–85 Carlsberg National Basketball League season was the thirteenth season of the National Basketball League formed in 1972. The league was sponsored by Carlsberg and the Kingston Kings completed a League & Cup double but Manchester United won the newly extended Play Off's.

== Team changes ==
The EBBA increased the first division to fourteen teams which resulted in a 26-match schedule which was warmly welcomed after the 36-match schedule of the previous season. Of the 13 existing teams, Brighton switched to Worthing and with new sponsors would be known as the Nissan Worthing Bears and Hemel Hempstead merged with the second division outfit Watford Royals to form Hemel & Watford Royals. The new fourteenth team was Telford Turbos who secured a new sponsor called Screen Stars.

It was evident that as the season progressed many clubs had been spending beyond their means in recent years and were duly struggling to balance the books. The Solent Stars applied for voluntary liquidation in December 1984 despite leading the league and terminated the contract of their coach Jim Kelly and leading players to save money.
An extraordinary season continued in January 1985 when just a few days before the National Cup final Manchester United F.C. bought the FSO Cars Liverpool & Warrington club, renaming them for the final and relocating to Stretford. The drama continued as Portsmouth F.C. attempted to take over Solent Stars before a former Stars player TJ Robinson headed a consortium to save the club. Portsmouth F.C. then bought Telford Turbos (also in liquidation) and moved the team to Portsmouth.

== Carlsberg League standings ==
=== First Division ===
Pos	Team	P	W	L	F	A	Pts
1	Kingcraft Kingston Kings	26	24	2	2930	2640	48
2	Manchester United +	26	19	7	2330	2077	36
3	Cottrills Manchester Giants	26	18	8	2377	2235	36
4	Solent Stars	26	17	9	2464	2307	34
5	Nissan Worthing Bears	26	17	9	2456	2328	34
6	Walkers Crisps Leicester	26	15	11	2542	2454	30
7	Poundstretcher Hemel Watford Royals	26	15	11	2390	2261	30
8	Bracknell Pirates	26	15	11	2366	2450	24
9	Sunderland Maestros	26	12	14	2410	2405	24
10	Blue Nun Crystal Palace Supersonics	26	12	14	2378	2433	24
11	John Carr Doncaster Panthers	26	10	16	2352	2449	20
12	Davenports Birmingham	26	6	20	2245	2451	12
13	Portsmouth +	26	1	25	2166	2556	2
14	Home Spare Bolton Bees	26	1	25	2422	2782	2

Team changed name mid-season +

=== Second Division ===
Pos	Team	P	W	L	F	A	Pts
1	McEwan Tyneside	22	18	4	1954	1666	36
2	Uxbridge Ducks	22	18	4	1804	1519	36
3	Calderdale Explorers	22	17	5	1955	1726	34
4	John Eld Derby Turbos	22	16	6	1907	1730	32
5	CAD Tower Hamlets	22	14	8	1786	1712	28
6	ANC Liverpool	22	12	10	1780	1746	24
7	Swindon Rakers	22	10	12	1768	1821	20
8	Glucodin Plymouth Raiders	22	9	13	1905	1896	18
9	Team Telecom Colchester	22	7	15	1786	1911	14
10	Camden & Hampstead	22	5	17	1757	1969	10
11	Team Wakefields Nottingham	22	3	19	1729	2012	6
12	Sandwell Mail	22	3	19	1620	2043	6

== Carlsberg playoffs ==
=== Quarter-finals ===
Team 1	Team 2	Score
Kingston Kings	Bracknell Pirates	2-0
Manchester United	Hemel Watford Royals	2-0
Manchester Giants	Leicester	1-2
Solent Stars	Worthing Bears	1-2

=== Semi-finals ===
venue & date	Team 1	Team 2	Score
March 30, Wembley Arena	Manchester United	Worthing Bears	90-84
March 30, Wembley Arena	Kingston Kings	Leicester	118-112

=== Third Place ===
venue & date	Team 1	Team 2	Score
March 31, Wembley Arena	Worthing Bears	Leicester	99-89

=== Final ===
31 March 1985

Manchester United	109–97	Kingston Kings
Pts: Colin Irish 47, Ed Bona 24, Will Brown 14		Pts: Steve Bontrager 28, Johnson 25, Clark 14, Doug Lloyd 12, Davis 10

Wembley Arena
Attendance: 9,000
Manchester Coach Joe Whelton
Kingston Coach Steve Bontrager

== Kellogg's National Cup ==
=== Second round ===
Team 1	Team 2	Score
Swindon Rakers	Sperrings Solent Stars	86-117
Cottrills Manchester Giants	Sandwell Mail	127-81
John Carr Doncaster Panthers	Telford Turbos	84-81
Crystal Palace Supersonics	Camden	93-77
LSO Cars Warrington & Liverpool	McEwan Tyneside	84-70
Glucodin Plymouth Raiders	Nissan Worthing Bears	89-108
Home Spare Bolton Bees	Walkers Crisps Leicester	105-116
Kingcraft Kingston Kings	Hemel Hempstead & Watford Royals	85-84

=== Quarter-finals ===
Team 1	Team 2	Score
LSO Cars Warrington & Liverpool	Sperrings Solent Stars	
Nissan Worthing Bears	John Carr Doncaster Panthers	78-80
Crystal Palace Supersonics	Kingcraft Kingston Kings	84-93
Cottrills Manchester Giants	Walkers Crisps Leicester	105-98

=== Semi-finals ===
Leg	Team 1	Team 2	Score
First Leg	LSO Cars Warrington & Liverpool	John Carr Doncaster Panthers	82-80
Second Leg	John Carr Doncaster Panthers	LSO Cars Warrington & Liverpool	78-95
First Leg	Cottrills Manchester Giants	Kingcraft Kingston Kings	97-98
Second Leg	Kingcraft Kingston Kings	Cottrills Manchester Giants	107-93

=== Final ===
Live on Channel 4

6 January 1985

Kingston Kings	103–98 aet	Manchester United
Pts: Steve Bontrager 37, Martin Clark 26, Danny Davis 16, Doug Lloyd 12, Andy Innell		Pts: Colin Irish 28, Ed Bona 28, Will Brown 17, David Lloyd 14, Kevin Penny

Royal Albert Hall, London
Attendance: ?
Kingston Coach Steve Bontrager
Manchester Coach Joe Whelton

== See also ==
- Basketball in England
- British Basketball League
- English Basketball League
- List of English National Basketball League seasons
