= List of English National Basketball League seasons =

A List of English National Basketball League seasons since the inception of the National Basketball League in 1972 until 1987 when the British basketball League seasons started. List of British Basketball League seasons.

Season	Championship	Play-offs	National Cup	Masters Cup
1972–73	Avenue (Leyton)	Avenue (Leyton)	Avenue (Leyton)	N/A
1973–74	Sutton & Crystal Palace	N/A	Sutton & Crystal Palace	N/A
1974–75	Islington Embassy All-Stars	N/A	Islington Embassy All-Stars	N/A
1975–76	Crystal Palace	N/A	Crystal Palace	N/A
1976–77	Crystal Palace	N/A	Crystal Palace	N/A
1977–78	Crystal Palace	N/A	Crystal Palace	N/A
1978–79	Doncaster Panthers	Crystal Palace	Doncaster Panthers	N/A
1979–80	Crystal Palace	Crystal Palace	Crystal Palace	N/A
1980–81	Birmingham Team Fiat	Sunderland	Crystal Palace	N/A
1981–82	Crystal Palace	Crystal Palace	Solent Stars	N/A
1982–83	Crystal Palace	Sunderland Maestros	Solent Stars	N/A
1983–84	Solent Stars	Solent Stars	Solent Stars	N/A
1984–85	Kingston	Manchester United	Kingston	N/A
1985–86	Manchester United	Kingston Kings	Kingston	Birmingham Bullets
1986–87	Portsmouth	BCP London	Kingston	Kingston
