= 1979–80 National Basketball League season =

- League: National Basketball League
- Sport: Basketball
- Number of teams: 10

Roll of Honour
- National League champions: Crystal Palace Chevrons
- National League runners-up: Doncaster Ziebart Panthers
- Play-offs champions: Crystal Palace Chevrons
- Play-offs runners-up: Coventry Team Fiat
- National Cup champions: Crystal Palace Chevrons
- National Cup runners-up: Doncaster Ziebart Panthers

National Basketball League seasons
- ← 1978–79 1980–81 →

The 1979–80 Rotary Watches National Basketball League season was the eighth season of the National Basketball League.

The league was sponsored by Rotary Watches for the second consecutive year and Crystal Palace won an unprecedented treble of League, Playoffs and National Cup. Crystal Palace were helped by Alton Byrd, who would become the best known name in British basketball and pick up the season MVP award.

== Team changes ==
Malcolm Chamberlain, the owner of the London Metros uprooted the team, relocating from London to Kingston upon Thames and the Tolworth Recreation Centre, rebranding as Kingston. With their added sponsorship they would be known as Kelly Girls International Kingston. Guildford Pirates, the NBL Division 2 champions, joined the league and following a sponsorship deal would be Team Talbot, Guildford. Runners-up Hemel Hempstead also joined the league and would be known as Hemel Hempstead Ovaltine playing at Bletchley Leisure Centre. The Blackpool Pacemakers completed the newcomers to the league. The Milton Keynes All-Stars, Loughborough All-Stars, Exeter St Lukes TSB and Bracknell Bullets all dropped out.

== National League standings ==
=== Division One ===
Pos	Team	P	W	L	F	A	Pts
1	Crystal Palace Chevrons	18	18	0	1936	1498	36
2	Doncaster Ziebart Panthers	18	14	4	1751	1673	28
3	Coventry Team Fiat	18	14	4	1788	1644	28
4	Hemel Hempstead Ovaltine	18	12	6	1686	1634	24
5	Kelly Girls International Kingston	18	10	8	1836	1702	20
6	Sunderland Sunblest	18	9	9	1672	1683	18
7	Stockport Belgrade	18	5	13	1763	1874	9
8	Manchester ATS Giants	18	3	15	1533	1754	6
9	Blackpool Pacemakers	18	3	15	1612	1839	6
10	Team Talbot, Guildford Pirates	18	2	16	1592	1873	4

=== Division Two ===
Pos	Team	P	W	L	F	A	Pts
1	Nottingham	14	11	3	1269	1155	22
2	Camden & Hampstead	14	11	3	1449	1327	22
3	Leeds Larsen Lions	14	11	3	1346	1218	22
4	Brighton	14	8	6	1332	1290	16
5	Exeter St Lukes	14	7	7	1311	1287	14
6	Team Hemeling Birmingham	14	3	11	1334	1467	6
7	Plymouth Panasonic	14	3	11	1261	1396	6
8	Brunel Ducks	14	2	12	1253	1435	4

== Rotary Watches playoffs ==
=== Semi-finals ===
venue & date	Team 1	Team 2	Score
March 14, Wembley Arena	Doncaster Ziebart Panthers	Coventry Team Fiat	84-100
March 14, Wembley Arena	Crystal Palace Chevrons	Hemel Hempstead Ovaltine	98-75

=== Third Place ===
venue & date	Team 1	Team 2	Score
March 15, Wembley Arena	Doncaster Ziebart Panthers	Hemel Hempstead Ovaltine	84-75

=== Final ===
15 March

Crystal Palace Chevrons	93–85	Coventry Team Fiat
Pts: Mark Saiers 26		Pts: Greg White (MVP) 38

Wembley Arena

== Butlins National Cup Final ==
25 January 1980

Crystal Palace Chevrons	97–67	Doncaster Ziebart Panthers
Pts: Peter Jeremich 21, Mark Saiers 17

Concord Sports Centre, Sheffield
Attendance: 1,500

== See also ==
- Basketball in England
- British Basketball League
- English Basketball League
- List of English National Basketball League seasons
