= 1977–78 National Basketball League season =

- League: National Basketball League
- Sport: Basketball
- Number of teams: 10

Roll of Honour
- National League champions: Cinzano Crystal Palace
- National League runners-up: Milton Keynes Embassy All-Stars
- National Cup champions: Cinzano Crystal Palace
- National Cup runners-up: Coventry Team Fiat

National Basketball League seasons
- ← 1976–77 1978–79 →

The 1977–78 Guinness National Basketball League season was the sixth season of the National Basketball League.

The league was sponsored by Guinness and the number of teams participating remained at ten. The Loughborough team moved to Leicester, while Exeter and Stockport replaced the Avenue and Durham teams.

The Crystal Palace team completed a third consecutive double of National League and Cup. There were no playoffs for the League during this era and the previous system of awarding one point to losing teams in the league table was scrapped.

== National League ==
=== First Division ===
Pos	Team	P	W	L	F	A	Pts
1	Cinzano Crystal Palace	18	18	0	1881	1343	36
2	Milton Keynes Embassy All-Stars	18	16	2	1858	1626	32
3	Coventry Team Fiat	18	12	6	1820	1668	24
4	Doncaster Wilson Panthers	18	10	8	1734	1658	20
5	Bowmer & Kirkland Leicester All-Stars	18	9	9	1579	1571	18
6	Stockport Belgrade	18	9	9	1593	1614	18
7	Manchester ATS Giants	18	8	10	1637	1625	16
8	London 'Y' Metros	18	5	13	1643	1702	9*
9	Exeter St Lukes TSB	18	3	15	1547	1842	6
10	Bedford Vauxhall Motors	18	0	18	1318	1979	0

=== Second Division ===
Pos	Team	P	W	L	F	A	Pts
1	EPAB Sunderland	20	20	0	2151	1614	40
2	Leatherhead	20	17	3	1761	1429	34
3	Telefusion Blackpool	20	14	6	2107	1856	28
4	Seensee Maidenhead Sonics	20	12	8	1926	1856	24
5	Hemel Hempstead Lakers	20	10	10	1713	1646	20
6	Avenue Islington	20	9	11	1560	1551	20
7	Nottingham	20	9	11	1755	1841	18
8	Bromley	20	5	15	1793	2051	10
9	Derby CFE	20	4	16	1409	1730	9*
10	Miles Mustangs	20	4	16	1513	1807	8
11	Birmingham Bulldogs	20	4	16	1646	1953	8

== Guinness National Cup Final ==
April 01

Cinzano Crystal Palace	89–87	Coventry Team Fiat

Wembley Arena

== See also ==
- Basketball in England
- British Basketball League
- English Basketball League
- List of English National Basketball League seasons
