= 1978–79 National Basketball League season =

- League: National Basketball League
- Sport: Basketball
- Number of teams: 11

Roll of Honour
- National League champions: Doncaster Ziebart Panthers
- National League runners-up: Crystal Palace Chevrons
- Playoffs champions: Crystal Palace Chevrons
- Playoffs runners-up: Coventry Team Fiat
- National Cup champions: Doncaster Ziebart Panthers
- National Cup runners-up: Crystal Palace Chevrons

National Basketball League seasons
- ← 1977–78 1979–80 →

The 1978–79 Rotary Watches National Basketball League season was the seventh season of the National Basketball League.

The league was sponsored by Rotary Watches and the number of teams participating increased to eleven.

Doncaster completed the league and National Cup double, but Crystal Palace won the newly introduced Playoffs.

== Team changes ==
Leicester switched back to Loughborough and Bedford dropped out of the league. Bracknell and Sunderland joined; the latter playing at the Crowtree Leisure Centre in the centre of Sunderland.

== National League ==
=== First Division ===
Pos	Team	P	W	L	F	A	Pts
1	Doncaster Ziebart Panthers	20	17	3	1831	1588	34
2	Crystal Palace Chevrons	20	16	4	1895	1628	32
3	London 'Slick Willies Y' Metros	20	15	5	1938	1752	30
4	Coventry Team Fiat	20	13	7	1851	1602	26
5	Milton Keynes All-Stars *	20	13	7	1866	1671	24
6	Swithland Motors Loughborough All-Stars	20	10	10	1778	1902	20
7	Sunderland Sunblest	20	7	12	1903	1938	15
8	Manchester ATS Giants	20	7	13	1847	1945	14
9	Stockport Belgrade	20	7	13	1663	1756	14
10	Bracknell Bullets	20	3	16	1611	2001	6
11	Exeter St Lukes TSB	20	1	19	1654	2054	2

deducted two points *

=== Second Division ===
Pos	Team	P	W	L	F	A	Pts
1	Guildford Pirates	18	15	3	1620	1426	30
2	Hemel Hempstead Lakers	18	15	3	1688	1427	30
3	Leeds Larsen Lions	18	13	5	1728	1453	26
4	Telefusion Blackpool	18	12	6	1513	1467	24
5	Nottingham	18	12	6	1783	1607	24
6	Brighton Rucanor	18	10	8	1648	1576	20
7	Bromley	18	6	12	1638	1743	12
8	Maidenhead Sonics	18	4	14	1354	1588	7*
9	Birmingham Bulldogs	18	2	16	1426	1724	3*
10	Derby CFE	18	1	17	1423	1810	2

== Rotary Watches playoffs ==
=== Semi-finals ===
venue & date	Team 1	Team 2	Score
March 16, Wembley Arena	Doncaster Ziebart Panthers	Coventry Team Fiat	72-75
March 16, Wembley Arena	Crystal Palace Chevrons	London 'Slick Willies Y' Metros	100-78

=== Third Place ===
venue & date	Team 1	Team 2	Score
March 17, Wembley Arena	Doncaster Ziebart Panthers	London 'Slick Willies Y' Metros	98-85

=== Final ===
17 March

Crystal Palace Chevrons	75–63	Coventry Team Fiat
Pts: Mark Saiers 23

Wembley Arena

== Butlins National Cup Final ==
26 January 1979

Doncaster Ziebart Panthers	73–71	Crystal Palace Chevrons
Pts: Bryan Dunn 22, Cliff Bell 21, Dan Lloyd 15, John Belk 9, Ian Day 7, Ian Redford 2 (winning basket)		Pts: Kenny Walton 16

Concord Sports Centre, Sheffield
Attendance: 1,600

== See also ==
- Basketball in England
- British Basketball League
- English Basketball League
- List of English National Basketball League seasons
