= English National Cup (basketball) =

UK sport competition

The English National Cup is an annual basketball knock-out competition held between professional, semi-professional and amateur teams from the various divisions of the National Basketball League. For most of the competition's history, the draw has featured the elite of English basketball, but teams from the British Basketball League currently do not compete in the National Cup, as they compete in their own separate competition, the BBL Cup.

The final is usually played midway through the season, at a neutral venue. The winners of the tournament are awarded the George Williams Trophy, which is named for the man who donated the original cup.

== History ==
The competition was originally launched as the A.B.B.A. National Championship in 1936, and was the first attempt by the Amateur Basketball Ball Association (A.B.B.A.) to develop an annual national basketball championship in England and Wales. The National Championship was initially structured as an end-of-season event to allow regional champions to compete against their peers from across England and Wales. It was governed by the Amateur Basket Ball Association (A.B.B.A.), a forerunner of the current Basketball England organisation. During World War II, the competition was put on hiatus; the last pre-war winners, Birmingham Athletic Institute, retained the trophy for the duration of the hostilities.

Following the introduction of the National Basketball League (NBL) in 1972, the cup began a gradual decline in its influence on the English game as alternative national competitions became more established. The introduction of the NBL's own end-of-season playoffs in 1979 resulted in the competition being restructured into a season-long knockout tournament similar to football's FA Cup, with the competition renamed the National Cup to avoid confusion with the league championship. This structure continued through the introduction of the independent, franchise-based British Basketball League in 1987, though the cup was eventually truncated to a 16-team event for 1998 onwards, with the clubs holding a BBL franchise being joined by the top teams from the previous year's NBL Division 1 standings. This change in format came at the same time as the BBC began showing live coverage of the semi-finals and final.

In 2003, the governance and competition structure of basketball in England underwent a period of reinvention, which included rebranding the NBL as the English Basketball League and introducing new rules governing the use of import players across all Basketball England competitions. These changes led to conflict with the British Basketball League, which withdrew the support of all top-flight clubs and started their own breakaway competition. The withdrawal of the top-flight clubs led to the National Cup returning to a more open structure, with teams able to enter from all divisions of the NBL. This format largely remains to this day, with small variations in organisation during the early rounds.

== Format ==
The current competition structure is a knockout tournament with pairings drawn completely at random – there are no seeds, with the draw for all the rounds up to and including the quarter-final taking place in May.

When there are an uneven number of clubs in the draw, some pre-selected teams will receive byes into the next round. In some seasons the number of entries has required a preliminary round.

== Past Final Results ==
Season	Winners	Runners-up	Venue	Result
1935–36	Hoylake YMCA	London Polytechnic	Birmingham	32 – 21
1936–37	Hoylake YMCA	Latter Day Saints	Liverpool	23 – 17
1937–38	Catford Saints	Rochdale Greys	Wembley Arena	61 – 47
1938–39	Catford Saints	Rochdale Greys	London Arena	53 – 41
1939–40	Birmingham Athletic Institute	Central YMCA	London Arena	35 – 30
1941–1946	No competition			
1946–47	Carpathians	Birmingham Dolobran	Birmingham	48 – 25
1947–48	Latter Day Saints	Latvian Society	Barking	39 – 30
1948–49	Latter Day Saints	Birmingham Dolobran	Leicester	44 – 35
1949–50	Latter Day Saints	USAF Burtonwood	Nottingham	43 – 32
1950–51	Birmingham Dolobran	London Polytechnic	Nottingham	34 – 33
1951–52	London Polytechnic	Birmingham Dolobran	Wembley Arena	40 – 29
1952–53	London Polytechnic	Birmingham Dolobran	Manchester	55 – 46
1953–54	London Polytechnic	Nottingham YMCA	Birmingham	98 – 53
1954–55	London Polytechnic	Birmingham Dolobran	London Arena	58 – 54
1955–56	Oxford University	Hoddesdon	London Arena	75 – 59
1956–57	Central YMCA	London Polytechnic	London Arena	63 – 51
1957–58	Central YMCA	East Ham	London Arena	48 – 40
1958–59	Aspley OB	Birmingham Dolobran	Leicester	58 – 39
1959–60	Central YMCA	London Polytechnic	Birmingham	95 – 62
1960–61	London University	Central YMCA	South Ruislip	68 – 59
1961–62	Central YMCA	RAE Eagles	South Ruislip	87 – 47
1962–63	Central YMCA	London University	Royal Albert Hall	70 – 69
1963–64	Central YMCA	London University	Royal Albert Hall	78 – 56
1964–65	Aldershot Warriors	Oxford University	Crystal Palace National Sports Centre, South London	79 – 63
1965–66	Oxford University	Aldershot Warriors	Crystal Palace National Sports Centre, South London	91 – 70
1966–67	Central YMCA	Vauxhall Motors	Crystal Palace National Sports Centre, South London	64 – 62
1967–68	Oxford University	Aldershot Warriors	Crystal Palace National Sports Centre, South London	61 – 59
1968–69	Central YMCA	Aldershot Warriors	Crystal Palace National Sports Centre, South London	70 – 62
1969–70	Liverpool Police	Oxford University	Crystal Palace National Sports Centre, South London	73 – 67
1970–71	Manchester University	Sutton	Crystal Palace National Sports Centre, South London	88 – 81
1971–72	Avenue	Cambridge	Crystal Palace National Sports Centre, South London	78 – 66
1972–73	London Latvian SK	Sutton	Crystal Palace National Sports Centre, South London	70 – 69
1973–74	Sutton & Crystal Palace	Embassy All Stars	Crystal Palace National Sports Centre, South London	120 – 100
1974–75	Embassy All Stars	Sutton & Crystal Palace	Empire Pool, West London	82 – 81
1975–76	Crystal Palace	Embassy All Stars	Empire Pool, West London	108 – 88
1976–77	Crystal Palace	Embassy All Stars	Empire Pool, West London	91 – 90
1977–78	Crystal Palace	Team Fiat Coventry	Empire Pool, West London	89 – 87
1978–79	Doncaster Panthers	Crystal Palace	Concord Sports Centre, Sheffield	73 – 71
1979–80	Crystal Palace	Doncaster Panthers	Concord Sports Centre, Sheffield	97 – 67
1980–81	Crystal Palace	Doncaster Panthers	Coventry Sports Centre, Coventry	91 – 74
1981–82	Solent Stars	Doncaster Panthers	Granby Halls, Leicester	127 – 91
1982–83	Solent Stars	Birmingham Bullets	Granby Halls, Leicester	98 – 97
1983–84	Solent Stars	Leicester Riders	Royal Albert Hall, London	86 – 67
1984–85	Kingston Kings	Manchester United	Royal Albert Hall, London	103 – 98
1985–86	Kingston Kings	Solent Stars	Royal Albert Hall, London	113 – 82
1986–87	Kingston Kings	Portsmouth	Royal Albert Hall, London	95 – 87
1987–88	Kingston Kings	Portsmouth	Royal Albert Hall, London	90 – 84
1988–89	Bracknell Tigers	Manchester Eagles	London Arena, East London	87 – 75
1989–90	Kingston Kings	Sunderland Saints	London Arena, East London	103 – 78
1990–91	Sunderland Saints	Leicester Riders	London Arena, East London	88 – 81
1991–92	Kingston Kings	Thames Valley Tigers	Sheffield Arena, Sheffield	90 – 71
1992–93	Guildford Kings	Worthing Bears	Doncaster Dome, Doncaster	82 – 72
1993–94	Worthing Bears	Thames Valley Tigers	Sheffield Arena, Sheffield	92 – 83
1994–95	Sheffield Sharks	Thames Valley Tigers	Sheffield Arena, Sheffield	89 – 66
1995–96	London Towers	Sheffield Sharks	Sheffield Arena, Sheffield	70 – 58
1996–97	London Leopards	Sheffield Sharks	Sheffield Arena, Sheffield	87 – 79
1997–98	Thames Valley Tigers	Leicester Riders	Sheffield Arena, Sheffield	82 – 78
1998–99	Sheffield Sharks	London Leopards	Sheffield Arena, Sheffield	67 – 65
1999–00	Sheffield Sharks	Manchester Giants	Sheffield Arena, Sheffield	89 – 80
2000–01	Leicester Riders	London Leopards	Sheffield Arena, Sheffield	84 – 80
2001–02	Chester Jets	Birmingham Bullets	Sheffield Arena, Sheffield	112 – 105
2002–03	Brighton Bears	Chester Jets	National Indoor Arena, Birmingham	89 – 79
2003–04	Plymouth Raiders	Teesside Mohawks	English Institute of Sport, Sheffield	89 – 82
2004–05	Reading Rockets	City of Sheffield Arrows	National Indoor Arena, Birmingham	76 – 75
2005–06	Essex & Herts Leopards	Reading Rockets	National Indoor Arena, Birmingham	79 – 75
2006–07	Manchester Magic	Worthing Thunder	National Indoor Arena, Birmingham	85 – 80
2007–08	Manchester Magic	Worthing Thunder	Moorways Centre, Derby	104 – 89
2008–09	Reading Rockets	Manchester Magic	English Institute of Sport, Sheffield	74 – 68
2009–10	Bristol Academy Flyers	Manchester Magic	English Institute of Sport, Sheffield	63 – 61 (OT)
2010–11	Brixton TopCats	Bristol Academy Flyers	Ponds Forge, Sheffield	77 – 63
2011–12	London Leopards	Bristol Academy Flyers	Ponds Forge, Sheffield	64 – 63
2012–13	Leeds Carnegie	Bristol Academy Flyers	Ponds Forge, Sheffield	66 – 64
2013–14	Reading Rockets	Newham Neptunes	Worcester Arena, Worcester	93 – 72
2014–15	Manchester Magic	Reading Rockets	English Institute of Sport, Sheffield	76 – 58
2015–16	Manchester Magic	Worthing Thunder	English Institute of Sport, Sheffield	97 – 84
2016–17	Team Northumbria	Solent Kestrels	Worcester Arena, Worcester	73 – 56
2017–18	Hemel Storm	Manchester Magic	SportsDock, East London	94 – 77
2018–19	Loughborough Riders	Solent Kestrels	Essex Sport Arena, Colchester	82 – 63
2019–20	Solent Kestrels	Reading Rockets	Essex Sport Arena, Colchester	90 – 67
2020–21	No competition			
2021–22	Solent Kestrels	Team Newcastle	National Basketball Centre, Manchester	109 – 66
2022–23	Hemel Storm	Derby Trailblazers	National Basketball Centre, Manchester	102 – 81
2023–24	Milton Keynes Breakers	Reading Rockets	National Basketball Centre, Manchester	95 – 85
2024–25	Reading Rockets	Hemel Storm	National Basketball Centre, Manchester	108 – 93
