= 1976–77 National Basketball League season =

- League: National Basketball League
- Sport: Basketball
- Number of teams: 10

Roll of Honour
- National League champions: Cinzano Crystal Palace
- National League runners-up: Manchester ATS Giants
- National Cup champions: Cinzano Crystal Palace
- National Cup runners-up: Milton Keynes Embassy All-Stars

National Basketball League seasons
- ← 1975–76 1977–78 →

The 1976–77 Guinness National Basketball League season was the fifth season of the National Basketball League.

The league was sponsored by Guinness and the number of teams participating remained at ten. The Embassy All-Stars relocated to Milton Keynes, Cleveland became Durham and Bedford replaced Leeds.

The Crystal Palace team completed a second consecutive double of National League and Cup and were beginning to achieve national public recognition. There were no playoffs for the League during this era and Carl Olsson was awarded the season MVP award.

== National League ==
=== First Division ===
Pos	Team	P	W	L	F	A	Pts
1	Cinzano Crystal Palace	18	18	0	1869	1351	36
2	Manchester ATS Giants	18	15	3	1598	1414	33
3	Milton Keynes Embassy All-Stars	18	12	6	1605	1398	30
4	Doncaster Wilson Panthers	18	12	6	1552	1487	30
5	Coventry Team Fiat	18	10	8	1669	1528	28
6	Bowmer & Kirkland Loughborough All-Stars	18	8	10	1476	1523	26
7	Wicksteed-Magnet Metros	18	7	11	1506	1521	25
8	Bedford Vauxhall Motors	18	4	14	1479	1680	22
9	Avenue	18	3	15	1207	1553	21
10	Durham StrongArm Aycliff	18	1	17	1439	1945	19

=== Second Division ===
Pos	Team	P	W	L	F	A	Pts
1	Stockport Belgrade	20	18	2	1673	1358	38
2	Exeter St Lukes All Stars	20	18	2	1801	1467	38
3	Miles Mustangs	20	13	7	1805	1703	33
4	EPAB Sunderland	20	13	7	1646	1485	33
5	Birmingham Bulldogs	20	11	9	1607	1552	31
6	Seense Oxford Sonics	20	10	10	1538	1477	30
7	KCA Bury	20	8	12	1687	1722	28
8	Malory Lewisham	20	7	13	1622	1709	27
9	Nottingham	20	6	14	1567	1821	26
10	Derby CFE	20	4	16	1368	1522	24
11	Leeds Larsen Lions	20	2	18	1410	1944	22

== National Cup Final ==
Cinzano Crystal Palace	91–90	Milton Keynes Embassy All-Stars
Pts: Mark Saiers 26, Paul Philp 20, Jim Guymon ??, Vic Tinsley ??		Pts: Pete Sprogis 29, Earl Hogue 22, Jerry Walker 17, Stuart Turpie, John Belk

Wembley

== Leading scorers ==
Player	Team	Pts
Allen Bunting	Metros	539
Jim Guymon	Crystal Palace	500
Darnell Harrell	Coventry	494
Kenny Pemberton	Bedford	403
Earl Hogue	Embassy All-Stars	402
Mark Saiers	Crystal Palace	392
Wayne Metzger	Doncaster	387
Jeff Jones	Manchester	362
Jerry Walker	Embassy All-Stars	357
John Miller	Manchester	356

== See also ==
- Basketball in England
- British Basketball League
- English Basketball League
- List of English National Basketball League seasons
