= 1975–76 National Basketball League season =

- League: National Basketball League
- Sport: Basketball
- Number of teams: 10

Roll of Honour
- National League champions: Cinzano Crystal Palace
- National League runners-up: Islington Embassy All-Stars
- National Cup champions: Cinzano Crystal Palace
- National Cup runners-up: Islington Embassy All-Stars

National Basketball League seasons
- ← 1974–75 1976–77 →

The 1975–76 Guinness National Basketball League season was the fourth season of the English National Basketball League.

The league was sponsored by Guinness and the number of teams participating remained at ten. One new team appeared in the form of the Leeds Larsen Lions club, but Exeter St Lukes dropped down to the second division. The Crystal Palace team, sponsored by Cinzano and devoid of the Sutton merger, completed the double of National League and Cup. There were no playoffs during this era and American Jim Guymon of Crystal Palace won the George Williams Trophy for Most Valuable Player.

== National League ==
=== First Division ===
Pos	Team	P	W	L	F	A	Pts
1	Cinzano Crystal Palace	18	17	1	1806	1282	35
2	Islington Embassy All-Stars	18	16	2	1628	1337	34
3	Doncaster Wilson Panthers	18	11	7	1642	1451	29
4	Coventry Granwood	18	10	8	1509	1483	28
5	Manchester ATS Giants	18	8	10	1549	1603	26
6	Loughborough All-Stars	18	6	12	1395	1565	24
7	Avenue	18	6	12	1363	1565	24
8	Cleveland StrongArm	18	6	12	1527	1738	24
9	London YMCA Metros	18	6	12	1416	1572	24
10	Leeds Larsen Lions	18	0	18	1175	1509	18

=== Second Division ===
Pos	Team	P	W	L	F	A	Pts
1	Bedford Vauxhall Motors	12	11	1	873	792	23
2	Stockport Belgrade	12	10	2	894	785	22
3	Exeter St Lukes	12	6	6	905	877	18
4	Malory Lewisham	12	5	7	825	886	17
5	Nottingham	12	4	8	903	929	16
6	Guildford Pirates	12	3	9	839	836	15
7	Birmingham Bulldogs	12	3	9	729	863	15

== National Cup Final ==
3 April 1976

Cinzano Crystal Palace	108–88	Islington Embassy All-Stars
Pts: Jim Guymon 39, Martin Hall 27, Mark Saiers 19, Paul Philp 10		Pts: Steve Schmitt 32, Pete Sprogis 29, Dave Shelley 11

Wembley
Attendance: 7,000

== Leading scorers ==
Player	Team	Pts
Steve Pound	Doncaster	643
Bob Howell	Coventry	530
Peter Sprogis	Embassy All-Stars	478
Jim Guymon	Crystal Palace	464
Mark Badger	Manchester	457
Steve Schmitt	Embassy All-Stars	421
Steve Latham	Manchester	408
Steve Kloppenburg	Cleveland	397
Bob Overtonn	London YMCA	395
Carl Olsson	Loughborough	341

== See also ==
- Basketball in England
- British Basketball League
- English Basketball League
- List of English National Basketball League seasons
