= 1972–73 National Basketball League season =

- League: National Basketball League
- Sport: Basketball
- Teams: 6

Roll Of Honour
- National League champions: Avenue (Leyton)
- National League runners-up: Liverpool Bruno Roughcutters
- National Cup champions: London Latvians
- National Cup runners-up: Sutton

National Basketball League seasons
- 1973–74

The 1972–73 National Basketball League season was the inaugural season of the newly formulated National Basketball League.

By 1972, the Scots had their own thriving National League, though also competing in the "Rose Bowl", but when a London team, Sutton, defeated Edinburgh's Boroughmuir Barrs in the 1972 Final, the Basketball Association decided that it was time to relaunch the idea of an English National League. Therefore, the National Basketball League was inaugurated.

Liverpool were formed by a flamboyant owner called Vaughan Thomas who ran the Sports Education Department at Liverpool Polytechnic and they were the first club to incorporate a sponsor's name into their title, Bruno Roughcut tobacco from WD & HO Wills. They were also the first club to import an American, Larry Meek, specifically to play basketball. They played their home games at the Deeside Leisure Centre.

== League Standings ==
Pos	Team	P	W	L	F	A	Pts
1	Avenue (Leyton)	10	8	2	878	758	18
2	Liverpool Bruno Roughcutters	10	8	2	747	719	18
3	Sutton	10	6	4	798	758	16
4	Loughborough All-Stars	10	5	5	754	748	15
5	Sheffield YMCA Scorpions	10	3	7	821	769	13
6	RAF Fliers	10	0	10	635	825	10

=== League Title Play Off ===
Avenue defeated Liverpool 92–65 in the play off decider held at Loughborough College.

6 April 1973

Avenue (Leyton)	92–65	Liverpool Bruno Roughcutters

Loughborough College

== National Cup Final ==
31 March 1973

London Latvians	70–69	Sutton basketball team

Crystal Palace

== Leading Scorers ==
Player	Team	Pts
Mike Gattorna	Sheffield YMCA Scorpions	289
Steve Latham	Liverpool Bruno Roughcutters	213
Rick Mann	Avenue (Leyton)	191
Carl Olsson	Loughborough All-Stars	190
Bob Mackay	Sutton	186
Len Hoy	Avenue (Leyton)	166

== See also ==
- Basketball in England
- British Basketball League
- English Basketball League
- List of English National Basketball League seasons
