= Guildford Kings =

Former basketball team in Surrey, England

- League: BBL/NBL
- Established: 1973
- Folded: 1994
- History: London YMCA Metros; 1973–1979; Kingston; 1979–1988; Glasgow Rangers; 1988–1989; Kingston; 1989–1992; Guildford Kings; 1992–1994
- Arena: Guildford Spectrum
- Location: Guildford, Surrey
- Team colours: Red, navy blue and white
- Ownership: Barry Dow

Guildford Kings were a British basketball team, most prominent in the National Basketball League during the early 1980s and later the British Basketball League (BBL) during the late 1980s and early 1990s. The team ceased operations at the end of the 1993–94 season and folded.

== History ==
The team's origins date back to the London YMCA Metros who entered the National Basketball League in 1973. The Metros enjoyed several successful seasons and a variety of exotic names - due to sponsorship naming deals - throughout the 1970s, but in 1979, owner Malcolm Chamberlain uprooted the team and relocated them from London to the suburbs of Kingston upon Thames and to the Tolworth Recreation Centre, and rebranded as Kingston.

Kingston were one of the first entrants into the new Carlsberg League, finishing second in the inaugural 1987–88 British Basketball League season. In 1988, the franchise was bought out by Rangers F.C., and became the Glasgow Rangers, although the team played at the Coasters Arena in Falkirk. Rangers were League Champions in 1988–89, but were sold off after just one year and returned to Kingston, where the franchise enjoyed their most glorious period. From 1989 to 1992, they won every League Championship as well as many other trophies and competitions. In 1992 the franchise was moved yet again to the brand new Guildford Spectrum in Guildford to become the Guildford Kings. However, with the newly constructed Spectrum venue not yet complete, the Kings started their tenure in Guildford playing at the Guildford Sports Centre on Bedford Road before moving to the Spectrum in January 1993. The Kings competed in Guildford for two years in the British Basketball League and even European competitions, until 1994, when the franchise folded completely due to the club being unable to negotiate a viable contract with the owners of the Guildford Spectrum. The league sold Kings' licence to a group headed by Robert Earl, Ed Simons and Harvey Goldsmith, who went on to establish the equally successful Leopards franchise.

Professional basketball returned to Guildford in 2005 with the creation of Guildford Heat. The club folded in 2009.

Club basketball remains in Kingston with the Kingston Wildcats School of Basketball, a community basketball development club that practices and plays its home fixtures at Chessington School, competing in the Surrey League and Basketball England National League.

== Home arenas ==
- Tolworth Recreation Centre (1979–1988)
- Coasters Arena (1988–1989)
- Tolworth Recreation Centre (1989–1992)
- Guildford Sports Centre (1992–1993)
- Guildford Spectrum (1993–1994)

Note: European matches and some high-profile domestic games for Kingston, and later Guildford, were often played at the larger Crystal Palace National Sports Centre venue.

== Season-by-season records ==
Season	Division	Tier	Regular season						Post-season	BBL Trophy	National Cup	Head coach
Season	Division	Tier	Finish	Played	Wins	Losses	Points	Win %	Post-season	BBL Trophy	National Cup	Head coach
London Metros
1973–74	NBL	1	3rd	14	8	6	22	0.571				
1974–75	NBL	1	6th	18	8	10	26	0.444				
1975–76	NBL D1	1	9th	18	6	12	24	0.333				
1976–77	NBL D1	1	7th	18	7	11	25	0.389				
1977–78	NBL D1	1	8th	18	5	13	9	0.278				
1978–79	NBL D1	1	3rd	20	15	5	30	0.750	Semi-finals			
Kingston
1979–80	NBL D1	1	5th	18	10	8	20	0.556	Did not qualify			
1980–81	NBL D1	1	8th	18	5	13	10	0.278	Did not qualify		Quarter-finals	
1981–82	NBL D1	1	7th	22	7	15	14	0.318	Did not qualify		2nd round	
1982–83	NBL D1	1	9th	24	10	14	20	0.417	Did not qualify		Semi-finals	
1983–84	NBL D1	1	10th	36	14	22	28	0.389	Did not qualify		Quarter-finals	Jim Guymon
Kingston Kings
1984–85	NBL D1	1	1st	26	24	2	48	0.923	Runners-up		Winners, beating Manchester	Steve Bontrager
1984–85	NBL D1	1	2nd	28	24	4	48	0.857	Winners, beating Birmingham		Winners, beating Solent	Malcolm Chamberlain
1986–87	NBL D1	1	2nd	24	21	3	42	0.875	Runners-up		Winners, beating Portsmouth	Kevin Cadle
1987–88	BBL	1	2nd	28	24	4	48	0.857	Semi-finals		Winners, beating Portsmouth	Kevin Cadle
Glasgow Rangers
1988–89	BBL	1	1st	20	18	2	36	0.900	Winners, beating Livingston	Semi-finals		Kevin Cadle
Kingston Kings
1989–90	BBL	1	1st	28	25	3	50	0.892	Winners, beating Sunderland	Winners, beating Manchester	Winners, beating Sunderland	Kevin Cadle
1990–91	BBL	1	1st	24	23	1	46	0.958	Winners, beating Sunderland	Winners, beating Manchester	Semi-finals	Kevin Cadle
1991–92	BBL	1	1st	30	27	3	54	0.900	Winners, beating Thames Valley	Winners, beating Leicester	Winners, beating Thames Valley	Kevin Cadle
Guildford Kings
1992–93	BBL	1	4th	33	25	8	50	0.757	Semi-finals	Runners-up	Winners, beating Worthing	Kevin Cadle
1993–94	BBL	1	4th	36	24	12	48	0.667	Runners-up	Pool Stage	Semi-finals	Kevin Cadle
