= Birmingham Bullets =

- League: British Basketball League
- Established: 1974
- Folded: 2006
- History: Coventry; 1974-1980; Team Fiat; 1980-1982; Birmingham Bullets; 1982-2006
- Location: Birmingham, West Midlands
Home	Away	Third

The Birmingham Bullets were a British professional basketball team from Birmingham, England who competed in the British Basketball League (BBL). The club was founded in 1974 as Coventry Granwood before moving to Birmingham in 1980 as part of the team's sponsorship agreement with Fiat. The Bullets achieved some success in the BBL, mostly in the late 1990s and early 2000s, including winning the Playoffs in 1996 and 1998. They also achieved a 2nd place League finish in 1998 and were runners up in the 2000 Playoffs and 2002 Trophy. In latter years, the club struggled both on and off the court. The club officially resigned from the BBL in the summer of 2006 and soon after went into liquidation. Since then both the Birmingham Panthers and Birmingham Knights have endured short-lived and unsuccessful spells in the BBL.

== Notable former players ==
Note: Flags indicate national team eligibility at FIBA-sanctioned events. Players may hold other non-FIBA nationalities not displayed.

Criteria

To appear in this section a player must have either:

- Set a club record or won an individual award while at the club
- Played at least one official international match for their national team at any time
- Played at least one official NBA match at any time.

- (England) Clive Allen
- (United States) Jeff Bonds
- (United States) (England) Tony Dorsey
- (United States) (England) Fabulous Flournoy
- (United States) (France) Marcus Gaither
- (United States) Shawn Jamison
- (Barbados) (England) Nigel Lloyd
- (Canada) Skouson Harker
- (United States) (Italy) Rob Paternostro
- (United States) (Scotland) Paul Stewart
- (England) Yorick Williams

== Season-by-season records ==
Season	Division	Tier	Regular Season						Post-Season	Cup	Trophy	Head coach
Season	Division	Tier	Finish	Played	Wins	Losses	Points	Win %	Post-Season	Cup	Trophy	Head coach
Coventry Granwood
1974–75	NBL	I	5th	18	8	10	16	0.444	-		-	
1975–76	NBL	I	4th	18	10	8	20	0.556	-		-	
Coventry Team Fiat
1976–77	NBL	I	5th	18	10	8	20	0.556	-		-	
1978–79	NBL	I	4th	20	13	7	26	0.650	Runners Up, losing to Crystal Palace		-	
1979–80	NBL	I	3rd	18	14	4	28	0.778	Runners Up, losing to Crystal Palace		-	
Birmingham Team Fiat
1980–81	NBL	I	1st	18	17	1	34	0.944	Semi-finals	Semi-finals	-	
1981–82	NBL	I	5th	22	15	7	30	0.682	Did not qualify	Semi-finals	-	
Birmingham Barrett Bullets
1982–83	NBL	I	4th	24	17	7	34	0.708	Semi-finals	Runners Up, losing to Solent	-	
Davenports Birmingham
1983–84	NBL	I	9th	36	16	20	32	0.444	Did not qualify	2nd round	-	
1984–85	NBL	I	12th	26	6	20	12	0.231	Did not qualify	1st round	-	
Birmingham Bullets
1985–86	NBL	I	6th	28	15	13	30	0.536	Runners Up, losing to Kingston	1st round	-	
1986–87	NBL	I	9th	24	8	16	16	0.333	Did not qualify	1st round	-	
1987–88	BBL	I	7th	28	14	14	28	0.500	Quarter-finals	1st round	Pool Stage	
1988–89	NBL 1	II	3rd	20	16	4	32	0.800		Quarter-finals	-	
1989–90	NBL 1	II	8th	22	8	14	16	0.364		2nd round	-	
1990–91	NBL 1	II	8th	22	10	12	20	0.455		2nd round	-	
1991–92	BBL	I	8th	30	11	19	22	0.367	Quarter-finals	Quarter-finals	Pool Stage	
1992–93	BBL	I	5th	33	17	16	34	0.515	Quarter-finals	3rd round	Pool Stage	Peter Mintoft
1993–94	BBL	I	6th	36	21	15	42	0.583	Quarter-finals	Quarter-finals	Pool Stage	Peter Mintoft
1994–95	BBL	I	8th	36	18	18	36	0.500	Quarter-finals	Semi-finals	Pool Stage	Steve Tucker
1995–96	BBL	I	3rd	36	26	10	52	0.722	Winners, beating Towers	Semi-finals	Semi-finals	Nick Nurse
1996–97	BBL	I	4th	36	26	10	52	0.722	Quarter-finals	Quarter-finals	Quarter-finals	Nick Nurse
1997–98	BBL	I	2nd	36	29	7	58	0.806	Winners, beating Thames Valley	Semi-finals	Quarter-finals	Mike Finger
1998–99	BBL	I	7th	36	21	15	42	0.583	Quarter-finals	Quarter-finals	Quarter-finals	Mike Finger
1999–00	BBL S	I	3rd	34	17	17	34	0.500	Runners Up, losing to Manchester	1st round	Pool Stage	Mike Finger
2000–01	BBL S	I	4th	34	18	16	36	0.529	Quarter-finals	Quarter-finals	Pool Stage	Lance Randall
2001–02	BBL S	I	5th	32	15	17	30	0.469	Did not qualify	Runners Up, losing to Chester	Pool Stage	Lance Randall
2002–03	BBL	I	9th	40	11	29	22	0.275	Did not qualify	Quarter-finals	Semi-finals	Tony Garbelotto
2003–04	BBL	I	10th	36	2	34	4	0.056	Did not qualify	Quarter-finals	Pool Stage	Steve Tucker
2004–05	BBL	I	11th	40	5	35	10	0.125	Did not qualify	1st round	Pool Stage	Charlie Adams
2005–06	BBL	I	11th	40	9	31	17	0.225	Did not qualify	1st round	Pool Stage	Skouson Harker

== See also ==
- British Basketball League

== Sources ==
- "BASKETBALL: Bullets fail to kill off leaders; Scots power through in last quarter BIRMINGHAM BULLETS 70 SCOTTISH ROCKS 74 in the BBL". Birmingham Mail. 21 November 2005 – via The Free Library.
- "BBL Championship final preview". BBC Sport. 4 May 2001. Archived from the original on 31 August 2026.
- "Clive Allen refuses to give up on basketball in Birmingham". Birmingham Mail. 25 June 2008. Archived from the original on 22 April 2009.
- "Tony Dorsey feature Dynamite". BBC Sport. 2 May 2007. Archived from the original on 31 August 2026.
- O'Callaghan, Eoin (16 June 2019). "Nick Nurse: the NBA champion coach who learned his trade in ... Britain?". The Guardian. Archived from the original on 7 June 2025.
