= Basketball Northern Ireland =

Sports governing body

- Sport: Basketball
- Jurisdiction: Northern Ireland
- Abbreviation: BNI
- Founded: 1955
- Headquarters: Belfast
- President: Mary Matthew; Bill McCotter
- Chairman: Kevin Craig

Official website
- basketballni.com

Basketball Northern Ireland (also known as Ulster Basketball Association) is the governing body for basketball in Northern Ireland. The association, which is affiliated with Basketball Ireland, is the "area board" with responsibility for the promotion, development and administration of all basketball activities in Northern Ireland. The organisation, also known as "Basketball NI", has previously coordinated with other groups in Northern Ireland, including Netball NI.

== National teams ==
Basketball Northern Ireland governs the representation of Northern Irish players representing Northern Ireland only in Commonwealth Games. The senior 3x3 teams played their first matches in the Home Nations Qualifier for the 2022 Commonwealth Games.

== Affiliated clubs ==
North Star's Matt Quin blocks a shot from Tyrone Towers' Justin DeBerry in 2007

As of March 2024, the organisation's website listed 20 basketball clubs that were competing in competitions organised by Basketball NI:

- Ballymena Basketball
- Bc Wolves
- Belfast Phoenix Basketball Club
- Belfast Star
- Drogheda Wolves
- Hazelwood Hawks
- Letterkenny Blaze
- Lurgan Lakers
- Newry Fliers
- Omagh Thunder Basketball Club
- Magherafelt Titans
- Poyntzpass Pumas
- Queens Basketball Club
- Tyrone Tower
- UU Tigers
- Mourne Basketball Academy
- Larne YMCA
- North Star Warriors
- Antrim Jets
- Bangor City Warriors
