= National Basketball League (England) =

British basketball league

- Sport: Basketball
- Founded: 1972; 54 years ago
- Country: England; Wales
- Continent: FIBA Europe
- Most recent champions: Hemel Storm (2nd title)
- Level on pyramid: 3–5
- Domestic cup: National Cup
- Website: Official website

The National Basketball League, or NBL for short, is a league competition representing semi-professional and amateur basketball clubs from England and Wales. It forms levels 3 to 5 on the British basketball pyramid, in line with the Scottish Basketball Championship, sitting directly below the top-tier competition, Super League Basketball, and the second-tier competition, British Championship Basketball.

For the 2025–26 season, the league will have teams split across three levels:

Division 1 (NBL1) (24 teams across 2 regions)
Division 2 (NBL2) (40 teams across 4 regions)
Division 3 (NBL3) (56 teams across 6 pools)

The league also runs the English Women's Basketball League, with Division 1 and Division 2 North and South, and a junior structure with over 630 teams competing in Under-18s, Under-16s, Under-14s and Under-12s leagues.

There is no automatic promotion and relegation between the National Basketball League and Super League Basketball (SBL), or British Championship Basketball (BCB), due to the franchise system in place for the top-level leagues.

== Competitions ==
=== National Basketball League ===
Each club plays the other teams in their division on a home-away basis. Two points are awarded for a win, zero points for a loss. From Division 2, usually the top 2 teams after regular season play will be promoted to play in Division 1 for the next season. For each of the Division 3 leagues, it is usually only the league champion who is promoted.

=== Playoffs ===
The top eight teams in each division compete for the season's final showdown and last piece of silverware. The top four teams have home advantage against the lower placed sides in the quarter-final (1st v 8th, 2nd v 7th, 3rd v 6th & 4th v 5th). The Playoff Finals Weekend is conducted at a neutral venue, and brings together the Playoff finals for all Men's and Women's competitions. The Finals Weekend is now held at the National Basketball Performance Centre in Belle Vue, Manchester.

=== National Cup ===
The premier Cup competition in England and Wales, the National Cup is open to all NBL teams and played on a straight knockout format at club venues, with the final being held at a neutral venue. Until 2003, all British teams competed in this competition (including BBL teams).

== History ==
=== 1960–1972 ===
In 1960 a National Basketball League was introduced with nine members – Borehamwood Bullets, Watford Royals, Nottingham Dodgers, Aspley Old Boys (Nottingham), Birmingham Athletic Institute, Birmingham Dolobran, Doncaster Panthers, Manchester YMCA Comets, and Billingham Tech. Watford Royals won the first National league in 1960-61. Two of the strongest teams in the country at the time were London Central YMCA and London Poly. Neither of these London based teams felt it necessary to join the National Basketball League when the local competition in London was so strong.

A change of format in 1965-66 produced three sections, with a total of 16 teams, including two from Scotland; with a change of name to the British Basketball League known as the ‘Rosebowl’.

By 1972, the Scots had their own thriving National League, though also competing in the "Rose Bowl", but when a London team, Sutton, defeated Edinburgh's Boroughmuir Barrs in the 1972 Final, the Basketball Association decided that it was time to relaunch the idea of an English National League.

=== 1972–1986 ===
In 1972 the National League truly took off. The first season comprised just six clubs, plucked from regional and district leagues around the country, and was run in effect as a trial league. The six teams consisted of London-based teams Avenue Leyton and Sutton, Sheffield YMCA Scorpions and Liverpool Bruno Roughcutters from the North, Midlands club Loughborough All-Stars and touring team RAF Fliers.

After several successful seasons, expansion was implemented to 10 teams, and 1975 saw the addition of Division 2. The 1978–79 season was the first to adopt the post-season playoff format, while a year later the National Trophy was created.

Season	Division 1 Champions
1972–73	Avenue Leyton (1)
1973–74	Sutton & Crystal Palace (1)
1974–75	Islington Embassy All-Stars (1)
1975–76	Crystal Palace (2)
1976–77	Crystal Palace (3)
1977–78	Crystal Palace (4)
1978–79	Doncaster Panthers (1)
1979–80	Crystal Palace (5)
1980–81	Birmingham Team Fiat (1)
1981–82	Crystal Palace (6)
1982–83	Crystal Palace (7)
1983–84	Solent Stars (1)
1984–85	Kingston Kings (1)
1985–86	Sharp Manchester United (1)
1986–87	Portsmouth F. C. (1)

=== 1987–1993 ===
In 1987, there was a breakaway by the league's elite clubs looking to formulate a fully professional league in the United Kingdom. The new league, operated by a new body, British Basketball League, was established as the country's top and only fully professional basketball league. The National League became the country's second-tier competition. Initially, there was promotion and relegation between the BBL and the National League. The new league was sponsored by Carlsberg and was known as the Carlsberg League.

Season	National League Champions
1987-88	Worthing Bears (1)
1988-89	Oldham Celtics (1)
1989-90	Oldham Celtics (2)
1990-91	Cheshire Jets (1)
1991-92	Oldham Celtics (3)
1992-93	Doncaster Panthers (2)

=== 1993–2000 ===
In 1993, the NBL restructured once again after the top division reverted to the name BBL Championship. Because of this, the lower divisions were renamed and restructured to fit accordingly. From the 1993-94 British Basketball League season, Division 1 was renamed as the Budweiser Basketball League (BBL), thus having a domino effect where the previous Division 2 was rebranded as NBL Division 1 and Division 3 became Division 2, forming the bottom of the three-tiered National League structure.

That season also saw the last relegation between the top-two divisions (BBL and Division 1), as last-placed Oldham Celtics were demoted into the new Division 1 for 1994–95. Their replacements were Sheffield Forgers and Leopards, which signalled the start of the current 'buy-in' policy operated by the BBL, whereby teams can only buy a place in the league, operating a franchise system. 1997 saw the addition of Division 3 to the structure, welcoming new teams such as Reading Rockets, Taunton Tigers and the Manchester Giants B team.

Season	Division 1 Champions
1993–94	Coventry Crusaders (1)
1994–95	Crystal Palace (8)
1995–96	Crystal Palace (9)
1996–97	Ware Rebels (1)
1997–98	Richmond Jaguars (1)
1998–99	Solent Stars (2)
1999–00	Teesside Mohawks (1)

=== 2000–2003 ===
In 1999, the BBL restructured with a north–south conference system, and the following year the National Basketball League replaced Division 1 with the eight-team NBL Conference as the second-tier after the BBL. Subsequently, Division 2 became Division 1 and Division 3 became Division 2, with the addition of a new Division 3 forming effectively the fifth-tier of the structure.

However Division 3 only lasted for one season, as another reorganisation took place the following year, in 2001, which saw an expanded NBL Conference and Division 1, while Divisions 2 and 3 merged to form a regionalised format, with Division 2 North and Division 2 South. In 2003, after three seasons, the BBL ditched its North-South Conference format, and reverted to a single league of ten clubs. During the same year, the National Basketball League was rebranded as the English Basketball League, and once again was restructured with a new format.

Season	National Conference Champions
2000-01	Plymouth Raiders (1)
2001-02	Teesside Mohawks (2)
2002-03	Teesside Mohawks (3)

=== 2003–2025 ===
The Conference was disbanded, and EBL reverted the National Leagues to EBL Division 1, Division 2 and a regionalised North-South Division 3, with Division 4 (a reincarnation of the one-time old Division 3 of 2000) returning to the fold in 2006. In 2019–20, a regionalised North-South Division 2 was introduced, with Divisions 3 and 4 merging and the latter disappearing once again.

Season	Division 1 Champions
2003-04	Plymouth Raiders (2)
2004-05	Sheffield Arrows (1)
2005-06	Worthing Thunder (1)
2006-07	Worthing Thunder (2)
2007-08	Manchester Magic (1)
2008-09	Reading Rockets (1)
2009-10	Derby Trailblazers (1)
2010-11	Bristol Academy Flyers (1)
2011-12	BA London Leopards (1)
2012-13	Reading Rockets (2)
2013-14	Reading Rockets (3)
2014-15	Essex Leopards (2)
2015-16	Manchester Magic (2)
2016-17	Northumbria University (1)
2017-18	Loughborough Riders (1)
2018-19	Solent Kestrels (1)
2019-20	Solent Kestrels (2)
2020-21	Solent Kestrels (3)
2021-22	Solent Kestrels (4)
2022-23	Hemel Storm (1)
2023-24	Derby Trailblazers (2)
2024-25	Hemel Storm (2)

== See also ==
- Basketball in England
- Super League Basketball
- British Championship Basketball
- Scottish Basketball Championship
- Basketball Wales National League
- List of English National Basketball League seasons
