= Rotary Watches =

Company founded in 1895 in Switzerland

Rotary Watches Ltd
- Type: Privately held company
- Industry: Watch movement & case manufacturing
- Founded: 1895 by Moise Dreyfuss
- Headquarters: Clerkenwell Workshops, 27 - 31 Clerkenwell Close, London, EC1R 0AT
- Products: Wristwatches, accessories
- Parent: Citychamp Watch & Jewellery Group Limited
- Website: rotarywatches.com

Rotary Watches Ltd was established at La Chaux-de-Fonds, Switzerland by Moise Dreyfuss in 1895 and is now owned by Hong Kong's Citychamp Watch & Jewellery Group Limited. By the 1920s family members Georges and Sylvain Dreyfuss began exporting Rotary watches to Britain, which was to become the company's most successful market. Rotary later became the official watch supplier for the British Army. The well known “winged wheel” Rotary logo was introduced in 1925 and has since then undergone minor changes in appearance. Rotary became an international company selling watches in more than 35 countries. Since 2014, it has been owned by Citychamp Watch & Jewellery Group Limited (an investment holding company known as China Haidian Holdings until 2014).

== Background ==
In 1940, Rotary became an official watch supplier for the British Army. Coinciding with the Second World War and the drafting of huge numbers into the army, the move put a Rotary watch in almost every household in Britain, leaving a lasting impression of the brand in the UK. In 2006, Rotary Watches was elected as one of the UK's "superbrands", and has retained its place in successive years. The “winged wheel” Rotary logo was first introduced in 1925 and has since undergone only minor changes in appearance. In addition to its traditional brand, the company also produces watches under the more exclusive "Dreyfuss & Co" name.

Rotary is a member of the Federation of the Swiss Watch Industry FH. Rotary Watches' head office is now in the UK, and it is a wholly Chinese-owned company. Rotary offers a range of timepieces manufactured in Switzerland, together with a range of less expensive pieces made elsewhere, usually with movements from Japan which are then assembled in Japan or China.

Rotary watches typically use either a quartz or automatic movement, and often feature what Rotary refer to as the "Dolphin Standard" (equivalent to at least ISO 2281), meaning they are water resistant and may be suitable for all-day swimming and diving. Unique to Rotary is the "Revelation" design of reversible watch, which features two distinct movements and faces, allowing the wearer to change style at will or easily switch between two different time zones.

On February 19, 2025, the West Midlands-based watch company Peers Hardy Group signed an agreement with Citychamp to take control of design, manufacturing, and distribution for Rotary watches in the UK and internationally. Rotary watches published a blog titled "A New Chapter for Rotary" on their website on April 15 2025, and confirmed they had officially been purchased by Peers Hardy Group.

== Subsidiaries ==
- Dreyfuss & Co.
