= Paul Stimpson =

English basketball player

Personal information
- Born: 1959 (age 66–67)

Career information
- College: Borough Road College
- Playing career: Crystal Palace–Crystal Palace
- Position: Shooting guard

Career highlights
- 112 × English international caps

Paul Stimpson (born 1959) is a former English basketball player.

Paul Stimpson gained over 120 senior international appearances for England and Great Britain. He captained England and represented his country on 112 occasions and is one of the most significant players to have played for the England men's national basketball team.
At the age of 12 he started playing for Glyn Grammar School later joined the Crystal Palace junior team and played for Borough Road College. Paul was instrumental in assisting Crystal Palace as they maintained their position as Britain's best team. He was awarded his first senior international cap aged 19 and was a rare British talent during a period of imported American players.
After retiring from playing he joined the basketball department of an international marketing company, ISL Marketing, based in Lucerne, Switzerland. In 2003 he joined FIBA.
