= Basketball in England =

- Country: England
- Governing body: Basketball England
- National teams: Men's national team; Women's national team
- Representative team: Great Britain men's national basketball team

National competitions
- Super League Basketball; British Championship Basketball; National Basketball League

Basketball has a very long history in England, being introduced there by YMCA almost immediately after it was invented (having been created by the Canadian Dr. James Naismith in 1891 in Massachusetts). World Wars I and II further spurred its popularity.

The three highest profile team sports in England are football, cricket and rugby. Basketball belongs to the next tier alongside ice hockey and netball; like these sports, it has a significant and dedicated following, a professional league, but attracts little coverage from the major British media outlets and suffers from lack of "crossover" appeal. While England is the birthplace of the three main sports, and English sides are major powers in each of them, basketball is essentially an "import" from North America, and English/British teams have not generally been successful in them internationally, which also affects their profile.

The first tier is the Super League Basketball (SLB) which replaced the British Basketball League (BBL) in 2024. The league operates in a franchise system which means there is no automatic promotion or relegation with the tiers below. The second tier is the British Championship Basketball (BCB) which was founded in 2025. National Basketball League (NBL) serves between the third and fifth tier in line with the Scottish Basketball Championship (SBC) and Basketball Wales National League (BWNL).

== History ==
=== Introduced by YMCA ===
Basketball was first introduced in England between March 1892 and January 1893 by the president of Birkenhead YMCA, C.J. Proctor, who had observed the game during a business trip to Canada. This introduction of the game led to a growth in participation in the new game of basketball initially as an internal league played at Birkenhead YMCA members (England's first Central Venue League), and later to other YMCA clubs in the Wirral and Merseyside regions.

In June 1894 Mel Rideout, a participant in the first game at Springfield College, introduced the game at a YMCA Convention held in England. This did not lead to a wider take up of the game.

Birkenhead initiative remained a local development until 1911 when a YMCA instructor brought basketball to Birmingham YMCA, and a team was produced. Within a few months teams had sprung up in the district playing one another in friendly matches. The American Rules had been introduced, but the teams in Birmingham found them to be too complicated, and when forming a Local Basketball Association, they compiled a more practical set of rules for their own use.

The use of YMCA instructors from Springfield College gave a direct link to the origins of the game. Within a short time after the Birmingham Development many YMCA clubs in England had adopted the game and had formed District Associations similar to the Association in Birmingham. Most of these Associations found the same difficulty of complication in the American Rules and in 1912 the Birmingham Association Rules of Basketball were accepted throughout most of England with some slight differences in rules according to particular conditions.

=== World War I and the inter-war years ===
Many Inter-Clubs and Inter-YMCA. games were played until in 1914 with the start of World War I a large number of young men left their home towns for France. Basketball naturally lost a great deal of its initial impetus and although many games were played during the War years the development was limited.

With the arrival of the Americans into the War in 1917, many keen British basketball players, found out more about the game and in 1918 an American YMCA Physical Director brought some influence to bear on the District Associations in England, with the result that the local rules were altered slightly and the game became more like the American game. The game was influenced greatly by American forces in Europe during and after World War I and many European Countries as a result began to play Basketball. Britain continued to be influenced during this period, and YMCA clubs developed the game with added flavour. Rules, however, continued to vary according to the country in which the game was played and this state was to continue for a great number of years.

In 1924 basketball was included as a demonstration game at the Paris Olympic Games. Great Britain was successfully represented in this Tournament by a team from the London Central YMCA who won all their games. The London Central YMCA (also written about as CentYMCA Harriers in the Dutch press) were reigning National YMCA Champions this championship having been established in 1922. One of the players from the victorious YMCA team introduced the game to the Netherlands, i.e. A.M.V.J. Amsterdam in 1929. In his honour there still is to this day a tournament called after him, the Lew Lake tournament organized by the first Dutch basketball club, AMVJ Amsterdam, founded in January 1930. Still today Lew Lake is honoured in the Dutch basketball world as the first one to give basketball demonstrations and teach the game in Holland. AMVJ organized an international basketball tournament in March 1932, the first international games in the Netherlands. Teams from Belgium, Lille, Holland and CentYMCA took part. Centymca ended second after Olympique Lille.

The game continued to develop in England and in 1936 a meeting was called at the London Central YMCA to form a Governing Body for the sport. The new Association, the Amateur Basket Ball Association of England and Wales (ABBA.) was established with Mr. Herbert Naylor, the National Physical Director of YMCA in England as chairman, Mr. J. A. Clay of Birmingham as Honorary Secretary and Mr. W. Browning as London Area Secretary.

To run the Association England was divided into four areas:

1. Manchester and a radius of up to 100 miles
2. Birmingham and a radius of up to 100 miles
3. London (including Bournemouth) and a radius of up to 100 miles
4. Cardiff and a radius of up to 100 miles

A Divisional Secretary was appointed in each area. The game continued to spread in England as it was doing worldwide. Prior to 1936 basketball had been included in the Far Eastern Olympics held in Japan each year.

Many new faces appeared in Basketball in England. Mr. George Williams of London presented a cup to the ABBA, as Senior Championship Cup and the first tournament for the cup was staged in Birmingham on 6 June 1936. The finalists in this Knockout Championship Tournament were Hoylake YMCA and London Polytechnic. The former winning the 1st Championships of England and Wales by 32 points to 21 points.

Greater interest was taken in Basketball because of the incentive of the Championships and many more teams affiliated to ABBA the following year. The standard of play also improved and on 19 March 1938, Hoylake YMCA (the 1937 winners) were opposed by Latter Day Saints. This game won by Hoylake YMCA was the first game to be broadcast on radio with a running commentary being given during the final.

The George Williams Trophy played for by the teams in this competition is still used today for EB's premier Championship Competition.

Hoylake YMCA in October 1937 represented England in the Tournament at a Paris Competition - the first International team to play for England.

During 1937, Basketball had increased in popularity, not only with senior players, but also with the younger members. Junior games were played extensively and in 1938 ABBA organised on similar lines to the Senior Championships a National Junior Championship of England and Wales. Plaistow YMCA presented the ABBA with a Challenge Cup. On 9 April 1938 the first Junior Championship Final was held in Birmingham between Ton Pentre (Rhondda Valley) Boys' Club and London Polytechnic with the Welsh Club winning the first tournament.

On the 18th, 19th, and 20 April 1938 basketball was included along with the European Roller Speed Skating Championships the Semi Finals and Finals of the Basketball Championship of England and Wales. In the Final, the Catford Saints beat Rochdale Greys 61 points to 47 points. The standard of play in this Championship showed considerable improvement. On the day following the Championship Finals Catford Saints represented England in the first International match ever held in Britain. The game against Germany was won by England by 40 points to 35 points.

On 22/23 October 1938 a composite England International Team competed in the International Basketball Tournament at the Sports Palace in Berlin. The team with Mr. W. Browning as Coach and Mr. J. Clay as Manager included three Birmingham players - F. Cole, C. Hunt and A. J. Lee, four London players - F. Gibson. R. Bradley, A. Hants, M. Ashton. and also F. Allen (Rochdale) and G. McMinn (Manchester). This was the first time a composite International Team had travelled abroad and this in itself showed the development of English Basketball. Birmingham and London Area supplied the majority of those International players in keeping with the level of the development of Basketball in England.

ABBA of England and Wales, had, gone all out to attract the public, with success. Basketball was now being played extensively in most areas of England and Wales and the public seemed to be interested. In February 1939 a London National League was started involving 6 teams playing in a League Competition at Haringey Arena.

=== World War II ===
English Basketball was progressing and by including "Catford Saints" as the English team (1939 Championship Winners) in the Liège Festival that year, the ABBA once more made England's position in European Basketball felt. It is unfortunate for the progress of Basketball that World War II started in the latter part of 1939.

A Championship Final was held in April 1940 with the Birmingham Athletic Institute (BAI) beating London Central YMCA in this final. Due to the war there was no Championship for the next six years and thus Birmingham retained the Trophy for that period.

The War, although stemming the development of the actual number of clubs in Britain, did have a good effect upon the game. The Army adopted the game and a number of Army teams were started. The Army influenced the other services and Inter-Service Tournaments were started.

Many novices at basketball were introduced to a better class of play and coaching in the services. With the fall of the European Countries, many service personnel from these countries came to Britain, included in the Polish and French services contained some very keen basketball players, these people helped in the development of the game in the Forces.

In 1942/43, with the arrival of American forces, a further impetus to the growth of the game was given and their influence on the game in Britain continued for many years after the War.

== Present ==
According to Sport England's 2024 Active Lives surveys, basketball participation reached its highest level since the surveys' inception in 2015. Basketball is considered one of the fastest-growing sports in the UK. It is the second most popular team sport, with over 1.5 million people playing weekly.

Basketball in England is led by Basketball England and there are similar organisations in other parts of the UK including Basketball Wales, basketballscotland and Basketball Northern Ireland.

Over 1,198,900 under-16s play basketball in England on a weekly basis. The most popular school years for the sport are years 3-6 (640,000) and years 7-11 (509,600). The gender split is 814,600 boys and 374,000 girls. Over 344,400 adults take part in basketball (at least) twice in a 28-day period as well.

Basketball struggles to get funding and has undergone a lot of change in the early 2020s, but there are still over a million people playing every week.

=== Professional Basketball ===
At the professional level, English basketball is incorporated with the rest of British basketball. The structure is governed by the British Basketball Federation internationally, while the professional leagues operate as follows:

Super League Basketball (SLB): Replacing the former BBL and WBBL after the 2023/24 season, this represents the highest level of professional basketball (Men's and Women's) in Great Britain. The league currently consists of 9 franchise teams.

- Competitions: The league season includes the SLB Championship (the regular season), the SLB Cup (a knockout competition), and the SLB Trophy (a grouped competition).

British Championship Basketball (BCB): Sitting below the SLB, this tier consists of 14 teams. For 2026-27 season, Falkirk Fury and Boroughmuir Blaze from Scotland will also join to this league.

- Competitions: Teams compete in the league and the BCB Trophy.

=== Semi-professional and Amateur Basketball ===
Below the professional tier lies the National Basketball League (NBL). This structure forms the bridge between professional and grassroots basketball, operating in line with the Scottish Basketball Championship and the National Leagues in Wales.

- NBL Division One: The premier semi-professional tier, split into two groups.
- NBL Division Two: Split into four regional groups.
- NBL Division Three: Split into six regional groups.
- National Cup: A knockout competition open to all NBL teams.

Local Leagues (Amateur): At the grassroots level, there are casual, fun, and friendly leageus within local communities. These cater to all ages, starting as early as 5 years old. Examples include the Sheffield Basketball League and the Manchester Area Basketball League.

=== University Basketball ===
University basketball is primarily governed by BUCS.

- Competitions: The BUCS programme features over 300 teams from 120+ institutions. Competitions include the BUCS National Trophy and BUCS Conference Cups (regional knockouts like Midlands, Northern, South Eastern, etc.).
- NBL Integration: Some university teams also compete in the NBL system to gain higher-level experience (e.g., Birmingham City University).
- Recreational: Many universities also host internal social and intramural leagues.

=== College and Academy Basketball (16-19 Years) ===
Operated by the Association of Colleges (AoC), this sector caters to 16–19-year-olds in sixth forms and further education colleges.

- Elite Academy Basketball League (EABL): The premier junior competition, split into North and South conferences.
- College Basketball League (CBL):
  - Tier 2: Split into 3 groups.
  - Tier 3: Split into regional groups (North, East, South East, South West, South).
- Regional Leagues: Lower-tier development leagues (e.g., East Midlands, Yorkshire and Humber). Most EABL and CBL teams also have development teams.
- Cup: The AoC Basketball National Knockout Cup is the primary cup competition for college teams.

=== Youth Basketball (Club Level) ===
The youth structure in England is highly regionalised to reduce travel for younger players while providing elite competition for top prospects.

Under 18:

- Premier: The highest tier, split into three groups (Northern, Eastern, Western).
- Conference: Regionalised groups (e.g., North, North West, Midlands, London, South, etc.).
- National Cup: Knockout competition.

Under 16:

- Premier: Same structure as U18 Premier.
- Conference: Same structure as U18 Conference.
- Regional: Additional developmental tier split into broad regions (North, South, South West).
- National Cup: Knockout competition.

Under 14:

- Premier: Same structure as U16/U18 Premier.
- Conference: Same structure as U16/U18 Conference.

Under 12: Split into multiple regions based strictly on geographical locations to facilitate local play.

=== Dynamik National Schools Competition ===
This tournament is for secondary schools and colleges in England. Even though the top colleges usually play in EABL or CBL and other AoC competitions, they still usually place another team here to compete.

- Restrictions: Players registered with any EABL, WEABL, or CBL teams are generally not permitted to play in these leagues, with the exception of the U17 League.
- Under 19 & Under 17: Split into multiple groups followed by playoffs.
- Under 16 & Under 14 Co-Ed Premier: Elite co-ed leagues split into three groups, followed by Premier playoffs.
- Under 16 & Under 14 Co-Ed: Standard co-ed leagues split into multiple groups, followed by playoffs.

=== Jr. NBA League ===
This tournament is designed for Year 7 and Year 8 students (11–13 years old). Schools represent one of the 30 NBA teams and compete in multiple regional divisions. Organised by Basketball England in partnership with the NBA.

=== International Representation ===
At the international level, England competes under the umberalla of The British Basketball Federation. It organises Great Britain teams for men and women in international competition.

Olympics, FIBA World Cup, FIBA EuroBasket: English players compete under Team GB.

Commonwealth Games: England competes as a distinct nation. At the 2022 Birmingham Commonwealth Games, England won 3x3 Gold (Men) and Silver (Women) medals.
