= Solent Stars =

- League: EBL Division 1 (Note: At time of closing.)
- Founded: 1980
- Folded: 2007
- Arena: Fleming Park Leisure Centre
- Location: Southampton, England
- Head coach: Kerry Kirby
- Ownership: Bob Paulley
Home	Away

The Solent Stars were a basketball club from Southampton, who were one of the founder members of the British Basketball League, where they competed from 1987 to 1990. For the rest of their existence, the club competed in the English Basketball League and its forerunner the National Basketball League, and the club were members of Division 1 at the time of the club's demise.

== Club history ==
The Stars first joined the National League in 1980, having been formed the year before by a merger of the Portsmouth Pirates and Southampton Sharks from the Southern League. Success initially came easily to the fledgling club, winning the Division Two title and the National Trophy in their first season, and claiming immediate promotion to Division One. A first Division One title followed in the 1983/1984 season, and at the end of the 1986/1987 season the club were among those who broke away from the National Basketball League to form the British Basketball League.

After three years of solid if unspectacular mid-table finishes, the club struggled to find the financial backing to continue in the professional league, and after a lengthy search for more sponsors the club were forced to drop out of the top flight and return to the bottom of the English basketball structure, entering a team in Division Three (South) to keep the Stars' name alive. Despite the setback, the club were able to claim two subsequent promotions, as they took the Division Three and Division Two titles back-to-back to return to the top flight of the English game in the quickest time possible, only one step away from a return to the British league.

The club finished bottom of Division One in 1996/1997 with a 0-26 record, and was relegated back to Division Two, but this only served as a springboard for further success, as they won Division Two at the first attempt and then followed this up with the Division One title in 1998/1999. For the next several years, the club continued to compete in Division One, continuing through the league's reformatting into the English Basketball League. However, on 31 August 2007, the club announced that they would no longer be fielding a senior men's team in the National League due to a dispute with their home venue, Fleming Park Leisure Centre in Eastleigh. Although owner Bob Paulley was keen to stress this was not the end for the club, they never returned to active competition.

== Season-by-season records ==
Season	Division	Played	Won	Lost	Points	League	Playoffs	National Cup	National Trophy
Solent Stars
1980-81	NBL Division 2	16	15	1	30	1st	N/A	Quarter-final	Winners
1981-82	NBL Division 1	22	19	3	38	2nd		Winners	
1982-83	NBL Division 1	24	16	8	32	5th		Winners	
1983-84	NBL Division 1	36	32	4	64	1st	Winners	Winners	
1984-85	NBL Division 1	26	17	9	34	4th			
1985-86	NBL Division 1	28	12	16	24	10th			
1986-87	NBL Division 1	24	7	17	14	11th			
1987-88	BBL	28	14	14	28	8th			
1988-89	BBL	20	4	16	8	9th			
1989-90	BBL	28	7	21	14	7th			
1990-91	NBL Division 4 (South)	12	11	1	22	1st			
1991-92	NBL Division 3	22	20	2	40	1st			
1992-93	NBL Division 2	22	5	17	10	10th			
1993-94	NBL Division 1	18	7	11	14	8th			
1994-95	NBL Division 1	22	7	15	14	10th			
1995-96	NBL Division 1	22	3	19	6	1st			
1996-97	NBL Division 1	26	0	26	26	14th			
1997-98	NBL Division 2	24	23	1	46	1st	Winners		
1998-99	NBL Division 1	26	21	5	42	1st			
1999-2000	NBL Division 1	24	18	6	36	3rd			
2000-01	NBL Conference	21	5	16	10	7th			
2001-02	NBL Conference	18	11	7	22	3rd			
2002-03	NBL Conference	22	7	15	14	9th			
2003-04	EBL Division 1	22	4	18	8	10th			
2004-05	EBL Division 1	22	5	17	10	10th			
2005-06	EBL Division 1	26	4	22	8	12th			
2006-07	EBL Division 1	22	7	15	14	8th			

Notes:

- In 1996-1997 teams were awarded one point for a defeat.
- From 2000-2003 the NBL Conference operated as the second tier league, ahead of Division One.
- In 2003 the NBL was replaced by the EBL, which reinstated Division One as the second tier.
