= Crystal Palace (basketball) =

Former team of the British Basketball League

Crystal Palace was a basketball team competing in the National Basketball League (NBL) and then the British Basketball League (BBL), until they merged with the London Towers in 1998. They played in the Crystal Palace Sports Centre and were the most successful team in Britain throughout the seventies and early eighties.

== History ==
In 1966 the Old Suttonians basketball club was founded by several ex pupils of Sutton Grammar School including David Last and Terry Doherty who both performed the role of director of the club in future years. In 1972 the club entered the new National League as Sutton basketball club and finished third of six teams. the following season they relocated to Crystal Palace and became the Sutton & Crystal Palace club. Success arrived quickly with a league and cup double the very next season.

In 1975 the club dropped the Sutton prefix and gained sponsorship from Cinzano which helped propel them into being the best club in Britain. The team would go on to complete three consecutive doubles of National League and National Cup. The team became regarded as the pioneers of UK basketball and their early players included Jim Guymon, Martin Hall, Barry Huxley, Mark Saiers, Alan Baillie, Pete Jeremich and Paul Philp. An incredible treble ensued in the 79–80 season and other players to represent the club included players such as Dan Lloyd, Bob Roma, Paul Stimpson, Mick Bett and Alton Byrd, the latter considered the man who revolutionised basketball in Britain. Further success followed and it was not until the advent of Channel 4 TV coverage and big spending football club takeovers that Palace lost their mantle as top club.
In September 1986 Crystal Palace and Brunel Uxbridge & Camden Ducks joined forces with fixtures being split between the Crystal Palace Sports Centre and Brunel University. Immediate glory returned to the club when after finishing fourth in the league they went on to win the 1987 play Off's but after just one season the club ran into financial difficulty and were forced to sell many players and change their name back to just Crystal Palace.
Players from the highly successful junior programme led by Roy Packham and Mark Dunning made up the team along with a number of talented juniors from Kevin Hibb's Kingston Junior programme. Graham Hill, Derek Johnson, Brian Moore, Roger Hosannah, Derek Lewis, Paul Smith, Michael Hosannah and Adrian Cummings were notable juniors that made the transition to the senior team which was led by Daryl Reshaw and Shaughan Ryan.

Following the completion of the 1988 season the club dropped out of the Carlsberg League into the National League before failing to compete for the first time in the 1990/91 season. A return to action came the following season when Crystal Palace lined up in the third division of the revamped Carlsberg League finishing runners up to another former basketball giant the Solent Stars.
The returning Tim Lewis led the home grown talent along with Junior Peters Clinton ford, Brian Moore, Tunde Orelaja, Roger Lloyd and Adrian Jones. This team gain promotion two years running.

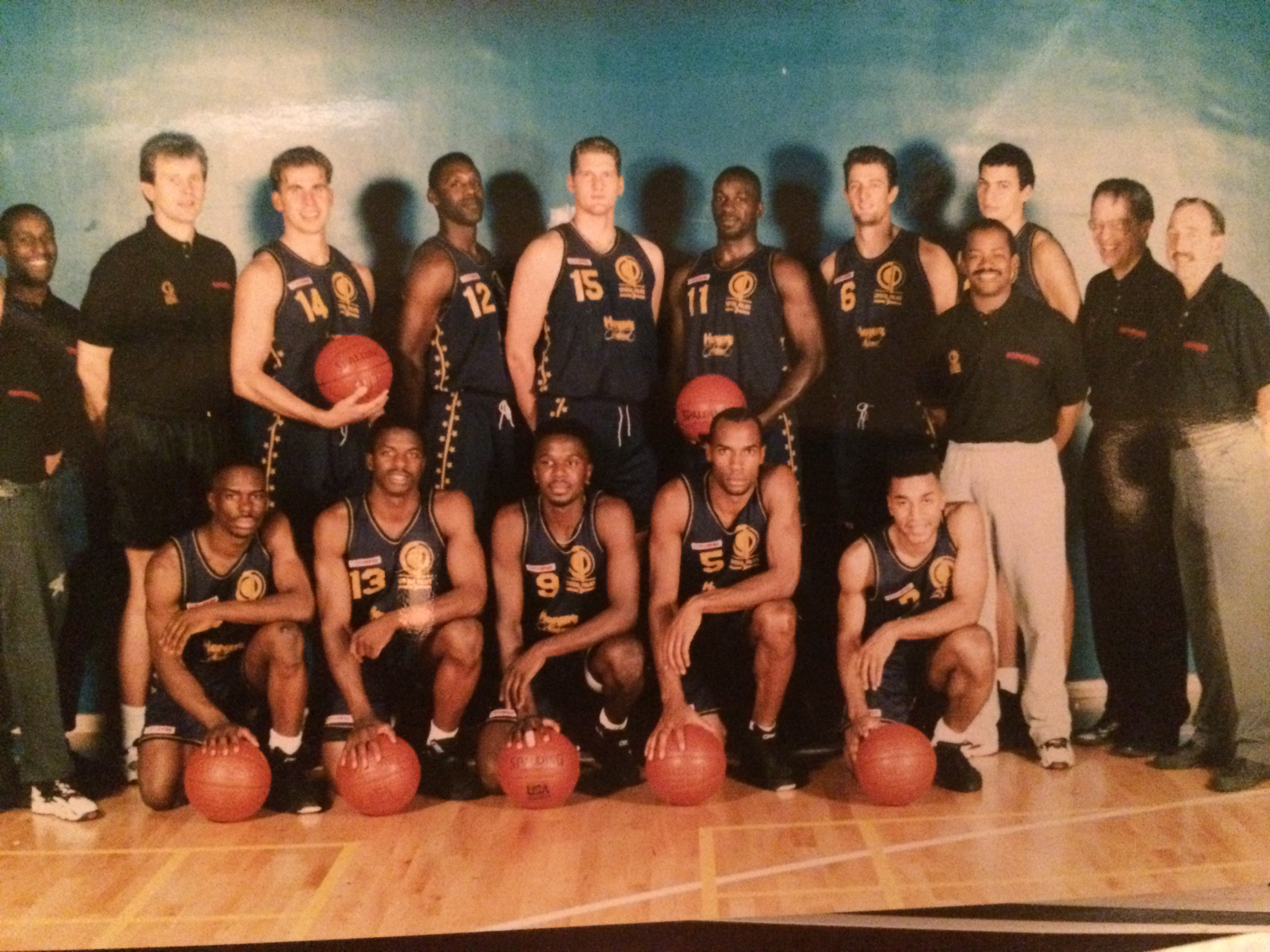

The 1993–1994 season saw Budweiser sponsor tier 1 of the league which as a consequence meant the National League was restructured moving Palace into division one where they finished Runner-up to Coventry Crusaders. The following season Alton Byrd returned to the club as player/general manager kick starting a successful season as they won Division One. The league win was repeated the following year because Palace had remained in the National League after their application to join the Budweiser League (tier 1) was rejected.
The team continued the development of British talent. Richard Scantlebury, Neill Rickets, Andy Powlesland, Graham Hill, Adrian Cummings, Ade Orelaja and Time Lewis all becoming permanent fixtures in the team.

In 1996 a return to the top tier in for the first time since 1988 ensued. Transition back to the BBL was difficult, other talented British players such as, Barry Gooch, Jason Crump, Clive Lindo, Jimmy Markham joined the club along with Junior Williams and Wayne Henry. A lack of sponsorship and the retirement of Alton Byrd had a major impact on the club. The Club tried to hang on to its ethos of growing local talent, Graham Hill a former junior and senior player was given the coaches job but after two mediocre seasons and despite the best efforts of club stalwarts Roy Packham and Terry Doherty the club merged with London Towers and the name Crystal Palace (the most successful UK basketball club in history at the time) ceased to exist.

== Record in European competition ==
Season	Competition	Round	Opponent	1st Leg	2nd Leg	Aggregate
1973-74	FIBA Korać Cup	First round	(Belgium) Carad	89-78	76-97	165-175
1974-75	FIBA European Champions Cup	First round	(Netherlands) BV RZ	55-107	65-87	120-194
1975-76	FIBA European Cup Winners' Cup	Second round	(Turkey) Galatasaray	77-91	83-60	160-151
1975-76	FIBA European Cup Winners' Cup	Quarter-finals	(Spain) CB Estudiantes	79-107	87-87	166-194
1975-76	FIBA European Cup Winners' Cup	Quarter-finals	(Italy) Milan	89-82	73-81	162-163
1975-76	FIBA European Cup Winners' Cup	Quarter-finals	(Germany) Hagen	96-86	74-83	170-169
1976-77	FIBA European Champions Cup	Group stage	(Spain) Real Madrid			
1976-77	FIBA European Champions Cup	Group stage	(Switzerland) Federale Lugano			
1976-77	FIBA European Champions Cup	Group stage	(Portugal) Sporting CP			
1977-78	FIBA European Champions Cup	Group stage	(France) ASVEL			
1977-78	FIBA European Champions Cup	Group stage	(Bulgaria) CSKA Sofia			
1978-79	FIBA European Champions Cup	Group stage	(Spain) Joventut			
1978-79	FIBA European Champions Cup	Group stage	(Netherlands) Leiden			
1978-79	FIBA European Champions Cup	Group stage	(Sweden) Södertälje			
1979-80	FIBA European Champions Cup	Group stage	(Spain) Real Madrid			
1979-80	FIBA European Champions Cup	Group stage	(Germany) Leverkusen			
1979-80	FIBA European Champions Cup	Group stage	(Denmark) Stevnsgade			
1980-81	FIBA European Champions Cup	Group stage	(Israel) Maccabi Tel Aviv			
1980-81	FIBA European Champions Cup	Group stage	(France) ASPO Tours			
1980-81	FIBA European Champions Cup	Group stage	(Greece) Panathinaikos			
1981-82	FIBA European Cup Winners' Cup	First round	(Iceland) Valur	118-80	104-81	222-161
1981-82	FIBA European Cup Winners' Cup	Second round	(Switzerland) Nyon	90-93	98-89	188-182
1981-82	FIBA European Cup Winners' Cup	Quarter-finals	(Croatia) Cibona	70-74	97-105	
1981-82	FIBA European Cup Winners' Cup	Quarter-finals	(Italy) Virtus Bologna	91-97	68-77	
1981-82	FIBA European Cup Winners' Cup	Quarter-finals	(Israel) Hapoel Ramat Gan	111-96	78-95	
1982-83	FIBA European Champions Cup	First round	(Germany) Saturn Köln	75-74	98-97	173-171
1982-83	FIBA European Champions Cup	Second round	(Spain) Real Madrid	89-81	81-111	170-192
1983-84	FIBA Korać Cup	Second round	(Germany) Osnabrück	101-76	58-60	159-136
1983-84	FIBA Korać Cup	Quarter-finals	(France) Olympique Antibes			
1983-84	FIBA Korać Cup	Quarter-finals	(Israel) Maccabi Ramat Gan			
1983-84	FIBA Korać Cup	Quarter-finals	(Italy) Reyer Venezia			
1984-85	FIBA Korać Cup	First round	(Netherlands) Den Helder	80-89	77-80	157-169

== Season-by-season records ==
Season	Division	Tier	Regular Season						Post-Season	Trophy	Cup
Season	Division	Tier	Finish	Played	Wins	Losses	Points	Win %	Post-Season	Trophy	Cup
Sutton
1972-73	NBL	1	3rd	10	6	4	16	0.600			Runners Up
Sutton & Crystal Palace
1973-74	NBL	1	1st	14	13	1	26	0.929			Winners
1974-75	NBL	1	2nd	18	16	2	34	0.889			Runners Up
Crystal Palace
1975-76	NBL	1	1st	18	17	1	35	0.944			Winners
1976-77	NBL	1	1st	18	18	0	26	1.000			Winners
1977-78	NBL	1	1st	18	18	0	36	1.000			Winners
1978-79	NBL	1	2nd	20	16	4	32	0.800	Winners		Runners Up
1979-80	NBL	1	1st	18	18	0	36	1.000	Winners		Winners
1980-81	NBL	1	2nd	18	16	2	32	0.889	Runners Up		Winners
1981-82	NBL	1	1st	22	20	2	40	0.909	Winners		Quarter-finals
1982-83	NBL	1	1st	24	21	3	42	0.875	Runners Up		Semi-finals
1983-84	NBL	1	2nd	36	25	11	50	0.694	Semi-finals		Semi-finals
1984-85	NBL	1	10th	26	10	16	20	0.385	Did not qualify		Quarter-finals
1985-86	NBL	1	5th	28	17	11	33	0.607	Semi-finals		First round
Brunel Crystal Palace
1986-87	NBL	1	4th	24	17	7	34	0.708	Winners		Quarter-finals
Crystal Palace
1987-88	BBL	1	15th	28	2	26	4	0.071	Did not qualify	Pool Stage	Second round
1988-89	BBL	1	11th	20	2	18	4	0.100	Did not qualify	Pool Stage	Quarter-finals
1989-90	NBL	2	7th	22	9	13	18	0.409	Semi-finals		Second round
1990-91	Withdrew from league										
1991-92	NL D3	3	2nd	22	18	4	36	0.818			
1992-93	NL D2	2	3rd	22	16	6	32	0.727			Third round
1993-94	NL D1	2	2nd	18	12	6	24	0.667			Second round
1994-95	NL D1	2	1st	22	21	1	42	0.955			Fourth round
1995-96	NL D1	2	1st	22	22	0	44	1.000			Semi-finals
1996-97	BBL	1	12th	36	5	31	10	0.138	Did not qualify	Pool Stage	Fourth round
1997-98	BBL	1	11th	36	8	28	16	0.222	Did not qualify	Pool Stage	Fourth round

== Notable players ==
Note: Flags indicate national team eligibility at FIBA-sanctioned events. Players may hold other non-FIBA nationalities not displayed.

Criteria

To appear in this section a player must have either:

- Set a club record or won an individual award while at the club
- Played at least one official international match for their national team at any time
- Played at least one official NBA match at any time.

- (United States) (United Kingdom) Alton Byrd
- (United States) Mark Saiers
- (United States) Alan Baillie
- (United Kingdom) Paul Stimpson
- (United Kingdom) Dan Lloyd
- (United States) Pete Jeremich
- (United Kingdom) Mick Bett
- (United States) Jim Guymon
- (United States) Bob Roma
- (United Kingdom) Paul Philp
- (United Kingdom) Barry Huxley (Capt.)
- (United Kingdom) Richard Scantlebury
- (United Kingdom) Neill Rickets
- (United Kingdom) Tim Lewis
- (United Kingdom) Graham Hill
- (United Kingdom) Neil Clark
- (United Kingdom) Andrew Powlesland
- (United Kingdom) Adrian Cummings
- (United States) John Johnson
- (United States) Tom Seaman
- (United States) Bubba Jennings
- (United Kingdom) Joel Moore
- (United Kingdom) Joe White
- (United Kingdom) Trevor Anderson
- (United Kingdom) Michael Hayles
- (Denmark) Flemming Wich

== See also ==
- British Basketball League
- London Towers
- List of English National Basketball League seasons
