= Manchester Giants (1975–2001) =

- League: British Basketball League
- Established: 1973
- Folded: 1987-1989 (existed as Manchester Eagles); 2001
- History: Manchester Giants; 1973–2001
- Location: Manchester, Greater Manchester
- Team colours: Dark Green, White and Black
- Ownership: Montgomery Sports Ltd.
Home	Away

Manchester Giants was a professional basketball team based in Manchester, England. During its existence, the team won the Trophy in 1999 and the BBL Championship in 2000. The tenure of American coach Nick Nurse, which included those two seasons, was the most successful period in the club's history. The franchise folded 9 games into the 2001–02 season.

A revival effort headed by former player and coach Jeff Jones to return the Giants name to the British Basketball League was put together in 2011. The bid was formally accepted on 19 June 2012, marking a return of the Giants and Manchester-based professional basketball for the first time in 11 years. The newly re-created Manchester Giants started playing in the 2012–13 season.

== Franchise history ==
=== Manchester Giants ===
The original Manchester Giants were based in Sale, developing out of Stretford Basketball Club and were sponsored for many years by ATS. They were the first northern team to challenge the southern dominance of the early national league years competing in the league for the first time during the 1973–74 National Basketball League season and later becoming league runners up in 1976–77.

Home grown talent at this time include Steve Latham, Dick Powell, Ken Walton, Trevor Pountain and John Nono. Amongst the US stars to play for the Giants was Jeff Jones, who took to the court for the first time in that 1976 season and regularly netted over 400 points, after a successful college career at BNC Oklahoma. He quickly set about developing junior talent in the area. At that time Giants were the second best attended club in the league, averaging 550 people a game in the cramped Sale venue. Other early imports included Vince Lackner, Mark Badger, John Miller and Steve Irion.

Outgrowing Sale Leisure Centre, the club moved first to Stretford and then to Altrincham Leisure Centre where they had many successful years. Other notable imports over the years included Vince Brookins and Craig Robinson (brother of US First Lady Michelle Obama).

=== Merger with Manchester United ===
Manchester United wanted to develop the continental idea of sporting clubs and to set up a dominant basketball club. The United side failed to attract fans in large numbers and so, despite strong opposition from their fans, the Giants were "merged" with them.

Two barren seasons followed the United title win and the United experiment having failed, the franchise was bought by a group of local businessmen in 1988, who changed the team name to the Manchester Eagles.

Jeff Jones returned to coach the team, the start of a reign (1988–94) that would make him the longest-serving coaching in franchise history. Coach Jones finished fifth in his first season as well as taking the team to the National Cup Final where they lost 87–75 to Bracknell. A year later, he led Manchester to a second-placed finish in the League and the Final of the Trophy. On both occasions, the all-conquering Kingston team edged out Manchester. That 1989–90 team included memorable players such as Jason Fogerty, Tony Penny, Jerry Johnson, Dave Gardner, Kris Kearney, Keith Ramsey and Kevin St. Kitts—the last four of whom are among the dozen players to have hit 1,000 career points for the franchise over the past 14 years.

The supporters of the Giants set up Stockport Giants, an all English club, who played successfully for four years winning the English Central League, the North West Counties League before securing a place in the lower divisions of the National League, and reaching the National League cup quarter finals. Olympic City Giants, established to try to promote Manchester's Olympic bid, was short-lived and by the 1989–90 season Manchester and Giants merged again, although, apart from another Trophy Final defeat by Kingston in 1991, the new name did not appear to bring any new luck with it.

=== New backing ===
By 1993, the Giants had been purchased by Cook Group. During this period, the team relocated to several venues, including the Armitage Centre (Fallowfield), the Velodrome, and later the Manchester Evening News Arena at the start of the 1995–96 season.

There was a great influx of American talent due to new league rules and the club utilised its American ties through the Cook Group to bring in Indiana University graduates Joe Hillman and Mark Robinson as well as ex-NBA players such as Robert Churchwell and Brian Rowsom in the 1997–98 season.

The new owners were putting together a new look team and brought in respected US college coach Mike Hanks for the start of the 1994–95 season. Although they only finished fourth and fifth in Coach Hanks' two seasons, the Giants were Play-off runners-up, losing the Wembley Championship Final to Worthing by a narrow 77–73 score line.

However, the Giants did make it into the record books in their first year at the Arena when they attracted an amazing 14,251 fans to their season opener against the London Leopards – still the biggest crowd to ever watch a basketball match in Britain. By the end of that season, Coach Hanks was out and the coach with the most successful record in club history was back—Joe Whelton. Unfortunately, he could not recapture the success of yesteryear in his one-season and made way for Jim Brandon in 1997–98. However, he too found the task difficult although there was the consolation of a spirited end to the season and a run to the Wembley Championships where the Giants put up a good performance before losing their semi-final with Birmingham 91–80.

Brandon did win his final game as Giants' head coach as they defeated London in the third-place game—more significantly Brandon started an all-English team (Matt Hogarth, Michael Bernard, Jason Swaine, Danny Craven and Ronnie Baker).

The start of the 1998–99 season saw the beginning of a new era for the Manchester Giants, one of the biggest names in the history of British basketball.

After several disappointing years in which the Giants struggled to live up to the expectations of their huge support, Nick Nurse was brought back to British basketball to try to end the team's 12-year wait for a trophy. It worked as the Giants claimed the inaugural Dairylea Dunkers Championship and Northern Conference title in 2000, plus the 1999 uni-ball Trophy championship. Manchester won 87 of its 106 games in the last two seasons, winning a BBL record 45 in 1999–2000.

American Nurse, who coached the Birmingham Bullets to the Wembley Championship two years earlier, had also made his mark in European basketball with top Belgian team B.C. Oostende before taking the helm at the new-look Giants. Nurse's brief was simple – restore the Manchester Giants to their winning ways and reward their thousands of loyal fans by taking them to the top of the table. Coach Nurse wasted no time in shooting for that goal and quickly assembled a star-studded cast of proven Budweiser League players. He moved to secure the services of Tony Dorsey, whom he had coached in his Birmingham days, before looking south to sign Greater London Leopards' pair John White and Makeba Perry, who had been with the Giants two seasons earlier, along with Thames Valley Tigers' Tony Holley. White, Dorsey and Holley had all been selected to the end of season All-Star team and played in the League All-Star Games, while Dorsey (1995–96) and White (1996–97) also came to Manchester with League MVP awards to their names. Dorsey and White would both be selected to the end of season All-Star team in 1998–99.

Nurse had the players in place and the season got off to a roaring start with the Giants at the top of the table within the opening months, a major improvement over recent seasons. He has continued this run of success with a franchise-record 45–7 win–loss record, winning the inaugural Dairylea Dunkers Northern Conference Championship, reaching the National Cup, uni-ball Trophy and Dairylea Dunkers championship games in 1999–2000. Only Kingston (1990, 1992) and London Towers (1996) have reached all three championship games in the same BBL season.

The team were stunned soon after celebrating its championship when a senior director representing ownership informed the team and management Cook Group could no longer afford to fund the Giants.

=== Decline ===
With no owner and failure to offset the high cost of renting the Manchester Evening News Arena by gate receipts forced the team to return to their former home of the National Cycling Centre, otherwise known as Manchester Velodrome, towards the end of the 2000/01 season. In the 2001/02 season, all home games were played at the Eastlands venue. Whilst the arena was more flexible and cheaper to hire, it lacked the customer facilities of the MEN Arena and stood alone in the wastelands of East Manchester, next to the land which would later see the City of Manchester Stadium built. The lack of attractions in the area or public transport connections to it ultimately put the seal on the demise of the franchise.

The franchise went through an abortive rebirth in the hands of the Montgomery Sports Group, creators of the Sheffield Sharks, before backing failed to surface and the franchise was ignominiously 'deleted' in 2001 by its ultimate owners, the BBL – leaving the second largest urban area in the UK with no representation in the league. The team actually played 9 games of the 2001–02 season before folding, finishing with a 2–7 record.

== Season-by-season records ==
Season	Division	Tier	Regular Season						Post-Season	Trophy	Cup
Season	Division	Tier	Finish	Played	Wins	Losses	Points	Win %	Post-Season	Trophy	Cup
Manchester Giants
1973-74	NBL	1	8th	14	0	14	14	0.000	-	-	
1974-75	NBL	1	8th	18	7	11	14	0.389	-	-	
1975-76	NBL	1	5th	18	8	10	16	0.444	-	-	
1976-77	NBL	1	2nd	18	15	3	30	0.833	-	-	
1977-78	NBL	1	3rd						-	-	
1978-79	NBL	1	8th	20	7	13	14	0.350	Did not qualify	-	
1979-80	NBL	1	8th	18	3	15	6	0.167	Did not qualify	-	
Trafford Giants
1980-81	NBL	1	8th	18	5	13	10	0.278	Did not qualify	-	1st round
Manchester Giants
1981-82	NBL	1	11th	22	5	17	10	0.227	Did not qualify	-	Quarter-finals
1982-83	NBL	1	11th	24	4	20	8	0.167	Did not qualify	-	1st round
1983-84	NBL	1	7th	36	18	18	36	0.500	Did not qualify	-	2nd round
1984-85	NBL	1	3rd	26	18	8	36	0.692	Quarter-finals	-	Semi-finals
1985-86	NBL	1	3rd	28	18	10	36	0.643	Quarter-finals	-	Quarter-finals
Manchester United
1986-87	NBL	1	3rd	24	19	5	38	0.792	Semi-finals	-	Semi-finals
1987-88	BBL	1	4th	28	21	7	42	0.750	Semi-finals	Pool Stage	Semi-finals
Manchester Eagles
1988-89	BBL	1	5th	20	13	7	26	0.650	Quarter-finals	Quarter-finals	Runners Up
Manchester Giants
1989-90	BBL	1	2nd	28	21	7	42	0.750	Semi-finals	Runners Up	Quarter-finals
1990-91	BBL	1	6th	24	12	12	24	0.500	Quarter-finals	Runners Up	Quarter-finals
1991-92	BBL	1	9th	30	9	21	18	0.300	Did not qualify	Semi-finals	3rd round
1992-93	BBL	1	9th	33	12	21	24	0.363	Did not qualify	Pool Stage	Quarter-finals
1993-94	BBL	1	3rd	36	29	7	58	0.805	Semi-finals	Runners Up	Semi-finals
1994-95	BBL	1	4th	36	26	10	52	0.722	Runners Up	Pool Stage	4th round
1995-96	BBL	1	5th	36	21	15	42	0.583	Semi-finals	Quarter-finals	Quarter-finals
1996-97	BBL	1	6th	36	22	14	44	0.611	Quarter-finals	Pool Stage	Quarter-finals
1997-98	BBL	1	8th	36	15	21	30	0.416	Semi-finals	Quarter-finals	Quarter-finals
1998-99	BBL	1	2nd	36	30	6	60	0.833	Semi-finals	Winners, beating Derby	Quarter-finals
1999-00	BBL N	1	1st	36	31	5	62	0.861	Winners, beating Birmingham	Runners Up	Runners Up
2000-01	BBL N	1	5th	36	15	21	30	0.416	Did not qualify	Pool Stage	Quarter-finals
2001-02	BBL N	1	-	9	2	7	-	-	-	-	-
