= Manchester Eagles =

- League: British Basketball League
- Established: 1975
- Folded: 1989 (merged and became Manchester Giants)
- History: Stockport Belgrade; 1975–1981; Warrington Vikings; 1981–1984; Manchester United; 1985–1988; Manchester Eagles; 1988–1989
- Location: Manchester, Greater Manchester

Manchester Eagles (previously known as Manchester United) was a basketball team from Manchester, England. The club was bought out by Manchester United after settling in Manchester following a series of relocations. The club had several mergers, creating a complicated overlapping history with the Manchester Giants, the last episode of which de facto ended its existence in 1989 and reinstated the Giants.

== History ==
=== Stockport Basketeers ===
Stockport Basketeers were based at Peel Moat in Heaton Moor. They were created in 1975 and had, in Bill Beswick, one of the UK's best coaches in the history of the sport.

After finishing second in Division 2 that inaugural season, Coach Beswick led the Basketeers to promotion in 1977, compiling an impressive 18–2 record, the best in franchise history. Their US players included Bob Martin, one of the best shooting guards ever to play in the league. He once scored 52 points in a losing game against ATS Giants.

The next four years proved to be a period of consolidation for the team in the top division of British basketball with a first trip to Europe, in the Korac Cup.

=== Warrington Vikings ===
By the 1981–82 season, the Stockport club took the decision to move away from their fan base to the new Spectrum Arena in Warrington. During the 1982–83 season, Beswick left the club, replaced on an interim basis by Craig Lynch. The arrival of Joe Whelton at the start of the following season proved to be the turning point in the team's history. With players like Jeff Jones, Wil Brown, Ed Bona, Steve Latham, Phil Brazil, Paul Gervais, David Lloyd; an assistant on the 1997–98 team – and Kevin Penny, the team finished third in the League and lost the Championship Final 70–64 to Solent.

=== Manchester United ===
Halfway through the following season, another major turning point occurred in the Vikings' eventful history when Manchester United F.C. bought the team. Coach Whelton also played a part in Manchester's sudden upturn in fortunes, making the shrewd signing of Colin Irish who was brilliant in the 1985 Championship Final win over Kingston, scoring 47 points in a 109–97 victory. Manchester United then took control of the other Manchester Club the Giants. NBA Hall of Famer, Stockport-born John Amaechi represented United’s basketball team at this time before later making it big in the US. Players of the calibre of Tom Brown and Dave Gardner, who started the 1998–99 season as an assistant to Nick Nurse, were also added to the roster for the start of the 1985–86 season in which a club record 23 straight wins helped Manchester United recover from a shaky start to storm to the National League title and the professional era.

=== Merger with Manchester Giants ===
Manchester United wanted to develop the continental idea of sporting clubs and to set up a dominant basketball club. The United side failed to attract fans in large numbers and so, despite strong opposition from their fans, the Giants were "merged" with them.

Two barren seasons followed the United title win and the United experiment having failed, the franchise was bought by a group of local businessmen in 1988, who changed the team name to the Manchester Eagles.

Jeff Jones returned to coach the team, the start of a reign (1988–94) that would make him the longest-serving coaching in franchise history. Coach Jones finished fifth in his first season as well as taking the team to the National Cup Final where they lost 87–75 to Bracknell. A year later, he led Manchester to a second-placed finish in the League and the Final of the Trophy. On both occasions, the all-conquering Kingston team edged out Manchester. That 1989–90 team included memorable players such as Jason Fogerty, Tony Penny, Jerry Johnson, Dave Gardner, Kris Kearney, Keith Ramsey and Kevin St. Kitts – the last four of whom are among the dozen players to have hit 1,000 career points for the franchise over the past 14 years.

=== Stockport Giants and Olympic City Giants ===
The supporters of the Giants set up Stockport Giants, an all English club, who played successfully for four years winning the English Central League, the North West Counties League before securing a place in the lower divisions of the National League, and reaching the National League cup quarter finals. Meanwhile, in an attempt to promote Manchester's Olympic bid a team called Olympic City Giants was formed but in 1989 after encountering several financial difficulties, the Olympic City Giants (as was their official name) formally merged with Manchester Eagles to become Manchester Giants, marking a return of the famous name after a three-year absence, following a merger between the original Manchester Giants and Manchester United in 1986.
