= BBL Coach of the Year Award =

British basketball award

The British Basketball League Coach of the Year award is an annual award presented to head coaches in the British Basketball League, and has been awarded at the end of every campaign since the 1987–1988 season. The award is decided by a panel consisting of each of the league's head coaches who submit one vote each at the end of the regular season, and the coach with the most votes is presented with the award. The award is sponsored by Molten. Rob Paternostro has won the award the most times, collecting it on seven occasions. Kevin Cadle won the award five times and is listed in the Guinness Book of Records for the coaching the "most successful team ever in British Sport 1989–90".

== Winners ==
Season	Coach	Team
1987–88	(United States) Gary Johnson	Calderdale Explorers
1988–89	(United States) (United Kingdom) Kevin Cadle	Glasgow Rangers
1989–90	(United States) (United Kingdom) Kevin Cadle (2)	Kingston Kings
1990–91	(United States) (United Kingdom) Kevin Cadle (3)	Kingston Kings
1991–92	(United States) (United Kingdom) Kevin Cadle (4)	Kingston Kings
1992–93	(United Kingdom) Mick Bett	Thames Valley Tigers
1993–94	(United Kingdom) Mick Bett (2)	Thames Valley Tigers
1994–95	(United States) Jim Brandon	Sheffield Sharks
1995–96	(United States) (United Kingdom) Kevin Cadle (5)	London Towers
1996–97	(United Kingdom) Mike Burton	Chester Jets
1997–98	(United States) Billy Mims	Greater London Leopards
1998–99	(United States) Chris Finch	Sheffield Sharks
1999–00	(United States) Nick Nurse	Manchester Giants
2000–01	(United Kingdom) Robbie Peers	Chester Jets
2001–02	(United Kingdom) Robbie Peers (2)	Chester Jets
2002–03	(United States) Chris Finch (2)	Sheffield Sharks
2003–04	(United States) Nick Nurse (2)	Brighton Bears
2004–05	(United States) (United Kingdom) Fabulous Flournoy	Newcastle Eagles
2005–06	(United States) (United Kingdom) Fabulous Flournoy (2)	Newcastle Eagles
2006–07	(United Kingdom) Paul James	Guildford Heat
2007–08	(United Kingdom) Vince Macaulay	Milton Keynes Lions
2008–09	(United States) (Italy) Rob Paternostro	Leicester Riders
2009–10	(United States) (United Kingdom) Fabulous Flournoy (3)	Newcastle Eagles
2010–11	(United Kingdom) Tony Garbelotto	Mersey Tigers
2011–12	(United States) (United Kingdom) Fabulous Flournoy (4)	Newcastle Eagles
2012–13	(United States) (Italy) Rob Paternostro (2)	Leicester Riders
2013–14	(United States) (United Kingdom) Fabulous Flournoy (5)	Newcastle Eagles
2014–15	(Greece) Andreas Kapoulas	Bristol Flyers
2015-16	(United States) (Italy) Rob Paternostro (3)	Leicester Riders
2016-17	(United States) (Italy) Rob Paternostro (4)	Leicester Riders
2017-18	(United States) (Italy) Rob Paternostro (5)	Leicester Riders
2018-19	(United Kingdom) Vince Macaulay (2)	London Lions
2019-20	Not awarded	
2020-21	(United States) (Italy) Rob Paternostro (6)	Leicester Riders
2021-22	(United States) (Italy) Rob Paternostro (7)	Leicester Riders

- There was no winner for the 2019–20 season after the season's cancellation due to the COVID-19 pandemic.
