= BBL Most Valuable Player Award =

Basketball award

The British Basketball League Most Valuable Player award was an annual award of the United Kingdom's top professional basketball league, the British Basketball League. It was awarded to the league's top performing player throughout the duration of the season. The award was decided by a panel consisting of each of the League's team's head coaches, who submit one vote each at the end of the regular season, and the player with the most votes was presented with the award. Only on one occasion - the 2006–2007 season - was the award been shared between two players (Jeff Bonds and Brian Dux) due to a tie in the voting. Six players - Alton Byrd, Tony Dorsey, Trey Moore and Andrew Sullivan, Rahmon Fletcher, Justin Robinson - have won the award twice, whilst only three British-born players have won the award, namely Roger Huggins, Andrew Sullivan, and Justin Robinson.

== Winners ==
Season	Player	Team
1987–88	(United States) Daryl Thomas	Hemel Royals
1988–89	(United States) Alan Cunningham	Glasgow Rangers
1989–90	(United States) (United Kingdom) Clyde Vaughan	Sunderland Saints
1990–91	(United States) Alton Byrd	Kingston Kings
1991–92	(United States) Alton Byrd (x2)	Kingston Kings
1992–93	(United States) Colin Irish	Worthing Bears
1993–94	(Barbados) (United Kingdom) Nigel Lloyd	Thames Valley Tigers
1994–95	(United Kingdom) Roger Huggins	Sheffield Sharks
1995–96	(United States) (United Kingdom) Tony Dorsey	Birmingham Bullets
1996–97	(United States) John White	Leopards
1997–98	(United States) Eric Burks	Greater London Leopards
1998–99	(United States) Terrell Myers	Sheffield Sharks
1999–00	(United States) (United Kingdom) Tony Dorsey (x2)	Manchester Giants
2000–01	(United States) Loren Meyer	Chester Jets
2001–02	(United States) John Thomas	Chester Jets
2002–03	(United States) Kenny Gregory	Chester Jets
2003–04	(United States) Jerry Williams	Scottish Rocks
2004–05	(United States) Trey Moore	Chester Jets
2005–06	(United Kingdom) Andrew Sullivan	Newcastle Eagles
2006–07	(United States) (Spain) Jeff Bonds	Sheffield Sharks
2006–07	(United States) Brian Dux	Guildford Heat
2007–08	(United States) Lynard Stewart	Newcastle Eagles
2008–09	(United States) Trey Moore (x2)	Newcastle Eagles
2009–10	(United States) Mike Cook	Sheffield Sharks
2010–11	(United States) Jeremy Bell	Cheshire Jets
2011–12	(United States) Joe Chapman	Newcastle Eagles
2012–13	(United Kingdom) Andrew Sullivan (x2)	Leicester Riders
2013–14	(United States) Zaire Taylor	Worcester Wolves
2014–15	(United Kingdom) Charles Smith	Newcastle Eagles
2015–16	(United States) Rahmon Fletcher	Newcastle Eagles
2016–17	(United States) Rahmon Fletcher (x2)	Newcastle Eagles
2017–18	(United Kingdom) Justin Robinson	London Lions
2018–19	(United Kingdom) Justin Robinson (x2)	London Lions
2020–21	(United States) Geno Crandall	Leicester Riders
2021–22	(United States) Geno Crandall (x2)	Leicester Riders
2022–23	(United States) Sam Dekker	London Lions
2023–24	(United States) Matt Morgan	London Lions

== Players with most awards ==
Player	Editions	Notes
(United States) Trey Moore	2	2005, 2009
(United States) Rahmon Fletcher	2	2016, 2017
(United States) Alton Byrd	2	1991, 1992
(United States) (United Kingdom) Tony Dorsey	2	1996, 2000
(United States) Geno Crandall	2	2021, 2022
(United Kingdom) Justin Robinson	2	2018, 2019
(United Kingdom) Drew Sullivan	2	2006, 2013
