= List of British Basketball League seasons =

A list of British Basketball League seasons since inception of the league in 1987:

Season	League Championship	Playoffs	Cup	Trophy	Most Valuable Player	Coach of the Year
Carlsberg Basketball League
1987–88	Portsmouth	Livingston	n/a (Note: The BBL Cup was founded in 2003. From 1987 until 2003, all British Basketball League teams competed in the National Cup.)	Livingston	Darryl Thomas (Hemel Royals)	Gary Johnson (Calderdale Explorers)
1988–89	Glasgow Rangers	Glasgow Rangers	n/a	Bracknell Tigers	Alan Cunningham (Glasgow Rangers)	Kevin Cadle (Glasgow Rangers)
1989–90	Kingston Kings	Kingston Kings	n/a	Kingston Kings	Clyde Vaughan (Sunderland Saints)	Kevin Cadle (Kingston Kings)
1990–91	Kingston Kings	Kingston Kings	n/a	Kingston Kings	Alton Byrd (Kingston Kings)	Kevin Cadle (Kingston Kings)
1991–92	Kingston Kings	Kingston Kings	n/a	Kingston Kings	Alton Byrd (Kingston Kings)	Kevin Cadle (Kingston Kings)
1992–93	Worthing Bears	Worthing Bears	n/a	Thames Valley Tigers	Colin Irish (Worthing Bears)	Mick Bett (Thames Valley Tigers)
Budweiser Basketball League
1993–94	Thames Valley Tigers	Worthing Bears	n/a	Thames Valley Tigers	Nigel Lloyd (Thames Valley Tigers)	Mick Bett (Thames Valley Tigers)
1994–95	Sheffield Sharks	Worthing Bears	n/a	Thames Valley Tigers	Roger Huggins (Sheffield Sharks)	Jim Brandon (Sheffield Sharks)
1995–96	London Towers	Birmingham Bullets	n/a	London Towers	Tony Dorsey (Birmingham Bullets)	Kevin Cadle (London Towers)
1996–97	Leopards	London Towers	n/a	London Towers	John White (Leopards)	Mike Burton (Chester Jets)
1997–98	Greater London Leopards	Birmingham Bullets	n/a	Sheffield Sharks	Eric Burks (Greater London Leopards)	Billy Mims (Greater London Leopards)
1998–99	Sheffield Sharks	London Towers	n/a	Manchester Giants	Terrell Myers (Sheffield Sharks)	Chris Finch (Sheffield Sharks)
Dairylea Dunkers Championship
1999–00	North: Manchester Giants (Note: From 1999 to 2002, the Championship was organised into two regional Conferences; North and South. During these years a winner was declared from each Conference.); South: London Towers	Manchester Giants	n/a	London Towers	Tony Dorsey (Manchester Giants)	Nick Nurse (Manchester Giants)
British Basketball League
2000–01	North: Sheffield Sharks; South: London Towers	Leicester Riders	n/a	Chester Jets	Loren Meyer (Chester Jets)	Robbie Peers (London Towers)
2001–02	North: Chester Jets; South: London Towers	Chester Jets	n/a	Chester Jets	John Thomas (Chester Jets)	Robbie Peers (London Towers)
2002–03	Sheffield Sharks	Scottish Rocks	n/a	Chester Jets	Kenny Gregory (Chester Jets)	Chris Finch (Sheffield Sharks)
2003–04	Brighton Bears	Sheffield Sharks	Sheffield Sharks	Chester Jets	Jerry Williams (Scottish Rocks)	Nick Nurse (Brighton Bears)
2004–05	Chester Jets	Newcastle Eagles	Brighton Bears	Newcastle Eagles	Trey Moore (Chester Jets)	Fab Flournoy (Newcastle Eagles)
2005–06	Newcastle Eagles	Newcastle Eagles	Newcastle Eagles	Newcastle Eagles	Andrew Sullivan (Newcastle Eagles)	Fab Flournoy (Newcastle Eagles)
2006–07	Guildford Heat	Newcastle Eagles	Guildford Heat	Plymouth Raiders	Jeff Bonds (Sheffield Sharks); Brian Dux (Guildford Heat)	Paul James (Guildford Heat)
2007–08	Newcastle Eagles	Guildford Heat	Milton Keynes Lions	Guildford Heat	Lynard Stewart (Newcastle Eagles)	Vince Macaulay (MK Lions)
2008–09	Newcastle Eagles	Newcastle Eagles	Everton Tigers	Newcastle Eagles	Trey Moore (Newcastle Eagles)	Rob Paternostro (Leicester Riders)
2009–10	Newcastle Eagles	Everton Tigers	Sheffield Sharks	Newcastle Eagles	Mike Cook (Sheffield Sharks)	Fab Flournoy (Newcastle Eagles)
2010–11	Mersey Tigers	Mersey Tigers	Sheffield Sharks	Mersey Tigers	Jeremy Bell (Cheshire Jets)	Tony Garbelotto (Mersey Tigers)
2011–12	Newcastle Eagles	Newcastle Eagles	Newcastle Eagles	Newcastle Eagles	Joe Chapman (Newcastle Eagles)	Fab Flournoy (Newcastle Eagles)
2012–13	Leicester Riders	Leicester Riders	Leicester Riders	Sheffield Sharks	Andrew Sullivan (Leicester Riders)	Rob Paternostro (Leicester Riders)
2013–14	Newcastle Eagles	Worcester Wolves	Leicester Riders	Worcester Wolves	Zaire Taylor (Worcester Wolves)	Fab Flournoy (Newcastle Eagles)
2014–15	Newcastle Eagles	Newcastle Eagles	Newcastle Eagles	Newcastle Eagles	Charles Smith (Newcastle Eagles)	Andreas Kapoulas (Bristol Flyers)
2015–16	Leicester Riders	Sheffield Sharks	Newcastle Eagles	Leicester Riders	Rahmon Fletcher (Newcastle Eagles)	Rob Paternostro (Leicester Riders)
2016–17	Leicester Riders	Leicester Riders	Newcastle Eagles	Leicester Riders	Rahmon Fletcher (Newcastle Eagles)	Rob Paternostro (Leicester Riders)
2017–18	Leicester Riders	Leicester Riders	Cheshire Phoenix	Leicester Riders	Justin Robinson (London Lions)	Rob Paternostro (Leicester Riders)
2018–19	London Lions	Leicester Riders	London Lions	London City Royals	Justin Robinson (London Lions)	Vince Macaulay (London Lions)
2019–20	Season cancelled (Note: Season cancelled due to COVID-19 pandemic.)	n/a	Worcester Wolves	Newcastle Eagles	n/a	n/a
2020–21	Leicester Riders	Newcastle Eagles	Newcastle Eagles	London Lions	Geno Crandall (Leicester Riders)	Rob Paternostro (Leicester Riders)
2021–22	Leicester Riders	Leicester Riders	Leicester Riders	Cheshire Phoenix	Geno Crandall (Leicester Riders)	Rob Paternostro (Leicester Riders)
2022–23	London Lions	London Lions	London Lions	Caledonia Gladiators	Sam Dekker (London Lions)	Ryan Schmidt (London Lions)
2023–24	London Lions	London Lions	n/a (Note: The BBL Cup competition was disbanded following the 2022–23 season.)	Cheshire Phoenix	Matt Morgan (London Lions)	Ben Thomas (Cheshire Phoenix)
Super League Basketball
2024–25	London Lions	Leicester Riders	Sheffield Sharks	Newcastle Eagles	Aaryn Rai (London Lions)	Petar Božić (London Lions)
2025–26	London Lions	London Lions	London Lions	London Lions	Patrick Robinson (Cheshire Phoenix)	Tautvydas Sabonis (London Lions)

== See also ==
- Super League Basketball
- British Basketball League
- List of English National Basketball League seasons
