= 1993–94 British Basketball League season =

1993–94 BBL season
- League: British Basketball League
- Sport: Basketball

Roll of Honour
- BBL champions: Thames Valley Tigers
- Play Off's champions: Worthing Bears
- National Cup champions: Worthing Bears
- BBL Trophy champions: Thames Valley Tigers

British Basketball League seasons
- ← 1992–93 1994–95 →

The 1993–94 BBL season was known as the Budweiser League for sponsorship reasons. The season featured a total of 13 teams, playing 36 games each.

The BBL secured a three year £1 million sponsorship deal with Budweiser and the divisions were re-organised once again. The Budweiser League would be tier one with the National League Division's below. The Budweiser League increased in number with the addition of the Division One champions Doncaster Panthers. The Cheshire Jets became the Chester Jets.

Thames Valley Tigers claimed the League Trophy and stormed to the regular season title, however the Bracknell-based side suffered a shock defeat to Derby Bucks and saw them eliminated in the Quarter-final of the Budweiser Championship Play-offs. Nevertheless, Tigers' Nigel Lloyd and Mick Bett were both awarded accolades as Most Valuable Player and Coach of the Year respectively. Worthing Bears also secured a double success by winning the play-offs and securing the National Cup.

== Budweiser League Championship (Tier 1) ==
=== Final standings ===
Pos	Team	Pld	W	L	%	Pts
1	Thames Valley Tigers	36	31	5	0.861	62
2	Worthing Bears	36	30	6	0.833	60
3	Manchester Giants	36	29	7	0.805	58
4	Guildford Kings	36	24	12	0.667	48
5	London Towers	36	21	15	0.583	42
6	Birmingham Bullets	36	21	15	0.583	42
7	Leicester City Riders	36	20	16	0.555	40
8	Derby Bucks	36	17	19	0.473	34
9	Doncaster Panthers	36	13	23	0.362	26
10	Sunderland Scorpions	36	13	23	0.362	26
11	Chester Jets	36	11	25	0.305	22
12	Hemel Royals	36	3	33	0.083	6
13	Oldham Celtics	36	1	35	0.028	2

= League winners
= Qualified for the play-offs

=== Playoffs ===
==== Quarter-finals ====
(1) Thames Valley Tigers vs. (8) Derby Bucks

Derby Bucks	83–81	Thames Valley Tigers

Thames Valley Tigers	79–91	Derby Bucks
Derby win series, 2–0

(2) Worthing Bears vs. (7) Leicester City Riders

Leicester City Riders	83–96	Worthing Bears

Worthing Bears	104–77	Leicester City Riders
Worthing win series, 2–0

(3) Manchester Giants vs. (6) Birmingham Bullets

Birmingham Bullets	76–93	Manchester Giants

Manchester Giants	90–88	Birmingham Bullets
Manchester win series, 2–0

(4) Guildford Kings vs. (5) London Towers

London Towers	60–61	Guildford Kings

Guildford Kings	77–79	London Towers

Guildford Kings	66–53	London Towers
Guildford win series, 2–1

==== Semi-finals ====
Worthing Bears	77–75	Derby Bucks

Wembley Arena, London

Manchester Giants	72–82	Guildford Kings

Wembley Arena, London

==== Final ====
Sky Sports

1 May 1994
16:00

Worthing Bears	71–65	Guildford Kings
Scoring by quarter: 10–15, 17–19, 16–11, 28–20
Pts: Cunningham 16, Irish 15, Harried 12; Rebs: Irish 12; Asts: Harried/Nelson 3 MVP: Colin Irish		Pts: Byrd 15, Politi 13, Cummings/Henlan 12, Rebs: Henlan 11; Asts: Byrd 3

Wembley Arena, London
Attendance: 9,000
Worthing Coach Alan Cunningham
Guildford Coach Kevin Cadle

== National League Division 1 (Tier 2) ==
=== Final standings ===
Pos	Team	Pld	W	L	%	Pts
1	Coventry Crusaders	18	16	2	0.889	32
2	Crystal Palace Mavericks	18	12	6	0.667	24
3	Cardiff Heat	18	11	7	0.611	22
4	Sheffield Forgers	18	10	8	0.556	20
5	Brixton TopCats	18	10	8	0.556	20
6	Stockton Mohawks	18	9	9	0.500	18
7	Ware Rebels	18	8	10	0.444	16
8	Solent Stars	18	7	11	0.389	14
9	Bury Lobos	18	4	14	0.222	8
10	Plymouth Raiders	18	3	15	0.167	6

= League winners

== National League Division 2 (Tier 3) ==
=== Final standings ===
Pos	Team	Pld	W	L	%	Pts
1	Nottingham Cobras	20	18	2	0.900	36
2	Chiltern Fastbreak	20	15	5	0.750	30
3	Swindon Sonics	20	13	7	0.650	26
4	Guildford Storm	20	13	7	0.650	26
5	Liverpool Atac	20	12	8	0.600	24
6	Stevenage Phoenix	20	12	8	0.600	24
7	Mid Sussex Magic	20	11	9	0.550	22
8	Northampton 89ers	20	8	12	0.400	16
9	London Elephants	20	4	16	0.200	7*
10	Leicester Falcons	20	3	17	0.150	6
11	Lewisham Lightning	20	1	19	0.050	2

= League winners

== National Cup ==
=== Third round ===
Team 1	Team 2	Score
Derby Bucks	Worthing Bears	80-94
Hemel Hempstead Royals	Thames Valley Tigers	75-98
Sunderland Scorpions	Doncaster Panthers	83-80
Ware Rebels	Leicester City Riders	56-71
Birmingham Bullets	Swindon Sonics	66-54
London Towers	Chester Jets	61-69
Brixton TopCats	Manchester Giants	86-110
Oldham Celtics	Guildford Kings	73-92

=== Quarter-finals ===
Team 1	Team 2	Score
Sunderland Scorpions	Thames Valley Tigers	80-89
Cheshire Jets	Worthing Bears	79-102
Manchester Giants	Birmingham Bullets	99-85
Leicester City Riders	Guildford Kings	55-64

=== Semi-finals ===
Team 1	Team 2	1st Leg	2nd Leg
Manchester Eagles	Thames Valley Tigers	72-93	80-98
Worthing Bears	Guildford Kings	71-68	93-77

=== Final ===
5 March 1994

Worthing Bears	92–83	Thames Valley Tigers
Pts: Nigel Lloyd 21, Peter Scantlebury 17, Michael Hayles 13, Alan Cunningham 12, Colin Irish 12, Tony Holley		Pts: Herman Harried 33, Steve Nelson 20, Cleave Lewis 15

Sheffield Arena
Attendance: ?
Worthing Coach Alan Cunningham
Thames Valley Coach Mick Bett

== League Trophy ==
=== Group stage ===
North Group 1
Team	Pts	Pld	W	L	Percent
1.Leicester City Riders	6	3	3	0	1.000
2.Derby Bucks	2	3	1	2	0.333
3.Doncaster Panthers	2	3	1	2	0.333
4.Chester Jets	2	3	1	2	0.333

North Group 2
Team	Pts	Pld	W	L	Percent
1.Manchester Giants	4	2	2	0	1.000
2.Sunderland Scorpions	2	2	1	1	0.500
3.Oldham Celtics	0	2	0	2	0.000

South Group 1
Team	Pts	Pld	W	L	Percent
1.Worthing Bears	4	2	2	0	1.000
2.London Towers	2	2	1	1	0.500
3.Birmingham Bullets	0	2	0	2	0.000

South Group 2
Team	Pts	Pld	W	L	Percent
1.Thames Valley Tigers	4	2	2	0	1.000
2.Guildford Kings	2	2	1	1	0.500
3.Hemel Royals	0	2	0	2	0.000

=== Semi-finals ===
Manchester Giants vs. Leicester City Riders

Manchester Giants	86–74	Leicester City Riders

Leicester City Riders	84–90	Manchester Giants
Manchester win on aggregate, 176–158

Thames Valley Tigers vs. Worthing Bears

Worthing Bears	94–88	Thames Valley Tigers

Thames Valley Tigers	89–78	Worthing Bears
Thames Valley win on aggregate, 177–172

=== Final ===
16 Jan 1994

Thames Valley Tigers	79–73	Manchester Giants
Pts: Tony Holley 28, Nigel Lloyd, Mike Obaseki		Pts: Trevor Gordon

National Indoor Arena, Birmingham
Attendance: ?
Thames Valley Coach Mick Bett
Manchester Coach Jeff Jones

== Budweiser All-Star Game ==
Sky Sports

March 1994
7.05pm GMT

Report

Northern All-Stars	140–148	Southern All-Stars
Pts: Tyrone Thomas, 26

Granby Halls, Leicester
Attendance: 2,000

Northern All-Stars
Player	Team
(Montserrat) (United Kingdom) Stedroy Baker	Doncaster Panthers
(United States) Russ Saunders	Sunderland Scorpions
(United Kingdom) Steve Merifield	Oldham Celtics
(United States) Gene Maldron	Leicester Riders
(United States) Kurt Samuels	Manchester Giants
(United States) Kevin St. Kitts	Manchester Giants
(United States) John Trezvant	Leicester Riders
(United States) Andy Gardiner	Manchester Giants
(United States) Jason Siemon	Derby Bucks
(United States) (United Kingdom) Trevor Gordon	Manchester Giants
(United Kingdom) Alan Bannister	Chester Jets
Coach
(United States) Jerry Jenkins	Leicester Riders

Southern All-Stars
Player	Team
(United States) Allen Koochof	London Lions
(United Kingdom) Karl Brown	Guildford Kings
(Barbados) (United Kingdom) Nigel Lloyd	Thames Valley Tigers
(United Kingdom) (Nigeria) Solomon Ayinla	
(United Kingdom) Peter Scantlebury	Thames Valley Tigers
(United States) Tony Holley	Thames Valley Tigers
(United Kingdom) Richard Scantlebury	London Towers
(United States) Tyrone Thomas	Birmingham Bullets
(United States) (United Kingdom) Colin Irish	Worthing Bears
(United States) Herman Harried	Worthing Bears
(United States) Damon Harrell	
Coach
(United States) Alan Cunningham	Worthing Bears

== Seasonal awards ==
- Most Valuable Player: Nigel Lloyd (Thames Valley Tigers)
- Coach of the Year: Mick Bett (Thames Valley Tigers)
- All-Star Team:
  - Trevor Gordon (Manchester Giants)
  - Herman Harried (Worthing Bears)
  - Tony Holley (Thames Valley Tigers)
  - Colin Irish (Worthing Bears)
  - Nigel Lloyd (Thames Valley Tigers)
  - Russ Saunders (Sunderland Scorpions)
  - Peter Scantlebury (Thames Valley Tigers)
  - Jason Siemon (Derby Bucks)
  - Tyrone Thomas (Birmingham Bullets)
  - Gene Waldron (Leicester City Riders)

Preceded by 1992–93 season	BBL seasons 1993–94	Succeeded by 1994–95 season
