= 1991–92 British Basketball League season =

1991–92 BBL season
- League: British Basketball League
- Sport: Basketball
- Number of teams: 11

Roll of Honour
- BBL champions: Kingston
- Play Off's champions: Kingston
- National Cup champions: Kingston
- BBL Trophy champions: Kingston

British Basketball League seasons
- ← 1990–91 1992–93 →

The 1991–92 BBL season was the 5th season of the British Basketball League (known as the Carlsberg League for sponsorship reasons) since its establishment in 1987. The season featured an increased number of teams with the additions of the Birmingham Bullets and Cheshire Jets. London Docklands changed their name to London Towers.

Kingston, coached by Kevin Cadle, stormed to success in every domestic competition they entered and completed a clean sweep of the four major competitions, which they had previously accomplished two years earlier. They claimed the Division One title and Play-off crown, were victorious in the League Trophy and the National Cup, whilst Coach Cadle and star player Alton Byrd were awarded as Coach and Player of the Year respectively.

== Carlsberg League Division One (Tier 1) ==
=== Final standings ===
| Pos | Team | Pld | W | L | % | Pts |
|---|---|---|---|---|---|---|
| 1 | Kingston | 30 | 27 | 3 | 0.900 | 54 |
| 2 | Thames Valley Tigers | 30 | 25 | 5 | 0.833 | 50 |
| 3 | Worthing Bears | 30 | 22 | 8 | 0.733 | 44 |
| 4 | London Towers | 30 | 21 | 9 | 0.700 | 42 |
| 5 | Derby Bucks | 30 | 18 | 12 | 0.600 | 36 |
| 6 | Leicester City Riders | 30 | 14 | 16 | 0.467 | 28 |
| 7 | Hemel Royals | 30 | 13 | 17 | 0.433 | 26 |
| 8 | Birmingham Bullets | 30 | 11 | 19 | 0.367 | 22 |
| 9 | Manchester Giants | 30 | 9 | 21 | 0.300 | 18 |
| 10 | Sunderland Saints | 30 | 3 | 27 | 0.100 | 6 |
| 11 | Cheshire Jets | 30 | 2 | 28 | 0.067 | 4 |

| = League winners |
| = Qualified for the play-offs |

=== Playoffs ===
==== Quarter-finals ====
(1) Kingston vs. (8) Birmingham Bullets

| Birmingham Bullets | 80–102 | Kingston |

| Kingston | 98–74 | Birmingham Bullets |
Kingston win series, 2–0

(2) Thames Valley Tigers vs. (7) Hemel Royals

| Hemel Royals | 64–97 | Thames Valley Tigers |

| Thames Valley Tigers | 103–81 | Hemel Royals |
Thames Valley win series, 2–0

(3) Worthing Bears vs. (6) Leicester City Riders

| Leicester City Riders | 90–102 | Worthing Bears |

| Worthing Bears | 123–104 | Leicester City Riders |
Worthing win series, 2–0

(4) London Towers vs. (5) Derby Bucks

| Derby Bucks | 69–78 | London Towers |

| London Towers | 74–73 | Derby Bucks |
London win series, 2–0

==== Semi-finals ====
| Kingston | 87–82 | London Towers |

Wembley Arena, London

| Thames Valley Tigers | 84–74 | Worthing Bears |

Wembley Arena, London

==== Final ====
3 May 1992

| Kingston | 84–67 | Thames Valley Tigers |
| Pts: Russ Saunders 16, Alan Cunningham 13, Carl Miller 12, Alton Byrd 12, Martin-Stephon Henlan 12, Adrian Cummings 11 | | Pts: Nigel Lloyd 30, David Peed 11, Mike Obaseki, Kevin St Kitts |

Wembley Arena, London
Attendance: 7,000
Kingston Coach Kevin Cadle
Thames Valley Coach Andy Gill

== National League Division 2 (Tier 2) ==
=== Final standings ===
| Pos | Team | Pld | W | L | % | Pts |
|---|---|---|---|---|---|---|
| 1 | Oldham Celtics | 22 | 21 | 1 | 0.955 | 42 |
| 2 | Bury Lobos | 22 | 21 | 1 | 0.955 | 42 |
| 3 | Ware Rebels | 22 | 16 | 6 | 0.727 | 32 |
| 4 | Broxbourne | 22 | 13 | 9 | 0.591 | 26 |
| 5 | Brixton TopCats | 22 | 13 | 9 | 0.591 | 26 |
| 6 | Plymouth Raiders | 22 | 13 | 9 | 0.591 | 26 |
| 7 | Doncaster Eagles | 22 | 11 | 11 | 0.500 | 22 |
| 8 | Middlesbrough | 22 | 8 | 14 | 0.364 | 16 |
| 9 | Cardiff Bay Buccaneers | 22 | 6 | 16 | 0.273 | 12 |
| 10 | Greenwich | 22 | 5 | 17 | 0.227 | 10 |
| 11 | Barnsley Generals | 22 | 3 | 19 | 0.136 | 6 |
| 12 | Coventry Flyers | 22 | 2 | 20 | 0.091 | 4 |

| = League winners |

== National League Division 3 (Tier 3) ==
=== Final standings ===
| Pos | Team | Pld | W | L | % | Pts |
|---|---|---|---|---|---|---|
| 1 | Solent Stars | 22 | 20 | 2 | 0.909 | 40 |
| 2 | Crystal Palace | 22 | 18 | 4 | 0.818 | 36 |
| 3 | Leicester Falcons | 22 | 13 | 9 | 0.591 | 26 |
| 4 | Swindon | 22 | 13 | 9 | 0.591 | 26 |
| 5 | Sheffield Forgers | 22 | 11 | 11 | 0.500 | 22 |
| 6 | Cheshire Bulls | 22 | 11 | 11 | 0.500 | 22 |
| 7 | Mid Sussex Magic | 22 | 10 | 12 | 0.455 | 20 |
| 8 | Stevenage Phoenix | 22 | 9 | 13 | 0.409 | 18 |
| 9 | Chiltern Fastbreak | 22 | 9 | 13 | 0.409 | 18 |
| 10 | Sedgefield Racers | 22 | 9 | 13 | 0.409 | 18 |
| 11 | Calderdale Explorers | 22 | 5 | 17 | 0.227 | 10 |
| 12 | North London College | 22 | 4 | 18 | 0.182 | 8 |

| = League winners |

== Coca-Cola National Cup ==
=== Third Round ===
| Bury Lobos | 81–79 | London Towers |

| Oldham Celtics | 90–94 | Birmingham Bullets |

| Doncaster Eagles | 105–73 | Sunderland Saints |

| Chiltern Fastbreak | 72–88 | Kingston Kings |

| Leicester Riders | 136–74 | Ware Rebels |

| Worthing Bears | 129–89 | Cheshire Bulls |

| Hemel Hempstead Royals | 73–83 | Derby Rams |

| Thames Valley Tigers | 115–105 | Trafford Manchester Giants |

=== Quarter-finals ===
| Worthing Bears | 106–73 | Birmingham Bullets |

| Doncaster Eagles | 65–102 | Thames Valley Tigers |

| Bury Lobos | 88–93 | Leicester Riders |

| Derby Rams | 65–94 | Kingston Kings |

=== Semi-finals ===
| Thames Valley Tigers | 100–82 | Leicester Riders |

| Leicester Riders | 81–101 | Thames Valley Tigers |
Thames Valley win 201-163 on agg.

| Worthing Bears | 78–83 | Kingston Kings |

| Kingston Kings | 83–71 | Worthing Bears |
Kingston win 166-149 on agg.

=== Final ===
8 March 1992

| Kingston Kings | 90–71 | Thames Valley Tigers |
| Pts: Colin Irish 18, Carl Miller 17, Martin-Stephon Henlan 14, Alan Cunningham 14, Russ Saunders 10, Alton Byrd, Steve Tomaschek, Adrian Cummings | | Pts: Nigel Lloyd 22, Tony Balogun 12, Mike Obaseki 10, David Peed 10 |

Sheffield Arena
Attendance: ?
Kingston Coach Kevin Cadle
Thames Valley Coach Andy Gill

== NatWest Trophy ==
=== Group stage ===
North Group

| Team | Pts | Pld | W | L | Percent |
|---|---|---|---|---|---|
| 1.Manchester Giants | 4 | 2 | 2 | 0 | 1.000 |
| 2.Cheshire Jets | 2 | 2 | 1 | 1 | 0.500 |
| 3.Sunderland Saints | 0 | 2 | 0 | 2 | 0.000 |

Midlands Group

| Team | Pts | Pld | W | L | Percent |
|---|---|---|---|---|---|
| 1.Leicester City Riders | 6 | 3 | 3 | 0 | 1.000 |
| 2.Birmingham Bullets | 4 | 3 | 2 | 1 | 0.667 |
| 3.Derby Bucks | 2 | 3 | 1 | 2 | 0.333 |
| 4.Hemel Royals | 0 | 3 | 0 | 3 | 0.000 |

South Group

| Team | Pts | Pld | W | L | Percent |
|---|---|---|---|---|---|
| 1.London Towers | 4 | 2 | 2 | 0 | 1.000 |
| 2.Thames Valley Tigers | 2 | 2 | 1 | 1 | 0.500 |
| 3.Worthing Bears | 0 | 2 | 0 | 2 | 0.000 |

Kingston received a bye into the Semi-finals.

=== Semi-finals ===
Manchester Giants vs. Leicester City Riders

| Manchester Giants | 94–114 | Leicester City Riders |

| Leicester City Riders | 89–88 | Manchester Giants |
Leicester win on aggregate, 203–182

Kingston vs. London Towers

| Kingston | 87–67 | London Towers |

| London Towers | 78–77 | Kingston |
Kingston win on aggregate, 164–145

=== Final ===
19 January 1992

| Kingston | 71–68 | Leicester City Riders |
| Pts: Alan Cunningham 22, Russ Saunders 16 | | Pts: Karl Brown 21, Dave Harris 15, Gene Waldron 15 |

National Exhibition Centre, Birmingham
Attendance: ?
Kingston Coach Kevin Cadle
Leicester Coach ?

== Seasonal awards ==
- Most Valuable Player: Alton Byrd (Kingston)
- Coach of the Year: Kevin Cadle (Kingston)
- All-Star Team:
  - Karl Brown (Leicester City Riders)
  - Alton Byrd (Kingston)
  - Alan Cunningham (Kingston)
  - Bryan Heron (Worthing Bears)
  - Larry Koretz (Birmingham Bullets)
  - Nigel Lloyd (Thames Valley Tigers)
  - Mike Obaseki (Thames Valley Tigers)
  - David Peed (Thames Valley Tigers)
  - Russ Saunders (Kingston)
  - Peter Scantlebury (London Towers)

| Preceded by 1990–91 season | BBL seasons 1991–92 | Succeeded by 1992–93 season |
