= 1992–93 British Basketball League season =

1992–93 BBL season
- League: British Basketball League
- Sport: Basketball
- Number of teams: 12

Roll of Honour
- BBL champions: Worthing Bears
- Play Off's champions: Worthing Bears
- National Cup champions: Guildford Kings
- BBL Trophy champions: Thames Valley Tigers

British Basketball League seasons
- ← 1991–92 1993–94 →

The 1992–93 BBL season was the sixth season of the British Basketball League (known as the Carlsberg League for sponsorship reasons) since its establishment in 1987. The first division featuring a total of 12 teams, playing 33 games each increased in number by one following the admittance of the Oldham Celtics. The Kingston Kings moved from the Tolworth Leisure Centre to new home in Guildford at the Spectrum Arena and became the Guildford Kings.

Worthing Bears were the dominant force in the regular season and sustained their momentum in the post-season Play-off, claiming silverware in both competitions. Their closest rivals were Thames Valley Tigers, who had to settle for second place but were able to enjoy some glory by lifting the League Trophy following a win in the final over the Guildford Kings.

== Carlsberg League Division One (Tier 1) ==
=== Final standings ===
Pos	Team	Pld	W	L	%	Pts
1	Worthing Bears	33	31	2	0.939	62
2	Thames Valley Tigers	33	28	5	0.848	56
3	London Towers	33	25	8	0.757	50
4	Guildford Kings	33	25	8	0.757	50
5	Birmingham Bullets	33	17	16	0.515	34
6	Derby Bucks	33	14	19	0.424	28
7	Oldham Celtics	33	14	19	0.424	28
8	Leicester City Riders	33	12	21	0.363	24
9	Manchester Giants	33	12	21	0.363	24
10	Cheshire Jets	33	10	23	0.303	20
11	Sunderland Saints	33	6	27	0.182	12
12	Hemel Royals	33	4	29	0.121	8

= League winners
= Qualified for the play-offs

=== Playoffs ===
==== Quarter-finals ====
(1) Worthing Bears vs. (8) Leicester City Riders

Leicester City Riders	63–84	Worthing Bears

Worthing Bears	94–84	Leicester City Riders
Worthing win series, 2–0

(2) Thames Valley Tigers vs. (7) Oldham Celtics

Oldham Celtics	85–112	Thames Valley Tigers

Thames Valley Tigers	98–86	Oldham Celtics
Thames Valley win series, 2–0

(3) London Towers vs. (6) Derby Bucks

Derby Bucks	93–95 (OT)	London Towers

London Towers	94–99	Derby Bucks

London Towers	97–93	Derby Bucks
London win series, 2–1

(4) Guildford Kings vs. (5) Birmingham Bullets

Birmingham Bullets	92–86	Guildford Kings

Guildford Kings	93–85	Birmingham Bullets

Guildford Kings	82–75	Birmingham Bullets
Guildford win series, 2–1

==== Semi-finals ====
1 May 1993

Worthing Bears	74–73	Guildford Kings

Wembley Arena, London

1 May 1993

Thames Valley Tigers	97–87	London Towers

Wembley Arena, London

==== Final ====
BBC 2

2 May 1993

Worthing Bears	75–74	Thames Valley Tigers
Scoring by half: 44–34, 31–40
Pts: Cleave Lewis 17 (MVP)		Pts: Nigel Lloyd 21

Wembley Arena, London
Attendance: 5,000
Worthing Coach Alan Cunningham
Thames Valley Coach Mick Bett
Referees: Robert Iliffe

== National League Division 2 (Tier 2) ==
=== Final standings ===
Pos	Team	Pld	W	L	%	Pts
1	Doncaster Panthers	22	20	2	0.909	40
2	Middlesbrough	22	17	5	0.773	34
3	Crystal Palace	22	16	6	0.728	32
4	Ware Rebels	22	14	8	0.636	28
5	Cardiff Heat	22	13	9	0.591	26
6	Coventry Crusaders	22	11	11	0.500	22
7	Brixton TopCats	22	11	11	0.500	22
8	Bury Lobos	22	10	12	0.455	20
9	Plymouth Raiders	22	9	13	0.409	18
10	Solent Stars	22	5	17	0.227	10
11	Lewisham Lightning	22	3	19	0.136	6
12	Barnsley Generals	22	3	19	0.136	6

= League winners

== National League Division 3 (Tier 3) ==
=== Final standings ===
Pos	Team	Pld	W	L	%	Pts
1	Sheffield Forgers	20	15	5	0.750	30
2	Sedgefield Racers	20	14	6	0.700	28
3	Liverpool Atac	20	13	7	0.650	26
4	Guildford Storm	20	13	7	0.650	26
5	Swindon Sonics	20	13	7	0.650	26
6	South London Elephants	20	12	8	0.600	24
7	Leicester Falcons	20	11	9	0.550	22
8	Stevenage Phoenix	20	8	12	0.400	16
9	Chiltern Fastbreak	20	6	14	0.300	12
10	Camberley Eagles	20	3	17	0.150	6
11	Mid Sussex Magic	20	2	18	0.100	4

= League winners

== National Cup ==
=== Third round ===
Team 1	Team 2	Score
Derby Bucks	Oldham Celtics	92-84
Hemel Hempstead Royals	Ware Rebels	93-96
Thames Valley Tigers	Sunderland Saints	96-78
Worthing Bears	Plymouth Raiders	131-79
Birmingham Bullets	Manchester Giants	73-82
Cheshire Jets	London Towers	85-74
Doncaster Panthers	Leicester City Riders	88-93
Crystal Palace	Guildford Kings	

=== Quarter-finals ===
Team 1	Team 2	Score
Ware Rebels	Worthing Bears	62-92
Cheshire Jets	Thames Valley Tigers	71-76
Manchester Giants	Guildford Kings	57-91
Derby Bucks	Leicester City Riders	71-115

=== Semi-finals ===
Team 1	Team 2	1st Leg	2nd Leg
Guildford Kings	Thames Valley Tigers	83-81	84-83
Leicester City Riders	Worthing Bears	99-100	77-90

=== Final ===
28 February 1993

Guildford Kings	82–72	Worthing Bears
Pts: Trevor Gordon 24, Carl Miller 20, Karl Brown 10		Pts: Colin Irish 19, Mark Hubbard 18, Mike Spaid 16

Doncaster Dome
Attendance: 2,000
Guildford Coach Kevin Cadle
Worthing Coach Alan Cunningham

== NatWest Trophy ==
=== Group stage ===
North Group 1

Team	Pts	Pld	W	L	Percent
1.Derby Bucks	4	2	2	0	1.000
2.Sunderland Saints	2	2	1	1	0.500
3.Oldham Celtics	0	2	0	2	0.000

North Group 2

Team	Pts	Pld	W	L	Percent
1.Leicester City Riders	4	2	2	0	1.000
2.Manchester Giants	2	2	1	1	0.500
3.Chester Jets	0	2	0	2	0.000

South Group 1

Team	Pts	Pld	W	L	Percent
1.Thames Valley Tigers	4	2	2	0	1.000
2.Birmingham Bullets	2	2	1	1	0.500
3.London Towers	0	2	0	2	0.000

South Group 2

Team	Pts	Pld	W	L	Percent
1.Guildford Kings	4	2	2	0	1.000
2.Worthing Bears	2	2	1	1	0.500
3.Hemel Royals	0	2	0	2	0.000

=== Semi-finals ===
Derby Bucks vs. Guildford Kings

Derby Bucks	92–124	Guildford Kings

Guildford Kings	85–84	Derby Bucks
Guildford win on aggregate, 209–176

Leicester City Riders vs. Thames Valley Tigers

Leicester City Riders	112–106	Thames Valley Tigers

Thames Valley Tigers	114–98	Leicester City Riders
Thames Valley win on aggregate, 177–172

=== Final ===
17 January 1993

Thames Valley Tigers	91–84	Guildford Kings
Pts: Lester James (MVP) 24, Nigel Lloyd 17, Kevin St Kitts, Mike Obaseki, Michael Hayles		Pts: Trevor Gordon 24 Alton Byrd 20, Martin Henlan, Carl Miller

National Indoor Arena, Birmingham
Attendance: ?
Thames Valley Coach Mick Bett
Guildford Coach Kevin Cadle

== Seasonal awards ==
- Most Valuable Player: Colin Irish (Worthing Bears)
- Coach of the Year: Mick Bett (Thames Valley Tigers)
- All-Star Team:
  - Trevor Gordon (Guildford Kings)
  - Colin Irish (Worthing Bears)
  - Cleave Lewis (Worthing Bears)
  - Nigel Lloyd (Thames Valley Tigers)
  - Joel Moore (London Towers)
  - Derek Rucker (Birmingham Bullets)
  - Peter Scantlebury (London Towers)
  - Billy Singleton (Birmingham Bullets)
  - Tyrone Thomas (Cheshire Jets)
  - Gene Waldron (Leicester City Riders)

Preceded by 1991–92 season	BBL seasons 1992–93	Succeeded by 1993–94 season
