= 1990–91 British Basketball League season =

1990–91 BBL season
- League: British Basketball League
- Sport: Basketball
- Number of teams: 9

Roll of Honour
- BBL champions: Kingston
- Play Off's champions: Kingston
- National Cup champions: Sunderland
- BBL Trophy champions: Kingston

British Basketball League seasons
- ← 1989-90 1991-92 →

The 1990–91 BBL season was the 4th season of the British Basketball League (known as the Carlsberg League for sponsorship reasons) since its establishment in 1987. The season featured a total of nine teams, playing 24 games each. Following a new £1.3 million sponsorship deal with Carlsberg, the sport was unified once more as three divisions of the Carlsberg League were created.
Solent Stars dropped out of the top tier and would play their basketball in Division Four. Hemel Hempstead Royals and Worthing Bears returned to top tier action and the Bracknell Tigers became the Thames Valley Tigers.

Kingston claimed the Division One title and Play-off crown, as well as the League Trophy, earning their coach Kevin Cadle and star player Alton Byrd the award's for Coach and Player of the Year respectively. Sunderland claimed the National Cup preventing another Kingston clean sweep.

== Carlsberg League Division One (Tier 1) ==
=== Final standings ===
| Pos | Team | Pld | W | L | % | Pts |
|---|---|---|---|---|---|---|
| 1 | Kingston | 24 | 23 | 1 | 0.958 | 46 |
| 2 | Sunderland Saints | 24 | 18 | 6 | 0.750 | 36 |
| 3 | Thames Valley Tigers | 24 | 14 | 10 | 0.583 | 28 |
| 4 | Leicester City Riders | 24 | 14 | 10 | 0.583 | 28 |
| 5 | Derby Rams | 24 | 12 | 12 | 0.500 | 24 |
| 6 | Manchester Giants | 24 | 12 | 12 | 0.500 | 24 |
| 7 | Worthing Bears | 24 | 10 | 14 | 0.417 | 20 |
| 8 | Hemel Royals | 24 | 4 | 20 | 0.167 | 8 |
| 9 | London Docklands | 24 | 1 | 23 | 0.042 | 2 |

| = League winners |
| = Qualified for the play-offs |

=== Playoffs ===
==== Quarter-finals ====
(1) Kingston vs. (8) Hemel Royals

| Hemel Royals | 78–112 | Kingston |

| Kingston | 111–87 | Hemel Royals |
Kingston win series, 2–0

(2) Sunderland Saints vs. (7) Worthing Bears

| Worthing Bears | 104–107 | Sunderland Saints |

| Sunderland Saints | 123–119 (OT) | Worthing Bears |
Sunderland win series, 2–0

(3) Thames Valley Tigers vs. (6) Manchester Giants

| Manchester Giants | 83–82 | Thames Valley Tigers |

| Thames Valley Tigers | 76–75 | Manchester Giants |

| Thames Valley Tigers | 84–82 | Manchester Giants |
Thames Valley win series, 2–1

(4) Leicester City Riders vs. (5) Derby Rams

| Derby Rams | 92–109 | Leicester City Riders |

| Leicester City Riders | 79–75 | Derby Rams |
Leicester win series, 2–0

==== Semi-finals ====
| Kingston | 85–62 | Leicester City Riders |

National Exhibition Centre, Birmingham

| Sunderland Saints | 99–89 | Thames Valley Tigers |

National Exhibition Centre, Birmingham

==== Final ====
BBC 1

13 April 1991

| Kingston | 94–72 | Sunderland Saints |
| Pts: Alton Byrd (MVP) 22, Alan Cunningham 22, Martin Clark 17 | | Pts: Russ Saunders 19, Scott Paterson 18, Steve Bucknall 15 |

National Exhibition Centre, Birmingham
Attendance: ?
Kingston coach Kevin Cadle
Sunderand coach Dave Elderkin

== National League Division 2 (Tier 2) ==
=== Final standings ===
| Pos | Team | Pld | W | L | % | Pts |
|---|---|---|---|---|---|---|
| 1 | Cheshire Jets | 22 | 17 | 5 | 0.773 | 34 |
| 2 | Bury Lobos | 22 | 16 | 6 | 0.727 | 32 |
| 3 | Broxbourne | 22 | 16 | 6 | 0.727 | 32 |
| 4 | Watford Rebels | 22 | 14 | 8 | 0.636 | 28 |
| 5 | Oldham Celtics | 22 | 13 | 9 | 0.591 | 26 |
| 6 | Doncaster Eagles | 22 | 11 | 11 | 0.500 | 22 |
| 7 | Middlesbrough | 22 | 11 | 11 | 0.500 | 22 |
| 8 | Birmingham Bullets | 22 | 10 | 12 | 0.455 | 20 |
| 9 | Brixton TopCats | 22 | 10 | 12 | 0.455 | 20 |
| 10 | Coventry Flyers | 22 | 6 | 16 | 0.273 | 12 |
| 11 | Manchester Giants B | 22 | 4 | 18 | 0.182 | 8 |
| 12 | Plymouth Raiders | 22 | 4 | 18 | 0.182 | 8 |

| = League winners |

== National League Division 3 (Tier 3) ==
=== Final standings ===
| Pos | Team | Pld | W | L | % | Pts |
|---|---|---|---|---|---|---|
| 1 | Greenwich | 22 | 21 | 1 | 0.955 | 42 |
| 2 | Barnsley Generals | 22 | 17 | 5 | 0.772 | 34 |
| 3 | Cardiff Buccaneers | 22 | 16 | 6 | 0.727 | 32 |
| 4 | Chiltern Fastbreak | 22 | 14 | 8 | 0.636 | 28 |
| 5 | Cheshire Bulls | 22 | 11 | 11 | 0.500 | 22 |
| 6 | Kirklees Leos | 22 | 10 | 12 | 0.455 | 20 |
| 7 | Leicester Falcons | 22 | 10 | 12 | 0.455 | 20 |
| 8 | North London College | 22 | 10 | 12 | 0.455 | 20 |
| 9 | Swindon Rakers | 22 | 8 | 14 | 0.364 | 16 |
| 10 | Calderdale Explorers | 22 | 7 | 15 | 0.318 | 14 |
| 11 | Birmingham Bullets B | 22 | 6 | 16 | 0.273 | 12 |
| 12 | Fylde Coasters | 22 | 2 | 20 | 0.091 | 4 |

| = League winners |

== Coca-Cola National Cup ==
=== Second round ===
| Cheshire Jets | 82–50 | Calderdale Explorers |

| Birmingham Bullets | 66–80 | Cadbury Boost Kingston |

| Doncaster Eagles | 84–68 | Brixton Topcats |

| Telford | 90–109 | Sunderland Saints |

| Leicester City Riders | 89–72 | Solent Stars |

| Stentofon Worthing Bears | 80–77 | Kodak Hemel Royals |

| Watford Rebels | 89–124 | Thames Valley Tigers |

| Manchester Giants | 107–73 | London Docklands |

=== Quarter-finals ===
| Cheshire Jets | 85–103 | Leicester City Riders |

| Doncaster Eagles | 65–111 | Cadbury Boost Kingston |

| Sunderland Saints | 84–82 | Manchester Giants |

| Stentofon Worthing Bears | 94–104 | Thames Valley Tigers |

=== Semi-finals ===
2 March 1991

| Leicester City Riders | 94–91 (ot) | Thames Valley Tigers |

London Arena

2 March 1991

| Sunderland Saints | 88–81 | Cadbury Boost Kingston |

London Arena

=== Final ===
3 March 1991

| Sunderland Saints | 88–81 | Leicester City Riders |
| Pts: Russ Saunders 23, Scott Paterson 21, Clyde Vaughan 15, Peter Scantlebury 15, Steve Bucknall (MVP) 12 | | Pts: Gene Waldron 26, Dan Meagher 16, Dip Donaldson 15, Karl Brown 12 |

London Arena
Attendance: ?
Sunderland Coach Dave Elderkin
Leicester Coach ?

== NatWest Trophy ==
=== Group stage ===
North Group

| Team | Pts | Pld | W | L | Percent |
|---|---|---|---|---|---|
| 1.Manchester Giants | 8 | 4 | 4 | 0 | 1.000 |
| 2.Leicester City Riders | 4 | 4 | 2 | 2 | 0.500 |
| 3.Sunderland Saints | 4 | 4 | 2 | 2 | 0.500 |
| 4.Derby Rams | 4 | 4 | 2 | 2 | 0.500 |
| 5.Hemel Royals | 0 | 4 | 0 | 4 | 0.000 |

South Group

| Team | Pts | Pld | W | L | Percent |
|---|---|---|---|---|---|
| 1.Kingston | 12 | 6 | 6 | 0 | 1.000 |
| 2.Thames Valley Tigers | 8 | 6 | 4 | 2 | 0.667 |
| 3.Worthing Bears | 2 | 6 | 1 | 5 | 0.166 |
| 4.London Docklands | 2 | 6 | 1 | 5 | 0.166 |

=== Semi-finals ===
Manchester Giants vs. Leicester City Riders

| Leicester City Riders | 91–91 | Manchester Giants |

| Manchester Giants | 89–82 | Leicester City Riders |
Manchester win on aggregate, 180–173

Kingston vs. Thames Valley Tigers

| Thames Valley Tigers | 81–86 | Kingston |

| Kingston | 111–98 | Thames Valley Tigers |
Kingston win on aggregate, 197–179

=== Final ===
2 December 1990

| Kingston | 69–59 | Manchester Giants |
| Pts: Alan Cunningham (MVP) 24, Alton Byrd 12, Trevor Gordon 12, Martin Clark 10, Martin Henlan | | Pts: Kevin Penny 15, Kris Kearney 12, Mike Obaseki |

Royal Albert Hall, London
Attendance: ?
Kingston coach Kevin Cadle
Manchester coach Jeff Jones

== Seasonal awards ==
- Most Valuable Player: Alton Byrd (Kingston)
- Coach of the Year: Kevin Cadle (Kingston)
- All-Star Team:
  - Steve Bucknall (Sunderland Saints)
  - Alton Byrd (Kingston)
  - Martin Clark (Kingston)
  - Alan Cunningham (Kingston)
  - Kris Kearney (Manchester Giants)
  - Ernest Lee (Derby Rams)
  - Dan Meagher (Leicester City Riders)
  - Dale Roberts (Thames Valley Tigers)
  - Russ Saunders (Sunderland Saints)
  - Clyde Vaughan (Sunderland Saints)

| Preceded by 1989–90 season | BBL seasons 1990–91 | Succeeded by 1991–92 season |
