= 1988–89 British Basketball League season =

1988–89 BBL season
- League: British Basketball League
- Sport: Basketball
- Number of teams: 11

Roll of Honour
- BBL champions: Glasgow Rangers
- Play-off's champions: Glasgow Rangers
- National Cup champions: Bracknell Tigers
- BBL Trophy champions: Bracknell Tigers

British Basketball League seasons
- ← 1987–88 1989–90 →

The 1988–89 BBL season was the second season of the British Basketball League (known as the Carlsberg League for sponsorship reasons) since its establishment in 1987. The season featured a total of 11 teams, playing 20 games each. The league had suffered in the 1989 close season because Portsmouth was wound up followed by Calderdale Explorers and Birmingham Bullets both dropping out of the league. Bolton and Bury Giants became the Olympic City Giants and Kingston moved north of the border playing as Glasgow Rangers. The new season was supposed to feature 12 teams, however Oldham Celtics dropped out of the league and into the National League (Tier 2) after just one game, due to financial difficulties.

The season was dominated by the success of the league's two Scottish teams Glasgow Rangers and Livingston, who finished the regular season in first and second place respectively. Glasgow's Kevin Cadle and Alan Cunningham were also named as the league's Coach and Player of the year, however the Scottish dominance was broken by Bracknell Tigers who were victorious in the League Trophy against Livingston in the Final.

Below the Carlsberg League in the National League Division 1, it came as no surprise that Oldham Celtics sealed the title bearing in mind that they had originally planned to play in the top tier.

== Carlsberg League (Tier 1) ==
=== Final standings ===
Pos	Team	Pld	W	L	%	Pts
1	Glasgow Rangers	20	18	2	0.900	36
2	Livingston	20	16	4	0.800	32
3	Bracknell Tigers	20	15	5	0.750	30
4	Leicester City Riders	20	14	6	0.700	28
5	Manchester Eagles	20	13	7	0.650	26
6	Sunderland 76ers	20	12	8	0.600	24
7	Hemel Royals	20	9	11	0.450	18
8	Olympic City Giants	20	4	16	0.200	8
9	Solent Stars	20	4	16	0.200	8
10	Derby Rams	20	3	17	0.150	6
11	Crystal Palace	20	2	18	0.100	4

= League winners
= Qualified for the play-offs

=== Playoffs ===
==== Quarter-finals ====
(1) Glasgow Rangers vs. (8) Olympic City Giants

Olympic City Giants	96–117	Glasgow Rangers

Glasgow Rangers	125–95	Olympic City Giants
Glasgow win series, 2–0

(2) Livingston vs. (7) Hemel Royals

Hemel Royals	78–92	Livingston

Livingston	108–105	Hemel Royals
Livingston win series, 2–0

(3) Sunderland 76ers vs. (6) Bracknell Tigers

Sunderland 76ers	86–96	Bracknell Tigers

Bracknell Tigers	110–96	Sunderland 76ers
Bracknell win series, 2–0

(4) Leicester City Riders vs. (5) Manchester Eagles

Manchester Eagles	83–89	Leicester City Riders

Leicester City Riders	80–74	Manchester Eagles
Leicester win series, 2–0

==== Semi-finals ====
15 April 1989

Glasgow Rangers	87–67	Leicester City Riders

National Exhibition Centre, Birmingham

15 April 1989

Livingston	72–63	Bracknell Tigers

National Exhibition Centre, Birmingham

==== Third place ====
16 April 1989

Bracknell Tigers	106–89	Leicester City Riders

National Exhibition Centre, Birmingham

==== Final ====
16 April 1989

Report

Glasgow Rangers	89–86	MIM Livingston
Pts: Butch Hayes 27, Joel Moore 22, Alan Cunningham 19, Jim Morrisson 13, Tony McDaid, Danny Davis, Alan Riddle, John Duncan, Terry Mangham, Martin Clark		Pts: Vic Fleming 30, Ralton Way 19, Iain McLean 15, Tommy Collier 10, Lewis Young, Graeme Hill, Steve Hoffman, Alan Ryan, Derek Frame, Jason Fogarty

National Exhibition Centre, Birmingham
Attendance: ?
Glasgow coach – Kevin Cadle
Livingston coach – Ian Gordon

== National League Division 1 (Tier 2) ==
=== Final standings ===
Pos	Team	Pld	W	L	%	Pts
1	Oldham Celtics	20	17	3	0.850	34
2	Brixton Topcats	20	17	3	0.850	34
3	Birmingham Bullets	20	16	4	0.800	32
4	Worthing Bears	20	15	5	0.750	30
5	Gateshead Vikings	20	14	6	0.700	28
6	Plymouth Raiders	20	10	10	0.500	20
7	Oxford Park	20	8	12	0.400	16
8	Cheshire Jets	20	6	14	0.300	12
9	Corby Flyers	20	4	16	0.200	8
10	Stockport Giants	20	3	17	0.150	6
11	Tower Hamlets	20	0	20	0.000	0

= League winners

== Coca-Cola National Cup ==
=== Second Round ===
Cheshire Jets	67–91	Birmingham Bullets

Plymouth Raiders	73–117	Bracknell Tigers

Derby Rams	106–66	Walsall

Oxford Park	vs.	w/o

Olympic City Giants	vs.	Leicester City Riders

Crystal Palace	98–69	Stevenage

Hemel Hempstead Watford Royals	113–100	Worthing Bears

Oldham Celtics	89–100	Manchester Eagles

=== Quarter-finals ===
Birmingham Bullets	77–80	Olympic City Giants

Bracknell Tigers	103–75	Crystal Palace

Derby Rams	37–43 +	Hemel Hempstead Watford Royals

Manchester Eagles	123–59	Oxford Park

+ Derby expelled after match was abandoned following a scuffle

=== Semi-finals ===
17 March 1989

Bracknell Tigers	80–75	Olympic City Giants

London Arena

17 March 1989

Hemel Hempstead Watford Royals	77–79	Manchester Eagles

London Arena

=== Final ===
18 March 1989

Bracknell Tigers	87–75	Manchester Eagles
Pts: Brian Kellybrew (MVP) 24, Peter Scantlebury 11, Mike Hayles 10, Paul James 10, Dale Roberts		Pts: Dave Gardner 21, Colin Irish 12, Lang 10

London Arena
Attendance:
Bracknell HC Jim Guymon
Manchester HC Jeff Jones

== NatWest Trophy ==
=== Group stage ===
North Group

Team	Pts	Pld	W	L	Percent
1. Glasgow Rangers	20	10	10	0	1.000
2. Livingston	16	10	8	2	0.800
3. Manchester Eagles	10	10	5	5	0.500
4. Olympic City Giants	10	10	5	5	0.500
5. Sunderland 76ers	4	10	2	8	0.200
6. Oldham Celtics	0	10	0	10	0.000

South Group

Team	Pts	Pld	W	L	Percent
1. Bracknell Tigers	18	10	9	1	0.900
2. Leicester City Riders	14	10	7	3	0.700
3. Solent Stars	12	10	6	4	0.600
4. Derby Rams	6	10	3	7	0.300
5. Hemel Royals	6	10	3	7	0.300
6. Crystal Palace	4	10	2	8	0.200

Despite dropping out of the Carlsberg League and into the National League after just one game of the season, Oldham Celtics continued their schedule in the League Trophy.

=== Quarter-finals ===
Glasgow Rangers vs. Olympic City Giants

Olympic City Giants	84–111	Glasgow Rangers

Glasgow Rangers	107–70	Olympic City Giants
Glasgow win on aggregate, 218–154

Livingston vs. Manchester Eagles

Livingston	77–58	Manchester Eagles

Manchester Eagles	74–72	Livingston
Livingston win on aggregate, 149–132

Bracknell Tigers vs. Derby Rams

Derby Rams	68–107	Bracknell Tigers

Bracknell Tigers	114–73	Derby Rams
Bracknell win on aggregate, 221–141

Leicester City Riders vs. Solent Stars

Solent Stars	79–86	Leicester City Riders

Leicester City Riders	108–83	Solent Stars
Leicester win on aggregate, 194–162

=== Semi-finals ===
Glasgow Rangers vs. Livingston

Livingston	92–88	Glasgow Rangers

Glasgow Rangers	63–62	Livingston
Livingston win on aggregate, 154–151

Bracknell Tigers vs. Leicester City Riders

Bracknell Tigers	90–82	Leicester City Riders

Leicester City Riders	67–77	Bracknell Tigers
Bracknell win on aggregate, 167–149

=== Final ===
25 February 1989

Bracknell Tigers	89–81	Livingston
Pts: Trevor Gordon 20, Dale Roberts 15, Peter Scantlebury 11, Brian Kellybrew 11		Pts: Tommy Collier 18, Iain McLean 16, Vic Fleming 16, Ralton Way 13

Aston Villa Leisure Centre, Birmingham
Attendance: ?
Bracknell coach – Brian Kellybrew
Livingston coach – Ian Gordon

== Seasonal awards ==
- Most Valuable Player: Alan Cunningham (Glasgow Rangers)
- Coach of the Year: Kevin Cadle (Glasgow Rangers)
- All-Star Team:
  - Tony Balogun (Leicester City Riders)
  - Jimmy Brandon (Leicester City Riders)
  - Tommy Collier (Livingston)
  - Alan Cunningham (Glasgow Rangers)
  - Dan Davis (Glasgow Rangers)
  - Lorenzo Duncan (Hemel Royals)
  - Butch Hays (Glasgow Rangers)
  - Russ Saunders (Sunderland 76ers)
  - Phil Smith (Solent Stars)
  - Clyde Vaughan (Sunderland 76ers)

Preceded by 1987–88 season	BBL seasons 1988–89	Succeeded by 1989–90 season
