= 1989–90 British Basketball League season =

1989–90 BBL season
- League: British Basketball League
- Sport: Basketball
- Teams: 8

Roll of Honour
- BBL champions: Kingston
- Playoffs champions: Kingston
- National Cup champions: Kingston
- BBL Trophy champions: Kingston

British Basketball League seasons
- 1988–89 1990–91

The 1989–90 BBL season was the third season of the British Basketball League (known as the Carlsberg League for Carlsberg Group sponsorship reasons) since its establishment in 1987. The season featured a total of just eight teams, playing 28 games each. Due to the low number of teams, the post-season play-offs featured only the top four teams from the regular season instead of the usual top eight finishers. The future of the league was in the balance due to the waning number of teams. Livingston folded, Crystal Palace and Hemel Hempstead Watford Royals both dropped to the National League and Glasgow Rangers moved back to Kingston. There was small consolation in the formation of a new club called London Docklands (formerly Tower Hamlets) which joined the league.

Kingston completed a clean sweep of all four trophies claiming the title and play-off crown, as well as the National Cup and NatWest League Trophy.
Oldham Celtics secured the second tier league title for a second consecutive year.

== Carlsberg League (Tier 1) ==
=== Final standings ===
Pos	Team	Pld	W	L	%	Pts
1	Kingston	28	25	3	0.892	50
2	Manchester Giants	28	21	7	0.750	42
3	Sunderland 76ers	28	20	8	0.714	40
4	Bracknell Tigers	28	20	8	0.714	40
5	Derby Rams	28	10	18	0.357	20
6	Leicester City Riders	28	7	21	0.250	14
7	Solent Stars	28	7	21	0.250	14
8	London Docklands	28	2	26	0.071	4

= League winners
= Qualified for the play-offs

=== Playoffs ===
==== Semi-finals ====
13 April 1990

Kingston	83–72	Bracknell Tigers

National Exhibition Centre, Birmingham

13 April 1990

Manchester Giants	106–111 (OT)	Sunderland 76ers

National Exhibition Centre, Birmingham

==== Third place ====
14 April 1990

Manchester Giants	110–103	Bracknell Tigers

National Exhibition Centre, Birmingham

==== Final ====
14 April 1990

Kingston	87–82	Sunderland Saints
Pts: Alan Cunningham (MVP) 20, Martin Clark 15, Micah Blunt 12, Richard Scantlebury 10, Mike Griffiths 8, Paul Stimpson		Pts: Russ Saunders 23, Clyde Vaughan 21, Scott Wilke, Ken Nottage, Steve Nelson

National Exhibition Centre, Birmingham
Attendance: ?
Kingston coach Kevin Cadle
Sunderland coach Craig Lynch

== National League Division 1 (Tier 2) ==
=== Final standings ===
Pos	Team	Pld	W	L	%	Pts
1	Oldham Celtics	22	20	2	0.909	40
2	Worthing Bears	22	19	3	0.864	38
3	Brixton TopCats	22	19	3	0.864	38
4	Hemel Hempstead Royals	22	14	8	0.636	28
5	Bury Lobos	22	11	11	0.500	22
6	Cheshire Jets	22	10	12	0.455	20
7	Crystal Palace	22	9	13	0.409	18
8	Birmingham Bullets	22	8	14	0.364	16
9	Plymouth Raiders	22	8	14	0.364	16
10	Stevenage Falcons	22	5	17	0.227	10
11	Gateshead Vikings	22	5	17	0.227	10
12	Corby Flyers	22	4	18	0.182	8

= League winners

== National League Division 2 (Tier 3) ==
=== Final standings ===
Pos	Team	Pld	W	L	%	Pts
1	Doncaster Eagles	20	18	2	0.900	36
2	Middlesbrough	20	16	4	0.800	32
3	Stockport Giants	20	16	4	0.800	32
4	Watford Rebels	20	14	6	0.700	28
5	Cardiff Bay Buccaneers	20	9	11	0.450	18
6	Greenwich	20	9	11	0.450	18
7	Manchester Blue Jays	20	8	12	0.400	16
8	North London College	20	6	14	0.300	12
9	Birmingham Bullets B	20	6	14	0.300	12
10	Kirklees	20	5	15	0.250	10
11	Calderdale Explorers	20	3	17	0.150	6

= League winners

== Coca-Cola National Cup ==
=== Quarter-finals ===
Kingston	102–89	Manchester Giants

Bury Lobos	88–98	Bracknell Tigers

Derby Rams	98–82	Solent Stars

Sunderland 76ers	137–94	Stockport

=== Semi-finals ===
24 March 1990

Kingston	87–68	Bracknell Tigers

London Arena

24 March 1990

Derby Rams	79–83	Sunderland 76ers

London Arena

=== Final ===
25 March 1990

Kingston	103–78	Sunderland 76ers
Pts: Alan Cunningham 18, Richard Scantlebury 18, Micah Blunt 16, Mike Griffiths 13, Martin Clark 12, Alton Byrd 12, Matthew Cunningham, Steve Tomaschek

London Arena
Attendance: 5,800
Kingston Coach Kevin Cadle
Sunderland Coach Craig Lynch

== NatWest Trophy ==
=== Group stage ===
North Group

Team	Pts	Pld	W	L	Percent
1. Manchester Giants	12	6	6	0	1.000
2. Sunderland 76ers	8	6	4	2	0.667
3. Leicester City Riders	4	6	2	4	0.333
4. Derby Rams	0	6	0	6	0.000

South Group

Team	Pts	Pld	W	L	Percent
1. Kingston	10	6	5	1	0.833
2. Bracknell Tigers	8	6	5	1	0.833
3. Solent Stars	2	6	1	5	0.166
4. London Docklands	2	6	1	5	0.166

=== Semi-finals ===
Manchester Giants vs. Sunderland 76ers

Manchester Giants	98–95	Sunderland 76ers

Sunderland 76ers	87–88	Manchester Giants
Manchester win on aggregate, 186–182

Kingston vs. Bracknell Tigers

Bracknell Tigers	88–107	Kingston

Kingston	129–99	Bracknell Tigers
Kingston win on aggregate, 236–187

=== Final ===
4 December 1989

Kingston	86–77	Manchester Giants
Pts: Joel Moore 25, Martin Clark 16, Alan Cunningham 12, Micah Blunt 11, Richard Scantlebury 10, Alton Byrd 10, Mike Griffiths 2		Pts: Jerry Johnson 22, Dave Gardner 19, Kris Kearney 11, Kevin St Kitts 10, Kevin Penny 7, Jason Fogerty 6, Keith Ramsey 2

Royal Albert Hall, London
Attendance: ?
Kingston coach Kevin Cadle
Manchester coach Jeff Jones

== Seasonal awards ==
- Most Valuable Player: Clyde Vaughan (Sunderland 76ers)
- Coach of the Year: Kevin Cadle (Kingston)
- All-Star Team:
  - Alton Byrd (Kingston)
  - Kris Kearney (Manchester Giants)
  - Dale Roberts (Bracknell Tigers)
  - Russ Saunders (Sunderland 76ers)
  - Peter Scantlebury (Bracknell Tigers)
  - Kenny Scott (Derby Rams)
  - Tom Seaman (Bracknell Tigers)
  - Mike Spaid (Solent Stars)
  - Clyde Vaughan (Sunderland 76ers)
  - Scott Wilke (Sunderland 76ers)

Preceded by 1988–89 season	BBL seasons 1989–90	Succeeded by 1990–91 season
