= Nick Nurse =

American basketball coach (born 1967)

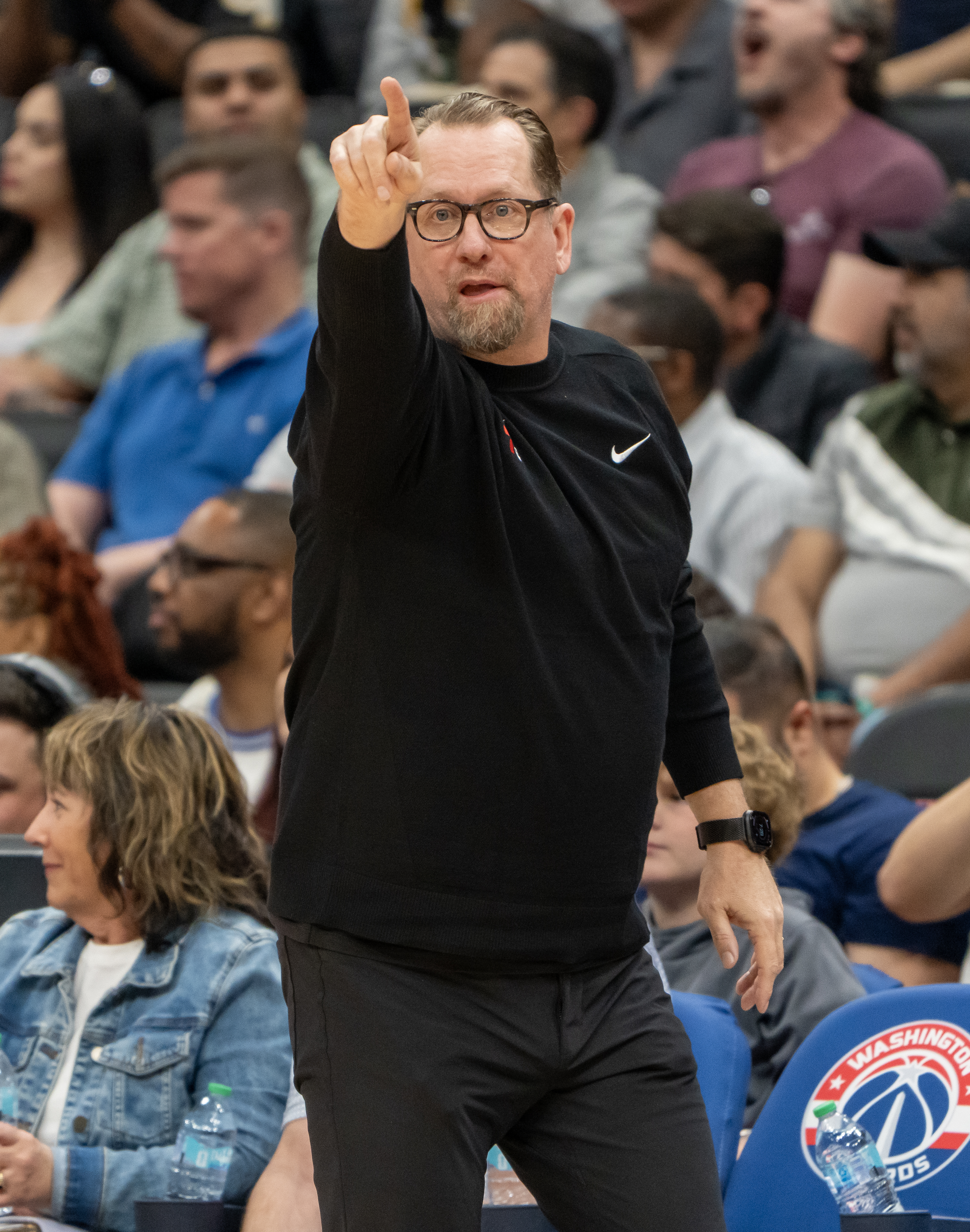
- Nurse with the Philadelphia 76ers in 2026

Philadelphia 76ers
- Title: Head coach
- League: NBA

Personal information
- Born: July 24, 1967 (age 59) Carroll, Iowa, U.S.
- Listed height: 6 ft 1 in (1.85 m)

Career information
- High school: Kuemper Catholic (Carroll, Iowa)
- College: Northern Iowa (1985–1989)
- Playing career: 1990–1991
- Position: Point guard
- Number: 4
- Coaching career: 1989–present

Career history

Playing
- 1990–1991: Derby Rams

Coaching
- 1989–1990: Northern Iowa (assistant)
- 1990–1991: Derby Rams (player-coach)
- 1991–1993: Grand View
- 1993–1995: South Dakota (assistant)
- 1995–1997: Birmingham Bullets
- 1998: Telindus Oostende
- 1998–2000: Manchester Giants
- 2000–2001: London Towers
- 2001: Oklahoma Storm (assistant)
- 2001–2006: Brighton Bears
- 2005: Oklahoma Storm (assistant)
- 2007–2011: Iowa Energy
- 2011–2013: Rio Grande Valley Vipers
- 2013–2018: Toronto Raptors (assistant)
- 2018–2023: Toronto Raptors
- 2023–present: Philadelphia 76ers

Career highlights
- As head coach: NBA champion (2019); NBA Coach of the Year (2020); NBA All-Star Game head coach (2020); 2× NBA D-League champion (2011, 2013); NBA D-League Coach of the Year (2011); 2× BBL champion (1996, 2000); 2× BBL Coach of the Year (2000, 2004); 4× BBL All-Star Game head coach (1995, 1997, 1999, 2001); English Cup winner (2003); Uni-Ball Trophy winner (1999); Belgian Cup winner (1998); Belgian Supercup winner (1998)

Nicholas David Nurse (born July 24, 1967) is an American professional basketball coach and former player who is the head coach for the Philadelphia 76ers of the National Basketball Association (NBA). He previously served as head coach for the Toronto Raptors, whom he led to an NBA championship in 2019 and with whom he was named the NBA Coach of the Year in 2020.

Nurse played college basketball for the Northern Iowa Panthers. He played professional basketball with the Derby Rams in the British Basketball League.

== Early life ==
Nicholas David Nurse was born on July 24, 1967, in Carroll, Iowa. Nurse attended the Kuemper Catholic School System, where he excelled in basketball.

== College career ==
Nurse played at the University of Northern Iowa from 1985 to 1989, appearing in 111 games. He is the school's all-time three-point percentage leader at .468 (170 of 363). At Northern Iowa, Nurse was a teammate of future Division I college coach Greg McDermott. He was the team's sole student assistant coach during their successful 1989–90 season.

Nurse graduated from Northern Iowa in May 1990 with a B.A. in accounting.

== Professional career ==
=== Derby Rams (1990–1991) ===
Nurse became a player-coach for the Derby Rams in the British Basketball League during the 1990–91 season; following the season, Nurse never played professionally again, opting to pursue a full-time coaching career.

== Coaching career ==
=== Northern Iowa (1989–1990) ===
During their successful 1989–90 season, Nurse was the sole student assistant coach for Northern Iowa in his final year with the team.

=== Grand View (1991–1993) ===
In 1991, Nurse got his first full-time head coaching job at Grand View University at age 23. At the time, he was the youngest college basketball head coach in the country. Nurse coached at Grand View for two seasons.

=== South Dakota (1993–1995) ===
Nurse was an assistant coaching role at the University of South Dakota for two seasons.

=== Europe (1995–2007) ===
Nurse later spent 11 seasons coaching in Europe, mostly in the British Basketball League (BBL). During that time, he won two BBL championships as a head coach, one with the Birmingham Bullets in 1996 and one with the Manchester Giants in 2000, while also helping London Towers in the Euroleague. Nurse also won the BBL Coach of the Year Award in the 1999–2000 and 2003–04 seasons. He also coached for the Telindus Oostende of the Ethias League in 1998, as well as became an assistant coach for the Oklahoma Storm of the United States Basketball League in both 2001 and 2005.

=== D-League ===
In 2007, Nurse accepted the head coaching job for the Iowa Energy, who were preparing for their first season in the NBA D-League (now called the NBA G League). The Energy won division titles under Nurse in the 2008–09 and 2009–10 seasons.

=== Iowa State University ===
After three seasons with the Energy, Nurse agreed to join the coaching staff of the Iowa State Cyclones as an associate head coach in April 2010. Four days after Nurse's hiring was announced on April 22, head coach Greg McDermott left to become the head coach at Creighton. Nurse was not offered a spot on the new staff at Iowa State, but received $175,000 in a settlement for his four days as an assistant.

=== Return to the D-League ===
Nurse immediately returned to his former position as head coach with the Energy. In the 2010–11 NBA D-League season, Nurse received the Dennis Johnson Coach of the Year Award after helping Iowa achieve the best record in the league (37–13). Nurse and the Energy then went on to win the 2011 D-League championship. Nurse joined Joey Meyer as the only NBA G League coaches to win multiple championships.

Before the 2011–12 season, Nurse left the Energy for the D-League's Rio Grande Valley Vipers. In the 2012–13 season, the Vipers finished with a record of 35–15 and won the D-League finals in a two-game sweep of the Santa Cruz Warriors. Nurse became the only D-league coach ever to win championships with multiple teams.

During his six seasons coaching in the D-League, Nurse had 23 players on his rosters called up to the NBA.

=== Toronto Raptors (2013–2023) ===
In July 2013, Nurse departed the Vipers for an assistant job on the coaching staff of the Toronto Raptors under Dwane Casey. He was in charge of the offense during his time under Casey, and in the 2017–18 season, Nurse was credited for changes to the Raptors' offensive game plan which included increases in passing and three-point attempts. The improved offense helped the Raptors win a franchise-record 59 games, but the team was swept in the second round of the 2018 NBA playoffs by the Cleveland Cavaliers, and Casey was fired shortly thereafter.

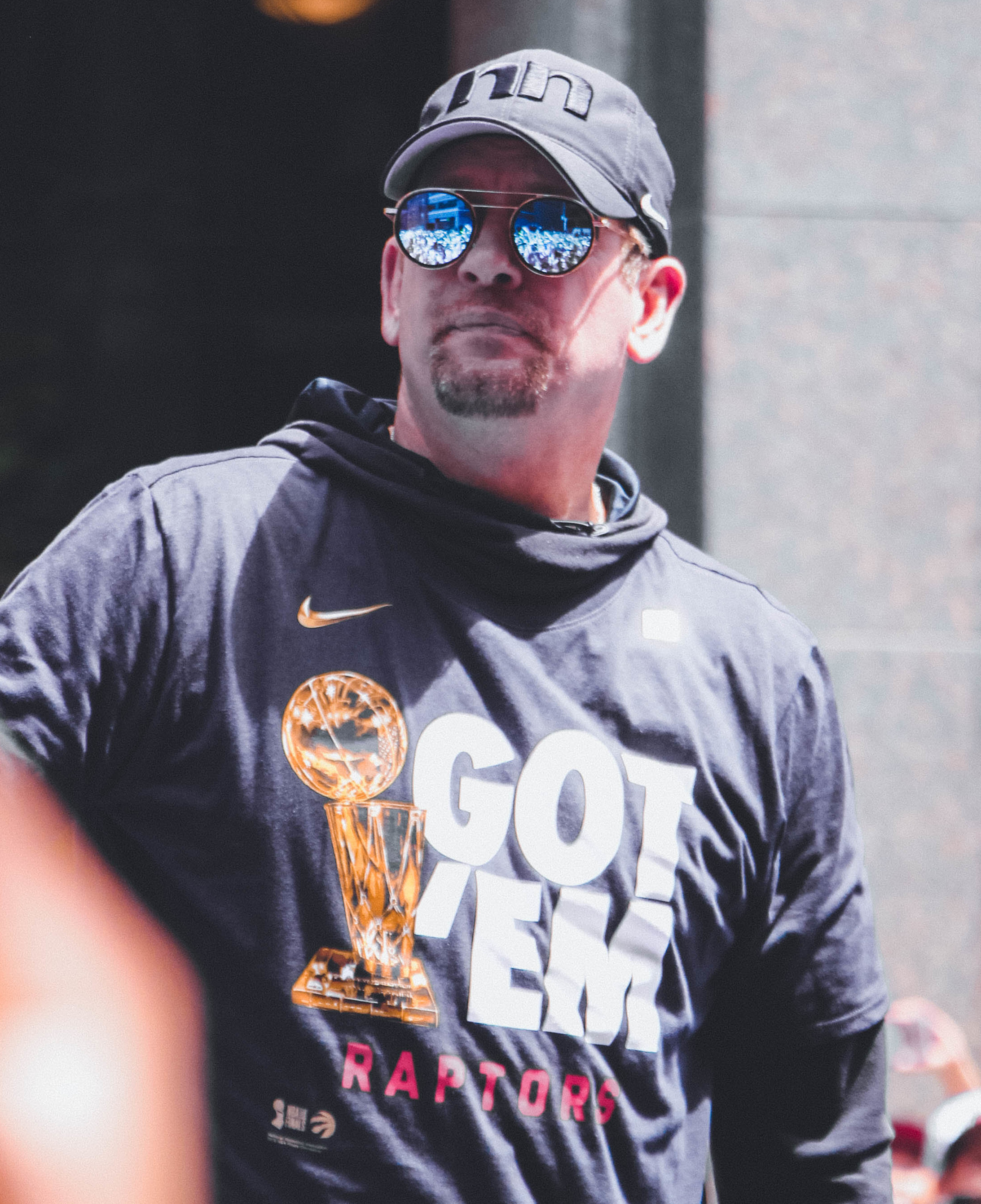
Nurse at the Raptors championship parade in 2019

On June 14, 2018, the Raptors promoted Nurse to the position of head coach to succeed Casey. In his first season, he guided the Raptors to a 58–24 record, led by offseason acquisition (and eventual Finals MVP) Kawhi Leonard and emerging star Pascal Siakam, who would go on to win the NBA's Most Improved Player award. On May 25, 2019, Nurse coached the Raptors to the 2019 NBA Finals, the first for the franchise, after taking the Eastern Conference Championship by defeating the Milwaukee Bucks in six games. On June 13, Nurse became the first head coach to win both the NBA and NBA D-League/G League titles, when the Raptors defeated the Golden State Warriors in Game 6 of the NBA Finals, winning the Raptors their first championship in franchise history.

In Nurse's second season, the Raptors finished with a 53–19 record, in a season shortened by the COVID-19 pandemic. He was widely praised for his creativity and innovation in ensuring that the Raptors were able to maintain a high level of play despite losing Leonard, finishing with a higher win percentage than they did the previous season. That season, Nurse qualified to be a head coach in the 2020 NBA All-Star Game as the Eastern Conference representative. On August 22, 2020, Nurse was named NBA Coach of the Year. However, the Raptors were unable to repeat their playoff success of the previous season, and were eliminated in the conference semifinals, losing in 7 games at the hands of the Boston Celtics.

On September 15, 2020, the Raptors announced that Nurse had signed a multi-year contract extension. After an unsuccessful 2020–21 season in which the Raptors played in Tampa Bay due to COVID-19, Nurse guided the team to 48 wins and a return to the playoffs in 2022.

On April 21, 2023, the Raptors announced that they had fired Nurse, after the team failed to make the playoffs due to their loss to the Chicago Bulls in the Play-in Tournament.

=== Philadelphia 76ers (2023–present) ===
On June 1, 2023, the Philadelphia 76ers announced that Nurse had been hired as their head coach. His experience game-planning defensively against their reigning MVP center Joel Embiid in the past was considered helpful perspective, namely to help strategize for Embiid to succeed in playoff situations.

During the 2023–24 season, Nurse and the 76ers topped the Raptors 114–107 in his return to Toronto as an opposing coach on October 28. Despite injuries to Embiid and other players throughout the season, Nurse was able to secure a 47–35 record and a play-in tournament victory for the Sixers against the No. 8 seed Heat. As the No. 7 seed, they were eliminated in six games by the New York Knicks in the first round of the playoffs.

The 2024–25 season ended in a 24–58 record, the 76ers' first time missing the playoffs since 2017.

The 2025–26 season saw Philadelphia drastically improve from their 24-win campaign a year prior, finishing 45–37 despite star center Joel Embiid missing 44 games during the regular season, as well as Paul George missing 45 games. The 76ers secured the seventh seed in the Eastern Conference by defeating the Orlando Magic 109–97 in the play-in game, setting up a First Round matchup with the Boston Celtics. Boston, who recently welcomed back Jayson Tatum after missing the first four months of the season following an Achilles rupture he had suffered in the previous year's playoffs, jumped out to a 3–1 series lead before the 76ers won three straight, coming back from a 3–1 deficit for the first time in their franchise's history and securing their first series win against their archrivals since 1982. This was also the first time in Boston Celtics history that they had lost a series after leading 3–1. After defeating the Celtics 109–100 in Game 7, Philadelphia would be eliminated in the Semi-Finals, losing in a 4–0 sweep to the eventual champion New York Knicks. This was also the first time in NBA history that a team came back from down 3-1 and then proceeded to get swept in the same postseason.

== National team career ==
Nurse was an assistant coach under Chris Finch, for the Great Britain national team from 2009 to 2012, including the 2012 Summer Olympics in London.

On June 24, 2019, Nurse was named the head coach of the Canadian men's national team for the 2019 FIBA World Cup and beyond. In an attempt to build continuity in the national team, Nurse secured the commitment of fourteen top Canadian players for three consecutive summers beginning in 2022. The cohort, which included NBA stars such as Shai Gilgeous-Alexander and Jamal Murray, was specifically assembled to play at the 2023 FIBA World Cup and the 2024 Paris Olympics.

On June 27, 2023, Nurse resigned from his role as national team head coach, just before the World Cup. Nurse cited his transition to his role as the 76ers' head coach as the primary reason for his departure. He was replaced by Jordi Fernández.

== Head coaching record ==
=== NBA ===
Legend
Regular season	G	Games coached	W	Games won	L	Games lost	W–L %	Win–loss %
Playoffs	PG	Playoff games	PW	Playoff wins	PL	Playoff losses	PW–L %	Playoff win–loss %

Team	Year	G	W	L	W–L%	Finish	PG	PW	PL	PW–L%	Result
Toronto	2018–19	82	58	24	.707	1st in Atlantic	24	16	8	.667	Won NBA championship
Toronto	2019–20	72	53	19	.736	1st in Atlantic	11	7	4	.636	Lost in conference semifinals
Toronto	2020–21	72	27	45	.375	5th in Atlantic	—	—	—	—	Missed playoffs
Toronto	2021–22	82	48	34	.585	3rd in Atlantic	6	2	4	.333	Lost in first round
Toronto	2022–23	82	41	41	.500	5th in Atlantic	—	—	—	—	Missed playoffs
Philadelphia	2023–24	82	47	35	.573	3rd in Atlantic	6	2	4	.333	Lost in first round
Philadelphia	2024–25	82	24	58	.293	5th in Atlantic	—	—	—	—	Missed playoffs
Philadelphia	2025–26	82	45	37	.549	4th in Atlantic	11	4	7	.364	Lost in conference semifinals
Career		636	343	293	.539		58	31	27	.534	

=== International ===
Statistics
Team	Year	G	W	L	W–L%	Tournament	TG	TW	TL	TW–L%	Result
Canada	2019	13	6	7	.462	World Cup	5	2	3	.400	21st place
Canada	2021	3	2	1	.667	Olympics	—	—	—	—	Did not qualify
Career		16	8	8	.500		5	2	3	.400	

== Personal life ==
In 2022, after completing his dissertation and comprehensive exam, Nurse graduated from Concordia University Chicago with a Ph.D. in Sports Leadership. On June 20, 2025, Nurse received an honorary Doctor of Laws degree from York University in Toronto, Ontario, Canada.

Nurse and his wife, Roberta, have three sons.

== Bibliography ==
- Rapture: Fifteen Teams, Four Countries, One NBA Championship, and How to Find a Way to Win — Damn Near Anywhere. Little, Brown and Company. 2020. ISBN 978-0316540179.

== Filmography ==
=== Television ===
Year	Title	Role	Notes
2022	Murdoch Mysteries	Locker room attendant	Episode: "It's a Wonderful Game"
2023	Pretty Hard Cases	Officer Nick	
