= Robin Jones (basketball) =

American basketball player

Personal information
- Born: February 2, 1954 St. Louis, Missouri, U.S.
- Died: July 16, 2018 (aged 64) Chicago, Illinois, U.S.
- Listed height: 6 ft 9 in (2.06 m)
- Listed weight: 225 lb (102 kg)

Career information
- High school: Beaumont (St. Louis, Missouri)
- College: Saint Louis (1972–1975)
- NBA draft: 1975: undrafted
- Position: Power forward
- Number: 34

Career history
- 1976–1977: Portland Trail Blazers
- 1977–1978: Houston Rockets
- 1978–1981: Olympique Antibes
- 1981–1982: Team Talbot, Guildford

Career highlights
- NBA champion (1977)
- Stats at NBA.com
- Stats at Basketball Reference

Robin Dale Jones (February 2, 1954 – July 16, 2018) was an American professional basketball player. He played college basketball for Saint Louis.

Jones was born in St. Louis, Missouri. He spent two seasons in the NBA, signing as a free agent with the Portland Trail Blazers in 1976. There he came off the bench, playing in 63 games, to help the team to their first ever league title in 1977. The following season, he moved to the Houston Rockets where he played only 12 games. Jones then spent 5 years playing in Europe before returning to the United States where he worked in marketing for Anheuser-Busch. In 1995, he suffered a stroke and retired from Anheuser-Busch the next year as Illinois director of marketing.

Jones died on July 16, 2018, in Chicago.

== Career statistics ==
Legend
GP	Games played	GS	Games started	MPG	Minutes per game
FG%	Field goal percentage	3P%	3-point field goal percentage	FT%	Free throw percentage
RPG	Rebounds per game	APG	Assists per game	SPG	Steals per game
BPG	Blocks per game	PPG	Points per game	**Bold**	Career high
†	Won an NBA championship

=== NBA ===
==== Regular season ====
Year	Team	GP	MPG	FG%	FT%	RPG	APG	SPG	BPG	PPG
1976–77†	Portland	**63**	**16.9**	.465	**.606**	**4.7**	**1.3**	**.6**	**.6**	**5.5**
1977–78	Houston	12	5.5	**.550**	.400	1.2	.2	.1	.1	2.2
Career		75	15.1	.470	.588	4.1	1.1	.5	.5	4.9

==== Playoffs ====
Year	Team	GP	MPG	FG%	FT%	RPG	APG	SPG	BPG	PPG
1977†	Portland	19	5.5	.469	.667	1.2	.5	.2	.2	1.9
