= 1994–95 British Basketball League season =

1994–95 BBL season
- League: British Basketball League
- Sport: Basketball

Roll of Honour
- BBL champions: Sheffield Sharks
- Play Off's champions: Worthing Bears
- National Cup champions: Sheffield Sharks
- BBL Trophy champions: Thames Valley Tigers

British Basketball League seasons
- 1993–94 1995–96

The 1994–95 BBL season was known as the Budweiser League for sponsorship reasons. The season featured a total of 13 teams, playing 36 games each. A major change saw the Guildford Kings franchise fold due to the club being unable to negotiate a viable contract with the owners of the Guildford Spectrum. The league sold Kings' licence to a group headed by Robert Earl, Ed Simons and Harvey Goldsmith, who established the Leopards. Oldham Celtics dropped down a division to National League Division One.

Newcomers Sheffield Sharks formerly Sheffield Forgers won the regular season and claimed the title in their rookie season in addition to becoming National Cup champions. Seventh-seed Worthing Bears caused a huge upset in the post-season Play-off to take the Championship crown with a memorable victory over Manchester Giants in the final. The Thames Valley Tigers secured the BBL Trophy.

== Budweiser League Championship (Tier 1) ==
=== Final standings ===
| Pos | Team | Pld | W | L | % | Pts |
|---|---|---|---|---|---|---|
| 1 | Sheffield Sharks | 36 | 29 | 7 | 0.805 | 58 |
| 2 | Thames Valley Tigers | 36 | 28 | 8 | 0.778 | 56 |
| 3 | London Towers | 36 | 28 | 8 | 0.778 | 56 |
| 4 | Manchester Giants | 36 | 26 | 10 | 0.722 | 52 |
| 5 | Doncaster Panthers | 36 | 25 | 11 | 0.694 | 50 |
| 6 | Leopards | 36 | 23 | 13 | 0.638 | 46 |
| 7 | Worthing Bears | 36 | 20 | 16 | 0.555 | 40 |
| 8 | Birmingham Bullets | 36 | 18 | 18 | 0.500 | 36 |
| 9 | Derby Bucks | 36 | 10 | 26 | 0.278 | 20 |
| 10 | Hemel Royals | 36 | 9 | 27 | 0.250 | 18 |
| 11 | Leicester City Riders | 36 | 8 | 28 | 0.222 | 16 |
| 12 | Chester Jets | 36 | 6 | 30 | 0.167 | 12 |
| 13 | Sunderland Scorpions | 36 | 4 | 32 | 0.111 | 8 |

| = League winners |
| = Qualified for the play-offs |

=== Playoffs ===
==== Quarter-finals ====
(1) Sheffield Sharks vs. (8) Birmingham Bullets

| Birmingham Bullets | 85–81 | Sheffield Sharks |

| Sheffield Sharks | 65–55 | Birmingham Bullets |

| Sheffield Sharks | 71–67 | Birmingham Bullets |
Sheffield win series, 2–1

(2) Thames Valley Tigers vs. (7) Worthing Bears

| Worthing Bears | 89–79 | Thames Valley Tigers |

| Thames Valley Tigers | 97–94 | Worthing Bears |

| Thames Valley Tigers | 81–85 | Worthing Bears |
Worthing win series, 2–1

(3) London Towers vs. (6) Leopards

| Leopards | 77–92 | London Towers |

| London Towers | 78–87 | Leopards |

| London Towers | 91–73 | Leopards |
London win series, 2–1

(4) Manchester Giants vs. (5) Doncaster Panthers

| Doncaster Panthers | 108–112 (OT) | Manchester Giants |

| Manchester Giants | 82–74 | Doncaster Panthers |
Manchester win series, 2–0

==== Semi-finals ====
29 April 1995

| Sheffield Sharks | 72–84 | Worthing Bears |

Wembley Arena, London

29 April 1995

| London Towers | 102–109 (OT) | Manchester Giants |

Wembley Arena, London

==== Final ====
Sky Sports 2

30 April 1995
16:30

| Worthing Bears | 77–73 | Manchester Giants |
Scoring by quarter: 23–12, 14–23, 9–21, 31–17
| Pts: Cunningham/Irish 19, Harried 17, Lewis 16; Rebs: Harried 13; Asts: Irish 5 MVP: Alan Cunningham | | Pts: Robinson 28, St. Kitts 20, Boden 10; Rebs: St. Kitts 11; Asts: Johnson 7 |

Wembley Arena, London
Attendance: 8,500
Worthing Coach Alan Cunningham
Manchester Coach Mike Hanks

== National League Division 1 (Tier 2) ==
=== Final standings ===
| Pos | Team | Pld | W | L | % | Pts |
|---|---|---|---|---|---|---|
| 1 | Crystal Palace | 22 | 21 | 1 | 0.955 | 42 |
| 2 | Coventry Crusaders | 22 | 18 | 4 | 0.818 | 36 |
| 3 | Ware Rebels | 22 | 17 | 5 | 0.773 | 34 |
| 4 | Oldham Celtics | 22 | 14 | 8 | 0.636 | 28 |
| 5 | Brixton TopCats | 22 | 13 | 9 | 0.591 | 26 |
| 6 | Stockton Mohawks | 22 | 10 | 12 | 0.455 | 20 |
| 7 | Bury Wildcats | 22 | 9 | 13 | 0.409 | 18 |
| 8 | Nottingham Cobras | 22 | 9 | 13 | 0.409 | 18 |
| 9 | Plymouth Raiders | 22 | 7 | 15 | 0.318 | 14 |
| 10 | Solent Stars | 22 | 7 | 15 | 0.318 | 14 |
| 11 | Slough Waterside | 22 | 6 | 16 | 0.273 | 12 |
| 12 | Swindon Sonics | 22 | 1 | 21 | 0.045 | 2 |

| = League winners |

== National League Division 2 (Tier 3) ==
=== Final standings ===
| Pos | Team | Pld | W | L | % | Pts |
|---|---|---|---|---|---|---|
| 1 | Cardiff Phoenix | 20 | 18 | 2 | 0.900 | 36 |
| 2 | Mid Sussex Magic | 20 | 15 | 5 | 0.750 | 30 |
| 3 | Worcester Chiefs | 20 | 12 | 8 | 0.600 | 24 |
| 4 | Liverpool Atac | 20 | 12 | 8 | 0.600 | 24 |
| 5 | Oxford Dons | 20 | 12 | 8 | 0.600 | 24 |
| 6 | South Bank | 20 | 10 | 10 | 0.500 | 20 |
| 7 | Westminster | 20 | 9 | 11 | 0.450 | 18 |
| 8 | Sheffield Forgers | 20 | 8 | 12 | 0.400 | 16 |
| 9 | Northampton 89ers | 20 | 7 | 13 | 0.350 | 14 |
| 10 | Stevenage Phoenix | 20 | 5 | 15 | 0.250 | 10 |
| 11 | Greenwich Admirals | 20 | 2 | 18 | 0.100 | 4 |

| = League winners |

== National Cup ==
=== Fourth round ===
| Team 1 | Team 2 | Score |
|---|---|---|
| Sheffield Sharks | Derby Bucks | 57–56 |
| Hemel Hempstead Royals | Leopards | 94–120 |
| Sunderland Scorpions | Doncaster Panthers | 94–99 |
| Ware Rebels | Birmingham Bullets | 94–110 |
| Chester Jets | Manchester Eagles | 78–76 |
| Worthing Bears | London Towers | 82–94 |
| Crystal Palace | Thames Valley Tigers | 60–74 |
| Coventry Crusaders | Leicester Riders | 79–83 |

=== Quarter-finals ===
| Team 1 | Team 2 | Score |
|---|---|---|
| Doncaster Panthers | Thames Valley Tigers | 59–78 |
| Leopards | London Towers | 76–75 |
| Chester Jets | Sheffield Sharks | 73–75 |
| Leicester City Riders | Birmingham Bullets | 79–99 |

=== Semi-finals ===
| Team 1 | Team 2 | 1st Leg | 2nd Leg |
|---|---|---|---|
| Leopards | Thames Valley Tigers | 86-80 | 83–99 |
| Sheffield Sharks | Birmingham Bullets | 71-72 | 73–68 |

=== Final ===
5 March 1995

| Sheffield Sharks | 89–66 | Thames Valley Tigers |
| Pts: Roger Huggins 29, Todd Cauthorn 21, Chris Finch 15 | | Pts: Steve Bucknall 24, Tony Holley 20, Peter Scantlebury 11 |

Sheffield Arena
Attendance: ?
Sheffield Coach Jim Brandon
Thames Valley Coach Mick Bett

== 7 Up Trophy ==
=== Group stage ===
North Group 1

| Team | Pts | Pld | W | L | Percent |
|---|---|---|---|---|---|
| 1.Doncaster Panthers | 10 | 6 | 5 | 1 | 0.833 |
| 2.Leicester City Riders | 8 | 6 | 4 | 2 | 0.667 |
| 3.Derby Bucks | 4 | 6 | 2 | 4 | 0.333 |
| 4.Sunderland Scorpions | 2 | 6 | 1 | 5 | 0.166 |

North Group 2

| Team | Pts | Pld | W | L | Percent |
|---|---|---|---|---|---|
| 1.Sheffield Sharks | 6 | 4 | 3 | 1 | 0.750 |
| 2.Manchester Giants | 8 | 4 | 3 | 1 | 0.750 |
| 3.Chester Jets | 0 | 4 | 0 | 4 | 0.000 |

South Group 1

| Team | Pts | Pld | W | L | Percent |
|---|---|---|---|---|---|
| 1.Thames Valley Tigers | 6 | 4 | 3 | 1 | 0.750 |
| 2.Birmingham Bullets | 6 | 4 | 3 | 1 | 0.750 |
| 3.Hemel Royals | 0 | 4 | 0 | 4 | 0.000 |

South Group 2

| Team | Pts | Pld | W | L | Percent |
|---|---|---|---|---|---|
| 1.Worthing Bears | 6 | 4 | 3 | 1 | 0.750 |
| 2.London Towers | 4 | 4 | 2 | 2 | 0.500 |
| 3.Leopards | 2 | 4 | 1 | 3 | 0.250 |

Sheffield finished ahead of Manchester by having the best head-to-head record between the teams. Thames Valley finished ahead of Birmingham by having the best head-to-head record between the teams.

=== Semi-finals ===
Doncaster Panthers vs. Sheffield Sharks

| Doncaster Panthers | 69–75 | Sheffield Sharks |

| Sheffield Sharks | 88–64 | Doncaster Panthers |
Sheffield win on aggregate, 163–133

Thames Valley Tigers vs. Worthing Bears

| Worthing Bears | 91–87 | Thames Valley Tigers |

| Thames Valley Tigers | 105–91 | Worthing Bears |
Thames Valley win on aggregate, 192–182

=== Final ===
13 January 1995

Report

| Thames Valley Tigers | 74–69 | Sheffield Sharks |
| Pts: Peter Scantlebury 21, Steve Bucknall 15, Tony Holley 14, Neville Austin | | Pts: Garnet Gayle 23, Roger Huggins 13, Ploutos Vourliotis, Todd Cauthorn |

National Exhibition Centre, Birmingham
Attendance: 4,000
Thames Valley Coach Mick Bett
Sheffield Coach Jim Brandon

== Seasonal awards ==
- Most Valuable Player: Roger Huggins (Sheffield Sharks)
- Coach of the Year: Jim Brandon (Sheffield Sharks)
- All-Star Team:
  - Roger Huggins (Sheffield Sharks)
  - Karl Brown (Leopards)
  - Steve Bucknall (London Towers)
  - Chris Fite (Doncaster Panthers)
  - Herman Harried (Worthing Bears)
  - Nigel Lloyd (Birmingham Bullets)
  - Mark Robinson (Manchester Giants)
  - Peter Scantlebury (Thames Valley Tigers)
  - Tony Windless (London Towers)
  - Robert Youngblood (Leopards)

| Preceded by 1993–94 season | BBL seasons 1994–95 | Succeeded by 1995–96 season |
