= Team Talbot, Guildford =

Team Talbot, Guildford was an English basketball team competing in the National Basketball League (NBL) for three seasons between 1979 and 1982. Prior to this the team was simply known as Southern Pirates or Guildford Pirates. When the club moved to play the 1982 – 83 season in Bracknell the Pirates nickname resurfaced. (Bracknell is about 60 miles from the nearest coast.)

== History ==
=== 1971 to 1979 ===
Team Talbot, Guildford was formed as the Southern Pirates, by Brian Naysmith and was based in Portsmouth, where the club had strong ties to the Southern Grammar School for Boys and Pòrtsmouth Technical High Schools "Portsmouth Pirates". The Southern Pirates were formed from the amalgamation of the two teams (1970-71?)

In 1957 Naysmith had started working at Southern as a PE teacher. He revived the school's Basketball program, making it a major sport in the school. Matches were arranged both locally but also nationally. From next to nothing Mr Naysmith made the team a powerful force at both county and National Level. The pinnacle of their success was in 1971 when the Southern Grammar School for Boys won the Schools (U-18 men) Championship Cup beating Kings Norton Boys School, Birmingham. The Kings Norton team of that era included Steve Assinder a GB and England International who played for Team Fiat. Also playing for Kings Norton was Andy Brown (basketball) who would go on the play for Team Talbot and coach Bracknell. Additionally, in 1971 the English Basket Ball Association's Junior Men's final Southern Pirates defeated Doncaster Panthers 72–39. At that time Barry Hitchcock (who would be the coach of Team Talbot, Guildford) was a PE teacher at Southern. Two of the pupils from this era Brian Hirschfield and Steven Bowden would go on to play for Team Talbot, Guildford in the NBL.

=== 1975/76 ===
In 1975 the Grammar school was turned into a comprehensive and Brian Naysmith was appointed to be Director of Sport at the University of Surrey at Guildford and the basketball club followed him. The move coincided with the expansion of the National Basketball League (NBL) to include a second division, which Guildford Pirates entered. Although they won only three games and finished sixth out of seven teams. In some ways, it was a case of what might have been, as Guildford's nine losses included six games lost by just 1 or 2 points. However at the end of the season Guildford dropped out of the NBL.

75–76	National Basketball League Division 2	6th (of 7)	Pld 12 W 3 L 9 F 839 A 836 Pts 15

75–76	National Basketball League Division 2								
	Opponents	Home	F	–	A	Away	F	–	A
1st	Vauxhall Motors (Bedford)	Lost	74	–	76	Lost	64	–	65
2nd	Stockport Belgrade	Lost	58	-	90	Lost	68	-	89
3rd	St Lukes (Exeter)	Lost	77	-	78	WON	76	-	74
4th	Mallory (Lewisham)	WON	86	-	60	Lost	68	-	74
5th	Nottingham	Lost	52	-	82	Lost	87	-	90
7th	Birmingham Bulldogs	Lost	60	-	61	WON	69	-	48

=== 1978/79 ===
After three years in the county leagues, Guildford Pirates rejoined the second division of the NBL for 1978–79 season. This was a much more successful campaign and Guildford ended the season as champions of the Second Division, with a 15–3 record. At that time, however, there was no automatic promotion or relegation between the two divisions of the NBL, so Guildford had to wait for an invitation to join the top tier, which duly arrived.

1978–79	National Basketball League Division 2	1st (out of 10)	Pld 18 W 15 L 3 F 1620 A 1426 Pts 38

Key Players

- (United States) Jim REHNQUIST – Amherst College – 6'4" Forward

The son of U.S. Supreme Court Justice William H. Rehnquist, Jim still holds the college records for most points in a single match (50), most points in a season (668) and highest season scoring average (27.8) A superbly accurate shooter—”probably the best I’ve ever seen in college ball,” said his coach, Rick Wilson, doubts over his ball handling and defense, ruled out any hopes of an NBA career. While playing in England he wrote articles on European basketball for the Washington Post

Team Talbot, Guildford 78/79 NBL2 – 17 games, 627 points at 36.9 points per game Playing with a power that belied his (lack of) height Jim was virtually unstoppable in his first season with Team Talbot'

- (United States) Dave FREDRICKSON, Regis College Denver, 6’6" forward

Selected for the All-RMAC first team in 1976/77 and 1977/78 Regis College: 76/77 and 77/78 Combined: 49 games 881 pts @ 18.0 ppg

Team Talbot, Guildford: 1978/79 NBL2 – 17 games, 495 points @ 29.1 ppg.

- (United States) Paul MAES, University of Northern Colorado 1975/76[1]

Only played Junior Varsity

Overall NBL record: 8 games, 140 points @ 17.5 ppg

1978–79	National Basketball League Division 2	1st (out of 10)	Pld 18 W 15 L 3 F 1620 A 1426 Pts 38

1978–79	National Basketball League Division 2								
	Opponents	Home	F	–	A	Away	F	–	A
2nd	Hemel Hempstead Lakers	WON	90	–	86	WON	85	–	77
3rd	Larsen Leeds Athletic Institute	Lost	75	-	90	Lost	71	-	82
4th	Telefusion Pacemakers Blackpool	WON	96	-	82	WON	99	-	85
5th	Nottingham	Lost	89	-	97	WON	87	-	85
6th	Brighton Rucanor	WON	102	-	94	WON	99	-	83
7th	Bromley	WON	105	-	91	WON	103	-	86
8th	Maidenhead Sonics	WON	104	-	73	WON	83	-	73
9th	Birmingham Bulldogs	WON	73	-	66	WON	123	-	101
10th	Derby CFE	WON	99	-	65	WON	133	-	92

=== 1979–80 ===
Division 1 in 1979–80 showed many changes with four teams dropping out of Division 1. Exeter St Lukes TSB joined Division 2 whilst the Embassy Milton Keynes All-Stars, Loughborough All-Stars and Bracknell Bullets left the NBL altogether. Three teams were invited to step up, the NBL2 Champions with a new sponsorship Team Talbot, Guildford, (the NBL Division 2 Champions), the runners-up Hemel Hempstead, (with new sponsors Ovaltine) and 4th placed Blackpool joined Division One. Additionally the London Metros moved from London to Kingston, in Surrey, where, also with new sponsors they became Kelly Girl International Kingston.

- (United States) Jim REHNQUIST – Amherst College – 6'4" Forward

Team Talbot retained the services of Jim Rehnquist and it is an indication of his shooting prowess that he managed to be the fifth highest scorer in the league in a struggling team.

Team Talbot, Guildford 78/79 NBL1 – 17 games, 478 points at 28.1 points per game. (N.B. some sources have the number of games he played as 18. but he did not play in the away game against Crystal Palace.

- (United States) Lawrence ‘Lanky’ WELLS – Louisiana Tech – 6'6" Forward

Lanky attended Louisiana Tech for 4 years, playing 98 games and averaging 16.4 ppg. Wells was a three-time All-Southland Conference selection. Later completing his undergraduate degree at Northwestern State University.

Team Talbot, Guildford 78/79 NBL1 – 9 games, 206 points at 22.9 points per game.

Reverend Lawrence Albert "Lanky" Wells died in January 2017.

- (United States) Bob LANDES – Holy Cross – 6'8" Centre

Bob Landes also played for Brunel in the NBL. At Holy Cross where he played 55 games, scoring 76 points at 1.4 ppg in his senior year his teammates included Leo Kane a future Team Talbot player and Tom Seaman who played for Bracknell Pirates and Crystal Palace.

Team Talbot, Guildford 78/79 NBL (Overall) – 13 games, 279 points at 21.5 points per game.

Talbot struggled to make an impact, finishing last out of the ten clubs with a 2–16 record. In the absence of automatic promotion and relegation they remained in Division 1 for the following season.

1979–80	National Basketball League Division 1	10th (out of 10)	Pld 18 W 2 L 16 F 1592 A 1837 Pts 4

1979–80	National Basketball League Division 1								
	Opponents	Home	F	–	A	Away	F	–	A
1st	Crystal Palace	Lost	77	–	108	Lost	78	–	106
2nd	Team Ziebart Doncaster	Lost	91	–	98	Lost	107	–	111
3rd	Team Fiat Coventry	Lost	75	–	92	Lost	83	–	99
4th	Ovaltine Hemel Hempstead	Lost	72	-	101	Lost	81	–	90
5th	Kelly Girl International Kingston	Lost	93	–	115	Lost	107	–	126
6th	Sunblest Sunderland	Lost	90	–	94	Lost	89	–	110
7th	Stockport Belgrade	Lost	90	–	112	Lost	92	–	109
8th	ATS Giants Manchester	WON	104	–	96	Lost	94	-	98
9th	Blackpool	WON	94	–	83	Lost	75	-	89

=== 1980–81 ===
Facing a second season of struggle Team Talbot began with two new Americans, John Goedeke and Dave Winey, supported by two Dual Internationals. Firstly Irishman Leo Kane who contributed 150 points in 13 games @ 11.5 ppg. The second was Welshman Nigel Probert. Dual nationality was a controversial topic, as some players were eligible to play for England but classed as an American for their club. Goedeke had a successful season, ending it as the 4th highest scorer in the league with 443 points and his 24.6 ppg ranked 6th. However Winey was replaced after 5 games by Mark Haymore, who made significant contributions. American/Greek Chris Bavelles who played his College ball at California Lutheran scored 16 points and handed out 9 assists. Haymore was the leading rebounder with 14.6 per game and shot an impressive 60.7% from the field, netting 264 points in just 10 games and his 26.4 ppg rated 4th overall. The 4–14 record the club posted was enough to lift them into 9th place in the ten team division. There was also the success of the newly formed Junior Men (under 18) who, coached by Kevin Hibbs, finished second behind Crystal Palace Falcons in the Southern Division of the Junior Men's league. Their record was Pld 10 W 8 L 2 f 814 a 711 Pts 16 In the National Junior Championship Semi-finals they met Team Fiat, Birmingham. In the away tie Fiat won 63 – 57. In the home tie Team Talbot lost another close match 57 – 60, leaving the aggregate score Talbot 114 Fiat 123. Team Fiat went on to win the final beating Crystal Palace 69–59.

1980–81	National Basketball League Division 1	9th (out of 10)	Pld 18 W 4 L 14 F 1470 A 1730 Pts 8

=== 1981–82 ===
Their third season saw Division One expand to twelve teams with the admission of the three top teams from the previous season's second division; the Solent Stars, TCB Brighton and Liverpool. Blackpool Pacemakers dropped out. Stockport Belgrade took the decision to move away to the new Spectrum Arena in Warrington becoming Birchwood Warrington Vikings. Team Talbot, Guildford again showed improvement with a 6–16 record that included two wins against leading teams. There were three American players used Robin Jones, an NBA championship winner with the Portland Trail Blazers, Darren Pierce and Larry McKinney. Jones and McKinney made strong contributions while Pierce was fourth in the league in scoring and second on his team in rebounding. The Junior (u-18) Men's team tasted success again winning the Junior Men's National Cup beating Team Fiat Birmingham 86–63 and reaching the Final of the National Championships Play-offs where they finished as runners-up to Crystal Palace. More importantly for the future, players from the Junior squad, most importantly Peter Scantlebury, began to appear on the Senior Men's roster.

1981–82	National Basketball League Division 1	10th (out of 12)	Pld 22 W 6 L 16 F 1811 A 2005 Pts 12

At the end of the season it was announced that the franchise would be moving to Bracknell, under new ownership. The Pirates name survived for a while, before the new franchise morphed into the Thames Valley Tigers.

== Former players and Coaches ==
- (United Kingdom) Steven Bowden
- (United States) Chris Bavelles
- (United Kingdom) Andy Brown
- (United States) Dave Fredrickson
- (United States) John Goedeke
- (United States) Mark Haymore
- (United Kingdom) Brian Hirschfield
- (United Kingdom) Barry Hitchcock – coach
- (United States) Robin Jones
- (Republic of Ireland) Leo Kane
- (United States) Bob Landes
- (United States) Larry McKinney
- (United Kingdom) Brian Naysmith – founder and coach
- (United Kingdom) Ken Nottage
- (United States) Darrin Pierce
- (United States) Jim Rehnquist
- (United Kingdom) Peter Scantlebury (u-19 junior)
- (United Kingdom) Sam Stiller (u-19 junior)
- (United States) Laurence ‘Lanky’ Wells

== Sources ==
- Basketball Review 1981–82 edited by Richard Taylor
- Information from John Atkinson, now housed in the National Basketball Heritage Archive and Study Centre Worcester University
- Home – the website created by old boys of the school
