= London Towers =

British basketball team based in London, England

- League: British Basketball League and EBL Division 3
- Established: 1984
- Folded: 2009
- History: Tower Hamlets; 1984–1989; London Docklands; 1989–1991; London Towers; 1991–2009
- Location: London, Greater London
- Team colours: Yellow, black, white
- Ownership: Costi Zombanakis
Home	Away

London Towers were a professional basketball team based in London, England. They enjoyed considerable success in the 1990s and early 2000s, collecting 3 titles in the British Basketball League (BBL) as well as regularly competing in European competitions such as the Euroleague and EuroCup. They contested a fierce rivalry with fellow London team Greater London Leopards for much of this spell. After several years of decline with financial difficulties and venue issues, owner Costi Zombanakis pulled the first team from the BBL in the summer of 2006, and although the club's second team continued in the regional English Basketball League, the London Towers brand folded in 2009.

== Franchise history ==
=== High risers ===
Established as Tower Hamlets, in the borough of the same name, the London-based team entered NBL Division 2 in 1984. By 1989 they finished eleventh, out of the eleven teams in the league and were due to be relegated. However, the Carlsberg League Division 1 was suffering a membership crisis at the time and was about to be reduced to just seven teams. With the newly built Docklands Arena available as a possible venue not too far from the team's base, the Tower Hamlets franchise was admitted to country's top professional league as London's representatives, rebranded as London Docklands for the 1989-90 season.

=== On the move again ===
The following season the Docklands team left the giant arena as they, in common with other basketball teams at the time, struggled with the cost of a big arena rent. They returned "home" to Tower Hamlets and the Newham Leisure Centre, although their first two seasons yielded just three League victories.

=== Towers rise ===
It was 1991 when the franchise which came to sit astride British basketball finally gained its most well-known label. Renamed London Towers, but still playing at Newham the club's fortunes turned around in the 1991-92 season, as they finished fourth, and a move to the Sobell Sports Centre in Islington saw them finish third in 1993.

=== The Wembley Days ===
In 1994 the Towers made the short move across North London to the prestigious Wembley Arena complex, splitting home games between the Arena itself and the adjacent Exhibition halls. It was here that they enjoyed their best seasons, winning multiple titles including the Budweiser League Championship, League Playoffs and 7-up trophy.

The 1996-97 season also saw the Towers make their European debut appearance, competing in the newly named EuroCup. After qualifying from the group stage with a 4–6 record, they exited the competition in the first knockout round losing to Avtodor Saratov of Russia by five points over two legs. The following season also saw them take part in the Eurocup, however this time they finished bottom of their group with a 1–9 record.

=== Heading South ===
With their Wembley venue proving expensive and presenting problems for European competitions, in the summer of 1998 Towers "merged" with fellow BBL team Crystal Palace. The 1998–1999 season saw games split between Wembley and Crystal Palace National Sports Centre, with the team moving full time to Crystal Palace for the following season.

Towers continued to be one of the British Basketball League's top teams, winning Southern Conference titles and the Uniball Trophy. They also regularly competed in European competitions such as the Saporta Cup, NEBL (Northern European Basketball League), and even the prestigious Euroleague for two seasons, coached by NBA Championship winning coach Nick Nurse in one of these years.

The team declined entering the ULEB Cup in the 2002–2003 season.

=== The End ===
Despite working on plans to build their own arena for a number of years, linking with their community and development work, in 2006 the London Towers first team pulled out of BBL, for a "one year break". In common with at least two other teams who followed this path at around the same time, they were never to return. The recently started second team, London Towers II, continued to fly the flag for a few seasons, competing in the English Basketball League Division 3 and operating the club's youth and development teams, before also folding.

== Head coaches ==
- Mark Dunning
- Kevin Cadle
- Lino Frattin
- Ron Abegglen
- Nick Nurse
- David Lindstrom
- Robbie Peers
- Gary Lyttle

Assistant Coaches - Tony Garbelotto, Andre Alleyne, Graham Wilson, Darren Johnson, Alex Fuhrmann, Julian Martinez, Joe Lofthouse.

== Season-by-season records ==
Seasons 1984-1991
Season	Division	Tier	Regular Season						Post-Season	Cup	Trophy	Head coach
Season	Division	Tier	Finish	Played	Wins	Losses	Points	Win %	Post-Season	Cup	Trophy	Head coach
Tower Hamlets
1984–85	NBL 2	II										
1985–86	NBL 2	II										
1986–87	NBL 2	II										
1987–88	NBL 1	II										
1988–89	NBL 1	II										
London Docklands
1989–90	BBL	I	8th	28	2	26	4	0.071	Did not qualify	Last 16	Pool Stage	
1990–91	BBL	I	9th	24	1	23	2	0.041	Did not qualify	Last 16	Pool Stage	

Season	Division	Tier	Regular Season						Post-Season	Cup	Trophy	Head coach
Season	Division	Tier	Finish	Played	Wins	Losses	Points	Win %	Post-Season	Cup	Trophy	Head coach
London Towers
1991–92	BBL	I	4th	30	21	9	42	0.700	Semi-finals	Last 16	Semi-finals	
1992–93	BBL	I	3rd	33	25	8	50	0.757	Semi-finals	Last 16	Pool Stage	
1993–94	BBL	I	5th	36	21	15	42	0.583	Quarter-finals	Last 16	Pool Stage	Mark Dunning
1994–95	BBL	I	3rd	36	28	8	56	0.777	Semi-finals	Quarter-finals	Pool Stage	
1995–96	BBL	I	1st	36	32	4	64	0.889	Runners Up, losing to Birmingham	Winners, beating Sheffield	Winners, beating Worthing	Kevin Cadle
1996–97	BBL	I	2nd	36	26	10	52	0.722	Winners, beating Leopards	Semi-finals	Winners, beating Chester	Kevin Cadle
1997–98	BBL	I	6th	36	23	13	46	0.638	Semi-finals	Semi-finals	Runners Up, losing to Sheffield	Kevin Cadle
1998–99	BBL	I	3rd	36	24	12	48	0.667	Winners, beating Thames Valley	Last 16	Quarter-finals	Lino Frattin
1999–00	BBL S	I	1st	34	23	11	46	0.676	Semi-finals	Quarter-finals	Winners, beating Manchester	Ron Abegglen
2000–01	BBL S	I	1st	34	27	7	54	0.794	Semi-finals	Semi-finals	Competed in Euroleague	Nick Nurse
2001–02	BBL S	I	1st	32	21	11	42	0.656	Semi-finals	Last 16	Semi-finals	Lino Frattin; David Lindstrom
2002–03	BBL	I	7th	40	19	21	38	0.475	Quarter-finals	Semi-finals	Runners Up, losing to Chester	David Lindstrom
2003–04	BBL	I	3rd	36	23	13	46	0.638	Semi-finals	Semi-finals	Semi-finals	Robbie Peers
2004–05	BBL	I	3rd	40	29	11	58	0.725	Quarter-finals	1st round	Semi-finals	Robbie Peers
2005–06	BBL	I	4th	40	22	18	44	0.550	Quarter-finals	Runners Up, losing to Newcastle	Pool Stage	Robbie Peers

== Home arenas ==
London Arena (1989–1991)
Newham Leisure Centre (1991–1992)
Sobell Sports Centre (1992–1994)
Wembley Arena (1994–1999) - split games between Crystal Palace from 1998.
Crystal Palace Sports Centre (1998–2007) - split games between Wembley Arena until 1999.
Harris Sports Centre (2007–2009)

== Trophies ==
- 1995/96 League Champions, National Cup Winners, League Trophy Winners
- 1996/97 Championship Winners, League Trophy Winners
- 1998/99 Tournament of Champions Winners, Championship Winners
- 1999/00 Southern Conference Champions, League Trophy Winners
- 2000/01 Tournament of Champions Winners, Southern Conference Champions

== Sources ==
- "Basketball: London Towers season preview". Your Local Guardian. 19 September 2001. Archived from the original on 1 September 2026.
- "Kevin Cadle, former basketball coach and Sky presenter, dies aged 62". The Guardian. 16 October 2017. Archived from the original on 4 December 2025.
- "Kevin Cadle, former Sky Sports NFL presenter, dies aged 62". Sky Sports. 16 October 2017. Archived from the original on 7 November 2023.
- Chaudry, Ziad (19 January 2016). "Basketball: American star has fond memories his time with Crystal Palace outfit". Your Local Guardian. Archived from the original on 8 October 2018.
- Dugdale, Rob (30 July 2006). "Towers owner to suspend franchise for new season". The Guardian. Archived from the original on 6 February 2026.
- Taylor, Richard (15 July 2002). "Basketball: Towers reject chance to play in European tournament". The Independent. Archived from the original on 4 February 2026.
