= Geno Crandall =

American basketball player (born 1996)

No. 9 – Benfica
- Position: Point guard
- League: Liga Portuguesa de Basquetebol

Personal information
- Born: October 21, 1996 (age 30) Minneapolis, Minnesota, U.S.
- Listed height: 6 ft 3 in (1.91 m)
- Listed weight: 175 lb (79 kg)

Career information
- High school: DeLaSalle (Minneapolis, Minnesota)
- College: North Dakota (2014–2018); Gonzaga (2018–2019)
- NBA draft: 2019: undrafted
- Playing career: 2019–present

Career history
- 2019–2020: Tuři Svitavy
- 2020–2022: Leicester Riders
- 2022–2023: BG Göttingen
- 2023: Hapoel Be'er Sheva
- 2023–2025: EWE Baskets Oldenburg
- 2025–present: Benfica

Career highlights
- 2× BBL Most Valuable Player (2021, 2022); BBL Play-off Final MVP (2022); BBL Cup Most Valuable Player (2022); 2× Second-team all Big Sky (2017, 2018)

Geno Crandall (born October 21, 1996) is an American professional basketball player for Benfica of the Liga Portuguesa de Basquetebol. Crandall spent four seasons playing basketball at the University of North Dakota before transferring to Gonzaga University as a redshirt senior. As a professional, Crandall was named MVP of the British Basketball League twice, back-to-back in 2021 and 2022, before moving to BG Göttingen ahead of the 2022-23 season.

== Early life ==
Crandall played high school basketball at DeLaSalle in his hometown of Minneapolis, Minnesota. While there he was part of three straight state championship winning teams. He was named Tri-Metro All-Conference in his junior and senior years. Despite the championships and individual honors, Crandall was lightly recruited coming out of high school. He was unranked as a prospect in the class of 2014. In the fall of his senior season, he committed to play his college basketball at North Dakota.

== College career ==
In his first collegiate season, Crandall sat out as a redshirt.

When Crandall made it onto the court as a redshirt freshman in the 2015–16 season he made an immediate impact. Crandall played in 31 of the team's 33 games that season and made 27 starts. He averaged 10.8 points per game, good for second on the team.

As a redshirt sophomore, Crandall was North Dakota's second leading scorer, averaging 15.5 points per game. He was named to the all-Big Sky second team at the end of the season. That season, North Dakota won the Big Sky regular season and conference tournament, and earned its first trip to the NCAA tournament in program history.

Crandall put up the biggest numbers of his collegiate career as a redshirt junior in the 2017–18 season by averaging a team high 16.6 points per game. He was once again named to the all-Big Sky second team. Notably, Crandall scored a game-high 28 points on the road against No. 12 ranked Gonzaga. Crandall led the Fighting Hawks to a near-upset of the defending national runner's up but ultimately fell short in overtime. Crandall would transfer to Gonzaga the following season.

When he left North Dakota, Crandall's 1,355 points scored ranked 14th in program history, his 381 assists ranked seventh and his 190 steals ranked fourth.

After completing his junior season, Crandall graduated from North Dakota with one year of eligibility remaining. Because he was a graduate, he was eligible to play the following season without having to sit out as a transfer redshirt. In July it was announced that Crandall would be transferring to Gonzaga, where he was expected to provide depth in an otherwise thin back court. The Bulldogs had Josh Perkins as a redshirt senior point guard, and future NBA players Joel Ayayi, Corey Kispert and Zach Norvell in the backcourt as well, but all three were underclassmen, and Perkins was the only primary ball-handler on the roster. At Gonzaga, Crandall's primary role was as back-up point guard. He was known for his energy, basketball IQ and defensive effort which helped him quickly mesh with his new teammates. Days after helping Gonzaga win the 2018 Maui Invitational, Crandall suffered a broken hand and was expected to miss up to six weeks.

Crandall missed nine straight games due to his hand injury, but returned for the West Coast Conference opener against Santa Clara on January 5, 2019. He averaged 5 points and 18.4 minutes per game during his season at Gonzaga and helped the Bulldogs earn a No. 1 ranking in the AP Top-25, 1 seed in the NCAA Tournament and advanced to the Elite Eight.

== Professional career ==
Undrafted in the 2019 NBA draft, Crandall signed with Tuři Svitavy of the Czech NBL. Crandall averaged 14 points and 2.1 steals as he helped Tuři Svitavy to third place in the league standings at the time the season was cancelled due to the coronavirus pandemic.

After his first professional season, Crandall left the Czech Republic for England where he signed with the Leicester Riders of the British Basketball League. His first season in England was a massive success both for him individually and for his team as a whole. Crandall was second in the BBL in assists, fourth in steals and ninth in scoring on the season. The Riders earned the BBL regular season title and Crandall was named the league's Most Valuable Player. In May 2021, Crandall re-signed with Leicester for the upcoming season. Crandall averaged 13.1 points and 6.8 assists on 50% from the field as the Riders won a BBL treble of the Cup, regular league and playoff final. He was their star player, and won MVP again as well as Finals MVP.

On July 29, 2022, Crandall signed a contract with BG Göttingen for the 2022-23 Basketball Bundesliga season.

Crandall agreed to a deal with Hapoel Be'er Sheva in the Israeli Basketball Premier League ahead of the 2023-24 season.

On November 14, 2023, he signed with EWE Baskets Oldenburg of the German Basketball Bundesliga (BBL).

On August 17, 2025, he signed with Benfica of the Liga Portuguesa de Basquetebol.

== Career statistics ==
| Season | Team | League | GP | GS | MPG | FG% | 3P% | FT% | RPG | APG | SPG | BPG | PPG |
|---|---|---|---|---|---|---|---|---|---|---|---|---|---|
| 2019–20 | Tuři Svitavy | NBL | 28 | 24 | 26.7 | .435 | .253 | .669 | 4.4 | 3.7 | 2.1 | 0.1 | 13.9 |
| 2020–21 | Leicester Riders | BBL | 31 | 28 | 29.3 | .481 | .337 | .789 | 5.7 | 8.0 | 1.9 | 0.2 | 15.6 |
| 2021-22 | Leicester Riders | BBL | 26 | N/A | 26.2 | .500 | .395 | .773 | 5 | 6.8 | 1.8 | 0.5 | 13.1 |
