= Clyde Vaughan =

American basketball player and coach

Clyde Vaughan (born in Mount Vernon, New York, United States) is a basketball coach and former professional player, who enjoyed a distinguished career at college level and professional level and international level for the England team. He was also selected as the 117th pick in 1984 NBA draft by the Indiana Pacers but never appeared in the NBA.

The 6 foot 4 small forward played college basketball for the Pittsburgh Panthers. Though he only played his last two seasons in the Big East Conference, they were the best two seasons of his career. As a junior, he averaged 21.9 ppg and grabbed 9.2 rpg. His 22.0 ppg average in conference led the league. As a senior, he added another 21.0 ppg and 8.3 rebounds. In his four years at the Panthers (1980–1984), Vaughan finished with a tally of 2,033 points scored and 922 rebounds. 2,033 points was a Pitt school record that was later surpassed by Charles Smith 2,045.

After being selected as the 117th pick in the 6th round of the 1984 NBA Draft with the Indiana Pacers, Vaughan was one of the final-cuts in training camp so instead went on to enjoy seven successful season's playing in England. He still ranks third on the all-time scoring average list, averaging 28.2 points per game. His 4,766 career points are 20th in league history and he is tenth in free throw shooting percentage at 83.2%. He averaged 7.9 rebounds per game and shot 57.9% from the floor, both among the career leaders in those categories. He was the BBL Player of the Year in 1989–90 whilst with Sunderland Saints and made 27 appearances for the English National Team. but his playing career came to an end with several back problems during his final season in Europe.

Following his successful player career, Vaughan took a coaching job in 1992 with Long Beach State University, first as an assistant coach (1992–93 through 1996–97) and then as the associate head coach (1997–98 through 1998–99). From 1999 to 2002, he was assistant coach at the University of South Florida before taking the assistant coach job at UConn and the Huskies in 2002.

In August 2004, Vaughan was arrested for patronizing a prostitute during an undercover police sting and immediately resigned from his post at the Huskies.
