= Nigel Lloyd =

Barbadian-British basketball player and coach (born 1961)

Personal information
- Born: 13 September 1961 (age 65) Barbados
- Listed height: 6 ft 3 in (1.91 m)

Career information
- College: United States International University
- Position: Point guard

Career history

Playing
- 1984–1986: Hemel Hempstead Lakers
- 1986–1987: Manchester United BC
- 1987: Cincinnati Slammers
- 1987–1988: Leicester Riders
- 1991–1994: Thames Valley Tigers
- 1994–1999: Birmingham Bullets
- 1999: Berger Senators
- 1999–2000: Birmingham Bullets
- 2000: Berger Senators
- 2000–2002: Milton Keynes Lions (player-coach)

Coaching
- 1998–1999: Birmingham Bullets (assistant coach)
- 2000–2006: Milton Keynes Lions
- 2007–2008: Birmingham Panthers
- 2012–2013: London Lions (assistant coach)
- 2015–2017: London Lions
- 2024–present: Thames Valley Cavaliers

Nigel A Lloyd is a Barbadian-British basketball coach and former player.

== Career ==
Born in Barbados, Lloyd came to the United States at age 6. He first picked up a basketball in Brooklyn, New York. In the 1980s, he attended the United States International University in San Diego, California, averaging 23.1 points a game his senior season (1982–83).

Lloyd embarked on a professional career, which first took him to the Hemel Hempstead Lakers in 1984. In 1985, he played for the NBA’s Los Angeles Clippers in the Southern California Pro Summer League and subsequently received an invitation to attend the Clippers’ fall training camp. Lloyd was cut from their roster on October 8, 1985. The following year, he took part in the Clippers’ rookie/free agent camp and then joined the team in its regular season training camp. On October 3, 1986, he was signed by the Clippers, but did not make the final roster.

Lloyd continued his career in Great Britain, playing for Manchester United BC in 1986–87, before joining CBA’s Cincinnati Slammers in the US in the course of the season.

His career highlights in the British Basketball League (BBL) include winning the 1995–96 and the 1997-98 championship, the 1993-94 League title and winning the BBL Trophy in 1992-93 and 1993–94. In January 1993, he won the World Invitation Club Basketball with the Thames Valley Tigers, scoring a game-high 35 points in the final against CSKA Moscow.

Lloyd garnered Player of the Year honours in Great Britain for the 1993–94 season and set a record for the most BBL All-Star Game selections. He also became the all-time BBL leader in free throws made and placed himself second on the league's all-time scoring list. While playing for the Birmingham Bullets, Lloyd was nicknamed The Lord. Among his biggest strengths as a basketball player were the ability to control the tempo of the game and to hit three-pointers at key moments.

In 2000, Lloyd became player-coach of the Milton Keynes Lions, before continuing as head coach alone after two years. He left the Lions in 2006 and was appointed as head coach of the Birmingham Panthers in 2007. The team ceased operations following the 2007-08 campaign. Lloyd, who became a basketball teacher at St Paul's Catholic School, stepped into the assistant role, serving under Vince Macaulay at the London Lions during the 2012–13 season. The Lions hired Lloyd as head coach in 2015, he resigned from the position in 2017.

In 2024, Lloyd returned to the bench to take the reins at the Thames Valley Cavaliers.

=== National team ===
As a member of the Barbados national team, Lloyd was instrumental in helping the squad win the 1994 and 2000 CARICOM championships. He later became the head coach of the team which he coached at tournaments including the 2006 Commonwealth Games.
