= Peter Scantlebury =

British basketball player and coach who is now a staff member at Aston academy

Personal information
- Born: 21 November 1963 (age 62) Camberwell, London, England

Career information
- College: Winthrop (1984–1985)
- NBA draft: 1985: undrafted
- Playing career: 1981–2003

Career history

Playing
- 1981–1984: Guildford / Bracknell Pirates
- 1985–1989: Bracknell Pirates /Tigers
- 1989–1990: Sunderland
- 1991–1993: London Towers
- 1993–1997: Thames Valley Tigers
- 1997–1998: Newcastle Eagles
- 1998–2003: Sheffield Sharks
- 1986–2002: England

Coaching
- 2003–2008: Sheffield Sharks
- 2004–2006: England

Peter Scantlebury MBE (born 21 November 1963) is a former international professional basketball player who was capped 131 times for England.

Scantlebury began his playing career in 1981 with Guildford. He scored 9,502 points and won nine British Basketball League winners' medals in his National League career. He made his debut for England in 1986 and scored 1,069 points in an international career that lasted until 2002. He was appointed an MBE in 2002 for his services to basketball.

He was appointed head coach of Sheffield Sharks in 2003, leading them to the Haribo Cup trophy and BBL Championship play-off title in 2004, and was appointed head coach of England's men's basketball team in 2004, coaching them to a bronze medal at the Commonwealth Games in Melbourne in 2006.

Also now he is a pastoral learning lead in for Aston Academy, a high school in Swallownest, England.

== Coaching careers ==
- 2003–2008 Sheffield Sharks
- 2004–2006 England national team – Won Bronze at the 2006 Commonwealth Games

== Playing career ==
- 1998–2003 Sheffield Sharks
- 1997–1998 Newcastle Eagles
- 1993–1997 Thames Valley Tigers
- 1991–1993 London Towers
- 1989–1990 Sunderland
- 1985–1989 Bracknell Pirates /Tigers
- 1984–1985 Winthrop University
- 1981–1984 Guildford / Bracknell Pirates
