= Alton Byrd =

American basketball player (born 1957)

Chattanooga FC
- Title: Chief executive officer

Personal information
- Born: March 11, 1957 (age 69) San Francisco, California, U.S.
- Listed height: 5 ft 9 in (1.75 m)

Career information
- High school: Archbishop Riordan (San Francisco, California)
- College: Columbia (1976–1979)
- NBA draft: 1979: 10th round, 186th overall pick
- Drafted by: Boston Celtics
- Playing career: 1979–1997
- Position: Point guard

Career history
- 1979–1982: Crystal Palace
- 1983–1987: Murray International
- 1987–1988: Manchester United
- 1989–1992: Kingston Kings
- 1992–1994: Guildford Kings
- 1994–1997: Crystal Palace

Career highlights
- 5× Scottish League champion; 4 xBBL MVP (1980, 1981, 1991, 1992); Frances Pomeroy Naismith Award (1979); 3× First Team All-Ivy League (1977–1979)
- Stats at Basketball Reference

Joseph Alton Byrd (born November 3, 1957) is an American-British former professional basketball player who is the former chief executive officer of Chattanooga FC of the MLS Next Pro.

He grew up in the San Francisco area, where he was a high school basketball star. He continued to be a basketball star at Columbia University, where he was one of the best point guards in the country in spite of his small stature. His height was usually officially listed as 5 feet 9 inches (1.75 m). He holds the school records for career assists (526) and assists in a single season (210).

After receiving his bachelor's degree from Columbia College in 1979, he attended the Boston Celtics rookie camp, but, suffering with a foot injury, he did not get a contract and joined Crystal Palace of the British Basketball League. During his rookie season, he led Palace to a 50–5 record. He later started for teams in Edinburgh, Manchester, Guildford and Kingston. In 1984 he became a British citizen and made his debut for England.

Off the court, he pursued a variety of broadcasting and business ventures, including a weekly show on BBC Radio 5 Live dedicated to American sports. From 1997 to 1999, he was the general manager of the London Monarchs of NFL Europe, while there he guided the team to rebrand as the England Monarchs, before ultimately transitioning the team to Berlin after a 1998 season that ended with a 3–7 record, after three straight 4–6 tallies.

In 1999, he returned to the United States to be a vice president of strategic alliances for the Sacramento Kings. In 2002, he then founded a management consulting company, Clear Focus Consulting. In September 2013, the Atlanta Dream hired him as the chief revenue officer. On March 24, 2016, the Brooklyn Nets hired Alton Byrd as the vice president of business operations.

Byrd continued with the Nets organization through July 2023 as the Senior Vice President-Growth Properties/Community Relations for BSE Global Long Island Nets of the NBA G League and Nets Gaming of NBA 2K League.

Byrd was the chief executive officer of Chattanooga FC from July 2023 to December 2024.
