= Kevin Cadle =

American-British sports broadcaster and basketball coach (1955–2017)

- Born: 17 March 1955; Buffalo, New York, U.S.
- Died: 16 October 2017 (aged 62); London, England
- Occupations: Sports broadcaster, basketball coach
- Years active: 1984–2017

Kevin Cadle (17 March 1955 – 16 October 2017) was a British-based American sports presenter and former basketball coach.

Cadle was born in Buffalo, New York in 1955. After retiring from coaching in 1997, Cadle presented American football and NBA programming for Sky Sports. Cadle also ran his own channel on YouTube called The SportsHeads, providing honest commentary on the NFL and NBA for a UK audience.

He supported the Buffalo Bills.

Cadle unexpectedly died on the morning of October 16, 2017.

== Coaching accomplishments ==
- British Basketball League Champions 1989, 1990, 1991, 1992, 1996
- BBL play-off Champions 1989, 1990, 1991, 1992, 1997
- BBL Cup Winners 1987, 1988, 1989, 1990, 1991
- BBL Trophy Winners 1996, 1997
- Scottish Cup Winners 1984, 1985
- Scottish Play-Off Champions 1984, 1985
- English Cup Champions 1986, 1987, 1989, 1990, 1991, 1993, 1996
- World Invitation Club Tournament Champions (WICB) 1990, 1992

=== Coaching record ===
- Scottish Coach of the Year 1984, 1985
- English Coach of the Year 1987, 1989, 1990, 1991, 1992, 1996
- Scottish Men's National Team Head Coach 1984, 1985
- English Men's National Team Head Coach 1991–1993
- Great Britain Men's National Team Head Coach 1991–1992

=== Special coaching accomplishments ===
- Placed in the Guinness Book of Records – "Most Successful Team Ever in British Sport" 1989/1990
- Repeated in 1991/1992 Season
- British record of more than 300 career league victories – 1998
- Voted into the "Top 50 Most Influential Sportsperson" in Britain – 1996
- Final grouping of the European Club Champions Cup – First Time Ever in Britain 1990/1991 Season: Ranked Number 6 in Europe
- Repeated in 1993/1994 Season
- Final grouping of the European Cup Winners Cup – 1987/1988 Season
- First coach to be inducted into the British Basketball League's (BBL) Hall of Fame
- BBL Player of the Month award named in his honour - the Molten Kevin Cadle Player of the Month award
- Voted into the Greater Buffalo Sports Hall of Fame
