= Thames Valley Tigers =

- League: British Basketball League
- Established: 1975
- Folded: 2005
- History: Southern Pirates; 1975; Guildford Pirates; 1975–1979; Team Talbot, Guildford; 1979–1982; Bracknell Pirates; 1982–1987; Bracknell Tigers; 1987–1990; Thames Valley Tigers; 1990–2005
- Location: Bracknell, Berkshire
- Team colors: Orange, Marine Blue. Turquoise blue and white
- Ownership: John Nike
Home	Away	Third

Thames Valley Tigers was a British professional basketball team that competed in the British Basketball League (BBL) until 2005, when funding was ceased and the franchise folded. Based in Bracknell, Berkshire, the team's fans set up a new team to replace the Tigers and a month later the Guildford Heat was born. Playing in the nearby town of Guildford, at the Spectrum complex, the team started the 2005–06 British Basketball League season with many of the former Tigers players.

== Franchise history ==
The franchise originally started out as the Southern Pirates, playing out of the city of Portsmouth, however they were soon moved inland in 1975 to the town of Guildford, following their coach, Brian Naysmith who had been appointed Director of Sport at the University of Surrey. The name Southern Pirates was retained at first before being renamed Guildford Pirates. In the 1978–79 season Guildford Pirates were champions of the Second Division of the National Basketball League and accepted an invitation to join the top tier. Known as Team Talbot Guildford Pirates following a sponsorship deal, the franchise spent three seasons in Guildford. The team struggled in NBL Division 1, although they improved each year. The Junior (U-18) Men were more successful winning the National (U-18) Cup.

In 1982, the Pirates moved again to nearby Bracknell, becoming the Bracknell Pirates and notching the franchise its first winning season and Play-Off appearances. In 1987 the Bracknell Tigers joined the BBL and won the first silverware in 1988–89 before becoming the Thames Valley Tigers. For many years, the Tigers were one of the front runners of the league, even winning the League Championship in 1994, but it was in the new millennium that the successes dried up and for owner John Nike the team was too much of a financial burden. In April 2005, he announced that he would no longer be funding the basketball franchise nor his ice hockey franchise Bracknell Bees.

Immediately a consortium of fans was formed to save the club, headed by local businessman and fan Mike Davies, and they put together a viable package to take over the administration of the team. However, Nike failed to reach agreement in time for them to lease the franchise, and the deadline for entry into the BBL for 2005–06 was reached. The Tigers' BBL membership thus lapsed, but the fans obtained permission from the League to enter a new team in their place, and successful negotiations with the Spectrum Arena in Guildford, where the Pirates franchise started, led to the birth of the brand new Guildford Heat.

== Honours ==
(All achieved as Thames Valley Tigers unless otherwise stated):

Senior Men

- BBL League Champions: 1993–94
  - Runner Up: 1991–92, 1992–93, 1994–95, 1999–00 (South)
- BBL Play-offs Runner Up: 1991–92, 1992–93, 1997–98, 1998–99
- National Cup Winners: 1988–89 (as Bracknell Tigers) 1997–98
  - Runner Up: 1991–92, 1993–94, 1994–95
- BBL National Trophy Winners: 1988–89 (as Bracknell Tigers), 1992–93, 1993–94, 1994–95
- English National League Division 2 Champions: 1978–79 (as Guildford Pirates)

Junior (Under-18) Men

- National Cup Winners: 1981–82 (as Team Talbot Guildford Pirates)
- National Under-18 League Play-offs Runner Up: 1981–82 (as Team Talbot Guildford Pirates)

Individual Honours

- Mick Bett - BBL Coach of the Year: 1992–93 and 1993–94
- Nigel Lloyd - BBL MVP: 1993–94

== Season by season ==
Season	League	Played	Won	Lost	%	Position	Play-offs	Cup	Trophy
TEAM TALBOT GUILDFORD PIRATES
1979–80	NBL Div1	18	2	16	.111	10th (10)	DNQ	R1	
1980–81	NBL Div1	18	3	15	.167	10th (10)	DNQ	Q-Final	
1981–82	NBL Div1	22	6	16	.273	10th (12)	DNQ	R2	
BRACKNELL PIRATES (aka HAPPY EATER BRACKNELL PIRATES)
1982–83	NBL Div1	24	3	21	.125	12th (13)	DNQ	R1	
1983–84	NBL Div1	36	23	13	.639	4th (13)	S-Final	R2	
1984–85	NBL Div1	26	12	14	.462	8th (14)	Q-Final	R1	
1985–86	NBL Div1	28	11	17	.393	12th (15)	DNQ	R2	
1986–87	NBL Div1	24	11	13	.458	6th (13)	Q-Final	Q-Final	
BRACKNELL TIGERS
1987–88	BBL	28	17	11	.607	6th (15)	Q-Final	R2	(group)
1988–89	BBL	20	15	5	.750	3rd (11)	S-Final	Winner	Winner
1989–90	BBL	28	20	8	.714	4th (8)	S-Final	S-Final	S-Final
THAMES VALLEY TIGERS
1990–91	BBL	24	14	10	.583	3rd (9)	S-Final	S-Final	S-Final
1991–92	BBL	30	25	5	.833	2nd (11)	Finalist	Finalist	(group)
1992–93	BBL	33	28	5	.848	2nd (11)	Finalist	S-Final	Winner
1993–94	BBL	36	31	5	.861	1st (13)	Q-Final	Finalist	Winner
1994–95	BBL	36	28	8	.777	2nd (15)	Q-Final	Finalist	Winner
1995–96	BBL	36	16	20	.444	8th (13)	Q-Final	Q-Final	Q-Final
1996–97	BBL	36	14	22	.388	10th (13)	DNQ	Q-Final	Q-Final
1997–98	BBL	36	24	12	.667	5th (13)	Finalist	Winner	Q-Final
1998–99	BBL	36	22	14	.611	4th (13)	Finalist	S-Final	(group)
1999–00	BBL South	34	18	16	.529	2nd (6)	Q-Final	Last 16	S-Final
2000–01	BBL South	34	14	20	.412	5th (6)	DNQ	S-Final	S-Final
2001–02	BBL South	32	14	18	.438	6th (6)	DNQ	S-Final	Q-Final
2002–03	BBL	40	26	14	.650	4th (11)	Q-Final	S-Final	(group)
2003–04	BBL	36	18	18	.500	7th (10)	Q-Final	S-Final	(group)
2004–05	BBL	40	16	22	.400	7th (11)	Q-Final	Q-Final	(group)

== See also ==
- Bracknell Bees
- British Basketball League
- Guildford Heat
