= 1996–97 British Basketball League season =

1996–97 BBL season
- League: British Basketball League
- Sport: Basketball

Roll of Honour
- BBL champions: Leopards
- Play Off's champions: London Towers
- National Cup champions: Leopards
- BBL Trophy champions: London Towers

British Basketball League seasons
- ← 1995–96 1997–98 →

The 1996–97 BBL season was known as the Budweiser League for sponsorship reasons. The league retained a total of 13 teams, playing 36 games each. The main change featured the return of Crystal Palace after several seasons of rejected applications. Palace replaced Doncaster Panthers following the liquidation of the South Yorkshire club.

The League's two London-based teams dominated throughout the season, with the Leopards team claiming their first silverware in its franchise history after winning the Budweiser League and Sainsbury's Classic Cola Cup double. Their Capital foes, London Towers were equally successful throughout the campaign, clinching the 7 Up Trophy and pipping Leopards to the play-off title, with a one-point victory in the final at Wembley Arena against their rivals.

== Budweiser League Championship (Tier 1) ==
=== Final standings ===
Pos	Team	Pld	W	L	%	Pts
1	Leopards	36	28	8	0.778	56
2	London Towers	36	26	10	0.722	52
3	Sheffield Sharks	36	26	10	0.722	52
4	Birmingham Bullets	36	26	10	0.722	52
5	Chester Jets	36	24	12	0.667	48
6	Manchester Giants	36	22	14	0.611	44
7	Newcastle Eagles	36	21	15	0.583	42
8	Leicester Riders	36	15	21	0.416	30
9	Derby Storm	36	14	22	0.389	28
10	Thames Valley Tigers	36	14	22	0.389	28
11	Worthing Bears	36	12	24	0.333	24
12	Crystal Palace	36	5	31	0.138	10
13	Hemel & Watford Royals	36	2	34	0.055	4

= League winners
= Qualified for the play-offs

=== Playoffs ===
==== Quarter-finals ====
(1) Leopards vs. (8) Leicester Riders

12 April 1997

Leicester Riders	122–130	Leopards

13 April 1997

Leopards	114–105	Leicester Riders
Leopards wins series, 2–0

(2) London Towers vs. (7) Newcastle Eagles

11 April 1997

Newcastle Eagles	79–91	London Towers

15 April 1997

London Towers	70–80	Newcastle Eagles

20 April 1997

London Towers	96–80	Newcastle Eagles
London wins series, 2–1

(3) Sheffield Sharks vs. (6) Manchester Giants

13 April 1997

Manchester Giants	72–77	Sheffield Sharks

15 April 1997

Sheffield Sharks	74–68	Manchester Giants
Sheffield wins series, 2–0

(4) Birmingham Bullets vs. (5) Chester Jets

13 April 1997

Chester Jets	86–78	Birmingham Bullets

16 April 1997

Birmingham Bullets	82–72	Chester Jets

18 April 1997

Birmingham Bullets	78–81	Chester Jets
Chester wins series, 2–1

==== Semi-finals ====
3 May 1997

Leopards	102–101	Chester Jets

Wembley Arena, London

3 May 1997

London Towers	80–72	Sheffield Sharks

Wembley Arena, London

==== Final ====
4 May 1997

Report

London Towers	89–88	Leopards
Pts: Keith Robinson (MVP) 25, Danny Lewis 22, Neville Austin 11, Roger Duhaney, Tony Windless, Alan Cunningham, Paul Deppisch, Karl Brown		Pts: Eric Burks 22, Ronnie Baker 20, Tim Davis 16, Robert Youngblood, John Tresvant, John White

Wembley Arena, London
Attendance: ?
Towers coach Kevin Cadle
Leopards coach Billy Mims

== National League Division 1 (Tier 2) ==
=== Final standings ===
Pos	Team	Pld	W	L	%	Pts
1	Ware Rebels	26	21	5	0.808	47
2	Plymouth Raiders	26	20	6	0.769	46
3	Coventry Crusaders	26	18	8	0.693	44
4	Guildford Swifts	26	18	8	0.693	44
5	Oxford Devils	26	16	10	0.615	42
6	Westminster Warriors	26	15	11	0.578	41
7	Stockton Mohawks	26	14	12	0.538	40
8	Cardiff Phoenix	26	14	12	0.538	40
9	Nottingham Knights	26	12	14	0.462	37
10	Bury & Bolton Wildcats	26	11	15	0.423	36
11	Mid-Sussex Magic	26	10	16	0.385	36
12	Brixton TopCats	26	7	19	0.269	33
13	Liverpool Atac	26	6	20	0.231	32
14	Solent Stars	26	0	26	0.000	26

= League winners
= Qualified for the play-offs

=== Playoffs ===
Semi-finals

19 April 1997

Plymouth Raiders	56–48	Coventry Crusaders

20 April 1997

Ware Rebels	83–77	Oxford Devils

Final

4 May 1997

Ware Rebels	106–118	Plymouth Raiders

Wembley Arena

== National League Division 2 (Tier 3) ==
=== Final standings ===
Pos	Team	Pld	W	L	%	Pts
1	Solihull Chiefs	26	25	1	0.962	51
2	London Towers II	26	22	4	0.846	48
3	Thames Valley Tigers II	26	20	6	0.769	46
4	South Wales SS	26	17	9	0.654	43
5	South Bank Leopards	26	15	11	0.578	41
6	Derby Storm II	26	15	11	0.578	41
7	Slough Chargers	26	14	12	0.538	40
8	Northampton 89ers	26	11	15	0.423	37
9	Aston Adante	26	9	17	0.346	35
10	Swindon Sonics	26	8	18	0.308	34
11	Flintshire Flyers	26	7	19	0.269	33
12	Chessington Wildcats	26	7	19	0.269	33
13	Sheffield Forgers	26	6	20	0.231	31
14	Bournemouth Dolphins	26	5	21	0.192	30

= League winners
= Qualified for the play-offs

=== Playoffs ===
Final

Thames Valley Tigers II	91–83	Solihull Chiefs

Wembley Arena

== Sainsbury's Classic Cola National Cup ==
=== Fourth round ===
Team 1	Team 2	Score
Manchester Giants	Crystal Palace	91-61
Coventry Crusaders	Sheffield Sharks	56-86
Birmingham Bullets	Hemel & Watford Royals	91-84
Cardiff Phoenix	London Towers	55-95
Ware Rebels	Newcastle Eagles	70-102
Thames Valley Tigers	Derby Storm	80-79
Worthing Bears	Leicester Riders	74-84
Chester Jets	Leopards	103-112

=== Quarter-finals ===
Team 1	Team 2	Score
Sheffield Sharks	Leicester Riders	103-98
London Towers	Manchester Giants	83-74
Newcastle Eagles	Birmingham Bullets	99-93
Thames Valley Tigers	Leopards	87-102

=== Semi-finals ===
Team 1	Team 2	1st Leg	2nd Leg
Sheffield Sharks	Newcastle Eagles	91-80	75-84
Leopards	London Towers	93-92	72-70

=== Final ===
19 January 1997

Leopards	87–79	Sheffield Sharks
Pts: Eric Burks (MVP) 28, John White 28, Robert Youngblood 16, John Tresvant, Tim Davis, Ronnie Baker		Pts: Roger Huggins 26, Voise Winters 19, Todd Cauthorn, Deon Hames, Isaac Morgan, Ian McKinney, Jason Swaine, Chris Finch

Sheffield Arena
Attendance: ?
Leopards coach Billy Mims
Sheffield coach Jim Brandon

== 7 Up Trophy ==
=== Group stage ===
Northern Group

Team	Pts	Pld	W	L	Percent
1.Sheffield Sharks	10	5	5	0	1.000
2.Chester Jets	8	5	4	1	0.800
3.Leicester Riders	4	5	2	3	0.400
4.Manchester Giants	4	5	2	3	0.400
5.Derby Storm	2	5	1	4	0.200
6.Newcastle Eagles	2	5	1	4	0.200

Southern Group

Team	Pts	Pld	W	L	Percent
1.Leopards	10	5	5	0	1.000
2.Thames Valley Tigers	6	5	3	2	0.600
3.Worthing Bears	6	5	3	2	0.600
4.Birmingham Bullets	6	5	3	2	0.600
5.Crystal Palace	2	5	1	4	0.400
6.Hemel & Watford Royals	0	5	0	5	0.000

Leicester finished ahead of Manchester by having the best head-to-head record between the teams, whilst Birmingham qualify as fourth-placed finishers with the best record. London received a bye into Quarter-finals.

=== Quarter-finals ===
Birmingham Bullets vs. Leicester Riders

Birmingham Bullets	77–95	Leicester Riders

Leicester Riders	69–79	Birmingham Bullets
Leicester win on aggregate, 164–156

Leopards vs. London Towers

Leopards	79–111	London Towers

London Towers	92–90	Leopards
London win on aggregate, 203–169

Thames Valley Tigers vs. Chester Jets

Thames Valley Tigers	85–91	Chester Jets

Chester Jets	89–89	Thames Valley Tigers
Chester win on aggregate, 180–174

Worthing Bears vs. Sheffield Sharks

Worthing Bears	81–83	Sheffield Sharks

Sheffield Sharks	97–85	Worthing Bears
Sheffield win on aggregate, 180–166

=== Semi-finals ===
Chester Jets vs. Leicester Riders

Chester Jets	92–88	Leicester Riders

Leicester Riders	92–93	Chester Jets
Chester win on aggregate, 185–180

Sheffield Sharks vs. London Towers

Sheffield Sharks	75–74	London Towers

London Towers	80–71	Sheffield Sharks
London win on aggregate, 154–146

=== Final ===
2 March 1997

London Towers	67–59	Chester Jets
Pts: Karl Brown (MVP) 16, Neville Austin 14, Danny Lewis 13, Tony Windless 11, Keith Robinson, Alan Cunningham, Paul Deppisch		Pts: Hillary Scott 16, Billy Singleton 15, Ricardo Leonard 11, Russ Saunders 10, Nigel Palmer, Mark Ogley

National Exhibition Centre, Birmingham
Attendance: ?
Towers coach Kevin Cadle
Chester coach Mike Burton

== Seasonal awards ==
- Most Valuable Player: John White (Leopards)
- Coach of the Year: Mike Burton (Chester Jets)
- All-Star Team:
  - John White (Leopards)
  - Ralph Blalock (Newcastle Eagles)
  - Eric Burks (Leopards)
  - Tony Dorsey (Birmingham Bullets)
  - James Hamilton (Worthing Bears)
  - Roger Huggins (Sheffield Sharks)
  - Danny Lewis (London Towers)
  - Nigel Lloyd (Birmingham Bullets)
  - Billy Singleton (Chester Jets)
  - Voise Winters (Sheffield Sharks)

Preceded by 1995–96 season	BBL seasons 1996–97	Succeeded by 1997–98 season
