= 1995–96 British Basketball League season =

1995–96 BBL season
- League: British Basketball League
- Sport: Basketball

Roll of Honour
- BBL champions: London Towers
- Playoffs champions: Birmingham Bullets
- National Cup champions: London Towers
- BBL Trophy champions: London Towers

British Basketball League seasons
- 1994–95 1996–97

The 1995–96 BBL season was known as the Budweiser League for sponsorship reasons. The league featured a total of 13 teams, playing 36 games each. The division retained the same thirteen teams as the previous year after the BBL rejected an application from Crystal Palace who had sealed the National League Division One (the second tier) title. The main change saw the Sunderland Scorpions renamed the Newcastle Comets due to a change of franchise and venue, their new home would be in Gateshead until the newly built Newcastle Arena opened on 18 November. The Manchester Giants also had a new home at the Nynex Arena and the sport was boosted by the return of TV coverage by Sky Sports.

London Towers clinched a treble, winning the National Cup, 7 Up Trophy and finishing top of the regular season standings. They were defeated in the Championship Play-off final by Birmingham Bullets.

== Budweiser League Championship (Tier 1) ==
=== Final standings ===
Pos	Team	Pld	W	L	%	Pts
1	London Towers	36	32	4	0.889	64
2	Sheffield Sharks	36	30	6	0.833	60
3	Birmingham Bullets	36	26	10	0.722	52
4	Leopards	36	23	13	0.638	46
5	Manchester Giants	36	21	15	0.583	42
6	Derby Storm	36	21	15	0.583	42
7	Worthing Bears	36	19	17	0.527	38
8	Thames Valley Tigers	36	16	20	0.444	32
9	Newcastle Comets	36	11	25	0.305	22
10	Leicester City Riders	36	11	25	0.305	22
11	Doncaster Panthers	36	10	26	0.278	20
12	Chester Jets	36	8	28	0.222	16
13	Hemel Royals	36	6	30	0.167	12

= League winners
= Qualified for the play-offs

=== Playoffs ===
==== Quarter-finals ====
(1) London Towers vs. (8) Thames Valley Tigers

Thames Valley Tigers	87–118	London Towers

London Towers	94–81	Thames Valley Tigers
London win series, 2–0

(2) Sheffield Sharks vs. (7) Worthing Bears

Worthing Bears	75–78	Sheffield Sharks

Sheffield Sharks	79–60	Worthing Bears
Sheffield win series, 2–0

(3) Birmingham Bullets vs. (6) Derby Storm

Derby Storm	78–92	Birmingham Bullets

Birmingham Bullets	96–88	Derby Storm
Birmingham win series, 2–0

(4) Leopards vs. (5) Manchester Giants

Manchester Giants	72–76 (OT)	Leopards

Leopards	74–83	Manchester Giants

Leopards	73–75	Manchester Giants
Manchester win series, 2–1

==== Semi-finals ====
London Towers	95–86	Manchester Giants

Wembley Arena, London

Sheffield Sharks	68–82	Birmingham Bullets

Wembley Arena, London

==== Final ====
Sky Sports 1

5 May 1996
19:00

Birmingham Bullets	78–72	London Towers
Scoring by quarter: –, 43–45, 17–15, 18–12
Pts: Nigel Lloyd 23, Dorsey 22, Gordon 12; MVP: Tony Dorsey		Pts: Windless 19, Bucknall/Lewis 13

Wembley Arena, London
Attendance: ?
Birmingham Coach Nick Nurse
London Coach Kevin Cadle

== National League Division 1 (Tier 2) ==
=== Final standings ===
Pos	Team	Pld	W	L	%	Pts
1	Crystal Palace	22	22	0	1.000	44
2	Coventry Crusaders	22	19	3	0.864	38
3	Ware Rebels *	22	17	5	0.773	33
4	Cardiff Phoenix	22	14	8	0.636	28
5	Bury Wildcats	22	10	12	0.455	20
6	Stockton Mohawks	22	10	12	0.455	20
7	Brixton TopCats	22	9	13	0.409	18
8	Mid-Sussex Magic	22	9	13	0.409	18
9	Nottingham Knights	22	7	15	0.318	14
10	Plymouth Raiders	22	7	15	0.318	14
11	Oldham Celtics	22	5	17	0.227	10
12	Solent Stars	22	3	19	0.136	6

= League winners

One point deducted *

== Sainsbury's Classic Cola National Cup ==
=== Fourth round ===
Team 1	Team 2	Score
Derby Bucks	London Towers	65-82
Hemel Hempstead Royals	Coventry Crusaders	101-73
Sheffield Sharks	Chester Jets	71-40
Worthing Bears	Leopards	82-87
Newcastle Comets	Manchester Eagles	107-121
Ware Rebels	Thames Valley Tigers	71-103
Crystal Palace	Doncaster Panthers	82-81
Birmingham Bullets	Leicester Riders	94-72

=== Quarter-finals ===
Team 1	Team 2	Score
Thames Valley Tigers	London Towers	
Crystal Palace	Leopards	80-75
Sheffield Sharks	Manchester Eagles	
Hemel Royals	Birmingham Bullets	72-84

=== Semi-finals ===
Team 1	Team 2	1st Leg	2nd Leg
Crystal Palace	Sheffield Sharks	63-70	68-74
Birmingham Bullets	London Towers	79-77	77-99

=== Final ===
3 March 1996

London Towers	70–58	Sheffield Sharks
Pts: Martin Henlan (MVP), Neville Austin, Roger Dulhaney, Tony Windless, Danny Lewis, Steve Bucknall		Pts: Roger Huggins, Todd Cauthorn

Sheffield Arena
Attendance: ?
London Coach Kevin Cadle
Sheffield Coach Jim Brandon

== 7 Up Trophy ==
=== Group stage ===
Northern Group

Team	Pts	Pld	W	L	Percent
1.Derby Storm	8	4	4	0	1.000
2.Chester Jets	4	4	2	2	0.500
3.Doncaster Panthers	4	4	2	2	0.500
4.Leicester City Riders	2	4	1	3	0.250
5.Newcastle Comets	2	4	1	3	0.250

Southern Group

Team	Pts	Pld	W	L	Percent
1.Worthing Bears	6	3	3	0	1.000
2.Birmingham Bullets	4	3	2	1	0.667
3.Leopards	2	3	1	2	0.333
4.Hemel Royals	0	3	0	3	0.000

Chester finished ahead of Doncaster by having the best head-to-head record between the teams. London, Manchester, Sheffield and Thames Valley all received a bye into Quarter-finals.

=== Quarter-finals ===
Chester Jets vs. Birmingham Bullets

Chester Jets	89–108	Birmingham Bullets

Birmingham Bullets	92–89	Chester Jets
Birmingham win on aggregate, 200–178

Manchester Giants vs. Sheffield Sharks

Manchester Giants	78–81	Sheffield Sharks

Sheffield Sharks	77–66	Manchester Giants
Sheffield win on aggregate, 158–144

Thames Valley Tigers vs. London Towers

Thames Valley Tigers	82–89	London Towers

London Towers	85–66	Thames Valley Tigers
London win on aggregate, 174–148

Worthing Bears vs. Derby Storm

Worthing Bears	86–88	Derby Storm

Derby Storm	93–99	Worthing Bears
Worthing win on aggregate, 185–181

=== Semi-finals ===
London Towers vs. Birmingham Bullets

London Towers	64–62	Birmingham Bullets

Birmingham Bullets	75–92	London Towers
London win on aggregate, 156–137

Worthing Bears vs. Sheffield Sharks

Worthing Bears	86–87	Sheffield Sharks

Sheffield Sharks	69–72	Worthing Bears
Worthing win on aggregate, 158–156

=== Final ===
13 January 1996

London Towers	90–84	Worthing Bears
Pts: Tony Windless (MVP), Steve Bucknall, Danny Lewis, Martin Henlan, Roger Duhaney		Pts: Colin Irish

National Exhibition Centre, Birmingham
Attendance: ?
London Coach Kevin Cadle
Worthing Coach Colin Irish

== Seasonal awards ==
- Most Valuable Player: Tony Dorsey (Birmingham Bullets)
- Coach of the Year: Kevin Cadle (London Towers)
- All-Star Team:
  - Tony Dorsey (Birmingham Bullets)
  - Karl Brown (Leopards)
  - Steve Bucknall (London Towers)
  - Todd Cauthorn (Sheffield Sharks)
  - Roger Huggins (Sheffield Sharks)
  - LaKeith Humphrey (Derby Storm)
  - Colin Irish (Worthing Bears)
  - Danny Lewis (London Towers)
  - Mark Robinson (Manchester Giants)
  - Tony Windless (London Towers)

Preceded by 1994–95 season	BBL seasons 1995–96	Succeeded by 1996–97 season
