= 1997–98 British Basketball League season =

1997–98 BBL season
- League: British Basketball League
- Sport: Basketball

Roll of Honour
- BBL champions: Greater London Leopards
- Play Off's champions: Birmingham Bullets
- National Cup champions: Thames Valley Tigers
- BBL Trophy champions: Sheffield Sharks

British Basketball League seasons
- 1996–97 1998–99

The 1997–98 BBL season was known as the Budweiser League for sponsorship reasons. The league featured the same 13 teams as the previous year, playing 36 games each. The only change saw the Hemel Royals renamed the Watford Royals.

Greater London Leopards clinched their second successive Budweiser League title only by virtue of an overtime win in their final game of the season against Sheffield Sharks. Leopards' 102–106 victory in Sheffield meant they finished level on points with title-rivals Birmingham Bullets, but were crowned Champions due to a better head-to-head record over the Midlands team. Birmingham gained some consolation by taking their second Play-off Championship in three years at Wembley Arena, beating off a tough challenge from Thames Valley Tigers, winning 78–75. The Thames Valley Tigers won the National Cup and the Sheffield claimed their first uni-ball Trophy with an 82–79 win over London Towers at the National Exhibition Centre.

London Towers represented the Budweiser League in European competition, participating in the EuroCup.

== Notable occurrences ==
- Greater London Leopards won the League title in the final game of the season on April 5, 1998, with a 102–106 overtime victory at Sheffield Sharks. Regulation time ended on 90–90, but Leopards' Eric Burks sunk 9 of their 16 overtime points to win the title for the second successive season.

== Budweiser League Championship (Tier 1) ==
=== Final standings ===
Pos	Team	Pld	W	L	%	Pts
1	Greater London Leopards	36	29	7	0.806	58
2	Birmingham Bullets	36	29	7	0.806	58
3	Newcastle Eagles	36	25	11	0.694	50
4	Sheffield Sharks	36	25	11	0.694	50
5	Thames Valley Tigers	36	24	12	0.667	48
6	London Towers	36	23	13	0.638	46
7	Derby Storm	36	16	20	0.444	32
8	Manchester Giants	36	15	21	0.416	30
9	Leicester Riders	36	15	21	0.416	30
10	Chester Jets	36	15	21	0.416	30
11	Crystal Palace	36	8	28	0.222	16
12	Worthing Bears	36	7	29	0.194	14
13	Watford Royals	36	3	33	0.083	6

= League winners
= Qualified for the play-offs

=== Playoffs ===
==== Quarter-finals ====
(1) Greater London Leopards vs. (8) Manchester Giants

April 14, 1998

Manchester Giants	86–93	Greater London Leopards

April 16, 1998

Greater London Leopards	98–107	Manchester Giants

April 19, 1998

Greater London Leopards	81–90	Manchester Giants
Manchester wins series, 2–1

(2) Birmingham Bullets vs. (7) Derby Storm

April 11, 1998

Derby Storm	79–111	Birmingham Bullets

April 14, 1998

Birmingham Bullets	84–86 (OT)	Derby Storm

April 19, 1998

Birmingham Bullets	96–81	Derby Storm
Birmingham wins series, 2–1

(3) Newcastle Eagles vs. (6) London Towers

April 12, 1998

London Towers	68–63	Newcastle Eagles

April 14, 1998

Newcastle Eagles	73–50	London Towers

April 19, 1998

Newcastle Eagles	85–87	London Towers
London wins series, 2–1

(4) Sheffield Sharks vs. (5) Thames Valley Tigers

April 11, 1998

Thames Valley Tigers	84–83	Sheffield Sharks

April 14, 1998

Sheffield Sharks	75–97	Thames Valley Tigers
Thames Valley wins series, 2–0

==== Semi-finals ====
May 2, 1998

Birmingham Bullets	90–80	Manchester Giants

Wembley Arena, London

May 2, 1998

Thames Valley Tigers	78–71	London Towers

Wembley Arena, London

==== Third-place game ====
May 3, 1998

Manchester Giants	87–82	London Towers

Wembley Arena, London

==== Final ====
May 3, 1998

Report

Birmingham Bullets	78–75	Thames Valley Tigers
Pts: Tony Dorsey (MVP) 28, Reggie Kirk 18, Nigel Lloyd 16, HL Coleman, Fab Flournoy; Rebs: Lloyd 9		Pts: John McCord 24, Dameon Page 19, Tony Holley 13, Casey Arena, Jason Siemon, Adrian Cummings; Rebs: Holley 13

Wembley Arena, London
Attendance: ?
Bullets coach Mike Finger
Tigers coach Paul James

== National League Division 1 (Tier 2) ==
=== Final standings ===
Pos	Team	Pld	W	L	%	Pts
1	Richmond Jaguars	22	20	2	0.958	40
2	Plymouth Raiders	22	19	3	0.864	38
3	Stevenage Rebels	22	16	6	0.727	32
4	Teesside Mohawks	22	14	8	0.636	28
5	Solihull Chiefs	22	13	9	0.592	26
6	Coventry Crusaders	22	13	9	0.592	26
7	Guildford Pumas	22	10	12	0.455	20
8	Oxford Devils	22	9	13	0.409	18
9	Westminster Warriors	22	6	16	0.273	12
10	Cardiff Phoenix	22	4	18	0.182	8
11	Mid-Sussex Magic	22	4	18	0.182	8
12	Brixton TopCats	22	4	18	0.182	8

= League winners
= Qualified for the play-offs

=== Playoffs ===
Semi-finals

Richmond Jaguars	208–195 (agg.)	Teesside Mohawks

Plymouth Raiders	164–146 (agg.)	Stevenage Rebels

Final

Richmond Jaguars	82–67	Plymouth Raiders

== National League Division 2 (Tier 3) ==
=== Final standings ===
Pos	Team	Pld	W	L	%	Pts
1	Solent Stars	24	23	1	0.962	46
2	Cardiff Clippers	24	20	4	0.833	40
3	London Towers II	24	19	5	0.793	38
4	South Bank University Bulls	24	14	10	0.583	28
5	Bournemouth Dolphins	24	14	10	0.583	28
6	Wolverhampton	24	12	12	0.500	24
7	Flintshire Flyers	24	11	13	0.458	22
8	Northampton 89ers	24	10	14	0.417	20
9	Slough Chargers	24	9	15	0.375	18
10	Liverpool Atac	24	9	15	0.375	18
11	Swindon Sonics	24	9	15	0.375	18
12	Chessington Wildcats	24	5	19	0.208	10
13	Thames Valley Tigers II	24	1	23	0.042	2

= League winners
= Qualified for the play-offs

=== Playoffs ===
Semi-finals

Cardiff Clippers	171–175 (agg.)	London Towers II

Solent Stars	202–185 (agg.)	South Bank University Bulls

Final

9 May 1998

Solent Stars	70–68	London Towers II

NYNEX Arena

== Sainsbury's Classic Cola National Cup ==
=== Fourth round ===
Team 1	Team 2	Score
Worthing Bears	Crystal Palace	106-102
Coventry Crusaders	Thames Valley Tigers	67-91
Stevenage Rebels	Manchester Giants	60-93
Leicester Riders	Newcastle Eagles	94-76
Leopards	Derby Storm	99-90
Sheffield Sharks	Watford Royals	85-70
Plymouth Raiders	London Towers	77-99
Chester Jets	Birmingham Bullets	

=== Quarter-finals ===
Team 1	Team 2	Score
Sheffield Sharks	Leicester Riders	66-69
London Towers	Manchester Giants	75-67
Birmingham Bullets	Worthing Bears	111-80
Thames Valley Tigers	Leopards	97-89

=== Semi-finals ===
Team 1	Team 2	1st Leg	2nd Leg
Thames Valley Tigers	Birmingham Bullets	63-55	63-70
London Towers	Leicester Riders	76-74	84-90

=== Final ===
17 January 1998

Thames Valley Tigers	82–78	Leicester Riders
Pts: John McCord 27, Dameon Page 18, Casey Arena 14, Jason Siemon 14, Tony Holley		Pts: Billy Singleton 24, Gene Waldron 21, JaRon Boone 12, James Havrilla, Geno Ford

Sheffield Arena
Attendance: ?
Tigers coach Paul James
Riders coach Bob Donewald

== uni-ball Trophy ==
=== Group stage ===
Northern Group

Team	Pts	Pld	W	L	Percent
1.Newcastle Eagles	6	5	3	2	0.600
2.Leicester Riders	6	5	3	2	0.600
3.Manchester Giants	6	5	3	2	0.600
4.Sheffield Sharks	4	5	2	3	0.400
5.Chester Jets	4	5	2	3	0.400
6.Derby Storm	4	5	2	3	0.400

Southern Group

Team	Pts	Pld	W	L	Percent
1.Gtr. London Leopards	10	5	5	0	1.000
2.Thames Valley Tigers	6	5	3	2	0.600
3.Birmingham Bullets	6	5	3	2	0.600
4.Watford Royals	4	5	2	3	0.400
5.Crystal Palace	4	5	2	3	0.400
6.Worthing Bears	0	5	0	5	0.000

Sheffield finished ahead of Chester and Derby by having the best record in matches between the three teams and qualify as fourth-placed finishers with the best record ahead of Watford on basket difference. London Towers received a bye into Quarter-finals.

=== Quarter-finals ===
Greater London Leopards vs. Thames Valley Tigers

January 14, 1998

Greater London Leopards	83–79	Thames Valley Tigers

January 21, 1998

Thames Valley Tigers	87–95	Greater London Leopards
Greater London wins on aggregate, 178–166

London Towers vs. Manchester Giants

January 14, 1998

London Towers	90–69	Manchester Giants

January 21, 1998

Manchester Giants	69–69	London Towers
London wins on aggregate, 159–138

Newcastle Eagles vs. Birmingham Bullets

January 13, 1998

Newcastle Eagles	70–66	Birmingham Bullets

January 24, 1998

Birmingham Bullets	86–95	Newcastle Eagles
Newcastle wins on aggregate, 165–152

Sheffield Sharks vs. Leicester Riders

January 13, 1998

Sheffield Sharks	97–94	Leicester Riders

January 21, 1998

Leicester Riders	83–99	Sheffield Sharks
Sheffield wins on aggregate, 196–177

=== Semi-finals ===
London Towers vs. Newcastle Eagles

February 3, 1998

London Towers	92–74	Newcastle Eagles

February 13, 1998

Newcastle Eagles	89–89	London Towers
London wins on aggregate, 181–163

Sheffield Sharks vs. Greater London Leopards

February 4, 1998

Sheffield Sharks	103–85	Greater London Leopards

February 12, 1998

Greater London Leopards	90–82	Sheffield Sharks
Sheffield wins on aggregate, 185–175

=== Final ===
March 8, 1998

Report

Sheffield Sharks	82–79	London Towers
Pts: John Amaechi (MVP) 40, Terrell Myers, Mark Robinson, Wilbur Johnson; Rebs: John Amaechi, 16		Pts: Danny Lewis 23, Keith Robinson, James Hamilton, Neville Austin, Marco Baldi, Tamir Berkovitch; Rebs: Keith Robinson, 13

National Exhibition Centre, Birmingham
Attendance: ?
Sharks coach Chris Finch
Towers coach Kevin Cadle

== Dairylea Dunkers All-Star Game ==
March 22, 1998
7.05pm GMT

Report

Northern All-Stars	168–175	Southern All-Stars
Pts: Leon McGee, 25		Pts: John White, 32

Sheffield Arena, Sheffield

Northern All-Stars
Player	Team
(United Kingdom) John Amaechi	Sheffield Sharks
(United States) Billy Singleton	Leicester Riders
(United States) Robert Churchwell	Manchester Giants
(United States) JaRon Boone	Leicester Riders
(United States) Corey Jackson	Chester Jets
(United States) Ted Berry	Derby Storm
(United States) Mark Robinson	Sheffield Sharks
(United States) Leon McGee	Newcastle Eagles
(United States) Rob Phelps	Newcastle Eagles
(United States) Mark Boyd	Newcastle Eagles
(United States) Todd Cauthorn	Sheffield Sharks
(United States) (Croatia) James Havrilla	Leicester Riders
Coach
(United States) Craig Lynch	Newcastle Eagles

Southern All-Stars
Player	Team
(United States) Tony Dorsey	Birmingham Bullets
(United States) Eric Burks	Greater London Leopards
(United States) John White	Greater London Leopards
(United States) John McCord	Thames Valley Tigers
(United States) Tony Holley	Thames Valley Tigers
(United States) Brad Wedel	Crystal Palace
(United States) Danny Lewis	London Towers
(Canada) Greg Francis	Worthing Bears
(Barbados) Nigel Lloyd	Birmingham Bullets
(United States) Keith Robinson	London Towers
(United States) Robert Youngblood	Greater London Leopards
(United Kingdom) Alan Hopper	Watford Royals
Coach
(United States) Billy Mims	Greater London Leopards

== Statistics leaders ==
Category	Player	Stat
Points per game	(United States) Tony Dorsey (Birmingham Bullets)	26.09
Rebounds per game	(United States) Makeba Perry (Greater London Leopards)	11.81
Assists per game	(Jamaica) Cleave Lewis (Watford Royals)	5.78
Steals per game	(United States) Casey Arena (Thames Valley Tigers)	3.11
Blocks per game	(Canada) Brendan Graves (Derby Storm)	2.77

== Seasonal awards ==
- Most Valuable Player: Eric Burks (Greater London Leopards)
- Coach of the Year: Billy Mimms (Greater London Leopards)
- All-Star Team:
  - Eric Burks (Greater London Leopards)
  - John Amaechi (Sheffield Sharks)
  - Ted Berry (Derby Storm)
  - Tony Dorsey (Birmingham Bullets)
  - Tony Holley (Thames Valley Tigers)
  - Danny Lewis (London Towers)
  - Nigel Lloyd (Birmingham Bullets)
  - John McCord (Thames Valley Tigers)
  - Leon McGee (Newcastle Eagles)
  - John White (Greater London Leopards)

Preceded by 1996–97 season	BBL seasons 1997–98	Succeeded by 1998–99 season
