= 1999–2000 British Basketball League season =

1999–2000 BBL season
- League: British Basketball League
- Sport: Basketball

Roll of Honour
- BBL champions: N Manchester Giants; S London Towers
- Play Off's champions: Manchester Giants
- National Cup champions: Sheffield Sharks
- BBL Trophy champions: London Towers

British Basketball League seasons
- ← 1998–99 2000–01 →

The 1999–2000 BBL season, was known as the Dairylea Dunkers Championship for sponsorship reasons, the regular season commenced on September 15, 1999, and ended on April 8, 2000, with a total of 13 teams competing. For the first time in the league’s history, the 13 teams were split into two geographically divided Conferences, seven in the North and six in the South, with northern teams playing 36 games and southern teams playing 34 games each. The season was dominated by the success of Manchester Giants, conquering the Northern Conference and Championship Play-offs, whilst London Towers were victorious in the Southern Conference and the uni-ball Trophy. Sheffield Sharks were also successful in defending their Sainsbury's Classic Cola National Cup.

London Towers featured in European competition, participating in the Saporta Cup, though with a 3-7 record they finished at the bottom of Group G and thus failed to progress beyond the Group stage. Cross-town rivals Greater London Leopards also made a brief appearance in the Korać Cup but following a 155-189 aggregate defeat to ÍRB Reykjanesbær in the Preliminary round, their first foray into Europe was merely a cameo.

The Southern All-Stars beat their Northern rivals in the eleventh annual All-Star Game with a 177-180 victory, the closest result in the League's history. That was the 7th overall win of the South against the North who won 5 games since the All-Star Game's inception in 1989.

== Dairylea Dunkers Championship (Tier 1) ==
=== Final standings ===
==== Northern Conference ====
| Pos | Team | Pld | W | L | % | Pts |
|---|---|---|---|---|---|---|
| 1 | Manchester Giants | 36 | 31 | 5 | 0.861 | 62 |
| 2 | Sheffield Sharks | 36 | 29 | 7 | 0.805 | 58 |
| 3 | Edinburgh Rocks | 36 | 19 | 17 | 0.527 | 38 |
| 4 | Chester Jets | 36 | 17 | 19 | 0.472 | 34 |
| 5 | Derby Storm | 36 | 17 | 19 | 0.472 | 34 |
| 6 | Newcastle Eagles | 36 | 10 | 26 | 0.277 | 20 |
| 7 | Leicester Riders | 36 | 10 | 26 | 0.277 | 20 |

==== Southern Conference ====
| Pos | Team | Pld | W | L | % | Pts |
|---|---|---|---|---|---|---|
| 1 | London Towers | 34 | 23 | 11 | 0.676 | 46 |
| 2 | Thames Valley Tigers | 34 | 18 | 16 | 0.529 | 36 |
| 3 | Birmingham Bullets | 34 | 17 | 17 | 0.500 | 34 |
| 4 | Milton Keynes Lions | 34 | 15 | 19 | 0.441 | 30 |
| 5 | Greater London Leopards | 34 | 11 | 23 | 0.323 | 22 |
| 6 | Brighton Bears | 34 | 11 | 23 | 0.323 | 22 |

| = Conference winners |
| = Qualified for the play-offs |

=== Playoffs ===
==== Quarter-finals ====
April 15, 2000

| Manchester Giants | 81–68 | Milton Keynes Lions |

SkyDome Arena, Coventry

April 15, 2000

| London Towers | 85–58 | Chester Jets |

SkyDome Arena, Coventry

April 15, 2000

| Sheffield Sharks | 71–81 | Birmingham Bullets |

SkyDome Arena, Coventry

April 15, 2000

| Thames Valley Tigers | 64–68 | Edinburgh Rocks |

SkyDome Arena, Coventry

==== Semi-finals ====
April 22, 2000

| London Towers | 53–60 | Birmingham Bullets |

SkyDome Arena, Coventry

April 22, 2000

| Manchester Giants | 88–84 | Edinburgh Rocks |

SkyDome Arena, Coventry

==== Final ====
May 6, 2000

Report

| Manchester Giants | 74–65 | Birmingham Bullets |
Scoring by quarter: 18-22, 21-15, 15-17, 20-11
| Pts: Tony Dorsey (MVP) 22, Travis Conlan 19 | | Pts: Emiko Etete 13, Fabulous Flournoy 12, |

Wembley Arena, London
Attendance: 6,000
Giants coach Nick Nurse
Bullets coach Mike Finger

== National League Division 1 (Tier 2) ==
=== Final standings ===
| Pos | Team | Pld | W | L | % | Pts |
|---|---|---|---|---|---|---|
| 1 | Teesside Mohawks | 24 | 22 | 2 | 0.917 | 44 |
| 2 | Worthing Thunder Rebels | 24 | 21 | 3 | 0.875 | 42 |
| 3 | Solent Stars | 24 | 18 | 6 | 0.750 | 36 |
| 4 | Plymouth Raiders | 24 | 16 | 8 | 0.667 | 32 |
| 5 | Sutton Pumas | 24 | 12 | 12 | 0.500 | 24 |
| 6 | Islington White Heat | 24 | 12 | 12 | 0.500 | 24 |
| 7 | Coventry Crusaders | 24 | 11 | 13 | 0.458 | 22 |
| 8 | Taunton Tigers | 24 | 9 | 15 | 0.375 | 18 |
| 9 | Birmingham Bullets II | 24 | 8 | 16 | 0.333 | 16 |
| 10 | Westminster Warriors | 24 | 7 | 17 | 0.292 | 14 |
| 11 | Cardiff Clippers | 24 | 7 | 17 | 0.292 | 14 |
| 12 | Oxford Devils | 24 | 7 | 17 | 0.292 | 14 |
| 13 | Mid-Sussex Magic | 24 | 6 | 18 | 0.250 | 12 |

| = League winners |
| = Qualified for the play-offs |

=== Playoffs ===
Quarter-finals

| Teesside Mohawks | 84–70 | Taunton Tigers |

| Plymouth Raiders | 59–78 | Sutton Pumas |

| Solent Stars | 92–84 | Islington White Heat |

| Worthing Thunder Rebels | 99–92 | Coventry Crusaders |

Semi-finals

| Sutton Pumas | 92–97 | Teesside Mohawks |

| Teesside Mohawks | 93–94 | Sutton Pumas |
Teesside won 190-186 on aggregate

| Solent Stars | 97–79 | Worthing Thunder Rebels |

| Worthing Thunder Rebels | 83–76 | Solent Stars |
Solent won 173-162 on aggregate

Final

| Teesside Mohawks | 80–63 | Solent Stars |

Wembley Arena

== National League Division 2 (Tier 3) ==
=== Final standings ===
| Pos | Team | Pld | W | L | % | Pts |
|---|---|---|---|---|---|---|
| 1 | City of Manchester Attitude | 24 | 20 | 4 | 0.833 | 40 |
| 2 | Liverpool Atac | 24 | 18 | 6 | 0.750 | 36 |
| 3 | Kingston Wildcats | 24 | 17 | 7 | 0.708 | 34 |
| 4 | Brixton TopCats | 24 | 17 | 7 | 0.708 | 34 |
| 5 | Reading Rockets | 24 | 17 | 7 | 0.708 | 34 |
| 6 | North London Lords | 24 | 16 | 8 | 0.667 | 32 |
| 7 | Hull Icebergs | 24 | 11 | 13 | 0.458 | 22 |
| 8 | Northampton 89ers | 24 | 11 | 13 | 0.458 | 22 |
| 9 | Flintshire Flyers | 24 | 10 | 14 | 0.417 | 20 |
| 10 | Portsmouth Pirates | 24 | 7 | 17 | 0.292 | 14 |
| 11 | Wandsworth Hurricanes | 24 | 5 | 19 | 0.208 | 10 |
| 12 | Bournemouth Blitz | 24 | 4 | 20 | 0.167 | 8 |
| 13 | Swindon Sonics | 24 | 3 | 21 | 0.125 | 6 |

| = League winners |
| = Qualified for the play-offs |

Play Off Final - Kingston 68 Manchester 62

== National League Division 3 (Tier 4) ==
=== Final standings ===
| Pos | Team | Pld | W | L | % | Pts |
|---|---|---|---|---|---|---|
| 1 | Doncaster Eagles | 24 | 23 | 1 | 0.958 | 46 |
| 2 | Mansfield Express | 24 | 20 | 4 | 0.833 | 40 |
| 3 | Ealing Tornadoes | 24 | 19 | 5 | 0.793 | 38 |
| 4 | Ware Fire | 24 | 16 | 8 | 0.667 | 32 |
| 5 | University of Birmingham | 24 | 15 | 9 | 0.625 | 30 |
| 6 | Bristol Bombers | 24 | 11 | 13 | 0.458 | 22 |
| 7 | NW London Wolverines | 24 | 9 | 15 | 0.375 | 18 |
| 8 | Barking & Dag. Erkenwald | 24 | 9 | 15 | 0.375 | 18 |
| 9 | Thames Valley Tigers II | 24 | 9 | 15 | 0.375 | 18 |
| 10 | Hanley Hornets | 24 | 7 | 17 | 0.293 | 14 |
| 11 | Brighton Cougars | 24 | 7 | 17 | 0.293 | 14 |
| 12 | Croydon Pumas | 24 | 6 | 18 | 0.250 | 12 |
| 13 | Derbyshire Arrows | 24 | 5 | 19 | 0.208 | 10 |

| = League winners |
| = Qualified for the play-offs |

Play Off Final - Mansfield v Doncaster 84-76, 75-75

== Sainsbury's Classic Cola National Cup ==
=== Last 16 ===
| Team 1 | Team 2 | Score |
|---|---|---|
| London Towers | Sutton Pumas | 76-68 |
| Sheffield Sharks | Derby Storm | 75-71 |
| Manchester Giants | Thames Valley Tigers | 94-71 |
| Edinburgh Rocks | Chester Jets | 96-83 |
| Plymouth Raiders | Leicester Riders | 60-77 |
| Birmingham Bullets | Brighton Bears | 80-91 |
| Solent Stars | Greater London Leopards | 88-100 |
| Newcastle Eagles | Milton Keynes Lions | 99-109 OT |

=== Quarter-finals ===
| Team 1 | Team 2 | Score |
|---|---|---|
| Sheffield Sharks | Brighton Bears | 89-75 |
| Manchester Giants | Leicester Riders | 86-73 |
| Milton Keynes Lions | Greater London Leopards | 91-75 |
| London Towers | Edinburgh Rocks | 75-78 |

=== Semi-finals ===
| Team 1 | Team 2 | Score |
|---|---|---|
| Sheffield Sharks | Milton Keynes Lions | 73-67 |
| Edinburgh Rocks | Manchester Giants | 60-82 |

=== Final ===
9 January 2000

| Sheffield Sharks | 89–80 | Manchester Giants |
| Pts: Nate Reinking (MVP) 21, Terrell Myers 20, Todd Cauthorn, Wilbur Johnson, Peter Scantlebury, Michael Payne, Richard Windle | | Pts: Tony Dorsey 35, Travis Conlan, Roy Hairston, Tony Holley, Phil Handy |

Sheffield Arena
Attendance: ?
Sharks coach Chris Finch
Manchester coach Nick Nurse

== uni-ball Trophy ==
=== Group stage ===
Group A

| Team | Pts | Pld | W | L | Percent |
|---|---|---|---|---|---|
| 1.Greater London Leopards | 10 | 6 | 5 | 1 | 0.833 |
| 2.Derby Storm | 6 | 6 | 3 | 3 | 0.500 |
| 3.Birmingham Bullets | 6 | 6 | 3 | 3 | 0.500 |
| 4.Solent Stars | 2 | 6 | 1 | 5 | 0.166 |

- Derby qualified ahead of Birmingham on head-to-head results.

Group B

| Team | Pts | Pld | W | L | Percent |
|---|---|---|---|---|---|
| 1.London Towers | 12 | 6 | 6 | 0 | 1.000 |
| 2.Thames Valley Tigers | 8 | 6 | 4 | 2 | 0.666 |
| 3.Edinburgh Rocks | 4 | 6 | 2 | 4 | 0.333 |
| 4.Leicester Riders | 0 | 6 | 0 | 6 | 0.000 |

Group C

| Team | Pts | Pld | W | L | Percent |
|---|---|---|---|---|---|
| 1.Manchester Giants | 12 | 6 | 6 | 0 | 1.000 |
| 2.Newcastle Eagles | 8 | 6 | 4 | 2 | 0.666 |
| 3.Milton Keynes Lions | 4 | 6 | 2 | 4 | 0.333 |
| 4.Sutton Pumas | 0 | 6 | 0 | 6 | 0.000 |

Group D

| Team | Pts | Pld | W | L | Percent |
|---|---|---|---|---|---|
| 1.Sheffield Sharks | 12 | 6 | 6 | 0 | 1.000 |
| 2.Chester Jets | 6 | 6 | 3 | 3 | 0.500 |
| 3.Brighton Bears | 6 | 6 | 3 | 4 | 0.500 |
| 4.Plymouth Raiders | 0 | 6 | 0 | 6 | 0.000 |

- Chester qualified ahead of Brighton on head-to-head results.

=== Quarter-finals ===
December 27, 1999

| Thames Valley Tigers | 91–84 | Greater London Leopards |

National Exhibition Centre, Birmingham

December 27, 1999

| Manchester Giants | 73–72 | Chester Jets |

National Exhibition Centre, Birmingham

December 27, 1999

| London Towers | 76–72 | Derby Storm |

National Exhibition Centre, Birmingham

December 27, 1999

| Newcastle Eagles | 74–95 | Sheffield Sharks |

National Exhibition Centre, Birmingham

=== Semi-finals ===
January 22, 2000

| London Towers | 90–80 | Thames Valley Tigers |

National Exhibition Centre, Birmingham

January 22, 2000

| Manchester Giants | 93–74 | Sheffield Sharks |

National Exhibition Centre, Birmingham

=== Final ===
March 18, 2000

Report

| London Towers | 74–73 | Manchester Giants |
| Pts: Donnie Johnson 21, Danny Lewis (MVP) 17, Steve Bucknall 12, Martin Henlan 12, Danny Craven, Phil Handy | | Pts: Roy Hairston 19, Tony Dorsey 17, Travis Conlan 12, Tony Holley 10 |

National Indoor Arena, Birmingham
Attendance: ?
Towers coach Ron Abbegglen
Giants coach Nick Nurse

== All-Star Game ==
February 5, 2000

Report

| Northern All-Stars | 177–180 | Southern All-Stars |
| Pts: Darrian Evans, 33 | | Pts: Shawn Jamison, 27 |

Manchester Evening News Arena, Manchester

Northern All-Stars
| Player | Team | No. of Selections |
|---|---|---|
| (United States) Tony Dorsey | Manchester Giants | 6th |
| (United States) Purnell Perry | Leicester Riders | 1st |
| (United States) James Hamilton | Chester Jets | 2nd |
| (United States) Darrian Evans | Derby Storm | 1st |
| (United States) John McCord | Edinburgh Rocks | 3d |
| (United States) Cypheus Bunton | Derby Storm | 1st |
| (United States) Terrell Myers | Sheffield Sharks | 3d |
| (United States) Ralph Blalock | Leicester Riders | 3d |
| (United States) Roy Hairston | Manchester Giants | 1st |
| (United States) Ted Berry | Edinburgh Rocks | 3d |
| (United States) Malcolm Leak | Leicester Riders | 2nd |
| (United States) Nate Reinking | Sheffield Sharks | 2nd |
| Coach | | |
| (United States) Nick Nurse | Manchester Giants | |

Southern All-Stars
| Player | Team | No. of Selections |
|---|---|---|
| (United States) Kenya Capers | Greater London Leopards | 1st |
| (United States) (United Kingdom) Tony Windless | Milton Keynes Lions | 6th |
| (United States) Danny Lewis | London Towers | 6th |
| (United States) Brandon Brantley | Greater London Leopards | 1st |
| (United States) Shawn Jamison | Birmingham Bullets | 1st |
| (United States) Eric Burks | Milton Keynes Lions | 4th |
| (United States) Casey Arena | Thames Valley Tigers | 1st |
| (United Kingdom) Steve Bucknall | London Towers | 3d |
| (Barbados) (United Kingdom) Nigel Lloyd | Milton Keynes Lions | 8th |
| (United States Virgin Islands) Charles Claxton | Brighton Bears | 1st |
| (United States) Donnie Johnson | London Towers | 1st |
| (Canada) Greg Meldrum | Thames Valley Tigers | 1st |
| Coach | | |
| (United States) Mike Finger | Birmingham Bullets | |

== Statistics leaders ==
| Category | Player | Stat |
|---|---|---|
| Points per game | (United States) (United Kingdom) Terrell Myers (Sheffield Sharks) | 24.2 |
| Rebounds per game | (United States) Brandon Brantley (Leopards) | 11.2 |
| Assists per game | (United States) Casey Arena (Thames Valley) | 6.2 |

== Seasonal awards ==
- Most Valuable Player: Tony Dorsey (Manchester Giants)
- Domestic Player of the Year: Steve Bucknall (London Towers)
- Import Player of the Year: Tony Dorsey (Manchester Giants)
- Defensive Player of the Year: Roy Hairston (Manchester Giants)
- Most Improved Player of the Year: Ian Whyte (Newcastle Eagles)
- Coach of the Year: Nick Nurse (Manchester Giants)
- All-Star First Team:
  - Tony Dorsey (Manchester Giants)
  - Danny Lewis (London Towers)
  - Terrell Myers (Sheffield Sharks)
  - Steve Bucknall (London Towers)
  - Roy Hairston (Manchester Giants)
- All-Star Second Team:
  - James Hamilton (Chester Jets)
  - Nigel Lloyd (Milton Keynes Lions)
  - Nate Reinking (Sheffield Sharks)
  - John McCord (Edinburgh Rocks)
  - Brandon Brantley (Greater London Leopards)

| Preceded by 1998–99 season | BBL seasons 1999–2000 | Succeeded by 2000–01 season |
