= Timeline of basketball on UK television =

This is a timeline of television coverage of basketball in the United Kingdom.

== 1980s ==
- The BBC shows highlights of the National Championship finals, airing the coverage Grandstand. Coverage had been shown since the late 1970s and continues throughout the decade.
- 1982
  - 8 November – The newly launched Channel 4 shows live sport for the first time when it broadcasts coverage of a match from Division One of the National Basketball League. It shows highlights of the first half of the game and live coverage of the second half.
- 1983
  - No events.
- 1984
  - No events.
- 1985
  - 28 September – The final edition of World of Sport is broadcast. Brief highlights of the NBA Finals had been shown on the programme from time to time, and the programme's cessation sees ITV's coverage of the NBA end until the late 1990s.
- 1986 to 1989
  - No events.

== 1990s ==
- 1990
  - No events.
- 1991
  - No events.
- 1992
  - No events.
- 1993
  - 1 March – Screensport closes following its merger with Eurosport in the hope that one would become financially profitable. The channel had shown regular coverage of the NBA since the mid 1980s. Coverage moves to Sky Sports.
- 1994
  - No events.
- 1995
  - 22 October – Sky Sports starts showing a weekly game from the British Basketball League (BBL).
- 1996
  - Sky Sports ends its coverage of the NBA.
- 1997
  - 30 March – Channel 5 launches and it broadcasts live American sport on weeknights, including games from the NBA.
- 1998
  - 17 January – The BBC shows live coverage of the National Cup final.
- 1999
  - The launch at the end of 1998 of ITV2 includes a deal to show brief NBA highlights and the start of 1999 sees the main ITV channel broadcast a weekly Saturday lunchtime 30-minute magazine called NBA '99
  - NTL outbids Sky with a 10-year, £22m contract to show the BBL. However the cable company did not capitalise on this and the BBL continues to be seen on Sky Sports.

== 2000s ==
- 2000
  - No events.
- 2001
  - May – Sky loses the rights to the British Basketball League to ITV, which shows coverage on its newly launched ITV Sport Channel.
- 2002
  - The closure of ITV Digital sees television coverage of the BBL end as no other broadcaster picks up the rights to the league. This results in a loss of exposure for the sport in the UK and in a significant loss of income to member clubs.
  - 5 December – NASN launches to show live and recorded coverage of North American sports which includes coverage of the National Basketball Association (NBA) and National Collegiate Athletic Association (NCAA)'s basketball tournaments.
- 2003
  - 12 January – The BBC shows live coverage of what was to be the last National Cup with BBL involvement. This brought to an end the BBC's coverage of live domestic basketball, having shown this event since 1998.
- 2004
  - No events.
- 2005
  - No events.
- 2006
  - September – MKTV does a deal with the British Basketball League to show 40 live games each year as well as marketing and sponsorship rights. However, no funds were ever forthcoming and the station would only broadcast two games.
- 2007
  - 4 March – MKTV broadcasts live coverage of the BBL Trophy final between Newcastle Eagles and Plymouth Raiders.
- 2008
  - February – Setanta Sports begins broadcasting one live BBL game a week.
- 2009
  - 1 February – NASN is renamed ESPN America following the sale in late 2006 of the channel to ESPN.
  - June – Channel 5’s coverage of the NBA ends.

== 2010s ==
- 2010
  - The British Basketball League returns to Sky Sports after a 9-year gap and broadcasts the league for the next three seasons.
- 2011
  - No events.
- 2012
  - No events.
- 2013
  - 6 October – The British Basketball League's own subscription-based online TV station BBL TV launches, and during the 2013–14 season match highlights were also televised and featured on British Eurosport each week.
  - 1 December – BT Sport shows its first NBA match, thereby adding professional basketball to its broadcasting of the college game which it shows as part of its coverage of the NCAA.
- 2014
  - No events.
- 2015
  - No events.
- 2016
  - February – The British Basketball League signs a two-year broadcast deal with the BBC, featuring both British Basketball League and Women's British Basketball League games. The games are to be mostly broadcast on the BBC Sport website with the showpiece finals also being broadcast on the BBC Red Button.
- 2017
  - No events.
- 2018
  - June – BT Sport shows the NBA for the final time ahead of the rights transferring to Sky Sports.
  - October – The NBA returns to Sky Sports after around a decade with ESPN and BT Sport.
- 2019
  - No events.

== 2020s ==
- 2020
  - 3 December – The British Basketball League returns to Sky Sports. The broadcaster shows 30 games per season. The deal also sees Sky broadcasting matches from the Women's British Basketball League.
- 2021
  - No events.
- 2022
  - No events.
- 2023
  - 29 March – The BBC shows the first of nine games from the final stages of the 2022–23 NBA season. The Corporation broadcasts six regular season games, two play-off games, one Conference Finals game and one NBA Finals game plus selected highlights and an end-of-season review show.
  - 18 July – BT Sport is relaunched as TNT Sports following the sale of BT Sport to Warner Bros. Discovery EMEA. and TNT decides not to show coverage of the NCAA.
  - 24 October – TNT replaces Sky as rights holder to the NBA. The deal will see TNT show more than 250 games each season.
  - November – Following an agreement with ESPN, Sky Sports begins showing three games of College Basketball each week.
- 2024
  - 29 March-8 April – For the first time, Sky Sports shows coverage of College Basketball's March Madness tournament. Sky also shows the 2025 tournament.
  - September – DAZN becomes the broadcaster of the newly launched Super League Basketball, which replaces the British Basketball League as the competition for men's professional basketball in the UK.
- 2025
  - October – DAZN becomes the new home of college basketball in the UK, broadcasting up to 20 games a week. The deal is achieved through a sub-licensing agreement with ESPN.
  - 21 October – Coverage of the NBA returns to Sky Sports, with games in the UK also available via Prime Video.
