= Belgian Basketball All-Star Game =

- Status: Inactive
- Frequency: Annually
- Inaugurated: 1998 and 2017
- Most recent: 2019
- Organizer: Belgian Basketball League

The Belgian Basketball All-Star Game was an annual basketball event in Belgium, organised by the Belgian Basketball League.

== History ==
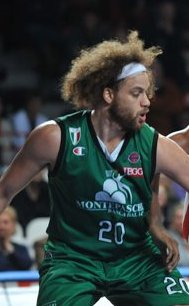
Shaun Stonerook played in the 2001 All-Star Game.

It was fist launched in 1998 and lasted until 2001. After a long hiatus, the event returned in 2017, under the name Orange All Star Game. It took place in Kortrijk with the selection limited to only home-grown players of the EuroMillions Basketball League (a player should have had at least four years of training in Belgium between the ages of 12 and 21). In the following 2018 edition, all players of the league (including foreigners) were eligible for selection.

The profits from the 2019 edition (the 3d Orange All Star Game) at the Forest National, were donated to an association committed to the fight against cancer.

The 2020 and 2021 editions were suspended due to COVID-19. It has not been held since 2019.

Well-known players like J.R. Holden, Shaun Stonerook, Ron Ellis, Roger Huggins and Tomas Van Den Spiegel have featured in the All-Star Game.

== List of games ==
Bold: Team that won the game.

Year	Date / Location	Team 1	Score	Team 2	MVP	Club
1998						
1999						
2000					(United Kingdom) Roger Huggins	Racing Basket Antwerpen
2001	7 January	**East All Stars**	**127**-120	West All Stars	(United States) (Belgium) Ralph Biggs	Sunair Oostende
2002-2016	Not held					
2017	29 December, Kortrijk	Team Orange	107-**109**	**Team Black**	(Belgium) Anthony Lambot	Leuven Bears
2018	27 December, Kortrijk	Team Belgium	116-**127**	**Team World**		
2019	28 December, Forest National, Brussels	Team Belgium	111-**118**	**Team World**	not awarded	-

== Three-Point Shoot Contest ==
Season	Player	Team
2000-01	(Belgium) Danny Herman	
2017-18	(Belgium) Terry Deroover	Liege Basket
2018-19	(United States) Matt Mobley	Spirou Charleroi
2019-20	(United States) Katin Reinhardt	Union Mons-Hainaut

== Slam-Dunk winners ==
Season	Player	Team
2017-18	(Belgium) Hans Vanwijn	Antwerp Giants
2018-19	(Belgium) Ismaël Bako	Antwerp Giants
2019-20	(Belgium) Francis Torreborre	Liège Basket

== Skill Challenge winners ==
Season	Player	Team
2018-19	(Belgium) Senne Geukens	Okapi Aalstar
2019-20	(Montenegro) Vladimir Mihailovic	Okapi Aalstar

== Topscorers ==
Season	Player	Points	Team
2000-01	(United States) Otis Hill	19	Racing Antwerpen
2017-18	(Belgium) Vincent Kesteloot	24	BC Oostende
2018-19	(United States) Zach Thomas	19	Okapi Aalst

== Players with most appearances ==
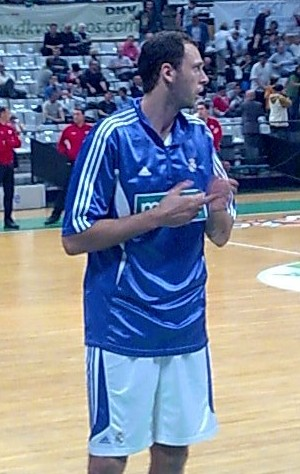
Current president of ULEB, Tomas Van Den Spiegel played in the 2000 and 2001 editions.

Player	All-Star	Editions	Notes
(Belgium) Jacques Stas	3	1998, 1999, 2000	
(United Kingdom) Roger Huggins	3	1999, 2000, 2001	2000 Belgian All Star Game MVP
(United States) Jim Potter	3	1998, 2000, 2001	
(United States) (Belgium) Ralph Biggs	2	2000, 2001	2001 Belgian All Star Game MVP
(Belgium) Tomas Van Den Spiegel	2	2000, 2001	
(Belgium) Eric Cleymans	2	1998, 2000	

== See also ==
- DBL All-Star Gala
