= Eric Burks =

American basketball player

Personal information
- Born: February 22, 1972 (age 54) Atlanta, Georgia, U.S.
- Listed height: 6 ft 4 in (1.93 m)

Career information
- High school: McNair (DeKalb County, Georgia)
- College: Clemson (1990–1992); Charleston Southern (1993–1995)
- NBA draft: 1995: undrafted
- Playing career: 1996–2005
- Position: Point guard

Career history
- 1996–1999: London Leopards
- 1999–2000: Milton Keynes Lions
- 2000–2001: London Towers
- 2001–2002: Thames Valley Tigers
- 2002: SLUC Nancy Basket
- 2002: Pallacanestro Pavia
- 2002: Leicester Riders
- 2003: Pallacanestro Pavia
- 2005: Halcones de Guamúchil

Career highlights
- BBL MVP (1998); 2× BBL champion (1997, 1998); 4× BBL All-Star (1997–2000); Big South Player of the Year (1995); First-team All-Big South (1995); Second-team All-Big South (1994); Big South tournament MVP (1995)

Eric Burks (born February 22, 1972) is an American former professional basketball player. He had a 10-year career, most of which was spent playing in the British Basketball League (BBL). Burks was a four-time BBL All-Star and one-time BBL MVP.

== College ==
Burks enrolled in the fall of 1990 to suit up for the Clemson Tigers. In his freshman season he averaged 9.0 points per game in 20 games played, although he was cited as "erratic" at times. The following year, Burks left the school for personal reasons before the season began, although he returned midway through his sophomore year and was deemed eligible by the NCAA to play the rest of the 1991–92 season. Following his second season, he was named academically ineligible to play for Clemson. Burks transferred schools and wound up at Charleston Southern University (CSU).

In 1992–93 he was forced to redshirt. When he became eligible to play for the Buccaneers in 1993–94, his junior season, Burks made an immediate impact. He was named a second team all-Big South Conference player as he led the school in scoring. Then, in his senior season in 1994–95, he once again led the team in scoring but was named both a first team all-conference performer as well as the Big South Player of the Year. In just two seasons at CSU, Burks scored 1,139 points and averaged 20.3 points per game for his career (third all-time in school history). In 2006, he was named to the school's hall of fame.

== Professional ==
Burks was undrafted in the 1995 NBA draft following his career as a collegian. He embarked on a professional career that saw him play for teams in Italy, Mexico, England, and France. His most successful seasons as a professional came while playing in the BBL. During his career in England, Burks won two league titles, one National Cup, was a four-time BBL All-Star and was the league's MVP in the 1997–98 season. Burks retired in 2005 after playing for Halcones de Guamúchil in Mexico.
