= Bob Donewald Jr. =

American basketball coach (born 1970)

South Carolina Gamecocks
- Position: Assistant coach
- League: Southeastern Conference

Personal information
- Born: January 26, 1970 (age 56)

Career information
- College: Western Michigan
- Coaching career: 1994–present

Career history

Coaching
- 1994–1996: Morehead State (assistant)
- 1996–1998: Leicester Riders
- 1998–1999: Derby Storm
- 1999–2001: Greater London Leopards
- 2001–2002: Charlotte Hornets (assistant)
- 2002–2003: New Orleans Hornets (assistant)
- 2003–2004: Cleveland Cavaliers (assistant)
- 2005–2006: Objetivo São Carlos
- 2007–2008: UAB (assistant)
- 2009–2011: Shanghai Sharks
- 2011: Xinjiang Flying Tigers
- 2014–2016: Iowa Energy
- 2016–2017: Jilin Northeast Tigers
- 2019: Lokomotiv Kuban
- 2020–2021: Texas Tech (special assistant)
- 2021–2023: Texas (assistant)
- 2023–2026: Ole Miss (assistant)
- 2026–present: South Carolina (assistant)

Robert Michael Donewald Jr. (born January 26, 1970) is an American basketball coach who is currently an assistant coach for the South Carolina Gamecocks. He was an NBA assistant with the New Orleans Hornets and Cleveland Cavaliers from 2001 to 2004, and an ABA (American Basketball Association) head coach from 2004 to 2005. He is the son of Bob Donewald Sr., a retired American college basketball head coach.

== Early career ==
Prior to his time with the Hornets, Donewald spent five years as a head coach and general manager in the British Basketball League (BBL), leading his teams to the finals of the championship series on three occasions. He started his time in England as the head coach and general manager of the Leicester Riders (1996–98). Previously known as perennial losers, Donewald was able to take the franchise to finals of the National Cup in 1998. The next season (1998–99), he became head coach of the Derby Storm and coached the team to the finals of the uni-ball Trophy. After taking the reins for the Greater London Leopards in 1999–2000, Donewald led the Leopards to a 24–10 record and the finals of the National Cup during the 2000–01 season.

Donewald began his coaching career as a student assistant coach at Western Michigan from 1989 to 1993. He also has experience as an assistant coach at Morehead State from 1994 to 1996.

== Coach of Chinese National Team ==
In 2009, after Yao Ming took control of the Shanghai Sharks, a Chinese Basketball Association team, he chose Donewald as the coach of the team. And in the following 2009–10 season, the team ranked 4th in the league and entered Playoffs for the first time since 2006–07 season. At last, they lost to Guangdong Southern Tigers in the Semifinal. But Donewald was greatly appraised in China for his coaching.

As a result of the good performance of Shanghai Sharks in this season, Donewald was chosen as the coach of Chinese National Basketball Team to replace his predecessor Guo Shiqiang on April 30, 2010, and thus left Shanghai Sharks. He became the third coach of the team who was not Chinese after Del Harris and Jonas Kazlauskas.

After he became the coach of the Chinese National Team, China got expected results in the world, and continued its dominance in Asia. The Chinese National Basketball Team ranked 14th in the 2010 FIBA World Championship, and won the championship in the 2010 Asian Games as well as the 2011 FIBA Asia Championship.

On June 29, 2011, Donewald became the coach of Xinjiang Flying Tigers, another Chinese Basketball Association team, besides his role in the Chinese National Team. But he was fired on December 19 that year because of his conflict with the manager of the team.
