= Montpellier Paillade Basket =

French basketball club

- Founded: 1982
- Dissolved: 2002
- History: Montpellier Hérault Sport Club Basket; 1982–1989; Montpellier Paillade Basket (1989–2002)
- Arena: Pierre-de-Coubertin Sports Palace
- Capacity: 4,800
- Championships: 1 LNB Pro B

Montpellier Paillade Basket was a French basketball club, based in the city of Montpellier. The club has evolved among the elite of French basketball (N1A and Pro) for 14 seasons between 1989 and 2002, but was dissolved in 2002 after filing for bankruptcy that same year.

== History ==
Created in 1982, following the merger of clubs "AS Paillade" and "Juvignac", the club was taken over by Louis Nicollin in the mid 80s and became the basketball section of Montpellier Paillade Sports Club (MPSC). In 1989, under pressure from the municipality, the section takes its autonomy under the name Montpellier Basketball and now plays in blue and white. The club will then take the appellation Montpellier Paillade Basketball to emphasize its roots in the district of Paillade where is the Palace of Pierre de Coubertin sports.

== Honours & achievements ==
French League

- Quarter-finalists (4): 1988–89, 1992–93, 1994–95, 1996–97

French League 2

- Champions (1): 1987–88

French Federation Cup

- Runners-up (1): 1987

== Notable players ==
Note: Flags indicate national team eligibility at FIBA-sanctioned events. Players may hold other non-FIBA nationalities not displayed.

Criteria

To appear in this section a player must have either:

- Set a club record or won an individual award while at the club
- Played at least one official international match for their national team at any time
- Played at least one official NBA match at any time.

- (France) Hervé Dubuisson
- (United States) James Scott
- (United States) Troy Brown
- (United States) - (United Kingdom) Tony Windless
- (United States) Todd Mitchell

== Head coaches ==
- (France) Pierre Galle
- (France) Hervé Dubuisson
