= 1995 Big South Conference men's basketball tournament =

- Classification: Division I
- Season: 1994–95
- Teams: 8
- Site: Vines Center; Lynchburg, VA
- Champions: Charleston Southern (3rd title)
- Winning coach: Gary Edwards (1st title)
- MVP: Eric Burks (Charleton Southern)

1994–95 Big South Conference men's basketball standings
	Conf.				Overall
Team	W		L	PCT	W		L	PCT
UNC Greensboro	14	–	2	.875	20	–	6	.769
Charleston Southern †	12	–	4	.750	19	–	10	.655
UMBC	10	–	6	.625	13	–	14	.481
Radford	9	–	7	.563	16	–	12	.571
Liberty	7	–	9	.438	12	–	16	.429
UNC Asheville	7	–	9	.438	11	–	16	.407
Towson State	6	–	10	.375	12	–	15	.444
Winthrop	4	–	12	.250	7	–	20	.259
Coastal Carolina	3	–	13	.188	6	–	20	.231
† 1995 Big South tournament winner Rankings from AP Poll

The 1995 Big South Conference men's basketball tournament took place March 3–5, 1995, at the Vines Center in Lynchburg, Virginia, the home of the Liberty Flames. For the third time in their school history, the Charleston Southern Buccaneers won the tournament, led by head coach Gary Edwards.

Before the season, Campbell departed the Big South due to scheduling conflicts. This left the conference with just five teams having played at the Division I level for at least five years, short of the six such members required by the NCAA for a conference to receive an automatic bid into the NCAA tournament. As a result, the Big South did not have an automatic qualifier to the 1995 NCAA tournament, its first time without an auto-bid since 1990; it regained an auto-bid in 1996 and has maintained an auto-bid in every year since, as of 2021.

Charleston Southern would receive its first NCAA tournament bid in 1997.

== Format ==
The top eight finishers of the conference's nine teams participated in the tournament, hosted at the Vines Center. Teams were seeded by conference winning percentage. This was the last year for Towson as a member of the conference.

== Bracket ==
Quarterfinals; March 3
1	UNC Greensboro	75
8	Winthrop	51
4	Radford	63
5	UNC Asheville	47
3	UMBC	54
6	Liberty	57
2	Charleston Southern	85
7	Towson State	55

Semifinals; March 4
1	UNC Greensboro	71
4	Radford	59
2	Charleston Southern	60
6	Liberty	58

Finals; March 5
1	UNC Greensboro	67
2	Charleston Southern	68

* Asterisk indicates overtime game

- Source

== All-Tournament Team ==
- Eric Burks, Charleston Southern
- Brett Larrick, Charleston Southern
- Derrick Nix, UNC Greensboro
- Eric Cuthrell, UNC Greensboro
- Antoine Dalton, Radford
