= Troy Brown (basketball, born 1971) =

American basketball player (born 1971)

Personal information
- Born: April 3, 1971 (age 55) Lynn, Massachusetts, U.S.
- Listed height: 6 ft 8 in (2.03 m)
- Listed weight: 238 lb (108 kg)

Career information
- High school: Governor Dummer Academy (Byfield, Massachusetts); Brewster Academy (Wolfeboro, New Hampshire)
- College: Providence (1990–1995)
- NBA draft: 1995: 2nd round, 45th overall pick
- Drafted by: Atlanta Hawks
- Playing career: 1995–2007
- Position: Small forward

Career history
- 1995–1996: Grand Rapids Mackers
- 1996: Connecticut Pride
- 1996–1997: MTV Flippers Giessen
- 1997: Oyak Renault
- 1997–1998: Connecticut Pride
- 1998–1999: ALM Évreux Basket
- 1999–2000: Bosch Blue Winds
- 2001: Montpellier Paillade Basket
- 2002–2003: Sioux Falls Skyforce
- 2003: Club Deportivo Libertad
- 2004–2005: Boston Frenzy
- 2005: Petro Atletico de Luanda
- 2005–2007: Rochester RazorSharks

Career highlights
- ABA champion (2006); CBA All-Star (1998)
- Stats at Basketball Reference

Troy Sidney Brown (born April 3, 1971) is an American former professional basketball player. He played college basketball for the Providence Friars and was selected by the Atlanta Hawks in the second round of the 1995 NBA draft.

== College career ==
Born in Lynn, Massachusetts, Brown attended Providence College, where he played as a small forward. He debuted for the Friars in 1990–91, going on to redshirt the 1993–94 season, and then playing his senior season in 1994–95. As a senior, he averaged 12 points and 7.9 rebounds per game and shot 52 percent from the field.

== Professional career ==
Brown performed well at the Portsmouth Invitational Tournament, an annual showcase for NBA draft candidates. He averaged 20.3 points and 13.7 rebounds, earning selection to the all-tournament team. Brown was selected by the Atlanta Hawks in the second round (45th pick overall) of the 1995 NBA draft. He suffered a foot injury prior to the Hawks' training camp. He did not play any games as a Hawk, or in the National Basketball Association (NBA).

In the 1995–96 season, Brown played in the Continental Basketball Association (CBA) for the Grand Rapids Mackers before being traded to the Connecticut Pride.

In the 1996–97 season, Brown played for MTV Flippers Giessen in Germany.

Brown began the 1997–98 season with a two-game stint with Oyak Renault in Turkey, before returning to the Pride for the 1997–98 CBA season. He was voted a starter for the 1998 CBA All-Star Game.

In the 1998–99 season, Brown played for ALM Évreux Basket in France.

In the 1999–2000 season, Brown played for Bosch Blue Winds in Japan.

After sitting out the 2000–01 season, Brown had a four-game stint with Montpellier Paillade Basket in France to begin the 2001–02 season.

Brown had a third stint in the CBA for the 2002–03 season with the Sioux Falls Skyforce.

Brown started the 2003–04 season in Argentina with Club Deportivo Libertad but left in November 2003 after appearing in seven games.

In November 2004, Brown joined the Boston Frenzy of the American Basketball Association (ABA) for the 2004–05 season. Through the first nine games of the team's inaugural ABA season, Brown was leading the league in rebounding. In February 2005, he joined Petro Atletico de Luanda in Angola.

Brown spent the 2005–06 and 2006–07 seasons with the Rochester RazorSharks in the ABA.
