= MKTV =

Satellite UK TV channel

MKTV was a satellite television channel, based in Milton Keynes, United Kingdom. The channel was launched on 26 February 2006 and created by businessman Jawad Siddiqui. The channel was broadcast on Sky channel 227, although it would be shutdown later in April, 2007.

== Basketball coverage ==
In late 2006, MKTV signed-up with the British Basketball League in a £2.5 million deal. The deal meant that the station would broadcast 40 live games each year as well as marketing and sponsorship rights. However, no funds were ever forthcoming. The station would only broadcast two games - one of these was the 2007 Trophy Final between Newcastle Eagles and Plymouth Raiders.

== Station problems ==
MKTV was heavily criticised by viewers for a number of reasons, including the low quality of the station's few local programmes, heavy usage of repeated import programmes such as The Beverly Hillbillies and frequent technical difficulties. One such on-air incident saw much of the scheduled programming over two days fail to materialise.

The launch of MKTV was delayed several times because of legal action being taken against station owner, Jawad Siddiqui. Allegations were also made by staff working for the company and a number of suppliers, claiming that they had never been paid.

== Closure ==
The channel closed as a local Milton Keynes station on Monday 30 April 2007 although MKTV resumed broadcasting for two periods under different management and airing other programming.

The channel has since been closed permanently.
