= Billy Mims =

American basketball coach

Personal information
- Born: Moncks Corner, South Carolina

Career information
- College: Baptist College at Charleston
- Coaching career: 1981–present

Career history

Coaching
- 1981-82: Charleston Cougars (assistant)
- 1982-83: Winthrop Eagles (assistant)
- 1983-84: Lander Bearcats (assistant)
- 1984-86: Winthrop Eagles (assistant)
- 1986-87: Neptune
- 1987-88: Chowan Hawks (assistant)
- 1988-94: Barry Buccaneers
- 1994-99: Greater London Leopards
- 1999-03: Leicester Riders
- 2004-05: UT Permian Basin Falcons
- 2005–25: Florida Tech Panthers

Billy Mims is an American basketball coach who was the head coach of Florida Tech Panthers from 2005 to 2025.

== Coaching career ==
=== Greater London Leopards ===
Mims was recruited to his first professional head coaching role to lead the fledging Leopards franchise in their inaugural BBL season in 1994. A charismatic and animated figure, Mims developed the Leopards on-court, culminating in winning the BBL Cup in 1997, and BBL Championship titles in 1997 and 1998, the latter rewarding him with the BBL Coach of the Year title.

=== Leicester Riders ===
After leaving the Leopards during the 1999–00 season, Mims was appointed head coach at the struggling Leicester Riders. The Riders had started the season 0–18, and had made the post season Playoffs in just one season in the prior five. Following Mims' appointment, the Riders saved face to finish the season with a 10–26 record. The following season, with odds against the Riders once more, the team confounded expectations to win the 2001 BBL Playoffs and National Cup. As the oldest basketball club in the United Kingdom, this was the first silverware the club had ever won. The success could not last, however, and following poor seasons in 2002 and 2003, and a difficult start to the 2003–04 season, the Riders parted company with Mims.

=== Florida Tech ===
After one year at the UT Permian Basin Falcons, Mims was appointed head coach of the Florida Tech Panthers in June 2005. In 2018, Mims became the all-time winningest coach in Florida Tech history. He stepped down at the end of the 2024–25 season. His overall record with the program is 273–279.

== Broadcasting career ==
Mims regularly worked as a basketball pundit for Sky Sports in their coverage of the NBA and BBL, a role he first took on in his days as coach of the Leopards in London.
