= East Scotland Warriors =

- League: British Basketball League
- Location: Edinburgh, Scotland
- Ownership: (United States) Donald Sampley

East Scotland Warriors was a proposed British professional basketball team to be based in Edinburgh, Scotland, and members of the British Basketball League. Established in 2013, the team were to commence play in the 2015–16 season, using Meadowbank Arena as its home venue. Following an agreement between the BBL and the Warriors ownership that the franchise would defer their entry into the League due to concerns over its financial backing; the team later did not materialise and withdrew its entry.

== Franchise history ==
A bid to launch a British Basketball League franchise in Edinburgh was first rumoured by the media in early 2011. Donald Sampley, an American businessman based in St. Louis, Missouri, was reported as the driving force behind the bid. A former player for amateur Scottish Basketball League team Troon Tornadoes, Sampley outlined his plans to local media in April 2011. Initial reports suggested that the franchise would use the Meadowbank Arena - former home of the Edinburgh Rocks - as its home venue and were aiming for a launch in time for the 2013–14 season.

In January 2013, it was reported that an official application had been made to join the BBL, along with bids from Bristol, Reading and York. On 8 July 2013, it was announced that the bid was successful and that Edinburgh's new team would start play in the 2014–15 season, becoming the League's 15th member. The team name was revealed as the East Scotland Warriors which, according to Sampley, was chosen so the new franchise could reach "a much wider area than just the Capital and will go right up to include Aberdeen."

It was announced on 8 May 2014 that, following an agreement between the BBL and the Warriors ownership, the franchise deferred and eventually withdrew its entry due to major concerns over its financial backing.

== See also ==
- British Basketball League
- Edinburgh Rocks
