= Derby Storm =

- League: British Basketball League
- Established: 1984
- Folded: 2002
- History: Derby Turbos; 1984–1985; Derby Rams; 1985–1991; Derby Bucks; 1991–1995; Derby Storm; 1995–2002
- Location: Derby, Derbyshire
- Ownership: Mike Horton

Derby Storm was a British Basketball League (BBL) franchise from the city of Derby, Derbyshire. The team decided to sit out the 2002–03 season after failing to find a suitable venue for home games. Despite early efforts for a new arena, the franchise never returned to playing action.

Founded in 1984 as the Derby Turbos later changed to Derby Rams in 1985. (which NBA head coach Nick Nurse was a player/coach), the team was a founder member of the franchise-based professional BBL when it was set up in 1987. Another name change took place in 1991, becoming the Derby Bucks, and in 1993 the franchise withdrew from the BBL due to financial problems, but was "rescued" and allowed to re-enter before the new season began.

Future Toronto Raptors coach and NBA championship winner Nick Nurse was a player-coach for Derby in 1990.

The team became known as the Derby Storm in 1995 and was the first British basketball club to own their own venue, the Thunderdome a.k.a. Storm Arena, which was in fact a converted factory. The compact arena was definitely one of the most characteristic venues in the League, and often the subject of many jokes from rival fans.

Storm were given permission to "sit out" the 2002–03 season, to generate finance and find an alternative venue, but having not returned since, the franchise membership with the BBL has lapsed. Basketball remained in the city however as fans took it upon themselves to take control of Storm's reserve team and reform them as Derby Trailblazers. The Blazers adopted one of Storm's former homes, the Moorways Centre, as their home venue.

== Season-by-season records ==
Season	Division	Tier	Regular Season						Post-Season	BBL Trophy	National Cup	Head coach
Season	Division	Tier	Finish	Played	Wins	Losses	Points	Win %	Post-Season	BBL Trophy	National Cup	Head coach
Derby Turbos
1984–85	NBL D2	2	4th	22	16	6	32	0.727				Chris Squire
Derby Rams
1985–86	NBL D2	2	2nd	22	18	4	36	0.818				Chris Squire
1986–87	NBL D1	1	13th	24	4	20	8	0.167	Did not qualify		2nd round (NC)	David Lloyd
1987–88	BBL	1	13th	28	4	24	8	0.142	Did not qualify	Pool Stage (BT)	2nd round (NC)	Clarence Wiggins
1988–89	BBL	1	10th	20	3	17	6	0.150	Did not qualify	Quarter-finals (BT)	Quarter-finals (NC)	Clarence Wiggins
1989–90	BBL	1	5th	28	10	18	20	0.357	Did not qualify	Pool Stage (BT)	Semi-finals (NC)	Ron Whitehead
1990–91	BBL	1	5th	24	12	12	24	0.500	Quarter-finals	Pool Stage (BT)	1st round (NC)	Nick Nurse
Derby Bucks
1991–92	BBL	1	5th	30	18	12	36	0.600	Quarter-finals	Pool Stage (BT)	Quarter-finals (NC)	Terry Manghum
1992–93	BBL	1	6th	33	14	19	28	0.424	Quarter-finals	Semi-finals (BT)	Quarter-finals (NC)	Terry Manghum
1993–94	BBL	1	8th	36	17	19	34	0.473	Quarter-finals	Pool Stage (BT)	3rd round (NC)	Terry Manghum
1994–95	BBL	1	9th	36	10	26	20	0.278	Did not qualify	Pool Stage (BT)	4th round (NC)	Greg Gurr
Derby Storm
1995–96	BBL	1	6th	36	21	15	42	0.583	Quarter-finals	Quarter-finals (BT)	4th round (NC)	Jeff Jones
1996–97	BBL	1	9th	36	14	22	28	0.389	Did not qualify	Pool Stage (BT)	4th round (NC)	Jeff Jones
1998–99	BBL	1	7th	36	16	20	32	0.444	Quarter-finals	Pool Stage (BT)	4th round (NC)	Steve Tucker
1998–99	BBL	1	6th	36	21	15	42	0.583	Quarter-finals	Runners-up, losing to Manchester (BT)	Quarter-finals (NC)	Bob Donewald Jr.
1999–00	BBL NC	1	5th	36	17	19	34	0.472	Did not qualify	Quarter-finals (BT)	4th round (NC)	Martin Ford
2000–01	BBL NC	1	6th	36	6	30	12	0.166	Did not qualify	Quarter-finals (BT)	Quarter-finals (NC)	Kevin Wall
2001–02	BBL NC	1	6th	32	3	29	6	0.094	Did not qualify	Pool Stage (BT)	4th round (NC)	John Spezia

== See also ==
- John Trezvant
