= Tony Windless =

American basketball player

Personal information
- Born: October 14, 1969 (age 57) Memphis, Tennessee
- Listed height: 6 ft 5 in (1.96 m)

Career information
- High school: Northside (Memphis, Tennessee)
- College: Cowley County CC (1988–1990); Georgia Southern (1990–1992)
- NBA draft: 1992: undrafted
- Playing career: 1992–2011
- Position: Small forward

Career history
- 1994–1997: London Towers
- 1997–1998: Derby Storm
- 1998–2000: Milton Keynes Lions
- 2000–2001: Newcastle Eagles
- 2001–2002: Montpellier
- 2002–2003: Gravelines
- 2003: Le Mans
- 2003–2004: Besançon
- 2004–2005: Scottish Rocks
- 2005–2008: Milton Keynes Lions
- 2008–2011: Leicester Riders

Career highlights
- TAAC Player of the Year (1992); First-team All-TAAC (1992); Second-team All-TAAC (1991)

Tony Windless (born October 14, 1969) is an American retired professional basketball player with a notable career stretching over a decade in the British Basketball League.

Tony has won numerous honors throughout his career and is regarded as one of the notable players in the British leagues.

The 6ft5 small forward began his pro career in 1994 when he signed for the London Towers, after attending Georgia Southern University. His debut for Towers came on November 11 in a home game against Leicester Riders, and after many more successful appearances during the 1994–95 season, Windless was elected to the All-Star game and made the final BBL All-Star Team, the first of many more accolades.

His three-season spell at the Towers would be his most successful throughout his career. The 1995–96 season saw the beginning of the trophy spree, when Windless helped the Towers to a 70–58 National Cup final victory against the Sheffield Sharks, on their own turf. A 90–84 win over Worthing Bears in the Trophy final, in which he was named MVP, and a first-place finish in the League bulked up Windless' trophy cabinet, along with his personal awards of an All-Star game appearance and a spot in the All-Star Team at the end of the season.

The following season, which saw another him elected to another All-Star game appearance, Tony helped Towers to another Trophy win and a victorious Playoff run, beating fierce rivals Greater London Leopards 89–88 in an intense Wembley final. The victory made all the more sweeter, after Leopards had pipped Towers to the league crown just weeks earlier.

After claiming every title in the game at Towers, Windless headed north from the capital in 1997 when he signed for Derby Storm, where he played in 22 games, averaging 15.15 PPG. After just a year in Derby, Tony relocated to Milton Keynes Lions for two years, where he found increased minutes and an improved points average, achieving his career high in the 1999–00 season, posting 19.65. This record would be smashed the following season after signing for Newcastle Eagles, where in 31 games played, Windless tallied an impressive 21.32 PPG, still his best season average to date.

While in Newcastle, he regained his impeccable form from the Towers days, leading the previously fledgling franchise to a Trophy final, in which they finished runners-up to the victorious Chester Jets, 92–81. For the seventh consecutive season, Windless was featured in the All-Star game for 2001, where he was named as MVP for the final ever event. He was also reselected for the BBL All-Star Team following a three-year absence.

It seemed as though his career was on the up, and a move to Europe was too good to turn down. After starring in the French leagues for Montpellier, Gravelines and Besançon, Windless returned to the UK in 2004 to play for Scottish Rocks.

After one season in Glasgow, where he averaged just 13.5 PPG in 31.75 minutes-per-game, he was off again, returning to his former club Milton Keynes Lions, where he starred alongside a squad of fellow veteran stars until 2008, when he signed for the Leicester Riders.
