= British Basketball League =

Former professional basketball league founded 1987

- Founded: 1987; 39 years ago
- First season: 1987–88
- Folded: 2023–24
- Replaced by: Super League Basketball (SLB)
- Country: United Kingdom
- Federation: British Basketball
- Confederation: FIBA Europe
- Number of teams: 10
- Level on pyramid: 1
- Domestic cup(s): BBL Cup; BBL Trophy
- International cup(s): EuroCup Basketball; Champions League; FIBA Europe Cup
- Last champions: London Lions (3rd title) (2023–24)
- Most championships: Newcastle Eagles (7 titles)
- TV partners: Sky Sports; YouTube
- Website: BBL.org.uk

The British Basketball League (BBL) was a men's professional basketball league in Great Britain.

From its establishment in 1987, the BBL represented the highest level of basketball competition within the United Kingdom. However the league - and the organisation that operated the competition, Basketball League Limited - folded in July 2024 after the British Basketball Federation terminated its operating licence due to significant financial difficulties. It was succeeded as the top-level men's basketball competition by Super League Basketball.

The BBL operated as a franchise model where each member team is located within a defined geographic area. At the point of its demise, the League featured 10 member franchises from England and Scotland who were part-owners of the organisation and a chairman was elected by the teams to oversee operations. The League offices were located in Leicester where the country's oldest team, the Leicester Riders, was also based.

The BBL sat above the English National Basketball League and the Scottish Basketball Championship, which effectively formed the second tier of basketball competition in Great Britain. Due to the franchise model, there was no promotion or relegation between the lower leagues and the BBL, although several BBL member teams had previously competed in the National Basketball League.

In addition to the regular season league championship, the BBL also staged two knockout competitions; the BBL Trophy and the end-of-season BBL Playoffs. Previously the organisation also ran the BBL Cup and BBL Cup Winners' Cup competitions, though these were last contested in 2023 and 2009 respectively. In partnership with Basketball England the organisation launched a women's league in 2014, branded as the Women's British Basketball League (WBBL).

== History ==
See: List of British Basketball League seasons

=== Origins and foundation ===
Competitive national basketball in Great Britain has existed since 1936 when the Amateur Basket Ball Association (ABBA) founded the ABBA National Championship, a knockout competition featuring the regional champions from across England and Wales. An equivalent competition for Scotland was formed by the Amateur Basketball Association of Scotland in 1947. As fully amateur championships, the competitions were largely dominated by victorious teams from universities, YMCAs and Royal Air Force stations. A short-lived attempt at establishing a truly national league competition in the 1960s was met with some success; at its height the competition, known as the 'Rosebowl', featured 16 teams from across England, Scotland and Wales. In 1969, Scotland established its own national league with the ABBA following shortly after, with the formation of the National Basketball League (NBL) in 1972.

Over the next 15 years, basketball's popularity in Great Britain grew steadily and annual revenues for the ABBA – renamed as the English Basket Ball Association (EBBA) in 1975 – increased from £23,440 in 1972 to £303,500 in 1981. With the increased commercial potential of basketball and the NBL evident, teams started to attract entrepreneurial owners and benefactors along with football clubs, such as Manchester United and Portsmouth, looking to replicate the multi-modal sporting club patented by European powerhouses such as Real Madrid and Barcelona. In 1982, the NBL reached a broadcasting deal with newly launched television channel Channel 4, further increasing the visibility of the league to a national audience. The NBL's upward commercial trajectory continued with the EBBA signing sponsorship agreements with major national companies such as Prudential Insurance, Bell's whisky and the Carlsberg Group, generating an estimated income of £1,196,000. A joint venture company, Basketball Marketing Limited, was established in 1982 by the EBBA and team owners to market the league collectively to potential sponsors and share revenue from TV contracts; with the agreement that 40% of revenue was held by the EBBA and the remaining 60% shared between all member teams.

In 1983, the Basketball Owners' Association (BOA) was established by owners of 9 different NBL teams to represent their interests as internal conflict arose regarding the financial relationship between them and the EBBA. Kevin Routledge, a director at Leicester Riders, claimed at the time that "there was a feeling about men's clubs that insufficient emphasis was being given to them, particularly recognising that in terms of spectator, sponsorship and media appeal they were very much top of the heap." The sentiment was echoed by Dave Elderkin, Manager of Sunderland 76ers, who noted that sponsorship revenue was divided between the EBBA's 650 member clubs, and though the Division 1 teams generated the most sponsorship they were only receiving a small fraction of the return; Sunderland were reportedly paid just £2,000 from central sponsorship earnings in 1986.

By April 1986, still unsatisfied by the relationship with the EBBA, a contingent of team owners set forth to organise a breakaway competition, dubbed the British Basketball League. The initiative was led by John Deacon, owner of Portsmouth, who had rallied support for the new league from fellow teams Bracknell Pirates, Crystal Palace, Edinburgh, Hemel Hempstead & Watford Royals, Kingston and Sunderland, with each team contributing a £5,000 entry fee. Not all teams were initially onboard with the new proposals however, as established names like Birmingham Bullets first rejected the move and opted to stay within the existing EBBA structure. The EBBA established a Committee of Inquiry to conduct a review and establish the terms of the handover, and a new organisation – the Basketball League Limited – was formed by the team owners to oversee the operations of the new competition.

The new organisation proposed commencing with a new 16-team league competition for the 1987–88 season, that would include the 13 existing teams of the NBL Division 1 along with two promoted teams from Division 2, plus Scottish champions Livingston and a possibility of future expansion into Scotland and Ireland. Some reports also suggested Wales-based Rhondda were approached as a potential addition. Additional proposals for the new league included prize money being awarded to competition winners, a new supplementary League Cup competition for member teams, and the removal of relegation between the new league and NBL Division 2 for the first two seasons, to encourage financial stability for its member teams; promotion would still be offered to the top two teams within Division 2, subject to financial and facility guarantees. Furthermore, all member teams within the Basketball League Limited would be equal shareholders of the new organisation and be eligible to compete in European competitions, whilst the EBBA would retain disciplinary powers, appointment of match officials and remain completely in control of other competitions, such as the National Cup.

Following the conclusion of the 1986–87 season, the EBBA signed a formal agreement with the Basketball League Limited, handing over full control and administration of the top national basketball competition to the new organisation. The agreement was signed at Old Trafford football stadium, home of Manchester United, whose basketball team would feature in the newly formed league. Signing the agreement to establish the new league was Keith Mitchell OBE and Mel Welch, President and Secretary of the EBBA respectively, along with John Deacon, Chairman of the Basketball League Limited, and John Barr, Treasurer of the new organisation.

At official launch, the 16 confirmed teams to feature in the new league were announced as:

- Birmingham
- Bolton & Bury Giants
- Bracknell Tigers
- Brunel Crystal Palace
- Calderdale Explorers
- Derby Rams
- Hemel & Watford Royals
- Kingston
- Leicester City Riders
- Livingston
- Manchester United
- Oldham Celtics
- Portsmouth
- Rhondda
- Solent Stars
- Sunderland 76ers

The new league faced challenges from the off-set when Rhondda – the league's only Wales-based team – folded in August 1987, just weeks before the start of the new season. The sudden loss of a major sponsor meant the team were unable to finance the upcoming campaign, where they would compete against teams with budgets of up to £250,000. London-based Brunel Crystal Palace also faced similar financial challenges during the off-season, searching for additional sponsors to cover their £100,000 outgoings. Despite these setbacks, the fledging organisation did achieve some immediate commercial success; a new 3-year sponsorship agreement with the Carlsberg Group saw the new competition branded as the Carlsberg Basketball League, along with additional naming-rights deals for the postseason playoffs and the Tournament of Champions, both of which were also sponsored by Carlsberg. The newly-established League Cup competition was branded as the NatWest Bank Trophy following a deal with National Westminster Bank.

The EBBA's player import rules – where teams were restricted to having two foreign "import" players plus one "naturalised" British player – were carried over to the new competition. A small complication arose as the league also featured Scotland-based Livingston, and the ruling meant that English players would count as foreign players for teams based in Scotland.

=== Early years and Kingston dominance (1987–1992) ===
The first game of the new Carlsberg Basketball League and the 1987–88 season took place on 13 September 1987, when Scotland-based Livingston defeated Oldham Celtics, 98–81, at the Forum Arena in Livingston. The former Scottish National League team went on to have a very successful season overall. Whilst Portsmouth were successful in retaining their national champions title in the inaugural league championship – continuing their success from the previous National Basketball League – they were soundly defeated by Livingston in both the Playoff Final (81–72) and NatWest Bank Trophy Final (96–91).

=== Early growth (1992–2002) ===
The 1990s also saw a growth in popularity and commercialism within the league. Games were televised and the league picked up sponsors such as Peugeot, Lego, Playboy and Budweiser, while attendances at games also increased. The Manchester Giants opened the 1995–96 season in front of a record 14,251 fans at the Nynex Arena against the London Leopards, a record crowd for a basketball game in Great Britain. It stood until 2006, when the NBA started staging games at the O2 Arena in London.

London clubs dominated the league, with London Towers, Crystal Palace and the Greater London Leopards all sharing success in the mid-1990s. In 1999, a Conference format similar to the NBA was introduced, with clubs split North and South. The two Conference champions met in a Championship series to decide the champions for the next three years.

=== Tougher times (2002–2012) ===
A single division format returned in 2002 and five different franchises won the Championship title in the five years after that. The new millennium, however, also saw a series of setbacks for the BBL. The collapse of ITV Digital cost the league financially, with many franchises struggling to recover from the lost revenue that the £21 million contract was providing. Long established franchises such as the Manchester Giants, Essex Leopards, Derby Storm, Thames Valley Tigers and Birmingham Bullets withdrew from the league, though new teams have been formed under the Giants and Leopards names. The membership crisis brought about the addition of new franchises such as Guildford Heat (formed by supporters of the defunct Thames Valley Tigers), and elected teams from the lower-tier English Basketball League, including the Plymouth Raiders. Both teams made a refreshing impact on the old boys, with the Heat qualifying for the Play-offs in their rookie season.

During the same season Newcastle won 30 of their 40 regular season league fixtures to clinch the Championship crown – the previous season saw the Eagles win 31 matches but lose out to Chester Jets in the final week, by just two points. That title was one of four pieces of silverware won during the dubbed "clean-sweep" season of 2005–06, the Eagles marching on to claim the BBL Cup, BBL Trophy and Playoff's – the complete set.

=== Resurgence and arena builds (2012–2021) ===
The intervening years saw the perennial success of the Newcastle Eagles, the reemergence of the Leicester Riders as a dominant force in the domestic game, and the rise and fall of teams based in London, Birmingham, Liverpool, Essex, Durham and Worthing. Long term franchise Milton Keynes relocated to London, to become a 2012 Olympics legacy tenant at the Copper Box Arena, and a new incarnation of the famous Manchester Giants name re-entered the league in the same year.

The Playoffs Final moved to The O2 Arena in London from 2015 onwards, following a string of sell-out attendances at Wembley Arena between 2012 and 2014. The inaugural event saw a record breaking crowd of 14,700.

Ahead of the 2016–17 BBL season, Italian sportswear manufacturer Kappa agreed a deal to become exclusive kit supplier for all teams, replacing a previous deal with Spalding.

The following decade saw sustained growth across the league, above all with advances in facilities. Some clubs built their own venues, including Newcastle, Leicester, Sheffield and Caledonia, while Manchester, Cheshire and Surrey moved into much improved facilities. While Plymouth, and the final club promoted from the EBL, the Bristol Flyers, announced plans for their own arenas. The 2018–19 season saw, for the first time in 11 years, British participation in European competition when Leicester competed in the Basketball Champions League and FIBA Europe Cup.

== League collapse ==
On 2 December 2021, the Miami-based investment firm 777 Partners bought 45.5% of the shares of the league after its previous purchase of London Lions (basketball). Taking operational control, the company invested £7 million in the league, engineering an organisational reform which included the appointment of a CEO, Aaron Radin.

The move saw a rapid expansion in league employees, investment into the creation of in-house broadcast production, digital media growth, and a number of deals to screen games on television in other countries. The brand of BBL was dropped in favour of 'British Basketball League'.

However regulatory and media investigations into the legitimacy of 777's finances eventually led to the company being wound up in the UK and its founder, Josh Wander, charged with fraud in the United States courts.

With league facing collapse, British Basketball, the then-national governing federation for basketball in the UK, terminated its licence on 14 June 2024, meaning that the UK men's professional league would no longer be operated by the BBL.

British Basketball cited financial concerns as a principal driver of the decision, and took interim measures to ensure that a 2024-25 season took place, leading to the creation of Super League Basketball and its women's counterpart.

== Teams ==
=== Teams (final season) ===
Team	Location	Arena	Capacity	Founded	Joined
Bristol Flyers	(England) Bristol	SGS College Arena	750	2006	2014
Caledonia Gladiators	(Scotland) East Kilbride	Playsport Arena	1,800	1998*	
Cheshire Phoenix	(England) Ellesmere Port	Cheshire Oaks Arena	1,400	1984	1991
Leicester Riders	(England) Leicester	Mattioli Arena	2,400	1967	1987
London Lions	(England) London (Stratford)	Copper Box Arena	6,000	1977*	1987
Manchester Giants	(England) Manchester	National Basketball Centre	2,000	2012	
Newcastle Eagles	(England) Newcastle upon Tyne	Vertu Motors Arena	2,800	1976*	1987
Plymouth City Patriots	(England) Plymouth	Plymouth Pavilions	1,500	2021	
Sheffield Sharks	(England) Sheffield	Canon Medical Arena	2,500	1991	1994
Surrey Scorchers	(England) Guildford	Surrey Sports Park	1,000	2005	

Locations of the 2023–24 BBL teams

Notes

1. An asterisk (*) denotes a franchise move. See the respective team articles for more information.
2. The Hemel & Watford Royals, Leicester City Riders and Sunderland 76ers were all participants in the previous top-flight league, the NBL, when it changed administration to the BBL in 1987.
3. The Cheshire Jets and Sheffield Sharks were both promoted from the NBL in 1991 and 1994 respectively.
4. Bristol Flyers (2014) have acquired a franchise licence to compete in the BBL, having previously competed in the EBL.

=== Expansion teams ===
A number of rounds of expansion took place, commencing in 2014 when the keague admitted two teams, Bristol Flyers and Leeds Carnegie, into the organisation; an ill-fated application from a third team, Edinburgh-based East Scotland Warriors, was rejected at the final stages to concerns over its financial backing. Plymouth City Patriots were admitted into the League for the 2021–22 season as a direct replacement for the Plymouth Raiders, who withdrew prior to the season starting.

Interested parties from Belfast, Birmingham, Cardiff, Dublin, Leeds and Liverpool were cited as having interest in establishing a potential expansion franchise before the BBL's demise. In 2022, media outlets also reported interest from a Birmingham-based consortium which included former NBA star and Hall of Famer, Hakeem Olajuwon, as well as additional interest from the city of Edinburgh and NBL powerhouse Reading Rockets.

== Corporate structure ==
The league was an independent company owned by its member clubs and Miami-based investment firm 777 Partners, who bought 45.5% of the shares of the league, investing £7million, in December 2021. Each club, or franchise, now had an equal shareholding of 5.45%. Prior to 777's investment, he 8-person management board was made up of an independent chairperson, non-affiliated non-executives, Investor Directors and a minority representation of BBL Club Directors. Sir Rodney Walker was its final chairperson prior to its extinction.

=== Chairs ===
- John Deacon (1987 to 1988)
- Kevin Routledge (1988 to 2002)
- Vince Macaulay (2002 to 2006)
- Paul Blake (2006 to 2013)
- Ed Percival (2013 to 2015)
- Sir Rodney Walker (2016 to 2024)

== Competitions ==
=== BBL Championship ===
The BBL Championship was the flagship competition of the British Basketball League and features all member teams playing a double round robin (home and away) league season, generally from September through to April. Matches were played according to FIBA rules and games consist of four-quarters of 10 minutes each. Two points are awarded for a win, with overtime used if the score is tied at the final buzzer – unlimited numbers of 5-minute overtime periods are played until one team is ahead when a period ends.

At the end of the regular season, the team with the most points is crowned as winners of the BBL Championship, and were considered to be British champions. If points were equal between two or more teams, then head-to-head results between said teams are used to determine the winners. In the case of a tie between multiple teams where this does not break the tie, the winners were then determined by the points difference in the games between said teams. Following the completion of the Championship regular season, the top eight ranked teams advanced into the post-season Playoffs which usually take place during April.

In the regular season, team schedules were not identical and neither are matchdays, with games scheduled mainly around venue availability. Because of this teams may find themselves playing a series of four or five home games consecutively followed by a straight set of away games. As the regular season was also particularly short compared to other European nations, many games are played over weekends as 'doubleheaders', whereby a team will play games (possibly a home and away game) on consecutive days.

=== Playoffs ===
The post-season Playoffs usually took place in April and early-May, featuring the top eight ranked teams from the Championship regular season compete in a knockout tournament. Teams were seeded depending on their final positioning in the Championship standings, so first-place faces eighth-place, second versus seventh-place, third against sixth-place and finally fourth plays the fifth-placed team. Both the quarterfinals and the succeeding semifinals are played over a three-game series, with the higher seed getting two home games either side of the lower seeds home game. The team that wins two of the three games advances to the next round. As with the quarterfinals, teams in the Semifinals are also seeded, with the highest-ranking team drawn against the lowest-ranking team in one semifinal and the two remaining teams drawn together in the other semi. The culmination of the post-season was the grand Final, held latterly at The O2 Arena in London, which saw the two semi-final winners play off to determine the Playoff Champions.

=== BBL Cup ===
The BBL Cup emerged from a breakaway of the English Basketball Association-organised National Cup and was contested for the first time in the 2003–04 season, when Sheffield Sharks were the inaugural winners. Since the 2019–20 season, the competition has a group stage followed by a knockout stage. The group stage consisted of the teams being split into north and south groups and within each playing a double round-robin system. The top 4 teams from each group were then seeded with 1st of each group playing 4th in the other and 3rd in each group playing 2nd in the other. The winner of the Aggregate score going through to the semi-final. The winner of the aggregate score of each match in the semi-final then goes through to the BBL Cup Final. The Cup final was most often played at the Arena Birmingham in Birmingham, usually in early January. It was discontinued in 2023 by the league's American management.

=== BBL Trophy ===
The BBL Trophy traced its origins back to a previous competition known as the Anglo-Scottish Cup – and subsequently the British Master's Cup – which was founded in 1984 and was initially a competition between teams from both the English and Scottish leagues. Following the launch of the new British Basketball League administration in 1987 – who assumed control over the National Basketball League from the English Basketball Association – the British Master's Cup was scrapped and replaced with the newly formed League Trophy. The Trophy competition historically had a round-robin group stage format used for the first round, however the competition became a knockout tournament with pairings drawn completely at random – there are no seeds, and a draw takes place after the majority of fixtures have been played in each round. As well as including all BBL member clubs, invited teams from the English Basketball League, and occasionally the Scottish Basketball League, often took part in the Trophy. The Final was usually played in March at a neutral venue.

=== European Competition ===
In 2018, the Leicester Riders competed in Europe's third tier of continental basketball, the Basketball Champions League, losing in the first qualification round on aggregate to the Bakken Bears. They became the first British team to compete in European competition since the Guildford Heat featured in the ULEB Cup during the 2007–08 season.

Following their elimination from the Basketball Champions League, the Leicester Riders played in the 2018–19 FIBA Europe Cup, Europe's fourth tier.

To be eligible for entry into the Basketball Champions League or the FIBA Europe Cup, teams were required play in arenas with a capacity of at least 2,000 people.

== Players ==
=== Import players ===
For most of its history, British Basketball League rules allowed each team to have a maximum of three "import" players – from outside of the European Union (EU) and require a work permit to play – whilst the remaining players on the roster must have citizenship of an EU country, either by birth or by naturalisation. The ruling was integrated at the beginning of the 2006–07 season, reverting from the previous law which allowed for up to four non-EU players on a roster, along with naturalised players.

New rules introduced for the 2012–13 season allowed teams to field a maximum of five non-British players per game (including up to three work permitted players) which the league claimed was a commitment towards developing British players.

=== Salary cap ===
Prior to the 2022–23 season, a "Team Payments Cap" limited teams to spend no more than £250,000 on player salaries per season with the aim of keeping overall costs down for the teams whilst also ensuring competitive balance. The Team Payments Cap was dropped in August 2022 as it was stated to hamper the growth of BBL teams playing in European competitions.

=== Transfer regulations ===
According to BBL rules, teams had to field no more than six import (non-EU) players in any one season, though only three are allowed to be registered to a roster at any one time. Signings were allowed to be made throughout the pre-season and during the regular season until the league's transfer deadline on 28 February, or if during a leap year, the date is 29 February.

=== Notable players ===
Note: Flags indicate national team eligibility at FIBA-sanctioned events. Players may hold other non-FIBA nationalities not displayed.

Criteria

To appear in this section a player must have either:

- Set a club record or won an individual award while at the club
- Played at least one official international match for their national team at any time
- Played at least one official NBA match at any time.

Homegrown

- (United Kingdom) Kieron Achara
- (United Kingdom) John Amaechi
- (United Kingdom) Matthew Bryan-Amaning
- (United Kingdom) Steve Bucknall
- (United Kingdom) Daniel Clark
- (United Kingdom) Dave Gardner
- (United Kingdom) Myles Hesson
- (United Kingdom) Roger Huggins
- (United Kingdom) Colin Irish
- (United Kingdom) Kyle Johnson
- (United Kingdom) Iain MacLean
- (United Kingdom) Richard Midgley
- (United Kingdom) Luke Nelson
- (United Kingdom) Gabe Olaseni
- (United Kingdom) Peter Scantlebury
- (United Kingdom) Ovie Soko
- (United Kingdom) Drew Sullivan

Naturalised British

- (United States) (United Kingdom) Flinder Boyd
- (United States) (United Kingdom) Alton Byrd
- (United States) (United Kingdom) Alan Cunningham
- (United States) (United Kingdom) Tony Dorsey
- (United States) (United Kingdom) Fabulous Flournoy
- (United States) (United Kingdom) Danny Lewis
- (United States) (United Kingdom) Byron Mullens
- (United States) (United Kingdom) Terrell Myers
- (United States) (United Kingdom) Tarik Phillip
- (Saint Kitts) (United Kingdom) Kareem Queeley
- (United States) (United Kingdom) Nate Reinking
- (United States) (United Kingdom) Billy Singleton
- (United States) (United Kingdom) Charles Smith
- (United States) (United Kingdom) Lynard Stewart
- (United States) (United Kingdom) Tony Windless

Rest of the World

- (Antigua and Barbuda) Julius Hodge
- (Canada) Greg Francis
- (Canada) Skouson Harker
- (Dominican Republic) Ricardo Greer
- (Greece) Kosta Koufos
- (Lithuania) Darjuš Lavrinovič
- (Lithuania) Kšyštof Lavrinovič
- (New Zealand) Pero Cameron
- (Nigeria) Miye Oni
- (Nigeria) Olumide Oyedeji
- (United States) Robert Churchwell
- (United States) Charles Claxton
- (United States) Terry Crosby
- (United States) Sam Dekker
- (United States) Richard Dumas
- (United States) Chuck Evans
- (United States) Chris Finch
- (United States) Donte Grantham
- (United States) Kenny Gregory
- (United States) Phil Handy
- (United States) DeAndre Liggins
- (United States) Loren Meyer
- (United States) Dwayne Morton
- (United States) David Nwaba
- (United States) Nick Nurse
- (United States) Craig Robinson
- (United States) Dennis Rodman
- (United States) Andre Smith
- (United States) Jordan Taylor
- (United States) Daryl Thomas
- (United States) Clyde Vaughan
- (United States) Jerry Williams
- (United States) Voise Winters

== Results ==
=== Championship ===
==== Clubs at time of dissolution ====
Club	Champions	Runners-up	Last league title
Newcastle Eagles	7	6	2014–15
Leicester Riders	6	4	2021–22
Sheffield Sharks	4	5	2002–03
London Lions	3	2	2023–24
Cheshire Phoenix (Note: as Cheshire Jets)	2	2	2004–05
Surrey Scorchers (Note: as Guildford Heat)	1	1	2006–07
Caledonia Gladiators (Note: as Scottish Rocks)	0	1	—
Bristol Flyers	—	—	—
Manchester Giants	—	—	—
Plymouth City Patriots	—	—	—

==== Historical ====
Season	Champions	Runners Up	Third Place
1987–88	Portsmouth (1)	Kingston Kings	Murray Livingston
1988–89	Glasgow Rangers (1)	Murray Livingston	Bracknell Tigers
1989–90	Kingston Kings (1)	Manchester Giants	Sunderland 76ers
1990–91	Kingston Kings (2)	Sunderland Saints	Thames Valley Tigers
1991–92	Kingston Kings (3)	Thames Valley Tigers	Worthing Bears
1992–93	Worthing Bears (1)	Thames Valley Tigers	London Towers
1993–94	Thames Valley Tigers (1)	Worthing Bears	Manchester Giants
1994–95	Sheffield Sharks (1)	Thames Valley Tigers	London Towers
1995–96	London Towers (1)	Sheffield Sharks	Birmingham Bullets
1996–97	Leopards (1)	London Towers	Sheffield Sharks
1997–98	Leopards (2)	Birmingham Bullets	Newcastle Eagles
1998–99	Sheffield Sharks (2)	Manchester Giants	London Towers

Season	North Champions	North Runners Up	South Champions	South Runners Up
1999–00	Manchester Giants	Sheffield Sharks	London Towers	Thames Valley Tigers
2000–01	Sheffield Sharks	Chester Jets	London Towers	Greater London Leopards
2001–02	Chester Jets	Sheffield Sharks	London Towers	Brighton Bears

Season	Champions	Runners Up	Third Place
2002–03	Sheffield Sharks (3)	Brighton Bears	Chester Jets
2003–04	Brighton Bears (2)	Sheffield Sharks	London Towers
2004–05	Chester Jets (1)	Newcastle Eagles	London Towers
2005–06	Newcastle Eagles (1)	Scottish Rocks	Sheffield Sharks
2006–07	Guildford Heat (1)	Sheffield Sharks	Newcastle Eagles
2007–08	Newcastle Eagles (2)	Guildford Heat	Plymouth Raiders
2008–09	Newcastle Eagles (3)	Mersey Tigers	Leicester Riders
2009–10	Newcastle Eagles (4)	Sheffield Sharks	Glasgow Rocks
2010–11	Mersey Tigers (1)	Newcastle Eagles	Sheffield Sharks
2011–12	Newcastle Eagles (5)	Leicester Riders	Worcester Wolves
2012–13	Leicester Riders (1)	Newcastle Eagles	Glasgow Rocks
2013–14	Newcastle Eagles (6)	Sheffield Sharks	Worcester Wolves
2014–15	Newcastle Eagles (7)	Leicester Riders	Worcester Wolves
2015–16	Leicester Riders (2)	Newcastle Eagles	Sheffield Sharks
2016–17	Leicester Riders (3)	Newcastle Eagles	Glasgow Rocks
2017–18	Leicester Riders (4)	London Lions	Newcastle Eagles
2018–19	London Lions (1)	Leicester Riders	Newcastle Eagles
2019–20	Season cancelled due to the COVID-19 pandemic		
2020–21	Leicester Riders (5)	London Lions	Plymouth Raiders
2021–22	Leicester Riders (6)	Sheffield Sharks	London Lions
2022–23	London Lions (2)	Leicester Riders	Bristol Flyers
2023–24	London Lions (3)	Cheshire Phoenix	Caledonia Gladiators

=== Playoff Finals ===
Season	Winner	Score	Runners-up	Venue	Most Valuable Player
1987–88	Livingston	81–72	Portsmouth	Wembley Arena	(United Kingdom) Graeme Hill
1988–89	Glasgow Rangers	89–86	Livingston	National Exhibition Centre	(United States) Alan Cunningham
1989–90	Kingston	87–82	Sunderland 76ers	National Exhibition Centre	(United States) Alan Cunningham
1990–91	Kingston	94–72	Sunderland Saints	National Exhibition Centre	(United States) Alton Byrd
1991–92	Kingston	84–67	Thames Valley Tigers	Wembley Arena	(United States) Russ Saunders
1992–93	Worthing Bears	75–74	Thames Valley Tigers	Wembley Arena	(United States) Cleave Lewis
1993–94	Worthing Bears	71–65	Guildford Kings	Wembley Arena	(United States) Colin Irish
1994–95	Worthing Bears	77–73	Manchester Giants	Wembley Arena	(United States) Alan Cunningham
1995–96	Birmingham Bullets	89–72	London Towers	Wembley Arena	(United States) Tony Dorsey
1996–97	London Towers	89–88	Leopards	Wembley Arena	(United States) Keith Robinson
1997–98	Birmingham Bullets	78–75	Thames Valley Tigers	Wembley Arena	(United States) Tony Dorsey
1998–99	London Towers	82–71	Thames Valley Tigers	Wembley Arena	(United States) Danny Lewis
1999–00	Manchester Giants	74–65	Birmingham Bullets	Wembley Arena	(United States) Tony Dorsey
2000–01	Leicester Riders	84–75	Chester Jets	Wembley Arena	(United States) Larry Johnson
2001–02	Chester Jets	93–82	Sheffield Sharks	Wembley Arena	(United States) John McCord
2002–03	Scottish Rocks	83–76	Brighton Bears	National Indoor Arena	(Trinidad and Tobago) Shawn Myers
2003–04	Sheffield Sharks	86–74	Chester Jets	National Indoor Arena	(United States) Lynard Stewart
2004–05	Newcastle Eagles	78–75	Chester Jets	National Indoor Arena	(United Kingdom) Drew Sullivan
2005–06	Newcastle Eagles	83–68	Scottish Rocks	National Indoor Arena	(United States) Fabulous Flournoy
2006–07	Newcastle Eagles	95–82	Scottish Rocks	Metro Radio Arena	(United Kingdom) Olu Babalola
2007–08	Guildford Heat	100–88	Milton Keynes Lions	National Indoor Arena	(United States) Daniel Gilbert
2008–09	Newcastle Eagles	87–84	Everton Tigers	National Indoor Arena	(United States) Trey Moore
2009–10	Everton Tigers	80–72	Glasgow Rocks	National Indoor Arena	(United States) Kevin Bell
2010–11	Mersey Tigers	79–74	Sheffield Sharks	National Indoor Arena	(United Kingdom) James Jones
2011–12	Newcastle Eagles	71–62	Leicester Riders	National Indoor Arena	(United States) Charles Smith
2012–13	Leicester Riders	68–57	Newcastle Eagles	Wembley Arena	(United States) Jay Cousinard
2013–14	Worcester Wolves	90–78	Newcastle Eagles	Wembley Arena	(United States) Zaire Taylor
2014–15	Newcastle Eagles	96–84	London Lions	O2 Arena	(United States) Rahmon Fletcher
2015–16	Sheffield Sharks	84–74	Leicester Riders	O2 Arena	(Canada) Mike Tuck
2016–17	Leicester Riders	84–63	Newcastle Eagles	O2 Arena	(Sweden) Pierre Hampton
2017–18	Leicester Riders	81–60	London Lions	O2 Arena	(United States) TrayVonn Wright
2018–19	Leicester Riders	93–61	London City Royals	O2 Arena	(United States) Timothy Williams
2020–21	Newcastle Eagles	68–66	London Lions	Morningside Arena	(United States) Cortez Edwards
2021–22	Leicester Riders	78–75	London Lions	O2 Arena	(United States) Geno Crandall
2022–23	London Lions	88–80	Leicester Riders	O2 Arena	(United States) Jordan Taylor
2023–24	London Lions	88–85	Cheshire Phoenix	O2 Arena	(United States) Sam Dekker

=== Honours board ===
Rank	Team	Wins	RU	Wins	RU	Wins	RU	Wins	RU	Wins	RU
Rank	Team	BBL Championship		BBL Playoffs		BBL Cup		BBL Trophy		Total	
1	Newcastle Eagles	7	6	7	5	7	4	7	4	28	19
2	Leicester Riders	6	4	6	3	4	5	3	4	19	16
3	Guildford Kings^{†}	4	1	4	1	4	0	3	1	15	3
4	Sheffield Sharks	4	6	2	3	6	2	2	2	14	13
5	Cheshire Phoenix	2	2	1	3	2	2	6	3	11	10
6	London Towers^{†}	4	1	2	1	1	1	3	2	10	5
7	London Lions	3	2	2	5	3	1	1	4	9	12
8	Brighton Bears^{†}	2	3	3	1	3	1	0	3	8	8
9	Thames Valley Tigers^{†}	1	4	0	4	2	3	4	0	7	11
10	Mersey Tigers^{†}	1	1	2	1	1	1	1	0	5	3
11	Surrey Scorchers	1	1	1	0	1	0	1	2	4	3
12	Manchester Giants^{†}	1	2	1	1	0	2	1	4	3	9
13	Essex Leopards^{†}	2	1	0	1	2	0	0	0	3	4
14	Worcester Wolves^{†}	0	0	1	0	1	1	1	0	3	1
15	Caledonia Gladiators	0	1	1	3	0	4	1	1	2	9
16	Livingston^{†}	0	1	1	0	0	0	1	1	2	3
17	Birmingham Bullets^{†}	0	1	2	1	0	1	0	0	2	3
18	Plymouth Raiders^{†}	0	0	0	0	0	2	1	3	1	5
19	Portsmouth^{†}	1	0	0	1	0	1	0	0	1	3
20	London City Royals^{†}	0	0	0	1	0	0	1	0	1	1
21	Derby Storm^{†}	0	0	0	0	0	0	0	1	0	1
22	Solent Kestrels	0	0	0	0	0	0	0	1	0	1
23	Bristol Flyers	0	0	0	0	0	1	0	0	0	1
24	Manchester Giants	0	0	0	0	0	1	0	0	0	1

*Note: † Defunct club.

*Note: This is a ranking of all BBL clubs titles won both throughout BBL history and including pre-BBL titles.

*Note: Manchester Giants refers to the first franchise with this name rather than the current franchise of the same name.

Source: Honours board

== Media coverage ==
Basketball receives little national press coverage in the United Kingdom, although coverage is more extensive from the local newspapers in cities where BBL clubs are based, with publications such as The Plymouth Herald, Manchester Evening News, Leicester Mercury and the Newcastle Chronicle all having dedicated basketball reporters who cover the respective local team. Some national newspapers listed results and occasionally provide short summaries of the League's news, but more extensive coverage remains minimal.

The history of television coverage of the BBL was sporadic. Initially, the League enjoyed coverage from Channel 4 in the 1980s and Sky Sports from 1995 to 2001, where audiences peaked at around 150,000 viewers. The League signed a three-year broadcast deal with the ill-fated digital TV company ITV Digital in 2001, and coverage suffered a sharp decline as the broadcaster struggled and eventually went out of business, resulting in a significant loss of income to member clubs. Television coverage was then infrequent until the 2007–08 season, when international broadcaster Setanta Sports signed a deal to screen one live game a week. In 2010, the League agreed a broadcast rights deal with Sky Sports, marking the return of BBL action on Sky Sports after a 9-year gap. The League's own subscription-based online TV station, BBL TV, took over the broadcast of live games from 2013 to 2015, and during the 2013–14 season match highlights were also televised and featured on British Eurosport each week.

In July 2016, the league signed a two-year broadcast deal with the BBC, featuring both British Basketball League and Women's British Basketball League games. The games would be broadcast on the BBC Sport website with the showpiece finals also being broadcast on the BBC Red Button. Alongside the BBC deal, a six-year deal with Perform was signed which saw every BBL game broadcast via LiveBasketball.TV, and a deal followed a year later with UNILAD to broadcast one game a week live via Facebook. FreeSports signed a deal with the league in January 2018 to broadcast games for the remainder of the season, starting with the BBL Cup Final between Worcester Wolves and Cheshire Phoenix.

In November 2020, coverage of the league returned to Sky Sports in a new two-year deal which sees Sky broadcasting 30 games per season, including BBL Trophy Final, BBL Cup Final and BBL Playoffs. This was later extended to also cover the 2022-23 season.

During the concluding 2023–24 season of the BBL, DAZN took over as UK broadcaster while NESN aired BBL matches in the US.

== Awards ==
- Most Valuable Player award
- Coach of the Year award
- All-Star Team award

== See also ==
- Basketball in England
- National Basketball League (England)
- Super League Basketball
- Super League (Ireland), featuring teams from Northern Ireland and the Republic of Ireland
- Women's British Basketball League
- List of professional sports teams in the United Kingdom
- Timeline of basketball on UK television
