= Voise Winters =

American basketball player (born 1962)

Personal information
- Born: October 12, 1962 (age 64) Chicago, Illinois, U.S.
- Listed height: 6 ft 8 in (2.03 m)
- Listed weight: 200 lb (91 kg)

Career information
- High school: Gage Park (Chicago, Illinois)
- College: Bradley (1981–1985)
- NBA draft: 1985: 2nd round, 44th overall pick
- Drafted by: Philadelphia 76ers
- Playing career: 1985–2001
- Position: Small forward
- Number: 11

Career history
- 1985: Philadelphia 76ers
- 1985–1986: JDA Dijon
- 1986–1987: CB Girona
- 1987–1988: ALM Évreux Basket
- 1988–1989: Cajahuelva
- 1989–1991: Tours Basket
- 1991: DYC Breogán
- 1992–1993: Caen Basket
- 1993–1994: BCM Gravelines
- 1994: Hapoel Tzfat
- 1994–1995: Fribourg Olympic
- 1995–1996: Oyak Renault
- 1996: Élan Chalon
- 1996–1997: Sheffield Sharks
- 1998: Le Mans
- 1998–2000: TAU Cerámica
- 2000: Cáceres CB
- 2001: Ourense

Career highlights
- First-team All-MVC (1985)
- Stats at NBA.com
- Stats at Basketball Reference

Voise Lee Winters (born October 12, 1962) is an American former basketball player. He played for the Philadelphia 76ers of the National Basketball Association (NBA).

During his senior season (1980–81) at Gage Park High School in Chicago, Winters set an Illinois high school season scoring record which still stands: he averaged 46.7 points per game. His grand total of 1,048 points was also a record at the time, but several other players have since amassed higher totals.

He played college basketball for Bradley University from 1981 to 1985. In his college career, he scored 1,714 points. After the close of his college career, Winters was drafted by the Philadelphia 76ers of the NBA in the second round of the 1985 NBA draft (44th pick overall). He appeared in 4 games for the 76ers in the 1985–86 season, averaging 1.5 points per game.

After leaving the Sixers, Winters had an extensive career in Europe, playing for 18 different teams, mainly in France, Spain and Great Britain. He now coaches Basketball and other invasion games at Ashville College, Harrogate, United Kingdom.

== Career statistics ==
Legend
GP	Games played	GS	Games started	MPG	Minutes per game
FG%	Field goal percentage	3P%	3-point field goal percentage	FT%	Free throw percentage
RPG	Rebounds per game	APG	Assists per game	SPG	Steals per game
BPG	Blocks per game	PPG	Points per game	**Bold**	Career high

=== NBA ===
==== Regular season ====
Year	Team	GP	GS	MPG	FG%	3P%	FT%	RPG	APG	SPG	BPG	PPG
1985–86	Philadelphia	4	0	4.3	.231	.000	–	.8	.0	.3	.0	1.5
