= Roger Huggins =

British basketball player (born 1967)

Personal information
- Born: 5 September 1967 (age 58) London, England
- Listed height: 2.00 m (6 ft 7 in)

Career information
- College: Hawaii Pacific (1988–1993)
- NBA draft: 1993: undrafted
- Playing career: 1986–2008
- Position: Power forward / center

Career history
- 1986–1988: Bracknell Pirates
- 1993–1994: Bobcat Gent
- 1994–1997: Sheffield Sharks
- 1997–2000: Racing Basket Antwerpen
- 2000–2001: Athlon Ieper
- 2001: Hapoel Jerusalem
- 2001–2003: Spirou Charleroi
- 2003–2004: Liège Basket
- 2004–2005: Bnei HaSharon
- 2005–2006: Euphony Bree
- 2006–2007: Liège Basket
- 2007: Spirou Charleroi
- 2007–2008: Dexia Mons-Hainaut

Career highlights
- BBL MVP (1995); 2× EBBA Player of the Year (1995, 1999)

Roger Huggins (born 5 September 1967 in London, England) is a British former professional basketball player, notable for earning more than 90 international caps with the England national team and Great Britain national team.

== Playing career ==
A 6ft7 forward, he started his career with Bracknell Pirates in 1986, where he spent two years before moving to the United States in 1988 to go to college at Hawaii Pacific University, where he was honoured as an All-American in 1993 by the NAIA. Following graduation in 1993, he unsuccessfully tried out for a career in the NBA and the Seattle SuperSonics before signing with Belgian team Gent for the 199–94 season. After one season, Huggins returned to England to sign for British Basketball League rookies Sheffield Sharks in their first season in the premier division, winning both the Championship and the National Cup, whilst Huggins himself was named as the League's Most Valuable Player and the English Basketball Association's Player of the Year for 1995. Two more successful seasons, including three consecutive appearances in the All-Star team (1995, 1996 and 1997), were spent at Sheffield where Huggins assured himself of a position as one of the most popular British players of all time.

In 1997 Huggins returned to Belgium, signing for Antwerp Giants, where he spent three seasons, including appearing in the Korać Cup. In 1999, he was awarded the English Basketball Association's Player of the Year for the second time. In his final season with Antwerp (1999-00), Huggins averaged 14.9 points-per-game in 23 appearances, whilst raising it to 16.6 points-per-game in 8 appearances in the Korać Cup. During his three seasons at Antwerp, he was also honoured on the Belgian League's All-Star team for 1998, 1999 and 2000. In 2000, Huggins moved to Athlon Ieper where he had an average of 17.7 points-per-game in 24 appearances, before moving to Israeli club Hapoel Jerusalem during the spring of 2001 for the remainder of the season. Huggins played only 11 games in Jerusalem, but quickly became a fan favourite as he played an instrumental role in an upset of Maccabi Tel Aviv on his debut. He averaged 15.3 points and 5.7 rebounds over 28 minutes in seven playoff games that year as Jerusalem reached the Play-off finals. The following season Huggins returned to Belgium and moved to Spirou Charleroi who were competing in Europe's elite competition, the Euroleague, where he averaged a respectable 13.1 points-per-game over 29:49 minutes-per-game.

Huggins' second season at Spirou was just as prominent and he averaged 9.3 points in 30 games domestically and 9.1 points in 11 games in the ULEB Cup. In 2003 he signed for Euphony Liège scoring 11 points-per-game in 40 games and in 2004 he returned to Israel to sign with Bnei HaSharon who were appearing in the FIBA Europe League. Huggins featured heavily in the Group stage, averaging 10.9 points in 12 games, but halfway through the season he returned to Belgium to sign for former Sheffield teammate Chris Finch's side Euphony Bree. Two successful season's at Bree followed, including winning the Belgian League title in 2005, before Huggins returning to Liège and Spirou in 2006 before being reunited with Coach Finch at Dexia Mons-Hainaut along with fellow Great Britain national team players Nate Reinking, Andrew Sullivan and Mike Lenzly for the 2007–08 season. Mons enjoyed an incredibly successful season in European competition and finished as Runners-up in the FIBA EuroCup, losing to Latvian team Barons LMT 63–62 in the final. Huggins featured for only 4 minutes in the final but averaged 7 points-per-game over the season in the EuroCup. Huggins retired from basketball in 2008, having previously retired from international basketball in 2007, having helped Great Britain win promotion to Division A.
