= Tony Dorsey =

American basketball player (born 1970)

Personal information
- Born: 15 July 1970 (age 56) Atlanta, Georgia, U.S.
- Listed height: 6 ft 7 in (2.01 m)
- Listed weight: 220 lb (100 kg)

Career information
- College: North Alabama (1988–1992)
- NBA draft: 1992: undrafted
- Playing career: 1994–2009
- Position: Power forward / center

Career history
- 1994–1996: Birmingham Bullets
- 1996: Steiner Bayreuth
- 1996–1998: Birmingham Bullets
- 1998–2000: Manchester Giants
- 2000–2001: Hapoel Jerusalem
- 2001–2002: Cholet Basket
- 2002–2005: Telindus Oostende
- 2005: Eurorida Scafati
- 2005–2006: Fileni Bpa Jesi
- 2006–2007: Newcastle Eagles
- 2007–2008: Guildford Heat
- 2008–2009: Everton Tigers
- 2009: Liverpool Basketball Club

Career highlights
- French League Best Scorer (2002); NCAA Division II champion (1991)

Anthony Jerald Dorsey (born 15 July 1970) is an American-born British former professional basketball player. He was born in Atlanta, Georgia. At a height of 6 ft 7 in (2.01 m), and a weight of 220 pounds (100 kg), he played at the power forward and center positions. He was the French League Best Scorer, in 2002.

== College career ==
Dorsey attended and played college basketball at the University of North Alabama, with the North Alabama Lions, where he won the 1990–91 NCAA Division II Championship.

== Professional career ==
Dorsey had spells in the Dominican Republic (with San Martin) and with his hometown USBL team the Atlanta Trojans, before signing for British professional outfit Birmingham Bullets in 1994, which was to start his love-affair with the British hoops scene.

Dorsey made his debut for the Bullets on 9 September 1994, when the Sheffield Sharks were the visitors. In his first season Dorsey played 24 games for the Midlanders, averaging an impressive 21.8 points-per-game, a total of 525 points for his rookie season. Tony could only get better and his second season, (1995–96) saw him score an amazing 1008 points in 36 games (Which stands as the second-highest single season scoring mark in the BBL in the past 12 years), an incredible average of 28 points per game, which resulted in picking up BBL Player of the Year award for that season as well as being named in the All-Star team, not to forget winning the Championship final with the Bullets.

Dorsey joined the Manchester Giants in 1998 and won the Championship, Trophy and Play-off titles with them in two seasons. On 17 November 2006, Dorsey signed for the Newcastle Eagles signalling a return to the British Basketball League. He made his debut for the Eagles on 19 November 2006 in an 81–75 defeat away to Plymouth Raiders, where he scored 12 points in 21 minutes of play, picking up 10 rebounds.

After just one season in Newcastle, it was officially announced on 1 August 2007, that Dorsey had penned a contract with Eagles' title rivals Guildford Heat for the one season, in which they played in the EuroCup. After just one year with the Heat, Dorsey joined the Everton Tigers in 2008, with Heat teammate James Jones.

== National team career ==
Dorsey is a naturalised British citizen, and played in 15 games with the senior English national basketball team, scoring 193 points.
