= Todd Cauthorn =

American-British basketball player

Personal information
- Born: May 28, 1971 (age 55) Roanoke, Virginia
- Listed height: 6 ft 8 in (2.03 m)

Career information
- College: William & Mary (1989–1993)
- NBA draft: 1993: undrafted
- Playing career: 1993–2010
- Position: Power forward / center

Career history

Playing
- 1993–1994: ABC Graz
- 1994–2000: Sheffield Sharks
- 2000–2001: Euphony Bree
- 2001–2002: Sheffield Sharks
- 2002–2003: Chester Jets
- 2003–2005: Sheffield Arrows
- 2005–2007, 2009–2010: Sheffield Sharks

Coaching
- 2005–2010: Sheffield Sharks (assistant)

Career highlights
- BBL champion (2003); BBL Cup Championship (2010); Sheffield retired jersey (2011)

Todd Cauthorn (born May 28, 1971) is a retired American-British professional basketball player.

After attending the College of William & Mary, Cauthorn moved to Europe in 1993, signing for Austrian club ABC Graz. After just one season on the continent, Cauthorn transferred to the newly promoted BBL franchise Sheffield Sharks, thus starting a love affair with the Steel City club that would span well over a decade.

Cauthorn made his debut for the Sharks on September 17, 1994 against the visiting Sunderland Scorpions, and played for Sheffield until 2000 when he transferred to Euphony Bree of Belgium. However, after just one season back in Europe, he was back in Sheffield and resigned for the 2001–02 season. The following year, Todd moved west to sign for rival club Chester Jets, before moving back to Sheffield to play for English Basketball League side Sheffield Arrows, the former development team of the Sharks.

Todd rejoined the Sharks for a third spell in 2005, and after two more years at the club, he announced his retirement from the professional game at the end of the 2006–2007 season. In 2009, Cauthorn came out of retirement to sign for the Sharks once again. In September 2010 he again announced his retirement.
