= Coventry Crusaders =

- League: EBL Division 1 (At time of closing)
- Established: 1987
- Folded: 2011
- History: Sportsworld Market Harborough; 1987-1988; Corby Flyers; 1988-1990; Coventry Flyers; 1990-1992; Coventry Crusaders; 1992-2011
- Arena: Coventry Sports & Leisure Centre
- Location: Coventry, West Midlands
- Team colours: Blue, Green, Gold and White
- Head coach: (United Kingdom) Roger Payne
- Ownership: Robert Donaldson
- Website: Crusaders.co.uk
Home	Away	Third

The Coventry Crusaders were a Coventry-based basketball team competing in Division 1 of the English Basketball League at the time of the club's closure. The team played their home games at the Coventry Sports & Leisure Centre, and their home colours were blue with green sides, and their road uniform consisted of mainly white with blue sides. The club also operated The Crusader Foundation, a charity arm with the aim of using basketball as a vehicle to reach out to young people.

== Franchise history ==
=== Early years ===
Founded as Sportsworld Market Harborough in 1987, the club were nomadic during their formative years, only remaining in their original venue for a year before relocating to Corby, and then moving to Coventry after a further two years. Stability started to come to the club in the 1992/1993 season when they re-branded as the Crusaders, with Rob Bromfield as coach and Dip Donaldson – who would go on to own the club in future years - as captain. The following year the team would go on to win the league title and play-off title, with a series of runner-up and third-place finishes to follow in the years thereafter. After this initial period of success, the club settled into a steady pattern of mid-table finishes for a number of years, only dropping out of the top tier briefly for the 2003/2004 season when the league was restructured into the English Basketball League, and bouncing back into the top flight at the first attempt.

=== British Basketball Association ===
Seeking the next step for the long-established franchise, Dip Donaldson formally announced on 15 January 2007 that the Coventry Crusaders had accepted an invitation to join the proposed British Basketball Association professional league, making them the first team make such a commitment. While this would have ended the club's long association with the English Basketball League, the chance to realize their long-held ambition to become a fully professional team was too good to ignore. The British Basketball Association was due to commence operations in November 2007, but the league never materialised and the Crusaders renewed their application with EBL Division 1 for the 2007/08 season.

=== Decline & Demise ===
Despite the disappointment of the new league failing to appear, the club underwent a major transition the following year, with former player Scott Neely taking over as Head Coach, and almost a complete changeover in the playing roster. However, the changes failed to revive the club's fortunes, with the team finishing 6th and 10th in Division One for the 2008/2009 and 2009/2010 seasons respectively. More changes took place at the top for 2010/2011, with Roger Payne taking the reins both on and off the court in the dual role of Head Coach and General Manager. The promised bright new dawn never came though, with sponsorship and investment hard to come by in a tough recession climate, leaving Payne to personally bankroll the Division One team. After months of struggle, the club were forced to pull out of the league mid-season, without the funds to complete their fixture list. Although there were plans to re-launch the club in Division Four for the 2011/2012 season, these never came to fruition and the club have remained inactive since.
