= Essex Leopards (1994–2003) =

- League: BBL
- Established: 1994
- Folded: 2003
- History: Leopards; 1994-1997; Greater London Leopards; 1997-2002; Essex Leopards; 2002-2003
- Arena: Brentwood Centre
- Location: Brentwood, Essex
- Team colours: Teal, Black and White

The Essex Leopards, or just Leopards as they were more commonly known, was a British basketball team competing in the British Basketball League. Established in 1994, the Leopards franchise was one of the most successful teams of the 1990s, dominating the domestic scene with local rivals London Towers.

Originally playing out of the London Arena as Leopards and later Greater London Leopards, the team was moved to Brentwood in 1999, and in 2002 the name was changed to the Essex Leopards. For financial reasons the team decided to "sit out" the 2003–04 season of the BBL and while every effort was made to find a buyer for the franchise, the Leopards soon folded completely.

== Season-by-season records ==
Season	Division	Tier	Regular Season						Post-Season	Trophy	Cup	Head coach
Season	Division	Tier	Finish	Played	Wins	Losses	Points	Win %	Post-Season	Trophy	Cup	Head coach
Leopards
1994-95	BBL	1	6th	36	23	13	46	0.638	Quarter-finals	Pool Stage	Semi-finals	Billy Mims
1995-96	BBL	1	4th	36	23	13	46	0.638	Quarter-finals	Pool Stage	Quarter-finals	Billy Mims
1996-97	BBL	1	1st	36	28	8	56	0.777	Runners Up	Quarter-finals	Winners, beating Sheffield	Billy Mims
Greater London Leopards
1997-98	BBL	1	1st	36	29	7	58	0.806	Quarter-finals	Semi-finals	Quarter-finals	Billy Mims
1998-99	BBL	1	8th	36	19	17	38	0.527	Quarter-finals	Pool Stage	Runners Up	Billy Mims
1999-00	BBL S	1	5th	34	11	23	22	0.323	Did not qualify	Quarter-finals	Quarter-finals	Bob Donewald
2000-01	BBL S	1	2nd	34	24	10	48	0.705	Semi-finals	Quarter-finals	Runners Up	Bob Donewald
2001-02	BBL S	1	4th	32	16	16	32	0.500	1st round	Semi-finals	Last 16	Chris Pullem
Essex Leopards
2002-03	BBL	1	10th	40	11	29	22	0.275	Did not qualify	Pool Stage	Quarter-finals	Mike Taylor

== New team ==
This was not the end though, as in 2004 a merger took place between Ware Rebels and Leopards Alive (an organisation of supporters of the defunct Greater London Leopards), and renamed as the Essex & Herts Leopards. In 2006, the team was renamed again to London Leopards, and currently play in EBL Division 1, the league below the BBL.

== See also ==
- Essex Leopards
