= Danny Lewis (basketball) =

American-English basketball player

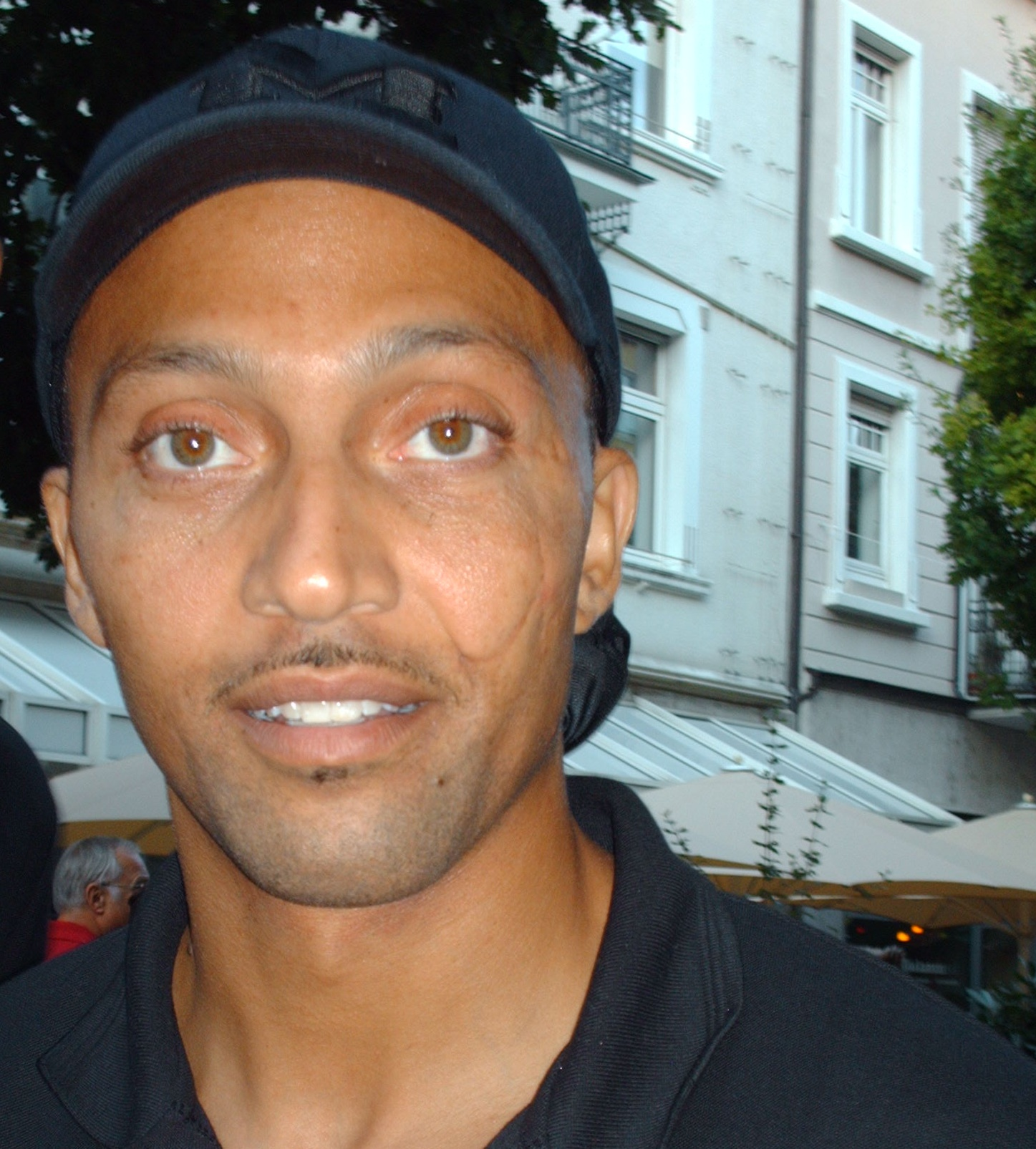

Personal information
- Born: June 21, 1970 (age 56) Kalamazoo, Michigan, U.S.
- Listed height: 6 ft 1 in (1.85 m)
- Listed weight: 185 lb (84 kg)

Career information
- High school: Kalamazoo Central High School
- College: Wayne State University
- Position: Point guard

Career highlights
- Israeli Basketball Premier League Quintet (2001–02)

Danny Lewis (born June 21, 1970) is an American-English former basketball player. He played the point guard position. In 2001–02 he was named to the Israeli Basketball Premier League Quintet.

== Biography ==
Lewis is from Kalamazoo, Michigan. He is a nephew of former NBA player Reggie Lewis, who played for the Boston Celtics. He also became a British citizen in 2000. Lewis is 6 ft 1 in (185 cm) tall, and weighs 185 pounds (84 kg).

He attended and played basketball for Kalamazoo Central High School. In 1988 Lewis was All-City, All-League, and All-State.

Lewis then attended and played basketball for Wayne State University ('93) in Michigan. In 1991–92 he was Second Team All-Great Lakes Intercollegiate Athletic Conference. In a game in January 1993 he set a school record with seven steals, and in a game in February 1993 he set a school record with 13 three-pointers made. In 1992–93 he was First Team All-GLIAC, and named to the 1993 NCAA Division II men's basketball tournament Team. As of 2006 he was fifth in school history in scoring average (18.1 points per game). In 2006 the Wayne State Athletic Department named him one of the top 30 men's basketball players in school history.

He played for a number of European teams, including London Towers (England), Leche Rio Breogan Lugo and Aqua Palma Magica (Spain), Lokomotiv Rostov (Russia), and in Poland.

Lewis also played for Ironi Ramat Gan in the Israel Basketball Premier League in 2001–02. In 2001–02 he was named to the Israeli Basketball Premier League Quintet.
