= 2021–22 Plymouth City Patriots season =

British Basketball Team

- Head coach: (United Kingdom) Paul James
- Captain: (Albania) Elvisi Dusha
- Arena: Plymouth Pavilions

BBL results
- Record: 12–15 (.444)
- Ladder: 8th
- BBL Cup: Group stage
- BBL Trophy: Quarter-finalist
- Playoff finish: Quarter-finalist
- Biggest win: Plymouth 113–66 Wales (9 January 2022)
- Biggest defeat: Cheshire 120–69 Plymouth (8 December 2021)
- Stats at BBL.org.uk

Player records
- Points: (United Kingdom) Kofi Josephs 20.8
- Rebounds: (United States) Rashad Hassan 7.4
- Assists: (United States) Antonio Williams 8.3
- All statistics correct as of 2 May 2022.

The 2021–22 Plymouth City Patriots season was the first season of the franchise and the team's first appearance in the British Basketball League (BBL).

It was the first season under head coach Paul James.

== Players ==
=== Squad information ===
Note: Flags indicate national team eligibility at FIBA-sanctioned events. Players may hold other non-FIBA nationalities not displayed.

Plymouth City Patriots roster
Players
Coaches

| Pos. | No. | Nat. | Name | Ht. | Wt. | Age |
|---|---|---|---|---|---|---|
| PF | 0 | (United Kingdom) | King, Cameron | 2.06 m (6 ft 9 in) | 90 kg (198 lb) | 30 – 17 January 1996 |
| C | 4 | (United Kingdom) | Adekunle, Deji | 2.08 m (6 ft 10 in) | 104 kg (229 lb) | 34 – 4 June 1992 |
| G | 5 | (United Kingdom) | Fawell-Molloy, Daniel (TW) | 1.93 m (6 ft 4 in) | 82 kg (181 lb) | 25 – 20 July 2001 |
| PG | 6 | (United States) | Williams, Antonio | 1.83 m (6 ft 0 in) | 84 kg (185 lb) | 29 – 12 January 1997 |
| SG | 9 | (United States) | Simons, Troy | 1.91 m (6 ft 3 in) | 87 kg (192 lb) | 30 – 3 July 1996 |
| G | 10 | (United Kingdom) | Ubiaro, Denzel | 1.91 m (6 ft 3 in) | 86 kg (190 lb) | 29 – 18 March 1997 |
| SF | 11 | (United Kingdom) | Walker, Isaiah (TW) | 2.01 m (6 ft 7 in) | 89 kg (196 lb) | 27 – 17 June 1999 |
| PG | 12 | (Albania) | Dusha, Elvisi (C) | 1.88 m (6 ft 2 in) | 89 kg (196 lb) | 32 – 15 July 1994 |
| G/F | 13 | (United Kingdom) | Hart, Joseph | 1.96 m (6 ft 5 in) | 93 kg (205 lb) | 32 – 6 October 1993 |
| SF | 17 | (United Kingdom) | Langridge-Barker, Liam (TW) | 1.98 m (6 ft 6 in) | 89 kg (196 lb) | 27 – 12 April 1999 |
| SF | 21 | (United Kingdom) | Graham-Bell, Rowell | 1.98 m (6 ft 6 in) | 97 kg (214 lb) | 32 – 8 August 1994 |
| F/C | 22 | (United States) | Hassan, Rashad | 2.03 m (6 ft 8 in) | 98 kg (216 lb) | 37 – 23 September 1989 |

Head coach

- (United Kingdom) Paul James

Assistant coach(es)

- None

Legend

- (C) Team captain
- (TW) Two-way affiliate player with
  Plymouth Marjon University
- Injured

- Roster
Updated: 3 April 2022

=== Depth chart ===
| Pos. | Starting 5 | Bench 1 | Bench 2 |
|---|---|---|---|
| C | Rashad Hassan | Deji Adekunle |
| PF | Joseph Hart | Cameron King |
| SF | Rowell Graham-Bell | Isaiah Walker | Liam Langridge-Barker |
| SG | Troy Simons | Denzel Ubiaro | Daniel Fawell-Molloy |
| PG | Antonio Williams | Elvisi Dusha |

=== Transactions ===
==== In ====
| No. | Pos. | Nat. | Name | Age | Moving from | | Date | Source |
|---|---|---|---|---|---|---|---|---|
| 10 | G | (United Kingdom) | Denzel Ubiaro | 24 | Plymouth Raiders | (United Kingdom) | 27 August 2021 | |
| 22 | C | (United Kingdom) | Kingsley Okoroh | 26 | London Lions | (United Kingdom) | 2 September 2021 | |
| 7 | SG | (United Kingdom) | Liam Carpenter | 25 | Lokomotive Bernau | (Germany) | 6 September 2021 | |
| 0 | PF | (United Kingdom) | Cameron King | 25 | Quintanar | (Spain) | 6 September 2021 | |
| 13 | G/F | (United Kingdom) | Joseph Hart | 27 | SBB Wolmirstedt | (Germany) | 8 September 2021 | |
| 1 | PF | (United States) | Shawn Shelton | 26 | Culleredo | (Spain) | 8 September 2021 | |
| 12 | PG | (Albania) | Elvisi Dusha | 27 | Plymouth Raiders | (United Kingdom) | 13 September 2021 | |
| 4 | C | (United Kingdom) | Deji Adekunle | 29 | Oaklands Wolves | (United Kingdom) | 2 October 2021 | |
| 1 | SG | (United Kingdom) | Kofi Josephs | 30 | Free agent | (United Kingdom) | 4 November 2021 | |
| 21 | SF | (United Kingdom) | Rowell Graham-Bell | 27 | Basketball Löwen Erfurt | (Germany) | 4 November 2021 | |
| 6 | PG | (United States) | Antonio Williams | 24 | Ottawa BlackJacks | (Canada) | 16 December 2021 | |
| 22 | F/C | (United States) | Rashad Hassan | 32 | Free agent | (United States) | 17 December 2021 | |
| 9 | SG | (United States) | Troy Simons | 25 | Kharkivski Sokoly | (Ukraine) | 1 March 2022 | |

==== Out ====
| No. | Pos. | Nat. | Name | Age | Moving to | | Date | Source |
|---|---|---|---|---|---|---|---|---|
| 1 | PF | (United States) | Shawn Shelton | 26 | Free agent | (United States) | 3 November 2021 | |
| 7 | SG | (United Kingdom) | Liam Carpenter | 25 | Free agent | (United Kingdom) | 10 December 2021 | |
| 22 | C | (United Kingdom) | Kingsley Okoroh | 26 | Free agent | (United Kingdom) | 10 December 2021 | |
| 1 | SG | (United Kingdom) | Kofi Josephs | 30 | Free agent | (United Kingdom) | 2 March 2022 | |

== Pre-season and friendlies ==
=== Friendly matches ===
| 29 December 2021 | Plymouth City Patriots | 101–92(OT) | Bristol Flyers | Plymouth |
| 19:00 | Scoring by quarter: 28–26, 21–20, 15–25, 24–17, Overtime: 13–4 |
| | Pts: Hassan 35; Rebs: Hassan 8 Asts: Dusha, Williams 7 | Boxscore | Pts: Jacob 26; Rebs: Jacob 10; Asts: Jacob 7 | Arena: Plymouth Pavilions; Attendance: 500; Referees: Darren Bolt, Tahir Akar, Andrew Thackray |
Note: Exhibition game

== Competitions ==
| Competition | First match | Last match | Starting round | Final position | Record | | | | | | | |
| Competition | First match | Last match | Starting round | Final position | Pld | W | D | L | PF | PA | PD | Win % |
|---|---|---|---|---|---|---|---|---|---|---|---|---|
| BBL Championship | 9 November 2021 | 24 April 2022 | Round 1 | 8th | 27 | 12 | 0 | 15 | 2,176 | 2,319 | −143 | 44.44 |
| BBL Cup | 25 September 2021 | 27 October 2021 | Group stage | Group stage | 8 | 0 | 0 | 8 | 513 | 693 | −180 | 0.00 |
| BBL Trophy | 17 February 2022 | 20 February 2022 | Round 1 | Quarterfinals | 2 | 1 | 0 | 1 | 190 | 154 | +36 | 50.00 |
| BBL Playoffs | 29 April 2022 | 1 May 2022 | Quarterfinals | Quarterfinals | 2 | 0 | 0 | 2 | 190 | 158 | +32 | 0.00 |
| Total | | | | | 39 | 13 | 0 | 26 | 3,069 | 3,324 | −255 | 33.33 |

Source: Competitions

== BBL Championship ==
=== Standings ===
| Pos | Team | Pld | W | L | PF | PA | PD | Pts | Qualification |
|---|---|---|---|---|---|---|---|---|---|
| 6 | Cheshire Phoenix | 27 | 13 | 14 | 2272 | 2280 | −8 | 26 | Playoffs |
| 7 | Glasgow Rocks | 27 | 12 | 15 | 2415 | 2471 | −56 | 24 | Playoffs |
| 8 | Plymouth City Patriots | 27 | 12 | 15 | 2176 | 2319 | −143 | 24 | Playoffs |
| 9 | Newcastle Eagles | 27 | 10 | 17 | 2313 | 2422 | −109 | 20 | |
| 10 | Surrey Scorchers | 27 | 2 | 25 | 1959 | 2457 | −498 | 4 | |

Updated to match(es) played on 24 April 2022. Source: BBC Sport

=== Ladder progression ===
- Numbers highlighted in green indicate that the team finished the round inside the top eight.
- Numbers highlighted in blue indicates the team finished first on the ladder in that round.
- Numbers highlighted in red indicates the team finished last place on the ladder in that round.

2021–22 BBL Championship
| Team | 1 | 2 | 3 | 4 | 5 | 6 | 7 | 8 | 9 | 10 | 11 | 12 | 13 | 14 | 15 | 16 | 17 | 18 | 19 | 20 | 21 | 22 | 23 | 24 |
|---|---|---|---|---|---|---|---|---|---|---|---|---|---|---|---|---|---|---|---|---|---|---|---|---|
| Bristol Flyers | – | 6 | 6 | 7 | 7 | 6 | 4 | 4 | 4 | 5 | 3 | 3 | 5 | 7 | 7 | 8 | 8 | 7 | 7 | 7 | 8 | 8 | 5 | 4 |
| Cheshire Phoenix | 4 | 10 | 10 | 8 | 8 | 8 | 8 | 8 | 8 | 4 | 6 | 5 | 4 | 4 | 2 | 2 | 3 | 4 | 4 | 4 | 5 | 5 | 6 | 6 |
| Glasgow Rocks | – | 8 | 8 | 4 | 5 | 7 | 7 | 5 | 5 | 6 | 8 | 8 | 8 | 9 | 9 | 9 | 9 | 9 | 9 | 9 | 6 | 6 | 7 | 7 |
| Leicester Riders | 2 | 5 | 5 | 3 | 1 | 1 | 1 | 1 | 1 | 1 | 1 | 1 | 1 | 1 | 1 | 1 | 1 | 1 | 1 | 1 | 1 | 1 | 1 | 1 |
| London Lions | – | 4 | 4 | 2 | 4 | 5 | 6 | 7 | 7 | 8 | 7 | 6 | 6 | 6 | 6 | 6 | 5 | 5 | 5 | 5 | 2 | 4 | 4 | 3 |
| Manchester Giants | 3 | 3 | 1 | 1 | 2 | 4 | 3 | 3 | 2 | 2 | 2 | 2 | 2 | 3 | 4 | 4 | 4 | 2 | 2 | 2 | 3 | 3 | 3 | 5 |
| Newcastle Eagles | 5 | 2 | 3 | 5 | 6 | 3 | 5 | 6 | 6 | 7 | 5 | 7 | 7 | 5 | 5 | 5 | 6 | 8 | 8 | 8 | 9 | 9 | 9 | 9 |
| Plymouth City Patriots | – | 9 | 9 | 10 | 9 | 9 | 10 | 10 | 10 | 9 | 9 | 9 | 9 | 8 | 8 | 7 | 7 | 6 | 6 | 6 | 7 | 7 | 8 | 8 |
| Sheffield Sharks | 1 | 1 | 2 | 6 | 3 | 2 | 2 | 2 | 3 | 3 | 4 | 4 | 3 | 2 | 3 | 3 | 2 | 3 | 3 | 3 | 4 | 2 | 2 | 2 |
| Surrey Scorchers | – | 7 | 7 | 9 | 10 | 10 | 9 | 9 | 9 | 10 | 10 | 10 | 10 | 10 | 10 | 10 | 10 | 10 | 10 | 10 | 10 | 10 | 10 | 10 |

=== Matches ===
| 7 November 2021 2 | Plymouth City Patriots | 74–99 | Newcastle Eagles | Plymouth |
| 15:00 | Scoring by quarter: 7–23, 21–26, 27–24, 19–26 |
| BBL Player | Pts: Josephs 26; Rebs: Graham-Bell 12; Asts: Dusha 6 | boxscore report | Pts: Fletcher 21; Rebs: Johnson, Peel, Shelton 10; Asts: Fletcher, Johnson 6 | Arena: Plymouth Pavilions; Attendance: not available Referees: Andrew Thackray, Kevin Kinsella, Joe Hodgson |

| 17 November 2021 4 | Plymouth City Patriots | 93–99(OT) | Manchester Giants | Plymouth |
| 19:00 | Scoring by quarter: 22–13, 14–21, 24–21, 20–25, Overtime: 13–19 |
| BBL Player | Pts: Josephs 46; Rebs: Graham-Bell, Okoroh 9 Asts: Josephs 8 | boxscore report | Pts: Armstrong 20; Rebs: Artison 10; Asts: Armstrong 5 | Arena: Plymouth Pavilions; Attendance: not available Referees: Gavin Williams, Iain Spearman, Andrew Thackray |

| 21 November 2021 4 | Glasgow Rocks | 107–96 | Plymouth City Patriots | Glasgow |
| 17:00 | Scoring by quarter: 30–21, 20–23, 27–22, 30–30 |
| BBL Player | Pts: Bunyan 24; Rebs: Hillsman 10; Asts: Bunyan 8 | boxscore report | Pts: Josephs 27; Rebs: Okoroh 8 Asts: Carpenter 11 | Arena: Emirates Arena; Attendance: 500; Referees: Mariann Dodds-Miklosik, Iain Macdonald, Bartek Rasinski |

| 3 December 2021 6 | Sheffield Sharks | 62–51 | Plymouth City Patriots | Sheffield |
| 19:30 | Scoring by quarter: 20–7, 10–23, 18–15, 14–6 |
| BBL Player | Pts: Glasgow Jr. 16; Rebs: Anderson, Koch, Delpeche, Williams 7 Asts: Anderson 5 | boxscore report | Pts: Graham-Bell 17; Rebs: King 9 Asts: Dusha 6 | Arena: Ponds Forge; Attendance: 317; Referees: Paul Unsworth, Matthew Lloyd, Tom Muddiman |

| 5 December 2021 6 | Bristol Flyers | 78–58 | Plymouth City Patriots | Bristol |
| 15:00 | Scoring by quarter: 17–16, 17–13, 26–15, 18–14 |
| BBL Player | Pts: Delpeche, Evans 17; Rebs: Simmons 11; Asts: Evans 6 | boxscore report | Pts: Josephs 24; Rebs: King 8 Asts: Dusha 6 | Arena: SGS College Arena; Attendance: not available Referees: Steve Ellis, Bartek Rasinski, Iain Spearman |

| 8 December 2021 7 | Plymouth City Patriots | 61–66 | Sheffield Sharks | Plymouth |
| 19:00 | Scoring by quarter: 12–19, 17–9, 11–15, 21–23 |
| BBL Player | Pts: Graham-Bell 21; Rebs: Hart 6 Asts: Dusha 10 | boxscore report | Pts: Glasgow Jr. 18; Rebs: Delpeche 8 Asts: Anderson 4 | Arena: Plymouth Pavilions; Attendance: not available Referees: Gavin Williams, Darren Bolt, Andrew Thackray |

| 19 December 2021 8 | Cheshire Phoenix | 120–69 | Plymouth City Patriots | Ellesmere Port |
| 17:30 | Scoring by quarter: 27–20, 28–20, 28–8, 37–21 |
| BBL Player | Pts: Austin Jr. 21; Rebs: Dickerson 15; Asts: Austin Jr. 10 | boxscore report | Pts: Hassan 30; Rebs: Hassan 14; Asts: Ubiaro 5 | Arena: Cheshire Oaks Arena; Attendance: 66; Referees: Josh Bowe, Kevin Kinsella, Tom Muddiman |

| 27 December 2021 9 | Leicester Riders | 106–60 | Plymouth City Patriots | Leicester |
| 18:00 | Scoring by quarter: 27–15, 29–10, 22–15, 28–20 |
| BBL Player | Pts: Nelson-Henry 22; Rebs: Loving 11; Asts: Mackenzie 9 | boxscore report | Pts: Josephs 21; Rebs: Ubiaro 8 Asts: Dusha 5 | Arena: Morningside Arena; Attendance: 666; Referees: Steve Ellis, Joe Hodgson, Kevin Kinsella |

| 14 January 2022 10 | Plymouth City Patriots | 82–73 | Surrey Scorchers | Plymouth |
| 19:30 | Scoring by quarter: 20–21, 23–11, 22–18, 17–23 |
| Sky Sports | Pts: Williams 25; Rebs: King 7 Asts: Williams 4 | boxscore report | Pts: Hamrick 25; Rebs: Jamison 14; Asts: Dang-Akodo 5 | Arena: Plymouth Pavilions; Attendance: not available Referees: Gavin Williams, Darren Bolt, Iain Spearman |

| 16 January 2022 10 | Manchester Giants | 74–84 | Plymouth City Patriots | Manchester |
| 17:00 | Scoring by quarter: 23–24, 14–30, 18–17, 22–13 |
| BBL Player | Pts: Clark 15; Rebs: Whelan 6 Asts: Armstrong 5 | boxscore report | Pts: Hassan 23; Rebs: Hassan 12; Asts: Williams 9 | Arena: National Basketball Centre; Attendance: not available Referees: Paul Walton, Neil McKelvey, Kevin Kinsella |

| 28 January 2022 12 | Plymouth City Patriots | 94–101 | London Lions | Plymouth |
| 19:00 | Scoring by quarter: 22–23, 26–29, 23–27, 23–22 |
| BBL Player | Pts: Josephs 27; Rebs: Hassan 10; Asts: Williams 6 | boxscore report | Pts: Reese, Williams 22; Rebs: Kelley 12; Asts: Reese 13 | Arena: Plymouth Pavilions; Attendance: not available Referees: Gavin Williams, Darren Bolt, Iain Spearman |

| 6 February 2022 13 | Plymouth City Patriots | 87–74 | Surrey Scorchers | Plymouth |
| 15:00 | Scoring by quarter: 23–26, 28–18, 14–17, 22–13 |
| BBL Player | Pts: Hart 25; Rebs: King 12; Asts: Williams 9 | boxscore report | Pts: Davis Jr. 20; Rebs: Thomas 10; Asts: Davis Jr. 7 | Arena: Plymouth Pavilions; Attendance: not available Referees: Neil McKelvey, Darren Bolt, Iain Spearman |

| 11 February 2022 14 | Bristol Flyers | 73–77 | Plymouth City Patriots | Bristol |
| 19:30 | Scoring by quarter: 19–21, 20–18, 20–23, 14–15 |
| BBL Player | Pts: Evans 22; Rebs: Jacob 9 Asts: Evans 6 | boxscore report | Pts: Hart 20; Rebs: Hassan 9 Asts: Williams 9 | Arena: SGS College Arena; Attendance: 770; Referees: Eduard Uydanskyy, Rob Hickman, David Griffin |

| 13 February 2022 14 | Plymouth City Patriots | 77–76 | Manchester Giants | Plymouth |
| 15:00 | Scoring by quarter: 15–17, 22–16, 16–24, 24–19 |
| BBL Player | Pts: Graham-Bell 17; Rebs: King 6 Asts: Williams 9 | boxscore report | Pts: Steel 18; Rebs: Clark 10; Asts: Clark 4 | Arena: Plymouth Pavilions; Attendance: 770; Referees: Andrew Thackray, Darren Bolt, Iain Spearman |

| 18 February 2022 15 | Plymouth City Patriots | 110–103(OT) | Bristol Flyers | Plymouth |
| 19:00 | Scoring by quarter: 17–24, 20–20, 30–19, 21–25, Overtime: 12–12, 10–3 |
| BBL Player | Pts: Williams 35; Rebs: Graham-Bell 13; Asts: Williams 11 | boxscore report | Pts: Evans 20; Rebs: Simmons 15; Asts: Jacob 6 | Arena: Plymouth Pavilions; Attendance: not available Referees: Steve Ellis, Kevin Kinsella, Joe Hodgson |

| 20 February 2022 15 | Cheshire Phoenix | 80–77 | Plymouth City Patriots | Ellesmere Port |
| 17:30 | Scoring by quarter: 21–22, 24–28, 15–15, 20–21 |
| BBL Player | Pts: Austin Jr., Wright 15; Rebs: Austin Jr. 15; Asts: Okereafor 7 | boxscore report | Pts: Graham-Bell, Williams 22; Rebs: Hart 9 Asts: Dusha 7 | Arena: Cheshire Oaks Arena; Attendance: 1,000; Referees: Simon Unsworth, Tom Muddiman, Matthew Lloyd |

| 25 February 2022 16 | London Lions | 81–83 | Plymouth City Patriots | London |
| 19:30 | Scoring by quarter: 26–18, 22–17, 14–22, 19–26 |
| BBL Player | Pts: D. Williams 20; Rebs: D. Williams 8 Asts: Reese 12 | boxscore report | Pts: Hassan 28; Rebs: Hassan 10; Asts: Williams 5 | Arena: Copper Box Arena; Attendance: not available Referees: Eduard Udyanskyy, Rob Hickman, Firooz Dehdarvand |

| 27 February 2022 16 | Plymouth City Patriots | 73–77 | London Lions | Plymouth |
| 15:00 | Scoring by quarter: 22–16, 15–19, 21–21, 15–21 |
| BBL Player | Pts: Hassan 15; Rebs: Hassan 8 Asts: Williams 9 | boxscore report | Pts: Cugini, D. Williams 17; Rebs: Washburn 9 Asts: Reese 9 | Arena: Plymouth Pavilions; Attendance: 1,300; Referees: Gavin Williams, Darren Bolt, Andrew Thackray |

| 4 March 2022 17 | Newcastle Eagles | 87–91 | Plymouth City Patriots | Newcastle upon Tyne |
| 19:30 | Scoring by quarter: 23–16, 20–17, 20–29, 24–29 |
| BBL Player | Pts: Gordon 20; Rebs: Gordon 7 Asts: Fletcher 11 | boxscore report | Pts: Hassan 23; Rebs: Hassan 11; Asts: Williams 15 | Arena: Vertu Motors Arena; Attendance: 2,800; Referees: Chris Dodds, Nick Nassi, Bartek Rasinski |

| 8 March 2022 18 | Plymouth City Patriots | 96–80 | Cheshire Phoenix | Plymouth |
| 19:00 | Scoring by quarter: 18–16, 28–21, 16–22, 34–21 |
| BBL Player | Pts: Graham-Bell, Williams 19; Rebs: Adekunle 7 Asts: Williams 15 | boxscore report | Pts: Okereafor 22; Rebs: Austin Jr. 7 Asts: Austin Jr. 6 | Arena: Plymouth Pavilions; Attendance: not available Referees: Gavin Williams, Darren Bolt, Iain Spearman |

| 13 March 2022 18 | Glasgow Rocks | 99–87 | Plymouth City Patriots | Glasgow |
| 19:00 | Scoring by quarter: 25–19, 23–22, 27–28, 24–18 |
| BBL Player | Pts: Jacdonmi, Johnson 20; Rebs: Jacdonmi 8 Asts: Murray 8 | boxscore report | Pts: Graham-Bell 24; Rebs: Graham-Bell 6 Asts: Williams 11 | Arena: Emirates Arena; Attendance: not available Referees: Mariann Dodds-Miklosik, Iain Macdonald, Bartek Rasinski |

| 1 April 2022 21 | Sheffield Sharks | 71–61 | Plymouth City Patriots | Sheffield |
| 19:30 | Scoring by quarter: 24–12, 12–17, 13–15, 22–17 |
| BBL Player | Pts: Glasgow Jr. 17; Rebs: Ratinho 13; Asts: Glasgow Jr. 5 | boxscore report | Pts: Graham-Bell 18; Rebs: Graham-Bell 9 Asts: Dusha 7 | Arena: Ponds Forge; Attendance: 642; Referees: Steve Ferris, Tom Muddiman, Kevin Kinsella |

| 6 April 2022 22 | Plymouth City Patriots | 60–77 | Leicester Riders | Plymouth |
| 19:00 | Scoring by quarter: 17–19, 14–24, 15–24, 14–10 |
| BBL Player | Pts: Williams 20; Rebs: Hassan 11; Asts: Hart 5 | boxscore report | Pts: Crandell 25; Rebs: Crandell 8 Asts: Crandell 7 | Arena: Plymouth Pavilions; Attendance: not available Referees: Gavin Williams, Darren Bolt, Iain Spearman |

| 9 April 2022 22 | Surrey Scorchers | 84–98 | Plymouth City Patriots | Guildford |
| 18:00 | Scoring by quarter: 30–25, 10–28, 20–29, 24–16 |
| BBL Player | Pts: Ogedengbe 21; Rebs: Thomas 8 Asts: Dang Akodo 7 | boxscore report | Pts: Williams 28; Rebs: Hart, Hassan 6 Asts: Williams 9 | Arena: Surrey Sports Park; Attendance: 400; Referees: Eduard Udyanskyy, Andrew Thackray, Tahir Akar |

| 13 April 2022 23 | Plymouth City Patriots | 115–105 | Glasgow Rocks | Plymouth |
| 19:00 | Scoring by quarter: 32–16, 21–34, 30–19, 32–36 |
| BBL Player | Pts: Hassan 31; Rebs: Graham-Bell 11; Asts: Williams 13 | boxscore report | Pts: Malcolm 24; Rebs: Harris 10; Asts: Johnson 11 | Arena: Plymouth Pavilions; Attendance: unknown Referees: Darren Bolt, Andrew Thackray, Iain Spearman |

| 22 April 2022 24 | Leicester Riders | 92–82 | Plymouth City Patriots | Leicester |
| 20:00 | Scoring by quarter: 24–25, 24–16, 18–2, 26–19 |
| BBL Player | Pts: Washington 20; Rebs: Walker 9 Asts: Crandell 8 | boxscore report | Pts: Simons 22; Rebs: Graham-Bell 10; Asts: Dusha 5 | Arena: Morningside Arena; Attendance: 666; Referees: Tom Muddiman, Tahir Akar, Rob Hickman |

| 24 April 2022 24 | Plymouth City Patriots | 80–72 | Newcastle Eagles | Plymouth |
| 15:00 | Scoring by quarter: 20–16, 23–18, 17–20, 20–18 |
| BBL Player | Pts: Graham-Bell 26; Rebs: Hassan 12; Asts: Dusha 7 | boxscore report | Pts: Fletcher 21; Rebs: Gordon 7 Asts: Fletcher 9 | Arena: Plymouth Pavilions; Attendance: 1500; Referees: Gavin Williams, Darren Bolt, Andrew Thackray |

== BBL playoffs ==
=== Bracket ===
Quarter-finals
1 | Leicester Riders | 86 | 88 | 174
8 | Plymouth City Patriots | 71 | 87 | 158
2 | Sheffield Sharks | 83 | 72 | 155
7 | Glasgow Rocks | 76 | 96 | 172
3 | London Lions | 85 | 95 | 180
7 | Cheshire Phoenix | 69 | 97 | 166
4 | Bristol Flyers | 79 | 94 | 173
5 | Manchester Giants | 91 | 80 | 171

Semi-finals
1 | Leicester Riders | 105 | 104 | 209
7 | Glasgow Rocks | 84 | 78 | 162
3 | London Lions | 85 | 91 | 176
4 | Bristol Flyers | 83 | 73 | 156

Final
1 | Leicester Riders | 78
3 | London Lions | 75

=== Quarter-Finals ===
| 29 April 2022 | Plymouth City Patriots | 71–86 (Series: Leicester leads, 86–71 on aggregate) | Leicester Riders | Plymouth |
| 19:30 | Scoring by quarter: 17–12, 19–27, 18–25, 17–22 |
| BBL Player | Pts: Simons 16; Rebs: Hassan 7 Asts: Williams 9 | boxscore report | Pts: Whelan 19; Rebs: Nelson-Henry 10; Asts: Loving 4 | Arena: Plymouth Pavilions; Attendance: not available |

| 1 May 2022 | Leicester Riders | 88–87 (Series: Leicester wins, 174–158 on aggregate) | Plymouth City Patriots | Leicester |
| 16:00 | Scoring by quarter: 23–26, 19–19, 21–18, 25–24 |
| BBL Player | Pts: Jackson 18; Rebs: Walker 8 Asts: Whelan 4 | boxscore report | Pts: Williams 25; Rebs: Graham-Bell 8 Asts: Williams 9 | Arena: Morningside Arena; Attendance: 1,000; Referees: Keith Williams, Simon Unsworth, Steve Ferris |

== BBL Cup ==
=== South Group ===
| Pos | Team | Pld | W | L | PF | PA | PD | Pts | Qualification |
|---|---|---|---|---|---|---|---|---|---|
| 1 | London Lions | 8 | 7 | 1 | 722 | 622 | +100 | 14 | Quarter-finals |
| 2 | Leicester Riders | 8 | 6 | 2 | 715 | 616 | +99 | 12 | Quarter-finals |
| 3 | Bristol Flyers | 8 | 4 | 4 | 649 | 653 | −4 | 8 | Quarter-finals |
| 4 | Surrey Scorchers | 8 | 3 | 5 | 639 | 654 | −15 | 6 | Quarter-finals |
| 5 | Plymouth City Patriots | 8 | 0 | 8 | 513 | 693 | −180 | 0 | |

Updated to match(es) played on 7 November 2021. Source: BBC Sport

| 25 September 2021 | Bristol Flyers | 84–75 | Plymouth City Patriots | Bristol |
| 19:30 | Scoring by quarter: 32–30, 25–12, 10–18, 17–15 |
| BBL Player | Pts: Miller, Thomas-Edwards 14; Rebs: Thomas-Edwards 12; Asts: Miller, Thomas-Edwards 6 | boxscore report | Pts: Ubiaro 25; Rebs: King 9 Asts: Dusha 6 | Arena: SGS College Arena; Attendance: 350; Referees: Gavin Williams, Andrew Thackray, Iain Spearman |

| 26 September 2021 | London Lions | 90–61 | Plymouth City Patriots | London |
| 16:00 | Scoring by quarter: 23–14, 23–14, 18–20, 26–13 |
| BBL Player | Pts: D. Williams 19; Rebs: Washburn 11; Asts: Reese 11 | boxscore report | Pts: Ubiaro 20; Rebs: King, Shelton 11; Asts: Hart 3 | Arena: Copper Box Arena; Attendance: 700; Referees: Eduard Udyanskyy, Tahir Akar, Firooz Dehdarvand |

| 2 October 2021 | Surrey Scorchers | 65–57 | Plymouth City Patriots | Guildford |
| 18:00 | Scoring by quarter: 20–17, 22–18, 8–15, 15–7 |
| BBL Player | Pts: Davis Jr. 18; Rebs: Jamison 10; Asts: Davis Jr. 7 | boxscore report | Pts: Ubiaro 15; Rebs: Hart 13; Asts: Hart 6 | Arena: Surrey Sports Park; Attendance: 400; Referees: Eduard Udyanskyy, Tahir Akar, Keith Williams |

| 10 October 2021 | Plymouth City Patriots | 58–109 | Leicester Riders | Plymouth |
| 15:00 | Scoring by quarter: 15–26, 15–29, 12–26, 16–28 |
| BBL Player | Pts: Ubiaro 22; Rebs: Adekunle, King 10; Asts: Carpenter 3 | boxscore report | Pts: Jackson 25; Rebs: Walker 8 Asts: Crandall 8 | Arena: Plymouth Pavilions; Attendance: not available Referees: Gavin Williams, Darren Bolt, Iain Spearman |

| 17 October 2021 | Plymouth City Patriots | 62–101 | London Lions | Plymouth |
| 15:00 | Scoring by quarter: 16–30, 16–20, 16–27, 14–24 |
| BBL Player | Pts: Ubiaro 14; Rebs: King 6 Asts: Hart 8 | boxscore report | Pts: Cugini 35; Rebs: Williams 9 Asts: Spencer 12 | Arena: Plymouth Pavilions; Attendance: not available Referees: Darren Bolt, Andrew Thackray, Firooz Dehdarvand |

| 20 October 2021 | Plymouth City Patriots | 69–82 | Bristol Flyers | Plymouth |
| 19:00 | Scoring by quarter: 14–13, 16–17, 17–24, 22–28 |
| BBL Player | Pts: Hart 22; Rebs: King 8 Asts: Dusha 7 | boxscore report | Pts: Jacob 18; Rebs: Miller, Simmons 11; Asts: Miller 6 | Arena: Plymouth Pavilions; Attendance: 250; Referees: Darren Bolt, Tahir Akar, Iain Spearman |

| 24 October 2021 | Leicester Riders | 81–64 | Plymouth City Patriots | Leicester |
| 16:00 | Scoring by quarter: 24–18, 16–9, 24–24, 17–13 |
| BBL Player | Pts: Loving 20; Rebs: Crandall 7 Asts: Crandall 12 | boxscore report | Pts: Ubaiaro 19; Rebs: King 8 Asts: Hart 6 | Arena: Morningside Arena; Attendance: not available Referees: Eduard Udyanskyy, Steve Ellis, J. Ashton |

| 27 October 2021 | Plymouth City Patriots | 67–81 | Surrey Scorchers | Plymouth |
| 19:00 | Scoring by quarter: 18–22, 20–29, 15–20, 14–10 |
| BBL Player | Pts: Ubiaro 17; Rebs: Hart 6 Asts: Hart 6 | boxscore report | Pts: Davis Jr., McLemore 17; Rebs: McLemore 11; Asts: McLemore, Ogedengbe, Raftopoulos 2 | Arena: Plymouth Pavilions; Attendance: not available Referees: Darren Bolt, Iain Spearman, Andrew Thackray |

== BBL Trophy ==
=== First round ===
| 9 January 2022 | Plymouth City Patriots | 113–66 | Basketball Wales | Plymouth |
| 15:00 | Scoring by quarter: 34–18, 36–11, 29–16, 14–21 |
| BBL Player | Pts: Josephs 22; Rebs: Dusha, Hart, Ubiaro 6 Asts: Williams 11 | boxscore report | Pts: Porter 16; Rebs: Woog 10; Asts: Minty-Walker 7 | Arena: Plymouth Pavilions; Attendance: not available Referees: Darren Bolt, Iain Spearman, Andrew Thackray |

=== Quarter-Finals ===
| 26 January 2022 | Plymouth City Patriots | 77–88 | Cheshire Phoenix | Plymouth |
| 19:00 | Scoring by quarter: 15–22, 17–30, 19–19, 26–17 |
| BBL Player | Pts: Hassan 22; Rebs: King 11; Asts: Dusha, Williams 4 | boxscore report | Pts: Mockford 17; Rebs: Dickerson 11; Asts: Okereafor 7 | Arena: Plymouth Pavilions; Attendance: not available Referees: Gavin Williams, Darren Bolt, Andrew Thackray |

== Statistics ==
=== BBL Championship ===
| Player | GP | MPG | 2FG% | 3FG% | FT% | RPG | APG | SPG | BPG | PPG |
|---|---|---|---|---|---|---|---|---|---|---|
| Deji Adekunle | 25 | 10.8 | 40.9% | 0% | 61.1% | 2.5 | 0.2 | 0.3 | 0.2 | 2.6 |
| Tobias Aigner | 1 | 5 | 0% | 0% | 0% | 0 | 0 | 0 | 0 | 0 |
| Liam Carpenter | 6 | 23 | 56.7% | 15.4% | 66.7% | 1.5 | 2.7 | 0 | 0 | 4.3 |
| Elvisi Dusha | 22 | 25.6 | 33.3% | 36.5% | 66.7% | 2.9 | 5.5 | 0.9 | 0.1 | 5.3 |
| Daniel Fawell-Molloy | 6 | 1.8 | 0% | 33.3% | 0% | 0 | 0 | 0 | 0 | 0.5 |
| Rowell Graham-Bell | 24 | 28 | 49.6% | 33.3% | 71% | 7.1 | 1.3 | 0.9 | 0.6 | 14.8 |
| Joseph Hart | 26 | 30.7 | 43.6% | 36.2% | 73.9% | 3.9 | 2.8 | 1 | 0 | 9 |
| Rashad Hassan | 21 | 30.3 | 62.4% | 0% | 58.2% | 7.4 | 1.1 | 0.5 | 0.4 | 17.3 |
| Kofi Josephs | 12 | 31.8 | 48.8% | 34% | 84% | 3.6 | 2.8 | 1.5 | 0 | 20.8 |
| Cameron King | 23 | 15.9 | 39.2% | 0% | 76.9% | 4.3 | 0.5 | 0.6 | 0.8 | 3 |
| Liam Langridge-Barker | 4 | 10.7 | 100% | 33.3% | 0% | 1 | 0.3 | 0 | 0 | 2.8 |
| Kingsley Okoroh | 5 | 24.3 | 50% | 0% | 57.1% | 5.2 | 1.4 | 0.2 | 2.8 | 5.6 |
| Troy Simons | 9 | 29 | 60.5% | 36.1% | 75% | 3 | 2.6 | 1.6 | 0 | 14.1 |
| Denzel Ubiaro | 20 | 25 | 44.4% | 23.1% | 68.9% | 3.5 | 2 | 1 | 0.4 | 8.3 |
| Isaiah Walker | 12 | 4.8 | 100% | 16.7% | 0% | 0.7 | 0.2 | 0 | 0.1 | 0.8 |
| Antonio Williams | 19 | 34.3 | 55.5% | 27.5% | 71.6% | 4.3 | 8.3 | 2.1 | 0.5 | 18.6 |

Source: British Basketball League

=== All Competitions ===
Statistics for all competitions including BBL Championship, BBL Cup, BBL Trophy and BBL Playoffs.

| Player | GP | MPG | 2FG% | 3FG% | FT% | RPG | APG | SPG | BPG | PPG |
|---|---|---|---|---|---|---|---|---|---|---|
| Deji Adekunle | 34 | 13.79 | 39.1% | 0% | 59.4% | 2.94 | 0.38 | 0.41 | 0.35 | 3.09 |
| Tobias Aigner | 1 | 5.03 | 0% | 0% | 0% | 0 | 0 | 0 | 0 | 0 |
| Liam Carpenter | 14 | 23.49 | 46.5% | 20.6% | 70.0% | 1.86 | 2.21 | 0.50 | 0 | 5.36 |
| Elvisi Dusha | 31 | 24.60 | 37.0% | 31.3% | 62.5% | 2.90 | 4.94 | 0.87 | 0.13 | 5.58 |
| Daniel Fawell-Molloy | 7 | 3.14 | 0% | 20.0% | 0% | 0.29 | 0 | 0 | 0 | 0.43 |
| Rowell Graham-Bell | 27 | 27.67 | 49.2% | 32.4% | 72.7% | 6.74 | 1.30 | 1.00 | 0.56 | 14.44 |
| Joseph Hart | 38 | 30.47 | 43.3% | 32.6% | 78.8% | 4.13 | 2.89 | 0.95 | 0.05 | 9.03 |
| Rashad Hassan | 25 | 29.86 | 63.4% | 0% | 56.3% | 7.04 | 1.08 | 0.40 | 0.4 | 16.76 |
| Kofi Josephs | 14 | 30.21 | 45.8% | 35.1% | 81.2% | 3.71 | 2.50 | 1.57 | 0 | 19.79 |
| Cameron King | 35 | 19.33 | 41.8% | 5.9% | 77.8% | 5.20 | 0.80 | 0.80 | 0.94 | 4.17 |
| Liam Langridge-Barker | 11 | 6.54 | 50.0% | 31.8% | 0% | 0.73 | 0.09 | 0.36 | 0 | 2.09 |
| Muhammed Okiki | 3 | 5.48 | 0% | 50.0% | 0% | 1.00 | 0.33 | 0 | 0 | 1.00 |
| Kingsley Okoroh | 6 | 20.94 | 50.0% | 0% | 57.1% | 4.67 | 1.17 | 0.17 | 2.33 | 4.67 |
| Shawn Shelton | 7 | 22.76 | 39.3% | 20.0% | 90.2% | 4.86 | 0.43 | 0.86 | 0.29 | 9.57 |
| Troy Simons | 11 | 30.29 | 64.6% | 36.8% | 75.0% | 3.36 | 2.55 | 1.55 | 0 | 14.36 |
| Denzel Ubiaro | 32 | 27.30 | 47.3% | 31.3% | 67.8% | 3.66 | 1.91 | 1.00 | 0.34 | 11.13 |
| Isaiah Walker | 21 | 8.63 | 50.0% | 17.3% | 75.0% | 1.24 | 0.24 | 0.19 | 0.14 | 2.10 |
| Antonio Williams | 23 | 33.70 | 55.3% | 28.9% | 71.1% | 4.00 | 8.30 | 2.35 | 0.43 | 18.57 |

Source: BritHoops.com
