= 2022–23 Plymouth City Patriots season =

- Head coach: (United Kingdom) Paul James
- Captain: (Albania) Elvisi Dusha
- Arena: Plymouth Pavilions

BBL results
- Record: 11–25 (.306)
- Ladder: 9th
- BBL Cup: First round
- BBL Trophy: Quarterfinalist
- Playoff finish: Did not qualify
- Biggest win: Plymouth 105–52 St Mirren (7 January 2023)
- Biggest defeat: Plymouth 51–102 London (12 March 2023)
- Stats at BBL.org.uk

Player records
- Points: (United States) A. Williams 19.9
- Rebounds: (United States) R. Hassan 7.1
- Assists: (Albania) E. Dusha 6.1
- All statistics correct as of 23 April 2023.

The 2022–23 Plymouth City Patriots season is the 2nd season of the franchise in the British Basketball League (BBL).

== Players ==
=== Squad information ===
Note: Flags indicate national team eligibility at FIBA-sanctioned events. Players may hold other non-FIBA nationalities not displayed.

Plymouth City Patriots roster
Players
Coaches

Pos.	No.	Nat.	Name	Ht.	Wt.	Age
SG	0	(United Kingdom)	Brandon, Isa	1.93 m (6 ft 4 in)	88 kg (194 lb)	28 – 18 March 1997
SF	1	(United States)	Bissainthe, Ralph	2.01 m (6 ft 7 in)	93 kg (205 lb)	25 – 29 March 1999
F	2	(United States)	Hawthorne Jr., James	2.00 m (6 ft 7 in)	95 kg (209 lb)	28 – 17 February 1997
G	8	(United Kingdom)	Fawell-Molloy, Daniel (TW)	1.93 m (6 ft 4 in)	82 kg (181 lb)	23 – 20 July 2001
G	9	(United Kingdom)	Lanipekun, Patrick	1.93 m (6 ft 4 in)	83 kg (183 lb)	25 – 10 June 1999
PG	11	(United States)	Gadsden, Ty	1.85 m (6 ft 1 in)	75 kg (165 lb)	28 – 17 October 1996
PG	12	(Albania)	Dusha, Elvisi (C)	1.88 m (6 ft 2 in)	89 kg (196 lb)	30 – 15 July 1994
F	13	(Canada)	Iyekekpolor, Otas	2.03 m (6 ft 8 in)	100 kg (220 lb)	28 – 20 June 1996
C	15	(United Kingdom)	Keita, Samuel	2.08 m (6 ft 10 in)	98 kg (216 lb)	25 – 18 November 1999
PG	17	(United Kingdom)	Dang-Akodo, Jules	1.91 m (6 ft 3 in)	82 kg (181 lb)	28 – 2 May 1996
F/C	22	(United States)	Hassan, Rashad	2.03 m (6 ft 8 in)	98 kg (216 lb)	35 – 23 September 1989
F	24	(United Kingdom)	White, Will (TW)	1.91 m (6 ft 3 in)

Head coach

- (United Kingdom) Paul James

Assistant coach(es)

- (United Kingdom) Joseph Hart

Legend

- (C) Team captain
- (TW) Two-way affiliate player with
  Plymouth Marjon University
- Injured

- Roster
Updated: 23 April 2023

=== Depth chart ===
Pos.	Starting 5	Bench 1	Bench 2
C	Rashad Hassan	Samuel Keita
PF	Ralph Bissainthe	Otas Iyekekpolor	Will White
SF	James Hawthorne Jr.	Patrick Lanipekun
SG	Ty Gadsden	Isa Brandon	Daniel Fawell-Molloy
PG	Elvisi Dusha	Jules Dang-Akodo

=== Transactions ===
==== In ====
No.	Pos.	Nat.	Name	Age	Moving from		Date	Source
2	F	(United States)	James Hawthorne Jr.	25	Free Agent	(United States)	24 June 2022	
1	PF	(United States)	Markedric Bell	23	Prairie View A&M Panthers	(United States)	31 August 2022	
24	F	(United Kingdom)	Romario Spence	23	Oklahoma City Stars	(United States)	31 August 2022	
15	C	(United Kingdom)	Samuel Keita	22	North Carolina Central Eagles	(United States)	16 September 2022	
0	SG	(United Kingdom)	Isa Brandon	25	Killorglin	(Republic of Ireland)	26 September 2022	
9	G	(United Kingdom)	Patrick Lanipekun	23	Mt. Hood Saints	(United States)	7 October 2022	
10	G	(United States)	Jawaun Daniels	24	Prairie View A&M Panthers	(United States)	7 January 2023	
11	PG	(United States)	Ty Gadsden	26	Rayos de Hermosillo	(Mexico)	10 January 2023	
17	PG	(United Kingdom)	Jules Dang-Akodo	26	Surrey Scorchers	(United Kingdom)	19 January 2023	
1	F	(United States)	Ralph Bissainthe	23	Nässjö Basket	(Sweden)	27 February 2023	
13	F	(Canada)	Otas Iyekekpolor	26	London Lightning	(Canada)	2 March 2023	

==== Out ====
No.	Pos.	Nat.	Name	Age	Moving to		Date	Source
21	SF	(United Kingdom)	Rowell Graham-Bell	27	Edmonton Stingers	(Canada)	May 2022	
4	C	(United Kingdom)	Deji Adekunle	29	Free Agent	(United Kingdom)	May 2022	
10	PF	(United Kingdom)	Denzel Ubiaro	25	Free Agent	(United Kingdom)	May 2022	
11	SG	(United Kingdom)	Isaiah Walker	23	Worcester Wolves	(United Kingdom)	22 September 2022	
17	SF	(United Kingdom)	Liam Langridge-Barker	23	Worcester Wolves	(United Kingdom)	23 September 2022	
0	PF	(United Kingdom)	Cameron King	26	Sligo All-Stars	(Republic of Ireland)	23 September 2022	
24	F	(United Kingdom)	Romario Spence	23	Hemel Storm	(United Kingdom)	19 October 2022	
4	PG	(United States)	Antonio Williams	25	Knattspyrnufélag Reykjavíkur	(Iceland)	6 January 2023	
3	SG	(United States)	Troy Simons	26	Oliveirense	(Portugal)	10 January 2023	
10	G	(United States)	Jawaun Daniels	24	Free Agent	(United States)	17 February 2023	
1	PF	(United States)	Markedric Bell	23	Free Agent	(United States)	27 February 2023	

== Pre-season and friendlies ==
=== Tour of France ===
2 September 2022	CEP Lorient (France)	97–65	(United Kingdom) Plymouth City Patriots	Brest
20:30	Scoring by quarter: 24–17, 24–10, 17–30, 32–11
	Pts: Djambo 16	Report	Pts: Hassan 20	Arena: Gymnasium Provence; Attendance: not available Referees: Wallet, Simon
Note: Show Sport de Brest Tournament

3 September 2022	Le Mans Sarthe Basket (France)	96–52	(United Kingdom) Plymouth City Patriots	Vannes
20:30	Scoring by quarter: 20–8, 22–16, 29–13, 25–15
	Pts: Baptiste 14	Report	Pts: Ubiaro 19	Arena: Salle Omnisports de Kercado; Attendance: not available
Note: 13th Trophée du Golfe Vannes Tournament

4 September 2022	Nanterre 92 (France)	112–67	(United Kingdom) Plymouth City Patriots	Vannes
14:00	Scoring by quarter: 25–15, 35–18, 23–20, 29–14
	Pts: Rolle 21	Report	Pts: Hassan 19	Arena: Salle Omnisports de Kercado; Attendance: not available
Note: 13th Trophée du Golfe Vannes Tournament

=== Friendly matches ===
10 September 2022	Plymouth City Patriots	102–53	Basketball Wales	Plymouth
19:00	Scoring by quarter: 28–11, 25–6, 27–16, 22–20
				Arena: Plymouth Marjon University; Attendance: not available

18 September 2022	Bristol Flyers	93–52	Plymouth City Patriots	Bristol
16:00	Scoring by quarter: 20–12, 27–11, 16–21, 30–8
YouTube				Arena: SGS College Arena; Attendance: not available

== Competitions ==
Competition	First match	Last match	Starting round	Final position	Record							
Competition	First match	Last match	Starting round	Final position	Pld	W	D	L	PF	PA	PD	Win %
BBL Championship	25 September 2022	23 April 2023	Round 1	9th	36	11	0	25	2,845	3,254	−409	30.56
BBL Cup	9 October 2022	9 October 2022	First Round	First Round	1	0	0	1	75	77	−2	0.00
BBL Trophy	7 January 2023	12 February 2023	First Round	Quarterfinals	2	1	0	1	194	151	+43	50.00
BBL Playoffs	n/a	n/a	n/a	n/a	0	0	0	0	0	0	+0	—
Total					39	12	0	27	3,114	3,482	−368	30.77

Source: Competitions

== BBL Championship ==
=== Standings ===
Pos	Team	Pld	W	L	PF	PA	PD	Pts	Qualification
1	London Lions (C)	36	32	4	3168	2592	+576	64	Playoffs
2	Leicester Riders	36	25	11	3185	2951	+234	50	Playoffs
3	Bristol Flyers	36	25	11	2993	2873	+120	50	Playoffs
4	Caledonia Gladiators	36	19	17	3005	2990	+15	38	Playoffs
5	Cheshire Phoenix	36	19	17	2948	2927	+21	38	Playoffs
6	Manchester Giants	36	17	19	3228	3223	+5	34	Playoffs
7	Sheffield Sharks	36	17	19	2668	2691	−23	34	Playoffs
8	Newcastle Eagles	36	11	25	2879	3034	−155	22	Playoffs
9	Plymouth City Patriots	36	11	25	2845	3254	−409	22	
10	Surrey Scorchers	36	4	32	2763	3147	−384	8	

Updated to match(es) played on 23 April 2023. Source: BBC Sport
(C) Champions

Leader and qualification to playoffs
Qualification to playoffs
Last place

2022–23 BBL Championship
Team ╲ Round	1	2	3	4	5	6	7	8	9	10	11	12	13	14	15	16	17	18	19	20	21	22	23	24	25	26	27	28	29
Bristol Flyers	3	3	3	2	2	2	2	2	1	3	3	3	3	3	2	2	2	2	2	2	2	2	2	2	2	2	3	3	3
Caledonia Gladiators	—	—	6	8	7	8	8	8	8	6	7	5	4	5	6	6	6	5	5	4	4	5	4	5	5	5	4	4	4
Cheshire Phoenix	4	4	4	4	5	6	5	6	7	5	6	7	6	4	4	4	4	4	4	6	6	6	6	6	7	6	6	5	5
Leicester Riders	—	6	5	6	8	4	3	3	3	2	2	2	1	2	3	3	3	3	3	3	3	3	3	3	3	3	2	2	2
London Lions	1	2	1	1	1	1	1	1	2	1	1	1	2	1	1	1	1	1	1	1	1	1	1	1	1	1	1	1	1
Manchester Giants	5	1	2	3	3	3	4	4	5	7	8	8	8	7	5	5	5	6	6	5	5	4	5	4	4	4	5	7	6
Newcastle Eagles	—	8	10	10	9	9	9	9	9	9	9	9	9	9	9	9	9	9	9	9	9	9	9	9	9	9	9	9	8
Plymouth City Patriots	2	5	7	7	6	7	7	7	6	8	4	4	5	6	7	7	7	7	7	7	7	7	8	8	8	8	8	8	9
Sheffield Sharks	7	9	8	5	4	5	6	5	4	4	5	6	7	8	8	8	8	8	8	8	8	8	7	7	6	7	7	6	7
Surrey Scorchers	6	7	9	9	10	10	10	10	10	10	10	10	10	10	10	10	10	10	10	10	10	10	10	10	10	10	10	10	10

Updated to match(es) played on 23 April 2023. Source: BBL.org.uk

=== Matches ===
25 September 2022 1	Cheshire Phoenix	71–78	Plymouth City Patriots	Ellesmere Port
17:30	Scoring by quarter: 12–17, 20–21, 18–23, 21–17
YouTube	Pts: Anderson 21; Rebs: Ochereobia 10; Asts: Teague 6	boxscore report	Pts: Williams 27; Rebs: Brandon 9 Asts: Brandon, Williams 3	Arena: Cheshire Oaks Arena; Attendance: not available Referees: Paul Walton, Tom Muddiman, Joe Hodgson

2 October 2022 2	Manchester Giants	92–79	Plymouth City Patriots	Manchester
17:00	Scoring by quarter: 24–16, 23–14, 20–24, 25–25
YouTube	Pts: Green 28; Rebs: Lee 13; Asts: Fletcher 11	boxscore report	Pts: Williams 21; Rebs: Bell, Hassan 11; Asts: Brandon, Williams 4	Arena: National Basketball Performance Centre; Attendance: not available Referees: Paul Unsworth, Joe Hodgson, Nick Nassi

7 October 2022 3	Bristol Flyers	87–77	Plymouth City Patriots	Bristol
19:30	Scoring by quarter: 22–23, 31–21, 11–22, 23–10
YouTube	Pts: Olison 18; Rebs: Smith 11; Asts: Bell III 6	boxscore report	Pts: Dusha 21; Rebs: Bell 7 Asts: Dusha 8	Arena: SGS College Arena; Attendance: 770; Referees: Eduard Uydansky, Firooz Dehdarvand, David Griffin

23 October 2022 5	Plymouth City Patriots	91–68	Surrey Scorchers	Plymouth
15:00	Scoring by quarter: 22–22, 23–13, 22–10, 24–23
YouTube	Pts: Simons 24; Rebs: Bell 7 Asts: Dusha 9	boxscore report	Pts: Wang 16; Rebs: Wang 7 Asts: Wang 4	Arena: Plymouth Pavilions; Attendance: not available Referees: Eduard Uydansky, Iain Spearman, Hoj Fozi

28 October 2022 6	Newcastle Eagles	108–96	Plymouth City Patriots	Newcastle upon Tyne
19:45	Scoring by quarter: 30–21, 31–19, 26–28, 21–28
Sky Sports	Pts: Hamlet 31; Rebs: Hamlet 8 Asts: Hamlet 7	boxscore report	Pts: Hassan 26; Rebs: Hawthorne Jr. 15; Asts: Dusha 10	Arena: Vertu Motors Arena; Attendance: not available Referees: Josh Bowe, Iain Macdonald, Nick Nassi

30 October 2022 6	Plymouth City Patriots	93–85	Caledonia Gladiators	Plymouth
15:00	Scoring by quarter: 20–13, 23–22, 23–27, 27–23
YouTube	Pts: Hassan 23; Rebs: Hassan 9 Asts: Dusha 11	boxscore report	Pts: Onwas 21; Rebs: Tapé 14; Asts: Adams 5	Arena: Plymouth Pavilions; Attendance: not available Referees: Gavin Williams, Paul Unsworth, Iain Spearman

6 November 2022 7	Plymouth City Patriots	79–101	Leicester Riders	Plymouth
15:00	Scoring by quarter: 26–29, 16–26, 22–24, 15–22
YouTube	Pts: Dusha 24; Rebs: Brandon 10; Asts: Dusha 8	boxscore report	Pts: Jackson, Whelan 18; Rebs: Jackson 8 Asts: Loving 6	Arena: Plymouth Pavilions; Attendance: not available Referees: Iain Spearman, Andy Thackray, Firooz Dehdarvand

13 November 2022 8	Plymouth City Patriots	69–88	Sheffield Sharks	Plymouth
15:00	Scoring by quarter: 24–19, 12–21, 15–19, 18–29
YouTube	Pts: Hassan 16; Rebs: Hassan 12; Asts: Dusha 5	boxscore report	Pts: Delpeche, Nelson 15; Rebs: Delpeche 10; Asts: Nelson 6	Arena: Plymouth Pavilions; Attendance: not available Referees: Joe Hodgson, Rob Hickman, Eduard Uydansky

18 November 2022 9	Newcastle Eagles	79–95	Plymouth City Patriots	Newcastle upon Tyne
19:30	Scoring by quarter: 20–25, 21–27, 17–13, 21–30
YouTube	Pts: Johnson 25; Rebs: Defoe, Johnson, Kennedy 7 Asts: Cohn, Kennedy 4	boxscore report	Pts: Dusha 22; Rebs: Williams 9 Asts: Dusha, Williams 9	Arena: Vertu Motors Arena; Attendance: not available Referees: Chris Dodds, Paul Walton, Nick Nassi

20 November 2022 9	Plymouth City Patriots	103–96	Manchester Giants	Plymouth
15:00	Scoring by quarter: 30–30, 25–23, 27–15, 21–28
YouTube	Pts: Hassan, Williams 19; Rebs: Hawthorne Jr. 9 Asts: Dusha 17	boxscore report	Pts: Fletcher 26; Rebs: Green, Roberson 10; Asts: Fletcher 12	Arena: Plymouth Pavilions; Attendance: not available Referees: Gavin Williams, Tahir Akar, Beyti Ozgur

4 December 2022 10	Caledonia Gladiators	91–76	Plymouth City Patriots	Glasgow
17:00	Scoring by quarter: 18–24, 24–25, 21–15, 28–12
YouTube	Pts: Burns 24; Rebs: Onwas 11; Asts: Sloan 10	boxscore report	Pts: Dusha 24; Rebs: Bell 8 Asts: Dusha, Williams 5	Arena: Emirates Arena; Attendance: 650; Referees: Steve Ferris, Mariann Dodds-Miklosik, Bartek Rasinski

7 December 2022 11	Plymouth City Patriots	68–63	Sheffield Sharks	Plymouth
19:30	Scoring by quarter: 14–17, 17–9, 24–22, 13–15
YouTube	Pts: Williams 20; Rebs: Hassan 8 Asts: Williams 5	boxscore report	Pts: Ogunyemi 14; Rebs: Ratinho 11; Asts: Nichols 6	Arena: Plymouth Pavilions; Attendance: not available Referees: Gavin Williams, Andy Thackray, Ian Spearman

11 December 2022 11	Plymouth City Patriots	90–83	Surrey Scorchers	Plymouth
15:00	Scoring by quarter: 21–20, 24–21, 23–21, 21–21
YouTube	Pts: Hassan 18; Rebs: Brandon 7 Asts: Williams 12	boxscore report	Pts: Jefferson, Johnson 17; Rebs: Johnson 7 Asts: Taylor 11	Arena: Plymouth Pavilions; Attendance: not available Referees: Gavin Williams, Andy Thackray, Ian Spearman

18 December 2022 12	Sheffield Sharks	64–71	Plymouth City Patriots	Sheffield
16:00	Scoring by quarter: 15–18, 24–13, 14–22, 11–18
YouTube	Pts: Nichols 25; Rebs: Koch, Ratinho 6 Asts: Ratinho 5	boxscore report	Pts: Williams 23; Rebs: Hassan 9 Asts: Williams 5	Arena: Ponds Forge; Attendance: 500; Referees: Josh Bowe, Steve Ellis, Jon Paul Heron

28 December 2022 14	Plymouth City Patriots	70–96	Bristol Flyers	Plymouth
19:30	Scoring by quarter: 13–17, 21–22, 14–28, 22–29
YouTube	Pts: Williams 31; Rebs: Hassan 7 Asts: Dusha 6	boxscore report	Pts: Bell III, Olison 17; Rebs: Bell III, Miller, Smith 8 Asts: Watson-Gayle 7	Arena: Plymouth Pavilions; Attendance: not available Referees: Joe Hodgson, Andy Thackray, Ian Spearman

30 December 2022 14	London Lions	87–63	Plymouth City Patriots	London
19:30	Scoring by quarter: 25–14, 22–19, 20–24, 20–16
YouTube	Pts: Nelson 19; Rebs: Ward-Hibbert 12; Asts: Taylor 6	boxscore report	Pts: Williams 26; Rebs: Bell 9 Asts: Dusha, Hawthorne Jr., Keita, Williams 2	Arena: Copper Box Arena; Attendance: 3000; Referees: Gavin Williams, Tahir Akar, Ian Atkins

8 January 2023 15	Cheshire Phoenix	101–82	Plymouth City Patriots	Ellesmere Port
17:30	Scoring by quarter: 35–23, 24–18, 26–13, 16–28
YouTube	Pts: Teague 21; Rebs: Teague 10; Asts: Austin Jr., Evans 6	boxscore report	Pts: Simons 32; Rebs: Bell, Hassan, Keita 7 Asts: Dusha 6	Arena: Cheshire Oaks Arena; Attendance: not available Referees: Joe Hodgson, Simon Unsworth, Steve Ferris

20 January 2023 16	Caledonia Gladiators	96–80	Plymouth City Patriots	Glasgow
19:30	Scoring by quarter: 24–18, 17–16, 25–18, 30–28
YouTube	Pts: Sloan 29; Rebs: Tapé 9 Asts: Onwas, Sloan, Tapé 5	boxscore report	Pts: Bell, Daniels 14; Rebs: Daniels, Hassan 5 Asts: Gadsden 4	Arena: Emirates Arena; Attendance: 400; Referees: Chris Dodds, Bartek Rasinski, Nick Nassi

27 January 2023 17	Sheffield Sharks	82–77	Plymouth City Patriots	Sheffield
19:30	Scoring by quarter: 19–21, 23–16, 16–18, 24–22
YouTube	Pts: Flowers 15; Rebs: Koch 8 Asts: Nelson 5	boxscore report	Pts: Gadsden 18; Rebs: Brandon 9 Asts: Brandon 5	Arena: Ponds Forge; Attendance: not available Referees: Josh Bowe, Paul Unsworth, Pawel Szafraniec

3 February 2023 18	Plymouth City Patriots	93–108	Bristol Flyers	Plymouth
19:30	Scoring by quarter: 13–30, 24–29, 27–23, 29–26
YouTube	Pts: Hassan 32; Rebs: Brandon 6 Asts: Dusha 7	boxscore report	Pts: King 30; Rebs: Delpeche 9 Asts: Miller 9	Arena: Plymouth Pavilions; Attendance: not available Referees: Gavin Williams, Andy Thackray, Ian Spearman

5 February 2023 18	Plymouth City Patriots	79–88	London Lions	Plymouth
15:00	Scoring by quarter: 16–16, 16–27, 20–24, 27–21
YouTube	Pts: Hassan 25; Rebs: Daniels 7 Asts: Dusha 4	boxscore report	Pts: Zubčić 21; Rebs: Soko 8 Asts: Zubčić 8	Arena: Plymouth Pavilions; Attendance: not available Referees: Gavin Williams, Tahir Akar, Beyti Ozgur

17 February 2023 20	Surrey Scorchers	95–105(OT)	Plymouth City Patriots	Guildford
19:30	Scoring by quarter: 26–18, 22–25, 15–21, 24–23, Overtime: 8–18
YouTube	Pts: Carey 33; Rebs: Martin 10; Asts: Wang 11	boxscore report	Pts: Gadsden 32; Rebs: Hawthorne Jr. 9 Asts: Dusha 6	Arena: Surrey Sports Park; Attendance: 950; Referees: Simon Unsworth, Kevin Kinsella, Michael Diamond-Hunter

19 February 2023 20	Plymouth City Patriots	98–93(OT)	Newcastle Eagles	Plymouth
15:00	Scoring by quarter: 27–22, 26–22, 15–16, 16–24, Overtime: 14–9
YouTube	Pts: Gadsden 28; Rebs: Hassan 12; Asts: Dang-Akodo 6	boxscore report	Pts: Johnson 20; Rebs: French 19; Asts: French 6	Arena: Plymouth Pavilions; Attendance: not available Referees: Gavin Williams, Andy Thackray, Ian Spearman

26 February 2023 21	Plymouth City Patriots	77–87	Manchester Giants	Plymouth
15:00	Scoring by quarter: 23–19, 20–22, 18–22, 16–26
YouTube	Pts: Hassan 19; Rebs: Hassan 10; Asts: Dusha 11	boxscore report	Pts: Williams 23; Rebs: Green, Roberson 9 Asts: Fletcher 8	Arena: Plymouth Pavilions; Attendance: not available Referees: Andy Thackray, Joe Hodgson, Kevin Kinsella

12 March 2023 23	Plymouth City Patriots	51–102	London Lions	Plymouth
15:00	Scoring by quarter: 10–21, 15–29, 15–22, 11–30
YouTube	Pts: Hassan 20; Rebs: Iyekekpolor 12; Asts: Dusha 5	boxscore report	Pts: Dekker 18; Rebs: Ward-Hibbert 8 Asts: Dekker 8	Arena: Plymouth Pavilions; Attendance: 1,000; Referees: David Griffin, Ian Spearman, Harvey West

17 March 2023 24	Bristol Flyers	99–60	Plymouth City Patriots	Bristol
19:30	Scoring by quarter: 25–7, 29–13, 17–20, 28–20
YouTube	Pts: Olinson 23; Rebs: Bell III 8 Asts: Watson-Gayle 9	boxscore report	Pts: Brandon 12; Rebs: Hassan 8 Asts: Hassan 3	Arena: SGS College Arena; Attendance: 750; Referees: David Griffin, Andy Thackray, Tahir Akar

19 March 2023 24	Plymouth City Patriots	67–90	Cheshire Phoenix	Plymouth
15:00	Scoring by quarter: 22–19, 17–23, 14–23, 14–25
YouTube	Pts: Dang-Akodo 11; Rebs: Iyekekpolor 10; Asts: Dusha 5	boxscore report	Pts: Austin Jr., Neighbour 17; Rebs: Austin Jr., Evans 8 Asts: Austin Jr., Jamell Anderson 5	Arena: Plymouth Pavilions; Attendance: not available Referees: Andy Thackray, Joe Hodgson, Ian Spearman

28 March 2023 26	Leicester Riders	92–89	Plymouth City Patriots	Leicester
19:45	Scoring by quarter: 30–22, 20–21, 19–19, 23–27
YouTube	Pts: Loving 24; Rebs: Menzies, Whelan 7 Asts: Love 9	boxscore report	Pts: Hassan 21; Rebs: Bissainthe 8 Asts: Dang-Akodo, Dusha 4	Arena: Morningside Arena; Attendance: 666; Referees: Hoj Fozi, Kevin Kinsella, Keith Williams

31 March 2023 26	Manchester Giants	109–69	Plymouth City Patriots	Manchester
19:30	Scoring by quarter: 25–18, 35–23, 34–21, 15–7
YouTube	Pts: Fletcher 25; Rebs: Green 17; Asts: Green 10	boxscore report	Pts: Hassan 17; Rebs: Hassan 9 Asts: Dusha 5	Arena: National Basketball Performance Centre; Attendance: 400; Referees: Paul Unsworth, Steve Ellis, Matthew Lloyd

2 April 2023 26	Plymouth City Patriots	85–99	Leicester Riders	Plymouth
15:00	Scoring by quarter: 16–25, 23–21, 24–28, 22–25
YouTube	Pts: Dusha 19; Rebs: Hassan, Hawthorne, Jr. 7 Asts: Dusha 4	boxscore report	Pts: Jackson 24; Rebs: Loving 8 Asts: Love 6	Arena: Plymouth Pavilions; Attendance: not available Referees: Andy Thackray, Tahir Akar, Beyti Ozgur

8 April 2023 27	Surrey Scorchers	87–89	Plymouth City Patriots	Guildford
18:00	Scoring by quarter: 25–23, 21–20, 17–27, 24–19
YouTube	Pts: Dobbs, McFolley 18; Rebs: Johnson 7 Asts: Lawrence 6	boxscore report	Pts: Hassan 28; Rebs: Bissainthe, Hassan 8 Asts: Dusha 11	Arena: Surrey Sports Park; Attendance: 1,000; Referees: Andy Thackray, Rob Hickman, Harvey West

9 April 2023 27	Plymouth City Patriots	80–85	Caledonia Gladiators	Plymouth
15:00	Scoring by quarter: 20–19, 23–21, 19–21, 18–24
YouTube	Pts: Hassan 18; Rebs: Hassan 7 Asts: Dusha 7	boxscore report	Pts: Durham 24; Rebs: Alihodžić 11; Asts: Sloan 6	Arena: Plymouth Pavilions; Attendance: not available Referees: Gavin Williams, David Griffin, Ian Spearman

14 April 2023 28	Leicester Riders	111–68	Plymouth City Patriots	Leicester
19:45	Scoring by quarter: 23–15, 33–18, 25–15, 30–20
YouTube	Pts: Whelan 22; Rebs: Loving 9 Asts: Love 9	boxscore report	Pts: Hassan 25; Rebs: Hassan 12; Asts: Dang-Akodo 6	Arena: Morningside Arena; Attendance: not available Referees: Steve Ferris, Kevin Kinsella, Firooz Dehdarvand

16 April 2023 28	Plymouth City Patriots	68–85	Cheshire Phoenix	Plymouth
15:00	Scoring by quarter: 19–22, 17–14, 16–26, 16–23
YouTube	Pts: Bissainthe 13; Rebs: Dusha 9 Asts: Dusha 9	boxscore report	Pts: Austin Jr. 21; Rebs: Austin Jr. 10; Asts: Evans 4	Arena: Plymouth Pavilions; Attendance: not available Referees: Andy Thackray, Tahir Akar, Michael Diamond-Hunter

21 April 2023 29	London Lions	96–62	Plymouth City Patriots	London
19:30	Scoring by quarter: 21–16, 32–8, 18–25, 25–13
YouTube	Pts: Hruban 25; Rebs: Sharma 6 Asts: Taylor 8	boxscore report	Pts: Bissainthe 18; Rebs: Bissainthe, Hassan 7 Asts: Dusha 5	Arena: Copper Box Arena; Attendance: 3,694; Referees: David Griffin, Kevin Kinsella, Hoj Fozi

23 April 2023 29	Plymouth City Patriots	68–90	Newcastle Eagles	Plymouth
15:00	Scoring by quarter: 19–20, 12–27, 17–21, 20–22
YouTube	Pts: Bissainthe, Hassan 18; Rebs: Hassan 9 Asts: Dusha 7	boxscore report	Pts: Johnson 21; Rebs: Gordon 12; Asts: Cohn 8	Arena: Plymouth Pavilions; Attendance: not available Referees: Gavin Williams, Andy Thackray, Ian Spearman

== BBL Cup ==
=== First round ===
9 October 2022	Plymouth City Patriots	75–77	Newcastle Eagles	Plymouth
15:00	Scoring by quarter: 20–21, 19–22, 23–25, 13–9
BBL Player, YouTube	Pts: Hassan 16; Rebs: Brandon 9 Asts: Dusha 8	boxscore report	Pts: Cohn 21; Rebs: Kennedy 7 Asts: Hamlet 7	Arena: Plymouth Pavilions; Attendance: not available Referees: Iain Spearman, Gavin Williams, Firooz Dehdarvand

== BBL Trophy ==
=== First round ===
7 January 2023	Plymouth City Patriots	105–52	St Mirren Saints	Plymouth
19:30	Scoring by quarter: 21–12, 26–20, 39–6, 12–6
BBL Player, YouTube	Pts: Bell, Simons 16; Rebs: Hawthorne Jr., Simons 8 Asts: Brandon, Dusha 6	boxscore report	Pts: Cleary 13; Rebs: Cleary 10; Asts: Carroll 3	Arena: Plymouth Pavilions; Attendance: not available Referees: Eduard Uydansky, Keith Williams, Hoj Fozi

=== Quarterfinals ===
12 February 2023	Plymouth City Patriots	89–99	Derby Trailblazers	Plymouth
15:00	Scoring by quarter: 20–31, 20–24, 28–19, 21–25
YouTube	Pts: Dusha, Hassan 25; Rebs: Hassan 10; Asts: Dusha 6	boxscore report	Pts: Smith 36; Rebs: Dieterich, Donaldson, May-Thompson, Smith 5 Asts: Bruggerman 9	Arena: Plymouth Pavilions; Attendance: not available Referees: Ian Spearman, Gavin Williams, Alexandra Belkner

== Statistics ==
=== BBL Championship ===
Player	GP	MPG	2FG%	3FG%	FT%	RPG	APG	SPG	BPG	PPG
Markedric Bell	23	26.34	51.25%	32.69%	73.47%	4.83	1.22	0.48	1.43	10.91
Ralph Bissainthe	12	27.45	45.95%	29.03%	58.33%	5.67	1.75	1.08	0.08	12.50
Isa Brandon	35	24.52	41.26%	40.63%	82.28%	4.51	2.31	1.37	0.51	7.46
Jules Dang-Akodo	19	23.42	40.68%	33.75%	96.15%	2.21	3.00	0.74	0.11	8.11
Jawaun Daniels	4	26.71	45.16%	22.73%	81.82%	4.75	1.00	1.00	0	13.00
Elvisi Dusha	36	31.75	42.48%	34.38%	87.21%	3.17	6.06	1.14	0.19	10.28
Daniel Fawell-Molloy	1	1.47	0%	0%	0%	0	0	0	0	0
Ty Gadsden	16	25.23	45.45%	30.88%	80.95%	2.63	1.94	0.94	0	12.56
Rashad Hassan	36	28.38	60.67%	0%	54.72%	7.06	1.08	0.39	0.50	15.67
James Hawthorne Jr.	32	19.59	53.06%	21.88%	68.57%	4.69	0.72	0.47	0.84	7.69
Otas Iyekekpolor	12	26.66	42.62%	23.33%	62.96%	6.00	0.75	0.33	0.33	7.50
Sam Keita	34	7.20	40.48%	0%	39.02%	1.88	0.35	0.24	0.03	1.47
Patrick Lanipekun	30	10.80	31.25%	16.33%	65.00%	0.93	0.47	0.13	0	1.90
Briceny Lomeka	4	1.23	0%	0%	0%	0.25	0	0	0	0
Troy Simons	12	27.19	42.86%	29.58%	70.97%	3.83	2.17	1.50	0.50	11.08
Romario Spence	2	7.61	50.00%	0%	100.00%	3.00	1.00	0	0	2.00
Will White	6	7.79	66.67%	0%	0%	0.33	0	0	0	0.67
Antonio Williams	13	32.82	52.60%	34.21%	67.06%	4.69	4.69	1.69	0.54	19.85

Source: BritHoops.com

=== All Competitions ===
Statistics for all competitions including BBL Championship, BBL Cup, BBL Trophy and BBL Playoffs.

Player	GP	MPG	2FG%	3FG%	FT%	RPG	APG	SPG	BPG	PPG
Markedric Bell	26	26.14	50.27%	33.33%	72.77%	4.83	1.08	0.54	1.42	13.00
Ralph Bissainthe	12	27.45	45.95%	29.03%	58.33%	5.67	1.75	1.08	0.08	12.50
Isa Brandon	38	24.60	42.48%	41.77%	82.14%	4.63	2.42	1.34	0.55	7.84
Jules Dang-Akodo	20	23.73	40.00%	34.52%	96.15%	2.20	3.10	0.70	0.10	8.00
Jawaun Daniels	4	26.71	45.16%	22.73%	81.82%	4.75	1.00	1.00	0	13.00
Elvisi Dusha	39	31.72	42.92%	36.11%	86.67%	3.36	6.10	1.15	0.18	10.59
Daniel Fawell-Molloy	2	4.01	100.00%	0%	0%	2.00	0.50	0.50	0	1.00
Ty Gadsden	17	25.48	43.75%	32.89%	80.95%	2.71	2.00	0.88	0	12.53
Rashad Hassan	39	27.80	61.35%	0%	55.26%	7.05	1.08	0.38	0.49	15.62
James Hawthorne Jr.	35	19.42	53.09%	21.13%	68.42%	4.80	0.83	0.43	0.80	7.69
Otas Iyekekpolor	12	26.66	42.62%	23.33%	62.96%	6.00	0.75	0.33	0.33	7.50
Sam Keita	37	7.69	48.08%	0%	35.56%	1.97	0.35	0.27	0.05	1.78
Patrick Lanipekun	33	11.11	32.35%	18.33%	65.00%	1.12	0.55	0.18	0	2.06
Briceny Lomeka	5	2.84	50.00%	0%	0%	0.40	0	0	0	0.40
Troy Simons	14	27.53	43.75%	31.40%	75.00%	3.93	2.43	1.86	0.50	11.71
Romario Spence	2	7.61	50.00%	0%	100.00%	3.00	1.00	0	0	2.00
Will White	8	8.78	66.67%	16.67%	100.00%	0.38	0.13	0.13	0	1.63
Antonio Williams	13	32.82	52.60%	34.21%	67.06%	4.69	4.69	1.69	0.54	19.85

Source: BritHoops.com
