= 2023–24 Plymouth City Patriots season =

- Head coach: (United Kingdom) Paul James
- Captain: (Albania) Elvisi Dusha
- Arena: Plymouth Pavilions

BBL results
- Record: 4–20 (.167)
- Ladder: 10th
- BBL Trophy: Group stage
- Playoff finish: TBD
- Stats at BBL.org.uk
- All statistics correct as of 19 November 2023.

The 2023–24 Plymouth City Patriots season is the 3rd season of the franchise in the British Basketball League (BBL).

== Notable occurrences ==
- A 94–70 home victory over London Lions on 5 November 2023 earned head coach Paul James his 500th career win as a Head Coach of a British Basketball League team.
- On 21 November the club announced that chairman Carl Heslop – a leading figure in the foundation of the club in 2021 – had resigned from his position due to other business commitments.
- On 13 January 2024, Patriots played their 100th competitive game since foundation in 2021. The team lost narrowly, 63–65, to the visiting Surrey Scorchers.

== Players ==
=== Squad information ===
Note: Flags indicate national team eligibility at FIBA-sanctioned events. Players may hold other non-FIBA nationalities not displayed.

Plymouth City Patriots roster
Players
Coaches

Pos.	No.	Nat.	Name	Ht.	Wt.	Age
G/F	0	(United States)	Copeland, Cameron	2.01 m (6 ft 7 in)	84 kg (185 lb)	25 – 15 March 2000
SG	1	(United Kingdom)	Lomeka, Briceny (TW)	1.96 m (6 ft 5 in)	100 kg (220 lb)
F	3	(United States)	Wiley, Jacob	2.01 m (6 ft 7 in)	95 kg (209 lb)	27 – 16 September 1998
G/F	6	(Canada)	Bellott-Green, Tyrell	2.01 m (6 ft 7 in)	98 kg (216 lb)	30 – 6 October 1995
SG	9	(United States)	Faulkner, Mason	1.86 m (6 ft 1 in)	86 kg (190 lb)	27 – 11 June 1998
F/C	10	(United States)	Levi, Spencer	2.03 m (6 ft 8 in)	100 kg (220 lb)	26 – 11 April 1999
PG	12	(Albania)	Dusha, Elvisi (C)	1.88 m (6 ft 2 in)	82 kg (181 lb)	31 – 15 July 1994
SF	13	(United Kingdom)	Hart, Joseph	1.94 m (6 ft 4 in)	93 kg (205 lb)	29 – 10 January 1996
SF	15	(United States)	Atwood, T.J.	1.98 m (6 ft 6 in)	92 kg (203 lb)	28 – 4 November 1997
PG	17	(United Kingdom)	Dang-Akodo, Jules	1.91 m (6 ft 3 in)	84 kg (185 lb)	29 – 2 May 1996
F	24	(United Kingdom)	White, Will (TW)	1.91 m (6 ft 3 in)

Head coach

- (United Kingdom) Paul James

Assistant coach(es)

- (United Kingdom) Will Hopper

Legend

- (C) Team captain
- (TW) Two-way affiliate player with
  Plymouth Marjon University
- Injured

- Roster
Updated: 5 February 2024

=== Depth chart ===
Pos.	Starting 5	Bench 1	Bench 2
C	Spencer Levi
PF	Jacob Wiley	Tyrell Bellot-Green	Will White
SF	T.J. Atwood	Joseph Hart
SG	Mason Faulkner	Cameron Copeland	Briceny Lomeka
PG	Elvisi Dusha	Jules Dang-Akodo

=== Transactions ===
==== In ====
No.	Pos.	Nat.	Name	Age	Moving from		Date	Source
11	G	(United States)	Taylor Johnson	28	Hemel Storm	(United Kingdom)	19 July 2023	
9	SG	(United States)	Mason Faulkner	25	Free agent	(United States)	19 July 2023	
2	F	(United States)	D'Andre Johnson	25	Free agent	(United States)	25 July 2023	
4	PF	(United States)	Mekhii Noble	23	Florida Tech Panthers	(United States)	29 July 2023	
15	SF	(United States)	T.J. Atwood	25	Iskra Svit	(Slovakia)	31 July 2023	
3	F	(United States)	Jacob Wiley	24	N.E. Megaridos	(Greece)	20 August 2023	
5	F/C	(United Kingdom)	Charles Yassi-Pepin	26	Free agent	(United Kingdom)	14 September 2023	
10	F/C	(United States)	Spencer Levi	24	BC Vienna	(Austria)	23 October 2023	
6	G/F	(Canada)	Tyrell Bellot-Green	28	Brampton Honey Badgers	(Canada)	27 October 2023	
0	G/F	(United States)	Cameron Copeland	23	Imortal Albufeira	(Portugal)	15 January 2024	

==== Out ====
No.	Pos.	Nat.	Name	Age	Moving to		Date	Source
11	PG	(United States)	Ty Gadsden	26	Free agent	(United States)	May 2023	
22	F/C	(United States)	Rashad Hassan	33	Free agent	(United States)	May 2023	
2	F	(United States)	James Hawthorne Jr.	26	Free agent	(United States)	May 2023	
13	F	(Canada)	Otas Iyekekpolor	26	Free agent	(United States)	May 2023	
15	C	(United Kingdom)	Samuel Keita	23	Free agent	(United Kingdom)	May 2023	
9	G	(United Kingdom)	Patrick Lanipekun	24	CB Aridane	(Spain)	5 August 2023	
1	SF	(United States)	Ralph Bissainthe	24	KK Alkar	(Croatia)	16 September 2023	
0	SG	(United Kingdom)	Isa Brandon	26	Solent Kestrels	(United Kingdom)	16 September 2023	
4	PF	(United States)	Mekhii Noble	24	Free agent	(United States)	18 October 2023	
2	F	(United States)	D'Andre Johnson	25	Free agent	(United States)	24 October 2023	
11	G	(United States)	Taylor Johnson	29	Free agent	(United States)	13 December 2023	
5	F/C	(United Kingdom)	Charles Yassi-Pepin	26	Free agent	(United Kingdom)	18 January 2024	

== Pre-season and friendlies ==
1 September 2023	Surrey Scorchers	93–97	Plymouth City Patriots	Guildford
19:30	Scoring by quarter: 24–33, 27–19, 21–32, 21–13
				Arena: Surrey Sports Park; Attendance: not available

== Competitions ==
Competition	First match	Last match	Starting round	Final position	Record							
Competition	First match	Last match	Starting round	Final position	Pld	W	D	L	PF	PA	PD	Win %
BBL Championship	15 September 2023	20 April 2024	Round 1						—			
BBL Trophy	7 January 2024	20 January 2024	Group Stage	5th	4	1	0	3	298	325	−27	25.00
BBL Playoffs									—			
Total					4	1	0	3	298	325	−27	25.00

Source: Competitions

== BBL Championship ==
=== Standings ===
Pos	Team	Pld	W	L	PF	PA	PD	Pts	Qualification
1	London Lions (C)	36	33	3	3376	2935	+441	66	Playoffs
2	Cheshire Phoenix	36	23	13	3334	3148	+186	46	Playoffs
3	Caledonia Gladiators	36	23	13	3152	3044	+108	46	Playoffs
4	Sheffield Sharks	36	19	17	2930	2849	+81	38	Playoffs
5	Leicester Riders	36	18	18	3281	3291	−10	36	Playoffs
6	Newcastle Eagles	36	18	18	3256	3177	+79	36	Playoffs
7	Bristol Flyers	36	16	20	2925	2918	+7	32	Playoffs
8	Surrey Scorchers	36	14	22	2955	3092	−137	28	Playoffs
9	Manchester Giants	36	9	27	2920	3311	−391	18	
10	Plymouth City Patriots	36	7	29	2887	3251	−364	14	

Updated to match(es) played on 21 April 2024. Source: BBC Sport
(C) Champions

Leader and qualification to playoffs
Qualification to playoffs
Last place

2023–24 BBL Championship
Team ╲ Round	1	2	3	4	5	6	7	8	9	10	11	12	13	14	15	16	17	18	19	20	21	22	23	24	25	26	27
Bristol Flyers	4	4	8	4	3	2	2	2	3	4	6	6	4	5	6	6	7	7	7	8	7	7	8	7	7	7	7
Caledonia Gladiators	3	6	6	6	6	4	3	4	4	5	5	3	3	2	2	2	2	3	3	3	3	3	3	3	3	3	3
Cheshire Phoenix	1	3	5	3	5	3	4	3	2	2	2	2	2	3	3	3	3	2	2	2	2	2	2	2	2	2	2
Leicester Riders	10	7	3	2	2	5	5	5	6	7	7	7	7	7	7	7	4	4	5	4	5	5	5	5	6	5	5
London Lions	2	1	1	1	1	1	1	1	1	1	1	1	1	1	1	1	1	1	1	1	1	1	1	1	1	1	1
Manchester Giants	8	10	7	8	8	8	8	9	9	9	9	9	9	9	9	9	9	9	9	9	9	9	9	9	10	9	9
Newcastle Eagles	5	2	2	7	7	7	7	7	7	6	4	5	6	4	5	4	6	5	4	5	4	4	4	4	4	6	5
Plymouth City Patriots	7	9	9	9	9	10	10	10	10	10	10	10	10	10	10	10	10	10	10	10	10	10	10	10	9	10	10
Sheffield Sharks	6	5	4	5	4	6	6	6	5	3	3	4	5	6	4	5	5	6	6	6	6	6	6	6	5	4	4
Surrey Scorchers	9	8	10	10	10	9	9	8	8	8	8	8	8	8	8	8	8	8	8	7	8	8	7	8	8	8	8

Updated to match(es) played on 21 April 2024. Source: BBL.org.uk

=== Matches ===
15 September 2023 1	Bristol Flyers	82–65	Plymouth City Patriots	Bristol
19:30	Scoring by quarter: 21–15, 18–10, 23–12, 20–28
YouTube	Pts: Greene 23; Rebs: Greene 10; Asts: Johnson 6	boxscore report	Pts: Atwood, T. Johnson 17; Rebs: T. Johnson, Noble 7 Asts: Dusha 8	Arena: SGS College Arena; Attendance: 770; Referees: Gavin Williams, Joe Hodgson, Tahir Akar

22 September 2023 2	Leicester Riders	88–81	Plymouth City Patriots	Leicester
19:45	Scoring by quarter: 18–17, 25–35, 16–13, 29–16
YouTube	Pts: Lall 14; Rebs: Holmes, Thomas 6 Asts: Mackenzie, Pinson 5	boxscore report	Pts: Atwood, Faulkner 20; Rebs: Atwood 7 Asts: Faulkner 5	Arena: Morningside Arena; Attendance: 880; Referees: Paul Unsworth, Steve Ellis, Kevin Kinsella

29 September 2023 3	Plymouth City Patriots	73–77	Manchester Giants	Plymouth
19:30	Scoring by quarter: 24–16, 8–20, 20–21, 21–20
YouTube	Pts: Faulkner 20; Rebs: Atwood 9 Asts: T. Johnson 6	boxscore report	Pts: Anderson 19; Rebs: Stampley 11; Asts: Harris 5	Arena: Plymouth Pavilions; Attendance: not available Referees: Gavin Williams, Ian Spearman, Alexandra Belkner

1 October 2023 3	Plymouth City Patriots	92–87	Sheffield Sharks	Plymouth
15:00	Scoring by quarter: 18–18, 28–11, 22–30, 24–28
YouTube	Pts: Faulkner 24; Rebs: Atwood 8 Asts: Dang-Akodo 5	boxscore report	Pts: Eytle-Rock 20; Rebs: Adekoya, Nichols 6 Asts: Adekoya 5	Arena: Plymouth Pavilions; Attendance: not available Referees: Gavin Williams, David Griffin, Harvey West

8 October 2023 4	Plymouth City Patriots	63–92	Bristol Flyers	Plymouth
18:00	Scoring by quarter: 24–17, 10–19, 12–27, 17–19
YouTube	Pts: Atwood 30; Rebs: Atwood 12; Asts: Faulkner 10	boxscore report	Pts: Graham-Bell 19; Rebs: Greene 13; Asts: Lucas 6	Arena: Plymouth Pavilions; Attendance: not available Referees: Gavin Williams, Ian Spearman, Alexandra Belkner

12 October 2023 5	Caledonia Gladiators	99–83	Plymouth City Patriots	East Kilbride
19:45	Scoring by quarter: 24–27, 27–15, 33–27, 15–14
YouTube	Pts: DuBose 20; Rebs: Alihodžić, Moore Jr. 8 Asts: Whelan 5	boxscore report	Pts: Atwood, T. Johnson 26; Rebs: Atwood 8 Asts: Faulkner 7	Arena: Playsport Arena; Attendance: 400; Referees: Iain Macdonald, Mariann Dodds-Miklosik, Bartek Rasinski

14 October 2023 5	Plymouth City Patriots	68–92	Bristol Flyers	Plymouth
17:00	Scoring by quarter: 14–28, 12–20, 20–28, 22–16
YouTube	Pts: Atwood, D. Johnson 14; Rebs: Atwood 6 Asts: Hart 6	boxscore report	Pts: Olison 23; Rebs: Greene 9 Asts: Lucas 7	Arena: Plymouth Pavilions; Attendance: not available Referees: Eduard Udyanskyy, Kevin Kinsella, Joe Hodgson

22 October 2023 6	Cheshire Phoenix	89–77	Plymouth City Patriots	Ellesmere Port
18:00	Scoring by quarter: 19–20, 28–18, 17–19, 25–20
YouTube	Pts: Chargois 22; Rebs: Chagois 8 Asts: Rideau 12	boxscore report	Pts: T. Johnson 20; Rebs: Atwood 9 Asts: Faulkner 9	Arena: Cheshire Oaks Arena; Attendance: not available Referees: Iain Macdonald, Steve Ferris, Mariann Dodds-Miklosik

25 October 2023 7	Plymouth City Patriots	55–67	Sheffield Sharks	Plymouth
19:30	Scoring by quarter: 13–17, 15–15, 15–19, 12–16
YouTube	Pts: Faulkner 14; Rebs: Wiley 10; Asts: T. Johnson 3	boxscore report	Pts: Koch 17; Rebs: Allen 8 Asts: Nichols 5	Arena: Plymouth Pavilions; Attendance: not available Referees: Paul Unsworth, Ian Spearman, Harvey West

29 October 2023 7	Plymouth City Patriots	105–110	Surrey Scorchers	Plymouth
15:00	Scoring by quarter: 15–20, 24–27, 28–23, 15–20
YouTube	Pts: T. Johnson 24; Rebs: Levi 12; Asts: T. Johnson 5	boxscore report	Pts: Wang 22; Rebs: Jamison 8 Asts: Cooden 4	Arena: Plymouth Pavilions; Attendance: not available Referees: Gavin Williams, Tahir Akar, Firooz Dehdarvand

3 November 2023 8	Plymouth City Patriots	72–82	Caledonia Gladiators	Plymouth
19:30	Scoring by quarter: 13–21, 20–14, 21–23, 18–24
YouTube	Pts: Wiley 21; Rebs: Wiley 9 Asts: Faulkner 5	boxscore report	Pts: Alihodžić 19; Rebs: Buttrick 16; Asts: Alihodžić 4	Arena: Plymouth Pavilions; Attendance: not available Referees: Josh Bowe, Ian Spearman, Alexandra Belkner

5 November 2023 8	Plymouth City Patriots	94–70	London Lions	Plymouth
18:00	Scoring by quarter: 28–15, 28–20, 16–23, 22–12
YouTube	Pts: T. Johnson 24; Rebs: Levi 13; Asts: Hart 5	boxscore report	Pts: Kaboza 21; Rebs: Grantham 7 Asts: Soluade 4	Arena: Plymouth Pavilions; Attendance: not available Referees: Gavin Williams, Ian Spearman, Alexandra Belkner

12 November 2023 9	Plymouth City Patriots	68–95	Newcastle Eagles	Plymouth
15:00	Scoring by quarter: 12–25, 16–13, 22–27, 18–30
YouTube	Pts: T. Johnson 18; Rebs: T. Johnson, Wiley 7 Asts: Dusha 7	boxscore report	Pts: McGill 23; Rebs: Ward-Hibbert 11; Asts: McGill 9	Arena: Plymouth Pavilions; Attendance: not available Referees: Eduard Udyanskyy, Rob Hickman, Harvey West

17 November 2023 10	Newcastle Eagles	98–82	Plymouth City Patriots	Newcastle upon Tyne
19:45	Scoring by quarter: 28–23, 22–22, 28–18, 20–19
Sky Sports, YouTube	Pts: Johnson 24; Rebs: Ward-Hibbert 9 Asts: Johnson 13	boxscore report	Pts: Green 23; Rebs: Atwood 10; Asts: Atwood, Dusha 6	Arena: Vertu Motors Arena; Attendance: not available Referees: Iain Macdonald, Chris Dodds, Neil McKelvey

24 November 2023 11	Manchester Giants	91–90	Plymouth City Patriots	Manchester
19:45	Scoring by quarter: 20–32, 25–20, 23–18, 23–20
YouTube	Pts: Lewis 20; Rebs: Lee 11; Asts: Bourcier 7	boxscore report	Pts: T. Johnson 28; Rebs: Levi 12; Asts: Dusha, T. Johnson 5	Arena: National Basketball Performance Centre; Attendance: not available Referees: Paul Unsworth, Steve Ferris, Bartek Rasinski

26 November 2023 11	Plymouth City Patriots	63–65	Surrey Scorchers	Plymouth
16:30	Scoring by quarter: 19–16, 16–14, 11–23, 17–12
YouTube	Pts: Green 24; Rebs: Levi 11; Asts: Dang-Akodo 4	boxscore report	Pts: Lawrence, Robinson 13; Rebs: Jamison 10; Asts: Jamison, Lawrence 3	Arena: Plymouth Pavilions; Attendance: not available Referees: Gavin Williams, Ian Spearman, Beyti Ozgur

8 December 2023 13	London Lions	91–84	Plymouth City Patriots	London
19:30	Scoring by quarter: 22–23, 23–14, 22–24, 24–23
YouTube	Pts: M. Morgan 27; Rebs: Sandy 8 Asts: Taylor 5	boxscore report	Pts: Faulkner 18; Rebs: Atwood 9 Asts: Faulkner 7	Arena: Copper Box Arena; Attendance: 1304; Referees: Eduard Udyanskyy, Kevin Kinsella, Alejandro Martinez Naya

22 December 2023 15	Surrey Scorchers	71–65	Plymouth City Patriots	Guildford
19:30	Scoring by quarter: 21–22, 25–4, 11–16, 14–13
YouTube	Pts: Jamison 15; Rebs: Jamison 7 Asts: Lawrence 7	boxscore report	Pts: Wiley 20; Rebs: Atwood, Levi 7 Asts: Dusha 7	Arena: Surrey Sports Park; Attendance: not available Referees: Rob Hickman, Gavin Williams, Daniel Cox

23 December 2023 15	Plymouth City Patriots	87–80	Caledonia Gladiators	Plymouth
20:00	Scoring by quarter: 21–17, 25–15, 22–23, 19–25
YouTube	Pts: Atwood 25; Rebs: Levi 12; Asts: Faulkner 6	boxscore report	Pts: Whelan 17; Rebs: Whelan 7 Asts: Bothwell, DuBose 4	Arena: Plymouth Pavilions; Attendance: not available Referees: Joe Hodgson, Harvey West, Alexandra Belkner

28 December 2023 16	Newcastle Eagles	95–82	Plymouth City Patriots	Newcastle upon Tyne
19:30	Scoring by quarter: 24–17, 25–25, 24–23, 22–17
YouTube	Pts: Green 31; Rebs: Austin Jr., Green 9 Asts: McGill 10	boxscore report	Pts: Atwood 27; Rebs: Atwood 10; Asts: Dusha 6	Arena: Vertu Motors Arena; Attendance: not available Referees: Iain Macdonald, Matthew Lloyd, Jonpaul Heron

1 February 2024 17	Manchester Giants	79–93	Plymouth City Patriots	Manchester
19:45	Scoring by quarter: 19–22, 26–24, 14–21, 20–26
YouTube	Pts: Lee 26; Rebs: Lee 17; Asts: Bourcier 6	boxscore report	Pts: Wiley 20; Rebs: Levi 14; Asts: Dang-Akodo 6	Arena: National Basketball Performance Centre; Attendance: not available Referees: Paul Unsworth, Josh Bowe, Tom Muddiman

4 February 2024 17	London Lions	105–84	Plymouth City Patriots	London
16:30	Scoring by quarter: 28–25, 25–21, 29–19, 23–19
YouTube	Pts: M. Morgan 19; Rebs: Queeley 6 Asts: Phillip 7	boxscore report	Pts: Faulkner 17; Rebs: Atwood 8 Asts: Faulkner 10	Arena: Copper Box Arena; Attendance: not available Referees: Eduard Udyanskyy, David Griffin, Alejandro Martinez Naya

9 February 2024 18	Leicester Riders	102–81	Plymouth City Patriots	Leicester
19:45	Scoring by quarter: 26–23, 23–20, 20–21, 33–17
YouTube	Pts: Allen 19; Rebs: Idowu 12; Asts: Mackenzie 11	boxscore report	Pts: Wiley 22; Rebs: Atwood, Levi, Wiley 9 Asts: Dusha 8	Arena: Mattioli Arena; Attendance: not available Referees: Steve Ferris, Steve Ellis, Kate Unsworth

10 February 2024 18	Surrey Scorchers	94–92	Plymouth City Patriots	Guildford
17:00	Scoring by quarter: 25–21, 21–2, 24–26, 24–23
YouTube	Pts: Jamison 19; Rebs: Jamison 12; Asts: Lawrence 7	boxscore report	Pts: Atwood 20; Rebs: Levi 7 Asts: Dusha 10	Arena: Surrey Sports Park; Attendance: not available Referees: David Griffin, Tahir Akar, Daniel Cox

16 February 2024 19	Plymouth City Patriots	vs.	Newcastle Eagles	Plymouth
19:30	Scoring by quarter: –, –, –, –
YouTube				Arena: Plymouth Pavilions

18 February 2024 19	Plymouth City Patriots	vs.	Leicester Riders	Plymouth
15:00	Scoring by quarter: –, –, –, –
YouTube				Arena: Plymouth Pavilions

29 February 2024 21	Sheffield Sharks	vs.	Plymouth City Patriots	Sheffield
19:45	Scoring by quarter: –, –, –, –
Sky Sports, YouTube				Arena: Canon Medical Arena

9 March 2024 22	Cheshire Phoenix	vs.	Plymouth City Patriots	Ellesmere Port
17:0	Scoring by quarter: –, –, –, –
YouTube				Arena: Cheshire Oaks Arena

24 March 2024 24	Plymouth City Patriots	vs.	Leicester Riders	Plymouth
18:00	Scoring by quarter: –, –, –, –
YouTube				Arena: Plymouth Pavilions

29 March 2024 25	Plymouth City Patriots	vs.	Cheshire Phoenix	Plymouth
19:30	Scoring by quarter: –, –, –, –
YouTube				Arena: Plymouth Pavilions

30 March 2024 25	Bristol Flyers	vs.	Plymouth City Patriots	Bristol
20:00	Scoring by quarter: –, –, –, –
YouTube				Arena: SGS College Arena

5 April 2024 26	Plymouth City Patriots	vs.	Manchester Giants	Plymouth
19:30	Scoring by quarter: –, –, –, –
YouTube				Arena: Plymouth Pavilions

10 April 2024 27	Plymouth City Patriots	vs.	Cheshire Phoenix	Plymouth
19:30	Scoring by quarter: –, –, –, –
YouTube				Arena: Plymouth Pavilions

12 April 2024 27	Plymouth City Patriots	vs.	London Lions	Plymouth
19:30	Scoring by quarter: –, –, –, –
YouTube				Arena: Plymouth Pavilions

14 April 2024 27	Caledonia Gladiators	vs.	Plymouth City Patriots	East Kilbride
18:00	Scoring by quarter: –, –, –, –
YouTube				Arena: Playsport Arena

20 April 2024 28	Sheffield Sharks	vs.	Plymouth City Patriots	Sheffield
20:00	Scoring by quarter: –, –, –, –
YouTube				Arena: Canon Medical Arena

== BBL Trophy ==
=== Group Stage ===
7 January 2024	Plymouth City Patriots	88–81	Caledonia Gladiators	Plymouth
18:00	Scoring by quarter: 20–19, 21–21, 20–13, 28–28
YouTube	Pts: Wiley 20; Rebs: Levi, Wiley 7 Asts: Dusha 8	boxscore report	Pts: Whelan 18; Rebs: Alihodžić 11; Asts: Bothwell 5	Arena: Plymouth Pavilions; Referees: Keith Williams, Gavin Williams, Ian Spearman

13 January 2024	Plymouth City Patriots	63–65	Surrey Scorchers	Plymouth
20:00	Scoring by quarter: 17–11, 19–18, 18–21, 9–15
YouTube	Pts: Wiley 20; Rebs: Wiley 8 Asts: Faulkner 5	boxscore report	Pts: Jamison 13; Rebs: Jamison 13; Asts: Wang 6	Arena: Plymouth Pavilions; Referees: Gavin Williams, Beyti Ozgur, Harvey West

14 January 2024	Cheshire Phoenix	102–74	Plymouth City Patriots	Ellesmere Port
18:00	Scoring by quarter: 32–17, 25–21, 18–15, 27–21
YouTube	Pts: Chargois, Christon 26; Rebs: Chargois, Christon, Holden 6	boxscore report	Pts: Green 20; Rebs: Dusha, Green, Wiley 5 Asts: Holden 10	Arena: Cheshire Oaks Arena; Attendance: Dusha 4 Referees: Simon Unsworth, Mariann Dodds-Miklosik, Nick Nassi

20 January 2024	Sheffield Sharks	77–73	Plymouth City Patriots	Sheffield
20:00	Scoring by quarter: 23–25, 21–20, 15–20, 18–8
YouTube	Pts: Greene 17; Rebs: Greene, Nixon 7 Asts: Eytle-Rock, Koch 4	boxscore report	Pts: Green 23; Rebs: Copeland, Green 7 Asts: Dusha 6	Arena: Canon Medical Arena; Referees: Kate Unsworth, Josh Bowe, Neil McKelvey

Pos	Team	Pld	W	L	PF	PA	PD	Pts	Qualification	CHE	CAL	SUR	SHE	PLY
1	Cheshire Phoenix	4	4	0	385	304	+81	8	Semifinals	—	—	—	78–70	102–74
2	Caledonia Gladiators	4	2	2	357	334	+23	4	Semifinals	97–100	—	99–74	—	—
3	Surrey Scorchers	4	2	2	293	338	−45	4		63–105	—	—	91–71	—
4	Sheffield Sharks	4	1	3	290	322	−32	2		—	72–80	—	—	77–73
5	Plymouth City Patriots	4	1	3	298	325	−27	2		—	88–81	63–65	—	—

Source: BBL
