= T. J. Atwood =

American basketball player

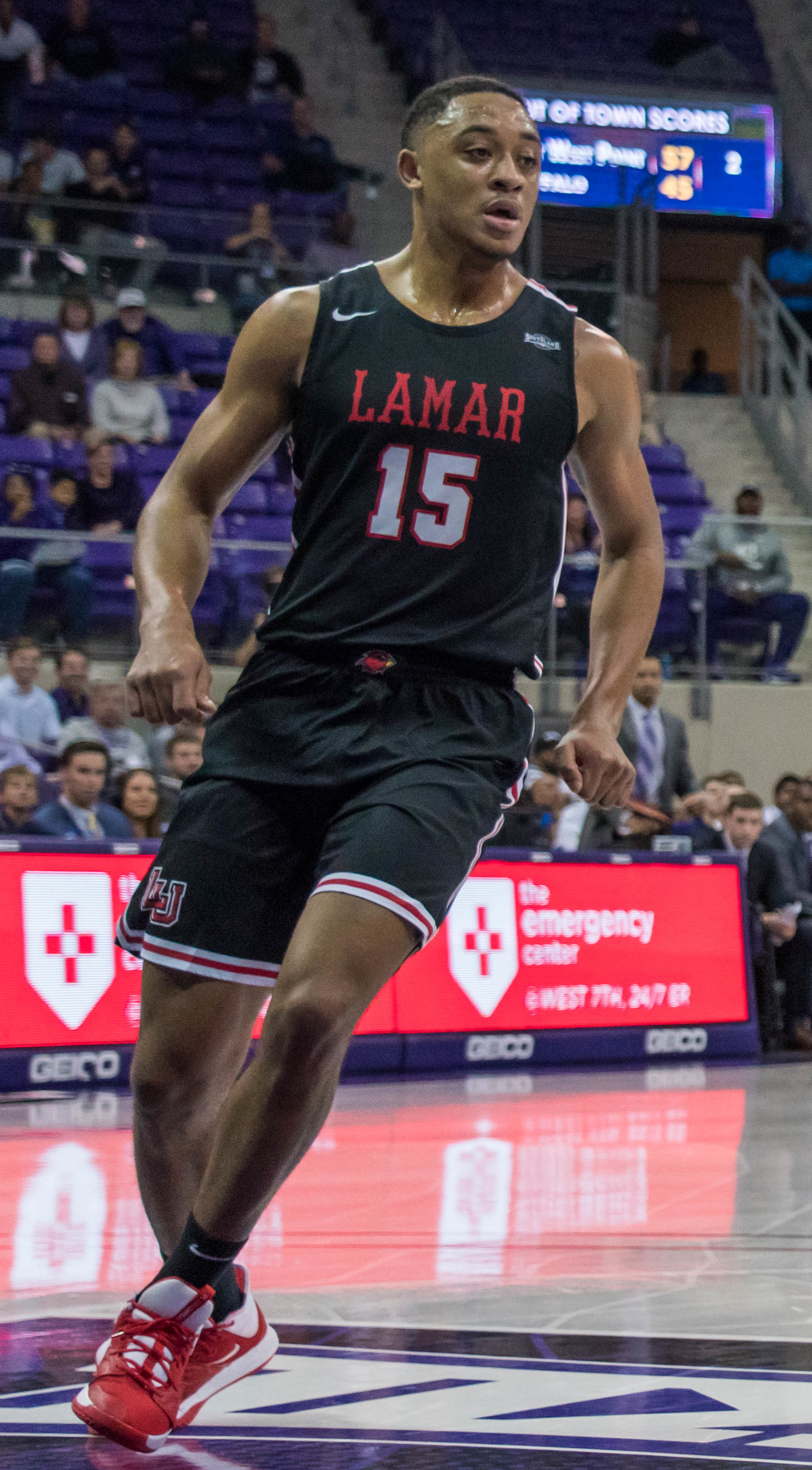
- Atwood with Lamar in 2019

No. 24 – Iskra Svit
- Position: Small forward
- League: Slovak Basketball League

Personal information
- Born: November 4, 1997 (age 28) Beaumont, Texas, U.S.
- Listed height: 6 ft 6 in (1.98 m)
- Listed weight: 205 lb (93 kg)

Career information
- High school: Central (Beaumont, Texas)
- College: Lamar (2016–2020)
- NBA draft: 2020: undrafted
- Playing career: 2020–present

Career history
- 2020: Svendborg Rabbits
- 2021–2022: Depiro Rabat Imtarfa
- 2022–2023: Iskra Svit
- 2023–2024: Plymouth City Patriots
- 2024–2025: Cheshire Phoenix
- 2025–present: Iskra Svit

Career highlights
- Second-team All-Southland (2020)

Tyrin J. Atwood (born November 4, 1997) is an American professional basketball player for Iskra Svit of the Slovak Basketball League.

== Early life and high school career ==
Atwood attended Central High School in Beaumont, Texas. He was a 2015 District 22-5A first-team selection, alongside teammate Nijal Pearson. Atwood committed to Lamar University out of high school.

== College career ==
Atwood was mostly a bench player during his first two seasons at Lamar. On January 26, 2019, Atwood was ruled out for the season after suffering a leg injury during an overtime win over Incarnate Word. He averaged 10.9 points and 5.3 rebounds per game in 19 games as a junior. Atwood scored a career-high 34 points and grabbed 10 rebounds on December 18, in a 79–73 overtime win over Southeastern Louisiana. He was named Southland Conference player of the week on February 24, 2020, after scoring 22 points in a 79–62 win over Texas A&M-Corpus Christi. As a senior, Atwood averaged 16.8 points, 7.0 rebounds, 1.8 assists and 1.4 steals per game, earning Second Team All-Southland honors. Due to the coronavirus pandemic, the season was cancelled following a win against McNeese State in the Southland Tournament. Lamar coach Tic Price called Atwood "one of the classiest guys I ever coached."

== Professional career ==
On July 16, 2020, Atwood signed with the Svendborg Rabbits of the Danish Basketligaen. On January 2, 2021, he signed with Depiro Rabat Imtarfa of the Maltese Division One league. Atwood re-signed with the team on August 2. On 12 November, Atwood was announced as a new signing for Iskra Svit of the Slovak Basketball League. On July 31, 2023, Atwood signed for Plymouth City Patriots of the British Basketball League. He averaged 17 points, seven rebounds and three assists per game and was an All-Star selection. In August 2024, Atwood signed with the Cheshire Phoenix of the Super League Basketball. On November 3, 2025, he rejoined Iskra Svit.
