= Kofi Josephs =

British basketball player

No. 23 – Manchester Giants
- Position: Shooting guard
- League: British Basketball League

Personal information
- Born: 13 September 1991 (age 35) Birmingham, England
- Listed height: 6 ft 6 in (1.98 m)
- Listed weight: 184 lb (83 kg)

Career information
- College: John Brown (2012–2014); Fort Lewis (2014–2016)
- NBA draft: 2016: undrafted
- Playing career: 2016–present

Career history
- 2016–2017: Hertener Löwen
- 2017–2018: Glasgow Rocks
- 2018: BC Boncourt
- 2019: Breiðablik
- 2019: Nässjö Basket
- 2019–2020: Worcester Wolves
- 2021–2022: Plymouth City Patriots
- 2022–2023: Al-Ahli Jeddah
- 2023–present: Manchester Giants

Kofi Omar Josephs (born 13 September 1991) is a British basketball player who last played in the British Basketball League for Manchester Giants. He also plays for the British national team.

== Professional career ==
Josephs spent the 2017–18 season with the Glasgow Rocks and averaged 13.5 points, 3.6 rebounds and 2.2 assists per game. On 21 August 2018, he signed with BC Boncourt.

In January 2019, Josephs signed with Úrvalsdeild karla club Breiðablik. In February 2019, he reached an agreement with Breiðablik to allow him to sign with Nässjö Basket of the Swedish Basketligan. In 7 games with Breiðablik, he averaged 18.1 points per game.

On 24 July 2019, Josephs was unveiled as the first signing of BBL team Worcester Wolves for the 2019–20 season.

In early November 2021, Josephs joined the Plymouth City Patriots after an 18-month hiatus from basketball activities. On 21 November 2021, Josephs scored 46 points in a narrow overtime home loss to the Manchester Giants, the record for the most points scored in a game in BBL history by a British-born player, shooting 15-26 from the field alongside 8 assists, 3 rebounds and 3 steals.

On 2 March 2022, Josephs tended his resignation from the Plymouth City Patriots roster with immediate effect citing personal reasons.

== National team career ==
He participated at the EuroBasket 2017 with the British national team.
