= Liam Langridge-Barker =

British basketball player (born 1999)

No. 17 – Worcester Wolves
- Position: Guard
- League: National Basketball League

Personal information
- Born: 4 December 1999 (age 26) Walton-on-Thames, London, England
- Listed height: 6 ft 6 in (1.98 m)

Career information
- College: Three Rivers Academy (2017–2018); Plymouth Marjon University (2019–2022)
- Playing career: 2018–present

Career history
- 2018–2019: Surrey Scorchers
- 2019–2021: Plymouth Raiders
- 2021–2022: Plymouth City Patriots
- 2022–: Worcester Wolves

Liam Langridge-Barker (born 28 November 1999) is a British professional basketball player who currently plays for the Worcester Wolves.

== College career ==
Langridge-Barker played for the Three Rivers Academy in the Academy Basketball League. In 2017, the school announced a partnership with the Surrey Scorchers to become the club's new youth academy. As a result, Scorchers head coach Creon Raftopoulos also joined the team as assistant coach.
Liam graduated from Three Rivers Academy in 2019, choosing to study for a Business degree at Plymouth Marjon University.

== Professional career ==
In 2018, Raftopoulos signed Langridge-Barker for the Surrey Scorchers in the British Basketball League. Following the end of the 2018–19 season, Liam and the Scorchers parted ways.

Liam has signed with Plymouth Raiders for the 2019–20 (whilst also attending Plymouth Marjon University).
