= Jules Dang-Akodo =

Cameroonian-born British basketball player

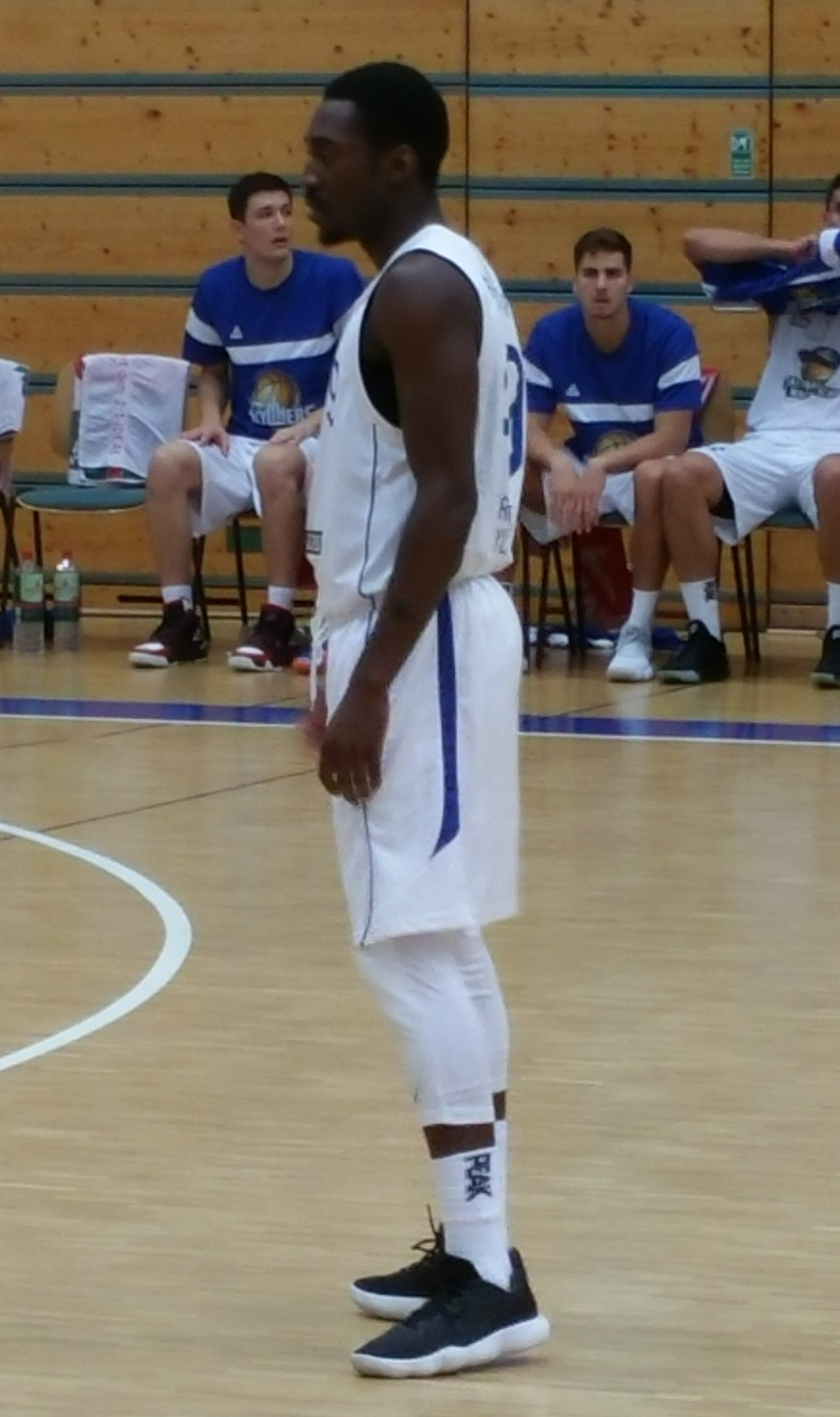

No. 17 – Plymouth City Patriots
- Position: Point guard
- League: BBL

Personal information
- Born: 2 May 1996 (age 30) Yaoundé, Cameroon
- Listed height: 6 ft 3 in (1.91 m)
- Listed weight: 180 lb (82 kg)

Career information
- NBA draft: 2018: undrafted
- Playing career: 2011–present

Career history
- 2011–2014: Union Olimpija
- 2011–2012: →Union Olimpija mladi
- 2014–2015: Skyliners Juniors
- 2015–2016: LTH Castings
- 2016–2017: Burgos 2002
- 2017–2018: Skyliners Frankfurt
- 2017–2018: →Skyliners Juniors
- 2018–2019: London City Royals
- 2019–2021: London Lions
- 2021: Cheshire Phoenix
- 2021–2022: Surrey Scorchers
- 2023–2024: Plymouth City Patriots
- 2024-2025: Bristol Hurricanes

Jules Dang-Akodo (born 2 May 1996) is a Cameroonian-born British basketball player for Plymouth City Patriots and the Great Britain national team.

He participated at the EuroBasket 2017.

On 18 October 2019 Dang-Akodo signed with the London Lions in England for the 2019–20 BBL season. He averaged 7 points and 3 rebounds per game.

On 5 August 2020, he re-signed with the team for the 2020–21 BBL season.

On 3 June 2021, Dang-Akodo signed with Cheshire Phoenix for the 2021–22 BBL season. On 19 November 2021, Dang-Akodo signed with Surrey Scorchers for the remainder of the BBL Championship.
