= Antonio Williams (basketball) =

American basketball player (born 1997)

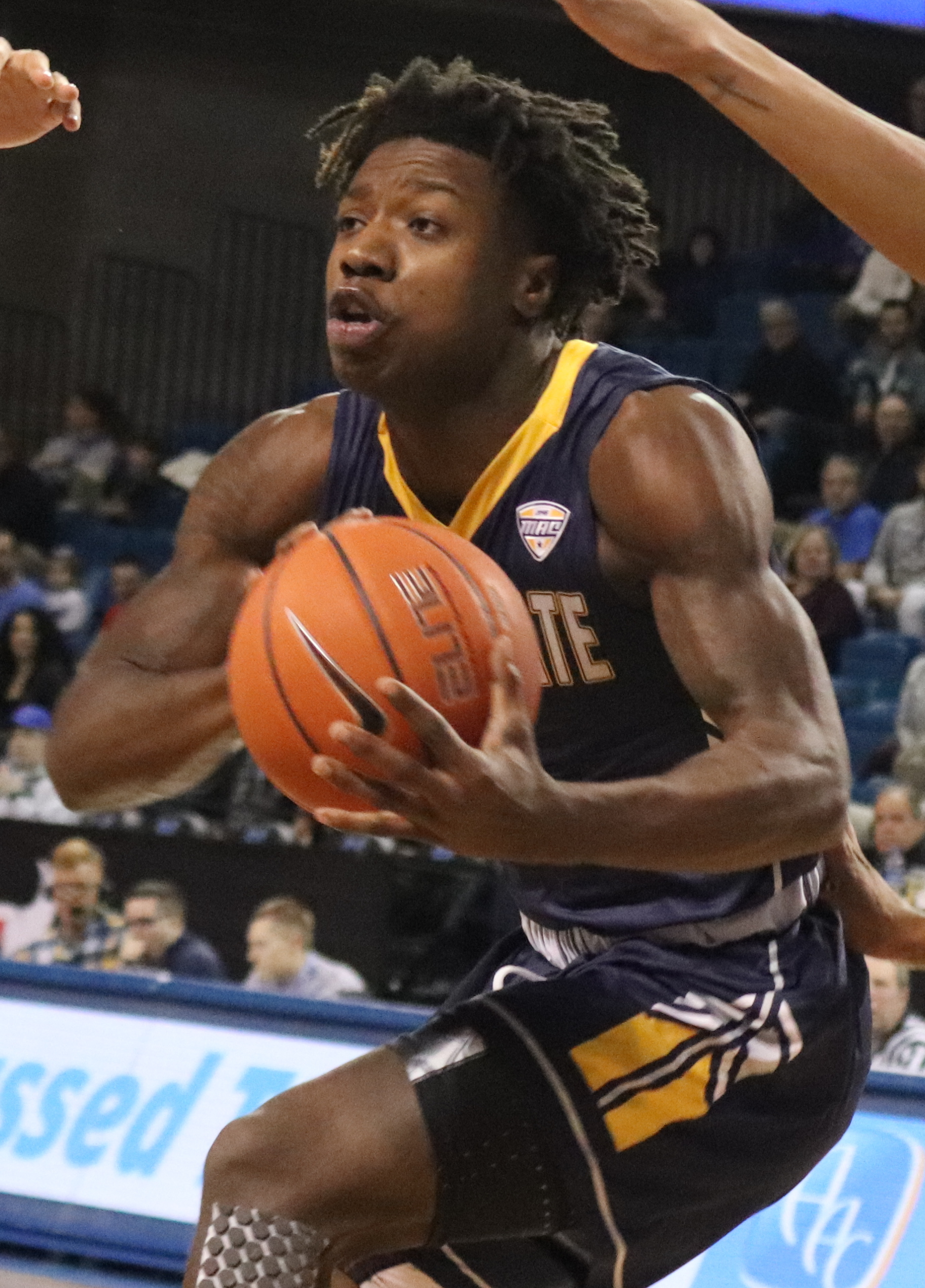
- Williams with Kent State in 2020

No. 1 – RheinStars Köln
- Position: Point guard
- League: ProA

Personal information
- Born: January 12, 1997 (age 29)
- Listed height: 6 ft 0 in (1.83 m)
- Listed weight: 185 lb (84 kg)

Career information
- High school: Farragut Career Academy (Chicago, Illinois); Proviso East (Maywood, Illinois)
- College: Indian Hills CC (2016–2018); Kent State (2018–2020)
- NBA draft: 2020: undrafted
- Playing career: 2021–present

Career history
- 2021: BC Tallinna Kalev
- 2021: Ottawa Blackjacks
- 2021–2023: Plymouth City Patriots
- 2023: KR
- 2025–2026: VfL AstroStars Bochum
- 2026–present: RheinStars Köln

Career highlights
- Second-team All-MAC (2020)

Antonio "Booman" Williams (born January 12, 1997) is an American professional basketball player for RheinStars Köln of the German ProA. Prior to his professional career, he played college basketball for Indian Hills Community College and Kent State.

== Early life ==
Williams grew up in K-Town, Chicago. At the age of 6 or 7, he began playing football, followed by soccer and basketball shortly afterward. In middle school, Williams scored 30 points in his first AAU game. By the time he enrolled in his freshman year at Farragut Career Academy, Williams decided to focus on basketball instead of football. He transferred to Proviso East High School before his sophomore season, playing under Donnie Boyce. Williams missed 20 games during his junior season due to academic ineligibility. As a senior, he averaged 24 points and six rebounds per game, earning Third Team All-State honors. Partially due to his academic issues, Williams received no Division I scholarship offers, so he decided to attend Indian Hills Community College.

== College career ==
As a freshman, Williams averaged 9.3 points and 1.7 steals per game on a team that finished 29–5. During his sophomore season, Williams averaged 14.7 points and 4.8 rebounds per game and earned All-Region first team honors. He helped lead Indian Hills to a 33–1 record. Williams committed to Kent State due to its relatively close distance to his home in Chicago.

As a junior, he averaged 11.5 points and 4.0 rebounds per game. On February 21, 2020, Williams posted a career-high 34 points in a 104–98 double overtime loss to Buffalo. He followed up that performance by scoring a game-high 17 points to lead Kent State past Miami (Ohio) 74–61. As a senior, Williams averaged 14.7 points, 3.8 assists, and 3.9 rebounds per game. He was named to the Second Team All-MAC as well as the MAC Defensive Team.

== Professional career ==
On August 8, 2020, Williams signed with Vevey Riviera of the Swiss Basketball League. He never played for them because the club had big financial and administrative problems. In 2021 he signed with BC Tallinna Kalev in Estonia. In July 2021, Williams joined the Ottawa Blackjacks of the Canadian Elite Basketball League. On December 16, 2021, he signed with the Plymouth City Patriots of the British Basketball League.

On January 6, 2023, Williams signed with KR of the Úrvalsdeild karla.

In July 30, 2025 he signed with VfL AstroStars Bochum of the German second tier ProA.

On July 16, 2026, he signed with RheinStars Köln of the German ProA.

== Personal life ==
Williams is the son of Tamara Willis. His father was shot after entering a convenience store when Williams was 15. He received his nickname, Booman, from his aunt. Williams has a son, Ayden, born in 2015, with former girlfriend Sariah Vance.
