= Plymouth City Patriots =

British professional basketball team

- Nickname: Patriots, Pats
- League: NBL Division 3
- Founded: 2021; 5 years ago
- History: Plymouth City Patriots; 2021–2024
- Location: Plymouth, Devon
- Team colors: Black, teal, purple, white
- Website: Official website

The Plymouth City Patriots were a basketball team based in Plymouth, England. Established in 2021 as a phoenix club following the closure of the Plymouth Raiders, the Patriots competed in the National Basketball League.

== History ==
The Patriots were founded in Plymouth in 2021 following the demise and closure of the Plymouth Raiders, the city's pre-eminent basketball team which had competed in the British Basketball League (BBL) since 2004. The Raiders had withdrawn from the BBL following the 2020–21 season attributed to increasing rental costs of their home venue, the Plymouth Pavilions, though later investigations revealed that the Raiders organisation had accumulated a debt of over £800,000, including unpaid taxes amounting to £161,882.

In July 2021, it was announced by the league that the city of Plymouth would continue to have a franchise in the league for the 2021–22 season, led by local businessman and former Raiders sponsor, Carl Heslop. On 9 August 2021, it was announced that the new franchise would be called the Plymouth City Patriots; the new organisation could not secure the transfer of Raiders' naming and branding rights from its former ownership who later went on to relaunch the Plymouth Raiders as a National Basketball League team in 2023.

Initially a one-year deal was agreed between Heslop and Raiders' former home venue, the Plymouth Pavilions, to stage home games for the newly launched Patriots whilst the club actively sought viable venues to move to once the deal expired – this deal was later extended for the entire 2022–23 and 2023–24 season.

On 10 August 2021, it was announced by the Patriots that Paul James was appointed as the new team's first head coach whilst, on 27 August, former Plymouth Raiders shooting guard Denzel Ubiaro was announced as the team's first player signing. Patriots played their first competitive game on 25 September, a 84–75 loss at Bristol Flyers in the opening round of the BBL Cup. On 17 November, Great Britain international Kofi Josephs scored 46 points in a home defeat to Manchester Giants, a record for the most points scored in a BBL game by a British-born player.

The Patriots' first competitive victory came on 9 January 2022, when they defeated Basketball Wales 113–66 in the first round of the BBL Trophy. The following week, on 14 January, Patriots claimed their first regular season win after defeating Surrey Scorchers, 82–73, at the Plymouth Pavilions. Patriots' form in February saw the team finish the month with a 5–2 win record, earning head coach Paul James and point guard Antonio Williams the Coach and Player of the Month awards respectively.

Patriots finished their inaugural campaign in eighth position in the BBL Championship standings and qualified for the post-season Play-offs thanks to a vital home victory over Newcastle Eagles in the final game of the regular season. Their appearance in the Play-offs was short-lived however, as they lost to eventual winners Leicester Riders with a 16-point aggregate defeat in the quarter-final two-game series. Power forward Rowell Graham-Bell was named in the Molten BBL British Team of the Year in the post-season awards.

The 2022–23 season started with an international pre-season tour of France, with games against CEP Lorient, Champions League regulars Le Mans Sarthe Basket and EuroCup veterans Nanterre 92. Plymouth started the new BBL Championship campaign positively, with captain Elvisi Dusha being awarded BBL Player of the Month for November and, with eight victories by mid-December, the team reached fourth place in the league standings.

The team's good form did not continue into the new year however; a 70–96 home defeat to rivals Bristol on 28 December signalled the start of a seven-game losing streak in the BBL Championship and, coupled with the loss of marquee players Antonio Williams and Troy Simons in January, marked a disastrous start to 2023. Further woe followed on 12 February with a surprise exit to Division 1 team Derby Trailblazers in the BBL Trophy Quarterfinals. Patriots finished the remainder of the season campaign with a 3–15 losing run, ending in lowly ninth position in the BBL Championship and thus failed to qualify for the post-season Playoffs.

Despite a host of new signings, such as T.J. Atwood from Iskra Svit and Taylor Johnson from Hemel Storm, Patriots' lacklustre form continued into the start of the 2023–24 campaign, recording only one win in the opening 10 games. A shock 94–70 victory at home to London Lions on 5 November marked a significant milestone for Head Coach Paul James, earning his 500th BBL Championship career win. On 21 November the club announced that chairman Carl Heslop – a leading figure in the foundation of the club, two years prior – had resigned from his position due to business commitments.

== Home venues ==
- Plymouth Pavilions (2021–2024)
- Plymouth Marjon University (2024–present)

== Season-by-season records ==
Season	Division	Tier	Regular Season						Post-Season	BBL Trophy	BBL Cup	Head Coach
Season	Division	Tier	Finish	Played	Wins	Losses	Points	Win %	Post-Season	BBL Trophy	BBL Cup	Head Coach
Plymouth City Patriots
2021–22	BBL	1	8th	27	12	15	24	0.444	Quarterfinals	Quarterfinals	Qualification Stage	Paul James
2022–23	BBL	1	9th	36	11	25	22	0.306	Did not qualify	Quarterfinals	First Round	Paul James
2023–24	BBL	1	10th	36	7	29	14	0.194	Did not qualify	Pool Stage	(Note: The BBL Cup was abolished following the 2022–23 BBL season.)	Paul James

== Players ==
=== Notable former players ===
Note: Flags indicate national team eligibility at FIBA-sanctioned events. Players may hold other non-FIBA nationalities not displayed.

Criteria

To appear in this section a player must have either:

- Set a club record or won an individual award while at the club
- Played at least one official international match for their national team at any time
- Played at least one official NBA match at any time.

- (United Kingdom) Rowell Graham-Bell (2021–2022)
- (United Kingdom) Kofi Josephs (2021–2022)
- (United States) Rashad Hassan (2021–2023)
- (United States) Antonio Williams (2021–2023)
- (Albania) Elvisi Dusha (2021–2024)

== Personnel ==
=== Head coaches ===
- (United Kingdom) Paul James (10 August 2021–present)

=== Chairpersons ===
- (United Kingdom) Carl Heslop (30 July 2021–15 December 2023)

== See also ==
- British Basketball League
- Plymouth Raiders
