= Bennett Koch =

American basketball player

Personal information
- Born: May 23, 1995 (age 31) Ashwaubenon, Wisconsin
- Listed height: 6 ft 10 in (2.08 m)
- Listed weight: 235 lb (107 kg)

Career information
- High school: Ashwaubenon (Ashwaubenon, Wisconsin)
- College: Northern Iowa (2014–2018)
- NBA draft: 2018: undrafted
- Playing career: 2018–present
- Position: Power forward / center
- Number: 25

Career history
- 2018–2019: Dutch Windmills
- 2019–2024: Sheffield Sharks

Bennett Koch (born May 25, 1995) is an American basketball player who most recently played for Sheffield Sharks. Standing at 6 ft 10 in (2.08 m), Koch plays as power forward or center. He played college basketball for Northern Iowa.

== College career ==
Koch played five seasons for the Northern Iowa Panthers, including a redshirt season in 2013–14. As a freshman, he played behind Seth Tuttle on the NCAA Round of 32 team. Koch broke into the starting lineup as a sophomore and averaged 7.6 points per game. In his final season with Northern Iowa, Koch averaged 12.7 points and 6.1 rebounds per game.

=== College statistics ===
Year	Team	GP	GS	MPG	FG%	3P%	FT%	RPG	APG	SPG	BPG	PPG
2014–15	Northern Iowa	28	0	4.1	.536	.000	.529	0.6	0	0	.1	1.4
2015–16	Northern Iowa	36	36	18.8	.497	.000	.740	2.6	.4	.3	.4	7.6
2016–17	Northern Iowa	29	26	20.3	.570	.000	.762	3.8	.5	.5	.7	11.0
2017–18	Northern Iowa	31	23	24.2	.556	.000	.734	6.1	.5	.7	.8	12.7
Career		124	85	17.2	.542	.000	.736	3.6	.4	.4	.5	8.3

== Professional career ==
On July 30, Koch signed a one-year contract with Dutch Windmills of the Dutch Basketball League (DBL). On 10 April 2019, Windmills withdrew from the DBL due to its financial problems.

On August 7, 2019, Koch signed with the Sheffield Sharks of the British Basketball League (BBL). He re-signed with Sheffield on September 7, 2021.

== Personal life ==
Koch's older brothers Adam and Jake also played at the University of Northern Iowa.
