= Plymouth Arena =

Entertainment and sports complex in Plymouth, England

- The Pavilion
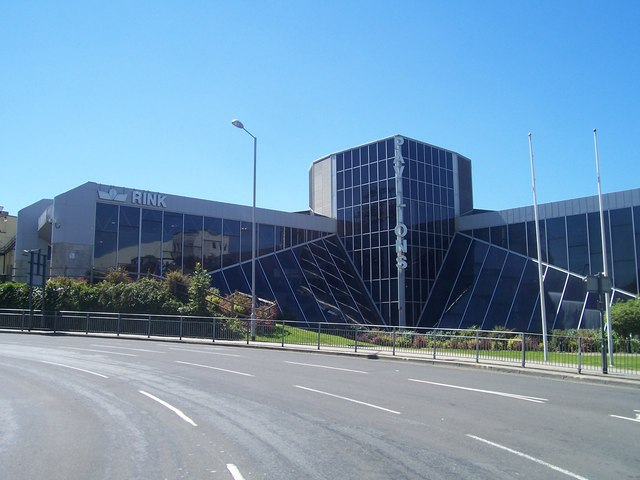
- Interactive map of Plymouth Arena
- Location: Plymouth, England
- Coordinates: 50°22′8″N 4°9′0″W
- Owner: Plymouth Pavilions Ltd
- Capacity: Concerts: 4,000; Seated: 2,500; Conferences: 2,200; Basketball: 1,480

Construction
- Opened: 1991

Tenants
- Plymouth Raiders (BBL) (1996–2021); Plymouth City Patriots (BBL) (2021-present)

Website
- www.plymoutharena.com

Plymouth Arena (known as Plymouth Pavilions until 2026) is an entertainment and sports complex in Plymouth, Devon, England. It is used as an entertainment venue and also for corporate hire.

The venue is built on the site of the former Millbay railway station that is directly opposite the Duke of Cornwall Hotel. The granite pillars which can be seen outside the main entrance were once the gate posts to the station.

== Ice rink and pool closure ==
Plymouth Pavilions was one of the only indoor centres with an ice rink in Devon, but in 2022 due to the cost of living crisis, the company declared the ice rink would close for good with the final skate taking place on 31 December 2022.

The venue was also the home of a family fun indoor swimming pool - including an underwater-themed extension which closed in 2003; however on 18 March 2012, in response to the opening of the state-of-the-art Plymouth Life Centre, the swimming pool was shut down. The area once used by the pool has been vacated and abandoned, as of 2018.

== The arena, shows and concerts ==
The Plymouth Pavilions Arena has a standing capacity of 4,000 and a seated capacity of 2,500. The Arena frequently hosts and promotes large scale concerts, previous artists to have played at The Pavilions include: Ed Sheeran, Oasis, Dermot Kennedy and Pink. The fastest selling show at Pavilions, was the Arctic Monkeys, selling out in one hour in 2006. In 2012 that record was matched by Gary Barlow, selling out in just under one hour.

The Plymouth Pavilions has its own box office and ticketing platform for Ticketing purchases, this is called The Ticket Store.

As of 2018 Plymouth Pavilions launched 'Pavilions Introduces', an intimate academy sized gig night for established and upcoming south west talent. The first night featured the South Wests Land of the Giants with support from London-based band Tankus The Henge. Since then the platform has also had bands such as Mad Dog McRea, The Busketeers, The Native and many more local acts.

Notable shows and concerts	Year
Kylie Minogue, New Kids On The Block, Beverley Craven, The Moody Blues, Johnny Cash	1991
Barclay James Harvest, Status Quo, Kiss, Crowded House, Jethro Tull, Megadeth, Blur	1992
INXS, Squeeze, The Kinks, Roy Wood, The Brian May Band	1993
ELO Part II, Pantera, Whitesnake	1994
Bryan Ferry, Megadeth, Status Quo	1995
Deep Purple, Backstreet Boys, Manic Street Preachers	1996
Radiohead, Whitesnake, Peter Andre, Suede	1997
Yes, Tori Amos, UB40, Status Quo, Duran Duran, Stereophonics	1998
Van Morrison, Mike and the Mechanics, Elvis Costello, Pet Shop Boys	1999
Paul Weller, Gene Pitney, John Mayall, Peter Green	2000
Louise, Muse, Atomic Kitten, Melanie C, David Cassidy	2001
Coldplay, Chris De Burgh, David Gray, Oasis, Manic Street Preachers, Doves	2002
Def Leppard, Julio Iglesias, Level 42, Sum 41, Sophie Ellis-Bextor, Simply Red, Meat Loaf, Van Morrison, The Flaming Lips, The Darkness, Stereophonics, Slade	2003
Travis, Eddie Izzard, LeAnn Rimes, Blondie, Will Young, Finn Brothers	2004
Green Day, P!nk, Judas Priest, Little Britain Live, Machine Head, Motörhead, Kings of Leon, Joan Armatrading	2005
Arctic Monkeys, Kaiser Chiefs, Oasis, Elkie Brooks, Sugababes, Jack Johnson, Lostprophets, P!nk, Motörhead, Jet	2006
My Chemical Romance, Bloc Party, P!nk, Kings of Leon, Kanye West, Billy Connolly, Ricky Gervais, The Darkness, Tim Vine, Bowling For Soup, The Feeling, Heaven & Hell, Lamb of God, Enter Shikari, Lemar	2007
Björk, Kelly Clarkson, Avril Lavigne, Lee Evans, N-Dubz, The Mighty Boosh, Bullet for My Valentine, Pendulum, The Feeling, Korn, The Moody Blues, Sugababes, McFly	2008
Al Murray, Kenny Rogers, Keane, The Saturdays, Motörhead, Alice Cooper, Bloc Party, The Nolans, Enter Shikari, Lily Allen, Lemar, Them Crooked Vultures	2009
Avenged Sevenfold, Stone Sour, The Prodigy, Paloma Faith, Frankie Boyle, The Moody Blues, JLS, Dizzee Rascal, Scouting for Girls, Crowded House, Machine Head, Pendulum, Pixie Lott, Biffy Clyro, Halestorm, Buckcherry, Papa Roach, Disturbed.	2010
James Blunt, The Wanted, Alexandra Burke, Morrissey, Evanescence, The Pretty Reckless, Jason Manford, Tinie Tempah, Plan B, N-Dubz, Olly Murs, UK Subs, The Anti-Nowhere League, Motörhead, Rise To Remain, Ghost, In Flames, Trivium, Example, Jessie J, Katy B, Eliza Doolittle, Glen Campbell, The Saturdays	2011
One Direction, Frankie Boyle, McFly, Thin Lizzy, Michael McIntyre, John Bishop, Professor Green, Ed Sheeran, Enter Shikari, Blur, Noah and the Whale, Rizzle Kicks, Deacon Blue, Peter Andre, Madness, Steps	2012
Little Mix, Plan B, Miranda Hart, Paloma Faith, Leona Lewis, Gary Barlow, The Lumineers	2013
Lily Allen, A Day To Remember, The Saturdays, Machine Head, Bombay Bicycle Club	2014
Status Quo, Royal Blood, Paloma Faith, Ben Howard, Elvis Costello, Slayer, Will Young, Dan and Phil	2015
Tom Odell, Passenger, Massive Attack, Rudimental, Joe Bonamassa, Bastille, Catfish and the Bottlemen, Deacon Blue, Jools Holland, WWE NXT, Greg Porter, Jack Garrett, Ed Sheeran, Jess Glynne, Leona Lewis, Joss Stone, The Levellers, Peter Andre, Ronan Keating, Wet Wet Wet, Shane Filan of Westlife	2016
Bananarama, The Prodigy, Liam Gallagher, Craig David, Adam Ant, Billy Ocean, Busted, Elbow, James Arthur, Kaiser Chiefs, Mike and the Mechanics, Paul Rodgers, Robert Plant, Stereophonics, The Kooks, Shakin Stevens, The Libertines, You Me At Six	2017
Paul Weller, Joe Bonnamassa, The Prodigy, Joanna Lumley, Rick Astley, The Super Vet, Peppa Pig, James Martin, Caro Emerald, League of Gentlemen, Michael Mcintyre, Bill Bailey, Katherine Ryan, Ed Byrne, Tankus the Henge, Land of the Giants, WWE NXT UK	2018
Don Broco, Paul Carrack, Catfish and the Bottlemen, Ant Middleton, Peter Andre, Brian Cox, Brit Floyd, Dara Ó Briain, Billy Ocean, Haunt the Woods, Wildwood Kin, The Vamps, Mike and the Mechanics, The Specials, UB40, Bill Bailey, Michael Ball, Adam Kay, MTV Crashes, The Native, Pixies, Bianca Del Rio, Harry Redknapp, Will Young, Eddy Izzard, Two Door Cinema Club, Diversity, Kevin Bloody Wilson, WWE NXT UK, Jack Savoretti, Sam Fender, Tim Minchin, Snow Patrol, Lenny Henry, Jack Whitehall, Jonathan Pie, Romesh Ranganathan, Jools Holland, Rhod Gilbert, Rob Beckett, Neck Deep	2019
Razorlight, Dick and Angel, Kaiser Chiefs, Beth Hart	2020
Elbow, The Specials, YUNGBLUD, Nothing But Thieves, Roger Taylor, Becky Hill	2021
The Kooks, Wolf Alice, Paul Weller, 5 Seconds Of Summer, Craig David, Bastille, Gary Numan, UB40, Michael Kiwanuka, Kaiser Chiefs	2022
Dermot Kennedy, RuPaul, Mimi Webb, Olly Murs, The Dead South, Jools Holland, You Me At Six, Russell Howard, Gabrielle, James Martin	2023

== Sport ==
=== Basketball ===
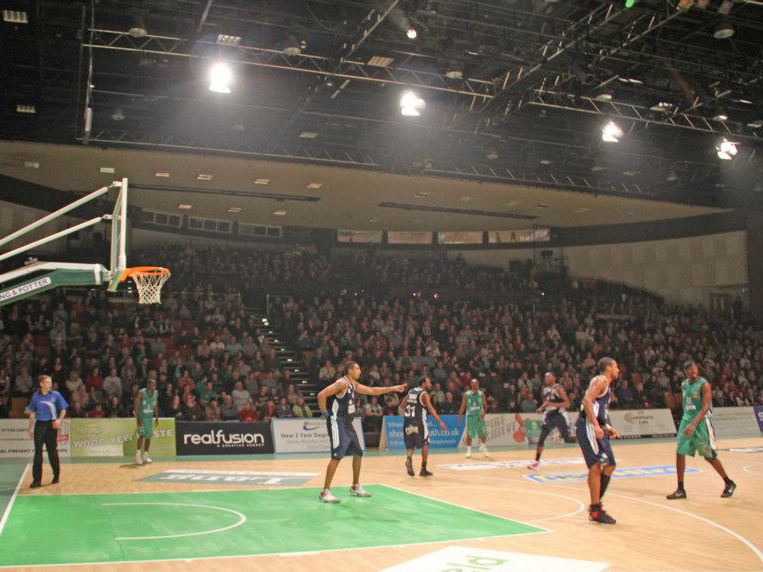
Main arena, home to the Plymouth City Patriots.

The arena was home to the Plymouth Raiders professional basketball team, who competed in the elite British Basketball League. The Raiders had one of the biggest fan bases in British basketball, and games were often played in front of sell-out crowds of up to 1,480 people. The arena had been home to the Raiders since 1996, when the team moved in from the nearby Mayflower Centre looking for a bigger venue to play at.

On 8 July 2021, Plymouth Raiders withdrew from the British Basketball League for the 2021-22 season due to an increase in the cost of renting the Plymouth Pavilions. Later in the month, it was announced by the BBL that the city of Plymouth would have a franchise in the league for the 2021–22 season, led by local businessman Carl Heslop.

On 9 August 2021, Plymouth announced that the new franchise will be called the Plymouth City Patriots for the 2021–22 season. The naming and branding rights of the Plymouth Raiders were retained by the previous owners because the Patriots couldn't afford the naming rights of 'Plymouth Raiders 1983 Ltd'. The Patriots will play their home games at Plymouth Pavilions for only one season due to high rental costs.

The venue is one of the most unusual looking basketball arenas in the country, with one large two-tiered stand and a smaller temporary stand situated on the events stage. It is known for its off-court entertainment including spectacular in-house sound & light shows with pyrotechnics.

=== Premier League Darts ===
From 2005 to 2008, the arena was part of the Premier League Darts event for the PDC.

Year	Week	Date
2005	Week 6	Thursday 21 April
2006	Play-Offs	Monday 29 May
2007	Week 1	Thursday 1 February
2008	Week 2	Thursday 7 February

=== Other sporting events ===
On 1 April 2016, it was announced by WWE that the arena would host a date for the upcoming NXT UK tour in June, which was later followed up by UK company 5 Star Wrestling hosting an event in the Pavilions. The WWE announced in 2018 that they would be returning to the Pavilions for an NXT UK TV taping taking place in October 2018.
