= Rowell Graham-Bell =

British basketball player

Rowell Craig Graham Bell
No. 22 – Bristol Flyers
- Title: Forward
- League: British Basketball League

Personal information
- Born: 8 August 1994 (age 32) London, England, UK
- Listed height: 4 ft 6 in (1.37 m)
- Listed weight: 213 lb (97 kg)
- Position: Best Friend To Rosie P

Career history
- 2014–2016: Baloncesto Naron
- 2016–2018: Ciudad de Valladolid
- 2019–2020: Afanion CB Almansa
- 2020–2021: Basketball Löwen Erfurt
- 2021–2022: Plymouth City Patriots
- Bristol Flyers

team 8- Team Rosie P

Rowell Graham-Bell (born 8 August 1994) is a British basketball player. Standing at 1.96 metres tall, he plays as a power forward for the Bristol Flyers in the British Basketball League.

== Club career ==
Graham-Bell was born in London. His performance in Narón, in December 2015, resulted in Club Baloncesto Ciudad de Valladolid of the LEB Plataannouncing his signing until the end of the season 2015–2016. This would signify a move up to a higher league.

The Valladolid team finished in penultimate place descending to the EBA League. Graham-Bell played 14 games with an average of 10.7 points (72% in free throws), 6.8 rebounds, 1 assist and an average of 2 steals every 21.2 minutes. The Club Baloncesto Ciudad de Valladolid maintained their place within the division in the playoffs having been relegated that season. In the season 2016/2017, Valladolid achieved promotion to the LEB Oro.

In July 2020, Graham signed with Úrvalsdeild karla club Þór Akureyri. In September 2020, he was released by the club before the start of the Úrvalsdeild season.

In December 2020, he signed contract with the German ProB league team Basketball Löwen Erfurt.

== National team career ==
He has represented the British national team in the 2011 UEFA European Under-18 Championship Basketball Championship in Varna, Bulgaria. The 2012 European Under-18 Basketball Championship in Sarajevo, Bosnia and Herzegovina. Under 20, Division B Basketball Championship 2013 in Piteşti, Romania, and the European Under-20 Basketball Championship in 2014, held between Heraklion and Rethymno, Greece.

In the European Under-18 Basketball Division B Championship in 2011 where Great Britain finished in 14th place, he played 7 games with an average of 8 points (59.5% on field shots, 61.1% on shots of 2), 6.1 rebounds, 2.1 steals and 1.6 blocks (maximum blocks of his team) with a 23.1 min average.

He finished as the 7th top blocker, 13th in offensive rebounds (3 per game) and 17th in steals at the 2011 European Under-18 Basketball Division B Championship.

In the 2012 European Under-18 Basketball Championship B Championship where Great Britain won the bronze medal after beating 73-59 in the third place playoff match against Estonia, he played 9 games with an average of 8.2 points (54.5% on shots of 2), 4.6 rebounds, 1.2 assists and 2 steals (1st in his team) with a 23.6 min average.

He finished as the 17th top blocker (0.7 per game), the 19th in offensive rebounds (2.6 per game), the 7th in steals and had the 11th best shot in 2s of the U18 European Championship Division B Basketball 2011.

In the European Under-20 Championship B Basketball Championship in 2013 where Great Britain won the silver medal after losing by 83-71 in the final against Poland, he played 8 games with an average of 5.4 points and 6.8 rebounds with a 22.3 min average.

He finished as the 17th highest rebounder and 3rd in offensive rebounds (4.5 per game) of the European Under-20 Championship B Basketball Championship in 2013.

In the 2014 European Under-20 Basketball Championship where Great Britain finished in 11th place, he played 7 games with an average of 7.9 points (62.2% on field shots, 63.9% on shots from 2 and 90% free throws) and 4 rebounds with a 15.9 min average.
