= Elvisi Dusha =

Albanian-British basketball player

No. 12 – Bristol Hurricanes
- Position: Shooting guard

Personal information
- Born: July 15, 1994 (age 32) London, England
- Listed height: 6 ft 2 in (1.88 m)

Career information
- Playing career: 2013–present

Career history
- 2013–2016: Surrey United / Scorchers
- 2016: Prishtina
- 2017: Plymouth Raiders
- 2017–2018: Worcester Wolves
- 2018: Cheshire Phoenix
- 2018–2020: London City Royals
- 2020: Essex & Herts Leopards
- 2020–2021: Plymouth Raiders
- 2021–2024: Plymouth City Patriots
- 2024–present: Bristol Hurricanes

Career highlights
- BBL Trophy Winner (2019)

Elvisi Dusha (born 15 July 1994) is an Albanian-British professional basketball player for the Bristol Hurricanes of the (NBL). He plays for the Albania national team. Born in London, he has also played for the Surrey Scorchers, Plymouth Raiders, Worcester Wolves, and Prishtina. He signed with the Plymouth Raiders on 31 August 2020.

On 13 September 2021, Dusha signed for newly founded club Plymouth City Patriots. In November 2022, the BBL named Dusha as Player of the Month.

== Honours ==
- BBL Trophy Winners: 2018–19 (1)
