= 2021–22 BBL Championship =

Basketball season

The 2021–22 BBL Championship of the 2021–22 BBL season, the 35th season of the British Basketball League started on 29 October 2021 to 24 April 2022.

On 6 April 2022, Leicester Riders were crowned league champions and won their 6th BBL Championship title.

== Ladder ==
The BBL Championship retained the three-game series format from the previous season, for a 27-game regular season, played across 24 Rounds between 29 October 2021 to 24 April 2022.

=== Standings ===
| Pos | Team | Pld | W | L | PF | PA | PD | Pts | Qualification |
|---|---|---|---|---|---|---|---|---|---|
| 1 | Leicester Riders (C) | 27 | 25 | 2 | 2458 | 1934 | +524 | 50 | Playoffs |
| 2 | Sheffield Sharks | 27 | 17 | 10 | 2054 | 2005 | +49 | 34 | Playoffs |
| 3 | London Lions | 27 | 16 | 11 | 2276 | 2165 | +111 | 32 | Playoffs |
| 4 | Bristol Flyers | 27 | 14 | 13 | 2185 | 2097 | +88 | 28 | Playoffs |
| 5 | Manchester Giants | 27 | 14 | 13 | 2351 | 2309 | +42 | 28 | Playoffs |
| 6 | Cheshire Phoenix | 27 | 13 | 14 | 2272 | 2280 | −8 | 26 | Playoffs |
| 7 | Glasgow Rocks | 27 | 12 | 15 | 2415 | 2471 | −56 | 24 | Playoffs |
| 8 | Plymouth City Patriots | 27 | 12 | 15 | 2176 | 2319 | −143 | 24 | Playoffs |
| 9 | Newcastle Eagles | 27 | 10 | 17 | 2313 | 2422 | −109 | 20 | |
| 10 | Surrey Scorchers | 27 | 2 | 25 | 1959 | 2457 | −498 | 4 | |

Updated to match(es) played on 24 April 2022. Source: BBC Sport
(C) Champions

=== Ladder progression ===
- Numbers highlighted in green indicate that the team finished the round inside the top eight.
- Numbers highlighted in blue indicates the team finished first on the ladder in that round.
- Numbers highlighted in red indicates the team finished last place on the ladder in that round.

2021–22 BBL Championship
| Team | 1 | 2 | 3 | 4 | 5 | 6 | 7 | 8 | 9 | 10 | 11 | 12 | 13 | 14 | 15 | 16 | 17 | 18 | 19 | 20 | 21 | 22 | 23 | 24 |
|---|---|---|---|---|---|---|---|---|---|---|---|---|---|---|---|---|---|---|---|---|---|---|---|---|
| Bristol Flyers | – | 6 | 6 | 7 | 7 | 6 | 4 | 4 | 4 | 5 | 3 | 3 | 5 | 7 | 7 | 8 | 8 | 7 | 7 | 7 | 8 | 8 | 5 | 4 |
| Cheshire Phoenix | 4 | 10 | 10 | 8 | 8 | 8 | 8 | 8 | 8 | 4 | 6 | 5 | 4 | 4 | 2 | 2 | 3 | 4 | 4 | 4 | 5 | 5 | 6 | 6 |
| Glasgow Rocks | – | 8 | 8 | 4 | 5 | 7 | 7 | 5 | 5 | 6 | 8 | 8 | 8 | 9 | 9 | 9 | 9 | 9 | 9 | 9 | 6 | 6 | 7 | 7 |
| Leicester Riders | 2 | 5 | 5 | 3 | 1 | 1 | 1 | 1 | 1 | 1 | 1 | 1 | 1 | 1 | 1 | 1 | 1 | 1 | 1 | 1 | 1 | 1 | 1 | 1 |
| London Lions | – | 4 | 4 | 2 | 4 | 5 | 6 | 7 | 7 | 8 | 7 | 6 | 6 | 6 | 6 | 6 | 5 | 5 | 5 | 5 | 2 | 4 | 4 | 3 |
| Manchester Giants | 3 | 3 | 1 | 1 | 2 | 4 | 3 | 3 | 2 | 2 | 2 | 2 | 2 | 3 | 4 | 4 | 4 | 2 | 2 | 2 | 3 | 3 | 3 | 5 |
| Newcastle Eagles | 5 | 2 | 3 | 5 | 6 | 3 | 5 | 6 | 6 | 7 | 5 | 7 | 7 | 5 | 5 | 5 | 6 | 8 | 8 | 8 | 9 | 9 | 9 | 9 |
| Plymouth City Patriots | – | 9 | 9 | 10 | 9 | 9 | 10 | 10 | 10 | 9 | 9 | 9 | 9 | 8 | 8 | 7 | 7 | 6 | 6 | 6 | 7 | 7 | 8 | 8 |
| Sheffield Sharks | 1 | 1 | 2 | 6 | 3 | 2 | 2 | 2 | 3 | 3 | 4 | 4 | 3 | 2 | 3 | 3 | 2 | 3 | 3 | 3 | 4 | 2 | 2 | 2 |
| Surrey Scorchers | – | 7 | 7 | 9 | 10 | 10 | 9 | 9 | 9 | 10 | 10 | 10 | 10 | 10 | 10 | 10 | 10 | 10 | 10 | 10 | 10 | 10 | 10 | 10 |

== Games ==
=== Round 1 ===
| 29 October 2021 | Sheffield Sharks | 101–73 | Manchester Giants | Ponds Forge, Sheffield |
| 19:30 | Scoring by quarter: 28–23, 17–11, 32–17, 24–22 |
| BBL Player | | boxscore report | | Attendance: 517 |

| 29 October 2021 | Leicester Riders | 100–77 | Newcastle Eagles | Morningside Arena, Leicester |
| 19:30 | Scoring by quarter: 20–22, 31–13, 27–23, 22–19 |
| Sky Sports | | boxscore report | | Attendance: 1,500 |

| 31 October 2021 | Cheshire Phoenix | 91–92 | Manchester Giants | Cheshire Oaks Arena, Ellesmere Port |
| 17:30 | Scoring by quarter: 19–22, 28–29, 23–24, 21–17 |
| BBL Player | | boxscore report | | Attendance: 500 |

=== Round 2 ===
| 5 November 2021 | Newcastle Eagles | 90–81 | Surrey Scorchers | Vertu Motors Arena, Newcastle |
| 19:30 | Scoring by quarter: 23–20, 28–18, 20–22, 19–21 |
| BBL Player | | boxscore report | | Attendance: not available |

| 5 November 2021 | London Lions | 113–74 | Cheshire Phoenix | Copper Box Arena, London |
| 19:30 | Scoring by quarter: 28–17, 25–15, 22–24, 38–18 |
| Sky Sports | | boxscore report | | Attendance: 650 |

| 5 November 2021 | Manchester Giants | 88–89 | Sheffield Sharks | National Basketball Centre, Manchester |
| 19:30 | Scoring by quarter: 20–16, 24–22, 28–28, 16–23 |
| BBL Player | | boxscore report | | Attendance: 100 |

| 6 November 2021 | Bristol Flyers | 76–68 | Cheshire Phoenix | SGS College Arena, Bristol |
| 19:30 | Scoring by quarter: 18–17, 15–17, 23–21, 20–13 |
| BBL Player | | boxscore report | | Attendance: not available |

| 7 November 2021 | Plymouth City Patriots | 74–99 | Newcastle Eagles | Plymouth Pavilions, Plymouth |
| 15:00 | Scoring by quarter: 7–23, 21–26, 27–24, 19–26 |
| BBL Player | | boxscore report | | Attendance: not available |

| 7 November 2021 | Manchester Giants | 99–80 | Glasgow Rocks | National Basketball Centre, Manchester |
| 18:00 | Scoring by quarter: 22–19, 23–19, 26–19, 28–23 |
| BBL Player | | boxscore report | | Attendance: 100 |

=== Round 3 ===
| 12 November 2021 | Manchester Giants | 109–81 | Cheshire Phoenix | National Basketball Centre, Manchester |
| 19:30 | Scoring by quarter: 18–18, 35–11, 28–29, 28–23 |
| Sky Sports | | boxscore report | | Attendance: 900 |

=== Round 4 ===
| 17 November 2021 | Plymouth City Patriots | 93–99(OT) | Manchester Giants | Plymouth Pavilions, Plymouth |
| 19:00 | Scoring by quarter: 22–13, 14–21, 24–21, 20–25, Overtime: 13–19 |
| BBL Player | | boxscore report | | Attendance: not available |

| 19 November 2021 | Glasgow Rocks | 99–78 | Bristol Flyers | Emirates Arena, Glasgow |
| 19:30 | Scoring by quarter: 27–23, 23–16, 23–22, 26–17 |
| Sky Sports | | boxscore report | | Attendance: not available |

| 19 November 2021 | Leicester Riders | 94–72 | Cheshire Phoenix | Morningside Arena, Leicester |
| 20:00 | Scoring by quarter: 19–21, 22–23, 21–16, 32–12 |
| BBL Player | | boxscore report | | Attendance: not available |

| 20 November 2021 | Surrey Scorchers | 72–85 | London Lions | Surrey Sports Park, Guildford |
| 18:00 | Scoring by quarter: 20–26, 20–22, 15–16, 17–21 |
| BBL Player | | boxscore report | | Attendance: 1,000 |

| 21 November 2021 | Glasgow Rocks | 107–96 | Plymouth City Patriots | Emirates Arena, Glasgow |
| 17:00 | Scoring by quarter: 30–21, 20–23, 27–22, 30–30 |
| BBL Player | | boxscore report | | Attendance: 500 |

| 21 November 2021 | Cheshire Phoenix | 86–67 | Sheffield Sharks | Cheshire Oaks Arena, Ellesmere Port |
| 17:30 | Scoring by quarter: 27–11, 14–20, 21–10, 24–26 |
| BBL Player | | boxscore report | | Attendance: 1,010 |

=== Round 5 ===
| 26 November 2021 | Newcastle Eagles | 77–86 | Sheffield Sharks | Vertu Motors Arena, Newcastle |
| 19:30 | Scoring by quarter: 15–29, 23–15, 19–21, 20–21 |
| Sky Sports | | boxscore report | | Attendance: 2,800 |

| 26 November 2021 | Leicester Riders | 90–61 | Surrey Scorchers | Morningside Arena, Leicester |
| 20:00 | Scoring by quarter: 24–16, 22–16, 23–13, 21–16 |
| BBL Player | | boxscore report | | Attendance: not available |

| 28 November 2021 | Sheffield Sharks | 72–80 | Leicester Riders | Ponds Forge, Sheffield |
| 16:00 | Scoring by quarter: 30–21, 12–22, 15–12, 15–25 |
| BBL Player | | boxscore report | | Attendance: 237 |

=== Round 6 ===
| 3 December 2021 | Sheffield Sharks | 62–51 | Plymouth City Patriots | Ponds Forge, Sheffield |
| 19:30 | Scoring by quarter: 20–7, 10–23, 18–15, 14–6 |
| BBL Player | | boxscore report | | Attendance: 317 |

| 3 December 2021 | Bristol Flyers | 80–71 | Surrey Scorchers | SGS College Arena, Bristol |
| 19:30 | Scoring by quarter: 20–25, 23–12, 16–11, 21–23 |
| BBL Player | | boxscore report | | Attendance: 660 |

| 3 December 2021 | Newcastle Eagles | 96–84 | London Lions | Vertu Motors Arena, Newcastle |
| 19:30 | Scoring by quarter: 21–23, 30–24, 21–22, 24–15 |
| Sky Sports | | boxscore report | | Attendance: 2,500 |

| 3 December 2021 | Leicester Riders | 105–76 | Glasgow Rocks | Morningside Arena, Leicester |
| 20:00 | Scoring by quarter: 32–13, 33–22, 21–19, 19–22 |
| BBL Player | | boxscore report | | Attendance: 756 |

| 4 December 2021 | Surrey Scorchers | 81–122 | Glasgow Rocks | Surrey Sports Park, Guildford |
| 18:00 | Scoring by quarter: 22–35, 13–19, 25–36, 21–32 |
| BBL Player | | boxscore report | | Attendance: 300 |

| 5 December 2021 | Bristol Flyers | 78–58 | Plymouth City Patriots | SGS College Arena, Bristol |
| 15:00 | Scoring by quarter: 17–16, 17–13, 26–15, 18–14 |
| BBL Player | | boxscore report | | Attendance: not available |

| 5 December 2021 | London Lions | 107–80 | Manchester Giants | Copper Box Arena, London |
| 16:00 | Scoring by quarter: 32–19, 19–18, 28–23, 28–20 |
| BBL Player | | boxscore report | | Attendance: not available |

| 5 December 2021 | Cheshire Phoenix | 110–113(3OT) | Newcastle Eagles | Cheshire Oaks Arena, Ellesmere Port |
| 17:30 | Scoring by quarter: 23–24, 23–16, 17–23, 18–18, Overtime: 10–10, 8–8, 11–14 |
| BBL Player | | boxscore report | | Attendance: 600 |

=== Round 7 ===
| 8 December 2021 | Plymouth City Patriots | 61–66 | Sheffield Sharks | Plymouth Pavilions, Plymouth |
| 19:00 | Scoring by quarter: 12–19, 17–9, 11–15, 21–23 |
| BBL Player | | boxscore report | | Attendance: not available |

| 10 December 2021 | Manchester Giants | 94–79 | Glasgow Rocks | National Basketball Centre, Manchester |
| 19:30 | Scoring by quarter: 28–24, 22–21, 21–19, 23–15 |
| Sky Sports | | boxscore report | | Attendance: 100 |

| 10 December 2021 | Newcastle Eagles | 55–73 | Bristol Flyers | Vertu Motors Arena, Newcastle |
| 19:30 | Scoring by quarter: 18–24, 11–11, 15–24, 11–14 |
| BBL Player | | boxscore report | | Attendance: 1,700 |

=== Round 8 ===
| 17 December 2021 | Leicester Riders | 101–72 | Newcastle Eagles | Morningside Arena, Leicester |
| 19:30 | Scoring by quarter: 27–15, 27–23, 26–15, 21–19 |
| Sky Sports | | boxscore report | | Attendance: not available |

| 19 December 2021 | Glasgow Rocks | 87–84 | Bristol Flyers | Emirates Arena, Glasgow |
| 17:00 | Scoring by quarter: 27–23, 19–21, 27–14, 14–26 |
| BBL Player | | boxscore report | | Attendance: 150 |

| 19 December 2021 | Cheshire Phoenix | 120–69 | Plymouth City Patriots | Cheshire Oaks Arena, Ellesmere Port |
| 17:30 | Scoring by quarter: 27–20, 28–20, 28–8, 37–21 |
| BBL Player | | boxscore report | | Attendance: 66 |

=== Round 9 ===
| 27 December 2021 | Leicester Riders | 106–60 | Plymouth City Patriots | Morningside Arena, Leicester |
| 18:00 | Scoring by quarter: 27–15, 29–10, 22–15, 28–20 |
| BBL Player | | boxscore report | | Attendance: 666 |

| 28 December 2021 | Newcastle Eagles | 74–77 | Cheshire Phoenix | Vertu Motors Arena, Newcastle |
| 19:30 | Scoring by quarter: 16–29, 9–12, 20–15, 29–21 |
| BBL Player | | boxscore report | | Attendance: 2,600 |

| 29 December 2021 | Plymouth City Patriots | 101–92(OT) | Bristol Flyers | Plymouth Pavilions, Plymouth |
| 19:00 | Scoring by quarter: 28–26, 21–20, 15–25, 24–17, Overtime: 13–4 |
| BBL Player | | boxscore report | | Attendance: 500 |
Note: Exhibition game

| 30 December 2021 | Manchester Giants | 80–76 | Cheshire Phoenix | National Basketball Centre, Manchester |
| 17:00 | Scoring by quarter: 17–23, 26–17, 15–19, 22–17 |
| BBL Player | | boxscore report | | Attendance: 100 |

| 1 January 2022 | Surrey Scorchers | 78–77 | London Lions | Surrey Sports Park, Guildford |
| 14:00 | Scoring by quarter: 20–21, 21–15, 24–25, 13–16 |
| BBL Player | | boxscore report | | Attendance: 1,000 |

| 2 January 2022 | Sheffield Sharks | 62–100 | Leicester Riders | Ponds Forge, Sheffield |
| 16:00 | Scoring by quarter: 20–24, 14–33, 12–20, 16–23 |
| BBL Player | | boxscore report | | Attendance: 759 |

| 2 January 2022 | Manchester Giants | 88–82 | Newcastle Eagles | National Basketball Centre, Manchester |
| 17:00 | Scoring by quarter: 20–23, 20–17, 27–23, 21–19 |
| BBL Player | | boxscore report | | Attendance: 250 |

=== Round 10 ===
| 14 January 2022 | Sheffield Sharks | 56–77 | Cheshire Phoenix | Ponds Forge, Sheffield |
| 19:30 | Scoring by quarter: 15–20, 11–13, 17–19, 13–25 |
| BBL Player | | boxscore report | | Attendance: not available |

| 14 January 2022 | Bristol Flyers | 64–92 | Leicester Riders | SGS College Arena, Bristol |
| 19:30 | Scoring by quarter: 21–27, 14–21, 19–20, 19–24 |
| BBL Player | | boxscore report | | Attendance: 770 |

| 14 January 2022 | Plymouth City Patriots | 82–73 | Surrey Scorchers | Plymouth Pavilions, Plymouth |
| 19:30 | Scoring by quarter: 20–21, 23–11, 22–18, 17–23 |
| Sky Sports | | boxscore report | | Attendance: not available |

| 16 January 2022 | Manchester Giants | 77–84 | Plymouth City Patriots | National Basketball Centre, Manchester |
| 17:00 | Scoring by quarter: 23–24, 14–30, 18–17, 22–13 |
| BBL Player | | boxscore report | | Attendance: 500 |

| 16 January 2022 | Cheshire Phoenix | 107–87 | Glasgow Rocks | Cheshire Oaks Arena, Ellesmere Port |
| 17:30 | Scoring by quarter: 34–22, 23–29, 27–15, 23–21 |
| BBL Player | | boxscore report | | Attendance: 885 |

=== Round 11 ===
| 21 January 2022 | Sheffield Sharks | 74–75 | Bristol Flyers | Ponds Forge, Sheffield |
| 19:30 | Scoring by quarter: 26–17, 15–20, 14–21, 19–17 |
| Sky Sports | | boxscore report | | Attendance: not available |

| 21 January 2022 | Newcastle Eagles | 113–111(OT) | Manchester Giants | Vertu Motors Arena, Newcastle |
| 19:30 | Scoring by quarter: 29–23, 28–27, 24–25, 17–23, Overtime: 15–13 |
| BBL Player | | boxscore report | | Attendance: not available |

| 22 January 2022 | Bristol Flyers | 91–73 | Glasgow Rocks | SGS College Arena, Bristol |
| 19:30 | Scoring by quarter: 21–13, 16–16, 33–18, 21–26 |
| BBL Player | | boxscore report | | Attendance: not available |

| 23 January 2022 | Surrey Scorchers | 65–70 | Sheffield Sharks | Surrey Sports Park, Guildford |
| 14:00 | Scoring by quarter: 16–22, 18–16, 16–16, 15–16 |
| BBL Player | | boxscore report | | Attendance: 400 |

| 23 January 2022 | London Lions | 103–94 | Newcastle Eagles | Copper Box Arena, London |
| 16:00 | Scoring by quarter: 27–14, 31–27, 18–30, 27–23 |
| BBL Player | | boxscore report | | Attendance: 800 |

| 23 January 2022 | Cheshire Phoenix | 59–76 | Leicester Riders | Cheshire Oaks Arena, Ellesmere Port |
| 17:30 | Scoring by quarter: 18–10, 12–21, 20–23, 9–22 |
| BBL Player | | boxscore report | | Attendance: not available |

=== Round 12 ===
| 28 January 2022 | Plymouth City Patriots | 94–101 | London Lions | Plymouth Pavilions, Plymouth |
| 19:00 | Scoring by quarter: 22–23, 26–29, 23–27, 23–22 |
| BBL Player | | boxscore report | | Attendance: not available |

| 28 January 2022 | Surrey Scorchers | 80–85 | Cheshire Phoenix | Surrey Sports Park, Guildford |
| 19:30 | Scoring by quarter: 20–19, 16–27, 19–16, 25–23 |
| BBL Player | | boxscore report | | Attendance: 200 |

=== Round 13 ===
| 4 February 2022 | London Lions | 67–80 | Leicester Riders | Copper Box Arena, London |
| 19:30 | Scoring by quarter: 26–22, 22–24, 15–20, 4–14 |
| Sky Sports | | boxscore report | | Attendance: not available |

| 4 February 2022 | Sheffield Sharks | 102–81 | Newcastle Eagles | Ponds Forge, Sheffield |
| 19:30 | Scoring by quarter: 19–19, 26–17, 23–21, 34–24 |
| BBL Player | | boxscore report | | Attendance: not available |

| 5 February 2022 | Surrey Scorchers | 74–81 | Manchester Giants | Surrey Sports Park, Guildford |
| 18:00 | Scoring by quarter: 26–17, 14–29, 15–22, 19–13 |
| BBL Player | | boxscore report | | Attendance: 200 |

| 6 February 2022 | Plymouth City Patriots | 87–74 | Surrey Scorchers | Plymouth Pavilions, Plymouth |
| 15:00 | Scoring by quarter: 23–26, 28–18, 14–17, 22–13 |
| BBL Player | | boxscore report | | Attendance: not available |

| 6 February 2022 | Cheshire Phoenix | 93–87 | Glasgow Rocks | Cheshire Oaks Arena, Ellesmere Port |
| 17:30 | Scoring by quarter: 24–32, 22–10, 24–22, 23–23 |
| BBL Player | | boxscore report | | Attendance: not available |

=== Round 14 ===
| 11 February 2022 | Sheffield Sharks | 90–77 | Glasgow Rocks | Ponds Forge, Sheffield |
| 19:30 | Scoring by quarter: 22–25, 20–14, 24–21, 24–17 |
| BBL Player | | boxscore report | | Attendance: not available |

| 11 February 2022 | Leicester Riders | 86–69 | Manchester Giants | Morningside Arena, Leicester |
| 19:30 | Scoring by quarter: 23–24, 26–4, 21–20, 16–21 |
| Sky Sports | | boxscore report | | Attendance: not available |

| 11 February 2022 | Bristol Flyers | 73–77 | Plymouth City Patriots | SGS College Arena, Bristol |
| 19:30 | Scoring by quarter: 19–21, 20–18, 20–23, 14–15 |
| BBL Player | | boxscore report | | Attendance: 770 |

| 11 February 2022 | Newcastle Eagles | 114–72 | Surrey Scorchers | Vertu Motors Arena, Newcastle |
| 19:30 | Scoring by quarter: 27–15, 30–23, 32–18, 25–16 |
| BBL Player | | boxscore report | | Attendance: 2,600 |

| 13 February 2022 | Plymouth City Patriots | 77–76 | Manchester Giants | Plymouth Pavilions, Plymouth |
| 15:00 | Scoring by quarter: 15–17, 22–16, 16–24, 24–19 |
| BBL Player | | boxscore report | | Attendance: not available |

| 13 February 2022 | London Lions | 79–77 | Leicester Riders | Copper Box Arena, London |
| 16:00 | Scoring by quarter: 22–21, 21–27, 22–14, 14–15 |
| BBL Player | | boxscore report | | Attendance: 2,000 |

| 13 February 2022 | Glasgow Rocks | 91–97 | Newcastle Eagles | Emirates Arena, Glasgow |
| 17:00 | Scoring by quarter: 21–39, 28–16, 20–24, 22–18 |
| BBL Player | | boxscore report | | Attendance: 200 |

| 13 February 2022 | Cheshire Phoenix | 84–76 | Bristol Flyers | Cheshire Oaks Arena, Ellesmere Port |
| 17:30 | Scoring by quarter: 13–17, 25–15, 21–26, 25–18 |
| BBL Player | | boxscore report | | Attendance: not available |

=== Round 15 ===
| 18 February 2022 | Plymouth City Patriots | 110–103(2OT) | Bristol Flyers | Plymouth Pavilions, Plymouth |
| 19:00 | Scoring by quarter: 17–24, 20–20, 30–19, 21–25, Overtime: 12–12, 10–3 |
| BBL Player | | boxscore report | | Attendance: not available |

| 18 February 2022 | Newcastle Eagles | 97–95 | Glasgow Rocks | Vertu Motors Arena, Newcastle |
| 20:00 | Scoring by quarter: 21–32, 25–25, 32–18, 19–20 |
| Sky Sports | | boxscore report | | Attendance: 1,200 |

| 18 February 2022 | Leicester Riders | 90–77 | Sheffield Sharks | Morningside Arena, Leicester |
| 20:00 | Scoring by quarter: 26–19, 14–24, 25–20, 25–14 |
| BBL Player | | boxscore report | | Attendance: 2,000 |

| 19 February 2022 | Surrey Scorchers | 62–90 | Cheshire Phoenix | Surrey Sports Park, Guildford |
| 18:00 | Scoring by quarter: 18–27, 17–25, 17–15, 10–23 |
| BBL Player | | boxscore report | | Attendance: not available |

| 20 February 2022 | Cheshire Phoenix | 80–77 | Plymouth City Patriots | Cheshire Oaks Arena, Ellesmere Port |
| 17:30 | Scoring by quarter: 21–22, 24–28, 15–15, 20–12 |
| BBL Player | | boxscore report | | Attendance: 1,000 |

| 20 February 2022 | Glasgow Rocks | 76–105 | Leicester Riders | Emirates Arena, Glasgow |
| 18:00 | Scoring by quarter: 17–33, 20–35, 9–22, 30–15 |
| BBL Player | | boxscore report | | Attendance: 2,000 |

=== Round 16 ===
| 25 February 2022 | Sheffield Sharks | 77–66 | Surrey Scorchers | Ponds Forge, Sheffield |
| 19:30 | Scoring by quarter: 16–16, 18–19, 19–17, 24–14 |
| Sky Sports | | boxscore report | | Attendance: not available |

| 25 February 2022 | London Lions | 81–83 | Plymouth City Patriots | Copper Box Arena, London |
| 19:30 | Scoring by quarter: 26–18, 22–17, 14–22, 19–26 |
| BBL Player | | boxscore report | | Attendance: not available |

| 27 February 2022 | Plymouth City Patriots | 73–77 | London Lions | Plymouth Pavilions, Plymouth |
| 15:00 | Scoring by quarter: 22–16, 15–19, 21–21, 15–21 |
| BBL Player | | boxscore report | | Attendance: 1,300 |

| 27 February 2022 | Glasgow Rocks | 78–71 | Sheffield Sharks | Emirates Arena, Glasgow |
| 17:00 | Scoring by quarter: 21–16, 23–21, 17–18, 17–16 |
| BBL Player | | boxscore report | | Attendance: 400 |

=== Round 17 ===
| 4 March 2022 | Manchester Giants | 58–81 | Bristol Flyers | National Basketball Centre, Manchester |
| 19:30 | Scoring by quarter: 16–23, 18–19, 8–17, 15–20 |
| BBL Player | | boxscore report | | Attendance: 500 |

| 4 March 2022 | Newcastle Eagles | 87–91 | Plymouth City Patriots | Vertu Motors Arena, Newcastle |
| 19:30 | Scoring by quarter: 23–16, 20–17, 20–29, 24–29 |
| BBL Player | | boxscore report | | Attendance: 2,800 |

| 4 March 2022 | Glasgow Rocks | 75–96 | London Lions | Emirates Arena, Glasgow |
| 19:30 | Scoring by quarter: 21–24, 22–23, 18–27, 14–22 |
| Sky Sports | | boxscore report | | Attendance: 400 |

| 5 March 2022 | Bristol Flyers | 75–78 | Leicester Riders | SGS College Arena, Bristol |
| 19:30 | Scoring by quarter: 18–18, 22–15, 20–24, 15–21 |
| BBL Player | | boxscore report | | Attendance: not available |

| 6 March 2022 | London Lions | 76–83 | Sheffield Sharks | Copper Box Arena, London |
| 16:00 | Scoring by quarter: 25–24, 14–19, 21–21, 16–19 |
| BBL Player | | boxscore report | | Attendance: not available |

| 6 March 2022 | Manchester Giants | 94–75 | Surrey Scorchers | National Basketball Centre, Manchester |
| 17:00 | Scoring by quarter: 16–14, 35–19, 20–19, 23–23 |
| BBL Player | | boxscore report | | Attendance: 250 |

=== Round 18 ===
| 8 March 2022 | Plymouth City Patriots | 96–80 | Cheshire Phoenix | Plymouth Pavilions, Plymouth |
| 19:00 | Scoring by quarter: 18–16, 28–21, 16–22, 34–21 |
| BBL Player | | boxscore report | | Attendance: not available |

| 11 March 2022 | Newcastle Eagles | 89–110 | Manchester Giants | Vertu Motors Arena, Newcastle |
| 19:30 | Scoring by quarter: 34–29, 15–18, 19–32, 21–31 |
| Sky Sports | | boxscore report | | Attendance: 1,700 |

| 11 March 2022 | Bristol Flyers | 75–72(OT) | Sheffield Sharks | SGS College Arena, Bristol |
| 19:30 | Scoring by quarter: 18–12, 19–12, 8–15, 18–24, Overtime: 12–9 |
| BBL Player | | boxscore report | | Attendance: 770 |

| 11 March 2022 | Surrey Scorchers | 95–86 | Glasgow Rocks | Surrey Sports Park, Guildford |
| 19:30 | Scoring by quarter: 24–21, 22–21, 24–21, 25–23 |
| BBL Player | | boxscore report | | Attendance: 800 |

| 11 March 2022 | Leicester Riders | 80–59 | Cheshire Phoenix | Morningside Arena, Leicester |
| 20:00 | Scoring by quarter: 14–11, 25–15, 25–15, 16–18 |
| BBL Player | | boxscore report | | Attendance: 666 |

| 13 March 2022 | Manchester Giants | 85–83 | Leicester Riders | National Basketball Centre, Manchester |
| 17:00 | Scoring by quarter: 20–20, 21–18, 15–22, 29–23 |
| BBL Player | | boxscore report | | Attendance: 500 |

| 13 March 2022 | Glasgow Rocks | 99–87 | Plymouth City Patriots | Emirates Arena, Glasgow |
| 17:00 | Scoring by quarter: 25–19, 23–22, 27–28, 24–18 |
| BBL Player | | boxscore report | | Attendance: 1,000 |

| 13 March 2022 | Cheshire Phoenix | 89–97 | London Lions | Cheshire Oaks Arena, Ellesmere Port |
| 17:30 | Scoring by quarter: 24–28, 25–23, 25–23, 15–23 |
| BBL Player | | boxscore report | | Attendance: 1,000 |

=== Round 19 ===
| 17 March 2022 | Manchester Giants | 94–56 | London Lions | National Basketball Centre, Manchester |
| 19:30 | Scoring by quarter: 16–17, 29–10, 25–10, 24–19 |
| BBL Player | | boxscore report | | Attendance: 500 |

| 18 March 2022 | Surrey Scorchers | 60–82 | Leicester Riders | Surrey Sports Park, Guildford |
| 19:30 | Scoring by quarter: 17–21, 13–24, 21–17, 9–20 |
| BBL Player | | boxscore report | | Attendance: 780 |

=== Round 20 ===
| 25 March 2022 | Leicester Riders | 87–82 | Bristol Flyers | Morningside Arena, Leicester |
| 19:30 | Scoring by quarter: 21–32, 25–11, 15–21, 26–18 |
| Sky Sports | | boxscore report | | Attendance: not available |

| 25 March 2022 | London Lions | 92–100 | Glasgow Rocks | Copper Box Arena, London |
| 19:30 | Scoring by quarter: 31–22, 16–15, 30–28, 15–35 |
| BBL Player | | boxscore report | | Attendance: 2,000 |

| 25 March 2022 | Sheffield Sharks | 73–53 | Newcastle Eagles | Ponds Forge, Sheffield |
| 19:30 | Scoring by quarter: 25–17, 13–15, 18–9, 17–12 |
| BBL Player | | boxscore report | | Attendance: 1,112 |

| 26 March 2022 | Surrey Scorchers | 76–102 | Leicester Riders | Surrey Sports Park, Guildford |
| 18:00 | Scoring by quarter: 18–28, 21–26, 19–26, 18–22 |
| BBL Player | | boxscore report | | Attendance: 700 |

| 26 March 2022 | Bristol Flyers | 74–77 | London Lions | SGS College Arena, Bristol |
| 19:30 | Scoring by quarter: 19–10, 15–24, 23–20, 17–23 |
| BBL Player | | boxscore report | | Attendance: not available |

| 27 March 2022 | Glasgow Rocks | 100–99 | Manchester Giants | Emirates Arena, Glasgow |
| 17:00 | Scoring by quarter: 20–22, 31–31, 26–29, 23–17 |
| BBL Player | | boxscore report | | Attendance: 400 |

| 27 March 2022 | Cheshire Phoenix | 113–66 | Surrey Scorchers | Cheshire Oaks Arena, Ellesmere Port |
| 17:30 | Scoring by quarter: 28–17, 29–19, 31–12, 25–18 |
| BBL Player | | boxscore report | | Attendance: 1,500 |

=== Round 21 ===
| 30 March 2022 | London Lions | 92–74 | Newcastle Eagles | Copper Box Arena, London |
| 19:30 | Scoring by quarter: 22–21, 27–18, 21–19, 22–16 |
| BBL Player | | boxscore report | | Attendance: 500 |

| 1 April 2022 | Sheffield Sharks | 71–61 | Plymouth City Patriots | Ponds Forge, Sheffield |
| 19:30 | Scoring by quarter: 24–12, 12–17, 13–15, 22–17 |
| BBL Player | | boxscore report | | Attendance: 642 |

| 1 April 2022 | Newcastle Eagles | 77–103 | Leicester Riders | Vertu Motors Arena, Newcastle |
| 19:30 | Scoring by quarter: 14–28, 31–30, 13–26, 19–19 |
| Sky Sports | | boxscore report | | Attendance: 2,800 |

| 1 April 2022 | London Lions | 79–66 | Bristol Flyers | Copper Box Arena, London |
| 19:30 | Scoring by quarter: 17–21, 19–16, 19–18, 24–11 |
| BBL Player | | boxscore report | | Attendance: 1,000 |

| 1 April 2022 | Glasgow Rocks | 107–77 | Surrey Scorchers | Emirates Arena, Glasgow |
| 19:30 | Scoring by quarter: 27–14, 20–14, 24–27, 36–22 |
| BBL Player | | boxscore report | | Attendance: 400 |

| 2 April 2022 | Bristol Flyers | 89–96 | Manchester Giants | SGS College Arena, Bristol |
| 19:30 | Scoring by quarter: 18–25, 21–22, 21–26, 29–23 |
| BBL Player | | boxscore report | | Attendance: not available |

| 3 April 2022 | London Lions | 69–54 | Sheffield Sharks | Copper Box Arena, London |
| 16:00 | Scoring by quarter: 11–11, 20–16, 17–15, 21–12 |
| BBL Player | | boxscore report | | Attendance: not available |

| 3 April 2022 | Glasgow Rocks | 103–77 | Cheshire Phoenix | Emirates Arena, Glasgow |
| 17:00 | Scoring by quarter: 21–23, 32–15, 28–26, 22–13 |
| BBL Player | | boxscore report | | Attendance: 750 |

=== Round 22 ===
| 6 April 2022 | Plymouth City Patriots | 60–77 | Leicester Riders | Plymouth Pavilions, Plymouth |
| 19:00 | Scoring by quarter: 17–19, 14–24, 15–24, 14–10 |
| BBL Player | | boxscore report | | Attendance: not available |

| 6 April 2022 | London Lions | 74–78 | Bristol Flyers | Copper Box Arena, London |
| 19:30 | Scoring by quarter: 23–23, 22–19, 21–15, 8–21 |
| BBL Player | | boxscore report | | Attendance: 1,500 |

| 8 April 2022 | Leicester Riders | 88–82 | Manchester Giants | Morningside Arena, Leicester |
| 19:30 | Scoring by quarter: 20–21, 20–14, 22–26, 26–21 |
| Sky Sports | | boxscore report | | Attendance: 666 |

| 8 April 2022 | Newcastle Eagles | 75–90 | Cheshire Phoenix | Vertu Motors Arena, Newcastle |
| 19:30 | Scoring by quarter: 21–16, 20–28, 16–21, 18–25 |
| BBL Player | | boxscore report | | Attendance: 2,700 |

| 8 April 2022 | Bristol Flyers | 72–75(OT) | Sheffield Sharks | SGS College Arena, Bristol |
| 19:30 | Scoring by quarter: 13–17, 17–13, 20–11, 16–25, Overtime: 6–9 |
| BBL Player | | boxscore report | | Attendance: 770 |

| 9 April 2022 | Surrey Scorchers | 84–98 | Plymouth City Patriots | Surrey Sports Park, Guildford |
| 18:00 | Scoring by quarter: 30–25, 10–28, 20–29, 24–16 |
| BBL Player | | boxscore report | | Attendance: 400 |

| 10 April 2022 | Glasgow Rocks | 83–75 | London Lions | Emirates Arena, Glasgow |
| 17:00 | Scoring by quarter: 30–16, 14–18, 15–15, 24–26 |
| BBL Player | | boxscore report | | Attendance: 400 |

| 10 April 2022 | Manchester Giants | 85–67 | Surrey Scorchers | National Basketball Centre, Manchester |
| 17:00 | Scoring by quarter: 31–15, 13–12, 16–17, 25–23 |
| BBL Player | | boxscore report | | Attendance: 1,027 |

| 10 April 2022 | Cheshire Phoenix | 71–76 | Sheffield Sharks | Cheshire Oaks Arena, Ellesmere Port |
| 17:30 | Scoring by quarter: 17–15, 18–24, 21–23, 15–14 |
| BBL Player | | boxscore report | | Attendance: not available |

=== Round 23 ===
| 12 April 2022 | Bristol Flyers | 87–66 | Manchester Giants | SGS College Arena, Bristol |
| 19:30 | Scoring by quarter: 16–20, 26–15, 24–16, 21–15 |
| BBL Player | | boxscore report | | Attendance: not available |

| 13 April 2022 | Plymouth City Patriots | 115–105 | Glasgow Rocks | Plymouth Pavilions, Plymouth |
| 19:00 | Scoring by quarter: 32–16, 21–34, 30–19, 32–36 |
| BBL Player | | boxscore report | | Attendance: not available |

| 13 April 2022 | Surrey Scorchers | 73–86 | Bristol Flyers | Surrey Sports Park, Guildford |
| 19:30 | Scoring by quarter: 13–24, 18–19, 21–20, 21–23 |
| BBL Player | | boxscore report | | Attendance: 650 |

| 15 April 2022 | Newcastle Eagles | 77–90 | Bristol Flyers | Vertu Motors Arena , Newcastle |
| 19:30 | Scoring by quarter: 19–28, 20–17, 20–18, 18–27 |
| BBL Player | | boxscore report | | Attendance: 2,700 |

| 15 April 2022 | Sheffield Sharks | 78–71(OT) | London Lions | Ponds Forge, Sheffield |
| 19:30 | Scoring by quarter: 12–11, 23–18, 16–22, 13–13, Overtime: 14–7 |
| Sky Sports | | boxscore report | | Attendance: 800 |

| 17 April 2022 | Surrey Scorchers | 81–104 | Newcastle Eagles | Surrey Sports Park, Guildford |
| 14:00 | Scoring by quarter: 23–22, 19–28, 24–33, 15–21 |
| BBL Player | | boxscore report | | Attendance: 200 |

| 17 April 2022 | Sheffield Sharks | 76–77 | Glasgow Rocks | Ponds Forge, Sheffield |
| 16:00 | Scoring by quarter: 20–22, 17–20, 18–18, 21–17 |
| BBL Player | | boxscore report | | Attendance: not available |

| 17 April 2022 | Leicester Riders | 103–67 | London Lions | Morningside Arena, Leicester |
| 16:00 | Scoring by quarter: 33–15, 29–22, 21–18, 20–12 |
| BBL Player | | boxscore report | | Attendance: not available |

=== Round 24 ===
| 18 April 2022 | Bristol Flyers | 84–81 | Newcastle Eagles | SGS College Arena, Bristol |
| 16:00 | Scoring by quarter: 29–26, 15–23, 21–18, 19–14 |
| BBL Player | | boxscore report | | Attendance: not available |

| 19 April 2022 | Glasgow Rocks | 86–101 | Leicester Riders | Emirates Arena, Glasgow |
| 19:30 | Scoring by quarter: 22–24, 22–29, 17–30, 25–18 |
| BBL Player | | boxscore report | | Attendance: 600 |

| 20 April 2022 | London Lions | 92–71 | Surrey Scorchers | Surrey Sports Park, Guildford |
| 19:30 | Scoring by quarter: 27–19, 23–20, 26–14, 16–18 |
| BBL Player | | boxscore report | | Attendance: not available |

| 22 April 2022 | London Lions | 99–62 | Cheshire Phoenix | Copper Box Arena, London |
| 19:30 | Scoring by quarter: 24–17, 24–15, 24–17, 27–13 |
| BBL Player | | boxscore report | | Attendance: 1,500 |

| 22 April 2022 | Newcastle Eagles | 93–80 | Glasgow Rocks | Vertu Motors Arena, Newcastle |
| 19:30 | Scoring by quarter: 30–28, 24–12, 28–23, 11–17 |
| BBL Player | | boxscore report | | Attendance: not available |

| 22 April 2022 | Sheffield Sharks | 91–86 | Manchester Giants | Ponds Forge, Sheffield |
| 19:30 | Scoring by quarter: 13–31, 29–18, 25–21, 24–16 |
| BBL Player | | boxscore report | | Attendance: not available |

| 22 April 2022 | Leicester Riders | 92–82 | Plymouth City Patriots | Morningside Arena, Leicester |
| 20:00 | Scoring by quarter: 24–25, 24–16, 18–22, 26–19 |
| Sky Sports | | boxscore report | | Attendance: 666 |

| 23 April 2022 | Bristol Flyers | 95–55 | Surrey Scorchers | SGS College Arena, Bristol |
| 19:30 | Scoring by quarter: 26–18, 20–12, 25–12, 23–13 |
| BBL Player | | boxscore report | | Attendance: not available |

| 24 April 2022 | Surrey Scorchers | 69–83 | Sheffield Sharks | Surrey Sports Park, Guildford |
| 14:00 | Scoring by quarter: 14–24, 20–25, 14–21, 21–13 |
| BBL Player | | boxscore report | | Attendance: 400 |

| 24 April 2022 | Plymouth City Patriots | 80–72 | Newcastle Eagles | Plymouth Pavilions, Plymouth |
| 15:00 | Scoring by quarter: 20–16, 23–18, 17–20, 20–18 |
| BBL Player | | boxscore report | | Attendance: 1,500 |

| 24 April 2022 | Cheshire Phoenix | 101–100 | Bristol Flyers | Cheshire Oaks Arena, Ellesmere Port |
| 17:30 | Scoring by quarter: 29–22, 27–15, 18–30, 27–33 |
| BBL Player | | boxscore report | | Attendance: not available |

| 24 April 2022 | Manchester Giants | 80–90 | London Lions | National Basketball Centre, Manchester |
| 20:00 | Scoring by quarter: 14–27, 22–13, 26–24, 18–26 |
| BBL Player | | boxscore report | | Attendance: not available |

| Preceded by 2020–21 season | BBL seasons 2021–22 | Succeeded by 2022–23 season |
