= 2020–21 BBL Championship =

British Basketball League season

The 2020–21 BBL Championship of the 2020–21 BBL season, the 34th season of the British Basketball League started on 3 December 2020 to 30 April 2021.

== Ladder ==
The BBL Championship will return to the three game series format used prior to the 2019–20 season, for a 30-game regular season. There will be 21 Rounds between 3 December 2020 and 30 April 2021.

=== Standings ===
Pos	Team	Pld	W	L	PF	PA	PD	Pts	Qualification
1	Leicester Riders (C)	30	24	6	2580	2303	+277	48	Playoffs
2	London Lions	30	23	7	2702	2441	+261	46	Playoffs
3	Plymouth Raiders	30	21	9	2511	2307	+204	42	Playoffs
4	Newcastle Eagles	30	18	12	2576	2543	+33	36	Playoffs
5	Sheffield Sharks	30	15	15	2403	2338	+65	30	Playoffs
6	Worcester Wolves	30	14	16	2349	2456	−107	28	Playoffs
7	Cheshire Phoenix	30	14	16	2357	2407	−50	28	Playoffs
8	Bristol Flyers	30	12	18	2346	2373	−27	24	Playoffs
9	Surrey Scorchers	30	10	20	2446	2615	−169	20	
10	Manchester Giants	30	10	20	2514	2601	−87	20	
11	Glasgow Rocks	30	4	26	2214	2614	−400	8	

Updated to match(es) played on 30 April 2021. Source: BBC Sport
(C) Champions

=== Ladder progression ===
- Numbers highlighted in green indicate that the team finished the round inside the top eight.
- Numbers highlighted in blue indicates the team finished first on the ladder in that round.
- Numbers highlighted in red indicates the team finished last place on the ladder in that round.

Team	1	2	3	4	5	6	7	8	9	10	11	12	13	14	15	16	17	18	19	20	21	22
Bristol Flyers	7	5	5	5	5	6	7	8	9	9	9	9	7	8	8	8	8	8	8	8	8	8
Cheshire Phoenix	6	11	11	10	8	9	8	9	8	8	7	5	6	6	3	3	4	5	5	6	7	7
Glasgow Rocks	10	10	10	11	11	11	10	10	11	11	11	11	11	11	11	11	11	11	11	11	11	11
Leicester Riders	3	1	3	3	4	3	3	3	1	1	1	1	1	1	1	1	1	1	1	1	1	1
London Lions	8	3	1	2	2	1	1	1	2	3	3	3	3	4	4	4	5	4	2	2	2	2
Manchester Giants	1	6	6	6	6	5	4	4	4	6	8	7	9	9	9	10	10	10	10	10	9	10
Newcastle Eagles	5	2	2	1	1	2	2	2	3	2	2	2	2	2	2	2	2	3	4	4	4	4
Plymouth Raiders	2	7	7	7	7	7	9	7	5	4	4	6	5	3	5	5	3	2	3	3	3	3
Sheffield Sharks	4	4	4	4	3	4	5	5	7	5	5	4	4	5	6	6	6	7	7	5	5	5
Surrey Scorchers	11	9	9	9	9	10	11	11	10	10	10	10	10	10	10	9	9	9	9	9	10	9
Worcester Wolves	9	8	8	8	10	8	6	6	6	7	6	8	8	7	7	7	7	6	6	7	6	6

== Games ==
=== Round 1 ===
3 December 2020	Sheffield Sharks	82–92	Cheshire Phoenix	Eagles Community Arena, Newcastle
17:00	Scoring by quarter: 18–27, 19–20, 26–18, 19–27
Sky Sports		boxscore report		Attendance: 0 (Note: Match played behind closed doors due to the COVID-19 pandemic in the United Kingdom.)

3 December 2020	Newcastle Eagles	88–79	London Lions	Eagles Community Arena, Newcastle
19:30	Scoring by quarter: 20–22, 18–15, 17–15, 33–27
Sky Sports		boxscore report		Attendance: 0

4 December 2020	Worcester Wolves	60–69	Plymouth Raiders	Worcester Arena, Worcester
19:00	Scoring by quarter: 23–24, 16–13, 12–16, 9–16
YouTube		boxscore report		Attendance: 0

4 December 2020	Bristol Flyers	59–66	Manchester Giants	SGS College Arena, Bristol
19:30	Scoring by quarter: 18–14, 17–14, 15–16, 9–22
Flyers TV		boxscore report		Attendance: 0

5 December 2020	Surrey Scorchers	72–84	Leicester Riders	Surrey Sports Park, Guildford
18:00	Scoring by quarter: 14–21, 14–25, 22–17, 22–21
YouTube		boxscore report		Attendance: 10

6 December 2020	Plymouth Raiders	77–76	Newcastle Eagles	Plymouth Pavilions, Plymouth
15:00	Scoring by quarter: 21–18, 20–14, 10–18, 26–26
BBL TV		boxscore report		Attendance: 0

6 December 2020	Sheffield Sharks	105–61	Surrey Scorchers	Ponds Forge, Sheffield
15:00	Scoring by quarter: 22–13, 23–14, 30–20, 30–14
BBL TV		boxscore report		Attendance: 0

6 December 2020	Cheshire Phoenix	81–84(OT)	Bristol Flyers	Cheshire Oaks Arena, Ellesmere Port
17:00	Scoring by quarter: 23–19, 13–13, 13–17, 22–22, Overtime: 10–13
BBL TV		boxscore report		Attendance: 0

6 December 2020	Manchester Giants	86–66	Glasgow Rocks	National Basketball Performance Centre, Manchester
17:00	Scoring by quarter: 16–14, 25–15, 22–23, 23–14
BBL TV		boxscore report		Attendance: 10

=== Round 2 ===
11 December 2020	Worcester Wolves	84–76	Manchester Giants	Worcester Arena, Worcester
19:00	Scoring by quarter: 21–18, 22–21, 20–23, 21–14
YouTube		boxscore report		Attendance: 4

11 December 2020	London Lions	101–95	Plymouth Raiders	Copper Box Arena, London
19:30	Scoring by quarter: 18–27, 33–22, 34–19, 16–27
Sky Sports		boxscore report		Attendance: 40

11 December 2020	Leicester Riders	74–64	Sheffield Sharks	Morningside Arena, Leicester
20:00	Scoring by quarter: 17–17, 15–18, 22–15, 20–14
BBL TV		boxscore report		Attendance: 44

12 December 2020	Surrey Scorchers	74–70	Cheshire Phoenix	Surrey Sports Park, Guildford
18:00	Scoring by quarter: 18–14, 20–20, 19–15, 17–21
BBL TV		boxscore report		Attendance: 11

12 December 2020	Bristol Flyers	96–54	Glasgow Rocks	SGS College Arena, Bristol
18:30	Scoring by quarter: 18–17, 22–16, 37–3, 19–18
Flyers TV		boxscore report		Attendance: 0

13 December 2020	Plymouth Raiders	61–63(OT)	Glasgow Rocks	Plymouth Pavilions, Plymouth
15:00	Scoring by quarter: 13–7, 15–18, 18–9, 8–20, Overtime: 7–9
BBL TV		boxscore report		Attendance: 0

13 December 2020	Sheffield Sharks	87–62	Bristol Flyers	Ponds Forge, Sheffield
16:00	Scoring by quarter: 27–16, 28–14, 14–20, 18–12
BBL TV		boxscore report		Attendance: 33

13 December 2020	Cheshire Phoenix	99–110	London Lions	Cheshire Oaks Arena, Ellesmere Port
17:00	Scoring by quarter: 21–27, 26–27, 24–29, 28–27
BBL TV		boxscore report		Attendance: 50

13 December 2020	Manchester Giants	84–98	Newcastle Eagles	National Basketball Performance Centre, Manchester
17:00	Scoring by quarter: 20–27, 20–17, 22–33, 22–21
BBL TV		boxscore report		Attendance: 10

=== Round 3 ===
18 December 2020	London Lions	92–88	Manchester Giants	Copper Box Arena, London
19:00	Scoring by quarter: 19–34, 33–24, 25–16, 15–14
BBL TV		boxscore report		Attendance: 0

18 December 2020	Leicester Riders	85–73	Bristol Flyers	Morningside Arena, Leicester
19:30	Scoring by quarter: 34–19, 22–21, 14–14, 15–19
Sky Sports		boxscore report		Attendance: 50

18 December 2020	Newcastle Eagles	88–75	Worcester Wolves	Eagles Community Arena, Newcastle
19:30	Scoring by quarter: 22–21, 28–15, 19–20, 19–19
BBL TV		boxscore report		Attendance: 0

20 December 2020	Surrey Scorchers	79–99	Bristol Flyers	Surrey Sports Park, Guildford
14:00	Scoring by quarter: 19–28, 18–24, 21–22, 21–25
BBL TV		boxscore report		Attendance: 1

20 December 2020	Cheshire Phoenix	84–85	Newcastle Eagles	Cheshire Oaks Arena, Ellesmere Port
17:00	Scoring by quarter: 17–27, 29–16, 13–24, 25–18
BBL TV		boxscore report		Attendance: 0

20 December 2020	Glasgow Rocks	78–96	Sheffield Sharks	Emirates Arena, Glasgow
17:00	Scoring by quarter: 16–22, 21–19, 15–30, 26–25
BBL TV		boxscore report		Attendance: 5

20 December 2020	Manchester Giants	88–79	Plymouth Raiders	National Basketball Performance Centre, Manchester
17:00	Scoring by quarter: 17–18, 31–22, 16–18, 24–21
BBL TV		boxscore report		Attendance: 0

21 December 2020	London Lions	103–71	Worcester Wolves	Copper Box Arena, London
19:00	Scoring by quarter: 34–17, 26–11, 27–22, 16–21
BBL TV		boxscore report		Attendance: 20

=== Round 4 ===
27 December 2020	Glasgow Rocks	93–105	Newcastle Eagles	Emirates Arena, Glasgow
14:00	Scoring by quarter: 24–23, 16–28, 27–28, 26–26
BBL TV		boxscore report		Attendance: 4

- Surrey Scorchers’ BBL Championship fixtures against Worcester Wolves (28 December), London Lions (1 January) and Leicester Riders (3 January) have been postponed due to self-isolation requirements following a player testing positive for COVID-19. Under the Covid-19 rule amendments, these fixtures will be rescheduled as soon as possible.
- With an abundance of caution, the game between Leicester Riders and Bristol Flyers scheduled for 23 December has also been postponed and will be rescheduled as soon as possible.

=== Round 5 ===
30 December 2020	Plymouth Raiders	72–58	Worcester Wolves	Plymouth Pavilions, Plymouth
19:30	Scoring by quarter: 24–18, 8–10, 22–13, 18–17
BBL TV		boxscore report		Attendance: 0

3 January 2021	Glasgow Rocks	64–75	Cheshire Phoenix	Emirates Arena, Glasgow
15:00	Scoring by quarter: 8–16, 19–20, 17–16, 20–23
BBL TV		boxscore report		Attendance: 6

3 January 2021	Sheffield Sharks	83–78	Plymouth Raiders	Ponds Forge, Sheffield
15:00	Scoring by quarter: 20–18, 23–23, 14–21, 26–16
BBL TV		boxscore report		Attendance: 0

3 January 2021	Leicester Riders	73–74	London Lions	Morningside Arena, Leicester
18:00	Scoring by quarter: 19–19, 20–25, 20–18, 14–12
BBL TV		boxscore report		Attendance: 45

=== Round 6 ===
7 January 2021	Plymouth Raiders	71–77	Leicester Riders	Plymouth Pavilions, Plymouth
19:30	Scoring by quarter: 16–19, 22–18, 10–22, 23–18
BBL TV		boxscore report		Attendance: 0

8 January 2021	Cheshire Phoenix	74–84	Manchester Giants	Worcester Arena, Worcester
17:00	Scoring by quarter: 13–27, 26–15, 20–20, 15–22
Sky Sports		boxscore report		Attendance: 0

8 January 2021	London Lions	109–89	Newcastle Eagles	Copper Box Arena, London
19:00	Scoring by quarter: 29–22, 30–14, 22–27, 28–26
BBL TV		boxscore report		Attendance: 0

8 January 2021	Worcester Wolves	83–77	Glasgow Rocks	Worcester Arena, Worcester
19:30	Scoring by quarter: 29–20, 20–15, 20–21, 14–21
Sky Sports		boxscore report		Attendance: 23

9 January 2021	London Lions	91–74	Glasgow Rocks	Copper Box Arena, London
14:30	Scoring by quarter: 28–20, 30–18, 11–21, 22–15
BBL TV		boxscore report		Attendance: 0

- Surrey Scorchers’ BBL Championship fixture against Plymouth Raiders (10 January) has been postponed on advice of Surrey’s club doctor, in line with the BBL’s return to play guidelines, following the return to play of multiple players and coaches after testing positive for Covid-19. Under the Covis-19 rule amendments, this fixture will be rescheduled as soon as possible.
- With an abundance of caution, the game between Cheshire Phoenix and B Braun Sheffield Sharks scheduled for Sunday 10 January has been postponed and will be rescheduled as soon as possible.

=== Round 7 ===
15 January 2021	Worcester Wolves	73–71	Cheshire Phoenix	Worcester Arena, Worcester
19:00	Scoring by quarter: 12–14, 25–10, 21–22, 15–25
YouTube		boxscore report		Attendance: 0

15 January 2021	Bristol Flyers	70–98	London Lions	SGS College Arena, Bristol
19:30	Scoring by quarter: 11–30, 21–21, 22–21, 16–26
Flyers TV		boxscore report		Attendance: 15

15 January 2021	Plymouth Raiders	70–82	Leicester Riders	Plymouth Pavilions, Plymouth
19:30	Scoring by quarter: 21–18, 12–16, 15–19, 22–29
BBL TV		boxscore report		Attendance: 0

15 January 2021	Sheffield Sharks	84–92	Newcastle Eagles	Ponds Forge, Sheffield
19:30	Scoring by quarter: 20–21, 17–28, 14–23, 33–20
Sky Sports		boxscore report		Attendance: 0

17 January 2021	Bristol Flyers	73–76	Worcester Wolves	SGS College Arena, Bristol
15:00	Scoring by quarter: 16–18, 16–19, 18–21, 23–18
Flyers TV		boxscore report		Attendance: 15

17 January 2021	Glasgow Rocks	65–54	Sheffield Sharks	Emirates Arena, Glasgow
15:30	Scoring by quarter: 8–8, 18–13, 18–17, 21–16
BBL TV		boxscore report		Attendance: 4

17 January 2021	Cheshire Phoenix	92–87	Surrey Scorchers	Cheshire Oaks Arena, Ellesmere Port
17:00	Scoring by quarter: 21–23, 19–26, 18–19, 34–19
BBL TV		boxscore report		Attendance: 50

17 January 2021	Newcastle Eagles	77–76	Plymouth Raiders	Eagles Community Arena, Newcastle
17:30	Scoring by quarter: 21–19, 21–21, 14–15, 21–21
BBL TV		boxscore report		Attendance: 0

=== Round 8 ===
20 January 2021	Plymouth Raiders	82–76	Cheshire Phoenix	Plymouth Pavilions, Plymouth
19:30	Scoring by quarter: 18–12, 21–18, 15–16, 28–30
BBL TV		boxscore report		Attendance: 0

23 January 2021	Surrey Scorchers	66–80	Manchester Giants	Surrey Sports Park, Guildford
15:00	Scoring by quarter: 18–16, 20–19, 8–25, 20–20
BBL TV		boxscore report		Attendance: 4

24 January 2021	Leicester Riders	90–58	Glasgow Rocks	Morningside Arena, Leicester
13:00	Scoring by quarter: 23–14, 25–8, 22–19, 20–17
Sky Sports		boxscore report		Attendance: 15

=== Round 9 ===
29 January 2021	Newcastle Eagles	88–83	Bristol Flyers	Eagles Community Arena, Newcastle
18:00	Scoring by quarter: 27–26, 22–15, 21–18, 18–24
BBL TV		boxscore report		Attendance: 2

29 January 2021	Leicester Riders	75–73	Sheffield Sharks	Morningside Arena, Leicester
18:00	Scoring by quarter: 16–17, 22–22, 19–11, 18–23
BBL TV		boxscore report		Attendance: 33

29 January 2021	Glasgow Rocks	86–93	Surrey Scorchers	Emirates Arena, Glasgow
19:30	Scoring by quarter: 25–24, 22–20, 24–30, 15–19
Sky Sports		boxscore report		Attendance: 3

29 January 2021	Plymouth Raiders	97–74	Manchester Giants	Plymouth Pavilions, Plymouth
19:30	Scoring by quarter: 23–14, 23–23, 22–17, 29–20
BBL TV		boxscore report		Attendance: 0

31 January 2021	Leicester Riders	103–76	Surrey Scorchers	Morningside Arena, Leicester
15:00	Scoring by quarter: 23–25, 32–18, 30–16, 18–17
BBL TV		boxscore report		Attendance: 33

31 January 2021	Manchester Giants	70–88	Cheshire Phoenix	National Basketball Performance Centre, Manchester
17:00	Scoring by quarter: 15–26, 17–33, 19–7, 19–22
BBL TV		boxscore report		Attendance: 0

=== Round 10 ===
5 February 2021	Leicester Riders	116–109(OT)	Manchester Giants	Morningside Arena, Leicester
18:00	Scoring by quarter: 33–32, 25–25, 25–17, 19–28, Overtime: 14–7
BBL TV		boxscore report		Attendance: 33

5 February 2021	Newcastle Eagles	94–85	Worcester Wolves	Eagles Community Arena, Newcastle
18:00	Scoring by quarter: 29–20, 30–20, 20–24, 15–21
BBL TV		boxscore report		Attendance: 1

5 February 2021	Sheffield Sharks	77–61	Glasgow Rocks	Ponds Forge, Sheffield
18:00	Scoring by quarter: 21–16, 11–24, 22–10, 23–11
BBL TV		boxscore report		Attendance: 0

5 February 2021	Plymouth Raiders	87–65	Bristol Flyers	Plymouth Pavilions, Plymouth
19:30	Scoring by quarter: 25–20, 24–11, 14–23, 24–11
Sky Sports		boxscore report		Attendance: 0

6 February 2021	Surrey Scorchers	87–90	Bristol Flyers	Surrey Sports Park, Guildford
17:00	Scoring by quarter: 22–30, 27–17, 18–21, 20–22
BBL TV		boxscore report		Attendance: 10

7 February 2021	London Lions	75–81	Plymouth Raiders	Copper Box Arena, London
14:30	Scoring by quarter: 25–23, 13–22, 18–18, 19–18
BBL TV		boxscore report		Attendance: 0

7 February 2021	Glasgow Rocks	78–97	Leicester Riders	Emirates Arena, Glasgow
15:00	Scoring by quarter: 12–24, 16–23, 24–31, 26–19
BBL TV		boxscore report		Attendance: 2

7 February 2021	Manchester Giants	76–90	Sheffield Sharks	National Basketball Performance Centre, Manchester
17:00	Scoring by quarter: 13–28, 24–21, 19–25, 20–16
BBL TV		boxscore report		Attendance: 50

=== Round 11 ===
12 February 2021	Newcastle Eagles	70–90	Sheffield Sharks	Eagles Community Arena, Newcastle
18:00	Scoring by quarter: 18–26, 15–14, 9–22, 28–28
BBL TV		boxscore report		Attendance: 5

12 February 2021	Worcester Wolves	82–104	Plymouth Raiders	Worcester Arena, Worcester
19:00	Scoring by quarter: 13–27, 33–27, 16–22, 20–28
YouTube		boxscore report		Attendance: 7

12 February 2021	Bristol Flyers	69–71	Cheshire Phoenix	SGS College Arena, Bristol
19:30	Scoring by quarter: 10–18, 14–20, 18–19, 27–14
Flyers TV		boxscore report		Attendance: 1

12 February 2021	Manchester Giants	86–93	Surrey Scorchers	National Basketball Performance Centre, Manchester
20:00	Scoring by quarter: 31–27, 19–22, 22–28, 14–16
Sky Sports		boxscore report		Attendance: 0

13 February 2021	Surrey Scorchers	75–77	Worcester Wolves	Surrey Sports Park, Guildford
18:00	Scoring by quarter: 14–25, 28–13, 19–14, 14–25
BBL TV		boxscore report		Attendance: 1

14 February 2021	Plymouth Raiders	70–87	London Lions	Plymouth Pavilions, Plymouth
15:00	Scoring by quarter: 11–16, 19–20, 16–22, 24–29
BBL TV		boxscore report		Attendance: 0

14 February 2021	Sheffield Sharks	93–107	Leicester Riders	Ponds Forge, Sheffield
15:00	Scoring by quarter: 18–31, 24–23, 21–26, 30–27
BBL TV		boxscore report		Attendance: 0

14 February 2021	Bristol Flyers	66–74	Newcastle Eagles	SGS College Arena, Bristol
17:00	Scoring by quarter: 9–14, 22–23, 15–17, 20–20
Flyers TV		boxscore report		Attendance: 1

=== Round 12 ===
17 February 2021	Cheshire Phoenix	77–68	Worcester Wolves	Cheshire Oaks Arena, Ellesmere Port
18:00	Scoring by quarter: 25–15, 16–22, 16–19, 20–12
BBL TV		boxscore report		Attendance: 12

17 February 2021	Leicester Riders	83–75	Newcastle Eagles	Morningside Arena, Leicester
18:00	Scoring by quarter: 18–20, 21–19, 20–17, 24–19
BBL TV		boxscore report		Attendance: 0

19 February 2021	Cheshire Phoenix	87–80	London Lions	Cheshire Oaks Arena, Ellesmere Port
18:00	Scoring by quarter: 21–23, 30–12, 17–24, 19–21
BBL TV		boxscore report		Attendance: 50

19 February 2021	Worcester Wolves	78–98	Manchester Giants	Worcester Arena, Worcester
19:00	Scoring by quarter: 18–24, 17–20, 18–35, 25–19
YouTube		boxscore report		Attendance: 1

19 February 2021	Newcastle Eagles	77–89	Sheffield Sharks	Eagles Community Arena, Newcastle
19:30	Scoring by quarter: 23–18, 21–17, 15–24, 18–30
Sky Sports		boxscore report		Attendance: 0

21 February 2021	Sheffield Sharks	57–67	Cheshire Phoenix	Ponds Forge, Sheffield
15:00	Scoring by quarter: 19–19, 14–15, 15–11, 9–22
BBL TV		boxscore report		Attendance: 0

21 February 2021	Manchester Giants	77–91	Leicester Riders	National Basketball Performance Centre, Manchester
17:00	Scoring by quarter: 23–20, 17–21, 16–23, 21–27
BBL TV		boxscore report		Attendance: 10

=== Round 13 ===
24 February 2021	Surrey Scorchers	97–98	London Lions	Surrey Sports Park, Guildford
18:00	Scoring by quarter: 23–16, 21–28, 24–33, 29–21
BBL TV		boxscore report		Attendance: 1

26 February 2021	Newcastle Eagles	80–73	Cheshire Phoenix	Eagles Community Arena, Newcastle
18:00	Scoring by quarter: 22–15, 10–19, 21–19, 27–20
BBL TV		boxscore report		Attendance: 0

26 February 2021	Sheffield Sharks	81–80	Manchester Giants	Ponds Forge, Sheffield
18:00	Scoring by quarter: 21–18, 22–26, 25–16, 13–20
BBL TV		boxscore report		Attendance: 0

26 February 2021	Bristol Flyers	89–67	Surrey Scorchers	SGS College Arena, Bristol
19:30	Scoring by quarter: 18–13, 21–18, 27–19, 23–17
Flyers TV		boxscore report		Attendance: 1

26 February 2021	Leicester Riders	82–81	Worcester Wolves	Morningside Arena, Leicester
19:30	Scoring by quarter: 23–23, 17–23, 20–9, 22–26
Sky Sports		boxscore report		Attendance: 0

26 February 2021	Plymouth Raiders	63–60	Glasgow Rocks	Plymouth Pavilions, Plymouth
19:30	Scoring by quarter: 16–17, 17–9, 16–20, 14–14
BBL TV		boxscore report		Attendance: 0

28 February 2021	Glasgow Rocks	67–92	Plymouth Raiders	Emirates Arena, Glasgow
15:00	Scoring by quarter: 15–32, 15–18, 18–23, 19–19
BBL TV		boxscore report		Attendance: 1

28 February 2021	Sheffield Sharks	83–72	London Lions	Ponds Forge, Sheffield
15:00	Scoring by quarter: 22–22, 22–14, 18–21, 21–15
BBL TV		boxscore report		Attendance: 0

28 February 2021	Worcester Wolves	84–82(OT)	Leicester Riders	Worcester Arena, Worcester
15:00	Scoring by quarter: 24–20, 12–13, 22–18, 16–23, Overtime: 10–8
YouTube		boxscore report		Attendance: 6

28 February 2021	Cheshire Phoenix	74–76	Surrey Scorchers	Cheshire Oaks Arena, Ellesmere Port
17:00	Scoring by quarter: 18–22, 20–15, 9–23, 27–16
BBL TV		boxscore report		Attendance: 0

28 February 2021	Manchester Giants	89–93	Bristol Flyers	National Basketball Performance Centre, Manchester
17:00	Scoring by quarter: 26–27, 14–19, 17–18, 32–29
BBL TV		boxscore report		Attendance: 0

=== Round 14 ===
3 March 2021	Worcester Wolves	88–72	Sheffield Sharks	Worcester Arena, Worcester
19:00	Scoring by quarter: 27–19, 30–20, 14–10, 17–23
YouTube		boxscore report		Attendance: 8

5 March 2021	Newcastle Eagles	72–85	Plymouth Raiders	Eagles Community Arena, Newcastle
18:00	Scoring by quarter: 21–21, 20–26, 13–21, 18–17
BBL TV		boxscore report		Attendance: 1

5 March 2021	Cheshire Phoenix	93–91	Leicester Riders	Cheshire Oaks Arena, Ellesmere Port
18:00	Scoring by quarter: 16–26, 26–16, 21–25, 30–24
BBL TV		boxscore report		Attendance: 0

5 March 2021	Worcester Wolves	84–77	Surrey Scorchers	Worcester Arena, Worcester
19:30	Scoring by quarter: 22–22, 14–23, 25–17, 23–15
Sky Sports		boxscore report		Attendance: 14

6 March 2021	Surrey Scorchers	81–60	Glasgow Rocks	Surrey Sports Park, Guildford
19:00	Scoring by quarter: 16–15, 23–10, 24–16, 18–19
BBL TV		boxscore report		Attendance: 0

7 March 2021	Manchester Giants	76–101	Newcastle Eagles	National Basketball Performance Centre, Manchester
17:00	Scoring by quarter: 22–27, 22–25, 20–26, 12–23
BBL TV		boxscore report		Attendance: 0

7 March 2021	Cheshire Phoenix	75–69	Sheffield Sharks	Cheshire Oaks Arena, Ellesmere Port
17:00	Scoring by quarter: 22–14, 14–18, 24–18, 15–19
BBL TV		boxscore report		Attendance: 0

=== Round 15 ===
12 March 2021	London Lions	105–81	Manchester Giants	Copper Box Arena, London
18:00	Scoring by quarter: 32–22, 29–20, 26–15, 18–24
BBL TV		boxscore report		Attendance: 0

12 March 2021	Sheffield Sharks	74–75	Worcester Wolves	Ponds Forge, Sheffield
18:00	Scoring by quarter: 15–17, 16–24, 23–18, 20–16
BBL TV		boxscore report		Attendance: 4

12 March 2021	Bristol Flyers	75–81	Cheshire Phoenix	SGS College Arena, Bristol
19:30	Scoring by quarter: 18–19, 28–24, 11–17, 18–21
Flyers TV		boxscore report		Attendance: 0

12 March 2021	Newcastle Eagles	73–99	Leicester Riders	Vertu Motors Arena, Newcastle
19:30	Scoring by quarter: 22–26, 18–25, 17–26, 16–22
Sky Sports		boxscore report		Attendance: 5

14 March 2021	Sheffield Sharks	82–79	Bristol Flyers	Ponds Forge, Sheffield
15:00	Scoring by quarter: 25–24, 18–16, 28–13, 11–26
BBL TV		boxscore report		Attendance: 0

14 March 2021	Cheshire Phoenix	77–75	Manchester Giants	Cheshire Oaks Arena, Ellesmere Port
17:00	Scoring by quarter: 17–23, 19–14, 21–22, 20–16
BBL TV		boxscore report		Attendance: 0

14 March 2021	Glasgow Rocks	88–81	Worcester Wolves	Emirates Arena, Glasgow
17:00	Scoring by quarter: 27–20, 15–15, 25–20, 21–26
BBL TV		boxscore report		Attendance: 5

14 March 2021	Leicester Riders	78–73	London Lions	Morningside Arena, Leicester
17:00	Scoring by quarter: 20–21, 24–23, 13–15, 21–14
BBL TV		boxscore report		Attendance: 22

=== Round 16 ===
17 March 2021	Leicester Riders	90–87	Surrey Scorchers	Morningside Arena, Leicester
18:00	Scoring by quarter: 27–22, 21–17, 21–27, 21–21
BBL TV		boxscore report		Attendance: 44

19 March 2021	Worcester Wolves	93–74	Glasgow Rocks	Worcester Arena, Worcester
19:00	Scoring by quarter: 19–17, 25–14, 24–18, 25–25
YouTube		boxscore report		Attendance: 7

20 March 2021	Surrey Scorchers	88–84	Newcastle Eagles	Surrey Sports Park Guildford
18:00	Scoring by quarter: 26–24, 22–15, 16–20, 24–25
BBL TV		boxscore report		Attendance: 1

20 March 2021	Bristol Flyers	91–84(OT)	Glasgow Rocks	SGS College Arena, Bristol
19:30	Scoring by quarter: 25–21, 17–22, 21–9, 12–23, Overtime: 16–9
Flyers TV		boxscore report		Attendance: 1

=== Round 17 ===
24 March 2021	Leicester Riders	82–70	Cheshire Phoenix	Morningside Arena, Leicester
18:00	Scoring by quarter: 15–18, 29–26, 16–23, 22–3
BBL TV		boxscore report		Attendance: 22

24 March 2021	Manchester Giants	97–90	Worcester Wolves	National Basketball Performance Centre, Manchester
19:30	Scoring by quarter: 30–17, 14–21, 22–22, 31–30
BBL TV		boxscore report		Attendance: 0

26 March 2021	Newcastle Eagles	109–95	London Lions	Vertu Motors Arena, Newcastle
18:00	Scoring by quarter: 36–17, 28–27, 21–26, 24–25
BBL TV		boxscore report		Attendance: 1

26 March 2021	Worcester Wolves	62–82	Bristol Flyers	Worcester Arena, Worcester
19:00	Scoring by quarter: 13–18, 28–18, 12–22, 9–24
YouTube		boxscore report		Attendance: 14

26 March 2021	Glasgow Rocks	104–94	Manchester Giants	Emirates Arena, Glasgow
19:30	Scoring by quarter: 18–23, 21–28, 33–16, 32–27
BBL TV		boxscore report		Attendance: 5

26 March 2021	Plymouth Raiders	89–74	Sheffield Sharks	Plymouth Pavilions, Plymouth
19:30	Scoring by quarter: 16–20, 23–22, 25–13, 25–19
Sky Sports		boxscore report		Attendance: 0

27 March 2021	Bristol Flyers	62–76	Leicester Riders	SGS College Arena, Bristol
19:30	Scoring by quarter: 17–15, 17–24, 18–23, 10–14
Flyers TV		boxscore report		Attendance: 1

28 March 2021	London Lions	72–84	Worcester Wolves	Copper Box Arena, London
14:30	Scoring by quarter: 18–28, 24–18, 12–20, 18–18
BBL TV		boxscore report		Attendance: 0

28 March 2021	Glasgow Rocks	83–99	Surrey Scorchers	Emirates Arena, Glasgow
15:00	Scoring by quarter: 18–22, 32–26, 15–22, 18–29
BBL TV		boxscore report		Attendance: 1

28 March 2021	Cheshire Phoenix	87–103	Newcastle Eagles	Cheshire Oaks Arena, Ellesmere Port
17:00	Scoring by quarter: 17–27, 19–29, 24–17, 27–30
BBL TV		boxscore report		Attendance: 0

28 March 2021	Manchester Giants	80–101	Plymouth Raiders	National Basketball Performance Centre, Manchester
17:00	Scoring by quarter: 29–25, 24–24, 5–23, 22–29
BBL TV		boxscore report		Attendance: 20

=== Round 18 ===
30 March 2021	Leicester Riders	54–80	Bristol Flyers	Morningside Arena, Leicester
18:00	Scoring by quarter: 16–18, 17–15, 14–19, 7–28
BBL TV		boxscore report		Attendance: 22

31 March 2021	London Lions	109–90	Surrey Scorchers	Copper Box Arena, London
18:00	Scoring by quarter: 23–25, 30–22, 29–18, 27–25
BBL TV		boxscore report		Attendance: 15

2 April 2021	London Lions	93–81	Sheffield Sharks	Vertu Motors Arena, Newcastle
17:00	Scoring by quarter: 23–16, 23–19, 25–21, 22–25
Sky Sports		boxscore report		Attendance: 5

2 April 2021	Surrey Scorchers	90–98	Plymouth Raiders	Surrey Sports Park, Guildford
18:00	Scoring by quarter: 23–32, 26–10, 18–31, 23–25
BBL TV		boxscore report		Attendance: 0

2 April 2021	Bristol Flyers	72–77	Worcester Wolves	SGS College Arena, Bristol
19:30	Scoring by quarter: 18–16, 16–19, 18–24, 20–18
Flyers TV		boxscore report		Attendance: 10

2 April 2021	Newcastle Eagles	98–78	Glasgow Rocks	Vertu Motors Arena, Newcastle
19:30	Scoring by quarter: 19–19, 23–15, 31–24, 25–20
Sky Sports		boxscore report		Attendance: 5

3 April 2021	Plymouth Raiders	88–83	Cheshire Phoenix	Plymouth Pavilions, Plymouth
19:30	Scoring by quarter: 15–18, 27–12, 23–21, 23–32
BBL TV		boxscore report		Attendance: 0

4 April 2021	Surrey Scorchers	87–67	Newcastle Eagles	Surrey Sports Park, Guildford
14:00	Scoring by quarter: 19–15, 23–17, 28–20, 17–15
BBL TV		boxscore report		Attendance: 0

4 April 2021	Worcester Wolves	85–93(OT)	London Lions	Worcester Arena, Worcester
15:00	Scoring by quarter: 24–25, 22–20, 15–21, 15–10, Overtime: 9–17
YouTube		boxscore report		Attendance: 0

4 April 2021	Glasgow Rocks	79–87	Bristol Flyers	Emirates Arena, Glasgow
15:00	Scoring by quarter: 11–24, 23–26, 31–16, 14–21
BBL TV		boxscore report		Attendance: 4

4 April 2021	Manchester Giants	87–90	Leicester Riders	National Basketball Performance Centre, Manchester
17:00	Scoring by quarter: 20–26, 21–18, 20–24, 26–22
BBL TV		boxscore report		Attendance: 0

=== Round 19 ===
7 April 2021	London Lions	110–73	Glasgow Rocks	Copper Box Arena, London
18:00	Scoring by quarter: 25–21, 26–16, 32–15, 27–21
BBL TV		boxscore report		Attendance: 0

7 April 2021	Worcester Wolves	57–75	Leicester Riders	Worcester Arena, Worcester
19:00	Scoring by quarter: 21–13, 13–27, 12–15, 11–20
YouTube		boxscore report		Attendance: 346

7 April 2021	Plymouth Raiders	74–65	Bristol Flyers	Plymouth Pavilions, Plymouth
19:30	Scoring by quarter: 14–14, 16–21, 21–20, 23–10
BBL TV		boxscore report		Attendance: 0

9 April 2021	Sheffield Sharks	88–59	Surrey Scorchers	Ponds Forge, Sheffield
18:00	Scoring by quarter: 28–18, 16–7, 22–13, 22–21
BBL TV		boxscore report		Attendance: 0

9 April 2021	Newcastle Eagles	91–95	Manchester Giants	Vertu Motors Arena, Newcastle
18:00	Scoring by quarter: 22–21, 24–11, 29–28, 16–35
BBL TV		boxscore report		Attendance: 0

9 April 2021	Worcester Wolves	83–76	Cheshire Phoenix	Worcester Arena, Worcester
19:00	Scoring by quarter: 18–16, 14–19, 24–24, 27–17
YouTube		boxscore report		Attendance: 0

10 April 2021	Leicester Riders	93–85(OT)	Plymouth Raiders	Morningside Arena, Leicester
18:00	Scoring by quarter: 23–20, 18–16, 15–16, 20–24, Overtime: 17–9
BBL TV		boxscore report		Attendance: 0

10 April 2021	Bristol Flyers	73–84	London Lions	SGS College Arena, Bristol
19:30	Scoring by quarter: 19–26, 13–23, 14–16, 27–19
Flyers TV		boxscore report		Attendance: 10

11 April 2021	Surrey Scorchers	85–75	Worcester Wolves	Surrey Sports Park, Guildford
14:00	Scoring by quarter: 23–22, 21–15, 17–26, 24–12
BBL TV		boxscore report		Attendance: 0

11 April 2021	Glasgow Rocks	77–84	Cheshire Phoenix	Emirates Arena, Glasgow
15:30	Scoring by quarter: 20–15, 22–19, 20–31, 15–19
BBL TV		boxscore report		Attendance: 0

11 April 2021	Manchester Giants	77–58	Sheffield Sharks	National Basketball Performance Centre, Manchester
19:00	Scoring by quarter: 20–16, 16–14, 18–17, 23–11
BBL TV		boxscore report		Attendance: 0

=== Round 20 ===
14 April 2021	London Lions	87–61	Cheshire Phoenix	Copper Box Arena, London
18:00	Scoring by quarter: 22–15, 25–15, 13–22, 27–9
BBL TV		boxscore report		Attendance: 3

14 April 2021	Plymouth Raiders	106–82	Surrey Scorchers	Plymouth Pavilions, Plymouth
19:30	Scoring by quarter: 24–15, 24–23, 32–23, 26–21
BBL TV		boxscore report		Attendance: 0

16 April 2021	London Lions	92–84	Surrey Scorchers	Copper Box Arena, London
18:00	Scoring by quarter: 21–28, 24–16, 18–23, 29–17
BBL TV		boxscore report		Attendance: 0

16 April 2021	Bristol Flyers	91–96(OT)	Sheffield Sharks	SGS College Arena, Bristol
19:30	Scoring by quarter: 19–24, 17–20, 22–19, 22–17, Overtime: 11–16
Flyers TV		boxscore report		Attendance: 0

16 April 2021	Glasgow Rocks	83–101	Manchester Giants	Emirates Arena, Glasgow
19:30	Scoring by quarter: 28–21, 22–26, 14–30, 19–24
BBL TV		boxscore report		Attendance: 0

16 April 2021	Newcastle Eagles	90–80	Leicester Riders	Vertu Motors Arena, Newcastle
19:30	Scoring by quarter: 14–23, 17–19, 32–17, 27–21
Sky Sports		boxscore report		Attendance: 0

18 April 2021	Surrey Scorchers	77–73	Manchester Giants	Surrey Sports Park, Guildford
14:00	Scoring by quarter: 15–16, 11–17, 27–23, 24–17
BBL TV		boxscore report		Attendance: 0

18 April 2021	London Lions	85–74	Bristol Flyers	Copper Box Arena, London
14:30	Scoring by quarter: 16–19, 24–20, 26–16, 19–19
BBL TV		boxscore report		Attendance: 0

18 April 2021	Glasgow Rocks	83–85	Newcastle Eagles	Emirates Arena, Glasgow
15:00	Scoring by quarter: 15–28, 32–16, 15–21, 21–20
BBL TV		boxscore report		Attendance: 0

18 April 2021	Sheffield Sharks	91–88(2OT)	Worcester Wolves	Ponds Forge, Sheffield
15:00	Scoring by quarter: 20–20, 11–14, 12–14, 26–21, Overtime: 11–11, 11–8
BBL TV		boxscore report		Attendance: 0

18 April 2021	Cheshire Phoenix	69–86	Plymouth Raiders	Cheshire Oaks Arena, Ellesmere Port
17:00	Scoring by quarter: 14–18, 17–28, 18–20, 20–20
BBL TV		boxscore report		Attendance: 0

=== Round 21 ===
21 April 2021	London Lions	86–81	Leicester Riders	Copper Box Arena, London
18:00	Scoring by quarter: 25–21, 17–15, 24–14, 20–31
BBL TV		boxscore report		Attendance: 0

22 April 2021	Cheshire Phoenix	85–69	Glasgow Rocks	Cheshire Oaks Arena, Ellesmere Port
18:00	Scoring by quarter: 26–14, 21–21, 26–14, 12–20
BBL TV		boxscore report		Attendance: 0

23 April 2021	Surrey Scorchers	78–86	Sheffield Sharks	Surrey Sports Park, Guildford
18:00	Scoring by quarter: 15–18, 29–16, 15–23, 19–29
BBL TV		boxscore report		Attendance: 0

23 April 2021	Worcester Wolves	92–87	Newcastle Eagles	Worcester Arena, Worcester
19:00	Scoring by quarter: 24–26, 16–20, 26–18, 26–23
YouTube		boxscore report		Attendance: 16

23 April 2021	Bristol Flyers	75–96	Plymouth Raiders	SGS College Arena, Bristol
19:30	Scoring by quarter: 24–32, 23–32, 14–17, 14–15
Flyers TV		boxscore report		Attendance: 10

23 April 2021	Leicester Riders	93–67	Glasgow Rocks	Morningside Arena, Leicester
19:30	Scoring by quarter: 34–13, 17–29, 10–12, 32–13
Sky Sports		boxscore report		Attendance: 0

25 April 2021	Glasgow Rocks	68–73	London Lions	Emirates Arena, Glasgow
15:00	Scoring by quarter: 19–19, 11–18, 13–21, 25–15
BBL TV		boxscore report		Attendance: 0

25 April 2021	Plymouth Raiders	79–76	Sheffield Sharks	Plymouth Pavilions, Plymouth
15:00	Scoring by quarter: 16–12, 21–18, 25–21, 17–25
BBL TV		boxscore report		Attendance: 0

25 April 2021	Cheshire Phoenix	65–97	Leicester Riders	Cheshire Oaks Arena, Ellesmere Port
17:00	Scoring by quarter: 15–25, 18–24, 16–22, 16–26
BBL TV		boxscore report		Attendance: 0

25 April 2021	Manchester Giants	81–83	Bristol Flyers	National Basketball Performance Centre, Manchester
17:00	Scoring by quarter: 26–24, 16–19, 20–16, 19–24
BBL TV		boxscore report		Attendance: 0

25 April 2021	Newcastle Eagles	87–82	Surrey Scorchers	Vertu Motors Arena, Newcastle
17:00	Scoring by quarter: 26–19, 22–22, 22–16, 17–25
BBL TV		boxscore report		Attendance: 0

=== Round 22 ===
28 April 2021	Manchester Giants	86–96	London Lions	National Basketball Performance Centre, Manchester
19:30	Scoring by quarter: 26–30, 27–20, 16–31, 17–15
BBL TV		boxscore report		Attendance: 0

29 April 2021	Bristol Flyers	86–73	Newcastle Eagles	SGS College Arena, Bristol
19:00	Scoring by quarter: 16–17, 18–17, 26–26, 26–13
Flyers TV		boxscore report		Attendance: 0

30 April 2021	Surrey Scorchers	97–100	Plymouth Raiders	Surrey Sports Park, Guildford
18:00	Scoring by quarter: 33–20, 21–26, 22–32, 21–22
BBL TV		boxscore report		Attendance: 0

30 April 2021	Sheffield Sharks	68–80	London Lions	Ponds Forge, Sheffield
18:00	Scoring by quarter: 23–26, 13–21, 14–17, 18–16
BBL TV		boxscore report		Attendance: 0

== Notes ==
Preceded by 2019–20 season	BBL seasons 2020–21	Succeeded by 2021–22 season
