= 2021–22 British Basketball League season =

35th season of the British Basketball League

2021–22 BBL season
- League: British Basketball League
- Season: 2021–22
- Dates: 24 September 2021 – 24 April 2022; 28 April – 15 May 2022 (playoffs)
- Games played: 135
- Teams: 10
- TV partner(s): Great Britain: Sky Sports; BBC Sport; Online: BBL Player; YouTube

Regular season
- League champions: Leicester Riders (6th title)
- BBL Cup: Leicester Riders (3rd title)
- BBL Trophy: Cheshire Phoenix (5th title)
- Season MVP: (United States) Geno Crandall (Leicester)

Playoffs
- Champions: Leicester Riders (6th title)
- Runners-up: London Lions
- Finals MVP: (United States) Geno Crandall (Leicester)

Statistical leaders
Points	(United States) Isaiah Reese (London)	19.3
Rebounds	(United Kingdom) Michael Ochereobia (Cheshire)	7.9
Assists	(United States) Rahmon Fletcher (Newcastle)	10.6
Efficiency	(United States) Darien Nelson-Henry (Leicester)	64%

BBL seasons
- ← 2020–21 2022–23 →

The 2021–22 BBL season was the 35th season of the British Basketball League, the top British professional basketball league, since its establishment in 1987. The season featured 10 teams from across England and Scotland.

== Teams ==
Locations of the 2021–22 BBL teams

=== Arenas and locations ===
Team	Location	Arena	Capacity
Bristol Flyers	Bristol	SGS College Arena	750
Cheshire Phoenix	Ellesmere Port	Cheshire Oaks Arena	1,400
Glasgow Rocks	Glasgow	Emirates Arena	1,650
Leicester Riders	Leicester	Morningside Arena	2,400
London Lions	London	Copper Box Arena	6,000
Manchester Giants	Manchester	National Basketball Centre	2,000
Newcastle Eagles	Newcastle upon Tyne	Vertu Motors Arena	3,000
Plymouth City Patriots	Plymouth	Plymouth Pavilions	1,500
Sheffield Sharks	Sheffield	Ponds Forge	1,000
Surrey Scorchers	Guildford	Surrey Sports Park	1,000

- On 23 June 2021, the owners of the Worcester Wolves withdrew their team from the BBL, citing financial issues arising from the COVID-19 pandemic as one of the main reasons for the decision.
- On 8 July 2021, Plymouth Raiders withdrew from the league due to an increase in the cost of rent at their home venue, the Plymouth Pavilions.
- On 30 July 2021, it was announced by the league that the city of Plymouth would have a franchise for the 2021–22 season.
- On 9 August 2021, Plymouth City Patriots were announced to join the British Basketball League for the 2021–22 season, led by local businessman Carl Heslop. The new organisation could not secure the transfer of the naming and branding rights of the Plymouth Raiders from Plymouth Raiders 1983 Ltd, the previous owners. The Patriots played their home games at the Plymouth Pavilions for one season only.

=== Personnel and sponsorship ===
Team	Head coach	Captain	Main jersey sponsor
Bristol Flyers	(Greece) Andreas Kapoulas	(England) Josh Rogers	Xledger
Cheshire Phoenix	(England) Ben Thomas	(England) Teddy Okereafor	RentASpace
Glasgow Rocks	(Scotland) Gareth Murray	(Scotland) Jonny Bunyan	Glen Luss
Leicester Riders	(United States) Rob Paternostro	(United States) Darien Nelson-Henry	Jelson Homes
London Lions	(England) Nikhil Lawry	(England) Justin Robinson	
Manchester Giants	(England) Lloyd Gardner	(England) Dan Clark	
Newcastle Eagles	(England) Ian McLeod	(United States) Rahmon Fletcher	GiveToLocal
Plymouth City Patriots	(England) Paul James	(Albania) Elvisi Dusha	
Sheffield Sharks	(United States) Atiba Lyons	(Canada) Mike Tuck	B. Braun
Surrey Scorchers	(Zimbabwe) Creon Raftopoulos	(England) Tayo Ogedengbe	Gidden Place

=== Coaching changes ===
Team	Outgoing coach	Manner of departure	Date of vacancy	Position in table	Incoming coach	Date of appointment
Plymouth City Patriots	New team			Pre-season	(England) Paul James	10 August 2021
London Lions	(England) Vince Macaulay	Released	19 January 2022	8th (3–2)	(England) James Vear	19 January 2022
London Lions	(England) James Vear	Personal reasons	30 March 2022	5th (10–7)	(England) Nikhil Lawry	30 March 2022

== BBL Cup ==
The 2021–22 BBL Cup featured all 10 teams, split into 2 geographical groups, North and South. Each team played each other twice (once home, once away) with the top 4 teams in each group progressing to the quarter-finals. Single-legged quarter-finals and two-legged semi-finals matches determined the two finalists who contested the Cup final at Arena Birmingham.

=== Qualification Stage ===
==== North Group ====
Pos	Team	Pld	W	L	PF	PA	PD	Pts	Qualification
1	Manchester Giants	8	6	2	711	634	+77	12	Quarter-finals
2	Glasgow Rocks	8	5	3	690	663	+27	10	Quarter-finals
3	Cheshire Phoenix	8	4	4	639	666	−27	8	Quarter-finals
4	Sheffield Sharks	8	4	4	622	618	+4	8	Quarter-finals
5	Newcastle Eagles	8	1	7	639	720	−81	2	

Updated to match(es) played on 24 October 2021. Source: BBC Sport

24 September 2021	Newcastle Eagles	72–82	Glasgow Rocks	Vertu Motors Arena, Newcastle
19:30	Scoring by quarter: 18–23, 18–16, 15–25, 21–18
BBL Player		boxscore report		Attendance: 2,500

24 September 2021	Sheffield Sharks	64–71	Cheshire Phoenix	Ponds Forge, Sheffield
19:30	Scoring by quarter: 12–22, 27–11, 16–16, 9–22
BBL Player		boxscore report		Attendance: not available

26 September 2021	Glasgow Rocks	69–79	Sheffield Sharks	Emirates Arena, Glasgow
16:30	Scoring by quarter: 18–16, 18–22, 17–18, 16–23
BBL Player		boxscore report		Attendance: not available

26 September 2021	Cheshire Phoenix	72–78(OT)	Manchester Giants	Cheshire Oaks Arena, Ellesmere Port
17:30	Scoring by quarter: 19–17, 15–15, 11–15, 20–18, Overtime: 7–13
BBL Player		boxscore report		Attendance: 600

1 October 2021	Glasgow Rocks	107–82	Manchester Giants	Emirates Arena, Glasgow
19:30	Scoring by quarter: 27–17, 21–23, 23–17, 36–25
BBL Player		boxscore report		Attendance: 400

1 October 2021	Newcastle Eagles	82–85	Sheffield Sharks	Vertu Motors Arena, Newcastle
19:30	Scoring by quarter: 19–21, 20–28, 25–16, 18–20
BBL Player		boxscore report		Attendance: 2,200

3 October 2021	Manchester Giants	92–86	Newcastle Eagles	National Basketball Centre, Manchester
17:00	Scoring by quarter: 16–22, 27–29, 27–17, 22–18
BBL Player		boxscore report		Attendance: 500

3 October 2021	Cheshire Phoenix	84–77	Glasgow Rocks	Cheshire Oaks Arena, Ellesmere Port
17:30	Scoring by quarter: 24–15, 21–25, 21–21, 18–16
BBL Player		boxscore report		Attendance: 638

8 October 2021	Sheffield Sharks	68–85	Manchester Giants	Ponds Forge, Sheffield
19:30	Scoring by quarter: 18–16, 20–23, 12–25, 18–21
BBL Player		boxscore report		Attendance: 200

8 October 2021	Newcastle Eagles	94–74	Cheshire Phoenix	Vertu Motors Arena, Newcastle
19:30	Scoring by quarter: 27–14, 18–18, 18–23, 31–19
BBL Player		boxscore report		Attendance: 2,100

10 October 2021	Manchester Giants	83–90	Glasgow Rocks	National Basketball Centre, Manchester
17:00	Scoring by quarter: 20–21, 24–26, 20–20, 19–23
BBL Player		boxscore report		Attendance: 100

10 October 2021	Cheshire Phoenix	85–78	Sheffield Sharks	Cheshire Oaks Arena, Ellesmere Port
17:30	Scoring by quarter: 14–21, 14–13, 26–23, 31–21
BBL Player		boxscore report		Attendance: not available

15 October 2021	Sheffield Sharks	85–64	Newcastle Eagles	Ponds Forge, Sheffield
19:30	Scoring by quarter: 19–15, 18–16, 25–24, 23–9
BBL Player		boxscore report		Attendance: not available

15 October 2021	Manchester Giants	91–61	Cheshire Phoenix	National Basketball Centre, Manchester
19:30	Scoring by quarter: 16–21, 31–12, 25–11, 19–17
BBL Player		boxscore report		Attendance: not available

17 October 2021	Glasgow Rocks	92–84	Newcastle Eagles	Emirates Arena, Glasgow
18:00	Scoring by quarter: 25–28, 31–13, 14–28, 22–15
BBL Player		boxscore report		Attendance: 400

19 October 2021	Manchester Giants	89–77	Sheffield Sharks	National Basketball Centre, Manchester
19:00	Scoring by quarter: 17–17, 18–24, 24–14, 30–22
BBL Player		boxscore report		Attendance: 300

22 October 2021	Glasgow Rocks	100–93	Cheshire Phoenix	Emirates Arena, Glasgow
19:30	Scoring by quarter: 19–18, 25–30, 25–23, 31–22
BBL Player		boxscore report		Attendance: 200

22 October 2021	Newcastle Eagles	73–111	Manchester Giants	Vertu Motors Arena, Newcastle
19:30	Scoring by quarter: 20–30, 16–25, 17–26, 20–30
BBL Player		boxscore report		Attendance: 2,800

24 October 2021	Sheffield Sharks	86–73	Glasgow Rocks	Ponds Forge, Sheffield
16:00	Scoring by quarter: 22–17, 14–20, 25–14, 25–22
BBL Player		boxscore report		Attendance: 150

24 October 2021	Cheshire Phoenix	99–84	Newcastle Eagles	Cheshire Oaks Arena, Ellesmere Port
17:30	Scoring by quarter: 23–14, 25–16, 31–29, 20–25
BBL Player		boxscore report		Attendance: 808

==== South Group ====
Pos	Team	Pld	W	L	PF	PA	PD	Pts	Qualification
1	London Lions	8	7	1	722	622	+100	14	Quarter-finals
2	Leicester Riders	8	6	2	715	616	+99	12	Quarter-finals
3	Bristol Flyers	8	4	4	649	653	−4	8	Quarter-finals
4	Surrey Scorchers	8	3	5	639	654	−15	6	Quarter-finals
5	Plymouth City Patriots	8	0	8	513	693	−180	0	

Updated to match(es) played on 7 November 2021. Source: BBC Sport

24 September 2021	Surrey Scorchers	85–86	London Lions	Surrey Sports Park, Guildford
19:30	Scoring by quarter: 20–20, 22–21, 29–21, 14–24
BBL Player		boxscore report		Attendance: 250

24 September 2021	Leicester Riders	84–85	Bristol Flyers	Morningside Arena, Leicester
20:00	Scoring by quarter: 23–14, 19–25, 26–24, 16–22
BBL Player		boxscore report		Attendance: 1,000

25 September 2021	Bristol Flyers	84–75	Plymouth City Patriots	SGS College Arena, Bristol
19:30	Scoring by quarter: 32–30, 25–12, 10–18, 17–15
BBL Player		boxscore report		Attendance: 350

26 September 2021	London Lions	90–61	Plymouth City Patriots	Copper Box Arena, London
16:00	Scoring by quarter: 23–14, 23–14, 18–20, 26–13
BBL Player		boxscore report		Attendance: 700

26 September 2021	Leicester Riders	96–80	Surrey Scorchers	Morningside Arena, Leicester
16:00	Scoring by quarter: 34–24, 22–21, 30–20, 10–15
BBL Player		boxscore report		Attendance: 100

2 October 2021	Surrey Scorchers	65–57	Plymouth City Patriots	Surrey Sports Park, Guildford
18:00	Scoring by quarter: 20–17, 22–18, 8–15, 15–7
BBL Player		boxscore report		Attendance: 400

2 October 2021	Bristol Flyers	80–90	London Lions	SGS College Arena, Bristol
19:30	Scoring by quarter: 16–25, 15–28, 22–15, 27–22
BBL Player		boxscore report		Attendance: not available

8 October 2021	Bristol Flyers	67–75	Leicester Riders	SGS College Arena, Bristol
19:30	Scoring by quarter: 16–20, 20–19, 19–21, 12–15
BBL Player		boxscore report		Attendance: 385

8 October 2021	London Lions	88–73	Surrey Scorchers	Copper Box Arena, London
19:30	Scoring by quarter: 29–14, 23–15, 11–21, 25–23
BBL Player		boxscore report		Attendance: not available

10 October 2021	Plymouth City Patriots	58–109	Leicester Riders	Plymouth Pavilions, Plymouth
15:00	Scoring by quarter: 15–26, 15–29, 12–26, 16–28
BBL Player		boxscore report		Attendance: not available

10 October 2021	London Lions	94–85	Bristol Flyers	Copper Box Arena, London
16:00	Scoring by quarter: 19–22, 15–23, 29–16, 31–24
BBL Player		boxscore report		Attendance: 400

16 October 2021	Surrey Scorchers	89–94	Leicester Riders	Surrey Sports Park, Guildford
18:00	Scoring by quarter: 17–16, 20–32, 27–25, 25–21
BBL Player		boxscore report		Attendance: 300

17 October 2021	Plymouth City Patriots	62–101	London Lions	Plymouth Pavilions, Plymouth
15:00	Scoring by quarter: 16–30, 16–20, 16–27, 14–24
BBL Player		boxscore report		Attendance: not available

20 October 2021	Plymouth City Patriots	69–82	Bristol Flyers	Plymouth Pavilions, Plymouth
19:00	Scoring by quarter: 14–13, 16–17, 17–24, 22–28
BBL Player		boxscore report		Attendance: 250

22 October 2021	Leicester Riders	93–76	London Lions	Morningside Arena, Leicester
20:00	Scoring by quarter: 20–14, 19–28, 29–22, 25–12
BBL Player		boxscore report		Attendance: not available

23 October 2021	Bristol Flyers	81–82	Surrey Scorchers	SGS College Arena, Bristol
19:30	Scoring by quarter: 26–22, 17–11, 22–24, 16–25
BBL Player		boxscore report		Attendance: not available

24 October 2021	Leicester Riders	81–64	Plymouth City Patriots	Morningside Arena, Leicester
16:00	Scoring by quarter: 24–18, 16–9, 24–24, 17–13
BBL Player		boxscore report		Attendance: not available

27 October 2021	Plymouth City Patriots	67–81	Surrey Scorchers	Plymouth Pavilions, Plymouth
19:00	Scoring by quarter: 18–22, 20–29, 15–20, 14–10
BBL Player		boxscore report		Attendance: not available

30 October 2021	Surrey Scorchers	84–85	Bristol Flyers	Surrey Sports Park, Guildford
18:00	Scoring by quarter: 17–24, 17–17, 24–24, 26–20
BBL Player		boxscore report		Attendance: 400

7 November 2021	Leicester Riders	83–97	London Lions	Morningside Arena, Leicester
16:00	Scoring by quarter: 25–28, 22–31, 19–14, 17–24
BBL Player		boxscore report		Attendance: 666

=== Quarter-finals ===
13 November 2021	London Lions	100–68	Sheffield Sharks	Copper Box Arena, London
17:00	Scoring by quarter: 22–16, 24–18, 27–9, 27–25
BBL Player		boxscore report		Attendance: 500

13 November 2021	Leicester Riders	85–84	Cheshire Phoenix	Morningside Arena, Leicester
19:30	Scoring by quarter: 21–28, 23–16, 15–20, 26–20
BBL Player		boxscore report		Attendance: 666

14 November 2021	Glasgow Rocks	95–90(OT)	Bristol Flyers	Emirates Arena, Glasgow
17:00	Scoring by quarter: 20–24, 23–18, 21–21, 22–23, Overtime: 9–4
BBL Player		boxscore report		Attendance: 100

14 November 2021	Manchester Giants	95–92	Surrey Scorchers	National Basketball Centre, Manchester
17:00	Scoring by quarter: 27–30, 25–17, 16–18, 27–27
BBL Player		boxscore report		Attendance: 100

=== Semi-finals ===
10 December 2021	London Lions	96–99 (Series: Leicester leads, 99–96 on aggregate)	Leicester Riders	Copper Box Arena, London
19:30	Scoring by quarter: 25–31, 23–24, 21–33, 27–11
BBL Player		boxscore report		Attendance: not available

30 December 2021	Leicester Riders	79–74 (Series: Leicester wins, 178–170 on aggregate)	London Lions	Morningside Arena, Leicester
20:00	Scoring by quarter: 26–20, 26–14, 15–23, 12–17
BBL Player		boxscore report		Attendance: 666

12 December 2021	Glasgow Rocks	102–92 (Series: Glasgow leads, 102–92 on aggregate)	Manchester Giants	Emirates Arena, Glasgow
18:30	Scoring by quarter: 25–19, 23–30, 29–21, 25–22
BBL Player		boxscore report		Attendance: 250

15 December 2021	Manchester Giants	92–79 (Series: Manchester wins, 184–181 on aggregate)	Glasgow Rocks	National Basketball Centre, Manchester
19:30	Scoring by quarter: 27–21, 25–22, 17–26, 23–10
BBL Player		boxscore report		Attendance: not available

=== Cup final ===
30 January 2022	Leicester Riders	83–69	Manchester Giants	Utilita Arena Birmingham, Birmingham
15:30	Scoring by quarter: 15–20, 30–8, 15–23, 23–18
Sky Sports	Pts: Crandall 26; Rebs: Walker 7 Asts: Crandall 5	boxscore report	Pts: Armstrong 18; Rebs: Clark 12; Asts: Armstrong 4	Attendance: 2,000

== BBL Championship ==
The BBL Championship retained the three-game series format from the previous season, for a 27-game regular season, played across 24 Rounds between 29 October 2021 to 24 April 2022.

On 6 April 2022, Leicester Riders were crowned league champions and won their 6th BBL Championship title.

=== Standings ===
Pos	Team	Pld	W	L	PF	PA	PD	Pts	Qualification
1	Leicester Riders (C)	27	25	2	2458	1934	+524	50	Playoffs
2	Sheffield Sharks	27	17	10	2054	2005	+49	34	Playoffs
3	London Lions	27	16	11	2276	2165	+111	32	Playoffs
4	Bristol Flyers	27	14	13	2185	2097	+88	28	Playoffs
5	Manchester Giants	27	14	13	2351	2309	+42	28	Playoffs
6	Cheshire Phoenix	27	13	14	2272	2280	−8	26	Playoffs
7	Glasgow Rocks	27	12	15	2415	2471	−56	24	Playoffs
8	Plymouth City Patriots	27	12	15	2176	2319	−143	24	Playoffs
9	Newcastle Eagles	27	10	17	2313	2422	−109	20	
10	Surrey Scorchers	27	2	25	1959	2457	−498	4	

Updated to match(es) played on 24 April 2022. Source: BBC Sport
(C) Champions

=== Ladder progression ===
- Numbers highlighted in green indicate that the team finished the round inside the top eight.
- Numbers highlighted in blue indicates the team finished first on the ladder in that round.
- Numbers highlighted in red indicates the team finished last place on the ladder in that round.

2021–22 BBL Championship
Team	1	2	3	4	5	6	7	8	9	10	11	12	13	14	15	16	17	18	19	20	21	22	23	24
Bristol Flyers	–	6	6	7	7	6	4	4	4	5	3	3	5	7	7	8	8	7	7	7	8	8	5	4
Cheshire Phoenix	4	10	10	8	8	8	8	8	8	4	6	5	4	4	2	2	3	4	4	4	5	5	6	6
Glasgow Rocks	–	8	8	4	5	7	7	5	5	6	8	8	8	9	9	9	9	9	9	9	6	6	7	7
Leicester Riders	2	5	5	3	1	1	1	1	1	1	1	1	1	1	1	1	1	1	1	1	1	1	1	1
London Lions	–	4	4	2	4	5	6	7	7	8	7	6	6	6	6	6	5	5	5	5	2	4	4	3
Manchester Giants	3	3	1	1	2	4	3	3	2	2	2	2	2	3	4	4	4	2	2	2	3	3	3	5
Newcastle Eagles	5	2	3	5	6	3	5	6	6	7	5	7	7	5	5	5	6	8	8	8	9	9	9	9
Plymouth City Patriots	–	9	9	10	9	9	10	10	10	9	9	9	9	8	8	7	7	6	6	6	7	7	8	8
Sheffield Sharks	1	1	2	6	3	2	2	2	3	3	4	4	3	2	3	3	2	3	3	3	4	2	2	2
Surrey Scorchers	–	7	7	9	10	10	9	9	9	10	10	10	10	10	10	10	10	10	10	10	10	10	10	10

== BBL Trophy ==
The BBL Trophy retained the same, 16-team bracket format as introduced for the 2018–19 season. The ten BBL teams were joined in the first round draw by six invited teams; Solent Kestrels, Derby Trailblazers, Thames Valley Cavaliers and Hemel Storm, from the English Basketball League. Falkirk Fury from the Scottish Basketball Championship and Basketball Wales are the only additional teams outside of England.

=== First round ===
7 January 2022	Bristol Flyers	71–68	Leicester Riders	SGS College Arena, Bristol
19:30	Scoring by quarter: 16–10, 22–24, 21–10, 12–24
YouTube		boxscore report		Attendance: 770

7 January 2022	Surrey Scorchers	93–98	Derby Trailblazers	Surrey Sports Park, Guildford
19:30	Scoring by quarter: 27–32, 17–28, 18–18, 31–20
YouTube		boxscore report		Attendance: 700

7 January 2022	Glasgow Rocks	91–82	Solent Kestrels	Emirates Arena, Glasgow
19:30	Scoring by quarter: 22–15, 25–22, 14–14, 30–31
YouTube		boxscore report		Attendance: 100

9 January 2022	Plymouth City Patriots	113–66	Basketball Wales	Plymouth Pavilions, Plymouth
15:00	Scoring by quarter: 34–18, 36–11, 29–16, 14–21
BBL Player		boxscore report		Attendance: not available

9 January 2022	Sheffield Sharks	77–90	Manchester Giants	Ponds Forge, Sheffield
16:00	Scoring by quarter: 20–21, 27–30, 10–21, 20–18
BBL Player		boxscore report		Attendance: 500

9 January 2022	Cheshire Phoenix	123–64	Falkirk Fury	Cheshire Oaks Arena, Ellesmere Port
17:30	Scoring by quarter: 30–20, 28–11, 38–16, 27–17
BBL Player		boxscore report		Attendance: 600

14 January 2022	Newcastle Eagles	70–84	London Lions	Vertu Motors Arena, Newcastle
19:30	Scoring by quarter: 11–36, 24–14, 17–22, 18–12
BBL Player		boxscore report		Attendance: 2,400

30 January 2022	Thames Valley Cavaliers	86–78	Hemel Storm	Uxbridge College, West London
16:30	Scoring by quarter: 21–13, 20–26, 18–22, 27–17
BBL Player		boxscore report		Attendance: 100

=== Quarter-finals ===
26 January 2022	Plymouth City Patriots	77–88	Cheshire Phoenix	Plymouth Pavilions, Plymouth
19:00	Scoring by quarter: 15–22, 17–30, 19–19, 26–17
BBL Player		boxscore report		Attendance: not available

4 February 2022	Derby Trailblazers	70–90	Bristol Flyers	Clarence Wiggins Sports Centre, Derby
19:30	Scoring by quarter: 23–21, 18–20, 17–19, 12–30
BBL Player		boxscore report		Attendance: not available

4 February 2022	Thames Valley Cavaliers	91–97(OT)	Glasgow Rocks	Uxbridge College, West London
19:30	Scoring by quarter: 16–21, 14–20, 23–22, 29–19, Overtime: 9–15
BBL Player		boxscore report		Attendance: 60

6 February 2022	Manchester Giants	79–90	London Lions	National Basketball Centre, Manchester
17:00	Scoring by quarter: 14–28, 15–26, 25–19, 25–17
BBL Player		boxscore report		Attendance: 1,000

=== Semi-finals ===
==== Bristol Flyers v London Lions ====
19 February 2022	Bristol Flyers	61–81 (Series: London leads, 81–61 on aggregate)	London Lions	SGS College Arena, Bristol
19:30	Scoring by quarter: 17–22, 16–17, 14–15, 14–27
BBL Player		boxscore report		Attendance: not available

9 March 2022	London Lions	85–81 (Series: London wins, 166–142 on aggregate)	Bristol Flyers	Copper Box Arena, London
19:30	Scoring by quarter: 19–21, 23–15, 24–27, 19–18
BBL Player		boxscore report		Attendance: 500

==== Glasgow Rocks v Cheshire Phoenix ====
2 March 2022	Glasgow Rocks	102–90 (Series: Glasgow leads, 102–90 on aggregate)	Cheshire Phoenix	Emirates Arenaa, Glasgow
19:30	Scoring by quarter: 27–20, 27–23, 26–22, 22–25
BBL Player		boxscore report		Attendance: 200

6 March 2022	Cheshire Phoenix	115–72 (Series: Cheshire wins, 205–174 on aggregate)	Glasgow Rocks	Cheshire Oaks Arena, Ellesmere Port
17:30	Scoring by quarter: 19–19, 27–19, 34–16, 35–18
BBL Player		boxscore report		Attendance: 1,000

=== Trophy final ===
20 March 2022	London Lions	68–82	Cheshire Phoenix	Emirates Arena, Glasgow
15:30	Scoring by quarter: 16–22, 19–18, 20–21, 13–21
Sky Sports	Pts: D.Williams 24; Rebs: Tawiah 6 Asts: Kaboza, Robinson 5	boxscore report	Pts: Austin 23; Rebs: Austin 10; Asts: Okereafor 5	Attendance: 5,900

== Playoffs ==
The BBL Playoffs returned to the two-legged aggregate series format used prior to the 2020–21 season. The BBL Playoff Final was played at The O2 Arena, London for the sixth time and saw Leicester Riders defeat London Lions.

=== Bracket ===
Quarter-finals
1	Leicester Riders	86	88	174
8	Plymouth City Patriots	71	87	158
2	Sheffield Sharks	83	72	155
7	Glasgow Rocks	76	96	172
3	London Lions	85	95	180
6	Cheshire Phoenix	69	97	166
4	Bristol Flyers	79	94	173
5	Manchester Giants	91	80	171

Semi-finals
1	Leicester Riders	105	104	209
7	Glasgow Rocks	84	78	162
3	London Lions	85	91	176
4	Bristol Flyers	83	73	156

Final
1	Leicester Riders	78
3	London Lions	75

=== Quarter-finals ===
==== (1) Leicester Riders vs. (8) Plymouth City Patriots ====
29 April 2022	Plymouth City Patriots	71–86 (Series: Leicester leads, 86–71 on aggregate)	Leicester Riders	Plymouth Pavilions, Plymouth
19:30	Scoring by quarter: 17–12, 19–27, 18–25, 17–22
BBL Player		boxscore report		Attendance: not available

1 May 2022	Leicester Riders	88–87 (Series: Leicester wins, 174–158 on aggregate)	Plymouth City Patriots	Morningside Arena, Leicester
16:00	Scoring by quarter: 23–26, 19–19, 21–18, 25–24
BBL Player		boxscore report		Attendance: 1,000

==== (2) Sheffield Sharks vs. (7) Glasgow Rocks ====
29 April 2022	Glasgow Rocks	76–83 (Series: Sheffield leads, 83–76 on aggregate)	Sheffield Sharks	Emirates Arena, Glasgow
19:30	Scoring by quarter: 16–22, 25–15, 17–23, 18–23
BBL Player		boxscore report		Attendance: 760

1 May 2022	Sheffield Sharks	72–96 (Series: Glasgow wins, 172–155 on aggregate)	Glasgow Rocks	Ponds Forge, Sheffield
16:00	Scoring by quarter: 24–29, 18–25, 23–16, 7–26
Sky Sports		boxscore report		Attendance: 100

==== (3) London Lions vs. (6) Cheshire Phoenix ====
29 April 2022	London Lions	85–69 (Series: London leads, 85–69 on aggregate)	Cheshire Phoenix	Copper Box Arena, London
19:30	Scoring by quarter: 19–23, 20–17, 28–17, 18–12
BBL Player		boxscore report		Attendance: not available

1 May 2022	Cheshire Phoenix	97–95 (Series: London wins, 180–166 on aggregate)	London Lions	Cheshire Oaks Arena, Ellesmere Port
18:30	Scoring by quarter: 32–22, 35–16, 13–27, 17–30
BBL Player		boxscore report		Attendance: 800

==== (4) Bristol Flyers vs. (5) Manchester Giants ====
28 April 2022	Manchester Giants	91–79 (Series: Manchester leads, 91–79 on aggregate)	Bristol Flyers	National Basketball Centre, Manchester
19:30	Scoring by quarter: 26–21, 28–20, 21–20, 16–18
BBL Player		boxscore report		Attendance: 200

30 April 2022	Bristol Flyers	94–80 (Series: Bristol wins, 173–171 on aggregate)	Manchester Giants	SGS College Arena, Bristol
19:30	Scoring by quarter: 26–24, 23–16, 21–20, 24–20
BBL Player		boxscore report		Attendance: not available

=== Semi-finals ===
==== (1) Leicester Riders vs. (7) Glasgow Rocks ====
7 May 2022	Glasgow Rocks	84–105 (Series: Leicester leads, 105–84 on aggregate)	Leicester Riders	Emirates Arena, Glasgow
14:00	Scoring by quarter: 17–25, 31–18, 21–34, 15–28
BBL Player		boxscore report		Attendance: 400

9 May 2022	Leicester Riders	104–78 (Series: Leicester wins, 209–162 on aggregate)	Glasgow Rocks	Morningside Arena, Leicester
19:45	Scoring by quarter: 29–17, 17–21, 26–23, 32–17
BBL Player		boxscore report		Attendance: 666

==== (3) London Lions vs. (4) Bristol Flyers ====
6 May 2022	Bristol Flyers	83–85 (Series: London leads, 85–83 on aggregate)	London Lions	SGS College Arena, Bristol
19:30	Scoring by quarter: 25–15, 14–24, 21–20, 23–26
BBL Player		boxscore report		Attendance: 770

8 May 2022	London Lions	91–73 (Series: London wins, 176–156 on aggregate)	Bristol Flyers	Copper Box Arena, London
17:30	Scoring by quarter: 23–22, 23–20, 14–13, 31–18
BBL Player		boxscore report		Attendance: 1,800

=== Playoff final ===
==== (1) Leicester Riders vs. (3) London Lions ====
15 May 2022	Leicester Riders	78–75	London Lions	The O2 Arena, London
16:15	Scoring by quarter: 23–29, 23–10, 11–26, 21–10
Sky Sports	Pts: Crandall 23; Rebs: Walker 8 Asts: Crandall 5	boxscore report	Pts: Reese 29; Rebs: Tawiah 14; Asts: Reese 7	Attendance: 15,824

== Awards ==
- Most Valuable Player: Geno Crandall (Leicester Riders)
- Play-off Final MVP: Geno Crandall (Leicester Riders)
- Coach of the Year: Rob Paternostro (Leicester Riders)

=== 2021–22 BBL Team of the Year ===
#	Player	Team
PG	Geno Crandall	Leicester Riders
SG	Isaiah Reese	London Lions
SF	Patrick Whelan	Leicester Riders
PF	Daniel Clark	Manchester Giants
C	Darien Nelson-Henry	Leicester Riders

Source: 2021–22 Molten BBL Team of the Year

=== 2021–22 BBL All-British Team of the Year ===
#	Player	Team
PG	Teddy Okereafor	Cheshire Phoenix
SG	Rowell Graham-Bell	Plymouth City Patriots
SF	Patrick Whelan	Leicester Riders
PF	Daniel Clark	Manchester Giants
C	Mike Ochereobia	Cheshire Phoenix

Source: 2021–22 BBL All-British Team of the Year

=== 2021–22 BBL Defensive Team of the Year ===
#	Player	Team
PG	Larry Austin Jr.	Cheshire Phoenix
SG	Jordan Harris	Glasgow Rocks
SF	Julian Washburn	London Lions
PF	Jamell Anderson	Manchester Giants
C	Kylor Kelley	London Lions

Source: 2021–22 BBL Defensive Team of the Year

== British clubs in European competitions ==
Team	Competition	Progress
London Lions	Champions League	First qualifying round
London Lions	FIBA Europe Cup	Second round

Preceded by 2020–21 season	BBL seasons 2021–22	Succeeded by 2022–23 season
