= Dan Watchurst =

Welsh rugby union player (1990)

- Born: Dan Watchurst; 15 March 1990 (age 36) Bristol, England
- Height: 186 cm (6 ft 1 in)
- Weight: 118 kg (18 st 8 lb)
- School: Colston's School; Bristol Cathedral Choir School; South Gloucestershire and Stroud College
- University: UWIC

Rugby union career
- Position: Prop
Senior career
| Years | Team | Apps | (Points) |
| 2009–2013 | NG Dragons | 2 | (0) |
International career
| Years | Team | Apps | (Points) |
| 2008 | Wales U18 | | |
| 2009–2010 | Wales U20 | 14 | (0) |

Dan Watchurst (born 15 March 1990) is a Welsh former rugby union player for Newport RFC and the Newport Gwent Dragons. He captained the Wales under-20 national team.

== Professional career ==
A prop forward, Watchurst previously played for Ebbw Vale RFC, Bedwas RFC, Pontypool RFC and the Newport Gwent Dragons Under-20 regional team. He made his debut for the Newport Gwent Dragons senior team versus Sale Sharks on 6 November 2009.

Watchurst was selected for the 2009 Six Nations Under 20s Championship, but missed the 2009 IRB Junior World Championship due to injury.

On 22 December 2009, he was named in the Wales Under 20 Squad for the 2010 Under-20 Six Nations tournament On 1 February 2010, Watchurst was named as captain for the first two matches of the tournament.

In May 2010, he was named as Wales Under-20 captain for the Junior World Cup in Argentina in June 2010. During the tournament, Watchurst suffered an injury which ruled him out of the beginning of the 2010–11 Celtic League. Watchurst returned to play for Newport RFC, but aggravated his injury on his first match back, against Worcester Warriors.

Watchurst broke his leg while playing for Newport RFC in December 2011.

Watchurst returned from injury to play twice for Cross Keys RFC, but ultimately retired from rugby at the end of the 2012–13 season, having failed to fully recover.
