= Mark Woods (sportswriter) =

Mark Woods is a sports writer and broadcaster, based in Edinburgh, United Kingdom.

His work regularly features in several print and broadcast media outlets in the UK and overseas, in particular on basketball, athletics, cricket and triathlon.

He has been a presenter for BBC Radio 5 Live, BBC Radio Scotland, Premier Sports and Talksport, and commentator on Sky Sports, Eurosport and BBL TV.

He is currently head of marketing and communications at the charity Sported.

== Writing ==
He was editor of MVP Magazine, and contributed to BT Sport, ESPN.com, The Daily Record and The Herald. He is the author of several children's books on sport.

== Awards ==
In 2012, he was the first non-American to be shortlisted in the Professional Basketball Writers Association annual awards.

== Personal life ==
Hailing originally from Belfast, he attended the University of Dundee.
