= BBL Player =

- Country: United Kingdom
- Headquarters: Leicester, England

Programming
- Language: English
- Picture format: 720p (HDTV)

Ownership
- Owner: British Basketball League

History
- Launched: 6 October 2013
- Closed: January 2023
- Replaced by: YouTube (league streaming); Sky Sports (broadcast partner)
- Former names: BBL TV

Links
- Website: https://www.bblplayer.co.uk

BBL Player, formerly known as BBL TV, was a subscription-based internet television service operated by the British Basketball League (BBL). Launched in 2013, the platform provided live and on-demand coverage of BBL fixtures to viewers in the United Kingdom and internationally. The service ceased operations in January 2023 following a strategic shift in the league’s broadcast and digital media approach.

== History ==
The launch of BBL TV was announced on 19 August 2013 following nine months of development. The service debuted during the 2013–14 season, initially broadcasting 30 live games, beginning with Glasgow Rocks versus Surrey United on 6 October 2013 at the Emirates Arena. In addition to live broadcasts, the platform offered an archive library of previously aired games.

The service returned for the 2014–15 season with expanded coverage, including additional live games, enhanced pre- and post-match analysis and interactive features such as an in-play discussion forum. Coverage for the season increased to 45 games following the announcement of Sportradar as the league’s official betting data partner.

In January 2023, the British Basketball League announced that BBL Player would be shut down, with the league moving away from a subscription-based streaming model. Live game coverage was instead shifted to free platforms such as YouTube, while the league pursued a broader broadcast partnership strategy.

Later in 2023, the league secured a broadcast agreement with Sky Sports to televise selected fixtures. However, this arrangement was short-lived, preceding the subsequent collapse of the British Basketball League’s operating structure.

== Presenters and commentators ==
- Daniel Routledge – presenter and commentator
- Vince Macaulay – commentator
- Rob Paternostro – guest commentator
- Mark Woods – courtside reporter

== See also ==
- British Basketball League
