= Cheshire Oaks Arena =

Sports arena in Cheshire, England

Coordinates: 53.266°N 2.893°W

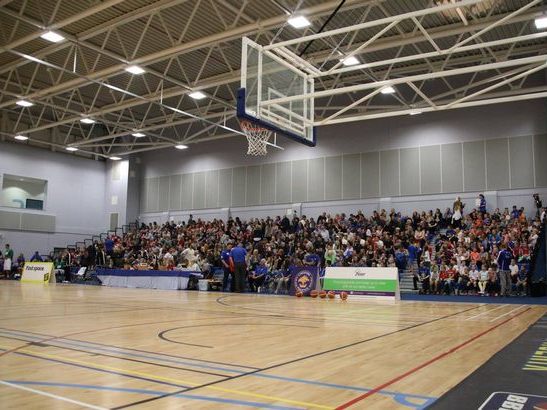
- Cheshire Oaks Arena, home to the Cheshire Phoenix.
- Interactive map of Cheshire Oaks Arena
- Location: Ellesmere Port, England, United Kingdom
- Capacity: Basketball: 1,400

Construction
- Opened: 2015

Tenant
- Cheshire Phoenix (2015-present)

Cheshire Oaks Arena is a sports arena that is located as part of the Ellesmere Port Sports Village, a leisure centre in Ellesmere Port, England. On match days, the hall is converted into the arena with a seating capacity for 1,400 spectators. The arena's main tenants are the Cheshire Phoenix, who moved from their previous home at the Northgate Arena in Chester for the start of the 2015–16 season.

== History ==
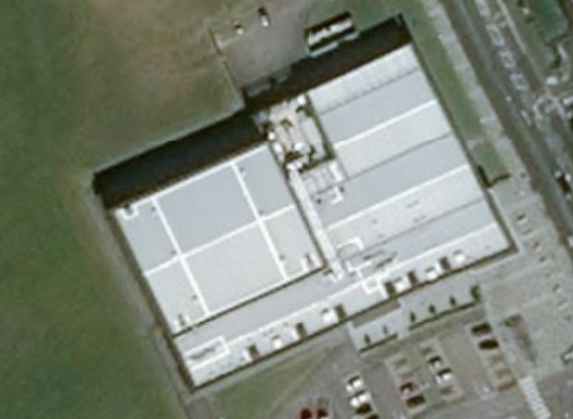
Aerial photo

The £15 million Ellesmere Port Sports Village, which the Cheshire Oaks Arena forms a part of, was officially opened by the Earl of Wessex in May 2015.
