= Vertu Motors Arena =

Events venue in Newcastle, England

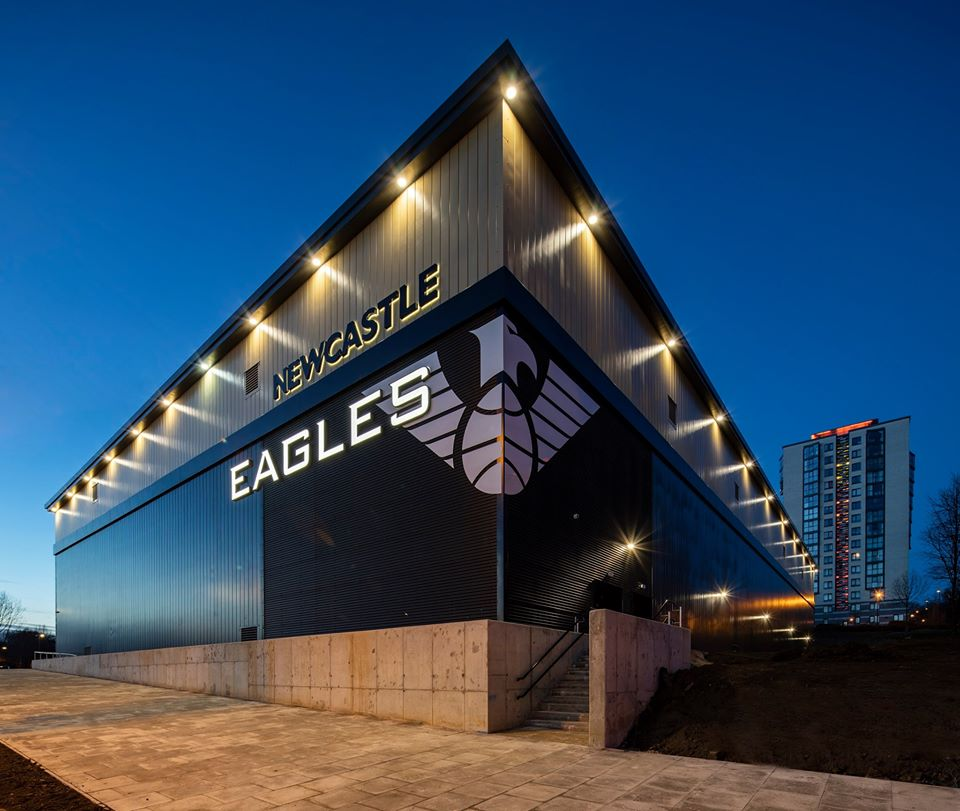
- Home of the Newcastle Eagles
- Interactive map of Vertu Motors Arena
- Former names: Eagles Community Arena
- Location: Newcastle, England
- Coordinates: 54.9637°N 1.6369°W
- Owner: Eagles Community Foundation
- Capacity: Basketball: 2,800; Boxing: 3,500; Entertainment: 3,300

Construction
- Opened: January 2019
- Cost: £6.5 million

Tenant
- Newcastle Eagles (2019–present)

Website
- vertumotorsarena.com

The Vertu Motors Arena (formerly the Eagles Community Arena) is a multi-purpose built venue for events, meetings, sports and the community in the Elswick area of the city of Newcastle, England. The arena has a capacity for up to 3,500 spectators and is home to the Newcastle Eagles of the Super League Basketball and Women's Super League Basketball.

Naming rights to the arena are held by the automotive retailer Vertu, which is based in nearby Team Valley.

== Background ==
It had been a stated aim of Newcastle Eagles owner Paul Blake 'for at least 10 years, probably longer' for the club and its foundation to own and control their own facility. The club had previously been based at the Metro Radio Arena and Northumbria University's Sport Central.

In partnership with Newcastle City Council, the North East Local Enterprise Partnership, Sport England and Newcastle College, planning permission was approved and construction work on the arena began in November 2017. The arena was officially opened in January 2019, when the Eagles hosted the Plymouth Raiders in a BBL Championship match.

The arena was awarded three prizes in special achievement, community value and social accessibility at the 2020 Lord Mayor's Design Awards.

== International basketball matches ==
Date	Competition	Home team	Result	Away team	Attendance	Ref.
24 February 2020	FIBA EuroBasket 2021 Qualifier	Great Britain	81–73	Germany	2,800	
25 November 2021	FIBA 2023 Basketball World Cup Qualifier	Great Britain	78–69	Greece	2,600	
3 July 2022	FIBA 2023 Basketball World Cup Qualifier	Great Britain	71–85	Turkey	2,300	
28 August 2022	FIBA 2023 Basketball World Cup Qualifier	Great Britain	80–87	Latvia	2,300	
11 November 2022	FIBA 2023 Basketball World Cup Qualifier	Great Britain	68-74	Serbia	2,003	
24 February 2023	FIBA 2023 Basketball World Cup Qualifier	Great Britain	59-88	Belgium	2,239	
23 February 2024	FIBA EuroBasket 2025 Qualifier	Great Britain	98-94	Netherlands	2,213	
24 February 2025	FIBA EuroBasket 2025 Qualifier	Great Britain	96-75	Czech Republic	2,181	
27 February 2026	FIBA 2027 Basketball World Cup Qualifier	Great Britain	57-93	Italy	2,407	
30 August 2026	FIBA EuroBasket 2029 Pre-Qualifier	Great Britain	97-72	Slovakia	2,381	

== Boxing matches ==
Date	Competition	Main event	Result	Ref.
23 September 2023	MF & DAZN: X Series 009	Idris Virgo vs Aaron Chalmers	Virgo — TKO (3/5)	
14 September 2024	MF & DAZN: X Series 18 – Stake Pro Tournament Card	Elle Brooke vs Jenny Savage	Brooke — UD	
