= South Gloucestershire and Stroud College =

Location
- Filton Avenue; Bristol, BS34 7AT; England; 51.5136°N 2.5728°W

Information
- Former name: Filton College & Stroud College
- Type: Further education college
- Motto: Outstanding by Standing Out
- Established: 2012
- Local authority: South Gloucestershire
- Specialists: Sport and Performing and Theatre Arts
- Department for Education URN: 139238 Tables
- Ofsted: Reports
- Chair of Governors: Matt Atkinson
- CEO & Principal: David Withey
- Deputy Principal: Gavin Murray
- Gender: Mixed
- Age: 14 to Adult
- Enrolment: 15,521
- Campuses: Filton Campus, Stroud Campus, WISE (West of England Institute of Specialist Education) Campus, Brunel Centre, Queens Road Campus, Horizon Centre & Bristol Zoo Project.
- Campus type: Urban & City
- Colours: Blue & Green
- Partner University: University of Gloucestershire
- Website: www.sgscol.ac.uk

South Gloucestershire and Stroud College, also known as SGS College, is a college of further education and higher education based in South Gloucestershire and Stroud, England. It was established in February 2012 following the merger of Filton College and Stroud College. The college is made up of six campuses located in and around Bristol, North Bristol, South Gloucestershire and Stroud. In 2021, the college launched a University Centre at its WISE campus after being awarded university centre status by the Department for Education.

== History ==
South Gloucestershire and Stroud College was formed when Filton College and Stroud College merged in early 2012.

Filton College was founded in 1960 as Filton Technical College. By 1965 the college had over 2000 students, many of whom were part-time. In 1990 the college officially changed its name to Filton College. The next major development for the college was in 2005 when the WISE Campus (West of England Institute of Specialist Education) was opened, at a cost of £17.5 million. It is dedicated to performing arts, fine art and sport.

Stroud College started as a School of Art in 1860. This was later renamed The Technical College, and was located in various buildings in Stroud. Only in the 1950s, after the town council was gifted Stratford Park, did the college relocate to the present campus on Stratford Road. The Art Department remained for many years in the Art School in Stroud. The Gloucestershire College of Art was created from the merger of the Stroud School of Art and the Cheltenham College of Art in 1959.

David Withey, former CEO of the Education and Skills Funding Agency, was appointed CEO and Principal of the College in 2025, replacing Kevin Hamblin who had been CEO since 2001.

== Courses ==
SGS provides a number of qualifications including GCSE and A-level, as well as a number of vocational courses leading to BTEC First and National Diplomas and other similar qualifications, and some higher education courses leading HND, foundation degrees and full BA/BSc (Hons) degrees through partnership with the university of Gloucestershire It also runs EFL programmes for non-native speakers of English.

== Campuses & Study Centres ==
South Gloucestershire and Stroud College (SGS) operates three core campuses and three smaller study centres.

=== SGS Filton Campus ===
The Filton campus of the college is located in Filton Avenue, Filton, Bristol. A-level students attend classes at the main A-level Block (A-Block), adjacent to the main campus or in classrooms within the main site. At the A-level Block there is a small cafe selling hot drinks and a few hot meals.

BTEC/National Diploma students attend classes in the main block or in the Arts block (F-Block). Media/Photography Students attend classes in F-Block, which is across the car park from the main site or at WISE.

The campus has a refectory where hot food is served, a small sweet shop, and a Student Centre. CIC painted a mural in the canteen of the Filton campus, where Inkie and Felix Braun were students.

It has a workshop area known as Bristol Construction Academy which takes place in "R-Block". The college teaches a variety of trades, including plumbing, brick laying, gas and engineering.

=== SGS WISE Campus ===
The WISE (West of England Institute of Specialist Education) campus is located in New Road, Stoke Gifford adjacent to Abbeywood Community School opened in 2005 at a cost of £17.5 million. It is the main site for sports, performing and visual arts courses at the college. WISE is home to the Bristol Institute of Performing Arts (BIPA), Bristol School of Art, SGS Sport and since 2021 University Centre WISE.

SGS Sport has partnerships with Bristol Flyers basketball team, Bristol Rovers, Bristol Rugby and Gloucestershire County Cricket Club, and the women's football team, Bristol Academy W.F.C., plays at the highest level in England, the FA WSL. Stoke Gifford Stadium is the arena that hosts the association football, american football and athletics which was opened in 2011.

The Bristol Institute of Performing Arts (BIPA) is based in the first wing of the WISE campus and offers a range of further and higher education degree courses.

Degree Courses

- BA (Hons) Musical Theatre
- BA (Hons) Drama and Performance
- BA (Hons) Acting & Touring Theatre
- BA (Hons) Commercial Dance for Stage & Screen
- FdA Live Events Production
- FdA Digital Media
- BA (Hons) Specialist Make-Up Design
- BA (Hons) Prosthetics, Modelmaking & Digital Design

BIPA's facilities include 6 dance studios, 5 acting/rehearsal studios, TV studio, Mac editing suits, scenic workshop, wardrobe department, study zone, gym, theatre bar and The Olympus Theatre and Studio 22 theatre which puts on over 40 productions a year.

In 2021, the college launched its University Centre after remodelling its existing WISE Campus to accommodate additional degree students. The University Centre officially opened as University Centre WISE | West of England Institute of Specialist Education on Friday 19 November 2021.

=== SGS Stroud Campus ===
The Stroud campus is located in Stratford Road, Stroud. The campus has a remote education centre located in Dursley, Gloucestershire, and a co-operative sixth form site at Downfield Sixth Form with Marling School, Stroud High School and Archway School. The Stroud campus has a learning resource centre, construction workshops, learn IT centre, Envy hair and beauty salon, refectory, conference facilities as well as sports and leisure facilities.

=== SGS Queens Road (Bristol School of Art) ===
The SGS Queens Road Campus is located in the right wing of the Royal West of England Academy in Queens Road, Clifton, Bristol. The academy was Bristol's first art gallery and constructed in 1857.

=== SGS Clifton (now Bristol Zoo Project) ===
The SGS Clifton Campus is located at Bristol Zoo Gardens, Clifton, Bristol. The Clifton campus offers two degree courses in Zoological Management and Conservation. Bristol Zoo Gardens, run by the Bristol Zoological Charity, opened in 1836 and was the fifth oldest zoo in the world, before its closure to the public on September 3, 2022. Since its closure the colleges degree provision has remained at the Education Conservation Centre at the original Clifton site. Students are due to transfer to the new Bristol Zoo Project site (Previously, The Wild Place Project in North Bristol for September 2025). In the meantime degree students will study between both the original Clifton site and the new Bristol Zoo Project.

=== SGS Berkeley Green ===
SGS Berkeley Green opened in September 2017. The site is a 50-acre technology park, centred on the former Berkeley Nuclear Laboratories just south of the Berkeley Nuclear Power Station. Its main building, the John Huggett Engineering Hall, was converted from the laboratories former engineering hall building. The Berkeley Green campus is also home to the Berkeley Green UTC, part of the SGS Multi Academy Trust.

In August 2024, South Gloucestershire and Stroud (SGS) College finalised the sale of its 40-acre Berkeley Green site which it had been operating as Gloucestershire Science and Technology Park to Chiltern Vital Group (CVG) for £6.5 million, following an agreement reached in January 2024. The site, previously operated by SGS as a science park, is set to be transformed into a low-carbon 'super cluster' at the forefront of UK nuclear power.

=== SGS Horizon - Construction Training Centre ===
SGS Horizon opened in February 2023. The training centre is located on the Horizon 38 Business Park, within a mile of the SGS Filton Campus and dedicated to the delivery of construction-based apprenticeship training.

== University Centre ==
In 2021 the college successfully applied to the Department for Education for University Centre status in recognition of its high achieving National Student Survey results. This followed a score of 94% overall degree student satisfaction in 2020 which was the highest in Bristol. The college then launched its University Centre after a remodelling of the existing WISE campus. Since September 2021 most of the college's higher education provision has been at the University Centre.

== Notable alumni ==
- Antoine Semenyo, professional football player who plays for Manchester City F.C
- Milk Teeth, Punk band formed at the Stroud Campus
- Aimee Palmer, professional football player who plays for Bristol City W.F.C. and has represented Manchester United W.F.C.
- Scott Baldwin (rugby union), professional rugby player representing Ospreys and Wales
- Justin Lee Collins, BTEC Performing Arts
- Darren Dawidiuk, English rugby union footballer who plays for Gloucester Rugby
- Taulupe Faletau, professional rugby player representing Newport Gwent Dragons and Wales
- Stephen Gill, photographer and artist
- Michael Green, English footballer who plays for Gloucester City
- Mitch Hewer, actor from the TV series Skins
- Sajid Javid, English Conservative Party politician, former Chancellor of the Exchequer, and Member of Parliament (MP) for the Bromsgrove constituency (Filton Technical College)
- Steffan Jones, professional rugby player representing Newport Gwent Dragons
- Chris Lines, English footballer who plays for Bristol Rovers
- Craig Miles, English cricketer who currently plays for Gloucestershire
- Darren Mullings, English footballer who plays for Gloucester City A.F.C.
- Jojo Orme, musician who releases music under the name Heartworms
- Lamar Powell, English footballer.
- Precious Lara Quigaman, Miss International 2005
- Sean Rigg, English footballer who plays for Oxford United
- Ben Swallow, Welsh footballer who plays for Bromley
- Dan Watchurst, Welsh rugby union player for Newport RFC and the Newport Gwent Dragons
- Vanessa Winship
- Will Bayley, British table tennis player

== Gallery ==
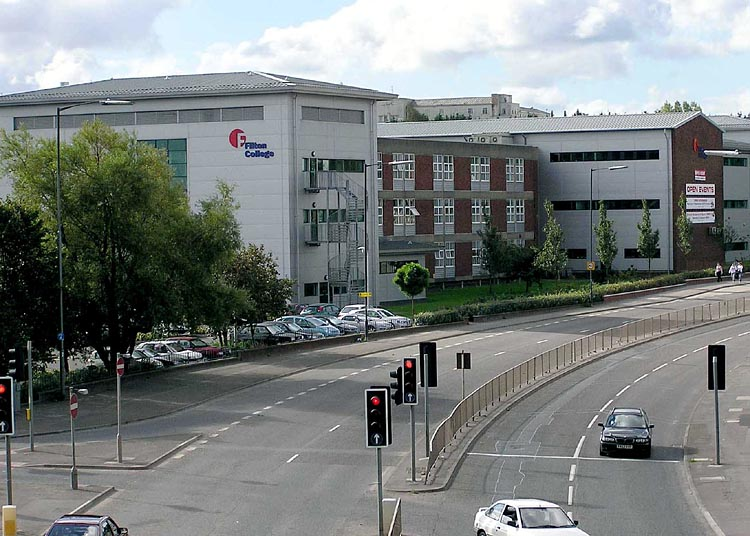
SGS Filton

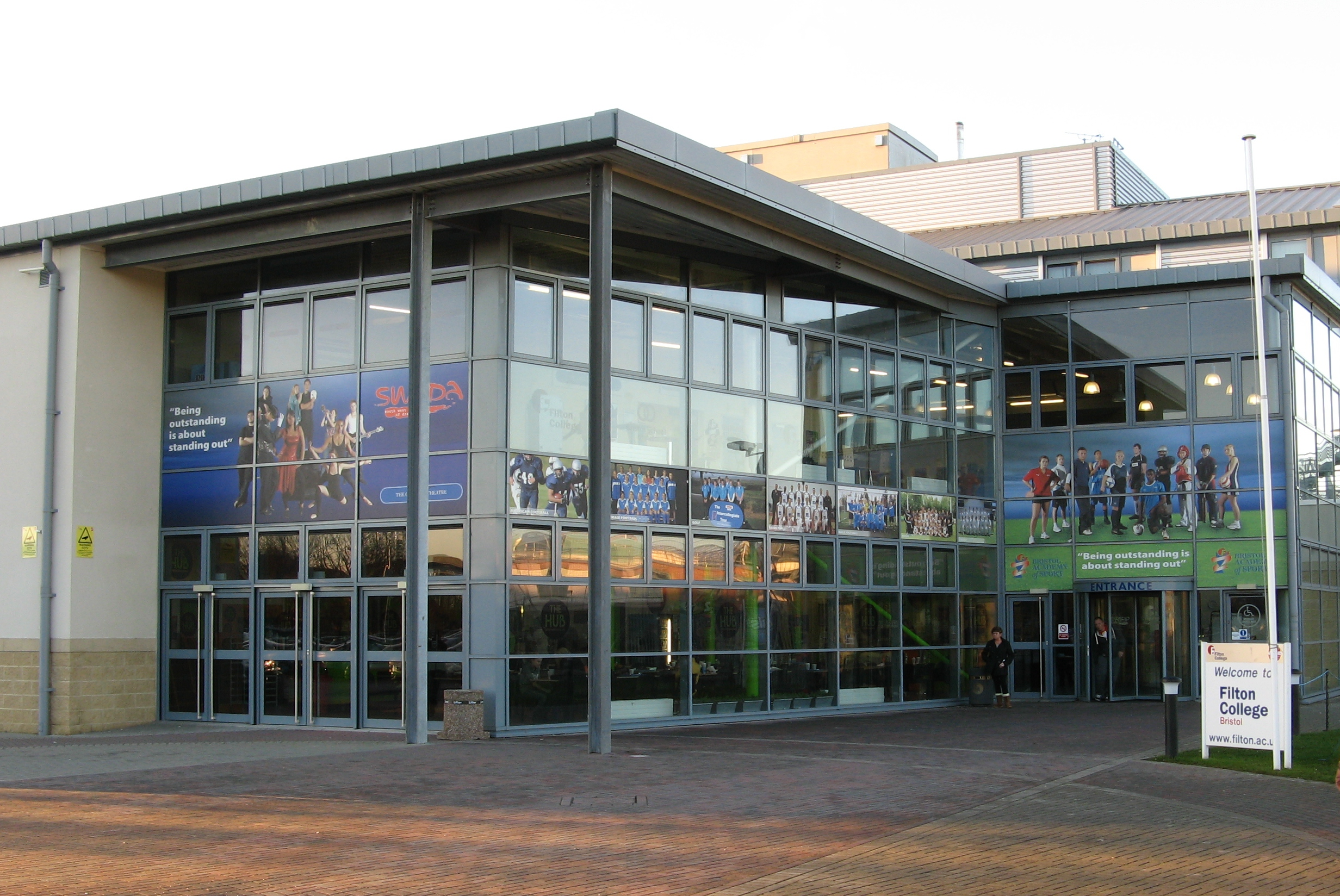
SGS Wise

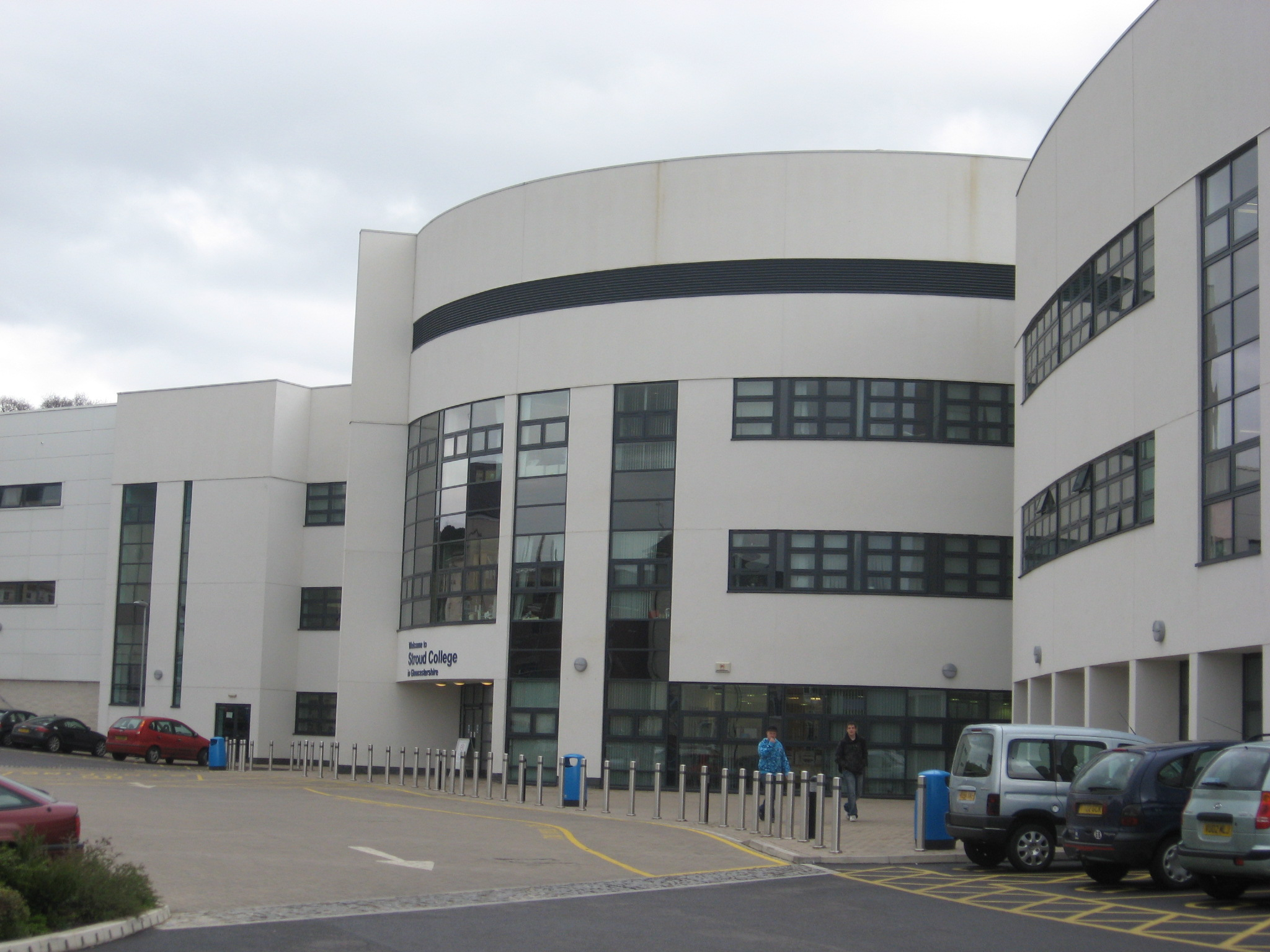
SGS Stroud

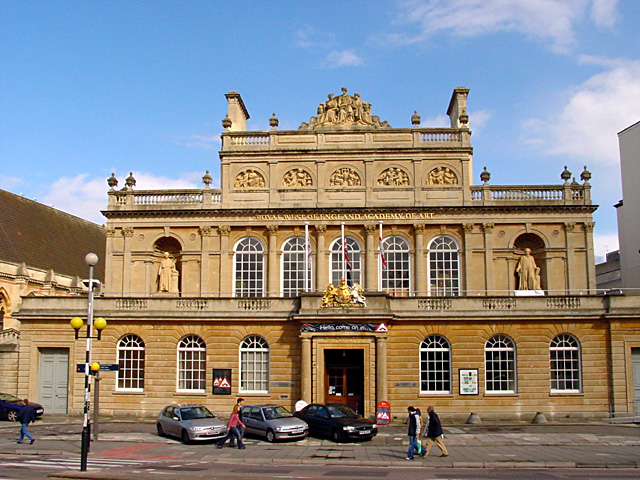
SGS Bristol - Royal West of England Academy
