= 2019–20 London Lions season =

- Head coach: (United Kingdom) Vince Macaulay
- Captain: (United Kingdom) Joe Ikhinmwin
- Arena: Copper Box Arena

BBL results
- Record: 10–4 (.714)
- Ladder: 2nd
- BBL Cup: Quarterfinalist (lost to Riders 72–63)
- BBL Trophy: First round (lost to Kestrels 82–92)
- Playoff finish: N/A
- Stats at BBL.org.uk

Player records
- Points: (United Kingdom) Soko 20.2
- Rebounds: (United States) Peel 8.9
- Assists: (United Kingdom) Robinson 4.9

The 2019–20 BBL season was the 43rd season for the London Lions in the BBL, and the 8th under the banner of London Lions.

The club won its first regular season title with a 99–80 victory over the Newcastle Eagles at the Eagles Community Arena on April 26, 2019.

The London Lions played their home games at the 7,000 seat Copper Box Arena in Queen Elizabeth Olympic Park, London.

Following a strong 2018-19 season where the Lions finished 27-6, they had many players depart the club such as Kervin Bristol, Ladarius Tabb, Jordan Spencer and Dzaflo Larkai.

In the 2019-20 season the Lions quickly resigned two-time BBL MVP Justin Robinson, Andre Lockhart and Lions captain Joe Ikhinmwin with the return of American forward Brandon Peel.

The Lions made one of the biggest signings in the BBL history and signed Ovie Soko to start at the small-forward position, along with new signings of Spanish guard Jorge Romero, Jordan Whelan from Worcester Wolves, Americans Dii’Jon Allen-Jordan from Cheshire Phoenix and Jordan Jackson.

The Lions also, signed Jules Dang-Akodo and Samuel Toluwase from the inaugural London City Royals team from the 2018–19 BBL season. Lions later signed French big man Alioune Tew at the center position.

On December 13, 2019, the Lions announced that the Club and guard/forward Dii’Jon Allen-Jordan have “mutually” agreed to part ways. With the departure of Allen-Jordan the Lions signed promising Ethiopian/American forward Buay Tuach on January, 10th, 2020. On January 17, 2020, the Lions signed British point guard Ogo Adegboye to replace Spanish guard Jorge Romero.

With the withdrawal of the London City Royals, Edmir Lucas signed with the London Lions to replace Ogo Adegboye on February 12, 2020, for the remainder of the 2019–20 BBL season. On February 14, 2020, Lucas scored 8 points in 14 minutes of action in a 66-75 away win against the Bristol Flyers in only his second game with the team.

On 17 March 2020, the season was postponed due to the COVID-19 pandemic in the United Kingdom. On 1 June 2020, the season was cancelled, with no League or Playoffs champions declared.

== Roster ==
Note: Flags indicate national team eligibility at FIBA-sanctioned events. Players may hold other non-FIBA nationalities not displayed.

2019–20 London Lions roster
Players
Coaches

Pos.	No.	Nat.	Name	Ht.	Wt.
F	00	(United Kingdom)	Soko, Ovie	2.01 m (6 ft 7 in)	100 kg (220 lb)
F	1	(Nigeria)	Toluwase, Samuel	1.94 m (6 ft 4 in)	102 kg (225 lb)
G	2	(Angola)	Lucas, Edmir	1.93 m (6 ft 4 in)	94 kg (207 lb)
C	5	(United States)	Jackson, Jordan (DP)	2.06 m (6 ft 9 in)	99 kg (218 lb)
G	6	(Barbados)	Lockhart, Andre	1.83 m (6 ft 0 in)	86 kg (190 lb)
F	7	(United Kingdom)	Ikhinmwin, Joe (C)	1.98 m (6 ft 6 in)	100 kg (220 lb)
F	9	(United Kingdom)	Whelan, Jordan	1.93 m (6 ft 4 in)	91 kg (201 lb)
G	10	(United Kingdom)	Robinson, Justin	1.85 m (6 ft 1 in)	81 kg (179 lb)
G	17	(Cameroon)	Dang-Akodo, Jules	1.91 m (6 ft 3 in)	82 kg (181 lb)
F	21	(Ethiopia)	Tuach, Buay	1.98 m (6 ft 6 in)	84 kg (185 lb)
F	22	(United States)	Peel, Brandon	2.01 m (6 ft 7 in)	94 kg (207 lb)
C	33	(France)	Tew, Alioune	2.06 m (6 ft 9 in)	98 kg (216 lb)

Head coach

- (United Kingdom) Vince Macaulay

Assistant coach(es)

- (United Kingdom) Dave Greenaway
- (United Kingdom) Laurent Irish
- (United Kingdom) Nikhil Lawry
- (United Kingdom) Nigel Lloyd

Legend

- (C) Team captain
- (DP) Development player
- Injured

- Roster
Updated: February 12, 2020

=== Depth chart ===
Pos.	Starting 5	Bench 1	Bench 2	Development
C	Ovie Soko	Alioune Tew		Jordan Jackson
PF	Brandon Peel	Samuel Toluwase
SF	Buay Tuach	Joe Ikhinmwin	Jordan Whelan
SG	Jules Dang-Akodo	Edmir Lucas
PG	Justin Robinson	Andre Lockhart

== Cup ==
The newly-formatted BBL Cup will begin the 2019–20 season on Friday 20 September, with the group stages running until Sunday 24 November. The 12 teams have been split into 2 geographical groups, North and South. Each team will play each other twice (once home, once away) with the top 4 teams in each group progressing to the Quarter Finals. Single-legged quarter finals and two-legged semi finals matches will determine the two finalists who will contest the Cup Final on Sunday 26 January at the Arena Birmingham.

=== South Group ===
Pos	Team	Pld	W	L	PF	PA	PD	Qualification
1	London City Royals	10	8	2	860	793	+67	Quarter Finals
2	Worcester Wolves	10	6	4	798	798	0	Quarter Finals
3	Bristol Flyers	10	6	4	835	837	−2	Quarter Finals
4	London Lions	10	5	5	892	872	+20	Quarter Finals
5	Surrey Scorchers	10	3	7	829	862	−33	
6	Plymouth Raiders	10	2	8	849	901	−52	

Source: http://www.bbl.org.uk/

=== Game log ===
2019–20 game log
BBL Cup Qualification Stage: 5–5 (Home: 4–1; Road: 1–4)

Game	Date	Team	Score	High points	High rebounds	High assists	Location	Record
1	September 20	@ Worcester Wolves	L 92–67	Brandon Peel (30)	Brandon Peel (15)	Lockhart, Robinson (4)	Worcester Arena	0–1
2	October 5	@ London City Royals	L 92–77	Brandon Peel (19)	Brandon Peel (13)	Justin Robinson (7)	Crystal Palace National Sports Centre	0–2
3	October 19	@ Bristol Flyers	L 97–94	Brandon Peel (35)	Brandon Peel (7)	Justin Robinson (7)	SGS College Arena	0–3
4	October 23	Plymouth Raiders	W 101–86	Dang-Akodo, Robinson (17)	Allen-Jordan, Peel (9)	Justin Robinson (7)	Copper Box Arena	1–3
5	October 26	@ Surrey Scorchers	L 80–77	Brandon Peel (25)	Brandon Peel (14)	Justin Robinson (6)	Surrey Sports Park	1–4
6	November 1	London City Royals	W 100–99	Justin Robinson (23)	Brandon Peel (11)	Justin Robinson (10)	Copper Box Arena	2–4
7	November 3	@ Plymouth Raiders	W 80–90	Brandon Peel (23)	Brandon Peel (11)	Jorge Romero (5)	Plymouth Pavilions	3–4
8	November 8	Worcester Wolves	L 85–90	Dii’Jon Allen-Jordan (31)	Jorge Romero (7)	Jorge Romero (4)	University of East London	3–5
9	November 20	Bristol Flyers	W 103–69	Brandon Peel (27)	Brandon Peel (12)	Jorge Romero (4)	Copper Box Arena	4–5
10	November 23	Surrey Scorchers	W 98–87	Brandon Peel (25)	Brandon Peel (11)	Justin Robinson (8)	Copper Box Arena	5–5

BBL Cup Quarter Finals: 0–1 (Home: 0–0; Road: 0–1)

Game	Date	Team	Score	High points	High rebounds	High assists	Location	Record
11	November 29	@ Leicester Riders	L 72–63	Brandon Peel (23)	Alioune Tew (9)	Justin Robinson (2)	Morningside Arena	5–6

== Trophy ==
The BBL Trophy retains the same format as introduced in 2018–19. The 12 BBL teams are joined in the first round draw by 4 invited teams; Solent Kestrels and Worthing Thunder from the English Basketball League, Dunfermline Reign from the Scottish Basketball Championship and Basketball Wales. There is an open draw to form a bracket, mapping out each team's path to the final which will be held, for the 8th consecutive year, at the Emirates Arena in Glasgow.

=== Game log ===
2019–20 game log
BBL Trophy 1st Round: 0–1 (Home: 0–1; Road: 0–0)

Game	Date	Team	Score	High points	High rebounds	High assists	Location	Record
1	January 4	Solent Kestrels	L 82-92	Justin Robinson (19)	Brandon Peel (8)	Dang Akodo, Robinson (4)	University of East London	0-1

== Championship ==
=== Ladder ===
The BBL Championship will run from Friday 6 December – Sunday 19 April. All 12 teams will play each other twice, once home once away, for a 22-game regular season. The top 8 teams will qualify for the end of season Playoffs. London City Royals withdrew from the league, and their 1–3 record was expunged. (Note: The results expunged were a 98–90 victory over Plymouth Raiders, and losses of 104–89 against London Lions, 95–71 to Bristol Flyers and a 20–0 forfeit against Glasgow Rocks.)

On 17 March 2020, the season was postponed due to the COVID-19 pandemic in the United Kingdom. On 1 June 2020, the season was cancelled, with no League or Playoffs champions declared.

==== Regular-season standings ====
Pos	Team	Pld	W	L	PF	PA	PD	Pts	Qualification
1	Glasgow Rocks	15	12	3	1275	1089	+186	24	
2	London Lions	14	10	4	1280	1159	+121	20	Basketball Champions League qualifying rounds
3	Worcester Wolves	14	9	5	1173	1106	+67	18	
4	Leicester Riders	12	8	4	1048	975	+73	16	
5	Newcastle Eagles	13	7	6	1147	1119	+28	14	
6	Cheshire Phoenix	13	7	6	1079	1060	+19	14	
7	Sheffield Sharks	13	7	6	1060	1060	0	14	
8	Bristol Flyers	12	5	7	937	992	−55	10	
9	Surrey Scorchers	14	5	9	1243	1340	−97	10	
10	Plymouth Raiders	13	3	10	1098	1185	−87	6	
11	Manchester Giants	13	0	13	1003	1258	−255	0	
12	London City Royals	0	0	0	0	0	0	0	Withdrew from the league

Updated to match(es) played on 14 March 2020. Source: BBC Sport

=== Game log ===
2019–20 game log
December: 4–1 (Home: 3–0; Road: 1–1)

Game	Date	Team	Score	High points	High rebounds	High assists	Location	Record
1	December 8	Glasgow Rocks	W 88-72	Brandon Peel (18)	Ovie Soko (13)	Jorge Romero (4)	Copper Box Arena	1-0
2	December 15	@ Manchester Giants	W 73-103	Justin Robinson (17)	Brandon Peel (8)	Dang-Akodo, Robinson (5)	George H. Carnall Sports Centre	2-0
3	December 18	Bristol Flyers	W 99-88	Ovie Soko (22)	Peel, Soko (7)	Lockhart, Robinson (4)	Copper Box Arena	3-0
4	December 22	Sheffield Sharks	W 87-79	Ovie Soko (17)	Alioune Tew (10)	Justin Robinson (6)	Copper Box Arena	4-0
5	December 27	@ Worcester Wolves	L 80-78	Peel, Robinson (18)	Brandon Peel (14)	Justin Robinson (5)	Worcester Arena	4-1

January: 3–1 (Home: 1–0; Road: 2–1)

Game	Date	Team	Score	High points	High rebounds	High assists	Location	Record
6	January 10	@ Plymouth Raiders	W 82-91	Ovie Soko (21)	Brandon Peel (12)	Justin Robinson (7)	Plymouth Pavilions	5-1
7	January 17	Surrey Scorchers	W 107-98	Ovie Soko (27)	Buay Tuach (9)	Justin Robinson (6)	Copper Box Arena	6-1
8	January 19	@ Sheffield Sharks	W 86-91	Justin Robinson (27)	Ovie Soko (11)	Ikhinmwin, Robinson (3)	Ponds Forge	7-1
9	January 31	@ Leicester Riders	L 83-76	Ovie Soko (21)	Ovie Soko (9)	Dang-Akodo, Robinson, Soko, Whelan (3)	Morningside Arena	7-2

February: 2–1 (Home: 1–0; Road: 1–1)

Game	Date	Team	Score	High points	High rebounds	High assists	Location	Record
10	February 7	@ Newcastle Eagles	L 108-97	Ovie Soko (33)	Buay Tuach (10)	Lockhart, Robinson (6)	Eagles Community Arena	7-3
11	February 12	Cheshire Phoenix	W 94-78	Justin Robinson (19)	Joe Ikhinmwin (8)	Justin Robinson (6)	Copper Box Arena	8-3
12	February 14	@ Bristol Flyers	W 66-75	Peel, Robinson (14)	Alioune Tew (11)	Dang-Akodo, Robinson (5)	SGS College Arena	9-3

March: 1–1 (Home: 1–0; Road: 0–1)

Game	Date	Team	Score	High points	High rebounds	High assists	Location	Record
13	March 1	Leicester Riders	W 99-65	Brandon Peel (23)	Brandon Peel (13)	Justin Robinson (6)	Copper Box Arena	10-3
14	March 7	@ Surrey Scorchers	L 101-95	Ovie Soko (25)	Peel, Soko (12)	Peel, Soko, Tuach (3)	Surrey Sports Park	10-4

April: 0–0 (Home: 0–0; Road: 0–0)

Game	Date	Team	Score	High points	High rebounds	High assists	Location	Record
15	April 1	Newcastle Eagles	boxscore	N/A	N/A	N/A	Copper Box Arena	N/A
16	April 4	Worcester Wolves	boxscore	N/A	N/A	N/A	Copper Box Arena	N/A
17	April 5	@ Cheshire Phoenix	boxscore	N/A	N/A	N/A	Cheshire Oaks Arena	N/A
18	April 8	Manchester Giants	boxscore	N/A	N/A	N/A	Copper Box Arena	N/A
19	April 12	@ Glasgow Rocks	boxscore	N/A	N/A	N/A	Emirates Arena	N/A
20	April 17	Plymouth Raiders	boxscore	N/A	N/A	N/A	Copper Box Arena	N/A

== Player statistics ==
=== BBL Championship statistics ===
Category	Player	Pld	Totals	Average
Points per game	Ovie Soko	12	242	20.2
Rebounds per game	Brandon Peel	14	125	8.9
Assists per game	Justin Robinson	13	64	4.9
Steals per game	Justin Robinson	13	19	1.5
Blocks per game	Alioune Tew	14	13	0.9
FG%	Samuel Toluwase	11	11-17	64.7%
3FG%	Samuel Toluwase	11	4-7	57.1%
FT%	Justin Robinson	13	35-40	87.5%

=== BBL Cup statistics ===
Category	Player	Pld	Totals	Average
Points per game	Brandon Peel	11	252	22.9
Rebounds per game	Brandon Peel	11	117	10.6
Assists per game	Justin Robinson	11	58	5.3
Steals per game	Dii’Jon Allen-Jordan	11	20	1.8
Steals per game	Justin Robinson	11	20	1.8
Blocks per game	Brandon Peel	11	12	1.1
FG%	Alioune Tew	4	16-24	66.7%
3FG%	Brandon Peel	11	17-32	53.1%
FT%	Justin Robinson	11	38-42	90.5%

== See also ==
- 2019–20 British Basketball League season
- London Lions
