= 2017–18 BBL Cup =

BBL Cup
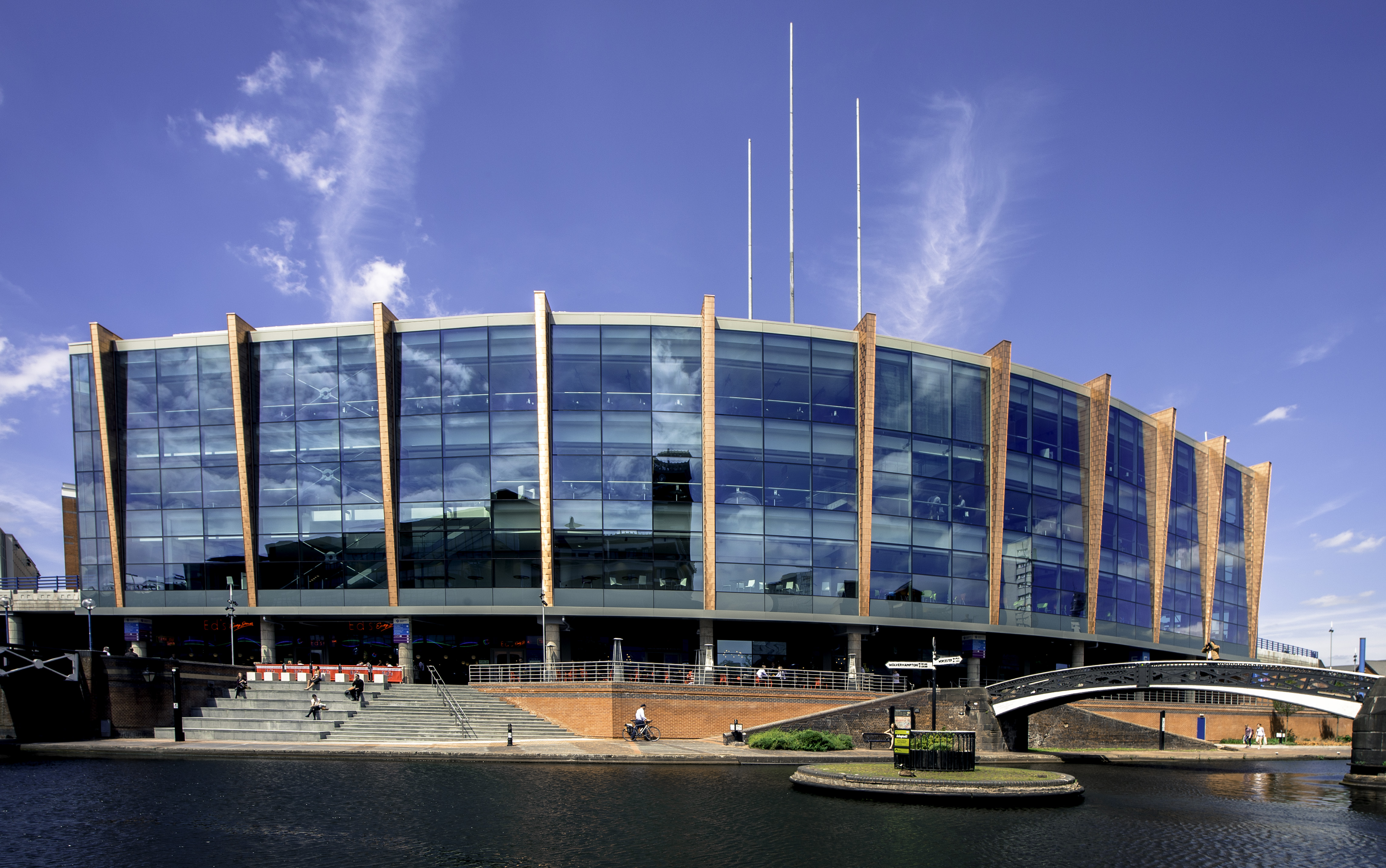
- The Arena Birmingham in Birmingham hosted the final
- Season: 2017–18
- Dates: 13 October – 28 January 2018

Regular season
- Season MVP: Malcolm Riley

Finals
- Champions: Cheshire Phoenix (1st title)
- Runners-up: Worcester Wolves

The 2017–18 BBL Cup was the 15th edition of the BBL Cup, the annual cup competition for British basketball teams, organised by the British Basketball League (BBL). The Cheshire Phoenix won its first title. The competition was played from 13 October 2017 until 28 January 2018.

== Bracket ==
Round of 16
Worcester Wolves	101
Manchester Giants	80
Surrey Scorchers	74
Plymouth Raiders	71
Bristol Flyers	79
Cheshire Phoenix	82
London Lions	105
Leeds Force	67

Quarter-finals
Glasgow Rocks	85
Worcester Wolves	97
DBL Sharks Sheffield	93
Surrey Scorchers	64
Newcastle Eagles	79
Cheshire Phoenix	80
Leicester Riders	59
London Lions	67

Semi-finals
Worcester Wolves	102	71	173
DBL Sharks Sheffield	92	65	157
Cheshire Phoenix	74	83	157
London Lions	87	67	154

Final
28 January – Birmingham
Worcester Wolves	88
Cheshire Phoenix	99

== See also ==
- 2017–18 British Basketball League season
- 2017–18 BBL Trophy
