= 2017–18 BBL Trophy =

BBL Trophy
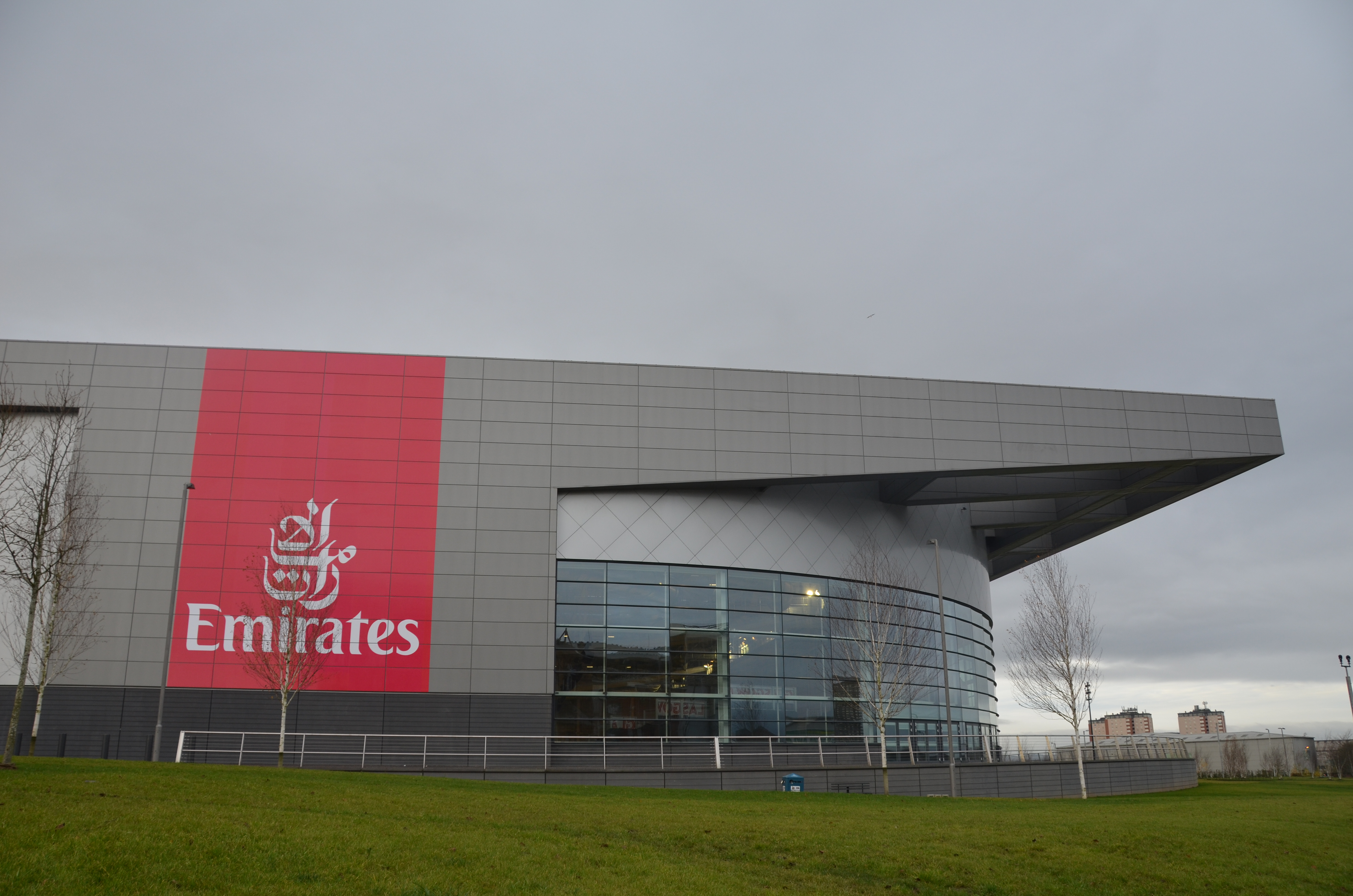
- The Emirates Arena in Glasgow hosted the final
- Season: 2017–18
- Dates: 8 December 2017 – 4 March 2018
- Games played: 17
- Teams: 16

Regular season
- Season MVP: J.R. Holder

Finals
- Champions: Leicester Riders (3rd title)
- Runners-up: DBL Sharks Sheffield

The 2017–18 BBL Trophy was the 30th edition of the BBL Trophy, an annual cup competition for British basketball teams, organised by the British Basketball League (BBL). Besides BBL clubs, clubs from the National Basketball League (NBL) participated. The Leicester Riders won their third trophy title. The competition was played from 8 December 2017 until 4 March 2018.

== Participants ==
British Basketball League (BBL)

- Leicester Riders
- Plymouth Raiders
- Newcastle Eagles
- Leeds Force
- Glasgow Rocks
- Worcester Wolves
- Sheffield Sharks
- London Lions
- Surrey Scorchers
- Manchester Giants

NBL Division 1

- Loughborough Student Riders
- Manchester Magic
- Sony Centre Fury
- Team Northumbria

== Bracket ==
Round of 16
Manchester Giants	73
London Lions	105
Sony Centre Fury	56
Loughborough Student Riders	83
Plymouth Raiders	84
Bristol Flyers	80
Leeds Force	59
Leicester Riders	104
Cheshire Phoenix	79
Glasgow Rocks	75
Team Northumbria	63
Worcester Wolves	93
Newcastle Eagles	87
Surrey Scorchers	76
DBL Sharks Sheffield	89
Manchester Magic	62

Quarter-finals
London Lions	81
Loughborough Student Riders	73
Plymouth Raiders	83
Leicester Riders	90
Cheshire Phoenix	90
Worcester Wolves	97
Newcastle Eagles	76
DBL Sharks Sheffield	81

Semi-finals
London Lions	81	65	146
Leicester Riders	90	92	182
Worcester Wolves	86	66	152
DBL Sharks Sheffield	86	75	161

Final
4 March – Glasgow
Leicester Riders	90
DBL Sharks Sheffield	85

== See also ==
- 2017–18 British Basketball League season
- 2017–18 BBL Cup
