= 2017–18 BBL season =

2017–18 BBL season may refer to:

- 2017–18 British Basketball League
- 2017–18 Basketball Bundesliga
