= Greg Streete =

British basketball player (born 1988)

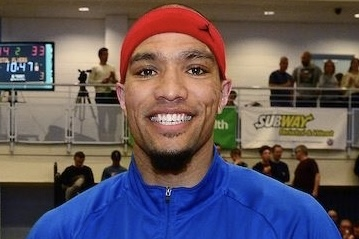
- Streete in 2017.

Personal information
- Born: 17 March 1988 (age 38) Bristol, England
- Listed height: 6 ft 4 in (1.93 m)

Career information
- High school: Whitefield Fishponds Community School (now Bristol Metropolitan Academy)
- Playing career: 2006–2018
- Position: Guard
- Number: 11

Career history
- 2006–2018: Bristol Flyers

Career highlights
- Great Britain National Team U16 (2004); Great Britain National Team U18 (2006); British National Cup Winner (2010); British National Cup Finalist (2013); Bristol Green Capital Ambassador (2015); British Basketball League Cup Semi-finals (2015); Newcastle Eagles' All Star Five (2016)

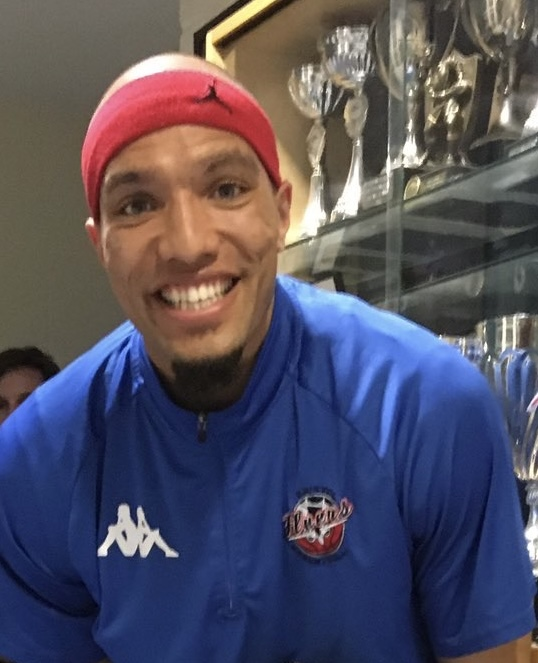
Greg Streete in 2017.

Gregory Jermaine Mark Streete (born 17 March 1988) is a British former professional basketball player. He played his entire career with the Bristol Flyers, serving as team captain for nine years. Streete was instrumental in the Flyers' promotion to the British Basketball League (BBL) in 2014. After retiring in 2018, he pursued a career as a firefighter.

== Early life and high school career ==
Streete was born in Bristol, England, and developed his basketball skills through the Bristol Flyers' youth system. He went to Whitefield Fishponds Community School (now Bristol Metropolitan Academy). He emerged as one of the top young prospects in the region, eventually earning a place in the Flyers' senior squad at age 17.

== Professional career ==
=== Bristol Flyers (2006–2018) ===
Streete joined the Bristol Academy Flyers in 2006, and played for the club until his retirement. He was named team captain in 2008, a role he held for nine seasons. Under his leadership, the Flyers earned promotion to the British Basketball League (BBL) in 2014.

Streete played 102 BBL games, scoring a total of 1,009 points, averaging 9.9 points per game. He was known as Bristol Flyers' record breaker and praised for his defensive ability, rebounding, and versatility as a guard-forward.

Streete took a year-long career break in 2017 before announcing his official retirement from basketball in 2018. Streete was awarded with a testimonial game to honour his time and commitment to the club.

=== Year-by-year career statistics ===
Legend

- **GP** – Games played
- **PPG** – Points per game
- **RPG** – Rebounds per game
- **APG** – Assists per game
- **SPG** – Steals per game
- **BPG** – Blocks per game
- **FG%** – Field goal percentage
- **3P%** – Three-point field goal percentage
- **FT%** – Free throw percentage

Year-by-year career statistics
Season	Team	League	GP	PPG	RPG	APG	SPG	BPG	FG%	3P%	FT%
2006–07	Bristol Academy	EBL2	—	—	—	—	—	—	—	—	—
2007–08	Bristol Academy Flyers	EBL	—	—	—	—	—	—	—	—	—
2008–09	Bristol Academy Flyers	EBL	14	12.7	6.2	3.1	2.5	—	42.5%	22.9%	65.5%
2009–10	Bristol Academy Flyers	EBL	19	13.5	5.4	3.8	3.4	—	—	—	—
2010–11	Bristol Academy Flyers	EBL	16	13.5	5.4	3.8	3.4	—	49.5%	22.0%	67.4%
2011–12	Bristol Academy Flyers	EBL	18	14.1	6.1	4.0	2.9	—	48.3%	25.4%	69.8%
2012–13	Bristol Academy Flyers	EBL	20	15.0	6.5	4.3	3.1	—	50.2%	27.1%	71.2%
2013–14	Bristol Academy Flyers	EBL	22	15.8	7.0	4.5	3.5	—	51.7%	28.6%	73.4%
2014–15	Bristol Flyers	BBL	30	9.8	5.1	3.0	2.2	0.4	42.9%	30.0%	70.1%
2015–16	Bristol Flyers	BBL	32	10.3	5.6	3.2	2.4	0.5	44.1%	31.8%	71.5%
2016–17	Bristol Flyers	BBL	28	9.1	5.3	2.9	2.1	0.3	41.8%	29.5%	68.7%
2017–18	Bristol Flyers	BBL	24	8.7	4.9	2.7	2.0	0.2	40.3%	28.0%	67.2%

=== National Team career ===
Streete represented Great Britain at youth level. In the 2004 European Championship for Men U16 – Division B, he played 9 games, averaging 2.1 points, 1.1 rebounds, 0.4 assists, and an efficiency rating of 1.9.

He later played in the 2006 U18 European Championship Men – Division B, appearing in 4 games, averaging 0.8 points, 1.3 rebounds, 0.3 assists, and an efficiency rating of 1.3.

== Awards and achievements ==
- British U16 National Team (2004)
- British U18 National Team (2006)
- FIBA U18 European Championship Division B – Semi-finals (2006)
- British National Cup Winner (2010)
- British EBL Division One Semi-finals (2010, 2011, 2012)
- British EBL Division One Regular Season Champion (2011)
- Eurobasket.com All-British EBL Division One Honorable Mention (2011, 2013)
- British EBL Division One Regular Season Runner-up (2012, 2013)
- British National Cup Finalist (2013)
- British Green Capital Ambassador (2015)
- British BBL Cup Semi-finals (2015).
- Newcastle Eagles' All Star Five (2016)

== Career Bests ==
Greg Streete's Career Best Performances.
Statistic	Value	Opponent	Score	Date
Points	30	Plymouth Raiders	70–78	10 April 2016
Rebounds (Defensive)	10	N/A	N/A	4 games
Rebounds (Offensive)	7	Worthing Thunder	67–69	11 June 2011
Total Rebounds	14	Leeds Force	71–47	27 February 2015
Assists	10	N/A	N/A	3 games
Steals	4	N/A	N/A	5 games
Blocks	3	Glasgow Rocks	62–79	28 September 2014
Two-Point Field Goals Made	10	Hemel Storm	73–48	16 March 2013
Three-Point Field Goals Made	6	London Lions	86–66	2 October 2016
Free throws made	10	N/A	N/A	3 games
Double-Doubles	13	N/A	N/A	N/A
Triple-Doubles	1	N/A	N/A	N/A
Efficiency Rating (RANK)	55	Newcastle Eagles	67–102	26 November 2016

== Personal life ==
Streete was born and raised in Bristol. He married Danielle Streete in 2019. He has three sons, two from previous relationships and one with his wife, Danielle.

== Post-basketball career ==
In 2018, Streete retired from professional basketball and joined Avon Fire & Rescue Service in Bristol.
