= Rashad Hassan =

American basketball player (born 1989)

No. 22 – CD Español de Osorno
- Position: Power forward
- League: Liga Nacional de Básquetbol de Chile

Personal information
- Born: September 23, 1989 (age 37) Riverdale, Georgia, U.S.
- Listed height: 6 ft 8 in (2.03 m)
- Listed weight: 215 lb (98 kg)

Career information
- High school: Riverdale High School
- College: Savannah State (2008–2013)
- Playing career: 2013–present

Career history
- 2013–2015: Leicester Riders
- 2015–2016: Sparta Bertrange
- 2016: Montevideo BBC
- 2016–2017: London Lions
- 2017–2018: Rueil Athletic Club
- 2018: Sparta Bertrange
- 2018–2020: Plymouth Raiders
- 2020–2021: Surrey Scorchers
- 2021–2024: Plymouth City Patriots
- 2024–present: CD Español de Osorno

Career highlights
- 2x BBL Team of the Year (2015, 2017); 1x Total League All Star 2nd Team (2016)

Rashad Enri Hassan (born 23 September 1989) is an American professional basketball player who currently plays for the CD Español de Osorno in the Liga Nacional de Básquetbol de Chile (LNB). He played college basketball for Savannah State Tigers.

== College career ==
Hassan played for the Savannah State Tigers in NCAA Division 1. In his freshman year, Hassan averaged 8.6 points and 3.6 rebounds per game and received Honorable Mention honors on the 2008–09 Division I All-Independent men's basketball team. In his sophomore year, he averaged 11 points and 5.5 rebounds per game was named in the 2010 All-Independent Men's Basketball Team. In his junior year Hassan averaged 13 points and 5.3 rebounds per game, and aided the team to the Mid-Eastern Athletic Conference regular season title along with an appearance in the 2012 National Invitation Tournament. In his senior year Hassan averaged 12.6 points and 5.8 rebounds per game.

== Professional career ==
In 2013, Hassan signed his first professional contract for the Leicester Riders in the BBL. In his rookie season, Hassan averaged 15.7 points and 8 rebounds per game whilst helping the Riders to win the BBL Cup, with a 72–69 victory over Newcastle Eagles in the Final; Hassan scored 10 points and 9 rebounds. During his second season for the Leicester-based team, Hassan averaged 18.2 points and 7 rebounds per game, finishing as the team's top scorer and rebounder. He scored a career-high 35 points against Sheffield Sharks on 16 January 2015, and was named on the league's Team of the Year roster in the post-season awards.

After two successful seasons at Leicester, Hassan signed for Sparta Bertrange of Luxembourg in 2015. In 28 games, Hassan averaged 21.1 points and 12.9 rebounds per game, earning a place on the league's All-Star 2nd Team. After a brief appearance in Uruguay, playing 4 games for Montevideo BBC, Hassan returned to the British Basketball League for the 2016–17 season by signing with the London Lions. In his third season in the United Kingdom, Hassan averaged 19.7 points and 8.3 rebounds, leading the team as top scorer and rebounder and being named to the BBL Team of the Year for a second time.

Following the conclusion of the 2016–17 BBL season, Hassan embarked on a nomadic period with two spells in Australia, with Rockhampton Rockets and Albury Wodonga Bandits respectively, alongside a stint in France with Rueil Athletic Club and a short-lived return to Luxembourg and former team Sparta Bertrange. In October 2018 Hassan returned to the United Kingdom once more, signing with Plymouth Raiders for the 2018–19 season. Hassan lead the team in points scored, averaging 19.9 per game. In his second season for the Raiders, Hassan was averaging 18.5 points and 8.3 rebounds per game prior to the campaign being cancelled due to the COVID-19 pandemic. Following the resumption of the BBL for the 2020–21 season, Hassan appeared briefly for the Surrey Scorchers before moving to the Saudi Premier League in December 2020 to sign for Al Nasr Riyadh, before transferring to Al-Ahli Jeddah.

In December 2021 Hassan returned to the United Kingdom for a fifth time to sign for newly-formed Plymouth City Patriots. In his first season for the Patriots, Hassan averaged 16.3 points per game, whilst leading the team with 7.3 rebounds per game. On 23 June 2022, it was announced that Hassan had signed for a second season at the Patriots.

== International career ==
Hassan has dual American and Saudi Arabian citizenship and has had try-outs with the Saudi Arabia national team.
