= Edmir Lucas =

Angolan basketball player (born 1993)

No. 47 – Petro de Luanda
- Position: Shooting guard
- League: Unitel Basket; BAL

Personal information
- Born: 15 July 1993 (age 33) Luanda, Angola
- Listed height: 1.93 m (6 ft 4 in)
- Listed weight: 94 kg (207 lb)

Career information
- College: Wimbledon College (2008–2009)
- Playing career: 2010–present

Career history
- 2010–2012: Westminster Warriors
- 2012–2016: Primeiro de Agosto
- 2016–2018: Petro de Luanda
- 2018–2020: London City Royals
- 2020–2021: London Lions
- 2023: Interclube
- 2023–present: Petro de Luanda

Career highlights
- FIBA Africa Clubs Champions Cup champion (2013); BAL champion (2024); Angolan League champion (2016); Angolan Supercup winner (2023)

Edmir Ivo David Lucas (born 15 July 1993) is an Angolan basketball player who currently for Petro de Luanda. Lucas, who stands at 193 cm (6 ft 4 in), plays as a shooting guard.

== Professional career ==
Lucas started his career with the Westminster Warriors in the United Kingdom.

From 2012, he played for Angolan side Primeiro de Agosto in the Angolan BAI Basket.

In 2016, Lucas transferred between two of the biggest Angolan teams when he signed for two seasons with Petro de Luanda.

In 2018, Lucas signed with British team London City Royals of the British Basketball League (BBL). He won the 2018–19 BBL Trophy with the Royals.

With the withdrawal of the London City Royals, Lucas signed with the London Lions to replace Ogo Adegboye on 12 February 2020 for the remainder of the 2019–20 BBL season. On 14 February 2020 Lucas scored 8 points in 14 minutes of action in a 66–75 away win against the Bristol Flyers in only his second game with the team. He averaged 10 points per game shooting 40% from behind the arc. On 28 July 2020 Lucas re-signed with London.

On 19 March 2023, Lucas joined Interclube for the playoffs of the Angolan Basketball League, returning to the league after a 6-year absence. He returned to Petro de Luanda for a seconds tint in the 2023–24 season.

== International career ==
In May 2013, Lucas was summoned for the 2013 Afrobasket preliminary Angolan squad.

== Honours ==
Primeiro de Agosto

- FIBA Africa Clubs Champions Cup: 2013
- Angolan League: 2015–16

London City Royals

- BBL Trophy: 2018–19

== Personal life ==
Lucas is married with two children.
