= Brody Bishop =

Canadian-British basketball player

Brody Bishop (born May 28, 1984, in Prince Rupert, British Columbia) is a Canadian-British professional basketball player. He played for the Bristol Flyers of the English Basketball League (EBL).

The 6"1 point guard's love for basketball was instilled by his father, Mel Bishop, who was a basketball star in England during the 1970s, playing for Cinzano Crystal Palace.

In high school, Brody led his team, the Prince Rupert Rainmakers, to an 'AA' provincial championship in 2000-2001 and went on to play for the Under-17 provincial team. Following his high school graduation, he left to play JuCo Basketball at Gogebic Community College in Michigan and then returned to Canada, where he attended Laurentian University in Ontario, starting at point guard for each of his four years. In his final season at Laurentian, he averaged 15.7 points, 4.8 rebounds, and 3 assists per game.

In July 2007, Bishop signed his first professional contract with BBL team the Plymouth Raiders, after turning down offers from fellow BBL team the Sheffield Sharks and their EBL rivals Sheffield Arrows. He chose the Raiders because he "felt it would be a good fit [for him] as a first year player." Bishop made his debut wearing number 13 in the BBL Cup Winners' Cup first leg against Guildford Heat on September 9, 2007. Although his team lost 77–83, he was crowned the game's MVP.

After being released from the Plymouth Raiders, Brody signed with the Bristol Flyers for the 2008–09 season and was the starting point guard for the Division 1 team

Bishop has British citizenship, qualifying due to his family's British heritage: his Mother was born and raised in Sutton, Surrey, while his paternal Grandfather was born in Darlington. Brody also has an older brother named Ryan who resides in Prince Rupert, British Columbia.
