= Andrew Lawrence (basketball) =

British basketball player

No. 4 – Surrey Scorchers
- Position: Point guard / shooting guard
- League: British Basketball League

Personal information
- Born: 4 June 1990 (age 36) London, England
- Listed height: 6 ft 1 in (1.85 m)
- Listed weight: 201 lb (91 kg)

Career information
- High school: St. John the Baptist School (Surrey, England)
- College: Charleston (2009–2013)
- NBA draft: 2013: undrafted
- Playing career: 2011–2024

Career history
- 2013–2014: Zadar
- 2015–2016: Gipuzkoa
- 2016: Prishtina
- 2016–2017: Châlons Reims
- 2017: Prishtina
- 2017–2018: Scafati
- 2018–2019: Latina Basket
- 2019–2020: London City Royals
- 2020–2021: Plymouth Raiders
- 2021-2026: Surrey Scorchers

Career highlights
- 2× Second team all-SoCon (2012, 2013)
- Stats at Basketball Reference

Andrew Derek Lawrence (born 4 June 1990) is a former British professional basketball player. Born in London, Lawrence played college basketball for Charleston, being named in the all-SoCon second team for two years in a row in 2012 and 2013. He represented Great Britain for a decade, including at the 2012 Summer Olympics, and retired from playing in 2026 after spending his final season with the Surrey 89ers of the UK's Super League Basketball.

== Personal ==
Lawrence is the son of Renaldo Lawrence who was drafted by the San Diego Clippers in the eighth round of the 1979 NBA draft. He is also the nephew of David Lawrence who played in the British Basketball League for six seasons. He attended St. John the Baptist secondary school (SJB) in Woking, Surrey.

== College career ==
In Andrew's freshman season at the College of Charleston, he appeared in all thirty-four games, averaging 4.7 points per game. On 30 January 2010 Andrew scored a season-high thirteen points against Georgia Southern University.

Andrew appeared in all thirty-six games his sophomore season, including two starts. He averaged 5.8 points, 1.8 rebounds, and 1.7 assists per game. Andrew also led the team in total steals, with thirty-seven.

In his junior season, Andrew averaged 13.0 points, 5.5 assists, 2.9 rebounds, and 1.9 steals per game. On 2 February 2012 Andrew scored a career high 32 points in a double-overtime loss to Elon. He was also named to the All-Southern Conference second team.

As a senior Lawrence was chosen for a second-straight year in the Second team of the Southern Conference.

== Professional career ==
Following graduation Andrew Lawrence was selected as a member of the Washington Wizards 2013 NBA Summer League squad averaging 5.8ppg, 1.8apg and 2.5rpg.

In September 2013, he signed with KK Zadar of Croatia for the 2013–14 season.

After being inactive during one entire season due to an injury, in July 2015 he signed with Spanish club Gipuzkoa Basket for the 2015–16 ACB season.

On 5 October 2016, Lawrence signed with Sigal Prishtina of Kosovo. On 12 December 2017, he left Prishtina and signed with French club Champagne Châlons-Reims Basket for the rest of the 2016–17 Pro A season.

On 11 September 2017, Lawrence signed with Sigal Prishtina, returning to the club for a second stint. On 7 December 2017, he left Prishtina and signed with Italian club Scafati Basket for the rest of the 2017–18 Serie A2 Basket.

In August 2019, Lawrence signed with London City Royals of the British Basketball League (BBL). On 24 September, Lawrence made his debut for the Royals, scoring 27 points and dishing out 9 assists in an away win over Plymouth Raiders. The City Royals folded midway the 2019–20 season. On 26 August 2020, Lawrence signed with Plymouth before completing his career with the Surrey Scorchers / 89ers where he transitioned onto the coaching staff.

== International ==
Andrew represented England at the 2008 Under-18 Division B European Championship. In the tournament, Andrew averaged 12.5 points, 5.7 rebounds, and 4.5 assists per game. He also participated in the 2009 Under-20 Division B European Championship and the 2010 Under-20 European Championship. Andrew made his first appearance for the Great Britain Men's National Team in an international test match against the Netherlands at ACS Cobham on 7 August 2011. He was then selected in the final 12 for FIBA EuroBasket 2011. Andrew was named to the Great Britain men's basketball team for teh London 2012 Olympics. In an exhibition game against the United States, Lawrence recorded six points, three rebounds, and three assists.
