= TrayVonn Wright =

American basketball player

No. 20 – Hemel Storm
- Position: Power forward
- League: NBL Division 1

Personal information
- Born: December 26, 1991 (age 34) Waterloo, Iowa
- Listed height: 6 ft 7 in (2.01 m)
- Listed weight: 180 lb (82 kg)

Career information
- High school: Waterloo West (Waterloo, Iowa)
- College: North Dakota State (2010–2014)
- NBA draft: 2014: undrafted
- Playing career: 2014–present

Career history
- 2014: WBC Raiffeisen Wels
- 2014–2016: Leicester Riders
- 2016–2017: Borås Basket
- 2017: Rethymno Cretan Kings
- 2017–2019: Leicester Riders
- 2019–2019: Hemel Storm
- 2020-present: Surrey Scorchers

Career highlights
- 2x British League champion (2016, (2018)); BBL Finals MVP (2018); 2x BBL All-Defensive First Team (2015, 2016); Summit League All-Second Team (2014)

TrayVonn Wright (born December 26, 1991) is an American professional basketball player for Surrey Scorchers in the British Basketball League. Standing at 2.01 m (6 ft 7 in), he plays the power forward position. After playing five years of college basketball at North Dakota State, Wright entered the 2014 NBA draft, but he was not selected in the draft's two rounds.

== High school career ==
Wright played high school basketball at Waterloo West High School in Waterloo, Iowa. He was a three-year starter and four-time all-conference performer, being named to the Class 4A all-state first team as a senior. He Averaged 14 points, 11 rebounds and three blocks per game and was named Mississippi Valley Conference West Division Player of the Year

== College career ==
As a freshman Wright played 29 games, producing 5.7 points and 3.4 rebounds per game with a total of 23 blocks. As a sophomore Wright played in 31 contests, and improved his numbers, averaging 7.7 points, 4.8 rebounds and 1.2 blocks per game, improving his playing time to 23.7 minutes per game. During the next two years, his number improved a lot and during his sophomore season, he went on to average 11.4 points, 5.2 rebounds and 1.7 blocks per game.

== Professional career ==
After going undrafted in the 2014 NBA draft, Wright joined WBC Raiffeisen Wels of the Austrian Basketball League. On December, he left the team and moved to Leicester Riders of the British Basketball League. He stayed at the club for two seasons and was included to the British Basketball League All-Defensive First Team twice.

On June 8, 2016, Wright joined Borås Basket of the Basketligan, being one of the top blockers of the league.

On June 14, 2017, he joined Rethymno Cretan Kings of the Greek Basket League. On November 7, 2017, he left Cretan Kings and returned to Leicester Riders of the British Basketball League after one year.

On January 31, 2019, he joined the Hemel Storm of the British NBL from the Leicester Riders and made his debut in an 85–79 victory against Team Newcastle on February 2, 2019.

On September 11, 2020, he joined the Surrey Scorchers of the British Basketball League.
