= Lovell Cook =

American basketball player

Personal information
- Born: August 1, 1990 (age 36) New Orleans, Louisiana, U.S.
- Listed height: 201 cm (6 ft 7 in)
- Listed weight: 98 kg (216 lb)

Career information
- High school: Warren Easton Charter (New Orleans, Louisiana)
- College: Gillette College (2009–2010); Northern Oklahoma–Enid (2010–2011); New Orleans (2011–2013)
- NBA draft: 2013: undrafted
- Playing career: 2014–2021
- Position: Shooting guard / small forward
- Number: 5, 6, 13

Career history
- 2014–2015: London Lions
- 2015: Gigantes Edomex Toluca
- 2016: Island Storm
- 2016: Bristol Flyers
- 2018: Portoviejo
- 2018: Atlético Nacional
- 2019–2021: Surrey Scorchers

Lovell Jireh Cook (born August 1, 1990) is an American former professional basketball player. He played two years of college basketball for the New Orleans Privateers.

== College career ==
Cook spent the first two years of his college career in the NJCAA, playing for Gillette College in 2009–10 and Northern Oklahoma–Enid in 2010–11. As a junior and senior, he played for the New Orleans Privateers. In 2011–12, he was the lone player on roster to play and start all 32 games. He averaged 14.0 points and 5.1 rebounds. As a senior in 2012–13, he averaged 14.2 points and 3.2 rebounds in 26 games.

== Professional career ==
=== London Lions (2014–2015) ===
On August 28, 2014, Cook signed with the London Lions in England for the 2014–15 BBL season. In 38 games, he averaged 15.2 points and 5.1 rebounds per game.

=== Mexico and Canada (2015–2016) ===
Cook started the 2015–16 season in Mexico with Gigantes Edomex Toluca but left in November 2015 after four games. He joined the Island Storm of NBL Canada in January 2016 but left after three games.

=== Bristol Flyers (2016–2017) ===
On July 20, 2016, Cook signed with the Bristol Flyers for the 2016–17 BBL season. He was released by the Flyers on November 21, 2016. In nine games, he averaged 9.9 points and 3.8 rebounds per game.

=== Ecuador and Panama (2018) ===
Between August and November 2018, Cook played in South America, first with Portoviejo in Ecuador and then Atlético Nacional in Panama.

=== Surrey Scorchers (2019–2021) ===
On December 4, 2019, Cook signed with the Surrey Scorchers for the rest of the 2019–20 BBL season. He averaged 19.3 points, 6.1 rebounds, 2.6 assists and 1.0 steal per game. On September 3, 2020, Cook re-signed with the Scorchers.
