= Buay Tuach =

Ethiopian-American basketball player

No. 5 – Otago Nuggets
- Position: Shooting guard / small forward
- League: NZNBL

Personal information
- Born: January 20, 1995 (age 31) Addis Ababa, Ethiopia
- Listed height: 6 ft 6 in (1.98 m)
- Listed weight: 185 lb (84 kg)

Career information
- High school: Omaha South (Omaha, Nebraska)
- College: Northeast CC (2013–2015); Loyola Marymount (2015–2017)
- NBA draft: 2017: undrafted
- Playing career: 2017–present

Career history
- 2017–2019: Westchester Knicks
- 2020: London Lions
- 2022–2024: South West Slammers
- 2024–2025: Trikala Basket
- 2025: Auckland Tuatara
- 2025: Correbasket UAT
- 2026–present: Otago Nuggets

Buay Tuach (born January 20, 1995) is an Ethiopian-American professional basketball player for the Otago Nuggets of the New Zealand National Basketball League (NZNBL).

== Career ==
=== Westchester Knicks (2017–2019) ===
After a short stint in Germany, Tuach was selected by the Long Island Nets in the 2017 NBA G League Draft. He was later waived and subsequently joined the Westchester Knicks. He averaged 2.0 points in 23 games during the 2017–18 season.

Tuach re-joined the Westchester Knicks for the 2018–19 season, but after appearing in two games, he sustained a foot fracture and was waived. He re-joined the Knicks in February 2019. He averaged 2.8 points in 13 games during the 2018–19 season.

=== London Lions (2020) ===
On January 10, 2020, Tuach signed with the London Lions in England for the 2019–20 BBL season. He averaged 10.1 points in nine games.

=== South West Slammers (2022–2024) ===
In March 2022, Tuach signed with the South West Slammers in Australia for the 2022 NBL1 West season. In 18 games, he averaged 21.89 points, 6.78 rebounds, 3.33 assists and 2.67 steals per game.

In October 2022, Tuach had a training camp stint with the Sioux Falls Skyforce of the NBA G League.

Tuach returned to the Slammers for the 2023 NBL1 West season and averaged 23.81 points, 6.43 rebounds, 3.86 and 1.9 steals in 21 games. With the Slammers in the 2024 NBL1 West season, he averaged 23.73 points, 7.55 rebounds, 3.14 assists and 2.64 steals in 22 games.

=== Trikala Basket (2024–2025) ===
In September 2024, Tuach signed with Trikala Basket of the Greek Elite League. In 15 games, he averaged 11.6 points, 2.5 rebounds and 2.7 assists per game.

=== Auckland Tuatara (2025) ===
On February 16, 2025, Tuach signed with the Auckland Tuatara of the New Zealand National Basketball League (NZNBL) for the 2025 season. In 22 games, he averaged 16.2 points, 4.8 rebounds, 2.2 assists and 1.3 steals per game.

=== Correbasket UAT (2025) ===
In August 2025, Tuach joined Correbasket UAT of the Mexican LNBP. He appeared in eight games between August 21 and September 14, averaging 3.4 points and 1.5 rebounds per game.

=== Otago Nuggets (2026–present) ===
In February 2026, Tuach signed with the Otago Nuggets for the 2026 New Zealand NBL season.
