= Justin Robinson (basketball, born 1987) =

British basketball player (born 1987)

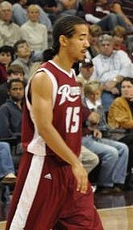
- Robinson in 2009.

No. 17 – Surrey Scorchers
- Position: Point guard / shooting guard
- League: British Basketball League

Personal information
- Born: 17 October 1987 (age 38) Brixton, London, England
- Listed height: 1.88 m (6 ft 2 in)
- Listed weight: 86 kg (190 lb)

Career information
- High school: Blair Academy (Blairstown, New Jersey)
- College: Rider (2007–2011)
- NBA draft: 2011: undrafted
- Playing career: 2011–present

Career history
- 2011: Maroussi
- 2011–2012: Apollon Limassol
- 2012–2013: BC Kyiv
- 2013: Uppsala Basket
- 2013–2014: Falco KC Szombathely
- 2014: Atomerőmű SE
- 2014–2015: Apollon Limassol
- 2015: Kolossos Rodou
- 2015–2016: Aries Trikala
- 2016–2017: Doxa Lefkadas
- 2017: Saint-Quentin
- 2017–2022: London Lions
- 2023–2024: Surrey Scorchers
- 2024-2025: London Cavaliers

Career highlights
- 2× BBL Most Valuable Player (2018, 2019); First-team All-BBL (2018); First-team All-MAAC (2011)

Justin Robinson (born 17 October 1987) is a British professional basketball player who plays for the London Cavaliers in the British NBL Division 1.

== Early life ==
Robinson played for the Brixton TopCats before moving to the United States to attend high school at the Blair Academy. As a junior, he would lead Blair to a Mid-Atlantic Prep League title and was named to the All-MAPL first team.

== College career ==
Robinson played college basketball for the Rider Broncs. During his senior year as team captain he averaged 15.3 points, 3.8 assist, 2.8 rebounds and 1.0 steal a game. He was named all MAAC first team, all Metro team and a runner-up for the MAAC player of the year award.

== Professional career ==
In September 2011, Robinson began his professional career with Greek team Maroussi. The next month he left Maroussi and moved to Apollon Limassol of the Cypriot League where he spent the 2011–12 season.

On 6 August 2012, he signed with BC Kyiv of Ukraine. On 26 February 2013, he parted ways with Kyiv. On 3 March 2013, he signed with Uppsala Basket of Sweden for the rest of the season.

During the 2013–14 season he played in Hungary with Falco KC Szombathely and Atomerőmű SE.

On 12 November 2014, he signed with his former team Apollon Limassol of Cyprus. On 25 February 2015, he left Apolon and signed with Kolossos Rodou of the Greek Basket League.

On 17 August 2016, Robinson signed with Slovenian club Union Olimpija. However, only twelve days later, he left the club before appearing in a game for them. On 20 September 2016, he signed with Greek club Doxa Lefkadas for the remainder of the season. He left Doxa after appearing in 19 games. On 16 March 2017, he signed with the French Pro B club Saint-Quentin for the rest of the season.

On 23 August 2017, Robinson signed with the London Lions of the British Basketball League.. In his first season he was named League MVP, averaging 17.8 and 5.6 assist per game. In 2019 Robinson won his second BBL MVP award in a row. He averaged 19.2 points and 5 assists per game during the 2019–20 season. The team would go on to win its first ever league and cup championship. On 13 July 2020 he signed a new 2-year deal with the London Lions.

== Career statistics ==
Year	Team	GP	GS	MPG	FG%	3P%	FT%	RPG	APG	SPG	BPG	PPG
2017–18	London Lions	30	29	29.4	48.5	45.8	83.5	3.1	5.6	1.8	0.1	17.8
2018–19	London Lions	31	31	32.0	41.7	36.9	86.9	3.5	4.9	1.4	0.0	19.2
2019–20	London Lions	13	13	32.1	42.1	33.3	87.5	3.4	4.8	1.4	0.0	16.2

== International ==
Robinson plays for the Great Britain national basketball team, making his debut against Poland in 2009.
