= Ashley Hamilton (basketball) =

English basketball player (born 1988)

No. 99 – Cáceres Ciudad del Baloncesto
- Position: Small forward / power forward
- League: LEB Oro

Personal information
- Born: 28 September 1988 (age 38) London, England
- Listed height: 6 ft 7 in (2.01 m)
- Listed weight: 210 lb (95 kg)

Career information
- High school: Lawrence Academy (Groton, Massachusetts)
- College: Loyola Marymount (2008–2013)
- NBA draft: 2013: undrafted
- Playing career: 2006–present

Career history
- 2006–2007: Gran Canaria
- 2007–2008: Tenefe Vecindario
- 2013: VL Pesaro
- 2013–2014: Viola Reggio Calabria
- 2014–2015: Cherkaski Monkeys
- 2015: Sagesse
- 2015: Olimpia Matera
- 2015–2017: Lavrio
- 2017–2018: Bàsquet Manresa
- 2018–2019: London City Royals
- 2019–2020: Básquet Coruña
- 2020–2021: Plymouth Raiders
- 2021–2022: Básquet Coruña
- 2022–2022: Montreal Alliance
- 2022–2023: Béliers de Kemper
- 2023: Brampton Honey Badgers
- 2023–present: Cáceres Ciudad del Baloncesto

Career highlights
- BBL Trophy MVP (2019); BBL Trophy winner (2019); WCC All-Freshman Team (2010)
Medals
Men's 3x3 basketball
Representing England
Commonwealth Games
Gold medal – first place	2026 Glasgow	Team

Ashley Georges Plummer Hamilton (born 28 September 1988) is a British professional basketball player for Cáceres Ciudad del Baloncesto of the Spanish LEB Oro and for the Great Britain men's national team. He played college basketball for Loyola Marymount.

== High school career ==
Hamilton played high school basketball at Lawrence Academy, in Groton, Massachusetts.

== College career ==
Hamilton started his career in Spain with Gran Canaria and Tenefe Vecindario. In 2008, he left Spain in order to play college basketball at Loyola Marymount University with the Loyola Marymount Lions. At the end of his senior season, Hamilton averaged 11.0 points, 5.6 rebounds, 0.68 steals and 0.64 assists per game in 22 games.

== Professional career ==
After going undrafted in the 2013 NBA draft, Hamilton joined VL Pesaro of the Serie A on 20 September 2013. He was waived after one month. Then, he signed with Viola Reggio Calabria for the rest of the season.

In 2014, he signed with Cherkaski Monkeys, and at the end of the season, he joined Sagesse for the Lebanese playoffs.

On 23 September 2015, Hamilton joined Olimpia Matera. He left the club on December and joined Lavrio of the Greek Basket League.

On 4 December 2019 he signed with Básquet Coruña of the LEB Oro. He averaged 11.8 points and 5.2 rebounds per game. On 1 September 2020, he has signed with Plymouth Raiders of the British Basketball League (BBL).

On 27 April 2022, Hamilton signed a contract with the Montreal Alliance of the Canadian Elite Basketball League (CEBL).

On 16 December 2023, Hamilton signed with Cáceres Ciudad del Baloncesto of the Spanish LEB Oro.

== National team career ==
Hamilton made his debut for the Great Britain Men's National Team on 21 July 2010 in an international test match against Canada at ACS Cobham. He scored a career high 13 points against Kosovo in FIBA EuroBasket 2022 Pre-Qualifiers in Manchester on 17 August 2019.
