= Brandon Peel =

American basketball player

Personal information
- Born: November 1, 1994 (age 31) Forestville, Maryland, U.S.
- Listed height: 201 cm (6 ft 7 in)
- Listed weight: 94 kg (207 lb)

Career information
- High school: Riverdale Baptist School (Upper Marlboro, Maryland)
- College: Central Connecticut (2012–2016)
- NBA draft: 2016: undrafted
- Playing career: 2017–present
- Position: Power forward

Career history
- 2016–2017: PG Valor
- 2017–2020: London Lions
- 2020–2021: Lahti
- 2021–2022: Newcastle Eagles
- 2022–2023: Ovarense Basquetebol

Career highlights
- BBL Cup MVP (2019); BBL champion (2019)

Brandon Peel (born November 1, 1994) is an American professional basketball player who last played for Ovarense Basquetebol of the Liga Portuguesa de Basquetebol (LPB). Peel played college basketball for the Central Connecticut Blue Devils. He entered the 2016 NBA draft but he was not selected in the draft's two rounds.

== College career ==
Peel played college basketball for the Central Connecticut Blue Devils. During his senior year, he averaged 11.7 points, 2.0 assist, 9.1 rebounds and 0.7 steal a game.

== Professional career ==
=== London Lions (2017–2020) ===
On September 6, 2017, Peel signed with the London Lions in England for the 2017–18 BBL season. In 33 games, he averaged 13.4 points, 9.3 rebounds, 1.8 assists and 1.1 blocks per game.

On July 16, 2018, Peel re-signed with London Lions on a two-year deal. Peel helped London win BBL Cup and its first regular season championship. He appeared in all 33 games in 2018–19, averaging 12.7 points, 7.6 rebounds and 1.5 assists per game.

=== Lahti (2020–2021) ===
On May 20, 2020, Peel signed with Lahti in the Finnish Korisliiga.

=== Newcastle Eagles (2021–2022) ===
On November 2, 2021, Peel returned to England and signed with the Newcastle Eagles for the 2021–22 BBL season.

== Career statistics ==
Legend
GP	Games played	GS	Games started	MPG	Minutes per game
FG%	Field goal percentage	3P%	3-point field goal percentage	FT%	Free throw percentage
RPG	Rebounds per game	APG	Assists per game	SPG	Steals per game
BPG	Blocks per game	PPG	Points per game	**Bold**	Career high

=== College statistics ===
Year	Team	GP	GS	MPG	FG%	3P%	FT%	RPG	APG	SPG	BPG	PPG
2012–13	Central Connecticut	28	14	19.5	.505	0.00	.627	5.5	0.5	0.5	0.6	4.4
2013–14	Central Connecticut	30	24	23.0	**.546**	0.00	.714	6.3	0.7	0.7	**2.0**	7.1
2014–15	Central Connecticut	**31**	**31**	33.1	.468	**.364**	.614	8.8	1.0	**0.8**	1.7	9.1
2015–16	Central Connecticut	29	29	**29.7**	.442	0.00	**.777**	**9.1**	**2.0**	0.7	1.3	**11.7**
Career		118	98	26.5	.479	.267	.704	7.5	1.1	0.7	1.4	8.1

=== BBL statistics ===
†	Denotes seasons in which Peel won a BBL Championship

Year	Team	GP	GS	MPG	FG%	3P%	FT%	RPG	APG	SPG	BPG	PPG
2017–18	London Lions	**33**	20	25.3	**57.5**	**37.5**	77.2	**9.3**	**1.8**	**1.4**	**1.1**	**13.4**
2018–19†	London Lions	**33**	**33**	26.5	46.4	**37.5**	**81.0**	7.6	1.5	1.0	0.9	12.7
2019–20	London Lions	14	14	**26.8**	48.0	31.9	70.7	8.9	1.6	0.9	0.4	**13.4**
Career		80	67	26.2	50.6	35.6	76.3	8.6	1.6	1.1	0.8	13.2

Source: Brandon Peel statistics
