= 2017–18 British Basketball League season =

2017–18 BBL season
- League: British Basketball League
- Season: 2017–18
- Duration: 29 September 2017 – 29 April 2018 (Regular season); 4–20 May 2018 (Playoffs)
- Games played: 198
- Teams: 12
- TV partners: BBC Sport; FreeSports; UNILAD; LiveBasketball.TV

Regular season
- League champions: Leicester Riders
- Season MVP: Justin Robinson (London Lions)

Finals
- Champions: Leicester Riders
- Runners-up: London Lions
- Finals MVP: TrayVonn Wright (Leicester Riders)

Records
- Biggest home win: 56 points; Glasgow Rocks 118–62 Manchester Giants; (6 October 2017); Worcester Wolves 122–66 Leeds Force; (15 December 2017)
- Biggest away win: 88 points; Leeds Force 60–148 Newcastle Eagles; (29 September 2017)
- Highest scoring: 223 points; Newcastle Eagles 119–104 Glasgow Rocks; (6 October 2017)

BBL seasons
- ← 2016–17 2018–19 →

The 2017–18 BBL season was the 31st campaign of the British Basketball League since the league's establishment in 1987. The season featured 12 teams from across England and Scotland.

The Leicester Riders became regular season champions for the third season in succession, winning 104–75 against Plymouth Raiders at the Plymouth Pavilions on 8 April 2018. The Riders then added the playoff title with an 81–60 win over the London Lions in the final. This victory gave Rob Paternostro's team a second consecutive treble, having won the BBL Trophy earlier in the campaign.

== Teams ==
Locations of the 2017–18 BBL teams

=== Venues ===
Team	Location	Arena	Capacity
Bristol Flyers	Bristol	SGS WISE Arena	750
Cheshire Phoenix	Ellesmere Port	Cheshire Oaks Arena	1,400
Glasgow Rocks	Glasgow	Emirates Arena	6,500
Leeds Force	Leeds	Carnegie Sports Arena	500
Leicester Riders	Leicester	Leicester Arena	2,400
London Lions	London	Copper Box	7,000
Manchester Giants	Manchester	Trafford Powerleague Arena	1,100
Newcastle Eagles	Newcastle upon Tyne	Sport Central	3,000
Plymouth Raiders	Plymouth	Plymouth Pavilions	1,500
Sheffield Sharks	Sheffield	English Institute of Sport	1,000
Surrey Scorchers	Guildford	Surrey Sports Park	1,000
Worcester Wolves	Worcester	University of Worcester Arena	2,000

=== Personnel and sponsoring ===
Team	Head coach	Captain	Main jersey sponsor
Bristol Flyers	(Greece) Andreas Kapoulas	(Scotland) Michael Vigor	RSG Group
Cheshire Phoenix	(England) Ben Thomas	(England) Orlan Jackman	Hillyer McKeown
Glasgow Rocks	(Scotland) Darryl Wood	(Scotland) Kieron Achara	The Forge Shopping Centre
Leeds Force	(Republic of Ireland) Danny Nelson	(England) Isaac Mourier	ESH Group
Leicester Riders	(United States) Rob Paternostro	(United States) Tyler Bernardini	Jelson Homes
London Lions	(England) Vince Macaulay	(England) Joe Ikhinmwin	GLL
Manchester Giants	(England) Danny Byrne	(England) Callum Jones	University of Bolton
Newcastle Eagles	(England) Fabulous Flournoy	(England) Darius Defoe	ESH Group
Plymouth Raiders	(England) Gavin Love	(England) Zak Wells	Plessey
Sheffield Sharks	(United States) Atiba Lyons	(England) Mike Tuck	BBraun
Surrey Scorchers	(Zimbabwe) Creon Raftopoulos	(England) Tayo Ogedengbe	University of Surrey
Worcester Wolves	(England) Paul James	(Spain) Alejandro Navajas	University of Worcester

=== Coaching changes ===
Team	Outgoing coach	Manner of departure	Date of vacancy	Incoming coach	Date of appointment
Leeds Force	(Finland) Mika Turunen	Sacked	25 September 2017	(Republic of Ireland) Danny Nelson	25 September 2017
London Lions	(Poland) Mariusz Karol	Mutual consent	5 January 2018	(England) Vince Macaulay	5 January 2018
Glasgow Rocks	(England) Tony Garbelotto	Personal reasons	19 February 2018	(Scotland) Darryl Wood	19 February 2018

== Regular season ==
=== Standings ===
Pos	Team	Pld	W	L	PF	PA	PD	Pts	Qualification
1	Leicester Riders	33	28	5	2933	2479	+454	56	Qualification to playoffs
2	London Lions	33	23	10	2854	2480	+374	46	Qualification to playoffs
3	Newcastle Eagles	33	22	11	3023	2624	+399	44	Qualification to playoffs
4	Glasgow Rocks	33	21	12	2894	2693	+201	42	Qualification to playoffs
5	Surrey Scorchers	33	20	13	2876	2807	+69	40	Qualification to playoffs
6	Bristol Flyers	33	19	14	2673	2680	−7	38	Qualification to playoffs
7	Worcester Wolves	33	19	14	2933	2690	+243	38	Qualification to playoffs
8	Sheffield Sharks	33	18	15	2783	2648	+135	36	Qualification to playoffs
9	Cheshire Phoenix	33	15	18	2863	2861	+2	30	
10	Plymouth Raiders	33	8	25	2723	2952	−229	16	
11	Manchester Giants	33	4	29	2584	3134	−550	8	
12	Leeds Force	33	1	32	2322	3413	−1091	2	

Source: BBL

== Playoffs ==
=== Bracket ===
Quarter-finals
1	Leicester Riders	86	79	165
8	Sheffield Sharks	73	67	140
3	Newcastle Eagles	97	60	157
6	Bristol Flyers	86	77	163
4	Glasgow Rocks	82	99	181
5	Surrey Scorchers	84	75	159
2	London Lions	85	94	179
7	Worcester Wolves	84	90	174

Semi-finals
1	Leicester Riders	90	76	166
6	Bristol Flyers	75	68	143
4	Glasgow Rocks	78	77	155
2	London Lions	78	91	169

Final
1	Leicester Riders	81
2	London Lions	60

=== Quarter-finals ===
The quarter-final matchups and tip-off times were confirmed by the league, on 30 April 2018.

==== (1) Leicester Riders vs. (8) Sheffield Sharks ====
5 May 2018
16:00

Report

Sheffield Sharks	73–86	Leicester Riders
Scoring by quarter: 23–18, 18–22, 18–19, 14–27
Pts: Chris Alexander (24); Rebs: Tony Wroblicky (7); Asts: Mackey McKnight (11)		Pts: Pierre Hampton (22); Rebs: Shane Walker (13); Asts: Rema Lascelles (7)

English Institute of Sport, Sheffield

6 May 2018
16:00

Report

Leicester Riders	79–67	Sheffield Sharks
Scoring by quarter: 26–16, 16–19, 20–18, 17–14
Pts: J. R. Holder (20); Rebs: Shane Walker (10); Asts: J. R. Holder (5)		Pts: Dirk Williams (17); Rebs: Rob Marsden (12); Asts: Mackey McKnight (4)
Leicester Riders win 165–140 on aggregate.

Leicester Arena, Leicester

==== (2) London Lions vs. (7) Worcester Wolves ====
BBC Red Button

4 May 2018
19:30

Report

Worcester Wolves	84–85	London Lions
Scoring by quarter: 13–27, 26–25, 25–24, 20–9
Pts: George Beamon (25); Rebs: Dallin Bachynski (10); Asts: Trayvon Palmer (8)		Pts: Justin Robinson (28); Rebs: Cory Dixon (7); Asts: Jonathon Thompson (5)

University of Worcester Arena, Worcester

6 May 2018
16:00

Report

London Lions	94–90 (2OT)	Worcester Wolves
Scoring by quarter: 18–14, 24–23, 20–24, 16–18, Overtime: 8–8, 8–3
Pts: Cory Dixon (29); Rebs: Cory Dixon (17); Asts: Jonathon Thompson (7)		Pts: George Beamon (26); Rebs: Dallin Bachynski (16); Asts: Alejandro Navajas (6)
London Lions win 179–174 on aggregate.

Copper Box Arena, London

==== (3) Newcastle Eagles vs. (6) Bristol Flyers ====
4 May 2018
19:30

Report

Newcastle Eagles	97–86	Bristol Flyers
Scoring by quarter: 24–16, 19–25, 25–15, 29–30
Pts: Darius Defoe (25); Rebs: Zarko Jukić (10); Asts: Saah Nimley (12)		Pts: Rohndell Goodwin (20); Rebs: Jordan Davis (9); Asts: Jordan Davis (9)

Sport Central, Newcastle upon Tyne

6 May 2018
15:30

Report

Bristol Flyers	77–60	Newcastle Eagles
Scoring by quarter: 19–19, 20–14, 19–10, 19–17
Pts: Jordan Davis (17); Rebs: Leslee Smith (14); Asts: Jordan Davis (9)		Pts: Darius Defoe (23); Rebs: Darius Defoe (13); Asts: Fabulous Flournoy (5)
Bristol Flyers win 163–157 on aggregate.

SGS WISE Arena, Bristol

==== (4) Glasgow Rocks vs. (5) Surrey Scorchers ====
4 May 2018
19:30

Report

Surrey Scorchers	84–82	Glasgow Rocks
Scoring by quarter: 23–23, 20–25, 13–16, 28–18
Pts: Tony Hicks (30); Rebs: Josh Steel (5); Asts: Tony Hicks (7)		Pts: Earl Brown (13); Rebs: Earl Brown (10); Asts: Warren Gillis (8)

Surrey Sports Park, Guildford

FreeSports

6 May 2018
17:00

Report

Glasgow Rocks	99–75	Surrey Scorchers
Scoring by quarter: 26–19, 23–19, 24–15, 26–22
Pts: Earl Brown (23); Rebs: Earl Brown (14); Asts: Kieron Achara, Earl Brown & Gareth Murray (3)		Pts: Alex Owumi (13); Rebs: Alex Owumi (6); Asts: Tayo Ogedengbe (4)
Glasgow Rocks win 181–159 on aggregate.

Emirates Arena, Glasgow

=== Semi-finals ===
The semi-final matchups and tip-off times were confirmed by the league, on 6 May 2018.

==== (1) Leicester Riders vs. (6) Bristol Flyers ====
11 May 2018
19:30

Report

Bristol Flyers	75–90	Leicester Riders
Scoring by quarter: 22–25, 18–20, 11–24, 24–21
Pts: Rohndell Goodwin (19); Rebs: Leslee Smith (10); Asts: Jordan Davis (9)		Pts: J. R. Holder (20); Rebs: J. R. Holder (11); Asts: Rema Lascelles (6)

SGS WISE Arena, Bristol
Attendance: 700

FreeSports

13 May 2018
17:00

Report

Leicester Riders	76–68	Bristol Flyers
Scoring by quarter: 22–16, 11–25, 20–11, 23–16
Pts: Tyler Bernardini (22); Rebs: J. R. Holder (10); Asts: Kiefer Douse (7)		Pts: Brandon Boggs (19); Rebs: Brandon Boggs (8); Asts: Jordan Davis (7)
Leicester Riders win 166–143 on aggregate.

Leicester Arena, Leicester

==== (2) London Lions vs. (4) Glasgow Rocks ====
BBC Red Button

10 May 2018
19:30

Report

London Lions	78–78	Glasgow Rocks
Scoring by quarter: 28–11, 18–25, 11–20, 21–22
Pts: Cory Dixon (18); Rebs: Cory Dixon (11); Asts: Justin Robinson (8)		Pts: Warren Gillis (15); Rebs: Gareth Murray (9); Asts: Nate Britt (5)

Copper Box Arena, London

13 May 2018
17:00

Report

Glasgow Rocks	77–91	London Lions
Scoring by quarter: 16–26, 15–18, 18–19, 28–28
Pts: Gareth Murray (18); Rebs: Alasdair Fraser (9); Asts: Warren Gillis (5)		Pts: Jonathon Thompson (17); Rebs: Cory Dixon & Brandon Peel (8); Asts: Jonathon Thompson (5)
London Lions win 169–155 on aggregate.

Emirates Arena, Glasgow

=== Final ===
- BBC Red Button
- FreeSports

20 May 2018
16:00

Report

Leicester Riders	81–60	London Lions
Scoring by quarter: 12–14, 27–14, 19–15, 23–17
Pts: J. R. Holder (20); Rebs: TrayVonn Wright (13); Asts: Tyler Bernardini & J. R. Holder (5)		Pts: Brandon Peel (22); Rebs: Brandon Peel (13); Asts: Justin Robinson (5)

The O2 Arena, London

== Awards ==
=== Monthly awards ===
Month	Coach of the Month	Player of the Month	Ref
October	(United States) Atiba Lyons (Sheffield Sharks)	(Puerto Rico) Jaysean Paige (Newcastle Eagles)	
November	(Poland) Mariusz Karol (London Lions)	(United States) C. J. Gettys (Cheshire Phoenix)	
December	(United States) Rob Paternostro (Leicester Riders)	(United States) C. J. Gettys (Cheshire Phoenix)	
January	(United Kingdom) Ben Thomas (Cheshire Phoenix)	(United States) Cory Dixon (London Lions)	
February	(United States) Rob Paternostro (Leicester Riders)	(United States) Tony Hicks (Surrey Scorchers)	
March	(United States) Rob Paternostro (Leicester Riders)	(United States) Tony Hicks (Surrey Scorchers)	
April	(United Kingdom) Vince Macaulay (London Lions)	(United States) Brandon Peel (London Lions)	

=== Season awards ===
Award	Recipient(s)	Team	Ref
Season MVP	(United Kingdom) Justin Robinson	London Lions	
Coach of the Year	(United States) Rob Paternostro	Leicester Riders	
Finals MVP	(United States) TrayVonn Wright	Leicester Riders	
Trophy MVP	(United States) J. R. Holder	Leicester Riders	
Cup MVP	(United States) Malcolm Riley	Cheshire Phoenix	
BBL Team of the Year	(United States) C. J. Gettys	Cheshire Phoenix	
BBL Team of the Year	(Sweden) Pierre Hampton	Leicester Riders	
BBL Team of the Year	(United States) Tony Hicks	Surrey Scorchers	
BBL Team of the Year	(Puerto Rico) Jaysean Paige	Newcastle Eagles	
BBL Team of the Year	(United Kingdom) Justin Robinson	London Lions	
BBL All-Defensive Team of the Year	(United Kingdom) Kieron Achara	Glasgow Rocks	
BBL All-Defensive Team of the Year	(United Kingdom) Devan Bailey	Cheshire Phoenix	
BBL All-Defensive Team of the Year	(United Kingdom) Robert Gilchrist	Worcester Wolves	
BBL All-Defensive Team of the Year	(United States) Brandon Peel	London Lions	
BBL All-Defensive Team of the Year	(United States) Eric Robertson	Leicester Riders	
BBL All-British Team of the Year	Kieron Achara	Glasgow Rocks	
BBL All-British Team of the Year	Alasdair Fraser	Glasgow Rocks	
BBL All-British Team of the Year	Robert Gilchrist	Worcester Wolves	
BBL All-British Team of the Year	Gareth Murray	Glasgow Rocks	
BBL All-British Team of the Year	Justin Robinson	London Lions	

== See also ==
- 2017–18 BBL Cup
- 2017–18 BBL Trophy

Preceded by 2016–17 season	BBL seasons 2017–18	Succeeded by 2018–19 season
