= London City Royals =

- League: BBL
- Established: 2018
- Folded: 2020
- History: London City Royals (2018–2020)
- Arena: Crystal Palace NSC
- Capacity: 1,500
- Location: Crystal Palace, London
- Championships: 1 BBL Trophy
- Website: Official website

The London City Royals were a British professional basketball team, based in the Crystal Palace area of London, England. The team was founded in 2018, however despite big ambitions the team ceased trading less than two years later, during the 2019–20 season.

== History ==
The team was established in July 2018 by businessman Jon Sawyer and London based basketball promoter Nhamo Shire, founder of the London School of Basketball. Following the withdrawal of Leeds Force earlier in the summer, the Royals became the 12th member of the league and the second London based franchise along with London Lions, with the Royals being based at Lions' former home venue, the Crystal Palace National Sports Centre.

In its inaugural season, the Royals invested heavily in a playing roster that included Great Britain internationals Matthew Bryan-Amaning and Ashley Hamilton. The team was led by former BBL player Jay Williams, secured their first silverware early in the club's fledgling existence, winning the BBL Trophy after defeating city rivals London Lions 90–82 in the first ever BBL final to be decided after overtime. Overall, the star-studded team's fortunes were mixed, with a First Round cup exit to Worcester Wolves, and a fourth place finish in the league, before losing out comfortably in the Playoff final to Leicester Riders.

The club announced midway through the 2019–20 season it would cease to operate with immediate effect, pending liquidation.

== Honours ==
- BBL Trophy Winners: 2018–19 (1)

== Home arena ==
- Crystal Palace National Sports Centre (2018–2020)

== Players ==
=== Final roster ===
Note: Flags indicate national team, as has been defined under FIBA eligibility rules. Players may hold more than one non-FIBA nationality.

No.	Pos.	Nat.	Player
1	SF	(United Kingdom) GBR	Will Saunders
3	G	(United States) USA	Matt Scott
4	PG	(United Kingdom) GBR	Andrew Lawrence
5	G/F	(United Kingdom) GBR	Kyle Carey
6	G	(Angola) ANG	Edmir Lucas
13	SF	(United Kingdom) GBR	Orlan Jackman
15	F/C	(United Kingdom) GBR	Will Neighbour
22	SF	(United Kingdom) GBR	Abraham Ekperuoh
35	PG	(Albania) ALB	Elvisi Dusha

=== Notable former players ===
Note: Flags indicate national team eligibility at FIBA-sanctioned events. Players may hold other non-FIBA nationalities not displayed.

Criteria

To appear in this section a player must have either:

- Set a club record or won an individual award while at the club
- Played at least one official international match for their national team at any time
- Played at least one official NBA match at any time.

- (United Kingdom) Matthew Bryan-Amaning
- (United Kingdom) Ashley Hamilton
- (United Kingdom) Jules Dang Akodo
- (United Kingdom) Andrew Lawrence
- (United Kingdom) Will Saunders
- (Lithuania) Darjuš Lavrinovič
- (Lithuania) Kšyštof Lavrinovič
- (Albania) Elvisi Dusha
- (United States) Matt Scott

== Season-by-season records ==
Season	Division	Tier	Regular Season						Post-Season	Trophy	Cup	Head coach
Season	Division	Tier	Finish	Played	Wins	Losses	Points	Win %	Post-Season	Trophy	Cup	Head coach
London City Royals
2018–19	BBL	1	4th	33	18	15	36	0.545	Runners-Up, losing to Leicester	Winners, beating London, 90–82 (OT)	1st Round (BC)	Jay Williams
2019–20	BBL	1	Withdrew from league								Semi Finals (BC)	Lloyd Gardner

== See also ==
- British Basketball League
- London Lions
- London Towers
- Crystal Palace
