= Bristol Metropolitan Academy =

Location
- Snowdon Road; Bristol, BS16 2HD; England; 51.4805°N 2.5392°W

Information
- Type: Secondary Academy
- Established: 2009
- Trust: Cabot Learning Federation
- Department for Education URN: 135959 Tables
- Ofsted: Reports
- Principal: Kris Bridgeman
- Vice Principal: Natasha Williams
- Gender: Mixed
- Age: 11 to 16
- Enrolment: 1000 (Data from January 2024)
- Capacity: 1200 (Data from January 2024)
- Houses: Enterprise, Performance, Communication, Discovery
- Website: http://www.bristolmet.bristol.sch.uk/

Bristol Metropolitan Academy, formerly Whitefield Fishponds Community School and later Bristol Metropolitan College, is an academy in Fishponds, Bristol, England.

== History ==
The original school building was built in 1836 by the architect Charles Dyer but was rebuilt after its destruction by German bombs during the second world war, and was replaced in 2008 with a new building on the same site and became an academy from the beginning of the 2009–2010 school year.

In 2003, Briarfield (a specialist school for children with disabilities) was built in Whitefield's grounds, and later a City Learning Centre (CLC3) was constructed adjacent to Briarfield. The CLC housed equipment designed for work with media projects. The CLC3 site has now closed, although the building remains.

During 2005, Whitefield Fishponds Community School was given Language College status. It is one of the few schools in Bristol to have been awarded this. The status recognises that Whitefield excels in the teaching of foreign languages to the local community.

The focus of the school is the central street, which is designed to be the heart of the school, providing a place for social interaction between students and staff and to give the school a sense of identity and drama. The environmental aspects of the school were also critical; maximisation of natural daylight, use of natural ventilation, recycling of rainwater for use in toilets and the use of biomass, recycled timber waste, to generate heat and power.

The school was designed collaboratively by the architects, an educationalist and also the school itself.

At one time, Whitefield School had four sites - Whitefield Lower Mixed, the lower mixed-sex site located in Alexandra Park in Fishponds,(subsequently an Adult Education Centre), Whitefield Lower Girls on Fishponds Road, Eastville (subsequently demolished for housing) and Whitefield Lower Boys located at Greenbank. Students 11-13 spent the first three years at one of the lower schools, before transferring to the Whitefield Fishponds Upper School, adjacent to the current site of the Bristol Metropolitan College, for years 14-18 (or Sixth Form as the last two years of school were then known).

=== Building ===
In 2006 construction began on a new school building, on the existing site, and by summer 2007 the exterior construction was finished, with the interior fitting of the school and the landscaping of grounds to be completed. The old school buildings have been demolished, however Briarfield and CLC3 remained, and the new school building opened in May 2008.

Bristol Metropolitan College was the second school in Bristol to be completed under the Building Schools for the Future programme. Designed by Wilkinson Eyre Architects, it uses the exemplar Learning Cluster, or "strawberries" are they are affectionately known, first used at the John Madjeski Academy in Reading.

== Academic achievement ==
The school has improved its results year on year and achieved its best ever GCSE scores in 2014, the table below shows the percentage of students hitting the key measure of 5 A*-C including English and Mathematics.

| 2008 | 2009 | 2010 | 2011 | 2012 | 2013 | 2014 | 2015 | 2016 | 2017 |
|---|---|---|---|---|---|---|---|---|---|
| N/A | N/A | 39% | 42% | 34% | 47% | 54% | 47% | 52% | 49% |

In 2014 it had the third highest value added score in the country, meaning that irrespective of starting point, students made exceptional progress in English, maths and across the curriculum.

== Ofsted inspection ==
The school's latest inspection took place on 3 and 4 July 2024 and it received the following grades:

| Area | Grade |
|---|---|
| Overall Effectiveness | 2 - Good |
| Quality of Education | 1 - Outstanding |
| Behaviour and Attitudes | 2 - Good |
| Personal Development | 2 - Good |
| Leadership And Management | 1 - Outstanding |

In the school's previous Ofsted inspection, Bristol Metropolitan Academy achieved a grade of good.
