= 2018–19 British Basketball League season =

2018–19 BBL season
- League: British Basketball League
- Season: 2018–19
- Games played: 198
- Teams: 12

Regular season
- League champions: London Lions (1st title)
- BBL Cup: London Lions (2nd title)
- BBL Trophy: London City Royals (1st title)
- Season MVP: Justin Robinson (London Lions)

Playoffs
- Champions: Leicester Riders (5th title)
- Runners-up: London City Royals (1st title)
- Finals MVP: Tim Williams (Leicester Riders)

Statistical leaders
Points	Chris Alexander (Sharks); (626 points)	Rashad Hassan (Raiders); (20.04 PPG)
Rebounds	Willie Clayton (Giants); (481 rebounds)	Willie Clayton (Giants); (15.03 RPG)
Assists	Rahmon Fletcher (Eagles); (286 assists)	Rahmon Fletcher (Eagles); (8.94 APG)

Records
- Biggest home win: 51 points; Riders 121–70 Wolves; (20 April 2019)
- Biggest away win: 29 points; Sharks 72–101 Giants; (30 December 2018); Sharks 56–85 Raiders; (5 April 2019)
- Highest scoring: 302 points (Note: The 302 points in this game was a British Basketball League record, and was only the fifth game, at that time, to go to quadruple overtime.); Wolves 152–150 Scorchers; (5 April 2019)
- Winning streak: 11 games; London Lions; (14 December 2018 – 22 March 2019)
- Losing streak: 18 games; Worcester Wolves; (23 September 2018 – 3 February 2019)

BBL seasons
- ← 2017–18 2019–20 →

The 2018–19 BBL season was the 32nd campaign of the British Basketball League since the league's establishment in 1987. The season featured 12 teams from across England and Scotland.

The Leicester Riders were the three-time defending regular season champions, but were unable to defend that title as the London Lions achieved their first regular season title; a 99–80 victory at the Newcastle Eagles, on 26 April 2019, was enough for the Lions to have an unassailable lead ahead of the Riders. It was the Lions' second trophy of the season, after they defeated the Glasgow Rocks in the BBL Cup final.

The Lions were beaten in the playoff quarter-finals by the eighth-seeded Plymouth Raiders, who overturned a six-point deficit from the first leg into an eight-point aggregate victory. The Raiders were then beaten by the Riders in the semi-finals, before the Riders won their third consecutive playoff final with a 93–61 victory over the London City Royals, who in their first season in the league, had won the BBL Trophy in overtime against the Lions.

== Teams ==
Locations of the 2018–19 BBL teams

The newly formed London City Royals replaced Leeds Force.

=== Venues ===
Team	Location	Arena	Capacity
Bristol Flyers	Bristol	SGS WISE Arena	750
Cheshire Phoenix	Ellesmere Port	Cheshire Oaks Arena	1,400
Glasgow Rocks	Glasgow	Emirates Arena	1,650
Leicester Riders	Leicester	Morningside Arena	2,400
London City Royals	London	Crystal Palace NSC	1,500
London Lions	London	Copper Box	7,000
Manchester Giants	Manchester	Trafford Powerleague Arena; George H. Carnall Centre	1,100; 750
Newcastle Eagles	Newcastle upon Tyne	Sport Central; Eagles Community Arena	3,000; 3,000
Plymouth Raiders	Plymouth	Plymouth Pavilions	1,500
Sheffield Sharks	Sheffield	English Institute of Sport	1,000
Surrey Scorchers	Guildford	Surrey Sports Park	1,000
Worcester Wolves	Worcester	University of Worcester Arena	2,000

=== Personnel and sponsoring ===
Team	Head coach	Captain	Main jersey sponsor
Bristol Flyers	(Greece) Andreas Kapoulas	(Australia) Michael Vigor	RSG Group
Cheshire Phoenix	(England) Ben Thomas	(Serbia) Momcilo Latinovic	Hillyer McKeown
Glasgow Rocks	(France) Vincent Lavandier	(Scotland) Kieron Achara	Radisson Red
Leicester Riders	(United States) Rob Paternostro	(England) Andrew Thomson	Jelson Homes
London City Royals	(England) Jay Williams	(England) Orlan Jackman	
London Lions	(England) Vince Macaulay	(England) Joe Ikhinmwin	
Manchester Giants	(England) Danny Byrne	(England) Callum Jones	Space
Newcastle Eagles	(United States) Fabulous Flournoy	(England) Darius Defoe	ESH Group
Plymouth Raiders	(England) Paul James	(England) Zak Wells	Plessey
Sheffield Sharks	(United States) Atiba Lyons	(Canada) Mike Tuck	BBraun
Surrey Scorchers	(Zimbabwe) Creon Raftopoulos	(England) Tayo Ogedengbe	University of Surrey
Worcester Wolves	(England) Tony Garbelotto	(Australia) Adam Thoseby	University of Worcester

=== Coaching changes ===
Team	Outgoing coach	Manner of departure	Date of vacancy	Incoming coach	Date of appointment
Worcester Wolves	(England) Paul James	Released	Off-season	(United States) Ty Shaw	
Plymouth Raiders	(England) Gavin Love	Released	Off-season	(England) Paul James	
Glasgow Rocks	(Scotland) Darryl Wood	Mutual consent	19 February 2019	(France) Vincent Lavandier (interim)	28 February 2019
Worcester Wolves	(United States) Ty Shaw	Personal reasons	8 March 2019	(England) Tony Garbelotto (interim)	8 March 2019 (Note: Ty Shaw was taken ill at an 11 January game against the Sheffield Sharks. On 31 January, Tony Garbelotto was named interim head coach while Shaw recovered, and remained in interim charge after Shaw's departure on 8 March.)

== Regular season ==
The winners of the Regular season are considered as national champions. The London Lions achieved their first regular season title with a 99–80 victory over the Newcastle Eagles at the Eagles Community Arena on 26 April 2019.

=== Standings ===
Pos	Team	Pld	W	L	PF	PA	PD	Pts	Qualification
1	London Lions (C)	33	27	6	2879	2525	+354	54	Qualification to playoffs
2	Leicester Riders	33	24	9	2674	2517	+157	48	Qualification to playoffs
3	Newcastle Eagles	33	21	12	2930	2821	+109	42	Qualification to playoffs
4	London City Royals	33	18	15	2800	2800	0	36	Qualification to playoffs
5	Glasgow Rocks	33	18	15	2789	2716	+73	36	Qualification to playoffs
6	Sheffield Sharks	33	17	16	2580	2618	−38	34	Qualification to playoffs
7	Cheshire Phoenix	33	17	16	2862	2822	+40	34	Qualification to playoffs
8	Plymouth Raiders	33	16	17	2898	2878	+20	32	Qualification to playoffs
9	Manchester Giants	33	14	19	2842	2947	−105	28	
10	Bristol Flyers	33	14	19	2613	2653	−40	28	
11	Worcester Wolves	33	6	27	2744	3047	−303	12	
12	Surrey Scorchers	33	6	27	2883	3150	−267	12	

Source: BBL
(C) Champions

=== Results ===
==== Double round-robin ====
Home \ Away	BRI	CHE	GLA	LEI	LCI	LON	MAN	NEW	PLY	SHE	SUR	WOR
Bristol Flyers	—	63–68	85–83	52–68	73–78	80–64	89–92	86–73	80–70	92–60	83–89	82–79
Cheshire Phoenix	87–93	—	87–92	88–94	98–86	94–101	102–80	78–90	94–88	61–78	93–74	91–83
Radisson Red Glasgow Rocks	99–82	101–96	—	101–81	98–81	70–86	80–69	85–100	72–77	85–94	103–76	89–61
Leicester Riders	64–63	76–79	75–71	—	83–79	73–76	94–68	69–76	86–77	70–71	87–81	94–86
London City Royals	91–83	93–99	84–70	77–74	—	77–73	97–90	98–81	102–93	83–70	91–85	79–66
London Lions	81–68	87–81	100–66	63–65	80–63	—	115–91	96–78	99–92	92–82	93–79	82–65
Manchester Giants	79–69	99–91	76–83	75–73	86–92	83–86	—	76–75	89–99	93–65	93–109	124–123
Esh Group Eagles Newcastle	95–89	70–65	104–98	68–84	110–60	80–99	93–85	—	86–91	72–76	114–82	97–89
Plymouth Raiders	94–91	94–79	87–83	87–90	84–77	95–88	104–78	85–103	—	57–66	115–100	74–91
DBL Sharks Sheffield	86–66	84–66	99–87	69–90	88–93	73–80	87–92	86–74	66–83	—	99–90	114–76
Surrey Scorchers	90–76	94–116	92–94	79–84	93–91	83–96	78–105	89–93	98–112	83–93	—	99–86
Worcester Wolves	77–80	78–88	74–72	80–85	75–91	63–71	86–92	92–103	93–81	67–89	84–79	—

Legend: Blue = home team win; Red = away team win.

==== Single round-robin ====
Home \ Away	BRI	CHE	GLA	LEI	LCI	LON	MAN	NEW	PLY	SHE	SUR	WOR
Bristol Flyers	—	—	—	83–90	83–84	—	74–64	—	95–79	62–61	80–73	—
Cheshire Phoenix	75–87	—	—	—	88–82	—	—	—	89–84	80–73	—	100–83
Radisson Red Glasgow Rocks	113–111	86–76	—	89–77	—	76–66	—	—	82–70	—	—	92–79
Leicester Riders	—	64–79	—	—	86–78	—	—	86–76	88–82	—	—	121–70
London City Royals	—	—	78–70	—	—	—	—	90–97	103–105	65–72	—	91–78
London Lions	77–57	84–88	—	89–69	102–89	—	—	101–81	—	89–73	—	—
Manchester Giants	—	102–113	73–86	66–73	94–83	75–83	—	—	—	—	91–84	—
Esh Group Eagles Newcastle	82–64	96–94	83–66	—	—	—	102–85	—	—	—	105–97	—
Plymouth Raiders	—	—	—	—	—	67–93	90–98	83–91	—	—	108–89	106–83
DBL Sharks Sheffield	—	—	65–63	69–77	—	—	72–101	104–86	56–85	—	—	—
Surrey Scorchers	—	83–89	72–84	80–84	73–94	70–93	—	—	—	90–69	—	—
Worcester Wolves	88–92	—	—	—	—	79–94	97–78	93–96	—	68–71	152–150	—

Legend: Blue = home team win; Red = away team win.

== Playoffs ==
=== Bracket ===
Quarterfinals
2	Leicester Riders	70	71	141
7	Cheshire Phoenix	62	68	130
1	London Lions	97	72	169
8	Plymouth Raiders	91	86	177
(Pairings are reseeded after the first round)
4	London City Royals	75	65	140
5	Glasgow Rocks	60	72	132
3	Newcastle Eagles	94	93	187
6	Sheffield Sharks	89	102	191

Semifinals
2	Leicester Riders	70	85	155
8	Plymouth Raiders	68	73	141
4	London City Royals	63	91	154
6	Sheffield Sharks	61	69	130

Playoff Final
2	Leicester Riders	93
4	London City Royals	61

=== Quarterfinals ===
The quarterfinal matchups and tip-off times were confirmed by the league, on 28 April 2019.

==== (1) London Lions vs. (8) Plymouth Raiders ====
5 May 2019
15:00

boxscore

Plymouth Raiders	91–97	London Lions
Scoring by quarter: 20–24, 25–19, 19–25, 27–29
Pts: Nicholas 22; Rebs: Nicholas 9 Asts: Nicholas, Wilcher 4		Pts: Peel 26; Rebs: Peel 11; Asts: Spencer 11

Plymouth Pavilions, Plymouth
Referees: Darren Bolt, Gavin Lewis, Simon Unsworth

6 May 2019
16:00

boxscore

London Lions	72–86	Plymouth Raiders
Scoring by quarter: 26–23, 17–22, 17–19, 12–22
Pts: Peel 22; Rebs: Bristol 12; Asts: James, Robinson 3		Pts: Nicholas 24; Rebs: Nicholas 13; Asts: Wilcher 7
Plymouth win 177–169 on aggregate.

Copper Box Arena, London
Attendance: 1,500
Referees: Chris Dodds, Ian Price, Eduard Uydansky

==== (2) Leicester Riders vs. (7) Cheshire Phoenix ====
4 May 2019
19:30

boxscore

Cheshire Phoenix	62–70	Leicester Riders
Scoring by quarter: 17–21, 15–17, 17–12, 13–20
Pts: Gettys, Rolls-Tyson 13; Rebs: Gettys 8 Asts: Norl 3		Pts: Williams 20; Rebs: Holder, Washington 10; Asts: Holder 5

Cheshire Oaks Arena, Ellesmere Port
Attendance: 1,000
Referees: Josh Bowe, Tom Muddiman, Paul Unsworth

5 May 2019
16:00

boxscore

Leicester Riders	71–68	Cheshire Phoenix
Scoring by quarter: 18–17, 16–16, 11–20, 26–15
Pts: Williams 22; Rebs: Ward-Hibbert 10; Asts: Washington 6		Pts: Sayers 17; Rebs: Hayes 8 Asts: Norl 7
Leicester win 141–130 on aggregate.

Leicester Arena, Leicester
Attendance: 1,402
Referees: Rob Hickman, Iain Spearman, Andy Thackray

==== (3) Newcastle Eagles vs. (6) Sheffield Sharks ====
4 May 2019
17:30

boxscore

Sheffield Sharks	89–94	Newcastle Eagles
Scoring by quarter: 25–21, 25–29, 16–18, 23–26
Pts: Alexander 23; Rebs: Marsden 10; Asts: Alexander, Martin 5		Pts: Moses 29; Rebs: Moses 10; Asts: Fletcher 10

English Institute of Sport, Sheffield
Attendance: 1,200
Referees: Ian Price, Eduard Uydansky, Keith Williams

5 May 2019
17:00

boxscore

Newcastle Eagles	93–102	Sheffield Sharks
Scoring by quarter: 18–25, 21–27, 23–27, 31–23
Pts: Fletcher 20; Rebs: Defoe 7 Asts: Fletcher 9		Pts: Alexander 28; Rebs: McKnight 10; Asts: McKnight 9
Sheffield win 191–187 on aggregate.

Eagles Community Arena, Newcastle upon Tyne
Referees: Mariann Dodds-Miklosik, Pawel Szafraniec, Paul Unsworth

==== (4) London City Royals vs. (5) Glasgow Rocks ====
3 May 2019
19:30

boxscore

London City Royals	75–60	Glasgow Rocks
Scoring by quarter: 17–14, 15–9, 20–25, 23–12
Pts: Bryan-Amaning 24; Rebs: Hamilton 17; Asts: Dusha, Hamilton 4		Pts: Pryor 13; Rebs: Achara 10; Asts: Rinkūnas 5

Crystal Palace National Sports Centre, London
Attendance: 250
Referees: Rob Hickman, Eduard Uydansky, Gavin Williams

BBC Red Button

5 May 2019
17:00

boxscore

Glasgow Rocks	72–65	London City Royals
Scoring by quarter: 11–26, 19–9, 21–13, 21–17
Pts: Fraser 28; Rebs: Achara 10; Asts: Achara, Murray 4		Pts: Hamilton 16; Rebs: Hamilton 11; Asts: Dang-Akodo, Jackman 3
Royals win 140–132 on aggregate.

Emirates Arena, Glasgow
Attendance: 800
Referees: Josh Bowe, Iain Macdonald, Graham Shaw

=== Semifinals ===
==== (2) Leicester Riders vs. (8) Plymouth Raiders ====
8 May 2019
19:30

boxscore

Plymouth Raiders	68–70	Leicester Riders
Scoring by quarter: 18–13, 13–21, 22–18, 15–18
Pts: Hassan 18; Rebs: Nicholas 17; Asts: Nicholas 9		Pts: Williams 19; Rebs: Holder 7 Asts: Washington 7

Plymouth Pavilions, Plymouth
Referees: Darren Bolt, Gavin Lewis, Gavin Williams

BBC Red Button

12 May 2019
18:00

boxscore

Leicester Riders	85–73	Plymouth Raiders
Scoring by quarter: 23–23, 23–21, 18–16, 21–13
Pts: Williams 25; Rebs: Thomson 12; Asts: Hampton 5		Pts: Järveläinen 17; Rebs: Nicholas 9 Asts: Nicholas 8
Leicester win 155–141 on aggregate.

Leicester Arena, Leicester
Attendance: 1,383
Referees: Iain Macdonald, Ian Price, Andy Thackray

==== (4) London City Royals vs. (6) Sheffield Sharks ====
9 May 2019
19:30

boxscore

Sheffield Sharks	61–63	London City Royals
Scoring by quarter: 20–28, 10–7, 15–17, 16–11
Pts: Alexander 16; Rebs: Tuck 7 Asts: Martin 3		Pts: Hamilton 13; Rebs: Hamilton 11; Asts: Dang-Akodo 3

English Institute of Sport, Sheffield
Attendance: 1,200
Referees: Josh Bowe, Ian Price, Paul Unsworth

11 May 2019
20:00

boxscore

London City Royals	91–69	Sheffield Sharks
Scoring by quarter: 20–12, 28–15, 19–20, 24–22
Pts: Bryan-Amaning 27; Rebs: Hamilton 12; Asts: Dusha 8		Pts: Williams 30; Rebs: Marsden 7 Asts: McKnight 7
Royals win 154–130 on aggregate.

Crystal Palace National Sports Centre, London
Attendance: 700
Referees: Rob Hickman, Gavin Williams, Keith Williams

=== Playoff Final ===
==== (2) Leicester Riders vs. (4) London City Royals ====
BBC Red Button

19 May 2019
16:00

boxscore

Leicester Riders	93–61	London City Royals
Scoring by quarter: 23–15, 21–21, 27–10, 22–15
Pts: Williams 20; Rebs: Williams 10; Asts: Washington 7		Pts: Bryan-Amaning 19; Rebs: Hamilton 11; Asts: Hamilton, Lucas 3

The O2 Arena, London
Referees: Chris Dodds, Simon Unsworth, Eduard Uydansky

== BBL Cup ==
=== Cup Final ===
BBC Sport

27 January 2019
15:30

boxscore

London Lions	68–54	Glasgow Rocks
Scoring by quarter: 15–10, 15–10, 24–21, 14–13
Pts: Peel 21; Rebs: Peel 14; Asts: Robinson 7		Pts: Carpenter 13; Rebs: Zeigler 10; Asts: Murray 6

Arena Birmingham, Birmingham
Attendance: 7,800
Referees: Gavin Williams, Mariann Dodds-Miklosik, Josh Bowe

== BBL Trophy ==
=== Trophy Final ===
BBC Sport

10 March 2019
15:30

boxscore

London City Royals	90–82 (OT)	London Lions
Scoring by quarter: 11–15, 25–23, 20–15, 16–19, Overtime: 18–10
Pts: Bryan-Amaning 26; Rebs: Hamilton 14; Asts: Bryan-Amaning 7		Pts: Robinson 20; Rebs: Tabb 11; Asts: Spencer 6

Emirates Arena, Glasgow
Attendance: 4,823
Referees: Iain Macdonald, Paul Unsworth, Ian Price

== British clubs in European competitions ==
British clubs returned to European competitions eleven years after their last participation.

Team	Competition	Progress
Leicester Riders	Champions League	First qualifying round
Leicester Riders	FIBA Europe Cup	Regular season

== Notes ==
Preceded by 2017–18 season	BBL seasons 2018–19	Succeeded by 2019–20 season
