= Bristol Flyers =

British professional basketball team

- Leagues: SLB; ENBL
- Established: 2006; 20 years ago
- History: Bristol Academy Flyers; 2006–2014; Bristol Flyers; 2014–present
- Arena: SGS College Arena
- Capacity: 750
- Location: Stoke Gifford, South Gloucestershire
- Team colours: Navy blue, pink, white
- Main sponsor: MCS
- Head coach: Andreas Kapoulas
- Ownership: Stephen Lansdown
- Website: www.bristolflyers.co.uk
Home	Away

The Bristol Flyers are an English professional basketball team based in the city of Bristol. The Flyers compete in the Super League Basketball, after promotion from the English Basketball League in 2014. The team play their home games at the SGS (South Gloucestershire and Stroud College) WISE Arena. The Flyers' head coach is Andreas Kapoulas.

The Flyers, part of the Bristol Academy of Sport, is the largest basketball club in South West England and are a four star accredited England Basketball and Sport England clubmark club. In 2013, the club was acquired by Stephen Lansdown and became a part of the Bristol Sport Ltd group, alongside Bristol City F.C. and Bristol Bears, amongst others.

== History ==
=== Formation and early years ===
The club was established in 2006 through a merger between two Bristol-based teams, the Filton Flyers and Bristol Academy (who were formerly known as the Bristol Bombers). Both teams competed in English Basketball League Division 3 (South West), and were based at the SGS WISE Basketball Arena at Filton College, now South Gloucestershire and Stroud College. Filton Flyers finished the 2005–06 season as Division 3 (South West) Champions and earned a promotion to Division 2 for the following season, whilst Bristol Academy had finished third in the league.

The newly formed Bristol Academy Flyers commenced play in the 2006–07 season, having assumed Filton's spot in Division 2. The Flyers played their first competitive game on 28 October 2006, marking the occasion with a 55–75 home defeat to Kent Crusaders. Flyers' Greg Streete top-scored for the débutantes with 14 points. The new-look team went on to have a very successful season, finishing Division 2 in second place with a 19–3 win record, and gained promotion to Division 1. Further success came in their inaugural appearance in the Patrons Cup. After topping their regional pool with 3 wins and just 1 defeat in the first round, Flyers marched on with a tight 75–74 victory over Team Northumbria in the Semi-final before losing out to Leicester Warriors in the Final on 4 March 2007. Warriors defeated the Flyers 61–55 at the show-piece event at the Metro Radio Arena in Newcastle upon Tyne.

In their Division 1 debut, the Flyers opened their campaign with an away defeat to the previous season's runner up, Reading Rockets. It wasn't until their third game, an away fixture at Derby Trailblazers – who were promoted alongside the Flyers from Division 2 – that Bristol earned their first victory. New American import signing Ryan Williams (formerly of Brooklyn Comets) posted a game-high 28 points in the 83–91 win. Flyers' sporadic form continued throughout the early part of the season and by mid-February they had recorded just a single home win – a 99–75 win over local rivals Taunton Tigers). A 90–84 victory over fellow struggler's Derby on 16 February kick-started a change in fortunes for the Flyers, with the team marching on to record consecutive home wins over West Anglia Fury, Coventry Crusaders and Sheffield Arrows and achieve a respectable fourth-placed finish and a 10–8 win record by the end of the regular season. With home court advantage in the Play-offs, Flyers easily dispatched London Leopards in the Quarter-final with a 105–96 victory, despite Leopards' Gareth Laws posting a massive 39 points. A strong Manchester Magic team defeated the Flyers 88–67 in the Semi-final en route to their first Play-off Championship. Flyers weren't able to better their performance during the 2008–09 season, finishing in 5th place and with first round exits in both the National Trophy and the post-season Play-offs.

=== Cup Finals and League success ===
The arrival of former Appalachian State players Doug McLaughlin-Williams and Davis Browne in the summer of 2009 brought about a new era of success for the Flyers. With Division 1 expanding from 10 to 12 teams for the 2009–10 season, Bristol started the campaign strongly with victories over Coventry Crusaders and Reading Rockets. A dismal 91–60 defeat away to Manchester Magic followed by defeats to London Leopards and Leeds Carnegie in the following weeks ensured that Flyers' challenge for the League title would be a closely fought one. As the season progressed Flyers, along with Manchester, Leeds and Derby Trailblazers, stormed ahead in a bid for the Division title.

As well as their positive form in Division 1, a further distraction for Flyers was their successful run in the National Cup. After disposing of regional rivals Plymouth Marjon and Taunton Tigers in the early rounds, Flyers overcame Reading Rockets, and a 9-point deficit at the start of the fourth quarter, in a tough Quarter-final tie to win 80–84. A comfortable 83–76 victory at home to Division 1 rivals Derby in the Semi-final saw Bristol progress to their first ever National Cup Final where they were to face another league title rival, Manchester, at the English Institute of Sport in Sheffield. A low scoring and strong defensive performance from both teams produced a particularly scrappy Final. With Manchester holding a 2-point lead in the final minute, Flyers' McLaughlin-Williams managed to tie the game 57–57 with two out of three free throws on 1.9 seconds and force Overtime before coming out as eventual winners, with the 63–61 victory. Davis Browne was named as the game's MVP with 12 points, 13 rebounds and 2 blocks to his name.

Back in Division 1, Bristol were able to continue their successful form and went on an 11-game winning streak to finish in fourth place with 16–6 record (Second and third-placed Manchester and Leeds also finished 16–6 but were placed higher due to their head-to-head results with Flyers). They swept passed fifth seed Leicester Warriors in the post-season Play-offs but lost in the Semi-final to Derby, who ran out 76–65 winners, at the Final Four event at the Amaechi Basketball Centre in Manchester.

Summer 2010 saw a contraction of the number of teams in Division 1, going back to 10, and with the bulk of Flyers' roster returning for the new campaign, hopes of further success were high for the 2010–11 season. Starting the regular season campaign with a 9-game winning streak – including victories over fellow title-rivals Leeds, Manchester, Derby, and Reading – it wasn't until 5 February 2011 that Flyers experienced their first League defeat; a 51–80 loss at home to Leopards. The team also had another emphatic run in the National Cup in a bid to defend their title from the previous season, knocking out Birmingham Mets (59–104), Plymouth Marjon (53–92), Leeds (85–43) and Derby (69–93) on their way to their second successive appearance in the Final. They were not able to retain their crown however, instead coming up short to Brixton TopCats at the Final at Ponds Forge in Sheffield. An injury-hit Flyers team were defeated 77–63 by the underdogs. The team didn't lose momentum as they continued their excellent form in the regular season and stormed to their first Division 1 League title, finishing with a 15–3 win record. In the post-season Play-offs, the team narrowly defeated the eighth-placed seed Derby, 91–90, in the Quarter-final before being knocked out by Leeds in the Semi-final, in a tight 81–85 loss at the Amaechi Basketball Centre.

The team entered into the 2011–12 campaign with key American's Davis Browne and Doug McLaughlin-Williams re-signed for the third consecutive season along with Flyers mainstays Tyrone Treasure and Greg Streete, as well as the addition of former Worcester Wolves players Jordan Ranklin and Roy Owen. A strong start in the National Trophy saw Flyers top Pool 1 and progress to the Quarter-finals where they defeated Bradford Dragons, 59–50. They went on to beat London Leopards in the Semi-final (69–62) before being blown away by a dominant and forceful Derby side in the Final at Leicester's Braunstone Leisure Centre, losing 60–87. Another successful run in the National Cup saw Flyers record a third consecutive appearance in the Final where they faced London Leopards. Despite leading the whole game until the final two minutes, a disastrous fourth quarter – where Flyers conceded 26 points and scored just 13 – saw Bristol lose 64–63 and subsequently gift the title to London. In the regular season campaign, Flyers also finished as runner-up to London in the Division 1 title race, before being knocked out by Derby Trailblazers in the Semi-final of the Play-offs.

Flyers opened the 2012–13 season with a record attendance of 750 spectators watching a pre-season exhibition against Team USA Select at WISE Arena. A strong start in the National Trophy first round saw Flyers finish in second place in Pool 2 and advance to the Quarter-finals, where they recorded a 79–75 victory against Medway Park Crusaders. A second consecutive Final appearance wasn't to be for Bristol, as they were knocked out with an away defeat to Tees Valley Mohawks. Tees Valley's Jorge Ebanks posted 31 points as the Mohwaks recorded a 95–89 win over the Flyers.

The Flyers roster was boosted by the signing of Spanish guard Francisco Robles, formerly of CAI Zaragoza, in November 2012. Robles made an instant impact and scored a buzzer beating three-point shot to secure a 68–71 away victory against Hemel Storm in the National Cup Quarter-final. Having previously defeated Plymouth Marjon and Worcester Wolves II in earlier rounds, Bristol edged past Reading Rockets in the Semi-final with a 72–64 victory at the WISE Arena. Sixteen-year-old local student Dwayne Lautier-Ogunleye posted 15 points for the Flyers who progressed to their fourth consecutive National Cup Final. However Bristol's winless streak in the show-piece event continued as they were closely defeated by Leeds Carnegie at Ponds Forge. Though Flyers led for most of the game, an incredible 14-point comeback from Carnegie in the final two and half minutes saw the Yorkshire team claim the silverware with a 66–64 victory.

In Division 1 play, injuries to key starting five players Tyrone Treasure (out from November for 9 months) and Doug McLaughlin-Williams hindered any potential title bid. A three-game losing streak in early March further dented any title hopes but following a run of eight victories at the end of the regular season, the team had risen from rank-outsiders to finish in 2nd place for a second consecutive year – though several victories away from 1st placed Reading Rockets. In the post-season Play-offs, Bristol were drawn to play sixth seeded Worthing Thunder who finished their campaign with a 50% win percentage. Despite being favourites, Bristol fell to the visiting Thunder and were knocked out after a 71–76 defeat. Enrique Garcia and Doug McLaughlin-Williams both scored 14 points for the homes side, but it was Bud Johnson from the visitors that stole the show with 26 points.

=== Takeover and BBL move ===
On 17 June 2013, it was announced that the club had received financial backing from Stephen Lansdown, owner of Bristol City Football Club and the 'Bristol Sport Ltd' group. As part of the deal, the club would be entering into the top-level British Basketball League (BBL) for the 2014–15 season as its newest franchise and rebranding itself as the Bristol Flyers (from 2014).

On court, the team saw several changes to its roster including the departures of Enrique Garcia and Francisco Robles, whilst Coach Kapoulas drafted in Spencer Wells, who had previously played in Italy and Germany. Unlike previous seasons, the team struggled in the National Trophy opening stages and failed to qualify for the Quarter-final. Their form didn't improve much in the National Cup and for the first time since the 2008–09 season, Bristol did not make an appearance in the Final, having been knocked out in the Quarter-final after 58–73 defeat at home to Reading. Sporadic victories and mixed form across their regular season campaign earned the team a 7th-place finish and a place in the Play-off Quarter-final, where they were defeated by Essex Leopards. However moderate success did come in the form of an invitational place in the 1st round of the BBL Trophy. Despite their poor form throughout the season, Bristol claimed a historic shock victory against Surrey United of the higher-level British Basketball League, in the knock-out competition. England Under-18 international star Dwayne Lautier-Ogunleye high-scored for the Flyers in the 91–75 win, posting 19 points and 8 rebounds. Flyers' giant-killing feat was short lived, as they were defeated in the Quarter-finals by Cheshire Phoenix.

In preparation for the start of their inaugural BBL campaign, Coach Kapoulas signed American's Doug Herring from Saint John Mill Rats and ex-Cheshire Phoenix star Alif Bland, from German ProA team Cuxhaven BasCats. In their inaugural BBL season, the Flyers finished eighth in the league, qualifying for the playoffs. However they were defeated by eventual champions Newcastle Eagles. In the next season the team finished 10th. Despite that, new signings Daniel Edozie and Cardell McFarland made a big impact on the team; McFarland made BBL team of the week multiple times and Edozie led the entire league in rebounds in the 2015/16 season.

Ahead of the 2016/17 league, veteran Doug McLaughlin-Williams was dropped from the team, with Danish international Mathias Seilund and key playmaker of the previous season Cardell McFarland also departing. To fill the gaps in the roster, the team acquired BBL veterans Michael Vigor and Lovell Cook, British Virgin Islands international Leslee Smith, Brandon Boggs from the Kongsberg Miners in Norway and Hameed Ali, playing his first professional basketball after five years with the Texas A&M-Corpus Christi Islanders in NCAA Division I.

Ahead of the 2018/19 season, Bristol Sport announced plans for a new 4,000-seat arena for the Flyers next to Bristol City F.C.'s stadium Ashton Gate Stadium.

Following a third place finish in the 2022/23 main season, it was announced that the Flyers would join the European North Basketball League from 2023/24. The team progressed to the quarter final stage of the ENBL, but multiple injuries contributed to a seventh place finish in the 2023/24 BBL. Flyers re-entered the ENBL for 2024/25 and became a founder member of the new Super League Basketball.

== Logos ==
Bristol Academy Flyers logo (2006–2014)

Bristol Flyers
logo (2014–2024)

== Home arena ==
WISE Arena (2006–present)
Bristol Sports & Convention Centre (proposed)

As 6 October 2022, the Bristol Flyers had plans approved to build their new arena near Ashton Gate stadium. Work on Bristol Sport's Ashton Gate Sporting Quarter, which will include a new 5,000 seat basketball arena and a hotel, will now start construction in 2025.

== Season-by-season records ==
Seasons 2006–2014
Season	Division	Tier	Regular Season						Post-Season	Trophy	Cup	Head coach
Season	Division	Tier	Finish	Played	Wins	Losses	Points	Win %	Post-Season	Trophy	Cup	Head coach
Bristol Academy Flyers
2006–07	EBL	3	2nd	22	19	3	38	0.863	Quarter-finals	Runner-up (PC)	Quarter-finals (NC)	Andreas Kapoulas
2007–08	EBL	2	4th	18	10	8	20	0.555	Semi-finals	1st round (NT)	Quarter-finals (NC)	Andreas Kapoulas
2008–09	EBL	2	5th	18	9	9	18	0.500	Quarter-finals	1st round (NT)	2nd round (NC)	Andreas Kapoulas
2009–10	EBL	2	4th	22	16	6	32	0.727	Quarter-finals	Quarter-finals (NT)	Winners, beating Manchester, 63-61 (OT)	Andreas Kapoulas
2010–11	EBL	2	1st	18	15	3	30	0.833	Semi-finals	2nd round (NT)	Runner-up (NC)	Andreas Kapoulas
2011–12	EBL	2	2nd	24	18	6	36	0.750	Semi-finals	Runner-up (NT)	Runner-up (NC)	Andreas Kapoulas
2012–13	EBL	2	2nd	26	18	8	36	0.692	Quarter-finals	Semi-finals (NT)	Runner-up (NC)	Andreas Kapoulas
2013–14	EBL	2	7th	26	14	12	28	0.538	Quarter-finals	1st round (NT)	Quarter-finals (NC)	Andreas Kapoulas

Seasons 2014–2024
Season	Division	Tier	Regular Season						Post-Season	Trophy	Cup	Head coach
Season	Division	Tier	Finish	Played	Wins	Losses	Points	Win %	Post-Season	Trophy	Cup	Head coach
Bristol Flyers
2014–15	BBL	1	8th	36	13	23	26	0.361	Quarter-finals	1st round (BT)	Semi-finals (BC)	Andreas Kapoulas
2015–16	BBL	1	10th	33	9	24	18	0.273	Did not qualify	1st round (BT)	Quarter-finals (BC)	Andreas Kapoulas
2016–17	BBL	1	7th	33	16	17	32	0.485	Quarter-finals	Quarter-finals (BT)	1st round (BC)	Andreas Kapoulas
2017–18	BBL	1	6th	33	19	14	38	0.576	Semi-finals, losing to Leicester	1st round (BT)	1st round (BC)	Andreas Kapoulas
2018–19	BBL	1	10th	33	14	19	28	0.424	Did not qualify	1st round (BT)	1st round (BC)	Andreas Kapoulas
2019–20	BBL	1	Season cancelled due to COVID-19 pandemic							Semi-finals (BT)	Runners Up, losing to Worcester (BC)	Andreas Kapoulas
2020–21	BBL	1	8th	30	12	18	24	0.400	Quarter-finals	1st round (BT)	Quarter-finals (BC)	Andreas Kapoulas
2021–22	BBL	1	4th	27	14	13	28	0.519	Semi-finals, losing to London	Semi-finals (BT)	Quarter-finals (BC)	Andreas Kapoulas
2022–23	BBL	1	3rd	36	25	11	50	0.694	Semi-finals, losing to Leicester	1st round (BT)	Semi-finals (BC)	Andreas Kapoulas
2023–24	BBL	1	7th	36	16	20	32	0.444	Quarter-finals	Pool Stage (BT)		Andreas Kapoulas

=== SLB season-by-season ===
Champions	SLB champions	Runners-up	Playoff berth

Season	Tier	League	Regular season					Postseason	Cup	Trophy	Head coach
Season	Tier	League	Finish	Played	Wins	Losses	Win %	Postseason	Cup	Trophy	Head coach
Bristol Flyers
2024–25	1	SLB	7th	32	13	19	.406	Quarterfinals	Semifinals	Runners-up	Andreas Kapoulas
2025–26	1	SLB	6th	32	15	17	.469	Quarterfinals	Quarterfinals	Semifinals	Andreas Kapoulas
Championship record				64	28	36	.438	0 championships			
Playoff record				4	0	4	.000	0 playoff championships			

== Players ==
=== Current roster ===
Note: Flags indicate national team eligibility at FIBA-sanctioned events. Players may hold other non-FIBA nationalities not displayed.

Bristol Flyers roster
Players
Coaches

Pos.	No.	Nat.	Name	Ht.	Wt.	Age
G	0	(United States)	Holden, Cam	1.96 m (6 ft 5 in)	91 kg (201 lb)	26 – 1 January 2000
F	2	(United States)	Diggins Jr, Michael	2.05 m (6 ft 9 in)	88 kg (194 lb)	28 – 11 January 1998
SF	10	(United States)	Anderson, Zach	2.01 m (6 ft 7 in)	93 kg (205 lb)	24 – 3 June 2002
G	4	(Canada)	Case, Matteus	1.96 m (6 ft 5 in)	89 kg (196 lb)	25 – 13 July 2001
G	5	(United States)	Bailey, Davion	1.93 m (6 ft 4 in)	88 kg (194 lb)	24 – 16 November 2001
G	1	(Australia)	Triplett, Zac	1.96 m (6 ft 5 in)	75 kg (165 lb)	25 – 19 October 2001
SG	9	(New Zealand)	Wilkie, Dylan	1.91 m (6 ft 3 in)	80 kg (176 lb)	25 – 16 October 2001
G	13	(United States)	Jennings, Kasen	1.90 m (6 ft 3 in)	92 kg (203 lb)	25 – 1 January 2001
SG	99	(Lithuania)	Zajankauskas, Nojus	1.94 m (6 ft 4 in)		19 – 6 January 2007
F	21	(United Kingdom)	Delpeche, Marcus	2.00 m (6 ft 7 in)	98 kg (216 lb)	31 – 28 September 1995
C	22	(United Kingdom)	Delpeche, Malcolm	2.03 m (6 ft 8 in)	98 kg (216 lb)	31 – 28 September 1995
F	25	(Serbia)	Dugalic, Milos	2.06 m (6 ft 9 in)	98 kg (216 lb)	26 – 6 January 2000

Head coach

- (Greece) Andreas Kapoulas

Assistant coach(es)

- (United Kingdom) Chris Bourne
- (United Kingdom) Nick Burns

Legend

- (C) Team captain
- Injured

- Roster
Updated: September 9, 2026

=== Notable former players ===
Note: Flags indicate national team eligibility at FIBA-sanctioned events. Players may hold other non-FIBA nationalities not displayed.

Criteria

To appear in this section a player must have either:

- Set a club record or won an individual award while at the club
- Played at least one official international match for their national team at any time
- Played at least one official NBA match at any time.

- (United Kingdom) Evan Walshe (2024–26)
- (United Kingdom) Jelani Watson–Gayle (2022–23)
- (United Kingdom) Teddy Okereafor (2020–21)
- (United States) Fred Thomas (2018–2020)
- (Australia) Mike Vigor (2016–2019)
- (United Kingdom) Roy Owen (2011–2018)
- (United States) Brandon Boggs (2016–2018)
- (United States) Leslee Smith (2016–2018, 2020–2025)
- (United Kingdom) Greg Streete (2006–2017)
- (United States) Hameed Ali (2016–2017)
- (United States) Aaron Cosby (2016–2017)
- (United States) Lovell Cook (2016)
- (United States) Doug McLaughlin–Williams (2009–2016)
- (United Kingdom) Jordan Ranklin (2011–2016)
- (Denmark) Mathias Seilund (2014–2016)
- (United States) Cardell McFarland (2015–2016)
- (United States) Tyrone Lee (2015–2016)
- (United Kingdom) Dwayne Lautier–Ogunleye (2012–2015)
- (Lithuania) Aistis Keliauskas (2012–2015)
- (United Kingdom) Deane Williams (2013–2015)
- (United States) Alif Bland (2014–2015)
- (United States) Doug Herring, Jr. (2014–2015)
- (United States) Bryquis Perine (2014–2015)
- (United Kingdom) Mostapha Alfaki (2011–2014)
- (United Kingdom) Spencer Wells (2013–2014)
- (United Kingdom) Steven Borde (2013–2014)
- (United Kingdom) Tyrone Treasure (2006–2013)
- (United Kingdom) Tony Watson (2006–2013)
- (Spain) Francisco Robles (2012–2013)
- (United States) Davis Bowne (2009–2012)
- (United Kingdom) Tom Hutchinson (2006–2010)
- (United Kingdom) Gareth Till (2008–2010)
- (Canada) (United Kingdom) Brody Bishop (2008–2009)
- (Sweden) Harim Nyori (2008–2009)
- (United Kingdom) Richard Loftman (2008–2009)
- (United States) Ryan Keyon Williams (2007–2008)

== Women's Players ==
Bristol Flyers 24-25 roster
Players
Coaches

Pos.	No.	Nat.	Name	Ht.
F	5	(Australia)	Roscoe, Samantha	6 ft 5 in (1.96 m)
G	7	(United Kingdom)	Maloney-Danvers, Estella	5 ft 6 in (1.68 m)
G	8	(United Kingdom)	Jepson, Leila	5 ft 8 in (1.73 m)
G	11	(United Kingdom)	Hinett, Chloe	5 ft 8 in (1.73 m)
G	13	(United Kingdom)	Kheing, Kim	5 ft 7 in (1.70 m)
G	14	(United Kingdom)	Jurca, Melissa	5 ft 7 in (1.70 m)
F	15	(Argentina)	Marchizotti, Mara (C)	6 ft 4 in (1.93 m)
F	29	(Nigeria)	Iweanya, Veronica	5 ft 11 in (1.80 m)
F	35	(Canada)	Ball, Marlee	5 ft 11 in (1.80 m)

Head coach

(United Kingdom) Darren Oakey

Assistant coach(es)

(United Kingdom) Chris Staddon

Legend

- (C) Team captain
- Injured
