= 2019–20 British Basketball League season =

2019–20 BBL season
- League: British Basketball League
- Season: 2019–20
- Games played: 73 (Note: A cumulative total of 77 games were played before the season was suspended and ultimately voided. Four games were expunged from the overall tallies, following London City Royals' withdrawal from the league.)
- Teams: 12

Regular season
- League champions: No champions declared
- BBL Cup: Worcester Wolves (1st title)
- BBL Trophy: Newcastle Eagles (7th title)

Statistical leaders
Points	Lovell Cook (Scorchers); (267 points)	C. J. Gettys (Eagles); (24.7 PPG)
Rebounds	Brandon Peel (Lions); (125 rebounds)	C. J. Gettys (Eagles); (13.2 RPG)
Assists	Rahmon Fletcher (Eagles); (117 assists)	Rahmon Fletcher (Eagles); (9.0 APG)

Records
- Highest scoring: 213 points; Plymouth Raiders 103–110 Newcastle Eagles; (8 December 2019)
- Winning streak: 6 games; Leicester Riders; (17 January – 29 February 2020); Glasgow Rocks; (7 February – 14 March 2020)
- Losing streak: 13 games; Manchester Giants; (8 December 2019 – 13 March 2020)

BBL seasons
- ← 2018–19 2020–21 →

2019–20 was the 33rd season of the British Basketball League, the top British professional basketball tier, since its establishment in 1987. The season began with 12 teams from across England and Scotland but London City Royals folded mid-campaign.

The BBL Cup, won by Worcester Wolves, and Trophy, won by Newcastle were concluded before, on 17 March 2020, the season was curtailed due to the COVID-19 pandemic in the United Kingdom with the Eagles' victory over Solent in the Trophy final proving to be the last completed fixture.

No League champions were ultimately declared despite a claim from Glasgow Rocks to be awarded the title due to their lead in wins and winning percentage at the time of the shutdown.

== Changes to format ==
The 2019–20 season saw a significantly revamped format for the first time in a number of years.

The newly-formatted BBL Cup began the 2019–20 season in September, with group stages (2 geographical groups, North and South, of 6 teams each) to determine 8 teams to progress to the Quarter-finals. Single-legged quarter finals and two-legged semi finals matches would determine the two finalists to contest the Cup final.

The Championship was scheduled to run from December to April. All 12 teams were to play each other twice, once home once away, for a 22-game regular season (as opposed to previous years where teams would play each other 3 times for a 33-game regular season).

For the first time in 21 years, playoff quarter and semi-finals were due to be determined over a best-of-three series with the top eight finishers in the league qualifying. The Playoffs Final had been scheduled for the O2 Arena, London.

== Teams ==
Locations of the 2019–20 BBL teams

=== Arenas and locations ===
Team	City	Arena	Capacity
Bristol Flyers	Bristol	SGS WISE Arena	750
Cheshire Phoenix	Ellesmere Port	Cheshire Oaks Arena	1,400
Radisson RED Glasgow Rocks	Glasgow	Emirates Arena	1,650
Leicester Riders	Leicester	Morningside Arena	2,400
London City Royals	London	Crystal Palace NSC	1,500
London Lions	London	Copper Box	7,000
Manchester Giants	Manchester	George H. Carnall Centre	750
Newcastle Eagles	Newcastle upon Tyne	Eagles Community Arena	3,000
Plymouth Raiders	Plymouth	Plymouth Pavilions	1,500
B.Braun Sheffield Sharks	Sheffield	Ponds Forge	1,000
Surrey Scorchers	Guildford	Surrey Sports Park	1,000
Worcester Wolves	Worcester	University of Worcester Arena	2,000

=== Personnel and sponsorship ===
Team	Head coach	Captain	Main jersey sponsor
Bristol Flyers	(Greece) Andreas Kapoulas	(England) Daniel Edozie	Toogood International
Cheshire Phoenix	(England) Ben Thomas	(Serbia) Momčilo Latinović	Hillyer McKeown
Radisson RED Glasgow Rocks	(France) Vincent Lavandier	(Scotland) Gareth Murray	Carling
Leicester Riders	(United States) Rob Paternostro	(England) Andrew Thomson	Jelson Homes
London City Royals	(England) Lloyd Gardner	(England) Orlan Jackman	
London Lions	(England) Vince Macaulay	(England) Joe Ikhinmwin	ASOS
Manchester Giants	(England) Danny Byrne	(England) Callum Jones	Space
Newcastle Eagles	(England) Ian McLeod	(United States) Rahmon Fletcher	ESH Group
Plymouth Raiders	(England) Paul James	(Australia) Josh Wilcher	
B.Braun Sheffield Sharks	(United States) Atiba Lyons	(Canada) Mike Tuck	B.Braun
Surrey Scorchers	(Zimbabwe) Creon Raftopoulos	(England) Tayo Ogedengbe	Gidden Place
Worcester Wolves	(England) Matthew Newby	(Netherlands) Maarten Bouwknecht	University of Worcester

=== Coaching changes ===
Team	Outgoing coach	Manner of departure	Date of vacancy	Position in table	Incoming coach	Date of appointment
Worcester Wolves	(England) Tony Garbelotto	End of Interim	1 May 2019	Pre-season	(England) Matthew Newby	22 July 2019
London City Royals	(England) Jay Williams	Released	12 August 2019	Pre-season	(England) Lloyd Gardner	16 August 2019
Newcastle Eagles	(United States) Fabulous Flournoy	Signed by Toronto Raptors	3 September 2019	Pre-season	(England) Ian McLeod	6 September 2019

== BBL Cup ==
The newly-formatted BBL Cup began the 2019–20 season on Friday 20 September, with the group stages running until Sunday 24 November. The 12 teams were split into 2 geographical groups, North and South. Each team played each other twice (once home, once away) with the top 4 teams in each group progressing to the Quarter-finals. Single-legged quarter finals and two-legged semi finals matches determined the two finalists to contest the Cup final on Sunday 26 January at the Arena Birmingham.

=== Qualification Stage ===
==== North Group ====
Pos	Team	Pld	W	L	PF	PA	PD	Qualification	LEI	SHE	NEW	CHE	GLA	MAN
1	Leicester Riders	10	7	3	812	676	+136	Qualification to quarter finals	—	75–54	86–94	58–66	93–58	102–70
2	Sheffield Sharks	10	7	3	804	723	+81	Qualification to quarter finals	79–63	—	93–69	75–60	84–68	95–61
3	Newcastle Eagles	10	6	4	868	794	+74	Qualification to quarter finals	69–76	80–83	—	97–68	71–73	104–71
4	Cheshire Phoenix	10	5	5	755	786	−31	Qualification to quarter finals	63–75	76–72	92–100	—	78–88	96–85
5	Glasgow Rocks	10	4	6	719	764	−45		66–88	101–81	86–90	72–74	—	107–85
6	Manchester Giants	10	1	9	649	864	−215		57–96	70–88	66–94	64–82	20–0	—

Source: http://www.bbl.org.uk/
Legend: Blue = home team win; Red = away team win.

==== South Group ====
Pos	Team	Pld	W	L	PF	PA	PD	Qualification	LCR	WOR	BRI	LON	SUR	PLY
1	London City Royals	10	8	2	860	793	+67	Qualification to quarter finals	—	77–64	84–57	92–77	92–84	101–92
2	Worcester Wolves	10	6	4	798	798	0	Qualification to quarter finals	65–67	—	74–70	92–67	77–78	104–100
3	Bristol Flyers	10	6	4	835	837	−2	Qualification to quarter finals	85–75	94–96	—	97–94	107–99	92–72
4	London Lions	10	5	5	892	872	+20	Qualification to quarter finals	100–99	85–90	103–69	—	98–87	101–86
5	Surrey Scorchers	10	3	7	829	862	−33		82–84	77–83	64–71	80–77	—	87–77
6	Plymouth Raiders	10	2	8	849	901	−52		87–89	83–53	76–93	80–90	96–91	—

Source: http://www.bbl.org.uk/
Legend: Blue = home team win; Red = away team win.

=== Quarter-finals ===
29 November 2019

Leicester Riders	72–63	London Lions

Morningside Arena, Leicester

29 November 2019

Worcester Wolves	90–86	Newcastle Eagles

University of Worcester Arena, Worcester

1 December 2019

London City Royals	100–82	Cheshire Phoenix

Crystal Palace National Sports Centre, South London

1 December 2019

Sheffield Sharks	58–81	Bristol Flyers

Ponds Forge, Sheffield

=== Semi-finals ===
13 December 2019

Worcester Wolves	63–66	Leicester Riders

University of Worcester Arena, Worcester

3 January 2020

Leicester Riders	71–83	Worcester Wolves
Worcester win 146–137 on aggregate

Morningside Arena, Leicester

13 December 2019

London City Royals	82–84	Bristol Flyers

Crystal Palace National Sports Centre, South London

21 December 2019

Bristol Flyers	91–77	London City Royals
Bristol win 175–159 on aggregate

SGS WISE Arena, Bristol

=== Final ===
26 January 2020

boxscore report

Bristol Flyers	59–67	Worcester Wolves
Scoring by quarter: 12–16, 13–18, 18–13, 16–20
Pts: Gentrey Thomas (13); Rebs: Daniel Edozie (10); Asts: Chris Taylor (4)		Pts: Amir Williams (23); Rebs: Amir Williams (13); Asts: Maarten Bouwknecht (7)

Arena Birmingham, Birmingham
Attendance: 9,244

== BBL Championship ==
The BBL Championship ran from Friday 6 December – Tuesday 17 March. All 12 teams were scheduled to play each other twice, once home and once away, for a 22-game regular season. On 24 January 2020, London City Royals withdrew from the league, and their 1–3 record was expunged. (Note: The results expunged were a 98–90 victory over Plymouth Raiders, and losses of 104–89 against London Lions, 95–71 to Bristol Flyers and a 20–0 forfeit against Glasgow Rocks.)

On 17 March 2020, the season was suspended due to the COVID-19 pandemic in the United Kingdom. On 1 June 2020, the season was cancelled, with no League or Playoffs champions declared.

=== Standings ===
Pos	Team	Pld	W	L	PF	PA	PD	Pts	Qualification
1	Glasgow Rocks	15	12	3	1275	1089	+186	24	
2	London Lions	14	10	4	1280	1159	+121	20	Basketball Champions League qualifying rounds
3	Worcester Wolves	14	9	5	1173	1106	+67	18	
4	Leicester Riders	12	8	4	1048	975	+73	16	
5	Cheshire Phoenix	13	7	6	1079	1060	+19	14	
6	Newcastle Eagles	13	7	6	1147	1119	+28	14	
7	Sheffield Sharks	13	7	6	1060	1060	0	14	
8	Bristol Flyers	12	5	7	937	992	−55	10	
9	Surrey Scorchers	14	5	9	1243	1340	−97	10	
10	Plymouth Raiders	13	3	10	1098	1185	−87	6	
11	Manchester Giants	13	0	13	1003	1258	−255	0	
12	London City Royals	0	0	0	0	0	0	0	Withdrew from the league

Source: BBC Sport

=== Results ===
Home \ Away	BRI	CHE	GLA	LEI	LON	MAN	NEW	PLY	SHE	SUR	WOR
Bristol Flyers		98–94	71–89	73–69	66–75	87–71			71–85		81–66
Cheshire Phoenix			71–87	95–91		99–88		97–64	83–78		
Glasgow Rocks	94–55	79–67				92–53	76–80	67–76	98–61	102–81	91–86
Leicester Riders			70–71		83–76	105–82	101–63	97–79	87–80		91–87
London Lions	99–88	94–78	88–72	99–65					87–79	107–98	
Manchester Giants		69–77			73–103		81–97	90–96	87–106		76–79
Newcastle Eagles		70–88			108–97	131–63			76–99	91–78	79–95
Plymouth Raiders	69–75	74–77	82–86	74–90	82–91		103–110			111–82	
Sheffield Sharks					86–91	92–80	67–66			81–76	76–69
Surrey Scorchers	93–87	89–88	79–95	96–99	101–95	94–90	94–104	107–97			
Worcester Wolves	88–85	79–65	69–76		80–78		77–72	116–91	89–70	93–75	

Source: bbl.org.uk
Legend: Blue = home team win; Red = away team win.
Matches with lighter background shading were decided after overtime.

== BBL Trophy ==
The BBL Trophy retained the same format as introduced in the 2018–19 season. The twelve BBL teams were joined in the first round draw by four invited teams; Solent Kestrels and Worthing Thunder from the English Basketball League, Dunfermline Reign from the Scottish Basketball Championship and Basketball Wales. There was an open draw to form a bracket, mapping out each team's path to the final which was held, for the eighth consecutive year, at the Emirates Arena in Glasgow.

=== First round ===
3 January 2020

Newcastle Eagles	133–61	Dunfermline Reign

Eagles Community Arena, Newcastle

3 January 2020

Plymouth Raiders	62–71	Sheffield Sharks

Plymouth Pavilions, Plymouth

4 January 2020

London Lions	82–92	Solent Kestrels

University of East London, London

5 January 2020

Surrey Scorchers	83–102	London City Royals

Surrey Sports Park, Surrey

5 January 2020

Glasgow Rocks	97–34	Basketball Wales

Emirates Arena, Glasgow

5 January 2020

Manchester Giants	84–88	Worthing Thunder

George H. Carnall Centre, Manchester

5 January 2020

Cheshire Phoenix	88–69	Worcester Wolves

Cheshire Oaks Arena, Cheshire

10 January 2020

Bristol Flyers	95–82	Leicester Riders

SGS WISE Arena, Bristol

=== Quarter-finals ===
19 January 2020

Glasgow Rocks	90–92 (2OT)	Cheshire Phoenix

Emirates Arena, Glasgow

24 January 2020

Newcastle Eagles	86–79	Sheffield Sharks

Eagles Community Arena, Newcastle

25 January 2020

Worthing Thunder	81–94	Solent Kestrels

Worthing Leisure Centre, Worthing

London City Royals	P–P (Note: The match had been scheduled for 26 January 2020. Bristol Flyers were given a bye into the semi-finals following London City Royals' withdrawal from the league.)	Bristol Flyers

Crystal Palace National Sports Centre, London

=== Semi-finals ===
9 February 2020

Cheshire Phoenix	79–88	Newcastle Eagles

Cheshire Oaks Arena, Cheshire

1 March 2020

Newcastle Eagles	67–75	Cheshire Phoenix
Newcastle win 155–154 on aggregate

Eagles Community Arena, Newcastle

12 February 2020

Solent Kestrels	103–67	Bristol Flyers

Solent Sports Complex, Southampton

16 February 2020

Bristol Flyers	92–73	Solent Kestrels
Solent Kestrels win 176–159 on aggregate

SGS WISE Arena, Bristol

=== Final ===
15 March 2020
3:30 pm

boxscore
report

Newcastle Eagles	96–94 (OT)	Solent Kestrels
Scoring by quarter: 22–22, 24–23, 31–20, 10–22, Overtime: 9–7
Pts: Rahmon Fletcher (29); Rebs: Cj Gettys (17); Asts: Cj Gettys (7)		Pts: Elliott Sentance (26); Rebs: Travis Charles (10); Asts: Elliot Dadds (8)

Emirates Arena, Glasgow
Attendance: 1,000

== British clubs in European competitions ==
No British clubs participated in European competition for the 2019–20 season. Leicester and London both declined their invitations from FIBA.

== Notes ==
Preceded by 2018–19 season	BBL seasons 2019–20	Succeeded by 2020–21 season
