= 2023–24 London Lions season =

- BBL champions
- Playoff champions
- Head coach: (Serbia) Petar Božić
- Captain: (United States) Sam Dekker
- Arena: Copper Box Arena

BBL results
- Record: 33–3 (.917)
- Ladder: 1st
- BBL Trophy: Runners-up (lost to Phoenix 82–98)
- Playoff finish: Champions (2nd title) (Defeated Phoenix 88–85)
- EuroCup: Semifinalist (lost to Paris 0–2)
- Stats at BBL.org.uk
- All statistics correct as of 19 May 2024.

The 2023–24 London Lions season is the 47th season of the franchise in the British Basketball League (BBL), and their 12th under the banner of London Lions.

This season will be their first under the leadership of their new head coach Petar Božić, and their second season in the EuroCup Basketball competition.

== Roster ==
Note: Flags indicate national team eligibility at FIBA-sanctioned events. Players may hold other non-FIBA nationalities not displayed.

London Lions roster
Players
Coaches

Pos.	No.	Nat.	Name	Ht.	Wt.
C	0	(United Kingdom)	Olaseni, Gabriel	2.10 m (6 ft 11 in)	104 kg (229 lb)
G	1	(United States)	Taylor, Jordan (I)	1.85 m (6 ft 1 in)	88 kg (194 lb)
G/F	2	(United States)	Nwaba, David (I)	1.96 m (6 ft 5 in)	99 kg (218 lb)
G	5	(United Kingdom)	Udeh, Remy	1.85 m (6 ft 1 in)	80 kg (176 lb)
G/F	6	(United Kingdom)	Soluade, Morayo	1.96 m (6 ft 5 in)	89 kg (196 lb)
F	7	(United States)	Dekker, Sam (C & I)	2.03 m (6 ft 8 in)	99 kg (218 lb)
F/C	9	(Canada)	Morgan, Conor	2.06 m (6 ft 9 in)	100 kg (220 lb)
G	10	(United Kingdom)	Nelson, Luke	1.91 m (6 ft 3 in)	86 kg (190 lb)
G	11	(United Kingdom)	Queeley, Kareem	1.93 m (6 ft 4 in)	91 kg (201 lb)
C	14	(United Kingdom)	Djanogly, Joshua	2.03 m (6 ft 8 in)	98 kg (216 lb)
C	20	(United Kingdom)	Sharma, Josh	2.13 m (7 ft 0 in)	104 kg (229 lb)
G	22	(United Kingdom)	Phillip, Tarik	1.91 m (6 ft 3 in)	87 kg (192 lb)
F	23	(United Kingdom)	Sandy, Ciaran	2.01 m (6 ft 7 in)	88 kg (194 lb)
G	30	(United States)	Morgan, Matt (I)	1.93 m (6 ft 4 in)	84 kg (185 lb)
G	31	(United Kingdom)	Kaboza, Bradley	1.88 m (6 ft 2 in)	79 kg (174 lb)
F	32	(United States)	Grantham, Donte (I)	2.03 m (6 ft 8 in)	95 kg (209 lb)

Head coach

- (Serbia) Petar Božić

Assistant coach(es)

- (Turkey) Polat Kaya
- (United Kingdom) Robert Youngblood

Legend

- (C) Team captain
- (DP) Development player
- (IN) Inactive
- (I) Import player
- Injured

- Roster
Updated: 6 March 2024

== Standings ==
=== Ladder ===
Pos	Team	Pld	W	L	PF	PA	PD	Pts	Qualification
1	London Lions (C)	36	33	3	3376	2935	+441	66	Playoffs
2	Cheshire Phoenix	36	23	13	3334	3148	+186	46	Playoffs
3	Caledonia Gladiators	36	23	13	3152	3044	+108	46	Playoffs
4	Sheffield Sharks	36	19	17	2930	2849	+81	38	Playoffs
5	Leicester Riders	36	18	18	3281	3291	−10	36	Playoffs
6	Newcastle Eagles	36	18	18	3256	3177	+79	36	Playoffs
7	Bristol Flyers	36	16	20	2925	2918	+7	32	Playoffs
8	Surrey Scorchers	36	14	22	2955	3092	−137	28	Playoffs
9	Manchester Giants	36	9	27	2920	3311	−391	18	
10	Plymouth City Patriots	36	7	29	2887	3251	−364	14	

Updated to match(es) played on 21 April 2024. Source: BBC Sport
(C) Champions

The BBL tie-breaker system as outlined in the BBL Rules and Regulations states that in the case of an identical win–loss record, the results in games played between the teams will determine order of seeding.

Leader and qualification to playoffs
Qualification to playoffs
Last place

2023–24 BBL Championship
Team ╲ Round	1	2	3	4	5	6	7	8	9	10	11	12	13	14	15	16	17	18	19	20	21	22	23	24	25	26	27
Bristol Flyers	4	4	8	4	3	2	2	2	3	4	6	6	4	5	6	6	7	7	7	8	7	7	8	7	7	7	7
Caledonia Gladiators	3	6	6	6	6	4	3	4	4	5	5	3	3	2	2	2	2	3	3	3	3	3	3	3	3	3	3
Cheshire Phoenix	1	3	5	3	5	3	4	3	2	2	2	2	2	3	3	3	3	2	2	2	2	2	2	2	2	2	2
Leicester Riders	10	7	3	2	2	5	5	5	6	7	7	7	7	7	7	7	4	4	5	4	5	5	5	5	6	5	5
London Lions	2	1	1	1	1	1	1	1	1	1	1	1	1	1	1	1	1	1	1	1	1	1	1	1	1	1	1
Manchester Giants	8	10	7	8	8	8	8	9	9	9	9	9	9	9	9	9	9	9	9	9	9	9	9	9	10	9	9
Newcastle Eagles	5	2	2	7	7	7	7	7	7	6	4	5	6	4	5	4	6	5	4	5	4	4	4	4	4	6	5
Plymouth City Patriots	7	9	9	9	9	10	10	10	10	10	10	10	10	10	10	10	10	10	10	10	10	10	10	10	9	10	10
Sheffield Sharks	6	5	4	5	4	6	6	6	5	3	3	4	5	6	4	5	5	6	6	6	6	6	6	6	5	4	4
Surrey Scorchers	9	8	10	10	10	9	9	8	8	8	8	8	8	8	8	8	8	8	8	7	8	8	7	8	8	8	8

Updated to match(es) played on 21 April 2024. Source: BBL.org.uk

=== EuroCup ladder ===
Pos	Team	Pld	W	L	PF	PA	PD	Qualification
1	(France) Paris Basketball	18	17	1	1754	1401	+353	Advance to quarterfinals
2	(Israel) Hapoel Shlomo Tel Aviv	18	13	5	1729	1600	+129	Advance to quarterfinals
3	(United Kingdom) London Lions	18	12	6	1608	1546	+62	Advance to eighthfinals
4	(Ukraine) Prometey	18	10	8	1598	1574	+24	Advance to eighthfinals
5	(Spain) Joventut Badalona	18	10	8	1517	1503	+14	Advance to eighthfinals
6	(Turkey) Beşiktaş Emlakjet	18	9	9	1400	1428	−28	Advance to eighthfinals
7	(Lithuania) Wolves	18	8	10	1462	1550	−88	
8	(Italy) Umana Reyer Venezia	18	8	10	1507	1538	−31	
9	(Germany) Veolia Towers Hamburg	18	2	16	1478	1762	−284	
10	(Slovenia) Cedevita Olimpija	18	1	17	1509	1660	−151	

Source: EuroCup
Rules for classification: All points scored in extra period(s) were not counted in the standings, nor for any tie-break situation.

== Game log ==
=== BBL Championships ===
2023–24 game log
Total: 33–3 (Home: 16–2; Road: 17–1)
September: 4–0 (Home: 2–0; Road: 2–0)

Game	Date	Team	Score	High points	High rebounds	High assists	Location Attendance	Record
1	16 September	@ Surrey	W 61–83	Olaseni, Phillip (13)	Gabriel Olaseni (10)	C.Morgan, Kaboza (4)	Surrey Sports Park; 850	1–0
2	21 September	Caledonia	W 93–65	Gabriel Olaseni (14)	Gabriel Olaseni (10)	Grantham, Soluade (4)	Copper Box Arena; 1,431	2–0
3	23 September	@ Manchester	W 76–115	M.Morgan, Nelson (18)	Josh Sharma (6)	Tarik Phillip (8)	National Basketball Performance Centre; 800	3–0
4	28 September	Bristol	W 98–84	Matt Morgan (25)	Grantham, Olaseni (7)	three players (5)	Copper Box Arena; 1,494	4–0

October: 7–0 (Home: 4–0; Road: 3–0)

Game	Date	Team	Score	High points	High rebounds	High assists	Location Attendance	Record
5	1 October	@ Cheshire	W 82–91	Matt Morgan (33)	Matt Morgan (8)	M.Morgan, Olaseni (3)	Cheshire Oaks Arena; 200	5–0
6	8 October	Manchester	W 94–89	Matt Morgan (30)	Tarik Phillip (8)	Jordan Taylor (7)	Copper Box Arena; 2,545	6–0
7	13 October	Cheshire	W 99–80	Conor Morgan (17)	Conor Morgan (8)	Luke Nelson (10)	Copper Box Arena; 1,778	7–0
8	16 October	Newcastle	W 109–104 (OT)	Matt Morgan (30)	Gabriel Olaseni (9)	Luke Nelson (6)	Copper Box Arena; 822	8–0
9	20 October	@ Sheffield	W 76–92	Conor Morgan (19)	Ciaran Sandy (9)	M.Morgan, Nelson (5)	Canon Medical Arena n/a	9–0
10	22 October	Surrey	W 82–70	Conor Morgan (17)	Conor Morgan (8)	Grantham, Phillip (6)	Copper Box Arena; 3,258	10–0
11	27 October	@ Newcastle	W 86–99	Conor Morgan (17)	Gabriel Olaseni (10)	Gabriel Olaseni (9)	Vertu Motors Arena n/a	11–0

November: 3–2 (Home: 1–1; Road: 2–1)

Game	Date	Team	Score	High points	High rebounds	High assists	Location Attendance	Record
12	3 November	Bristol	W 95–67	Matt Morgan (19)	Gabriel Olaseni (7)	Morayo Soluade (6)	Copper Box Arena; 2,300	12–0
13	5 November	@ Plymouth	L 94–70	Bradley Kaboza (21)	Donte Grantham (7)	Morayo Soluade (4)	Plymouth Pavilions n/a	12–1
14	10 November	@ Leicester	W 95–102	Donte Grantham (22)	Donte Grantham (11)	Jordan Taylor (5)	Leicester Arena n/a	13–1
15	19 November	@ Manchester	W 84–92	Matt Morgan (32)	Josh Sharma (9)	Matt Morgan (6)	National Basketball Performance Centre n/a	14–1
16	23 November	Newcastle	L 80–102	Kareem Queeley (13)	Conor Morgan (6)	Jordan Taylor (7)	Copper Box Arena; 1,236	14–2

December: 7–1 (Home: 5–1; Road: 2–0)

Game	Date	Team	Score	High points	High rebounds	High assists	Location Attendance	Record
17	1 December	@ Leicester	W 79–89	Conor Morgan (19)	C.Morgan, Sharma (7)	Jordan Taylor (8)	Leicester Arena n/a	15–2
18	3 December	Caledonia	L 94–100 (OT)	Gabriel Olaseni (26)	Conor Morgan (6)	Jordan Taylor (8)	Copper Box Arena n/a	15–3
19	8 December	Plymouth	W 91–84	Matt Morgan (27)	Ciaran Sandy (8)	Jordan Taylor (5)	Copper Box Arena; 1,304	16–3
20	10 December	Leicester	W 100–62	Conor Morgan (21)	C.Morgan, Sharma (7)	Tarik Phillip (5)	Copper Box Arena; 1,447	17–3
21	15 December	Cheshire	W 102–95	Matt Morgan (28)	Jordan Taylor (5)	Jordan Taylor (9)	Copper Box Arena; 1,279	18–3
22	17 December	Manchester	W 99–91 (OT)	Matt Morgan (31)	Matt Morgan (11)	Jordan Taylor (7)	Copper Box Arena; 1,731	19–3
23	24 December	Sheffield	W 83–64	Conor Morgan (15)	Conor Morgan (10)	Jordan Taylor (5)	Copper Box Arena; 2,223	20–3
24	29 December	@ Caledonia	W 79–87	Gabriel Olaseni (18)	Conor Morgan (11)	Jordan Taylor (8)	Playsport Arena; 1,600	21–3

January: 1–0 (Home: 0–0; Road: 1–0)

Game	Date	Team	Score	High points	High rebounds	High assists	Location Attendance	Record
25	1 January	@ Surrey	W 80–85	Gabriel Olaseni (25)	C.Morgan, Olaseni (8)	Luke Nelson (9)	Surrey Sports Park n/a	22–3

February: 5–0 (Home: 2–0; Road: 3–0)

Game	Date	Team	Score	High points	High rebounds	High assists	Location Attendance	Record
26	2 February	@ Newcastle	W 87–105	Donte Grantham (18)	Donte Grantham (8)	Nwaba, Queeley (5)	Vertu Motors Arena; 2,700	23–3
27	4 February	Plymouth	W 105–84	Matt Morgan (19)	Kareem Queeley (6)	Tarik Phillip (7)	Copper Box Arena n/a	24–3
28	8 February	Sheffield	W 84–73	Donte Grantham (20)	Donte Grantham (10)	Gabriel Olaseni (5)	Copper Box Arena n/a	25–3
29	11 February	@ Sheffield	W 79–89	Conor Morgan (20)	Tarik Phillip (9)	three players (5)	Canon Medical Arena n/a	26–3
30	17 February	@ Bristol	W 93–101	Matt Morgan (31)	Conor Morgan (11)	Tarik Phillip (6)	SGS College Arena; 750	27–3

March: 2–0 (Home: 1–0; Road: 1–0)

Game	Date	Team	Score	High points	High rebounds	High assists	Location Attendance	Record
31	3 March	Leicester	W 105–89	Sam Dekker (17)	Gabriel Olaseni (6)	Donte Grantham (6)	Copper Box Arena; 4,231	28–3
32	8 March	@ Caledonia	W 76–82	Matt Morgan (22)	Gabriel Olaseni (19)	Matt Morgan (5)	Playsport Arena; 1,600	29–3
All-Star Game

April: 4–0 (Home: 1–0; Road: 3–0)

Game	Date	Team	Score	High points	High rebounds	High assists	Location Attendance	Record
33	7 April	@ Bristol	W 71–86	Gabriel Olaseni (21)	Gabriel Olaseni (10)	M.Morgan, Phillip (5)	SGS College Arena; 750	30–3
34	12 April	@ Plymouth	W 57–93	Conor Morgan (20)	Josh Sharma (11)	Tarik Phillip (7)	Plymouth Pavilions n/a	31–3
35	18 April	Surrey	W 97–85	Matt Morgan (24)	Josh Sharma (7)	M.Morgan, Phillip (5)	Copper Box Arena; 2,243	32–3
36	21 April	@ Cheshire	W 92–105	Matt Morgan (30)	David Nwaba (9)	Matt Morgan (5)	Cheshire Oaks Arena n/a	33–3

2023–24 season schedule

=== EuroCup ===
2023–24 game log
Total: 12–6 (Home: 4–5; Road: 8–1)
October: 3–1 (Home: 1–1; Road: 2–0)

Game	Date	Team	Score	High points	High rebounds	High assists	Location Attendance	Record
1	4 October	Venezia	W 76–69	Donte Grantham (23)	Grantham, Olaseni (7)	Jordan Taylor (7)	Copper Box Arena; 1,287	1–0
2	10 October	@ Humburg	W 94–100	Matt Morgan (21)	Conor Morgan (9)	Matt Morgan (6)	Edel-optics.de Arena; 1,279	2–0
3	18 October	@ Prometey	W 89–99	Matt Morgan (21)	Donte Grantham (11)	Tarik Phillip (8)	Arena Riga; 1,357	3–0
4	24 October	Paris	L 102–106 (2OT)	Matt Morgan (26)	Gabriel Olaseni (11)	Tarik Phillip (9)	Copper Box Arena; 6,152	3–1

November: 4–1 (Home: 1–1; Road: 3–0)

Game	Date	Team	Score	High points	High rebounds	High assists	Location Attendance	Record
5	2 November	Hapoel Tel Aviv	L 90–98	Matt Morgan (22)	Donte Grantham (12)	Jordan Taylor (8)	Copper Box Arena; 85	3–2
6	8 November	@ Joventut Badalona	W 76–87	Gabriel Olaseni (21)	Gabriel Olaseni (9)	Olaseni, Phillip (5)	Pavelló Olímpic de Badalona; 2,979	4–2
7	15 November	@ Beşiktaş	W 80–83	Gabriel Olaseni (24)	Matt Morgan (8)	Matt Morgan (7)	Akatlar Arena; 2,882	5–2
8	22 November	Cedevita Olimpija	W 101–95	Matt Morgan (24)	Gabriel Olaseni (12)	Jordan Taylor (8)	Copper Box Arena; 3,298	6–2
9	28 November	@ Wolves	W 87–101	Conor Morgan (22)	Donte Grantham (8)	Jordan Taylor (5)	Avia Solutions Group Arena; 3,724	7–2

December: 2–2 (Home: 1–1; Road: 1–1)

Game	Date	Team	Score	High points	High rebounds	High assists	Location Attendance	Record
10	5 December	@ Venezia	W 91–95	Gabriel Olaseni (23)	Gabriel Olaseni (12)	C.Morgan, Taylor (4)	Palasport Taliercio; 2,636	8–2
11	13 December	Humburg	L 81–83	Gabriel Olaseni (24)	Gabriel Olaseni (9)	Luke Nelson (5)	Copper Box Arena; 1,764	8–3
12	20 December	Prometey	W 89–88	Gabriel Olaseni (19)	Gabriel Olaseni (10)	Matt Morgan (7)	Copper Box Arena; 3,378	9–3
13	26 December	@ Paris	L 94–77	Matt Morgan (18)	Gabriel Olaseni (7)	Jordan Taylor (4)	Halle Georges Carpentier; 2,764	9–4

January: 2–2 (Home: 1–1; Road: 1–1)

Game	Date	Team	Score	High points	High rebounds	High assists	Location Attendance	Record
14	9 January	@ Hapoel Tel Aviv	W 96–100	David Nwaba (17)	Gabriel Olaseni (10)	Tarik Phillip (7)	Aleksandar Nikolić Hall closed event	10–4
15	17 January	Joventut Badalona	L 80–82	Matt Morgan (20)	David Nwaba (8)	Conor Morgan (5)	Copper Box Arena; 2,163	10–5
16	24 January	Beşiktaş	W 93–72	Matt Morgan (20)	Grantham, Olaseni (6)	Matt Morgan (4)	Copper Box Arena; 1,357	11–5
17	31 January	@ Cedevita Olimpija	W 85–92	Matt Morgan (26)	Gabriel Olaseni (7)	Matt Morgan (6)	Arena Stožice; 2,317	12–5

February: 0–1 (Home: 0–1; Road: 0–0)

Game	Date	Team	Score	High points	High rebounds	High assists	Location Attendance	Record
18	7 February	Wolves	L 80–85	M.Morgan, Nwaba (16)	Gabriel Olaseni (8)	Matt Morgan (4)	Copper Box Arena; 4,119	12–6

2023–24 eurocup schedule

=== EuroCup Playoffs ===
2024 playoff game log
Total: 2–2 (Home: 1–1; Road: 1–1)
Eightfinals: 1–0 (Home: 1–0; Road: 0–0)

Game	Date	Team	Score	High points	High rebounds	High assists	Location Attendance	Series
1	6 March	Türk Telekom	W 100–77	David Nwaba (19)	Gabriel Olaseni (8)	Tarik Phillip (5)	Copper Box Arena; 3,141	1–0

Quarterfinals: 1–0 (Home: 0–0; Road: 1–0)

Game	Date	Team	Score	High points	High rebounds	High assists	Location Attendance	Series
1	13 March	@ U-BT Cluj-Napoca	W 79–91	Sam Dekker (21)	David Nwaba (8)	Donte Grantham (4)	Bt-Arena; 10,000	1–0

Semifinals: 0–2 (Home: 0–1; Road: 0–1)

Game	Date	Team	Score	High points	High rebounds	High assists	Location Attendance	Series
1	26 March	@ Paris	L 99–86	David Nwaba (24)	Olaseni, Nwaba (5)	Tarik Phillip (8)	Adidas Arena; 5,425	0–1
2	29 March	Paris	L 85–93	Matt Morgan (25)	David Nwaba (9)	David Nwaba (4)	Copper Box Arena; 5,486	0–2

2024 eurocup playoff schedule

=== BBL Trophy ===
2024 BBL Trophy game log
Total: 4–2 (Home: 3–1; Road: 1–1)
January: 4–2 (Home: 3–1; Road: 1–1)

Game	Date	Team	Score	High points	High rebounds	High assists	Location Attendance	Record
1	4 January	Newcastle	W 99–77	C.Morgan, Nelson (20)	C.Morgan, Sandy (9)	Gabriel Olaseni (9)	Copper Box Arena n/a	1–0
2	7 January	Leicester	W 89–74	Donte Grantham (16)	Ciaran Sandy (11)	Tarik Phillip (9)	Copper Box Arena; 2,960	2–0
3	12 January	@ Manchester	W 75–106	Matt Morgan (22)	Tarik Phillip (7)	Tarik Phillip (7)	National Basketball Performance Centre n/a	3–0
4	19 January	@ Bristol	L 94–72	Bradley Kaboza (18)	three players (6)	Donte Grantham (5)	SGS College Arena n/a	3–1
5	27 January	Caledonia	W 85–75	Josh Sharma (19)	Gabriel Olaseni (15)	Matt Morgan (4)	Arena Birmingham n/a	4–1
6	28 January	Cheshire	L 82–98	David Nwaba (18)	Donte Grantham (9)	Donte Grantham (3)	Arena Birmingham n/a	4–2

2023–24 trophy schedule

=== BBL Playoffs ===
2024 playoff game log
Total: 5–0 (Home: 3–0; Road: 2–0)
Quarterfinals: 2–0 (Home: 1–0; Road: 1–0)

Game	Date	Team	Score	High points	High rebounds	High assists	Location Attendance	Series
1	28 April	Surrey	W 80–65	Gabriel Olaseni (16)	Gabriel Olaseni (7)	Matt Morgan (7)	Copper Box Arena n/a	1–0
2	3 May	@ Surrey	W 96–105	Matt Morgan (22)	Gabriel Olaseni (8)	Jordan Taylor (7)	Surrey Sports Park n/a	2–0

Semifinals: 2–0 (Home: 1–0; Road: 1–0)

Game	Date	Team	Score	High points	High rebounds	High assists	Location Attendance	Series
3	10 May	@ Newcastle	W 75–106	David Nwaba (19)	Gabriel Olaseni (11)	Tarik Phillip (8)	Vertu Motors Arena	1–0
4	12 May	Newcastle	W 94–81	M.Morgan, Nwaba (18)	Donte Grantham (11)	M.Morgan, Phillip (5)	Copper Box Arena; 1,740	2–0

Playoff final: 1–0 (Home: 1–0; Road: 0–0)

Game	Date	Team	Score	High points	High rebounds	High assists	Location Attendance	Series
5	19 May	Cheshire	W 88–85	Sam Dekker (17)	Sam Dekker (10)	Tarik Phillip (7)	The O2 Arena n/a	1–0

2024 playoff schedule

== Transactions ==
=== Re-signed ===
Player	Signed
Sam Dekker	
Josh Sharma	
Luke Nelson	
Morayo Soluade	
Jordan Taylor	
Tarik Phillip	
Kareem Queeley	
Bradley Kaboza	

=== Additions ===
Player	Signed	Former team
Gabriel Olaseni		Darüşşafaka
Conor Morgan		Bahçeşehir Koleji
Matt Morgan		Le Mans
Donte Grantham		SLUC Nancy Basket
Ciaran Sandy		Mercyhurst Lakers
Rokas Gustys		Fundación CB Granada
Joshua Djanogly		Wolfenbüttel
David Nwaba	4 January 2023	Motor City Cruise

=== Subtractions ===
Player	Reason left	New team
Joshua Ward-Hibbert	Free agent	Newcastle Eagles
Vojtěch Hruban	Free agent	Cholet Basket
Tomislav Zubčić	Free agent	Napoli Basket
Aaron Best	Free agent	Trefl Sopot
Miye Oni	Free agent	Osceola Magic
Rokas Gustys	Released (NRP)	TBC

== See also ==
- 2023–24 British Basketball League season
- London Lions
