= British Basketball League All-Star Game =

British annual basketball event

BBL All-Star Game
- Status: Active
- Inaugurated: 1991-92
- Most recent: 2023-24
- Organizer: British Basketball League

The BBL All-Star Game was the annual basketball All-Star Game of the British Basketball League which lasted from 1989 until 2002 and then revived from 2009 until 2011. The event was based on the original NBA concept, including a slam dunk and a three-point shootout contest and it was broadcast for several seasons in the United States as it featured a great number of American professional players who played in the BBL. The main part of the event was the game between the North and South All-Stars. In the mid-90s it used to be known as the Dairylea Dunkers All-Star Game and in its last editions as NIA All-Star Game.

Barbados player Nigel Lloyd holds the record with the most All-Star Games with 10 consecutive picks from 1993 until the last one in 2002, the year he retired from professional basketball at the age of 40, after 18 full season in British basketball. The coach with the most appearances is Nick Nurse who holds the record with six, coaching both North and South sides.

== Background ==
In 1987 the BBL was founded as a breakaway competition formed by 15 teams who previously competed in the English National League and the Scottish National League following the NBA's franchise system. The purpose of the movement was to professionalise and promote the sport in Great Britain and catch up with the top European leagues like the ACB, the Lega Basket Serie A and the LNB Pro A who had already created the All-Star Game event. Therefore, after a successful first season sponsored by Carlsberg the BBL decided to launch an All-Star Game designed on the NBA pattern.

== History ==
Most of the games took place on Northern soil in England, where the crowd interest for basketball was higher. By the first demise of the event, the South led in total wins the North with a 7–6 score. After 2002 were persistent calls from former British basketball players to bring the event back in the last decade. In the beginning the busy schedule of the clubs kept those thoughts away from reality, but the All-Star Game returned in the 2008–09 season and lasted for 3 seasons, featuring now the Great Britain All-Stars against the Rest of the World All Stars game. The slam dunk contest was moved to the BBL Cup final match, during its interval.

== List of games ==
Bold: Team that won the game.

Season	Date	Arena	City	Team	Score	Team	MVP
1991–92	March, 1992			**Northern All-Stars**	defeated	Southern All-Stars	(United States) John Trezvant
1992–93	March, 1993			**Northern All-Stars**	defeated	Southern All-Stars	(United States) John Trezvant (2)
1993-94	March, 1994	Granby Halls	Leicester	Northern All-Stars	140-**148**	**Southern All-Stars**	(United States) Tyrone Thomas
1994–95							
1995–96							(United States) (United Kingdom) Tony Dorsey
1996–97							
1997-98	March 22, 1998	Sheffield Arena	Sheffield	Northern All-Stars	168-**175**	**Southern All-Stars**	(United States) John McCord
1998-99	February 7, 1999	Utilita Arena Newcastle	Newcastle	Northern All-Stars	156-**158**	**Southern All-Stars**	(United States) Ted Berry
1999-00	February 5, 2000	Manchester Arena	Manchester	Northern All-Stars	177-**180**	**Southern All-Stars**	(Trinidad and Tobago) (United Kingdom) Shawn Myers
2000-01	January 20, 2001	Utilita Arena Newcastle	Newcastle	**Northern All-Stars**	**161**-148	Southern All-Stars	(United States) Tony Windless
2001-02	January 20, 2002	Utilita Arena Newcastle	Newcastle	Northern All-Stars	142-**196**	**Southern All-Stars**	(United States) (United Kingdom) Rico Alderson
2002-2008	Not held						
2008-09	May 5, 2009	Arena Birmingham	Birmingham	Great Britain All-Stars	117-**124**	**Rest of the World All-Stars**	(United Kingdom) Chris Sanders
2009-10	May 9, 2010	Arena Birmingham	Birmingham	Great Britain All-Stars	94-**110**	**Rest of the World All-Stars**	(United States) Mike Cook
2010-11	April 30, 2011	Arena Birmingham	Birmingham	Great Britain All-Stars	115-**119**	**Rest of the World All-Stars**	(United States) Kadiri Richard
2023–24	March 17, 2024	Copper Box Arena	London	North	116-**149**	**South**	(United States) Teddy Allen

== Wins by team ==
=== 1989-2002 and 2023- ===
Team	Wins
Northern All Stars	7
Southern All Stars	7

== Slam Dunk Contest ==
Season	Slam Dunk Champion	Team	Runner-up	Team
1990-91	(United Kingdom) Leo Rogers	Worthing Bears		
1992-93	(United States) John Trezvant	Leicester Riders	(United Kingdom) Leo Rogers	Thames Valley Tigers
1993-94	(United States) John Trezvant (2)	Leicester Riders	(United States) Charlie Mandt	Derby Bucks
2009-10	(France) Guy Dupuy	Milton Keynes Lions	(United States) Kadiri Richard	Newcastle Eagles
2010-11	(United States) Kadiri Richard	Newcastle Eagles	(United Kingdom) Stefan Gill	Milton Keynes Lions
2011-12	(United Kingdom) Nathan Schall	Milton Keynes Lions		
2013-14	(United Kingdom) Joe Ikhinmwin	London Lions		

== Topscorers ==
Season	Player	Points	Team
1994	(United States) Tyrone Thomas	26	Birmingham Bullets
1998	(United States) John White	32	Greater London Leopards
1999	(United States) Ted Berry	29	Edinburgh Rocks
2000	(United States) Darrian Evans	33	Derby Storm
2001	(United States) Tony Christie	29	Thames Valley Tigers
2002	(United States) John Thomas	26	Chester Jets
2009	(United States) Chris Sanders	30	Sheffield Sharks
2010	(United States) Mike Cook	31	Sheffield Sharks
2011	(United Kingdom) Anthony Rowe	22	Plymouth City Patriots
2013			
2014			
2024	(United States) Teddy Allen	31	Leicester Riders

== Players with most appearances ==
Player	All-Star	Editions	MVP
(Barbados) (United Kingdom) Nigel Lloyd	10	1993-2002	-
(United Kingdom) Peter Scantlebury	8	1990-1997	-
(United States) Tony Windless	7	1995-2001	2001
(United States) (United Kingdom) Tony Dorsey	6	1995-2000	1996
(United Kingdom) Karl Brown	6	1991–1995, 1997	-
(United Kingdom) Kevin St. Kitts	6	1990, 1991, 1992, 1993, 1994, 1995	-
(United States) Ted Berry	5	1998-2002	1999
(United Kingdom) Steve Bucknall	5	1991, 1995, 1996, 2000, 2001	-
(United States) Jason Siemon	5	1994, 1995, 1996, 1999, 2002	-
(United Kingdom) Robert Skip Youngblood	5	1999, 1998, 1997, 1996 (DNP), 1995	-
(United States) (United Kingdom) Terrell Myers	4	1999, 2000, 2001, 2002	-

== The new era of All-Star Games ==
In the 2012–13 season the BBL in collaboration with the Irish league launched a joint All-Star Game featuring the best players from both leagues. The event took place on March 31, 2013. The following 2013–14 season the All-Star Game featured a battle between England and Scotland selects from the BBL.
