= 2023–24 British Basketball League season =

37th season of the British Basketball League

2023–24 BBL season
- League: British Basketball League
- Season: 2023–24
- Dates: 14 September 2023 – 19 May 2024
- Games played: 180
- Teams: 10
- TV partners: Great Britain: Sky Sports; Online: YouTube

Regular season
- League champions: London Lions (3rd title)
- BBL Trophy: Cheshire Phoenix (6th title)
- Season MVP: (United States) Matt Morgan (London)

Playoffs
- Champions: London Lions (2nd title)
- Runners-up: Cheshire Phoenix
- Finals MVP: (United States) Sam Dekker (London)

BBL seasons
- ← 2022–23 2024–25 (SLB) →

The 2023–24 BBL season was the 37th and final season of the British Basketball League, the top British professional basketball league, since its establishment in 1987. The season featured 10 teams from across England and Scotland.

== Teams ==
Locations of the 2023–24 BBL teams

=== Arenas and locations ===
Team	Location	Arena	Capacity
Bristol Flyers	Bristol	SGS College Arena	750
Caledonia Gladiators	East Kilbride	Playsport Arena	1,800
Cheshire Phoenix	Ellesmere Port	Cheshire Oaks Arena	1,400
Leicester Riders	Leicester	Mattioli Arena	2,400
London Lions	London	Copper Box Arena	6,000
Manchester Giants	Manchester	National Basketball Centre	2,000
Newcastle Eagles	Newcastle upon Tyne	Vertu Motors Arena	2,800
Plymouth City Patriots	Plymouth	Plymouth Pavilions	1,500
Sheffield Sharks	Sheffield	Canon Medical Arena	2,500
Surrey Scorchers	Guildford	Surrey Sports Park	1,000

=== Personnel and sponsorship ===
Team	Head coach	Captain
Bristol Flyers	(Greece) Andreas Kapoulas	(England) Raphell Thomas-Edwards
Caledonia Gladiators	(Scotland) Gareth Murray	(Bosnia and Herzegovina) Fahro Alihodžić
Cheshire Phoenix	(England) Ben Thomas	(United States) Maceo Jack
Leicester Riders	(United States) Rob Paternostro	(Canada) Kimbal Mackenzie
London Lions	(Serbia) Petar Božić	(United States) Sam Dekker
Manchester Giants	(United States) Brian Semonian	(England) Callum Jones
Newcastle Eagles	(England) Marc Steutel	(England) Darius Defoe
Plymouth City Patriots	(England) Paul James	(Albania) Elvisi Dusha
Sheffield Sharks	(United States) Atiba Lyons	(United States) Bennett Koch
Surrey Scorchers	(England) Lloyd Gardner	(England) Tayo Ogedengbe

=== Coaching changes ===
Team	Outgoing coach	Manner of departure	Date of vacancy	Position in table	Incoming coach	Date of appointment
Manchester Giants	(England) Vince Macaulay	End of contract	26 May 2023	Pre season	(United States) Brian Semonian	26 July 2023
London Lions	(United States) Ryan Schmidt	Signed by Atlanta Hawks	18 July 2023	Pre season	(Serbia) Petar Božić	17 August 2023

== BBL Championship ==
The BBL Championship maintained the four-game series format, reintroduced for the 2022–23 season, for a 36-game regular season.

=== Standings ===
Pos	Team	Pld	W	L	PF	PA	PD	Pts	Qualification
1	London Lions (C)	36	33	3	3376	2935	+441	66	Playoffs
2	Cheshire Phoenix	36	23	13	3334	3148	+186	46	Playoffs
3	Caledonia Gladiators	36	23	13	3152	3044	+108	46	Playoffs
4	Sheffield Sharks	36	19	17	2930	2849	+81	38	Playoffs
5	Leicester Riders	36	18	18	3281	3291	−10	36	Playoffs
6	Newcastle Eagles	36	18	18	3256	3177	+79	36	Playoffs
7	Bristol Flyers	36	16	20	2925	2918	+7	32	Playoffs
8	Surrey Scorchers	36	14	22	2955	3092	−137	28	Playoffs
9	Manchester Giants	36	9	27	2920	3311	−391	18	
10	Plymouth City Patriots	36	7	29	2887	3251	−364	14	

Updated to match(es) played on 21 April 2024. Source: BBC Sport
(C) Champions

=== Results ===
Home \ Away	BRI	CAL	CHE	LEI	LON	MAN	NEW	PLY	SHE	SUR
Bristol Flyers	—	94–77	74–70	74–92	93–101	68–74	74–81	82–65	67–65	81–94
Bristol Flyers	—	75–80	76–78	108–71	71–86	87–67	97–83	83–89	78–76	74–80
Caledonia Gladiators	85–82	—	83–92	84–83	79–87	86–80	73–82	99–83	87–83	86–79
Caledonia Gladiators	78–72	—	116–110	93–97	76–82	101–68	98–80	96–81	73–64	84–75
Cheshire Phoenix	96–73	82–92	—	102–96	82–92	83–67	91–113	89–77	70–75	100–80
Cheshire Phoenix	75–89	100–93	—	87–83	92–105	88–92	96–85	95–73	93–78	86–81
Leicester Riders	81–87	96–90	86–110	—	95–102	94–79	111–88	88–81	103–75	91–74
Leicester Riders	77–89	90–115	101–93	—	79–89	89–94	91–96	102–81	108–94	94–86
London Lions	98–84	93–65	99–80	100–62	—	94–89	109–104	91–84	83–64	82–70
London Lions	95–67	94–100	102–95	105–89	—	99–91	80–102	105–84	84–73	97–85
Manchester Giants	87–91	79–97	88–116	94–80	76–115	—	85–106	91–90	64–87	87–85
Manchester Giants	103–80	87–106	93–103	73–86	84–92	—	91–89	79–93	68–99	78–86
Newcastle Eagles	71–89	105–93	73–80	85–92	86–99	97–85	—	98–82	79–72	88–93
Newcastle Eagles	86–90	84–90	104–89	95–90	87–105	109–77	—	95–82	77–87	125–84
Plymouth City Patriots	63–92	72–82	79–102	109–93	94–70	73–77	68–95	—	92–87	105–110
Plymouth City Patriots	68–92	87–84	80–112	111–121	57–93	77–68	80–92	—	55–67	63–65
Sheffield Sharks	88–78	96–78	85–104	91–84	76–92	92–73	86–56	97–60	—	81–78
Sheffield Sharks	76–66	69–62	92–99	85–88	79–89	86–75	91–83	98–92	—	71–62
Surrey Scorchers	80–75	72–80	101–103	84–104	61–83	98–72	87–100	71–65	67–70	—
Surrey Scorchers	82–73	89–95	73–91	88–94	80–85	89–85	90–77	94–92	82–75	—

Updated to match(es) played on 21 April 2024. Source: BBL.org.uk
Legend: Blue = home team win; Red = away team win.

=== Ladder progression ===
Leader and qualification to playoffs
Qualification to playoffs
Last place

2023–24 BBL Championship
Team ╲ Round	1	2	3	4	5	6	7	8	9	10	11	12	13	14	15	16	17	18	19	20	21	22	23	24	25	26	27
Bristol Flyers	4	4	8	4	3	2	2	2	3	4	6	6	4	5	6	6	7	7	7	8	7	7	8	7	7	7	7
Caledonia Gladiators	3	6	6	6	6	4	3	4	4	5	5	3	3	2	2	2	2	3	3	3	3	3	3	3	3	3	3
Cheshire Phoenix	1	3	5	3	5	3	4	3	2	2	2	2	2	3	3	3	3	2	2	2	2	2	2	2	2	2	2
Leicester Riders	10	7	3	2	2	5	5	5	6	7	7	7	7	7	7	7	4	4	5	4	5	5	5	5	6	5	5
London Lions	2	1	1	1	1	1	1	1	1	1	1	1	1	1	1	1	1	1	1	1	1	1	1	1	1	1	1
Manchester Giants	8	10	7	8	8	8	8	9	9	9	9	9	9	9	9	9	9	9	9	9	9	9	9	9	10	9	9
Newcastle Eagles	5	2	2	7	7	7	7	7	7	6	4	5	6	4	5	4	6	5	4	5	4	4	4	4	4	6	5
Plymouth City Patriots	7	9	9	9	9	10	10	10	10	10	10	10	10	10	10	10	10	10	10	10	10	10	10	10	9	10	10
Sheffield Sharks	6	5	4	5	4	6	6	6	5	3	3	4	5	6	4	5	5	6	6	6	6	6	6	6	5	4	4
Surrey Scorchers	9	8	10	10	10	9	9	8	8	8	8	8	8	8	8	8	8	8	8	7	8	8	7	8	8	8	8

Updated to match(es) played on 21 April 2024. Source: BBL.org.uk

== BBL Trophy ==
The 37th BBL Trophy takes a new format for the 2023–24 season. Wholly played within the month of January and during a break in Championship matches, two five team groups were randomly drawn from the 10 member clubs. Each club will play the other once, home or away. The top two teams from each group will qualify for the Final Four weekend at Arena Birmingham, to be played on 28 and 29 January 2023.

=== Group A ===
Pos	Team	Pld	W	L	PF	PA	PD	Pts	Qualification	CHE	CAL	SUR	SHE	PLY
1	Cheshire Phoenix	4	4	0	385	304	+81	8	Semifinals	—	—	—	78–70	102–74
2	Caledonia Gladiators	4	2	2	357	334	+23	4	Semifinals	97–100	—	99–74	—	—
3	Surrey Scorchers	4	2	2	293	338	−45	4		63–105	—	—	91–71	—
4	Sheffield Sharks	4	1	3	290	322	−32	2		—	72–80	—	—	77–73
5	Plymouth City Patriots	4	1	3	298	325	−27	2		—	88–81	63–65	—	—

Source: BBL
Legend: Blue = home team win; Red = away team win.

=== Group B ===
Pos	Team	Pld	W	L	PF	PA	PD	Pts	Qualification	LON	LEI	NEW	BRI	MAN
1	London Lions	4	3	1	360	336	+24	6	Semifinals	—	89–74	99–77	—	—
2	Leicester Riders	4	3	1	374	336	+38	6	Semifinals	—	—	—	95–74	104–88
3	Newcastle Eagles	4	2	2	338	360	−22	4		—	85–101	—	—	92–78
4	Bristol Flyers	4	2	2	355	331	+24	4		94–72	—	82–84	—	—
5	Manchester Giants	4	0	4	337	401	−64	0		91–100	—	—	80–105	—

Source: BBL
Legend: Blue = home team win; Red = away team win.

=== Final Four ===
Sky Sports

27 January 2024
15:30

boxscore
report

London Lions	85–75	Caledonia Gladiators
Scoring by quarter: 19–28, 25–24, 17–9, 24–14
Pts: Sharma 19; Rebs: Olaseni 15; Asts: M.Morgan 4		Pts: Bothwell 17; Rebs: Bothwell, Whelan 6 Asts: Whelan 6

Arena Birmingham, Birmingham
Attendance: n/a

Sky Sports

27 January 2024
18:00

boxscore
report

Cheshire Phoenix	92–91	Leicester Riders
Scoring by quarter: 18–22, 28–12, 23–23, 23–34
Pts: Rai 27; Rebs: Rai 11; Asts: Rideau 13		Pts: Allen 20; Rebs: Thomas 12; Asts: Mackenzie, Shelton 4

Arena Birmingham, Birmingham
Attendance: n/a

=== Trophy Final ===
Sky Sports

28 January 2024
15:30

boxscore
report

London Lions	82–98	Cheshire Phoenix
Scoring by quarter: 27–30, 22–15, 12–22, 21–31
Trophy MVP: Laquincy Rideau
Pts: Nwaba 18; Rebs: Grantham 9 Asts: Grantham 3		Pts: Rideau 25; Rebs: Rai 11; Asts: Rai 4

Arena Birmingham, Birmingham
Attendance: n/a

== Playoffs ==
The 2024 BBL Playoffs were played on April and May 2024, consisting of four best-of-three quarterfinal series, two best-of-three semifinal series and the Playoff Final. In the quarterfinals, semifinals, the higher seed hosts the first and third games. The Playoff Final was played at The O2 Arena, London.

=== Playoff bracket ===
Quarterfinals
1	London Lions	80	105	—
8	Surrey Scorchers	65	96	—
3	Caledonia Gladiators	78	71	—
6	Newcastle Eagles	97	94	—
2	Cheshire Phoenix	91	91	—
7	Bristol Flyers	90	77	—
4	Sheffield Sharks	81	77	86
5	Leicester Riders	84	74	69

Semifinals
1	London Lions	106	94	—
6	Newcastle Eagles	75	81	—
2	Cheshire Phoenix	89	92	—
4	Sheffield Sharks	83	73	—

Playoff Final
1	London Lions	88
2	Cheshire Phoenix	85

*Note: Pairings are reseeded after quarterfinals.

=== Quarterfinals ===
==== (1) London Lions vs. (8) Surrey Scorchers ====
YouTube

28 April 2024
15:15

boxscore
report

London Lions	80–65	Surrey Scorchers
Scoring by quarter: 27–11, 28–19, 18–14, 7–21
Pts: Olaseni 16; Rebs: Olaseni 7 Asts: M.Morgan 7		Pts: Lawrence 17; Rebs: Jamison 14; Asts: Jamison, Lawrence 3
London leads series, 1–0

Copper Box Arena, London
Attendance: n/a

YouTube

3 May 2024
19:30

boxscore
report

Surrey Scorchers	96–105	London Lions
Scoring by quarter: 15–26, 39–30, 16–25, 26–24
Pts: Gooden 35; Rebs: Jamison 7 Asts: Lawrence 8		Pts: M.Morgan 22; Rebs: Olaseni 8 Asts: Taylor 7
London wins series, 2–0

Surrey Sports Park, Guildford
Attendance: n/a

==== (2) Cheshire Phoenix vs. (7) Bristol Flyers ====
YouTube

28 April 2024
18:00

boxscore
report

Cheshire Phoenix	91–90	Bristol Flyers
Scoring by quarter: 27–22, 33–24, 13–15, 18–29
Pts: Rideau 22; Rebs: Jack 12; Asts: Rideau 11		Pts: Johnson, Olison 25; Rebs: Greene 9 Asts: Johnson 5
Cheshire leads series, 1–0

Cheshire Oaks Arena, Ellesmere Port
Attendance: n/a

SkySports

3 May 2024
19:45

boxscore
report

Bristol Flyers	77–91	Cheshire Phoenix
Scoring by quarter: 21–20, 14–21, 21–24, 21–26
Pts: Lucas 16; Rebs: Smith, Thomas-Edwards 8 Asts: Olison 5		Pts: Rai 34; Rebs: Rai 12; Asts: Rideau 8
Cheshire wins series, 2–0

SGS College Arena, Bristol
Attendance: n/a

==== (3) Caledonia Gladiators vs. (6) Newcastle Eagles ====
Sky Sports

26 April 2024
19:45

boxscore
report

Caledonia Gladiators	78–97	Newcastle Eagles
Scoring by quarter: 19–24, 24–21, 16–20, 19–32
Pts: Whelan 20; Rebs: Moore 6 Asts: Green 5		Pts: Johnson 31; Rebs: Austin 5 Asts: Johnson 7
Newcastle leads series, 1–0

Playsport Arena, East Kilbride
Attendance: n/a

YouTube

3 May 2024
19:30

boxscore

Newcastle Eagles	94–71	Caledonia Gladiators
Scoring by quarter: 26–18, 25–18, 18–20, 25–15
Pts: McGill 22; Rebs: Green 10; Asts: Austin, Johnson 6		Pts: Whelan 18; Rebs: Moore 9 Asts: Jimenez, Whelan 3
Newcastle wins series, 2–0

Vertu Motors Arena, Newcastle
Attendance: 2,800

==== (4) Sheffield Sharks vs. (5) Leicester Riders ====
YouTube

28 April 2024
16:00

boxscore
report

Sheffield Sharks	81–84	Leicester Riders
Scoring by quarter: 26–28, 21–10, 20–22, 14–24
Pts: Nixon 25; Rebs: Green 12; Asts: Pipkins 5		Pts: Thomas 24; Rebs: Idowu, Thomas 8 Asts: Allen 4
Leicester leads series, 1–0

Park Community Arena, Sheffield
Attendance: n/a

Sky Sports

4 May 2024
18:45

boxscore
report

Leicester Riders	74–77	Sheffield Sharks
Scoring by quarter: 22–18, 25–23, 9–19, 18–17
Pts: Allen 23; Rebs: Idowu 9 Asts: Thomas 4		Pts: Green 22; Rebs: Green 11; Asts: Nixon 7
Series tied, 1–1

Leicester Arena, Leicester
Attendance: n/a

Sky Sports

5 May 2024
15:00

boxscore
report

Sheffield Sharks	86–69	Leicester Riders
Scoring by quarter: 24–21, 22–16, 23–15, 17–17
Pts: Nixon 17; Rebs: Delpeche 9 Asts: Nichols 6		Pts: Idowu 16; Rebs: Idowu 12; Asts: Holmes 7
Sheffield wins series, 2–1

Park Community Arena, Sheffield
Attendance: n/a

=== Semifinals ===
==== (1) London Lions vs. (6) Newcastle Eagles ====
Sky Sports

10 May 2024
19:35

boxscore
report

Newcastle Eagles	75–106	London Lions
Scoring by quarter: 29–26, 20–30, 16–28, 10–22
Pts: McGill 20; Rebs: three players 6 Asts: McGill 6		Pts: Nwaba 19; Rebs: Olaseni 10; Asts: Phillip 8
London leads series, 1–0

Vertu Motors Arena, Newcastle
Attendance: n/a

Sky Sports

12 May 2024
13:35

boxscore
report

London Lions	94–81	Newcastle Eagles
Scoring by quarter: 19–20, 22–21, 23–20, 30–20
Pts: M.Morgan, Nwaba 18; Rebs: Grantham 11; Asts: M.Morgan Phillip 5		Pts: McGill 23; Rebs: Austin 6 Asts: McGill 7
London wins series, 2–0

Copper Box Arena, London
Attendance: 1,740

==== (2) Cheshire Phoenix vs. (4) Sheffield Sharks ====
YouTube

10 May 2024
19:35

boxscore
report

Cheshire Phoenix	89–83	Sheffield Sharks
Scoring by quarter: 22–22, 26–16, 14–19, 27–26
Pts: Rai 22; Rebs: Rai 9 Asts: Rai, Rideau 6		Pts: Nixon 20; Rebs: Delpeche 10; Asts: seven players 1
Cheshire leads series, 1–0

Cheshire Oaks Arena, Ellesmere Port
Attendance: n/a

YouTube

12 May 2024
16:35

boxscore
report

Sheffield Sharks	73–92	Cheshire Phoenix
Scoring by quarter: 17–19, 12–31, 24–20, 20–22
Pts: Green 17; Rebs: Green 14; Asts: Ramsey 5		Pts: Jack 20; Rebs: four players 6 Asts: Rai 8
Cheshire wins series, 2–0

Park Community Arena, Sheffield
Attendance: n/a

=== Playoff Final ===
==== (1) London Lions vs. (2) Cheshire Phoenix ====
SkySports

19 May 2024
16:15

boxscore
report

London Lions	88–85	Cheshire Phoenix
Scoring by quarter: 24–14, 28–27, 22–30, 14–14
Playoff MVP: Sam Dekker
Pts: Dekker 17; Rebs: Dekker 10; Asts: Phillip 7		Pts: Rai 21; Rebs: Rideau 12; Asts: Rideau 8

The O2 Arena, London
Attendance: n/a

== All-Star Game ==
Sky Sports

17 March 2024
15:30

boxscore
report

North All-Stars	116–149	South All-Stars
Scoring by quarter: 23–33, 33–33, 33–41, 27–45
All-Star MVP: Teddy Allen
Pts: Rideau 22; Rebs: Rideau 12; Asts: Austin Jr. 9		Pts: Allen 31; Rebs: Atwood 15; Asts: Mackenzie 11

Copper Box Arena, London
Attendance: 3,398

== Awards ==
- Most Valuable Player: Matt Morgan (London Lions)
- Play-off Final MVP: Sam Dekker (London Lions)
- Coach of the Year: Ben Thomas (Cheshire Phoenix)
- Sixth Player of the Year: Cam Christon (Cheshire Phoenix)
- Most Improved Player: Maceo Jack (Cheshire Phoenix)
- Defensive Player of the Year: Joah Sharma (London Lions)
- Community Champion of the Year: Nate Montgomery (Sheffield Sharks)

=== 2023–24 BBL Team of the Year ===
#	Player	Team
PG	Matt Morgan	London Lions
SG	Aaryn Rai	Cheshire Phoenix
SF	Teddy Allen	Leicester Riders
PF	Patrick Whelan	Caledonia Gladiators
C	Gabriel Olaseni	London Lions

Source: 2023–24 BBL Team of the Year

=== 2023–24 BBL All-British Team of the Year ===
#	Player	Team
PG	Kimbal Mackenzie	Leicester Riders
SG	Tarik Phillip	London Lions
SF	Aaryn Rai	Cheshire Phoenix
PF	Patrick Whelan	Caledonia Gladiators
C	Gabriel Olaseni	London Lions

Source: 2023–24 BBL All-British Team of the Year

=== 2023–24 BBL Defensive Team of the Year ===
#	Player	Team
PG	Laquincy Rideau	Cheshire Phoenix
SG	Tarik Phillip	London Lions
SF	Jamell Anderson	Manchester Giants
PF	Clifton Moore	Caledonia Gladiators
C	Josh Sharma	London Lions

Source: 2023–24 BBL Defensive Team of the Year

== British clubs in European competitions ==
Team	Competition	Progress
London Lions	EuroCup	Semifinals
Caledonia Gladiators	Champions League	Pre-qualifying round
Caledonia Gladiators	FIBA Europe Cup	Regular season
Bristol Flyers	ENBL	Quarterfinals
Newcastle Eagles	ENBL	Quarterfinals

Preceded by 2022–23 season	BBL seasons 2023–24	Succeeded by 2024–25 season
