= Trezvant =

Trezvant is a surname. Notable people with the surname include:

- James Trezvant (died 1841), American politician
- John Trezvant (born 1964), American basketball player
