= Seminole State College =

Seminole State College may refer to:

- Seminole State College of Florida
- Seminole State College (Oklahoma)
