= Laquincy Rideau =

American basketball player (born 1996)

No. 0 – Ylli
- Position: Point guard
- League: Kosovo Basketball Superleague

Personal information
- Born: March 28, 1996 (age 30) West Palm Beach, Florida, U.S.
- Listed height: 6 ft 1 in (1.85 m)
- Listed weight: 205 lb (93 kg)

Career information
- High school: Palm Beach Lakes (West Palm Beach, Florida); Blanche Ely (Pompano Beach, Florida)
- College: Gardner–Webb (2015–2017); South Florida (2018–2020)
- NBA draft: 2020: undrafted
- Playing career: 2020–present

Career history
- 2020–2021: Résidence Walferdange
- 2021–2022: Šentjur
- 2022: Punto Rojo LR
- 2023–2024: Cheshire Phoenix
- 2024: Rilski Sportist
- 2025: Ostrava
- 2025–2026: Cheshire Phoenix
- 2026–present: Ylli

Career highlights
- BBL Trophy winner (2024); BBL Trophy MVP (2024); CBI champion (2019); AAC Defensive Player of the Year (2019); Second-team All-Big South (2017)

Laquincy Rideau (born March 28, 1996) is an American professional basketball player for Ylli of the Kosovo Basketball Superleague. He played college basketball for the Gardner–Webb Runnin' Bulldogs and South Florida Bulls. Rideau won the BBL Trophy with Cheshire Phoenix in 2024, and was named the tournament MVP.

== Early life ==
Rideau began his high school career at Palm Beach Lakes Community High School. Prior to his senior season, he transferred to Blanche Ely High School. Rideau had three triple-doubles on an undefeated Class 7A championship team. He averaged 16.2 points, 6.8 assists, 5.3 rebounds and 4.9 steals per game, garnering Class 7A all-state first team honors. Rideau was lightly recruited, committed to playing college basketball for Gardner–Webb over Saint Peter's.

== College career ==
Rideau averaged 5.8 points, 2.5 assists, and 2 steals per game as a freshman. As a sophomore, Rideau averaged 14.2 points, 5.7 rebounds, 5.2 assists, and 3 steals per game. He was named to the Second Team All-Big South. Following his sophomore season, Rideau transferred to South Florida, choosing the Bulls over Rutgers, Iona, Providence, and Florida Gulf Coast. He sat out the 2017–18 season as a redshirt per NCAA rules, but injured his foot shortly after signing with South Florida, which kept him from practicing until January 2018. On January 12, 2019, Rideau posted a triple double of 18 points, 10 assists, and 10 steals in an 82–80 overtime loss to Temple. On April 2, he scored a career-high 35 points along with eight assists and four steals in the second game of the College Basketball Invitational against DePaul. Rideau averaged 13.4 points, 5.4 assists and 2.9 steals per game as a junior, earning AAC Defensive Player of the Year honors. Following the season, he declared for the 2019 NBA draft, but ultimately withdrew to return to South Florida. As a senior, Rideau averaged 12.6 points, 4.4 rebounds and 2.5 steals per game.

== Professional career ==
After going undrafted in the 2020 NBA draft, Rideau joined Résidence Walferdange of the Luxembourg Basketball League. He averaged 20.1 points, 7.3 rebounds, 5 assists, and 3.1 steals per game. On December 2, 2021, Rideau signed with KK Šentjur of the Premier A Slovenian Basketball League.

Rideau joined the Cheshire Phoenix of the British Basketball League (BBL) on July 11, 2023. On January 28, 2024, Rideau and Cheshire won the BBL Trophy after an 98–82 upset win over London Lions in the final. Following his 25 points in the game, Rideau was named the tournament's MVP.

On July 28, 2026, Rideau signed with Ylli of the Kosovo Basketball Superleague.

== Career statistics ==
Legend
GP	Games played	GS	Games started	MPG	Minutes per game
FG%	Field goal percentage	3P%	3-point field goal percentage	FT%	Free throw percentage
RPG	Rebounds per game	APG	Assists per game	SPG	Steals per game
BPG	Blocks per game	PPG	Points per game	**Bold**	Career high

=== College ===
Year	Team	GP	GS	MPG	FG%	3P%	FT%	RPG	APG	SPG	BPG	PPG
2015–16	Gardner–Webb	33	1	15.8	.437	.300	.457	2.2	2.5	2.0	.1	5.8
2016–17	Gardner–Webb	33	30	28.8	**.470**	**.390**	**.579**	**5.7**	5.2	**3.0**	**.3**	**14.2**
2017–18	South Florida	Redshirt										
2018–19	South Florida	**35**	**34**	32.1	.409	.338	.549	3.7	**5.4**	2.9	.1	13.4
2019–20	South Florida	31	31	**32.5**	.374	.295	.562	4.4	4.2	2.5	.2	12.6
Career		132	96	27.3	.418	.328	.549	4.0	4.3	2.6	.2	11.5

== Personal life ==
Rideau has four siblings. His father, Greg Rideau, pitched in the Cleveland Indians organization and is a police officer. His mother is a middle school culinary-arts teacher.

== See also ==
- List of NCAA Division I men's basketball career steals leaders
