= Joe Ikhinmwin =

British basketball player (born 1987)

Joseph Ikhinmwin
Personal information
- Born: 18 September 1987 (age 39) London, England
- Listed height: 198 cm (6 ft 6 in)
- Listed weight: 100 kg (220 lb)

Career information
- High school: Barking Abbey Basketball Academy
- College: Seminole State College (2008-2010); South Carolina State (2010-2012)
- NBA draft: 2012: undrafted
- Playing career: 2012–2021
- Position: Forward
- Number: 7

Career history
- 2012–2013: Newcastle Eagles
- 2013–2021: London Lions

Career highlights
- BBL Play-Offs Finalist (2012/13); BBL Trophy Finalist (2012/13); BBL Cup Finalist (2012/13); BBL All-Star Slam Dunk Trophy Champion (2014); London Lions Team Captain (2015-2021); BBL Play-Offs Finalist (2014/15); Sports Ball Guest of Honour (2016); Betway Basketball All-Stars Winner (2016/17); BBL Play-Offs Finalist (2017/18); BBL Championship Winner(2018/19); BBL Cup Winner (2018/19); Commonwealth Games Team England (2018); Betway Basketball All-Stars Winner (2019/20); BBL Play-Offs Finalist (2020/21); BBL Cup Finalist (2020/21); BBL Trophy Winner (2020/21); London Lions Team Captain 2015-2021 (retirement)

Joseph "Jei" Blessing Ikhinmwin (born 18 September 1987) is a former professional basketball player, 3x British Basketball Champion, England and Great Britain International who last played for the London Lions of the British Basketball League (BBL). He served as the team captain in 2015 of the Lions until his retirement in 2021 after playing in the BBL for 9 years.

He has co-hosted the popular YouTube Channel "The Cyber Nerds" since 2015.

== Biography ==
=== Early life ===
Born in East London in Newham, Ikhinmwin began playing basketball at the age of 14. Though he initially showed interest in playing football, it was with the suggestion of his P.E. teacher and the support of his father that he turned his focus to basketball. He started his career at East London Royals Junior program based in Whitechapel under the supervision of the late Humphrey Long and Chris Morgan.

=== High school career ===
In 2006, Ikhinmwin transferred to Barking Abbey Basketball Academy. He was selected to represent Great Britain at FIBA U18 and was then chosen as the U20 team captain playing in 2007. Additionally, in 2006–2007, he played for the NBL Division I London Leopards.

=== College career ===
After graduating from Barking Abbey School sixth form, Ikhinmwin left Britain to study at Seminole State College in Oklahoma, where he played from 2007 to 2010 for the Trojans (NJCAA). He sat out his first year due to a back injury but showed good performance in the last two seasons. The Trojans won the Bi-State Conference championship in 2008 with a 21–9 record. Eventually, Ikhinmwin began getting scouted by NCAA universities with his growing success.

In 2009, Ikhinmwin committed to transferring to HBCU South Carolina State University. In 2010, he joined the NCAA Division I South Carolina State Bulldogs in the MEAC for the 2010–2012 seasons. Ikhinmwin wore the jersey number "0" and started 15 of 27 games in 2011 and 2012 where he averaged 6 points and 4 rebounds per game. He set his career high at SCSU with 21 points, 5 rebounds, 2 assists, and 1 steal on 8 for 11 shooting in February 2012 against the North Carolina Central Eagles.

== Professional basketball career ==
=== 2012/13 season ===
Ikhinmwin returned to the UK for his rookie season in 2012/2013 as a member of Newcastle Eagles. During his time there he finished with runner-up medals in the BBL regular season, Playoffs, and Cup before returning to London and signing to his hometown.

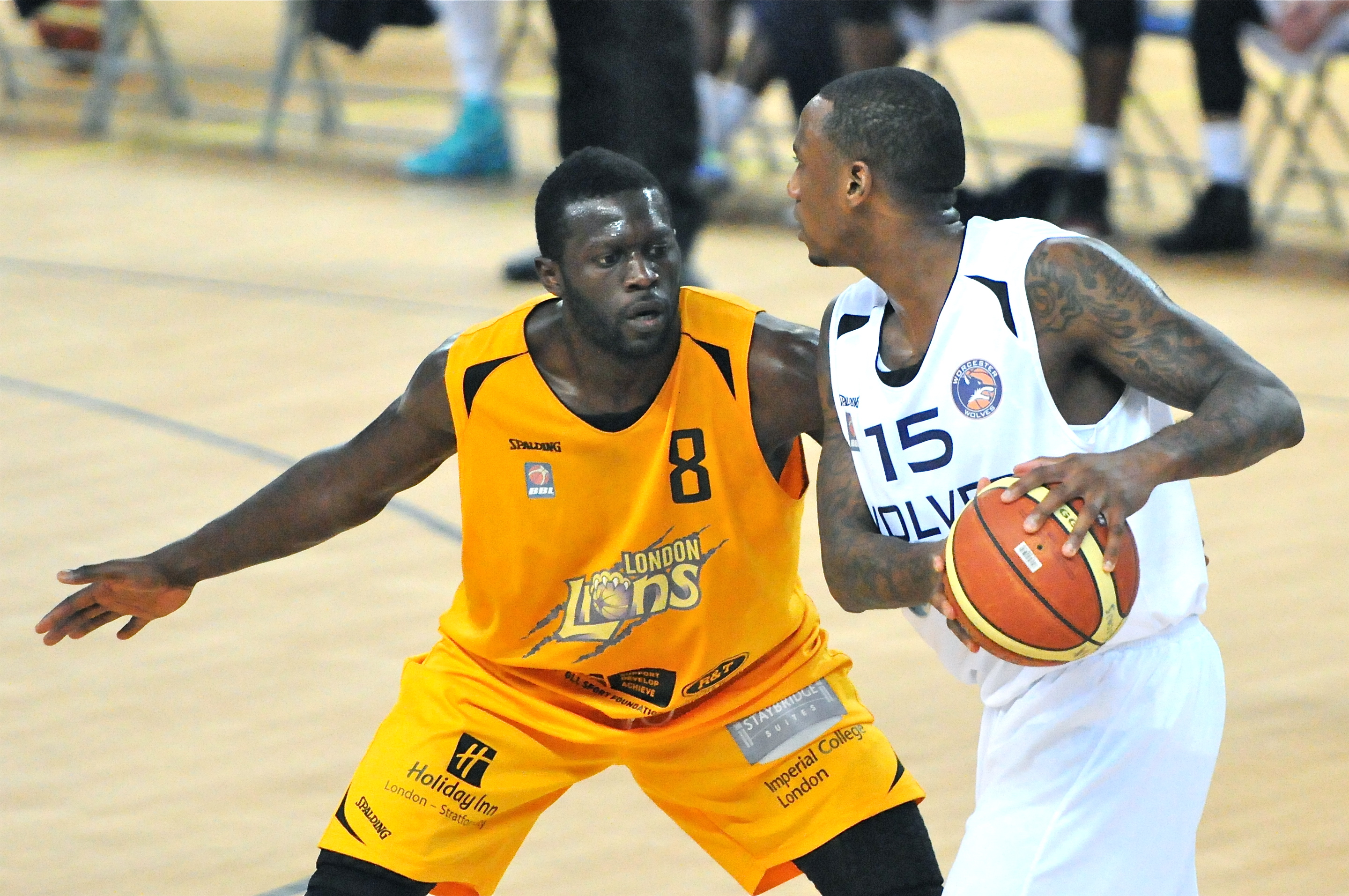
London Lions' Joe Ikhinmwin and Worcester Wolves' Alex Owumi in 2014

He started his London Lions career in September 2013. During Ikhinmwin's debut on the London Lions against the Manchester Giants on 27 September 2013, he scored a career-high 22 points and 14 rebounds. He had 2 assists, 1 steal, shot 9/17 from two, 1/4 from three, shooting at 47.6% from the field. He also shot 1/1 from the free-throw line. Over his first year with the Lions, Ikhinmwin played multiple positions averaging just over 8 points and 4 rebounds per game while shooting 46% from the floor.

Ikhinmwin quickly became a fan favourite, and gained international recognition early in his career with the team's notable improvement, and his career was soon attributed to basketball's growing popularity in the UK.

=== 2013/14 season ===
On 31 March 2014, Ikhinmwin won the 2014 BBL Trophy Slam Dunk contest in Glasgow's Emirates Arena at the BBL Trophy Finals. On the same day, he represented England at the International Friendly against Scotland and scored 15 points. The Lions went on to the BBL Championship Playoff Quarter Finals of the 2013–14 British Basketball League season. Ikhinmwin was the British BBL Week 1 Team of the Week Honorable Mention Recipient for the 2013/14 season.

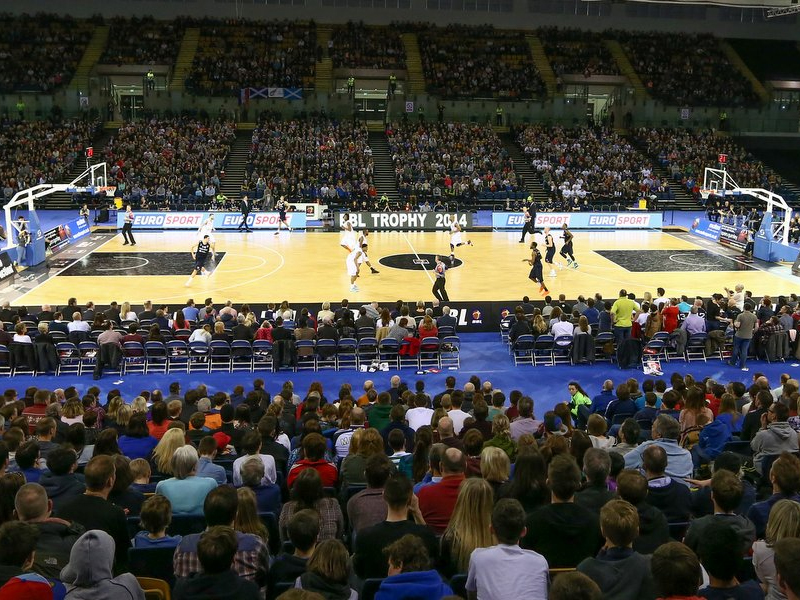
BBL Trophy Finals at the Emirates Arena in 2014

During the off-season in the summer of 2014, Ikhinmwin accepted a 2-year contract extension with the London Lions. In September 2014, the Lions exercised an early termination clause in the contract and returned with a week-to-week contract revision, which Ikhinmwin rejected. In his statement to fans, Ikhinmwin expressed, "This has been an incredibly hard decision to make, but my family and I felt it was the only choice I had with the recent turn of events, which would benefit the Lions and the best interests of my career".

=== 2014/15 season ===
Ikhinmwin re-negotiated his contract and returned to the Lions in December 2014. His return marked the 2014/2015 season as a notable comeback for the Lions. They finished 6th in the regular season with Ikhinwin averaging 8 points per game. and starting 20 out of 30 games. His season high was in April 2015, scoring 21 points and 8 field goals against Surrey Scorchers. In the playoffs, the Lions defeated Worcester Wolves in the quarter-finals and Cheshire Phoenix in the semi-finals. Ikhinmwin set a career-high in free throws during this game, making 7 of 7 attempts. By the end of the season, Ikhinmwin had made over 90 game appearances since joining the Lions.

In May 2015, the team played in the BBL Playoff Finals against Newcastle Eagles in front of over 14,700 at The O2 Arena. Ikhinmwin scored 35 points during the Playoffs.

=== 2015/16 season ===
In July 2015 Ikhinmwin became the London Lions' team captain. Ikhinmwin's season-high was 20 points scored against the Bristol Flyers in October 2015. Also during that game, he had 2 steals and 9 field goals. In the 2015/16 season, he averaged 7 points a game, 57% shooting from the floor, whilst corralling just under 4 rebounds per outing. In November 2015, Ikhinmwin hit a last second three-pointer that put the game against the Worcester Wolves into overtime. His contribution helped the Lions win the game and earn a place in the semi-finals of the Cup. On

In March 2016, the London Lions participated in the "16 Days of Activism" against gender-based discrimination campaign. Ikhinmwin stood by his teammates in partnership with MK Act for White Ribbon Day, sharing his dedication to ending violence against women and the importance women have played in his life. He is quoted as saying, "The team and I feel men and boys have a crucial role to play in creating a culture where male violence, abuse, and harassment against women and girls are simply seen as unacceptable". On the 16th Day of Activism, the London Lions played BBL Cup Semi-Finals at the Copper Box Arena in the Olympic Park.

After the season ended, Ikhinmwin was the Guest of Honour and presenter at the Middlesex University annual "Sports Ball" in May 2016.

=== 2016/17 season ===
The 2016/17 season kicked off with a 5-game winning streak for the Lions. In October 2016, Ikhinmwin led the Lions to victory over his former team the Newcastle Eagles for the club's first time in 13 years. This win advanced the Lions to a 3–0 record in the BBL. The Lions started 2017 with a win against Surrey Scorchers (92–103). At the end of a high-scoring third period, Ikhinmwin beat the buzzer with the corner three to edge the Lions further clear, up 16. On 25 February 2017, Ikhinmwin set his career high in efficiency in a British Basketball game. That day he accomplished 26 efficiency in the game against Bristol, also scoring 15 points, 9 rebounds, and 3 assists. On 9 April 2017, he scored his season-high against Leeds Force with 15 points, 4 offensive rebounds, and 7 field goals made.

After the Lion's started the season with an undefeated first month, the Lions finished in sixth with an 18–15 record before moving on to the Semi-Finals of the BBL Playoffs and BBL Cup. During the regular season, Ikhinmwin averaged 7 points a game on 57% shooting from the floor, and 4 rebounds per outing, scoring 221 points throughout the regular season making it his second highest scoring year since joining the Lions.

In summer 2017, Ikhinmwin was named out of hundreds of basketball players in England to begin training with Team England's squad ahead of the Commonwealth Games the following year.

=== 2017/18 season ===
In August 2017, Ikhinmwin renewed his contract with the Lions for the next two seasons. In September 2017, Ikhinmwin captained the Lions to their first national championship at Betway British Basketball All-Stars at The O2 Arena. This was the team's first piece of Silverware since making the move from Milton Keynes to London in 2012. In addition to the trophy, the team won the record-breaking £100,000 prize fund. On 1 January 2018, Ikhinwin set his career high in assists in a BBL game, with five assists during the London Lions' 86–81 win against Chester. During the game, he also had seven points and two rebounds.

During the Quarter-Finals in May 2018, Ikhinmwin scored a three-pointer which forced the game into overtime against Worcester Wolves and helped the Lions secure their spot in the Semi-Finals. The 2017/18 season marked the Lion's highest-ever league finish, placing them in the last four for the third time in four years for the BBL Finals in May 2018.

=== The Commonwealth Games ===
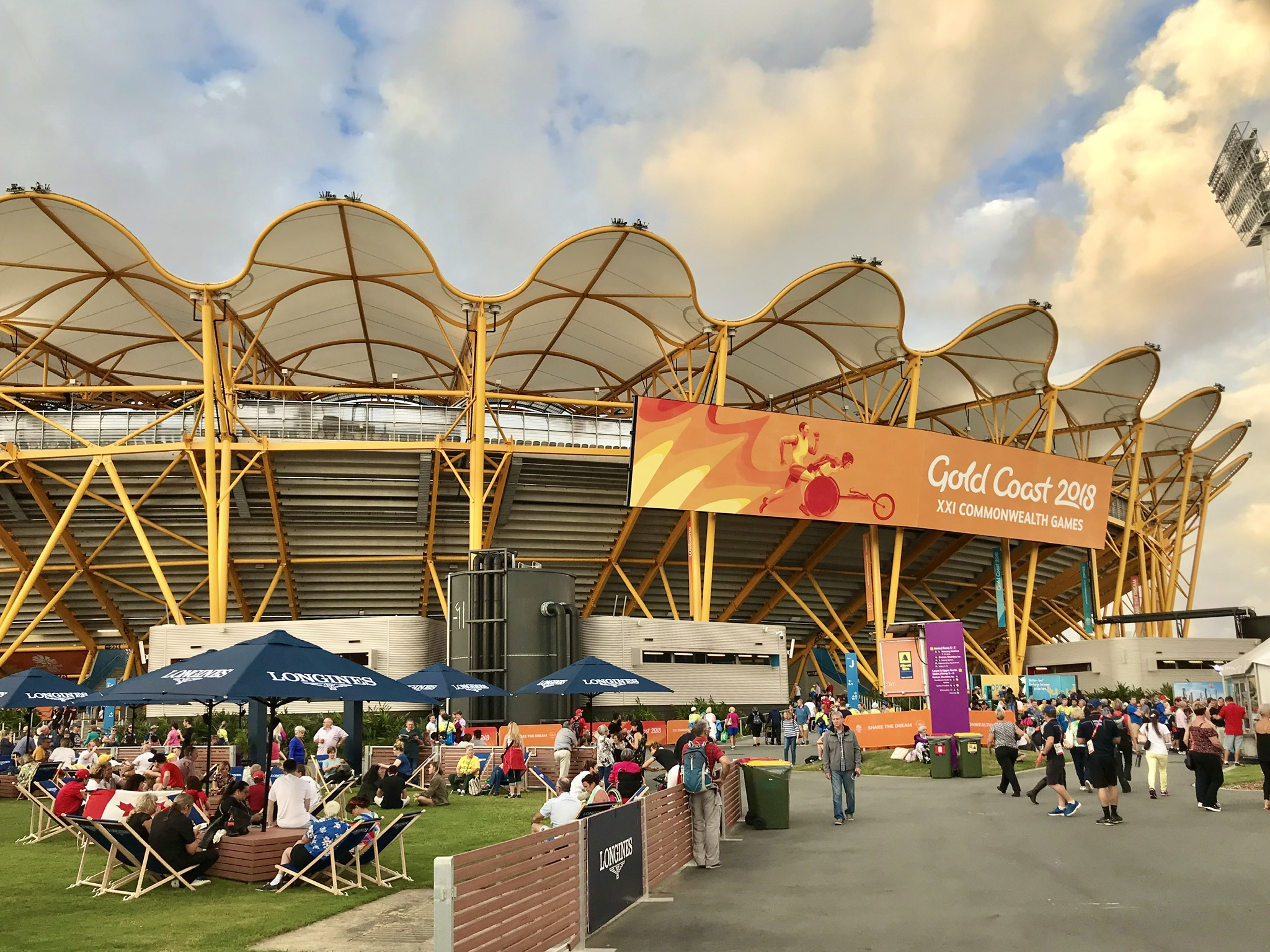
Ikhinmwin represented Team England in Men's Basketball at the 2018 Commonwealth Games.

The Commonwealth Games - Gold Coast took place 4–15 April 2018 with over 6,600 athletes and team officials from 70 nations. Athletes competed in 18 sports over 11 days. Team England placed second on the medal table with a total of 136 medals, including 45 golds.

After making it through numerous training rounds and rigorous preparation over 10 months, Ikhinmwin was selected out of 64 other players from the UK, 24 from the BBL to represent Team England in Men's Basketball during the 2018 Commonwealth Games on the Gold Coast. His name was announced on the official Team England roster in March 2018. In light of being chosen as one of the twelve elite players from the UK, Ikhinmwin stated: "The only greater honour of being captain of your home-town team is getting to represent your country, so I feel like I’m winning on all fronts right now, and I really appreciate the honour".

Team England held a 10-day preparation camp in Brisbane. The preliminary games for the England Men's Basketball team were held in Townsville, Australia against Cameroon, India, and Scotland. England played against Canada in the Qualifying Finals for Basketball at the 2018 Commonwealth Games – Men's tournament in Cairns.

=== 2018/19 season ===
The London Lions set a BBL record 11-game winning streak from 14 December 2018 – 22 March 2019. In December 2018, the Lions became the first team to book their spot in the BBL Cup Final after overcoming Eagles of Newcastle 170–160. In January 2019, Ikihnmwin led the Lions to their first BBL Silverware since 2008 and their first major title since moving to London with a 68–54 win over Glasgow Rocks, earning the Lions the 2019 BBL Cup title.

In April 2019, the Lions won the BBL Championship title for the first time ever after defeating Ikhinmwin's previous team Newcastle 99–80.

=== 2019/20 season ===
Ahead of the 2019/20 season in October 2019, the Lions won the Betway British Basketball All-Stars for the second time in a victory over Newcastle Eagles. This was the precipice for more success to come as 2019/20 was a victorious season for Captain Ikhinmwin and his team prior to the COVID-19 pandemic. The Lions kicked off their season with a win against Caledonia Gladiators (88–72) and went on to win 8 out of their 12 matches before their season was cut short. On 17 March 2020, the season was postponed due to the COVID-19 pandemic in the United Kingdom. On 1 June 2020, the season was canceled, with no League or Playoffs champions declared.

Ikhinmwin renewed his contract with the London Lions ahead of the 2020-21 campaign on 14 July 2020, marking his eighth season with the team.

=== 2020/21 season ===
The London Lions returned to play the 2020/21 season in September 2020 with modifications made to Copper Box Arena's safety protocol due to the COVID-19 virus. Though restrictions were placed on arena capacity and player safety to follow pandemic policies, it was a markedly strong season for the London Lions' performance. London Lion fans proved loyal and the popularity of basketball in the UK did not suffer during the pandemic. In 2020, Sky Sports returned the BBL to their network, signing a 2-year agreement to air 30 games to the growing basketball fanbase across the UK.

In November 2020, the Lions' entry into the Basketball Champions League Qualifying Rounds for the 2020–21 season marked the first time a London team would be represented in a European competition since the turn of the century. Ikhinmwin scored 7 points in the game versus Neptūnas. The London Lions were selected for the FIBA Europe Cup taking place 26–29 January 2021 in Poland for the first time in club history. Due to COVID-19 disruptions, the London Lions were withdrawn from participating.

The British Basketball League and Basketball England partnered with TikTok at the beginning of 2021 for Britain's first ever major basketball social. media campaign. The content featured Ikhinmwin and other Lions teammates. The Basketball England account gained over 100k followers and the hashtag #BritishBasketball garnered 21.4m posts in the first three days of the campaign, rising from 4.5m prior to the launch. The campaign proved successful in its aim to increase a younger fanbase for BBL.

In March 2021, the Lions made their way to the Semi-Finals of the BBL Trophy tournament with the help of a significant performance from Ikhinmwin during the game against Surrey Scorchers (109–90), scoring ten points from off the bench. The London Lions advanced to the finals and won the BBL Trophy for the first time in their history, earning the team their third piece of silverware since January 2019. After a 14-game winning streak, the team advanced to the finals of the BBL Championship that year and played against Newcastle Eagles.

=== Retirement ===
On 19 August 2021, Ikhinmwin announced his retirement from professional basketball. The fan favourite and dynamic Forward's departure left behind a legacy for the club, serving as team captain for six of the eight years on the Lions, leading his team to take multiple titles including the BBL Cup, BBL Trophy, BBL Playoffs, BBL Championship, and Betway All-Star Game winners, multiple years in a row. He also earned accolades including representing England's Senior Men's team at the Commonwealth Games in 2018, winner of the inaugural All-Star Basketball Championship, and British Basketball League Slam Dunk champion during his tenure as team captain. Over Ikhinmwin's career, he made 14 European international appearances and faced 992 opponents over 125 games.

== Off the court ==
=== Film, television, and streaming ===
In 2015, Ikhinmwin launched a web show with two best friends called "The Cyber Nerds" that has amassed major success across social media platforms, including gaining over 200k subscribers and 70 million views on YouTube. The series explores and reviews current and upcoming films, television, video games, and "all things nerdy." Notable interviews include directors Jon Favreau, Matt Reeves, and Zack Snyder. In 2019, "The Cyber Nerds" channel expanded into podcasting with "TCN" podcast. In 2024, the team started the "Beyond the Sofa" podcast.

In addition to "The Cyber Nerds" channel, Ikhinmwin is an active livestreamer, YouTube personality and influencer. He has a large following on Twitch and Discord, while also being a featured keynote speaker and podcast guest on channels including No Shortcuts to Success by Trade Nation, the Alternative Sport Show by Verge Magazine, and the Hoopsfix podcast. Throughout his career on and off the court, Ikhinmwin has been featured in commercials including, Sony, Betway and Channel 4, as well as voiceover projects.

In 2021, Ikhinmwin and Jack Howard, Chief critic at the Independent Clarisse Loughrey, launched Amazon Prime UK's "The Screen Test" online series and podcast. The weekly show featured special guests to discuss the top releases in genres such as sitcoms, Academy award-winning films and sci-fi.

In 2022, Ikhinmwin acquired The Films Critic channel on YouTube and Patreon. Ikhinmwin is a partner in the channel's content, which focuses on highlighting cinematic pieces that "go beyond the well-known IP" to educate subscribers on various genres of film by featuring commentary, interviews, and film facts.

In 2023, Ikhinmwin became a presenter on Sky Cinema's original series "Take Your Seat" where he joined Gary Noma for cinematic commentary. The short-form series discusses feature films and Sky Cinema originals.

Ikhinmwin made his directorial debut in 2023 with a short film series titled "Dark Stranger: Part One" with the first installment premiering 18 September 2023 and "Dark Stranger: Part Two" on 14 February 2024.

=== Guest appearances ===
The former London Lions captain has returned to the court for celebrity guest appearances and charity games. In 2021, musician AJ Tracey enlisted the help of Ikhinmwin to produce the "Flu Game All Stars Basketball Tournament" in support of his second album, Flu Game. Included in the event were fellow UK celebrities and musicians including Michael Dapaah, Stefflon Don, Wes Nelson, Bandokay, Double Lz, SL, Young T and Bugsey, Konan, Big Zuu, and others.

In 2022, Ikhinmwin returned to London's Copper Box Arena court to play in the annual Celebrity Ball Out basketball game produced by the charity Who's Got Game. Ikhhinmwin played in the charity game alongside rapper D Double E, musician Big Tobz, boxer Anthony Yarde, Love Island star Michael Griffiths, former X-Factor winners Rak-Su, YouTube stars Harry Pinero and Elz, Famalam actor Samson Kayo, and more.

=== Entrepreneurial ===
While still playing for the London Lions and training for the 2018 Commonwealth Games, Ikhinmwin began studying for his postgraduate degree at University of East London in 2016. He earned his Master's in Sports Management in 2018. He is an active alum of the university and passionate about growing awareness about the importance of education to young sports players. He was featured in the school's "Leave your Legacy" campaign and expressed his passion for inclusion and diversity in sports.

Ikhinmwin founded Red Yellow Blue Entertainment Limited in 2018 which manages motion picture, video, and television programme post-production activities. He also launched his own production company called Zero Budget Productions in 2023.

== Philanthropy ==
Both in personal and professional life, Ikhinmwin supports a number of charity projects, including serving as a GLL-supported athlete and the ambassador of the GLL Sport Foundation, Sports for Schools, and London Sports Trust.

Ikhinmwin founded his own youth non-profit, the ICanWin Foundation in 2013 where he works in partnership with a number of schools, sports clubs, and community groups to deliver engaging and skills-based lessons through a range of sports activities to children and young adults across London.

In 2018, Ikhinmwin was instrumental in the partnership between University of East London and his team the London Lions to create a pathway between academia and athletics for both scholars and non-scholars. Ikhinmwin and teammates were able to utilize Queen Elizabeth Olympic Park to offer free basketball coaching to children on outdoor courts throughout the summer holidays, eventually enabling them to begin a "Junior Lions" club out of the Copper Box arena once a week.

In 2021, GLL supported more than 200 basketball players and in 2022 is investing over £1 million into the development of local athletes with Ikhinmwin's support as ambassador. Ikhinmwin continues traveling to schools across the UK to inspire primary school children to chase their dreams through ICanWin Sports and the Sports for Schools Foundation. His mission is to build confidence in young students while also helping raise funds for the foundation and various local charities.

Alongside his YouTube channel co-hosts, "The Cyber Nerds" partner with local charities including the 5 On It Foundation to offer content creation courses to youth in the community.
