= Matt Morgan (basketball) =

American basketball player (born 1997)

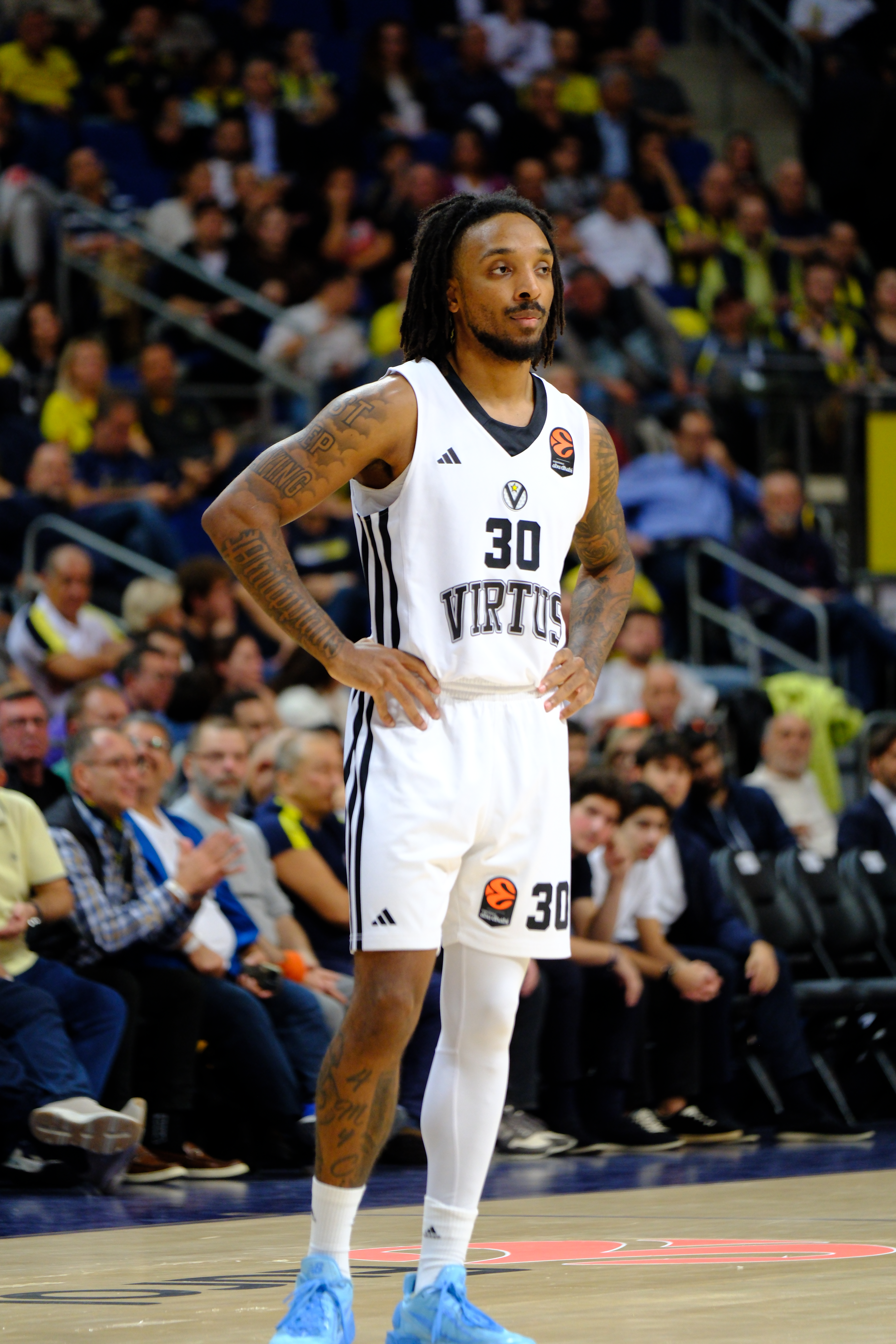
- Morgan with Virtus Bologna in 2025

No. 30 – Aris Thessaloniki
- Position: Shooting guard / point guard
- League: GBL; EuroCup

Personal information
- Born: November 7, 1997 (age 28) Concord, North Carolina, U.S.
- Listed height: 6 ft 4 in (1.93 m)
- Listed weight: 185 lb (84 kg)

Career information
- High school: Cox Mill (Concord, North Carolina)
- College: Cornell (2015–2019)
- NBA draft: 2019: undrafted
- Playing career: 2019–present

Career history
- 2019–2021: Raptors 905
- 2021–2022: Konyaspor
- 2022–2023: Le Mans
- 2023–2024: London Lions
- 2024–2026: Virtus Bologna
- 2026–present: Aris Thessaloniki

Career highlights
- All-EuroCup First Team (2024); Lega Serie A champion (2025); British League champion (2024); British League MVP (2024); All-LNB Pro A Team (2023); 2× First-team All-Ivy League (2018, 2019); 2× Second-team All-Ivy League (2016, 2017)
- Stats at Basketball Reference

Matthew Garnell Morgan (born November 7, 1997) is an American professional basketball player for Aris Thessaloniki of the Greek Basketball League (GBL) and the EuroCup. He played college basketball for Cornell.

== High school career ==
Morgan attended Cox Mill High School, joining the varsity team as a sophomore. He scored 760 points during his junior season. His jersey was retired on senior night as he helped his team claim a share of the South Piedmont championship. Morgan graduated as the school's all-time leading scorer though his records were since broken by Wendell Moore Jr. He received scant collegiate recruiting attention, eventually signing with Cornell.

== College career ==
As a freshman, Morgan compiled six Ivy League rookie of the week honors and was named league player of the week after scoring a school freshman-record 33 points in a win against Harvard. He earned Second Team All-Ivy League honors, averaging 18.9 points, 3.1 rebounds, 2.0 assists and 1.4 steals per game. As a sophomore, Morgan led the Ivy League in scoring, averaging 18.1 points to go with 4.6 rebounds, 2.1 assists and 0.8 steals per game. He was named to the Second Team All-Ivy League. Morgan averaged 22.5 points, 4.6 rebounds and 3.2 assists per game as a junior, earning First Team All-Ivy League honors. Following the season, he declared for the 2018 NBA draft but ultimately returned to school. On January 9, 2019, Morgan scored a career-high 38 points including a school-record nine 3-pointers in an 86–74 win over Towson. He also became the second Cornell player to surpass 2,000 points after Ryan Wittman and set a school record for career free throws with 438 in the victory. As a senior, Morgan averaged 22.2 points, 4.5 rebounds and 3.0 assists per game while shooting 51 percent from the floor and 43 percent from 3-point range. He was named to the First Team All-Ivy League and was selected to play in the Reese's College All-Star Game. Morgan finished his career at Cornell with 2,333 points, becoming the Ivy League's second all-time leading scorer behind Bill Bradley.

== Professional career ==
After going undrafted in the 2019 NBA draft, Morgan signed with the Toronto Raptors for summer league play. He averaged 4.3 points, two rebounds and one assist per game in the summer league. He signed with the Raptors on October 17, 2019, only to be waived on October 20. Morgan joined the Raptors 905 of the NBA G League and missed the team's second game with an unspecified illness or injury. In the third game of the season, he scored 17 points on 4-of-9 shooting from 3-point range in a loss to the Maine Red Claws, while also contributing five rebounds and five assists. On January 12, 2020, Morgan scored a career-high 21 points in a 123–119 loss to the College Park Skyhawks. Morgan averaged 8.3 points, 2.1 rebounds and 1.9 assists per game in his rookie season for Raptors 905. The following season, he averaged 8.7 points, 1.0 rebound and 2.5 assists per game.

On August 20, 2021, Morgan signed with Konyaspor of the Turkish Basketball First League.

On June 21, 2022, he signed with Le Mans of the French Pro A.

On July 20, 2023, Morgan signed with London Lions of the British Basketball League (BBL).

In the following season, Morgan signed with Virtus Bologna of the Italian Lega Basket Serie A (LBA) and the EuroLeague and Virtus ended the EuroLeague at the 17th place, following a disappointing regular season. After arriving first in the national championship season, Virtus eliminated Venezia 3–2 and their arch-rival Milan 3–1, reaching their fifth finals in a row. They then defeated Brescia 3–0, claiming the Italian championship title for the 17th time.

On July 8, 2026, Morgan signed a two-year contract with Aris Thessaloniki of the Greek Basketball League (GBL) and the EuroCup.

== Career statistics ==
Legend
GP	Games played	GS	Games started	MPG	Minutes per game
FG%	Field goal percentage	3P%	3-point field goal percentage	FT%	Free throw percentage
RPG	Rebounds per game	APG	Assists per game	SPG	Steals per game
BPG	Blocks per game	PPG	Points per game	**Bold**	Career high

=== College ===
Year	Team	GP	GS	MPG	FG%	3P%	FT%	RPG	APG	SPG	BPG	PPG
2015–16	Cornell	27	26	30.7	.414	.327	.808	3.1	2.0	**1.4**	**.4**	18.9
2016–17	Cornell	28	27	32.4	.456	.376	.857	**4.6**	2.1	.8	.2	18.1
2017–18	Cornell	28	28	**34.6**	.492	.369	.817	**4.6**	**3.2**	.8	.3	**22.5**
2018–19	Cornell	**31**	**31**	32.3	**.513**	**.431**	**.860**	4.5	3.0	**1.4**	.3	22.2
Career		114	112	32.5	.470	.377	.834	4.2	2.6	1.1	.3	20.5

== Personal life ==
Morgan's father Lamont Morgan played basketball at Georgetown in the 1980s. He has 3 brothers. The middle brother, Malcolm, is currently playing at Emory & Henry University. The two youngest, Myles and Marcus Morgan are twins and are former Roanoke College basketball players.
