= Brad Greene =

American basketball player (born 1998)

Free Agent
- Position: Center

Personal information
- Born: May 20, 1998 (age 28) Lone Pine, California, U.S.
- Listed height: 6 ft 11 in (2.11 m)
- Listed weight: 270 lb (122 kg)

Career information
- High school: Lone Pine High School (Lone Pine, California)
- College: UC Irvine (2016–2021)
- NBA draft: 2021: undrafted
- Playing career: 2021–present

Career history
- 2021–2022: Gartenzaun24 Baskets Paderborn
- 2022–2023: Kapfenberg Bulls
- 2023–2024: Bristol Flyers
- 2024–2025: ZZ Leiden

Career highlights
- Dutch Supercup winner (2024)

Brad Greene (born May 20, 1998) is an American basketball player who last played for ZZ Leiden of the BNXT League. He played college basketball for the UC Irvine.

== College career ==
In his first collegiate game, Greene recorded a statline of 6 points and 4 rebounds in a 56–72 loss over Utah State.

== Professional career ==
In 2023, Greene signed a one-year deal with the Bristol Flyers. Greene noted that his signing with the team was a much needed-break for a step-up for his career.

On August 14, 2024, Greene signed with ZZ Leiden of the Dutch Basketball League, wherein his signing with the team was said to be an impactful one as it would bolster their frontcourt presence. On September 11, Greene grabbed 10 rebounds that propelled Leiden to win the 2024 Dutch Supercup title.
