= Seminole State College (Oklahoma) =

Public college in Seminole, Oklahoma, US

- Type: Public community college
- Established: 1931
- President: Lana Reynolds
- Students: 1,471 (fall 2023)
- Location: Seminole, Oklahoma, U.S. 35°14′54″N 96°42′16″W
- Nickname: Trojans
- Sporting affiliations: Bi-State Conference (NJCAA)
- Website: www.sscok.edu

Seminole State College is a public community college in Seminole, Oklahoma.

== History ==
The college was founded as Seminole Junior College in 1931 and was renamed Seminole State College in 1996.

== Campus ==
The campus is in Seminole, Oklahoma at the junction of Highway 9 W and U.S. Route 270.

== Academics ==
The college provides one and two-year programs of collegiate-level technical-occupational education.

== Athletics ==
The college athletics teams are nicknamed the Trojans. Female basketballers are the Belles.

== Notable alumni ==
- Nick Blackburn, professional baseball player
- Anthony Bowie, professional basketball player
- Simone Edwards, professional basketball player
- Ryan Franklin, professional baseball player
- Éric Gagné, professional baseball player
- Evan Gattis, professional baseball player
- Joe Ikhinmwin, professional basketball player and media personality
- Abraham Toro, professional baseball player
