= John Trezvant =

American basketball player

John Wesley Trezvant (born 2 November 1964) is a former professional basketball player.

== Basketball career ==
John Trezvant is currently a basketball coach for the Wilmslow Wizards, working in Greater Manchester, England.

During his professional basketball career, he played for a number of top teams at the highest level of basketball in the UK but not in the NBA. As well as being on a number of championship and cup/trophy winning teams, John proved to be a versatile player on and off the court. Throughout his career John was famous for his quickness to score regularly on the court as well as being able to bring the ball up the floor and lead the break using his above average ball handling.

There were oftentimes during his career when he would start a game at centre and finish it playing point guard.

== Biography ==
Trezvant first gained national attention at the John O'Connell High School of Technology. He was the first to lead O'Connell high to the play-offs in 10 years. After graduating from high school, Trezvant went to the San Francisco City College, where he studied General Studies, where he first met Brad Duggan. Trezvant has won two Golden Gate Conference titles during his career. The second year he went on to win the Golden Gate Conference Player Of The Year, he also won California Player of the Year in 1984. After a successful junior college career Trezvant went on to Texas A&M University under the late Shelby Metcalf.

Stats(P.G)

Points- 23

Rebounds- 12

Steals- 4

Free throws%- 74

People shot- 1034

In the UK he played in the British Basketball League with the Manchester Giants, Leicester Riders.
