= Donte Grantham =

American-Qatari basketball player (born 1995)

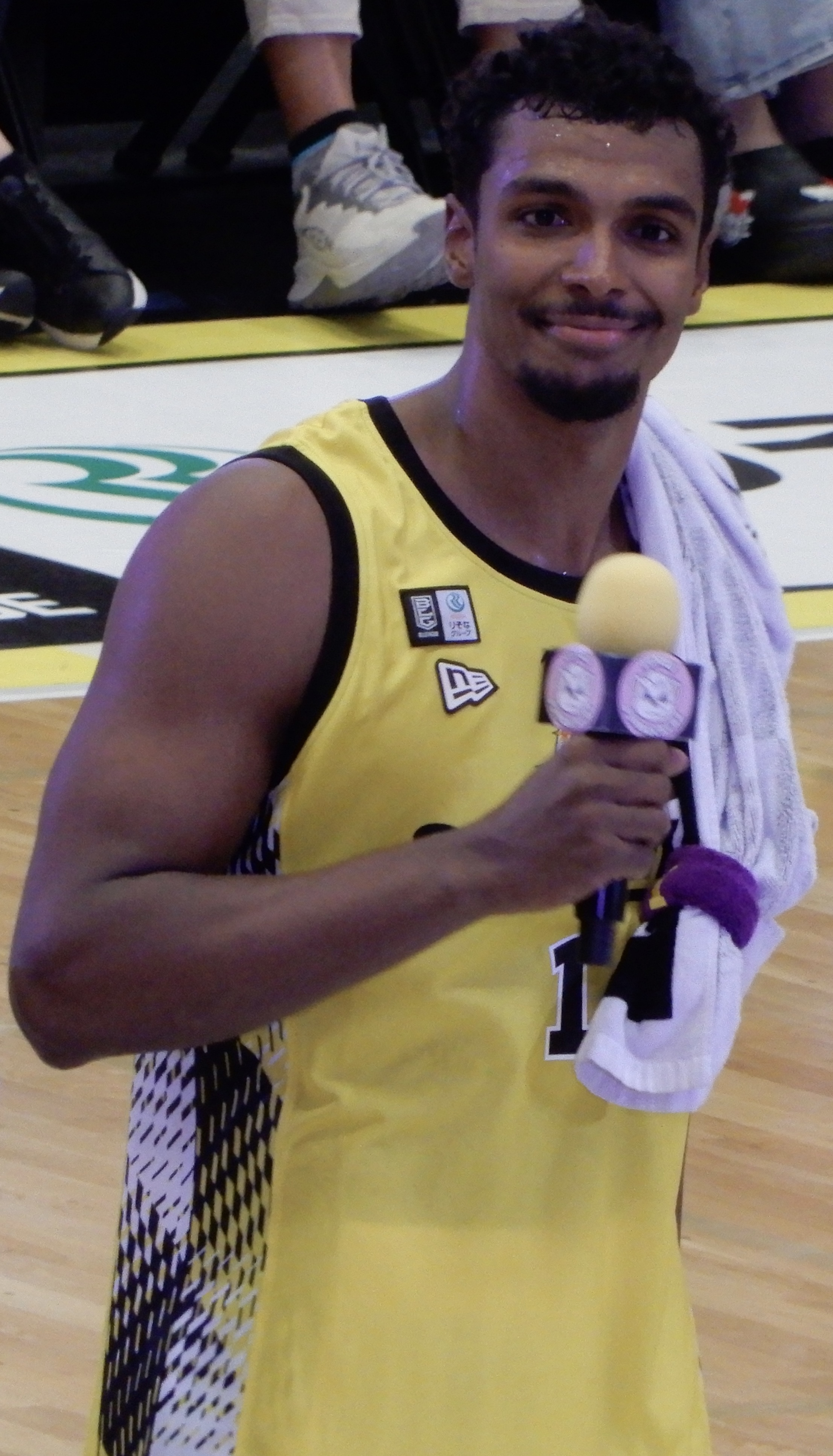
- Grantham with Sun Rockers Shibuya in 2025

No. 0 – Sun Rockers Shibuya
- Position: Small forward

Personal information
- Born: March 19, 1995 (age 31) Martinsburg, West Virginia, U.S.
- Listed height: 6 ft 8 in (2.03 m)
- Listed weight: 210 lb (95 kg)

Career information
- High school: Martinsburg (Martinsburg, West Virginia); Hargrave Military Academy (Chatham, Virginia)
- College: Clemson (2014–2018)
- NBA draft: 2018: undrafted
- Playing career: 2018–present

Career history
- 2018: Oklahoma City Blue
- 2018–2019: Oklahoma City Thunder
- 2018–2019: →Oklahoma City Blue
- 2019–2021: Agua Caliente Clippers
- 2021–2022: Champagne Châlons-Reims
- 2022–2023: SLUC Nancy Basket
- 2023–2024: London Lions
- 2024–2025: Bursaspor
- 2023–present: Sun Rockers Shibuya

Career highlights
- Bill Evans Award (2013)
- Stats at NBA.com
- Stats at Basketball Reference

Donte Lamont Grantham (born March 19, 1995) is an American-Qatari basketball player for Sun Rockers Shibuya of the B.League. He played college basketball for Clemson University.

== College career ==
Grantham competed for the Clemson Tigers, averaging 8.8 points per game as a freshman and 10.2 points per game as a sophomore. His scoring fell to 7.3 points per game as a junior. He averaged 14.2 points and 6.9 rebounds per game as a senior. Grantham suffered a torn ACL in a game against Notre Dame on January 21, 2018, prematurely ending his college career.

== Professional career ==
=== Oklahoma City Blue (2018) ===
After going undrafted in the 2018 NBA draft, Grantham signed with the Oklahoma City Thunder on October 10, 2018. but was later waived two days later. Grantham was later included in the training camp roster of the Oklahoma City Blue.

=== Oklahoma City Thunder (2018–2019) ===
After beginning his professional career with the Oklahoma City Blue of the NBA G League, Grantham was signed to a two-way contract by the Oklahoma City Thunder on December 28, 2018. Grantham made his NBA debut with the Thunder on February 7, 2019, playing in only two minutes of action under a blowout 117–95 win over the Memphis Grizzlies. On July 25, 2019, Grantham was waived by the Oklahoma City Thunder.

=== Agua Caliente Clippers (2019–2021) ===
On August 28, 2019, Grantham signed an Exhibit 10 contract with the Los Angeles Clippers. For the 2019–20 season, Grantham joined the Agua Caliente Clippers of the G League.

On December 15, Grantham posted 25 points, nine rebounds, two assists and a steal in a loss to the Santa Cruz Warriors.

=== Champagne Châlons-Reims (2021–2022) ===
On July 22, 2021, Grantham signed with Champagne Châlons-Reims of the LNB Pro A.

=== SLUC Nancy (2022–2023) ===
On June 11, 2022, Grantham signed with SLUC Nancy Basket of the LNB Pro A.

=== London Lions (2023–2024) ===
On 29 July 2023, Grantham signed with London Lions of the British Basketball League (BBL).

=== Bursaspor Basketbol (2024–2025) ===
On July 23, 2024, he signed with Bursaspor Basketbol of the Basketbol Süper Ligi (BSL).

== Career statistics ==
Legend
GP	Games played	GS	Games started	MPG	Minutes per game
FG%	Field goal percentage	3P%	3-point field goal percentage	FT%	Free throw percentage
RPG	Rebounds per game	APG	Assists per game	SPG	Steals per game
BPG	Blocks per game	PPG	Points per game	**Bold**	Career high

=== NBA ===
==== Regular season ====
Year	Team	GP	GS	MPG	FG%	3P%	FT%	RPG	APG	SPG	BPG	PPG
2018–19	Oklahoma City	3	0	0.7	.000	.000	–	.0	.0	.0	.0	0.0
Career		3	0	0.7	.000	.000	–	.0	.0	.0	.0	0.0

=== College ===
Year	Team	GP	GS	MPG	FG%	3P%	FT%	RPG	APG	SPG	BPG	PPG
2014–15	Clemson	31	31	29.6	.372	.279	.547	4.6	1.7	.9	**1.0**	8.8
2015–16	Clemson	31	31	**32.6**	.384	.354	**.846**	4.1	2.3	**1.0**	.5	10.2
2016–17	Clemson	**33**	**32**	27.7	.383	.325	.742	4.3	1.5	.8	.6	7.3
2017–18	Clemson	19	19	31.8	**.560**	**.419**	.780	**6.9**	**2.4**	.8	.9	**14.2**
Career		114	113	30.2	.414	.333	.726	4.8	1.9	.9	.7	9.6
