= 2024–25 Scottish Basketball Championship Men season =

2024–25 SBC Men season
- League: Scottish Basketball Championship
- Sport: Basketball
- Teams: 13

SBC Competitions
- Division 1 champions: Falkirk Fury (8th title)
- Scottish Cup champions: Dunfermline Reign (1st title)
- SBC Playoffs champions: Falkirk Fury (4th title)

SBC seasons
- ← 2023–24 2025–26 →

The 2024–25 season was the 55th campaign of the Scottish Basketball Championship, the national basketball league of Scotland. 13 teams were split across Division 1, featuring 7 teams, and Division 2, featuring 6 teams. Division 1 and Division 2 matches began on 13 September 2024 and the season concluded with the Division 1 Playoff Final on 29 March 2025. Falkirk Fury won their eighth league title to complete a league and Playoff double, while Dunfermline Reign won the Scottish Cup for the first time.

== Division 1 ==
=== Teams ===
Location of teams in 2024–25 SBC Division 1

Promoted from 2023-24 Division 2

- Glasgow Devils

Relegated from 2023-24 Division 1

- Glasgow University

Withdrew

- Stirling Knights

=== League table ===
| Pos | Team | Pld | W | L | GF | GA | GD | Pts | Qualification or relegation |
|---|---|---|---|---|---|---|---|---|---|
| 1 | Falkirk Fury (C) | 18 | 16 | 2 | 1555 | 1274 | +281 | 34 | Qualification to playoffs |
| 2 | Boroughmuir Blaze | 18 | 12 | 6 | 1307 | 1210 | +97 | 30 | Qualification to playoffs |
| 3 | City of Edinburgh Kings | 18 | 10 | 8 | 1397 | 1350 | +47 | 28 | Qualification to playoffs |
| 4 | Dunfermline Reign | 18 | 9 | 9 | 1321 | 1318 | +3 | 27 | Qualification to playoffs |
| 5 | St Mirren | 18 | 8 | 10 | 1400 | 1442 | −42 | 26 | |
| 6 | Renfrew Rocks | 18 | 7 | 11 | 1345 | 1424 | −79 | 25 | |
| 7 | Glasgow Devils (R) | 18 | 1 | 17 | 1096 | 1406 | −310 | 19 | Relegation to Division 2 |

Source: BasketballScotland
(C) Champions; (R) Relegated

=== Playoffs ===
Semi-finals

21 Mar 2025

| Falkirk Fury | 112–60 | Dunfermline Reign |

Grangemouth Sports Complex, Grangemouth

23 Mar 2025

| Boroughmuir Blaze | 93–81 | City of Edinburgh |

The Crags Centre, Edinburgh

Final

29 Mar 2025

| Falkirk Fury | 84–57 | Boroughmuir Blaze |

Playsport Arena, East Kilbride

== Division 2 ==
=== Teams ===
Location of teams in 2024–25 SBC Division 2

Promoted from 2023-24 Division 2

- Glasgow Devils

Withdrew

- Edinburgh Lions
- Perth Phoenix
- Ayr Storm

=== League table ===
| Pos | Team | Pld | W | L | GF | GA | GD | Pts | Promotion or qualification |
|---|---|---|---|---|---|---|---|---|---|
| 1 | Grampian Ignite (C, P) | 15 | 12 | 3 | 1187 | 942 | +245 | 27 | Promotion to Division 1 |
| 2 | North Lanarkshire Chiefs | 15 | 10 | 5 | 1257 | 1103 | +154 | 25 | |
| 3 | West Lothian Wolves | 15 | 9 | 6 | 1214 | 1160 | +54 | 24 | |
| 4 | Dundee Madsons | 15 | 9 | 6 | 1161 | 1184 | −23 | 24 | |
| 5 | Tayside Musketeers | 15 | 3 | 12 | 896 | 1088 | −192 | 18 | |
| 6 | North Lanarkshire Titans | 15 | 2 | 13 | 831 | 1070 | −239 | 17 | |

Source: BasketballScotland
(C) Champions; (P) Promoted

== Scottish Cup ==
Scottish Cup (basketball)

First Round

04 Oct 2024

| St Mirren | 102–58 | West Lothian Wolves |

05 Oct 2024

| Renfrew Rocks | 85–83 | Tayside Musketeers |

05 Oct 2024

| Highland Bears | 57–89 | Glasgow Devils |

05 Oct 2024

| North Lanarkshire Chiefs | 52–120 | Boroughmuir Blaze |

Quarter-finals

| Falkirk Fury | vs. | Dunfermline Reign |

03 Nov 2024

| Boroughmuir Blaze | 102–73 | Renfrew Rocks |

02 Nov 2024

| City of Edinburgh | 87–80 | St Mirren |

03 Nov 2024

| Glasgow Devils | 83–38 | Aberdeen Arrows |

Semi-finals

29 Nov 2024

| City of Edinburgh | 63–66 | Boroughmuir Blaze |

30 Nov 2024

| Dunfermline Reign | 79–60 | Glasgow Devils |

Final

15 Feb 2025

Report

| Boroughmuir Blaze | 54–67 | Dunfermline Reign |

Regional Performance Centre, Dundee

| Preceded by 2023–24 season | SBC seasons 2024–25 | Succeeded by 2025–26 season |
