= Glasgow University BC =

Glasgow University B.C.
- League: SBC Division 1
- Established: 1947; 79 years ago
- Location: Glasgow, Scotland
- Team colours

Glasgow University Basketball Club is the basketball club representing students and staff at the University of Glasgow in Scotland. The club, founded in 1947, is affiliated with Glasgow University Sports Association and competes in British Universities and Colleges Sport and (until the 2024-25 season) the Scottish Basketball Championship competitions.

== Men's team ==
=== Honours ===
Scottish National League Playoffs (1): 2013-14

=== Season-by-season records ===
Season	Division	Tier	League					Post-Season	Scottish Cup
Season	Division	Tier	Finish	Played	Wins	Losses	Win %	Post-Season	Scottish Cup
Glasgow University
2010–11	SMNL	2	4th	18	11	7	0.611	Semi-finals	
2011–12	SMNL	2	5th	18	9	9	0.500	Semi-finals	
2012–13	SMNL	2	3rd	18	12	6	0.667	Semi-finals	
2013–14	SMNL	2	5th	18	10	8	0.556	Winners	
2014–15	SMNL	2	6th	22	11	11	0.500	Quarter-finals	Quarter-finals
2015–16	SBC Div 1	2	2nd	18	14	4	0.778	Quarter-finals	Semi-finals
2016–17	SBC Div 1	2	9th	18	4	14	0.222	Did not qualify	1st Round
2017–18	SBC Div 1	2	8th	18	4	14	0.222	Quarter-finals	2nd Round
2018–19	SBC Div 1	2	7th	18	8	10	0.444	Quarter-finals	2nd Round
2019–20	SBC Div 1	2	7th	16	5	11	0.313	Quarter-finals	Quarter-finals
2020–21	SBC Div 1	2	No season						
2021–22	SBC Div 1	2	6th	16	6	10	0.375	Did not qualify	Quarter-finals
2022–23	SBC Div 1	2	8th	20	6	14	0.300	Did not qualify	Semi-finals
2023–24	SBC Div 1	2	8th	21	0	21	0.000	Did not qualify	2nd Round

== See also ==
- Glasgow University Sports Association
