= 2025–26 Scottish Basketball Championship Men season =

2025–26 SBC Men season
- League: Scottish Basketball Championship
- Sport: Basketball
- Teams: 12

SBC Competitions
- Division 1 champions: Falkirk Fury (9th title)
- Scottish Cup champions: Falkirk Fury (8th title)
- SBC Playoffs champions: Falkirk Fury (5th title)

SBC seasons
- ← 2024–25 2026–27 →

The 2025–26 season was the 56th campaign of the Scottish Basketball Championship, the national basketball league of Scotland. 12 teams were split across Division 1, featuring 8 teams, and Division 2, featuring 4 teams. Division 1 and Division 2 matches began on 5 September 2025 and the season concluded with the Division 1 Playoff Final on 29 March 2026. Falkirk Fury won their ninth league title, fifth Playoffs title and eighth Scottish Cup to complete a domestic treble.

== Division 1 ==
=== Teams ===
Promoted from 2024-25 Division 2

- Grampian Ignite

New team

- Caledonia Blues

=== League table ===
Pos	Team	Pld	W	L	GF	GA	GD	Pts	Qualification or relegation
1	Falkirk Fury (C)	21	21	0	2184	1512	+672	42	Qualification to playoffs
2	City of Edinburgh Kings	21	15	6	1730	1596	+134	36	Qualification to playoffs
3	Boroughmuir Blaze	21	14	7	1848	1739	+109	35	Qualification to playoffs
4	Renfrew Rocks	21	12	9	1793	1644	+149	33	Qualification to playoffs
5	St Mirren	21	11	10	1831	1764	+67	32	
6	Dunfermline Reign	21	8	13	1615	1743	−128	29	
7	Caledonia Blues	21	2	19	1613	2153	−540	23	
8	Grampian Ignite	21	1	20	1451	1917	−466	22	Relegation Playoff

Source: BasketballScotland
(C) Champions

=== Playoffs ===
Semi-finals

20 Mar 2026

Falkirk Fury	79–76 (OT)	Renfrew Rocks

Grangemouth Sports Complex, Grangemouth

20 Mar 2026

City of Edinburgh Kings	79–76	Boroughmuir Blaze

Portobello H.S., Edinburgh

Final

29 Mar 2026

Falkirk Fury	73–65	City of Edinburgh Kings

Playsport Arena, East Kilbride

== Division 2 ==
=== Teams ===
Promoted from 2024-25 Division 2

- Grampian Ignite

New team

- Perth Phoenix

Withdrew

- Tayside Musketeers
- North Lanarkshire Titans

=== League table ===
Pos	Team	Pld	W	L	GF	GA	GD	Pts	Promotion or qualification
1	West Lothian Wolves (C)	12	10	2	1093	780	+313	22	Promotion Playoff
2	North Lanarkshire Chiefs	12	10	2	1050	870	+180	22	
3	Perth Phoenix	12	3	9	840	1043	−203	15	
4	Dundee Madsons	12	1	11	780	1070	−290	13	

Source: BasketballScotland
(C) Champions

=== Promotion / Relegation Playoff ===
23 May 2026

Grampian Ignite	88–76	West Lothian Wolves

International School, Aberdeen

24 May 2026

West Lothian Wolves	85–85	Grampian Ignite

Bathgate Academy, Bathgate

== Scottish Cup ==
Scottish Cup (basketball)

First Round

Perth Phoenix	76–122	Boroughmuir Blaze

Dunfermline Reign	74–73 (OT)	West Lothian Wolves

Caledonia Blues	101–46	Aberdeen Arrows

City of Edinburgh Kings	68–92	Falkirk Fury

Quarter-finals

Falkirk Fury	w–c	North Lanarkshire Chiefs

Renfrew Rocks	84–82	Boroughmuir Blaze

Dunfermline Reign	78–83	St Mirren

Glasgow Hussars	c–w	Caledonia Blues

Semi-finals

Renfrew Rocks	83–81	St Mirren

Caledonia Blues	73–100	Falkirk Fury

Final

07 Feb 2025

Falkirk Fury	71–68	Renfrew Rocks

Playsport Arena, East Kilbride

Preceded by 2024–25 season	SBC seasons 2025–26	Succeeded by 2026–27 season
