= 2014–15 Scottish Men's National League season =

2014–15 SNBL season
- League: Scottish Men's National League
- Sport: Basketball
- Number of teams: 12

Regular Season

SNBL Competitions

SNBL seasons
- ← 2013–14 2015–16 →

The 2014–15 season was the 46th campaign of the Scottish Men's National League, the national basketball league of Scotland. The season featured 12 teams. Edinburgh University and Tayside Musketeers joined the league. Falkirk Fury won their 4th league title.

A second division was also re-introduced, featuring 7 teams. For the inaugural trial season, the league comprised the second teams of Falkirk, Edinburgh, Stirling and Boroughmuir, plus the addition of the Glasgow Rens, West Lothian Wolves and Granite City Grizzlies.

== Teams ==
Location of teams in 2014–15 Scottish Men's National League

The line-up for the 2014-2015 season featured the following teams:

- Boroughmuir Blaze
- City of Edinburgh Kings
- Clark Eriksson Fury
- Dunfermline Reign
- Edinburgh University
- Glasgow Rocks II
- Glasgow Storm
- Glasgow University
- St Mirren West College Scotland
- Stirling Knights
- Tayside Musketeers
- Troon Tornadoes

== League table ==
Pos	Team	Pld	W	L	GF	GA	GD	Pts	Qualification or relegation
1	Falkirk Fury (C)	22	22	0	1771	1290	+481	44	Qualification for playoffs
2	Boroughmuir Blaze	22	17	5	1703	1431	+272	39	Qualification for playoffs
3	St Mirren West College Scotland	22	16	6	1918	1745	+173	38	Qualification for playoffs
4	Edinburgh University	22	16	6	1580	1264	+316	38	Qualification for playoffs
5	City of Edinburgh Kings	22	15	7	1582	1396	+186	37	Qualification for playoffs
6	Glasgow University	22	11	11	1589	1617	−28	33	Qualification for playoffs
7	Glasgow Storm	22	8	14	1554	1587	−33	30	Qualification for playoffs
8	Troon Tornadoes	22	7	15	1425	1560	−135	29	Qualification for playoffs
9	Dunfermline Reign	22	6	16	1403	1721	−318	28	
10	Tayside Musketeers	22	5	17	1379	1632	−253	27	
11	Glasgow Rocks II (R)	22	5	17	1434	1774	−340	27	Relegated to Division 2
12	Stirling Knights (R)	22	4	18	1390	1711	−321	26	Relegated to Division 2

Source: snblLeagueRepublic
(C) Champions; (R) Relegated

== Playoffs ==
=== Quarter-finals ===
27 March 2015

Falkirk Fury	92–63	Troon Tornadoes

Mariner Centre, Falkirk

29 March 2015

Boroughmuir Blaze	69–54	Glasgow Storm

The Crags Sports Centre, Edinburgh

29 March 2015

Edinburgh University	66–55	Edinburgh Kings

St Leonards Land, Edinburgh

31 March 2015

St Mirren West College Scotland	93–88	Glasgow University

St Ninians High School, Giffnock

=== Semi-finals ===
11 April 2015

Falkirk Fury	75–58	Edinburgh University

Lagoon Leisure Centre Arena, Paisley

11 April 2015

Boroughmuir Blaze	63–39	St Mirren West College Scotland

Lagoon Leisure Centre Court 1, Paisley

=== Final ===
12 April 2015

Falkirk Fury	76–61	Boroughmuir Blaze

Lagoon Leisure Centre Arena, Paisley

== Scottish Cup ==
=== Preliminary round ===
20 September 2014

Pleasance	c–w	St Mirren Buddies

=== Last 16 ===
10 October 2014

Perth Phoenix	47–123	City of Edinburgh Kings

20 October 2014

Glasgow University	67–43	West Lothian Wolves

24 October 2014

St Mirren West College Scotland	116–48	St Mirren Buddies

25 October 2014

Glasgow Rocks II	60–75	Edinburgh University

25 October 2014

Tayside Musketeers	72–64	Dunfermline Reign

25 October 2014

Boroughmuir Blaze	78–49	Glasgow Storm

25 October 2014

Troon Tornadoes	58–81	Falkirk Fury

25 October 2014

Stirling Knights	84–56	Granite City Grizzlies

=== Quarter-finals ===
14 November 2014

Stirling Knights	43–66	Edinburgh University

15 November 2014

Boroughmuir Blaze	105–106	St Mirren West College Scotland

15 November 2014

Glasgow University	86–102	Falkirk Fury

15 November 2014

Tayside Musketeers	46–76	City of Edinburgh Kings

=== Semi-finals ===
13 December 2014

Edinburgh University	88–100	St Mirren West College Scotland

13 December 2014

Falkirk Fury	81–74	City of Edinburgh Kings

=== Final ===
31 January 2015

Falkirk Fury	99–96	St Mirren West College Scotland

Lagoon Leisure Centre, Paisley

Preceded by 2013–14 season	SNBL seasons 2014–15	Succeeded by 2015–16 season
