= 2015–16 Scottish Basketball Championship Men season =

2015–16 SBC season
- League: Scottish Basketball Championship
- Sport: Basketball
- Teams: 16

Regular Season

SBC Competitions

SBC seasons
- ← 2014–15 2016–17 →

The 2015–16 season was the 47th campaign of the Scottish Men's National League, the national basketball league of Scotland. The league was rebranded as part of the Scottish Basketball Championships. 18 teams were split into Division 1, featuring 10 teams, and Division 2, featuring 8 teams. Boroughmuir Blaze won their 10th league title and their first in 38 years.

== Teams ==
Location of teams in 2015–16 Scottish Men's National League Division 1
Location of teams in 2015–16 Scottish Men's National League Division 2

The line-up for the 2015–2016 season features the following teams:

=== Division 1 ===
- Ayrshire Tornadoes
- Boroughmuir Blaze
- City of Edinburgh Kings
- Sony Falkirk Fury
- Dunfermline Reign
- Edinburgh University
- Glasgow Storm
- Glasgow University
- St Mirren West College Scotland
- Tayside Musketeers

=== Division 2 ===
- Boroughmuir Blaze B
- City of Edinburgh Kings B
- Glasgow Rocks II
- Glasgow University B
- Granite City Grizzlies
- Leuchars
- Stirling Knights
- West Lothian Wolves

Prior to the start of the season, Leuchars and Glasgow Rocks II withdrew from the league, leaving Division 2 with 6 teams.

== Format ==
In Division 1, each team played each other twice, once home, once away, for a total of 18 games.

In Division 2, each team played each other three times, once home, once away, and once home or away, for a total of 15 games.

== Division 1 ==
=== League table ===
Pos	Team	Pld	W	L	GF	GA	GD	Pts	
1	Boroughmuir Blaze (C)	18	15	3	1457	1217	+240	33	Qualification for playoffs
2	Glasgow University	18	14	4	1320	1200	+120	32	Qualification for playoffs
3	Edinburgh University	18	13	5	1299	1066	+233	31	Qualification for playoffs
4	St Mirren WCS	18	12	6	1519	1345	+174	30	Qualification for playoffs
5	Sony Centre Falkirk Fury	18	12	6	1365	1277	+88	30	Qualification for playoffs
6	City of Edinburgh Kings	18	9	9	1320	1291	+29	27	Qualification for playoffs
7	Glasgow Storm	18	6	12	1235	1379	−144	24	Qualification for playoffs
8	Tayside Musketeers	18	4	14	1122	1315	−193	22	Qualification for playoffs
9	Dunfermline Reign	18	3	15	1207	1562	−355	21	
10	Ayrshire Tornadoes (R)	18	2	16	1233	1473	−240	20	Relegation to Division 2

Source: BasketballScotland
(C) Champions; (R) Relegated

=== Playoffs ===
Quarter-finals

4 March 2016

St Mirren West College Scotland	59–69	Falkirk Fury

Lagoon Leisure Centre, Paisley

5 March 2016

Glasgow University	50–62	Glasgow Storm

Stevenson Building, University of Glasgow

5 March 2016

Boroughmuir Blaze	80–64	Tayside Musketeers

The Crags Sports Centre, Edinburgh

5 March 2016

Edinburgh University	70–57	City of Edinburgh Kings

Pleasance Sports Centre, University of Edinburgh

Semi-finals

13 March 2016

Boroughmuir Blaze	76–67	Falkirk Fury

The Crags Sports Centre, Edinburgh

13 March 2016

Edinburgh University	w–c	Glasgow Storm

Pleasance Sports Centre, University of Edinburgh

Final

19 March 2016

Boroughmuir Blaze	76–71	Edinburgh University

Pleasance Sports Centre, University of Edinburgh

== Division 2 ==
=== League table ===
Pos	Team	Pld	W	L	GF	GA	GD	Pts	
1	Stirling Knights (C, P)	15	11	4	937	851	+86	26	Promotion to Division 1
2	Granite City Grizzlies	15	11	4	1059	830	+229	26	
3	West Lothian Wolves	15	7	8	866	880	−14	22	
4	City of Edinburgh Kings B	15	6	9	805	875	−70	21	
5	Boroughmuir Blaze B	15	6	9	825	828	−3	21	
6	Glasgow University B	15	3	12	666	894	−228	18	

Source: basketballscotland.co.uk
(C) Champions; (P) Promoted

== Scottish Cup ==
Scottish Cup (basketball)

=== Preliminary round ===
20 September 2015

West Lothian Wolves	47–29	Pleasance

Bathgate Academy, Bathgate

=== 1st Round ===
9 October 2015

Perth Phoenix	51–77	Glasgow Storm

Perth Academy, Perth

17 October 2015

St Mirren Buddies	50–79	Dunfermline Reign

Lagoon Leisure Centre, Paisley

18 October 2015

City of Edinburgh Kings	54–64	St Mirren West College Scotland

Portobello High School, Edinburgh

17 October 2015

Boroughmuir Blaze	86–71	Tayside Musketeers

The Crags Sports Centre, Edinburgh

17 October 2015

Police Scotland Aberdeen	100–101	Stirling Knights

Beach Leisure Centre, Aberdeen

17 October 2015

Ayrshire Tornadoes	39–80	Edinburgh University

Stewarton Sports Centre, Stewarton

17 October 2015

Glasgow University	88–56	Granite City Grizzlies

Stevenson Building, University of Glasgow

18 October 2015

West Lothian Wolves	52–72	Sony Centre Fury

Bathgate Academy, Bathgate

=== Quarter-finals ===
14 November 2015

Glasgow Storm	85–75	Dunfermline Reign

Scotstoun Leisure Centre, Glasgow

13 November 2015

St Mirren West College Scotland	81–72	Boroughmuir Blaze

Lagoon Leisure Centre, Paisley

14 November 2015

Stirling Knights	58–78	Edinburgh University

The Peak, Stirling

14 November 2015

Glasgow University	66–42	Sony Falkirk Fury

Stevenson Building, University of Glasgow

=== Semi-finals ===
19 December 2015

Glasgow Storm	74–86	St Mirren West College Scotland

Scotstoun Leisure Centre, Glasgow

13 December 2015

Edinburgh University	59–46	Glasgow University

The Crags Sports Centre, Edinburgh

=== Final ===
30 January 2016

St Mirren West College Scotland	90–75	Edinburgh University

Lagoon Leisure Centre, Paisley

Preceded by 2014–15 season	SBC seasons 2015–16	Succeeded by 2016–17 season
