= 2015–16 Scottish Basketball Championship Women season =

2015–16 SBC Women season
- League: Scottish Basketball Championship Women
- Sport: Basketball
- Number of teams: 10

Regular Season

SBC Women Competitions

SBC Women seasons
- ← 2014–15 2016–17 →

The 2015–16 season of the Scottish Women's National League. 10 teams featured in a single division. In September 2015, Scottish National Basketball League (SNBL) was rebranded as part of the Scottish Basketball Championship (SBC).

== Teams ==
The following teams make up the division:

- St Andrews University
- Boroughmuir Blaze
- City of Edinburgh Kool Kats
- Sony Centre Fury
- South Lanarkshire Colliers
- Edinburgh University
- Lady Rocks
- Polonia Phoenix
- St Mirren West College Scotland
- Tayside Musketeers

== Results ==
=== Regular season ===
Pos	Team	Pld	W	L	GF	GA	GD	Pts	Qualification
1	Edinburgh University	18	18	0	1434	717	+717	36	League champions
2	Tayside Musketeers	18	14	4	1176	1031	+145	32	
3	City of Edinburgh Kool Kats	18	14	4	1123	976	+147	32	
4	Lady Rocks	18	13	5	1272	1078	+194	31	
5	Sony Centre Fury	18	7	11	984	1054	−70	25	
6	Boroughmuir Blaze	18	7	11	946	1130	−184	25	
7	St Andrews University	18	6	12	938	1134	−196	24	
8	Polonia Phoenix	18	6	12	807	977	−170	24	
9	South Lanarkshire Colliers	18	2	16	762	1076	−314	20	
10	St Mirren WCS	18	2	16	472	741	−269	20	

Source: http://www.basketballscotland.co.uk/scottish-basketball-championships/

=== Notes ===
St Mirren conceded their final seven games of the regular season.
The match between St Andrews University and South Lanarkshire Colliers was declared void, with each team awarded 1 point.

=== Playoffs ===
Quarter finals

5 March 2016
11:00

City of Edinburgh Kool Kats	vs.	Boroughmuir Blaze

5 March 2016
12:20

Tayside Musketeers	vs.	St Andrews University

6 March 2016
19:20

Lady Rocks	vs.	Sony Centre Falkirk Fury

8 March 2016

Edinburgh University	vs.	Polonia Phoenix

=== Scottish Cup ===
Round 1

10 October 2015

Boroughmuir Blaze	39–52	South Lanarkshire Colliers

17 October 2015

City of Edinburgh Kool Kats	79–45	Granite City Grizzlies

29 September 2015

Polonia Phoenix	37–40	St Mirren West College Scotland

11 October 2015

St Andrews University	86–67	Lady Rocks

Quarter finals

Edinburgh University	W–C	South Lanarkshire Colliers

15 November 2015

Tayside Musketeers	49–57	City of Edinburgh Kool Kats

St Mirren West College Scotland	W–C	Glasgow University

10 November 2015

St Andrews University	51–40	Sony Centre Fury

Semi finals

13 December 2015

Edinburgh University	102–54	City of Edinburgh Kool Kats

11 December 2015

St Mirren West College Scotland	44–73	St Andrews University

Final

31 January 2016

Edinburgh University	77–30	St Andrews University
