= 2002–03 Scottish Men's National League season =

2002–03 SNBL season
- League: Scottish Men's National League
- Sport: Basketball
- Number of teams: 10

Regular Season

SMNL seasons
- ← 2001–02 2003–04 →

The 2002–03 season was the 34th campaign of the Scottish Men's National League, the national basketball league of Scotland. The season featured 10 teams; from the previous season, Arbroath Musketeers and East Lothian Peregrines joined the league and Aberdeen Buccaneers did not return. City of Edinburgh Kings won their first league title.

== Teams ==
Location of teams in 2002–03 Scottish Men's National League

The line-up for the 2002–03 season featured the following teams:

- Arbroath Musketeers
- Boroughmuir
- City of Edinburgh Kings
- Clark Erikkson Fury
- Dunfermline Reign
- East Lothian Peregrines
- Glasgow d2
- Glasgow Storm
- St Mirren Reid Kerr College
- Troon Tornadoes

== League table ==
Pos	Team	Pld	W	L	%	Pts
1	City of Edinburgh Kings	18	17	1	0.944	35
2	Troon Tornadoes	18	15	3	0.833	33
3	St Mirren Reid Kerr College	18	13	5	0.722	31
4	Clark Erikkson Fury	18	12	6	0.667	30
5	East Lothian Peregrines	18	11	7	0.612	29
6	Dunfermline Reign	18	10	8	0.556	28
7	Glasgow d2	18	6	12	0.333	24
8	Boroughmuir	18	4	14	0.222	22
9	Glasgow Storm	18	2	16	0.111	20
10	Arbroath Musketeers	18	0	18	0.000	18

Source: Scottish National League 2002-03 - Britball

Preceded by 2001–02 season	SNBL seasons 2002–03	Succeeded by 2003–04 season
