= 2003–04 Scottish Men's National League season =

2003–04 SNBL season
- League: Scottish Men's National League
- Sport: Basketball
- Number of teams: 10

Regular Season

SMNL seasons
- ← 2002–03 2004–05 →

The 2003–04 season was the 35th campaign of the Scottish Men's National League, the national basketball league of Scotland. The season featured 10 teams; from the previous season, St Mirren Buddies joined the league and Arbroath Musketeers did not return. City of Edinburgh Kings won their second league title with an unbeaten season.

== Teams ==
Location of teams in 2003–04 Scottish Men's National League

The line-up for the 2003–04 season featured the following teams:

- Boroughmuir
- City of Edinburgh Kings
- Clark Erikkson Fury
- Dunfermline Reign
- East Lothian Peregrines
- Glasgow d2
- Glasgow Storm
- St Mirren Reid Kerr College
- St Mirren Buddies
- Troon Tornadoes

== League table ==
Pos	Team	Pld	W	L	%	Pts
1	City of Edinburgh Kings	18	18	0	1.000	36
2	Clark Erikkson Fury	18	13	5	0.722	31
3	Troon Tornadoes	18	12	6	0.667	30
4	St Mirren Reid Kerr College	18	12	6	0.667	30
5	East Lothian Peregrines	18	11	7	0.612	29
6	Dunfermline Reign	18	10	8	0.556	28
7	Boroughmuir	18	8	10	0.444	26
8	Glasgow d2	18	4	14	0.222	22
9	Glasgow Storm	18	1	17	0.056	19
10	St Mirren Buddies	18	1	17	0.056	19

Source: Scottish National League 2003-04 - Britball

Preceded by 2002–03 season	SNBL seasons 2003–04	Succeeded by 2004–05 season
