= 2023–24 Scottish Basketball Championship Men season =

2023–24 SBC Men season
- League: Scottish Basketball Championship
- Sport: Basketball
- Number of teams: 18

SBC Competitions
- Division 1 champions: Falkirk Fury (7th title)
- Scottish Cup champions: Falkirk Fury (7th title)
- SBC Playoffs champions: Falkirk Fury (3rd title)

SBC seasons
- ← 2022–23 2024–25 →

The 2023–24 season was the 54th campaign of the Scottish Basketball Championship, the national basketball league of Scotland. 18 teams were split across Division 1, featuring 8 teams, and Division 2, featuring 10 teams. Division 1 and Division 2 matches began on October 13, 2023.

== Division 1 ==
=== Teams ===
Location of teams in 2023–24 SBC Division 1

=== League table ===
Pos	Team	Pld	W	L	GF	GA	GD	Pts	Qualification or relegation
1	Falkirk Fury (C)	21	19	2	1905	1527	+378	38	Qualification to playoffs
2	Boroughmuir Blaze	21	18	3	1932	1661	+271	36	Qualification to playoffs
3	St Mirren	21	14	7	1779	1714	+65	28	Qualification to playoffs
4	Stirling Knights	21	11	10	1678	1680	−2	22	Qualification to playoffs
5	City of Edinburgh Kings	21	9	12	1756	1722	+34	18	
6	Dunfermline Reign	21	9	12	1514	1609	−95	18	
7	Renfrew Rocks	21	4	17	1626	1816	−190	8	
8	Glasgow University (R)	21	0	21	1306	1760	−454	0	Relegation to Division 2

Source: BasketballScotland
(C) Champions; (R) Relegated

=== Playoffs ===
Semi-finals

06 Apr 2024

Falkirk Fury	82–75	Stirling Knights

Regional Performance Centre, Dundee

06 Apr 2024

Boroughmuir Blaze	84–92	St Mirren

Regional Performance Centre, Dundee

Final

07 Apr 2024

Falkirk Fury	93–64	St Mirren

Regional Performance Centre, Dundee

== Division 2 ==
=== Teams ===
Location of teams in 2023–24 SBC Division 2

Relegated from 2022-23 Division 1

- Edinburgh Lions
- North Lanarkshire Chiefs
- West Lothian Wolves

New team

- North Lanarkshire Titans

Withdrew

- Pleasance

=== League table ===
Pos	Team	Pld	W	L	GF	GA	GD	Pts	Promotion or qualification
1	Edinburgh Lions (C)	17	16	1	1331	974	+357	32	
2	North Lanarkshire Titans	18	15	3	1455	1061	+394	30	
3	Glasgow Devils (P)	18	12	6	1471	1170	+301	24	Promotion to Division 1
4	Grampian Flyers	16	10	6	1176	992	+184	20	
5	North Lanarkshire Chiefs	18	9	9	1415	1283	+132	18	
6	West Lothian Wolves	16	9	7	1248	1075	+173	18	
7	Dundee Madsons	17	7	10	1190	1251	−61	14	
8	Tayside Musketeers	15	5	10	974	941	+33	10	
9	Ayr Storm	17	2	15	898	1469	−571	4	
10	Perth Phoenix	18	0	18	947	1910	−963	0	

Updated to match(es) played on 03 April 2024. Source: BasketballScotland
(C) Champions; (P) Promoted

== Scottish Cup ==
Scottish Cup (basketball)

First Round

06 Oct 2023

Tayside Musketeers	60–67	Aberdeen University

29 Oct 2023

City of Edinburgh Kings	102–27	Aberdeen Arrows

07 Oct 2023

Highland Bears	53–49	Perth Phoenix

06 Oct 2023

Ayr Storm	76–98	North Lanarkshire Titans

06 Oct 2023

Stirling University	53–58	Dundee Madsons

Second Round

Falkirk Fury	w–c	Aberdeen University

05 Nov 2023

Stirling Knights	103–67	West Lothian Wolves

19 Nov 2023

City of Edinburgh Kings	84–45	Grampian Flyers

19 Nov 2023

Highland Bears	74–131	Boroughmuir Blaze

03 Nov 2023

Renfrew Rocks	74–81	Dunfermline Reign

18 Nov 2023

North Lanarkshire Titans	81–48	Dundee Madsons

30 Oct 2023

North Lanarkshire Chiefs	64–71	Edinburgh Lions

06 Oct 2023

St Mirren	93–37	Glasgow University

Quarter Finals

10 Dec 2023

Edinburgh Lions	97–93	St Mirren

05 Dec 2023

Dunfermline Reign	84–56	North Lanarkshire Titans

08 Dec 2023

Falkirk Fury	82–62	Stirling Knights

12 Dec 2023

City of Edinburgh Kings	87–98	Boroughmuir Blaze

Semi Finals

16 Jan 2024

Dunfermline Reign	85–67	Edinburgh Lions

02 Feb 2024

Falkirk Fury	99–91	Boroughmuir Blaze

Final

10 Feb 2024

Falkirk Fury	79–67	Dunfermline Reign

Regional Performance Centre, Dundee

Preceded by 2022–23 season	SBC seasons 2023–24	Succeeded by 2024–25 season
