= 2001–02 Scottish Men's National League season =

2001–02 SNBL season
- League: Scottish Men's National League
- Sport: Basketball
- Number of teams: 9

Regular Season

SMNL seasons
- ← 2000–01 2002–03 →

The 2001–02 season was the 33rd campaign of the Scottish Men's National League, the national basketball league of Scotland. The season featured 9 teams; from the previous season Glasgow Storm joined the league, and long-standing members Midlothian Bulls and Paisley did not return. Troon Tornadoes won their first league title.

== Teams ==
Location of teams in 2001–02 Scottish Men's National League

The line-up for the 2001–02 season featured the following teams:

- Aberdeen Buccaneers
- Boroughmuir
- City of Edinburgh Kings
- Clark Erikkson Fury
- Dunfermline Reign
- Glasgow d2
- Glasgow Storm
- St Mirren McDonalds
- Troon Tornadoes

== League table ==
Pos	Team	Pld	W	L	%	Pts
1	Troon Tornadoes	16	14	2	0.875	30
2	St Mirren Reid Kerr College	16	13	3	0.813	29
3	City of Edinburgh Kings	16	12	4	0.750	28
4	Clark Erikkson Fury	16	11	5	0.688	27
5	Dunfermline Reign	16	7	9	0.438	23
6	Glasgow d2	16	6	10	0.375	22
7	Glasgow Storm	16	4	12	0.250	20
8	Boroughmuir	16	3	13	0.188	18
9	Aberdeen Buccaneers	16	2	14	0.125	17

Source: Scottish National League 2001-02 - Britball

Preceded by 2000–01 season	SNBL seasons 2001–02	Succeeded by 2002–03 season
