= 2010–11 Scottish Men's National League season =

2010–11 SNBL season
- League: Scottish Men's National League
- Sport: Basketball
- Number of teams: 10

Regular Season

SNBL Competitions

SNBL seasons
- ← 2009–10 2011–12 →

The 2010–11 season was the 42nd campaign of the Scottish Men's National League, the national basketball league of Scotland. The season featured 10 teams, including four new teams from the previous season; Stirling Knights, Dunfermline Reign, Glasgow University and the second team of BBL side Glasgow Rocks joined the league. City of Edinburgh Kings won their 8th league title.

== Teams ==
Location of teams in 2010–11 Scottish Men's National League

The line-up for the 2010-2011 season features the following teams:

- City of Edinburgh Kings
- Clark Eriksson Fury
- Dunfermline Reign
- East Lothian Peregrines
- Glasgow Rocks II
- Glasgow Storm
- Glasgow University
- St Mirren Reid Kerr College
- Stirling Knights
- Troon Tornadoes

== League table ==
Pos	Team	Pld	W	L	GF	GA	GD	Pts	Qualification
1	City of Edinburgh Kings (C)	18	17	1	1665	1001	+664	35	Qualification to playoffs
2	Falkirk Fury	18	16	2	1586	1210	+376	34	Qualification to playoffs
3	St Mirren Reid Kerr College	18	13	5	1465	1259	+206	31	Qualification to playoffs
4	Glasgow University	18	11	7	1377	1263	+114	29	Qualification to playoffs
5	Stirling Knights	18	11	7	1412	1408	+4	29	
6	Troon Tornadoes	18	8	10	1248	1225	+23	26	
7	Glasgow Rocks II	18	5	13	1282	1562	−280	23	
8	Glasgow Storm	18	5	13	1180	1461	−281	23	
9	East Lothian Peregrines	18	3	15	1211	1517	−306	21	
10	Dunfermline Reign	18	1	17	1155	1675	−520	19	

Source: Gameday SportsTg
(C) Champions

== Playoffs ==
Final

City of Edinburgh Kings	93–62	St Mirren Reid Kerr College

Preceded by 2009–10 season	SNBL seasons 2010–11	Succeeded by 2011–12 season
