= 2016–17 Scottish Basketball Championship Men season =

2016–17 SBC season
- League: Scottish Basketball Championship
- Sport: Basketball
- Number of teams: 18

Regular Season

SBC Competitions

SBC seasons
- ← 2015–16 2017–18 →

The 2016–17 season was the 48th campaign of the Scottish Basketball Championship, the national basketball league of Scotland. 18 teams were split into Division 1, featuring 10 teams, and Division 2, featuring 8 teams. Falkirk Fury won their 5th league title.

== Teams ==
Location of teams in 2016–17 SBC Division 1
Location of teams in 2016–17 SBC Division 2

The line-up for the 2016-17 season features the following teams:

=== Division 1 ===
- Boroughmuir Blaze
- City of Edinburgh Kings
- Dunfermline Reign
- Edinburgh University
- Sony Centre Fury
- Glasgow Storm
- Glasgow University
- Stirling Knights
- St Mirren West College Scotland
- Tayside Musketeers

=== Division 2 ===
- Ayrshire Tornadoes
- Boroughmuir Blaze B
- City of Edinburgh Kings B
- Edinburgh Lions
- Glasgow University B
- Heriot Watt University
- Pleasance
- West Lothian Wolves

== Format ==
In Division 1, each team plays each other twice, once home, once away, for a total of 18 games.

In Division 2, each team plays each other twice, once home, once away, for a total of 14 games.

== Division 1 ==
=== League table ===
| Pos | Team | Pld | W | L | GF | GA | GD | Pts | |
|---|---|---|---|---|---|---|---|---|---|
| 1 | Sony Centre Falkirk Fury (C) | 18 | 16 | 2 | 1287 | 1032 | +255 | 34 | Qualification to playoffs |
| 2 | St Mirren WCS | 18 | 15 | 3 | 1346 | 1151 | +195 | 33 | Qualification to playoffs |
| 3 | Boroughmuir Blaze | 18 | 14 | 4 | 1398 | 1203 | +195 | 32 | Qualification to playoffs |
| 4 | City of Edinburgh Kings | 18 | 13 | 5 | 1177 | 1081 | +96 | 31 | Qualification to playoffs |
| 5 | Glasgow Storm | 18 | 9 | 9 | 1113 | 1125 | −12 | 27 | Qualification to playoffs |
| 6 | Stirling Knights | 18 | 7 | 11 | 963 | 1210 | −247 | 25 | Qualification to playoffs |
| 7 | Edinburgh University | 18 | 6 | 12 | 1013 | 1142 | −129 | 24 | Qualification to playoffs |
| 8 | Dunfermline Reign | 18 | 6 | 12 | 1283 | 1282 | +1 | 24 | Qualification to playoffs |
| 9 | Glasgow University | 18 | 4 | 14 | 933 | 1067 | −134 | 22 | |
| 10 | Tayside Musketeers* | 18 | 0 | 18 | 471 | 691 | −220 | 11 | Withdrawn from League |

Source: BasketballScotland
(C) Champions
- Tayside Musketeers, sitting with a 2-9 record, withdrew from the league thereby conceding their final seven games of the season. Their two wins, against Stirling Knights (79-71), and Edinburgh University (75-73) were expunged and replaced with 20-0 defeats.

=== Playoffs ===
==== Quarter-finals ====
10 Mar 2017

| Sony Centre Fury | 81–70 | Dunfermline Reign |

10 Mar 2017

| St Mirren WCS | 94–69 | Edinburgh University |

10 Mar 2017

| Boroughmuir Blaze | 118–105 | Stirling Knights |

11 Mar 2017

| City of Edinburgh Kings | 66–72 | Glasgow Storm |

==== Semi-finals ====
17 Mar 2017

| Sony Centre Fury | 68–58 | Glasgow Storm |

17 Mar 2017

| St Mirren WCS | 77–83 | Boroughmuir Blaze |

==== Final ====
2 Apr 2017
16:00 GMT

| Sony Centre Fury | 95–75 | Boroughmuir Blaze |

== Division 2 ==
=== League table ===
| Pos | Team | Pld | W | L | GF | GA | GD | Pts | |
|---|---|---|---|---|---|---|---|---|---|
| 1 | Pleasance (C, P) | 14 | 12 | 2 | 957 | 705 | +252 | 26 | Qualification to playoffs |
| 2 | Heriot Watt University | 14 | 11 | 3 | 885 | 761 | +124 | 25 | Qualification to playoffs |
| 3 | Edinburgh Lions | 14 | 9 | 5 | 880 | 806 | +74 | 23 | Qualification to playoffs |
| 4 | West Lothian Wolves | 14 | 7 | 7 | 851 | 829 | +22 | 21 | Qualification to playoffs |
| 5 | Boroughmuir Blaze B | 14 | 7 | 7 | 846 | 919 | −73 | 21 | |
| 6 | Ayrshire Tornadoes | 14 | 5 | 9 | 867 | 909 | −42 | 19 | |
| 7 | City of Edinburgh Kings B | 14 | 4 | 10 | 768 | 922 | −154 | 18 | |
| 8 | Glasgow University B | 14 | 1 | 13 | 683 | 886 | −203 | 15 | |

Source: BasketballScotland
(C) Champions; (P) Promoted

=== Playoffs ===
==== Semi-finals ====
15 Mar 2017

| Pleasance | 79–59 | West Lothian Wolves |

17 Mar 2017

| Heriot Watt University | 55–61 | Edinburgh Lions |

==== Final ====
25 Mar 2017
15:45 GMT

| Pleasance | 96–67 | Edinburgh Lions |

== Scottish Cup ==
Scottish Cup (basketball)

=== Preliminary round ===
28 Sep 2016

| Heriot Watt University | 60–70 | Pleasance |

24 Sep 2016

| Ayrshire Tornadoes | 75–65 | Perth Phoenix |

25 Sep 2016

| Highland Bears | 54–58 | West Lothian Wolves |

=== 1st Round ===
28 Oct 2016

| City of Edinburgh Kings | 52–44 | Glasgow University |

28 Oct 2016

| Ayrshire Tornadoes | 57–89 | Glasgow Storm |

30 Oct 2016

| Portlethen Panthers | 70–89 | Boroughmuir Blaze |

28 Oct 2016

| St Mirren Buddies | 54–99 | Dunfermline Reign |

| Granite City Grizzlies | C–W | St Mirren West College Scotland |

28 Oct 2016

| Sony Centre Fury | 84–58 | Stirling Knights |

26 Oct 2016

| Pleasance | 70–63 | West Lothian Wolves |

29 Oct 2016

| Tayside Musketeers | 56–72 | Edinburgh University |

=== Quarter-finals ===
18 Nov 2016

| City of Edinburgh Kings | 67–44 | Glasgow Storm |

18 Nov 2016

| Boroughmuir Blaze | 86–74 | Dunfermline Reign |

18 Nov 2016

| St Mirren West College Scotland | 62–73 | Sony Centre Fury |

21 Nov 2016

| Pleasance | 45–75 | Edinburgh University |

=== Semi-finals ===
10 Dec 2016

| City of Edinburgh Kings | 70–79 | Boroughmuir Blaze |

9 Dec 2016

| Sony Centre Fury | 76–63 | Edinburgh University |

=== Final ===
4 Feb 2017
18:00

| Boroughmuir Blaze | 54–59 | Sony Centre Fury |

Oriam, Edinburgh

== Chairman's Cup ==
The Chairman's Cup is a national knockout competition for teams who play outwith the National League system.

=== Preliminary round ===
| St Mirren WCS Buddies | 78–53 | Ayr Storm |

| Glasgow University CC | 41–80 | EAST Warriors Aberdeen |

| Granite City Grizzlies | 52–71 | Highland Bears |

| Pleasance B | 44–70 | Portlethen Panthers |

=== 1st Round ===
| BC Lituanica Aberdeen | W–C | Banchory Stags |

| West Lothian Wolves B | 38–95 | St Mirren WCS Buddies |

| Glasgow Fever | 53–27 | Glasgow Storm B |

| Edinburgh Lions B | 67–45 | Glasgow Eagles |

| EAST Warriors Aberdeen | 68–63 | Highland Bears |

| Dundee Madsons | 59–72 | Paisley |

| Perth Phoenix | 69–47 | Pleasance B |

| Renfrew Rocks | 62–69 | Portlethen Panthers |

=== Quarter-finals ===
| St Mirren WCS Buddies | 77–81 | BC Lituanica Aberdeen |

| Edinburgh Lions B | 34–71 | Glasgow Fever |

| EAST Warriors Aberdeen | 83–73 | Paisley |

| Perth Phoenix | 53–61 | Portlethen Panthers |

=== Semi-finals ===
| BC Lituanica Aberdeen | 70–67 | Glasgow Fever |

| EAST Warriors Aberdeen | 61–80 | Portlethen Panthers |

=== Final ===
25 Mar 2017

| BC Lituanica Aberdeen | 63–60 | Portlethen Panthers |

| Preceded by 2015–16 season | SBC seasons 2016–17 | Succeeded by 2017–18 season |
