= 2022–23 Scottish Basketball Championship Men season =

Professional sports league season

2022–23 SBC Men season
- League: Scottish Basketball Championship
- Sport: Basketball
- Number of teams: 18

SBC Competitions
- Division 1 champions: Boroughmuir Blaze (11th title)
- Scottish Cup champions: Boroughmuir Blaze (12th title)
- SBC Playoffs champions: Boroughmuir Blaze (2nd title)

SBC seasons
- ← 2021–22 2023-24 →

The 2022–23 season was the 53rd campaign of the Scottish Basketball Championship, the national basketball league of Scotland. 18 teams were split across Division 1, featuring 11 teams, and Division 2, featuring 7 teams.

== Division 1 ==
=== Teams ===
Location of teams in 2022–23 SBC Division 1

Promoted from 2021 to 2022 Division 2

- Renfrew Rocks
- North Lanarkshire Chiefs

=== League table ===
Pos	Team	Pld	W	L	GF	GA	GD	Pts	Qualification or relegation
1	Boroughmuir Blaze (C)	20	18	2	1884	1359	+525	56	Qualification to playoffs
2	Falkirk Fury	20	17	3	1808	1334	+474	54	Qualification to playoffs
3	St Mirren	20	17	3	1747	1495	+252	54	Qualification to playoffs
4	City of Edinburgh Kings	20	13	7	1616	1439	+177	46	Qualification to playoffs
5	Dunfermline Reign	20	11	9	1663	1541	+122	42	
6	Stirling Knights	20	11	9	1426	1385	+41	42	
7	Renfrew Rocks	20	8	12	1414	1525	−111	36	
8	Glasgow University	20	6	14	1403	1557	−154	32	
9	Edinburgh Lions (R)	20	4	16	1321	1678	−357	28	Relegation to Division 2
10	West Lothian Wolves (R)	20	3	17	1306	1799	−493	26	Relegation to Division 2
11	North Lanarkshire Chiefs (R)	20	2	18	1205	1681	−476	24	Relegation to Division 2

Source: BasketballScotland
(C) Champions; (R) Relegated

=== Playoffs ===
Semi-finals

7 Apr 2023

Report

Falkirk Fury	88–58	St Mirren

Falkirk

14 Apr 2023

Report

St Mirren	72–82	Falkirk Fury
Falkirk win 170-130 on aggregate

Paisley

6 Apr 2023

City of Edinburgh Kings	74–82	Boroughmuir Blaze

Edinburgh

16 Apr 2023

Boroughmuir Blaze	84–79	City of Edinburgh Kings
Boroughmuir win 166-153 on aggregate

Edinburgh

Final

21 Apr 2023

Report

Falkirk Fury	83–86	Boroughmuir Blaze

Falkirk

29 Apr 2023

Report

Boroughmuir Blaze	79–76	Falkirk Fury
Boroughmuir win 165-159 on aggregate

Edinburgh

== Division 2 ==
=== Teams ===
Location of teams in 2022–23 SBC Division 2

New teams

- Glasgow Devils
- Grampian Flyers
- Perth Phoenix

=== League table ===
Pos	Team	Pld	W	L	GF	GA	GD	Pts
1	Glasgow Devils (C)	18	16	2	1327	995	+332	50
2	Grampian Flyers	18	16	2	1464	1001	+463	50
3	Dundee Madsons	18	11	7	1312	1128	+184	40
4	Tayside Musketeers	18	9	9	1172	1117	+55	36
5	Pleasance	18	6	12	1095	1294	−199	30
6	Ayr Storm	18	3	15	1172	1556	−384	24
7	Perth Phoenix	18	2	16	1005	1456	−451	22

Source: BasketballScotland
(C) Champions

== Scottish Cup ==
Scottish Cup (basketball)

First Round

5 Nov 2022

Glasgow Devils	63–66	North Lanarkshire Titans

10 Oct 2022

Tayside Musketeers	83–86	Grampian Flyers

3 Oct 2022

Glasgow Olympians	61–77	Glasgow University

10 Oct 2022

Pleasance	73–69	Stirling University

9 Oct 2022

Renfrew Rocks	55–87	Falkirk Fury

8 Oct 2022

St Mirren	111–49	Banchory Stags

9 Oct 2022

Edinburgh Lions	63–87	City of Edinburgh Kings

Second Round

8 Dec 2022

Ayr Storm	93–37	North Lanarkshire Titans

13 Nov 2022

Grampian Flyers	70–79	West Lothian Wolves

10 Nov 2022

Lockerbie Tornadoes	76–100	Glasgow University

14 Nov 2022

Pleasance	66–56	Dundee Madsons

22 Nov 2022

Perth Phoenix	25–110	Falkirk Fury

30 Oct 2022

St Mirren	91–74	North Lanarkshire Chiefs

17 Nov 2022

Dunfermline Reign	79–70	City of Edinburgh Kings

15 Nov 2022

Boroughmuir Blaze	75–59	Stirling Knights

Quarter-finals

7 Jan 2023

Ayr Storm	55–80	West Lothian Wolves

1 Dec 2022

Glasgow University	90–57	Pleasance

13 Jan 2023

Falkirk Fury	77–87 (OT)	St Mirren

8 Dec 2022

Dunfermline Reign	64–71	Boroughmuir Blaze

Semi-finals

18 Jan 2023

West Lothian Wolves	91–84	Glasgow University

3 Feb 2023

St Mirren	79–81	Boroughmuir Blaze

Final

11 Feb 2023

Boxscore

West Lothian Wolves	61–111	Boroughmuir Blaze
Scoring by quarter: 17-19, 14-33, 13-31, 17-28
Pts: S. McDonald (13); Rebs: S. McDonald (9); Asts: J. Leighton (4)		Pts: M. McLain (23); Rebs: M. Langsen (11); Asts: M. McLain, L. Sullivan (4)

Regional Performance Centre, Dundee

Preceded by 2021–22 season	SBC seasons 2022–23	Succeeded by 2023–24 season
