= 2000–01 Scottish Men's National League season =

2000–01 SNBL season
- League: Scottish Men's National League
- Sport: Basketball
- Number of teams: 10

Regular Season

SMNL seasons
- ← 1999–00 2001–02 →

The 2000–01 season was the 32nd campaign of the Scottish Men's National League, the national basketball league of Scotland. The season featured 10 teams; there were no changes from the previous season. Clark Erikkson Fury won their first league title with a 100% record.

== Teams ==
Location of teams in 2000–01 Scottish Men's National League

The line-up for the 2000–01 season featured the following teams:

- Aberdeen Buccaneers
- Boroughmuir
- City of Edinburgh Kings
- Clark Erikkson Fury
- Dunfermline Reign
- Glasgow d2
- Midlothian Bulls
- Paisley
- St Mirren McDonalds
- Troon Tornadoes

== League table ==
Pos	Team	Pld	W	L	%	Pts
1	Clark Erikkson Fury	18	18	0	1.000	36
2	City of Edinburgh Kings	18	14	4	0.778	32
3	St Mirren McDonalds	18	12	6	0.667	30
4	Glasgow d2	18	11	7	0.611	29
5	Midlothian Bulls	18	10	8	0.556	28
6	Troon Tornadoes	18	9	9	0.500	26
7	Dunfermline Reign	18	6	12	0.333	24
8	Boroughmuir	18	5	13	0.278	23
9	Aberdeen Buccaneers	18	2	16	0.111	20
10	Paisley	18	2	16	0.111	19

Source: Scottish National League 2000-01 - Britball

Preceded by 1999–00 season	SNBL seasons 2000–01	Succeeded by 2001–02 season
