= 2018–19 Scottish Basketball Championship Men season =

2018–19 SBC Men season
- League: Scottish Basketball Championship
- Sport: Basketball
- Number of teams: 19

Regular Season

SBC Competitions

SBC seasons
- ← 2017–18 2019–20 →

The 2018–19 season was the 50th campaign of the Scottish Basketball Championship, the national basketball league of Scotland. 19 teams were split into Division 1, featuring 10 teams, and Division 2, featuring 9 teams. Dunfermline Reign won their first league title.

== Format ==
In Division 1, each team plays each other twice, once home, once away, for a total of 18 games.

In Division 2, each team plays each other twice, once home, once away, for a total of 16 games.

== Division 1 ==
=== Teams ===
Location of teams in 2018–19 SBC Division 1

Promoted to Division 1

- Edinburgh Lions

Relegated from Division 1

- Pleasance

=== League table ===
Pos	Team	Pld	W	L	GF	GA	GD	Pts	Qualification or relegation
1	Dunfermline Reign (C)	18	17	1	1550	1158	+392	35	Qualification for playoffs
2	Falkirk Fury	18	14	4	1503	1198	+305	32	Qualification for playoffs
3	St Mirren	18	13	5	1747	1400	+347	31	Qualification for playoffs
4	City of Edinburgh Kings	18	12	6	1277	1189	+88	30	Qualification for playoffs
5	Boroughmuir Blaze	18	11	7	1470	1307	+163	29	Qualification for playoffs
6	Glasgow Storm	18	9	9	1262	1272	−10	27	Qualification for playoffs
7	Glasgow University	18	8	10	1251	1350	−99	26	Qualification for playoffs
8	Edinburgh Lions	18	3	15	1146	1525	−379	21	Qualification for playoffs
9	Stirling Knights (R)	18	2	16	1095	1497	−402	20	Relegation Playoff
10	Edinburgh University (R)	18	1	17	993	1398	−405	19	Relegation to Division 2

Source: BasketballScotland
(C) Champions; (R) Relegated

=== Playoffs ===
Quarter-finals

8 Mar 2019

City of Edinburgh Kings	87–70	Boroughmuir Blaze

8 Mar 2019

Falkirk Fury	92–68	Glasgow University

9 Mar 2019

Dunfermline Reign	85–54	Edinburgh Lions

12 Mar 2019

St Mirren	93–85	Glasgow Storm

Semi-finals

15 Mar 2019

Falkirk Fury	94–84	St Mirren

16 Mar 2019

Dunfermline Reign	75–77	City of Edinburgh Kings

Final

30 Mar 2019

City of Edinburgh Kings	74–73	Falkirk Fury

Oriam, Edinburgh

== Division 2 ==
=== Teams ===
Location of teams in 2018–19 SBC Division 2

Promoted to Division 1

- Edinburgh Lions

Relegated from Division 1

- Pleasance

New team

- North Lanarkshire Chiefs

=== League table ===
Pos	Team	Pld	W	L	GF	GA	GD	Pts	Promotion or qualification
1	Ayrshire Tornadoes (C, P)	16	14	2	1385	1014	+371	30	Qualification for playoffs
2	West Lothian Wolves	16	11	5	1151	968	+183	27	Qualification for playoffs
3	Perth Phoenix (P)	16	11	5	1088	938	+150	27	Qualification for playoffs
4	Heriot Watt University	16	9	7	1184	1116	+68	25	Qualification for playoffs
5	Boroughmuir Blaze B	16	9	7	1072	1084	−12	25	
6	Pleasance	16	8	8	1008	1121	−113	24	
7	City of Edinburgh Kings U23s	16	6	10	1036	1168	−132	22	
8	North Lanarkshire Chiefs	16	3	13	875	1108	−233	19	
9	Glasgow University B	16	1	15	874	1156	−282	17	

Updated to match(es) played on 24 April 2019. Source: BasketballScotland
(C) Champions; (P) Promoted

=== Playoffs ===
Semi-finals

16 Mar 2019

Ayrshire Tornadoes	90–89	Heriot Watt University

17 Mar 2019

West Lothian Wolves	78–79	Perth Phoenix

Final

23 Mar 2019

Ayrshire Tornadoes	82–74	Perth Phoenix

St Columba's RC High School, Dunfermline

=== Promotion playoff ===
10 Jun 2019

Stirling Knights	62–72	Perth Phoenix

== Scottish Cup ==
Scottish Cup (basketball)

1st Round

31 Aug 2018

Ayrshire Tornadoes	91–67	Perth Phoenix

15 Sep 2018

Pleasance	56–59	Portlethen Panthers

2nd Round

29 Sep 2018

Ayrshire Tornadoes	88–49	Highland Bears

29 Sep 2018

City of Edinburgh Kings	91–59	Portlethen Panthers

29 Sep 2018

Glasgow University	75–79	Boroughmuir Blaze

28 Sep 2018

St Mirren	106–62	Edinburgh Lions

29 Sep 2018

Edinburgh University	53–79	Dunfermline Reign

Granite City Grizzlies	c–w	West Lothian Wolves

29 Sep 2018

Stirling Knights	77–71	Glasgow Storm

30 Sep 2018

Heriot Watt University	74–114	Falkirk Fury

Quarter-finals

3 Nov 2018

Ayrshire Tornadoes	95–76	City of Edinburgh Kings

6 Nov 2018

Boroughmuir Blaze	77–80	St Mirren

3 Nov 2018

Dunfermline Reign	97–90	West Lothian Wolves

2 Nov 2018

Stirling Knights	60–79	Falkirk Fury

Semi-finals

5 Dec 2018

Ayrshire Tornadoes	81–134	St Mirren

8 Dec 2018

Dunfermline Reign	72–87	Falkirk Fury

Final

2 Feb 2019
17:45

St Mirren	78–100	Falkirk Fury

Oriam, Edinburgh

Preceded by 2017–18 season	SBC seasons 2018–19	Succeeded by 2019–20 season
