= 2011–12 Scottish Men's National League season =

2011–12 SNBL season
- League: Scottish Men's National League
- Sport: Basketball
- Number of teams: 10

Regular Season

SNBL Competitions

SNBL seasons
- ← 2010–11 2012–13 →

The 2011–12 season was the 43rd campaign of the Scottish Men's National League, the national basketball league of Scotland. The season featured 10 teams. East Lothian Peregrines dropped out of the league and were replaced by Boroughmuir Blaze, who rejoined the league. City of Edinburgh Kings won their 9th league title.

== Teams ==
Location of teams in 2011–12 Scottish Men's National League

The line-up for the 2011-2012 season features the following teams:

- Boroughmuir Blaze
- City of Edinburgh Kings
- Clark Eriksson Fury
- Dunfermline Reign
- Glasgow Rocks II
- Glasgow Storm
- Glasgow University
- St Mirren Reid Kerr College
- Stirling Knights
- Troon Tornadoes

== League table ==
Pos	Team	Pld	W	L	PF	PA	PD	Pts	Qualification
1	City of Edinburgh Kings	18	17	1	1546	1006	+540	35	Qualification to playoffs
2	Clark Eriksson Fury	18	16	2	1442	1097	+345	34	Qualification to playoffs
3	St Mirren Reid Kerr College	18	14	4	1506	1212	+294	32	Qualification to playoffs
4	Troon Tornadoes	18	10	8	1303	1198	+105	28	Qualification to playoffs
5	Glasgow University	18	9	9	1288	1296	–8	27	Qualification to playoffs
6	Stirling Knights	18	7	11	1163	1328	–165	25	Qualification to playoffs
7	Boroughmuir Blaze	18	7	11	1132	1261	–129	25	Qualification to playoffs
8	Glasgow Storm	18	7	11	1077	1297	–220	25	Qualification to playoffs
9	Glasgow Rocks II	18	2	16	1160	1484	–324	20	
10	Dunfermline Reign	18	1	17	1090	1528	–438	19	

== Playoffs ==
=== Quarter-finals ===
City of Edinburgh Kings	66–49	Glasgow Storm

Glasgow Storm	44–79	City of Edinburgh Kings

Glasgow University	86–81	Troon Tornadoes

Troon Tornadoes	52–59	Glasgow University

Boroughmuir Blaze	76–96	Falkirk Fury

Falkirk Fury	83–71	Boroughmuir Blaze

Stirling Knights	C–W	St Mirren Reid Kerr College

St Mirren Reid Kerr College	W–C	Stirling Knights

=== Semi-finals ===
Glasgow University	70–74	City of Edinburgh Kings

City of Edinburgh Kings	95–50	Glasgow University

St Mirren Reid Kerr College	80–91	Falkirk Fury

Falkirk Fury	79–83	St Mirren Reid Kerr College

=== Final ===
City of Edinburgh Kings	89–69	Falkirk Fury

Preceded by 2010–11 season	SNBL seasons 2011–12	Succeeded by 2012–13 season
