= 2012–13 Scottish Men's National League season =

2012–13 SNBL season
- League: Scottish Men's National League
- Sport: Basketball
- Number of teams: 10

Regular Season

SNBL Competitions

SNBL seasons
- ← 2011–12 2013–14 →

The 2012–13 season was the 44th campaign of the Scottish Men's National League. The season featured 10 teams from across Scotland. Falkirk Fury won their 2nd league title.

== Teams ==
Location of teams in 2012–13 Scottish Men's National League

The line-up for the 2012-2013 season features the following teams:

- Boroughmuir Blaze
- City of Edinburgh Kings
- Clark Eriksson Fury
- Dunfermline Reign
- Glasgow Rocks II
- Glasgow Storm
- Glasgow University
- St Mirren Reid Kerr College
- Stirling Knights
- Troon Tornadoes

== League table ==
| Pos | Team | Pld | W | L | GF | GA | GD | Pts | Qualification |
|---|---|---|---|---|---|---|---|---|---|
| 1 | Falkirk Fury (C) | 18 | 17 | 1 | 1474 | 1103 | +371 | 35 | Qualification to playoffs |
| 2 | City of Edinburgh Kings | 18 | 16 | 2 | 1582 | 1081 | +501 | 34 | Qualification to playoffs |
| 3 | Glasgow University | 18 | 12 | 6 | 1385 | 1290 | +95 | 30 | Qualification to playoffs |
| 4 | Troon Tornadoes | 18 | 11 | 7 | 1263 | 1262 | +1 | 29 | Qualification to playoffs |
| 5 | St Mirren Reid Kerr College | 18 | 11 | 7 | 1557 | 1313 | +244 | 29 | Qualification to playoffs |
| 6 | Boroughmuir Blaze | 18 | 8 | 10 | 1215 | 1247 | −32 | 26 | Qualification to playoffs |
| 7 | Stirling Knights | 18 | 5 | 13 | 1187 | 1413 | −226 | 23 | Qualification to playoffs |
| 8 | Glasgow Rocks II | 18 | 5 | 13 | 1233 | 1460 | −227 | 23 | Qualification to playoffs |
| 9 | Dunfermline Reign | 18 | 3 | 15 | 1149 | 1560 | −411 | 21 | |
| 10 | Glasgow Storm | 18 | 2 | 16 | 1090 | 1406 | −316 | 20 | |

Source: snblLeagueRepublic
(C) Champions

== Playoffs ==
=== Quarter-finals ===
| Falkirk Fury | 72–67 | Glasgow Rocks II |

| Glasgow Rocks II | 65–91 | Falkirk Fury |
Falkirk win 163-132

| St Mirren Reid Kerr College | 70–69 | Troon Tornadoes |

| Troon Tornadoes | 89–87 | St Mirren Reid Kerr College |
Troon win 158-157

| Boroughmuir Blaze | 73–73 | Glasgow University |

| Glasgow University | 77–70 | Boroughmuir Blaze |
Glasgow win 147-143

| Stirling Knights | 53–87 | City of Edinburgh Kings |

| City of Edinburgh Kings | 78–50 | Stirling Knights |
Edinburgh win 165-103

=== Semi-finals ===
| Falkirk Fury | 66–39 | Troon Tornadoes |

| Troon Tornadoes | 46–76 | Falkirk Fury |
Falkirk win 142-82

| Glasgow University | 54–81 | City of Edinburgh Kings |

| City of Edinburgh Kings | 92–53 | Glasgow University |
Edinburgh win 173-107

=== Final ===
| Falkirk Fury | 66–68 | City of Edinburgh Kings |

| Preceded by 2011–12 season | SNBL seasons 2012–13 | Succeeded by 2013–14 season |
