= 2009–10 Scottish Men's National League season =

2009–10 SNBL season
- League: Scottish Men's National League
- Sport: Basketball
- Number of teams: 6

Regular Season

SNBL Competitions

SNBL seasons
- ← 2008–09 2010–11 →

The 2009–10 season was the 41st campaign of the Scottish Men's National League, the national basketball league of Scotland. The season featured 6 teams. There were no end-of-season playoffs. City of Edinburgh Kings won their 7th league title.

== Teams ==
Location of teams in 2009–10 Scottish Men's National League

The line-up for the 2009-2010 season featured the following teams:

- City of Edinburgh Kings
- Clark Eriksson Fury
- East Lothian Peregrines
- Glasgow Storm
- St Mirren Reid Kerr College
- Troon Tornadoes

== League table ==
Pos	Team	Pld	W	L	GF	GA	GD	Pts	
1	City of Edinburgh Kings (C)	20	18	2	1571	1177	+394	38	League Champions
2	Falkirk Fury	20	14	6	1463	1341	+122	34	
3	St Mirren Reid Kerr College	20	13	7	1494	1439	+55	33	
4	Troon Tornadoes	20	10	10	1404	1384	+20	30	
5	Glasgow Storm	20	3	17	1091	1447	−356	23	
6	East Lothian Peregrines	20	2	18	1157	1392	−235	22	

Source: Scottish National League 2009-10 - Eurobasket
(C) Champions

Preceded by 2008–09 season	SNBL seasons 2009–10	Succeeded by 2010–11 season
