= 2021–22 Scottish Basketball Championship Men season =

2021–22 SBC Men season
- League: Scottish Basketball Championship
- Sport: Basketball
- Number of teams: 15

SBC Competitions
- Division 1 champions: St Mirren (3rd title)
- Scottish Cup champions: Falkirk Fury (6th title)
- SBC Playoffs champions: St Mirren (1st title)

SBC seasons
- ← 2019–20 2022–23 →

The 2021–22 season was the 52nd campaign of the Scottish Basketball Championship, the national basketball league of Scotland. There was no 2020–21 season due to the global coronavirus pandemic. 15 teams were split across Division 1, featuring 9 teams, and Division 2, featuring 6 teams.

== Division 1 ==
=== Teams ===
Location of teams in 2021–22 SBC Division 1

Promoted from 2019-20 Division 2

- Stirling Knights
- West Lothian Wolves

=== League table ===
Pos	Team	Pld	W	L	GF	GA	GD	Pts	Qualification or relegation
1	St Mirren (C)	16	14	2	1393	1103	+290	30	Qualification to playoffs
2	Falkirk Fury	16	13	3	1268	1032	+236	29	Qualification to playoffs
3	City of Edinburgh Kings	16	13	3	1296	1150	+146	29	Qualification to playoffs
4	Boroughmuir Blaze	16	11	5	1269	1059	+210	27	Qualification to playoffs
5	Stirling Knights	16	7	9	1091	1178	−87	23	
6	Glasgow University	16	6	10	1169	1211	−42	22	
7	Dunfermline Reign	16	5	11	1161	1225	−64	21	
8	Edinburgh Lions	16	1	15	976	1360	−384	17	
9	West Lothian Wolves	16	2	14	1010	1315	−305	17	

Source: BasketballScotland
(C) Champions

*West Lothian Wolves deducted 1 point due to failure to fulfil fixture vs. Falkirk Fury on 02 April 2022.

=== Playoffs ===
Semi-finals

26 Apr 2022

City of Edinburgh Kings	83–82	Falkirk Fury

29 Apr 2022

Falkirk Fury	79–66	City of Edinburgh Kings
Falkirk win 161-149 on aggregate

26 Apr 2022

Boroughmuir Blaze	73–87	St Mirren

29 Apr 2022

St Mirren	88–63	Boroughmuir Blaze
St Mirren win 175-136 on aggregate

Final

6 May 2022

St Mirren	96–73	Falkirk Fury

8 May 2022

Falkirk Fury	69–58	St Mirren
St Mirren win 154-142 on aggregate

== Division 2 ==
=== Teams ===
Location of teams in 2021–22 SBC Division 2

New teams

- Ayr Storm
- Dundee Madsons
- Renfrew Rocks
- Tayside Musketeers

=== League table ===
Pos	Team	Pld	W	L	GF	GA	GD	Pts	Promotion or qualification
1	Renfrew Rocks (C)	10	10	0	894	571	+323	20	Promotion to Division 1
2	North Lanarkshire Chiefs (P)	10	7	3	772	701	+71	17	Promotion to Division 1
3	Tayside Musketeers	10	6	4	801	658	+143	16	
4	Dundee Madsons	10	5	5	738	610	+128	15	
5	Pleasance	10	1	9	520	743	−223	10	
6	Ayr Storm	10	0	10	495	937	−442	9	

Source: BasketballScotland
(C) Champions; (P) Promoted

== Scottish Cup ==
Scottish Cup (basketball)

First Round

8 Oct 2021

Boroughmuir Blaze	82–52	Dundee Madsons

15 Oct 2021

North Lanarkshire Chiefs	64–87	Stirling Knights

16 Oct 2021

Edinburgh Lions	47–78	Renfrew Rocks

17 Oct 2021

Perth Phoenix	46–78	Banchory Stags

Second Round

19 Nov 2021

West Lothian Wolves	51–73	Falkirk Fury

20 Nov 2021

City of Edinburgh Kings	97–53	Leith Honeybadgers

21 Nov 2021

Lockerbie Tornadoes	55–39	Banchory Stags

21 Nov 2021

St Mirren	100–56	Stirling Knights

21 Nov 2021

Portlethen Panthers	57–94	Boroughmuir Blaze

22 Nov 2021

Pleasance	37–79	Renfrew Rocks

Quarter-finals

3 Dec 2021

City of Edinburgh Kings	82–90	St Mirren

7 Dec 2021

Renfrew Rocks	79–62	Boroughmuir Blaze

8 Mar 2022

Lockerbie Tornadoes	59–85	Dunfermline Reign

20 Feb 2022

Falkirk Fury	92–44	Glasgow University

Semi-finals

26 Mar 2022

Dunfermline Reign	73–68	Renfrew Rocks

21 Apr 2022

St Mirren	70–71	Falkirk Fury

Final

23 Apr 2022
16:00

Dunfermline Reign	63–68	Falkirk Fury

Regional Performance Centre, Dundee

Preceded by 2019–20 season	SBC seasons 2021–22	Succeeded by 2022–23 season
