= 2017–18 Scottish Basketball Championship Men season =

2017–18 SBC Men season
- League: Scottish Basketball Championship
- Sport: Basketball
- Number of teams: 18

Regular Season

SBC Competitions

SBC seasons
- ← 2016–17 2018–19 →

The 2017–18 season was the 49th campaign of the Scottish Basketball Championship, the national basketball league of Scotland. 18 teams were split into Division 1, featuring 10 teams, and Division 2, featuring 8 teams. St Mirren won their 2nd league title.

== Teams ==
Location of teams in 2017–18 SBC Division 1
Location of teams in 2017–18 SBC Division 2

The line-up for the 2017-18 season features the following teams:

=== Division 1 ===
- Boroughmuir Blaze
- City of Edinburgh Kings
- Dunfermline Reign
- Edinburgh University
- Sony Centre Fury
- Glasgow Storm
- Glasgow University
- Pleasance
- Stirling Knights
- St Mirren West College Scotland

=== Division 2 ===
- Ayrshire Tornadoes
- Boroughmuir Blaze B
- City of Edinburgh Kings B
- Edinburgh Lions
- Glasgow University B
- Heriot Watt University
- Perth Phoenix
- West Lothian Wolves

== Format ==
In Division 1, each team plays each other twice, once home, once away, for a total of 18 games.

In Division 2, each team plays each other twice, once home, once away, for a total of 14 games.

== Division 1 ==
=== League table ===
Pos	Team	Pld	W	L	GF	GA	GD	Pts	Qualification or relegation
1	St Mirren WCS (C)	18	16	2	1677	1255	+422	34	Qualification to playoffs
2	City of Edinburgh Kings	18	14	4	1362	1195	+167	32	Qualification to playoffs
3	Sony Centre Falkirk Fury	18	13	5	1512	1275	+237	31	Qualification to playoffs
4	Boroughmuir Blaze	18	13	5	1427	1248	+179	31	Qualification to playoffs
5	Dunfermline Reign	18	12	6	1583	1466	+117	30	Qualification to playoffs
6	Glasgow Storm	18	5	13	1081	1339	−258	23	Qualification to playoffs
7	Stirling Knights	18	5	13	1279	1435	−156	23	Qualification to playoffs
8	Glasgow University	18	4	14	1016	1224	−208	22	Qualification to playoffs
9	Edinburgh University	18	5	13	1169	1246	−77	22	
10	Pleasance (R)	18	3	15	1100	1533	−433	21	Relegation to Division 2

Source: BasketballScotland
(C) Champions; (R) Relegated
- Edinburgh University received a 1 point deduction for conceding their match against Glasgow University.

=== Playoffs ===
Quarter-finals

9 Mar 2018

St Mirren	80–72	Glasgow University

9 Mar 2018

City of Edinburgh Kings	94–72	Stirling Knights

9 Mar 2018

Falkirk Fury	100–61	Glasgow Storm

9 Mar 2018

Dunfermline Reign	68–77	Boroughmuir Blaze

Semi-finals

16 Mar 2018

St Mirren	71–55	Boroughmuir Blaze

16 Mar 2018

City of Edinburgh Kings	70–68	Falkirk Fury

Final

24 Mar 2018

St Mirren	66–72	City of Edinburgh Kings

Oriam, Edinburgh

== Division 2 ==
=== League table ===
Pos	Team	Pld	W	L	GF	GA	GD	Pts	Promotion or relegation
1	Boroughmuir Blaze B (C)	14	10	4	1054	951	+103	24	Qualification to playoffs
2	Edinburgh Lions (P)	14	10	4	1013	901	+112	24	Qualification to playoffs
3	West Lothian Wolves	14	9	5	881	801	+80	23	Qualification to playoffs
4	Perth Phoenix	14	9	5	1045	983	+62	23	Qualification to playoffs
5	Ayrshire Tornadoes	14	9	5	1031	863	+168	23	
6	Glasgow University B	14	4	10	859	900	−41	18	
7	Heriot Watt University	14	4	10	848	957	−109	18	
8	City of Edinburgh Kings B	14	1	13	815	1190	−375	15	

Source: BasketballScotland
(C) Champions; (P) Promoted

=== Playoffs ===
Semi-finals

7 Mar 2018

Perth Phoenix	68–72	Boroughmuir Blaze B

11 Mar 2018

Edinburgh Lions	56–49	West Lothian Wolves

Final

17 Mar 2018

Boroughmuir Blaze B	62–65	Edinburgh Lions

Oriam, Edinburgh

== Scottish Cup ==
Scottish Cup (basketball)

1st Round

6 Sep 2017

Edinburgh Lions	54–43	West Lothian Wolves

2nd Round

30 Sep 2017

Glasgow Storm	74–48	Edinburgh Lions

30 Sep 2017

Dunfermline Reign	91–96	Falkirk Fury

30 Sep 2017

Glasgow University	53–92	St Mirren

1 Oct 2017

Ayrshire Tornadoes	65–90	City of Edinburgh Kings

30 Sep 2017

Boroughmuir Blaze	83–56	Heriot Watt University

30 Sep 2017

Highland Bears	69–78	Stirling Knights

1 Oct 2017

Portlethen Panthers	63–80	Pleasance

30 Sept 2017

Edinburgh University	92–36	East Warriors Aberdeen

Quarter-finals

4 Nov 2017

Glasgow Storm	44–75	Falkirk Fury

31 Oct 2017

St Mirren	83–92	City of Edinburgh Kings

3 Nov 2017

Boroughmuir Blaze	93–56	Stirling Knights

6 Nov 2017

Pleasance	67–62	Edinburgh University

Semi-finals

1 Dec 2017

Falkirk Fury	63–64	City of Edinburgh Kings

1 Dec 2017

Boroughmuir Blaze	92–64	Pleasance

Final

27 Jan 2018

City of Edinburgh Kings	67–54	Boroughmuir Blaze

Oriam, Edinburgh

The City of Edinburgh Kings won the Scottish Cup after beating the Boroughmuir Blaze in the final.

Preceded by 2016–17 season	SBC seasons 2017–18	Succeeded by 2018–19 season
