= 2013–14 Scottish Men's National League season =

2013–14 SNBL season
- League: Scottish Men's National League
- Sport: Basketball
- Number of teams: 10

Regular Season

SNBL Competitions

SNBL seasons
- ← 2012–13 2014–15 →

The 2013–14 season was the 45th campaign of the Scottish Men's National League, the national basketball league of Scotland. The season featured 10 teams. The season started on 6 September 2013 and ended with the Play-off Final on 6 April 2014. Falkirk Fury won their 3rd league title.

== Teams ==
Location of teams in 2013–14 Scottish Men's National League

The line-up for the 2013–2014 season features the following teams:

- Boroughmuir Blaze
- City of Edinburgh Kings
- Clark Eriksson Fury
- Dunfermline Reign
- Glasgow Rocks II
- Glasgow Storm
- Glasgow University
- St Mirren West College Scotland
- Stirling Knights
- Troon Tornadoes

== League table ==
Pos	Team	Pld	W	L	GF	GA	GD	Pts	Qualification
1	Falkirk Fury (C)	18	18	0	1465	1029	+436	36	Qualification for playoffs
2	St Mirren West College Scotland	18	15	3	1690	1296	+394	33	Qualification for playoffs
3	City of Edinburgh Kings	18	13	5	1294	1057	+237	31	Qualification for playoffs
4	Boroughmuir Blaze	18	10	8	1385	1284	+101	28	Qualification for playoffs
5	Glasgow University	18	10	8	1331	1259	+72	28	Qualification for playoffs
6	Troon Tornadoes	18	8	10	1232	1315	−83	26	Qualification for playoffs
7	Glasgow Rocks II	18	7	11	1380	1397	−17	25	Qualification for playoffs
8	Glasgow Storm	18	6	12	1185	1332	−147	24	Qualification for playoffs
9	Stirling Knights	18	2	16	1187	1572	−385	20	
10	Dunfermline Reign	18	1	17	1025	1633	−608	19	

Source: snblLeagueRepublic
(C) Champions

== Playoffs ==
=== Quarter-finals ===
20 March 2014

Glasgow Storm	72–104	Falkirk Fury

21 March 2014

Falkirk Fury	100–57	Glasgow Storm
Falkirk win 204-129

21 March 2014

St Mirren West College Scotland	90–79	Glasgow Rocks II

22 March 2014

Glasgow Rocks II	97–91	St Mirren West College Scotland
St Mirren win 181-176

22 March 2014

Troon Tornadoes	49–65	City of Edinburgh Kings

23 March 2014

City of Edinburgh Kings	71–60	Troon Tornadoes
Edinburgh win 136-109

21 March 2014

Glasgow University	73–73	Boroughmuir Blaze

23 March 2014

Boroughmuir Blaze	63–83	Glasgow University
Glasgow win 156-136

=== Semi-finals ===
4 April 2014

Falkirk Fury	64–72	Glasgow University

4 April 2014

City of Edinburgh Kings	68–73	St Mirren West College Scotland

=== Final ===
6 April 2014

Glasgow University	90–79	St Mirren West College Scotland

Pleasance Sports Centre, Edinburgh

Preceded by 2012–13 season	SNBL seasons 2013–14	Succeeded by 2014–15 season
