= 2019–20 Scottish Basketball Championship Men season =

2019–20 SBC Men season
- League: Scottish Basketball Championship
- Sport: Basketball
- Number of teams: 19

SBC Competitions

SBC seasons
- ← 2018–19 2021–22 →

The 2019–20 season was the 51st campaign of the Scottish Basketball Championship, the national basketball league of Scotland. 20 teams were split across Division 1, featuring 10 teams, and Division 2, featuring 10 teams. Glasgow Storm withdrew at the start of the season, leaving Division 1 with 9 teams. Falkirk Fury won their sixth league title.

== Format ==
In Division 1, each team plays each other twice, once home, once away, for a total of 16 games.

In Division 2, each team plays each other twice, once home, once away, for a total of 18 games.

== Division 1 ==
=== Teams ===
Location of teams in 2019–20 SBC Division 1

Promoted from 2018 to 2019 Division 2

- Ayrshire Tornadoes
- Perth Phoenix

Relegated from 2018 to 2019 Division 1

- Stirling Knights

Withdrawn (at end of 2018–19)

- Edinburgh University

=== League table ===
Pos	Team	Pld	W	L	GF	GA	GD	Pts	Qualification or relegation
1	Falkirk Fury (C)	16	14	2	1460	1112	+348	30	Qualification to playoffs
2	St Mirren	16	13	3	1409	1200	+209	29	Qualification to playoffs
3	Dunfermline Reign	16	12	4	1294	1200	+94	28	Qualification to playoffs
4	Boroughmuir Blaze	16	10	6	1285	1045	+240	26	Qualification to playoffs
5	City of Edinburgh Kings	16	9	7	1266	1181	+85	25	Qualification to playoffs
6	Perth Phoenix	16	6	10	940	1237	−297	22	Qualification to playoffs
7	Glasgow University	16	5	11	1099	1176	−77	21	Qualification to playoffs
8	Edinburgh Lions	16	2	14	1037	1235	−198	18	Qualification to playoffs
9	Ayrshire Tornadoes (Note: Ayrshire Tornadoes deducted one point for failing to fulfil fixture vs Perth Phoenix)	16	1	15	939	1343	−404	16	Relegation Playoff
10	Glasgow Storm	0	0	0	0	0	0	0	Withdrew from League

Source: BasketballScotland
(C) Champions

=== Playoffs ===
The draw for the Playoffs was complete on Sunday 1 March 2020. It was announced that the Playoff Final would be played on 28 March 2020 at the Regional Performance Centre in Dundee. The season was then suspended on 13 March 2020 due to the COVID-19 pandemic, prior to the completion of the semi-final stage.

Quarter-finals

6 Mar 2020

Falkirk Fury	116–91	Edinburgh Lions

6 Mar 2020

St Mirren	82–72	Glasgow University

6 Mar 2020

Boroughmuir Blaze	77–82	City of Edinburgh Kings

7 Mar 2020

Dunfermline Reign	93–74	Perth Phoenix

Semi-finals

13 Mar 2020

Falkirk Fury	X–X	City of Edinburgh Kings

13 Mar 2020

St Mirren	X–X	Dunfermline Reign

== Division 2 ==
=== Teams ===
Location of teams in 2019–20 SBC Division 2

Promoted to 2019-20 Division 1

- Ayrshire Tornadoes
- Perth Phoenix

Relegated from 2018 to 2019 Division 1

- Stirling Knights

New Teams

- Glasgow City from Strathclyde League
- Inverness Lions from Highland League

=== League table ===
Pos	Team	Pld	W	L	GF	GA	GD	Pts	Promotion or qualification
1	Stirling Knights (C, P)	18	16	2	1345	1074	+271	34	Qualification to playoffs
2	City of Edinburgh Kings B	18	15	3	1364	1071	+293	33	Qualification to playoffs
3	West Lothian Wolves (P)	18	13	5	1482	1215	+267	31	Qualification to playoffs
4	Inverness Lions	18	13	5	1337	1202	+135	31	Qualification to playoffs
5	Boroughmuir Blaze B	18	11	7	1269	1071	+198	29	
6	Pleasance	18	6	12	1073	1308	−235	24	
7	Heriot-Watt University (Note: Heriot-Watt University deducted one point for failing to fulfil fixture vs Stirling Knights)	18	6	12	934	1090	−156	23	
8	Glasgow University B	18	5	13	1146	1269	−123	23	
9	North Lanarkshire Chiefs	18	4	14	1119	1269	−150	22	
10	Glasgow City	18	1	17	904	1404	−500	19	

Source: BasketballScotland
(C) Champions; (P) Promoted

=== Playoffs ===
Semi-finals

14 Mar 2020

Stirling Knights	X–X	Inverness Lions

14 Mar 2020

City of Edinburgh Kings B	X–X	West Lothian Wolves

== Scottish Cup ==
Scottish Cup (basketball)

The draw for the 74th Scottish Cup was made on Friday 26 July 2019. All 16 teams entered at the first round stage; overall the number of teams competing was down 4 on the previous year. The defending champions were the Falkirk Fury. The final was played on 1 February 2020 at the Lagoon Leisure Centre, Paisley.

Round of 16

5 Oct 2019

Ayrshire Tornadoes	75–78	Perth Phoenix

5 Oct 2019

Dunfermline Reign	125–49	Highland Bears

5 Oct 2019

Edinburgh Lions	98–54	Pleasance

5 Oct 2019

Boroughmuir Blaze	81–78	Falkirk Fury

6 Oct 2019

Edinburgh University	38–68	Glasgow University

4 Oct 2019

St Mirren	116–43	Heriot-Watt University

4 Oct 2019

Stirling Knights	97–91	West Lothian Wolves

Glasgow Storm	c–W	City of Edinburgh Kings

Quarter-finals

11 Nov 2019

Perth Phoenix	69–81	Dunfermline Reign

9 Nov 2019

Edinburgh Lions	57–82	Boroughmuir Blaze

9 Nov 2019

Glasgow University	68–89	St Mirren

9 Nov 2019

Stirling Knights	62–82	City of Edinburgh Kings

Semi-finals

5 Dec 2019

Dunfermline Reign	70–82	Boroughmuir Blaze

6 Dec 2019

St Mirren	101–86	City of Edinburgh Kings

Final

1 Feb 2020

Report

Boroughmuir Blaze	78–72	St Mirren

Lagoon Leisure Centre, Paisley

Preceded by 2018–19 season	SBC seasons 2019–20	Succeeded by 2020–21 season
