= Brian McCotter =

Irish basketball player

Brian McCotter (born 1984 in Belfast, Northern Ireland) is a former Irish professional basketball player.

Brian is a product of St. Malachy's College basketball team and was named MVP in the All Ireland U19 Schools Final after hitting 29 points. Brian was also named Irish Senior Schoolboy player of the year in 2002 and has represented Ireland at Junior Men's level. Brian started his club career with Star of the Sea Basketball Club in Belfast.

The 6 feet (1.8 m) guard Glasgow Caledonian University where he captained the Scotland Universities side, while also playing for Scottish Basketball League side Troon Tornadoes from 2004 to 2006 winning the Scottish National League title and two Scottish National Cups and being named to the West All Star Team in 2005.

Brian has been described as a ball handler with speed around the court and as a shooter. His performance led Newcastle Eagles coach Fabulous Flournoy to sign him during the summer of 2006. While at the Eagles, Brian won the BBL Championship twice, the BBL League twice, and the BBL Trophy once.

Brian also played for the Teesside Mohawks, Northumbria University and Newcastle Knights.
