= Inverness Lions B.C. =

Inverness Lions
- League: SBC Division 2
- Established: 2014; 12 years ago
- Arena: Inverness Royal Academy, Inverness Leisure & Millburn Academy
- Location: Inverness, Scotland
- Team colours
- Website: Official website

The Inverness Lions are a Scottish basketball club, based in the city of Inverness, Scotland.

== Club ==
Inverness City B.C. was established as a youth focused club, with training and games for kids aged 6 to 18. In its short history the club has developed over 20 players who have gone on to represent Scotland and GB at age-grade international level.

As the club grew, a senior team was added, providing a full pathway to progress through the Club. The Lions name was then adopted, and in 2015, the club became part of the Inverness Community Sport Hub.

In 2019, the Lions' men's team entered the Scottish Men's National League for the first time. They are the first senior men's team from the Highlands to play at this level.

== Teams ==
For the 2019-20 season, the Lions will field the following teams:

Senior Men - National League Division 2
Senior Men II - Highland League

U18 Men - National League U18 Division 1
U18 Women - National League U18 Division 1

U16 Boys - National League U16 Division 1
U16 Girls - National League U16 Division 1

== Home Venue ==
The Lions are based at various venues in the city, including Inverness Royal Academy Inverness Leisure and Millburn Academy.

== Men's season-by-season records ==
Season	Division	Tier	Regular Season						Post-Season	Scottish Cup
Season	Division	Tier	Finish	Played	Wins	Losses	Points	Win %	Post-Season	Scottish Cup
Inverness Lions
2019–20	SBC D2	3	4th	18	13	5	31	0.722	No playoffs	Did not compete
