= Edinburgh Lions B.C. =

- League: SBC Division 2
- Established: 2006; 20 years ago
- History: Edinburgh Lions; 2006-present
- Arena: Broughton High School
- Location: Edinburgh, Scotland
- Team colours
- President: Aris Tyrothoulakis
- Head coach: Achilleas Chatzitheocharis
- Website: Official website

The Edinburgh Lions are a basketball club based in the city of Edinburgh, Scotland. The Men's team compete in the 2nd Division of the Scottish Basketball Championship, the second highest level in Scotland and third tier of British basketball. The Lions also have two more Men's teams and a Women's team, which all compete in the Lothian Basketball League.

== Men ==
The Men's Lions team play in Division 2 of the Scottish Basketball Championship. The team was promoted to National League Division 1 at the start of the 2018–19 season, after winning the 2017–18 Division 2 Playoff title and many successful years in the regional Lothian Basketball League, which they won in the 2011–12 season. After 4 seasons in the top-tier basketball league in Scotland, the team got relegated to National League Division 2 after finishing 9th at the end of the 2022-23 season, when Basketball Scotland decided to reduce the number of teams in the 1st Division to 8.

=== Honours ===
National League Division 2 Winners: 2018, 2024
Lothian League Winners: 2012

=== Season-by-season records ===
Season	Division	Tier	Regular Season						Post-Season	Scottish Cup
Season	Division	Tier	Finish	Played	Wins	Losses	Points	Win %	Post-Season	Scottish Cup
Edinburgh Lions
2011-12	Lothian Div 1	4	1st	18	17	1	52	0.944		
2012-13	Lothian Div 1	4	2nd	20	17	3	54	0.850		
2013-14	Lothian Div 1	4	4th	20	11	9	42	0.550		
2014-15	Lothian Div 1	4	4th	20	13	7	46	0.650		
2015-16	Lothian Div 1	4	2nd	10	7	3	24	0.700		
2016-17	SBC Div 2	3	3rd	14	9	5	23	0.643	Runners Up	Did not compete
2017-18	SBC Div 2	3	2nd	14	10	4	24	0.714	Winners	1st round
2018-19	SBC Div 1	2	8th	18	3	15	21	0.167	Quarter-finals	1st round
2019-20	SBC Div 1	2	8th	16	2	14	18	0.125	Quarter-finals	Quarter-finals
2021-22	SBC Div 1	2	8th	16	1	15	17	0.063	Did not qualify	1st round
2022-23	SBC Div 1	2	9th	20	4	16	24	0.200	Did not qualify	1st round
2023-24	SBC Div 2	3	1st	17	16	1	32	0.941		Semi-finals

=== 2023–24 Men's team Roster ===
Edinburgh Lions roster
Players
Coaches

Pos.	No.	Nat.	Name	Ht.
G		(Spain)	Perez, Osama	6 ft 0 in (1.83 m)
C		(Greece)	Chalkidis, Notis	6 ft 8 in (2.03 m)
G		(Lithuania)	Kazakevičius, Eimantas	6 ft 2 in (1.88 m)
F		(Sweden)	Vogel, Julian	6 ft 4 in (1.93 m)
F		(Spain)	Mendoza Muñoz, Alejandro	6 ft 4 in (1.93 m)
G		(England)	Norton, Dominic	6 ft 0 in (1.83 m)
G		(United States)	Desimone, Sean	5 ft 10 in (1.78 m)
G		(Italy)	Rossi, Niccolo	5 ft 10 in (1.78 m)
C		(United States)	Bryant, Jordan	6 ft 6 in (1.98 m)
G		(Australia)	Polonsky, Jon	6 ft 3 in (1.91 m)
F		(France)	Ramillien, Rudy	6 ft 0 in (1.83 m)
F		(New Zealand)	Glynn, Tom	6 ft 4 in (1.93 m)
G		(Scotland)	Marshall, Scott	6 ft 2 in (1.88 m)
C		(Spain)	Hernandez Macias, Angel	6 ft 3 in (1.91 m)
G		(Scotland)	Firoozi, Michael	5 ft 9 in (1.75 m)

Head coach

- (Greece) Achilleas Chatzitheocharis

Legend

- (C) Team captain
- Injured

== Women ==
After several years of being one of the top teams in the Lothian League and three seasons of sweeping all regional titles, the Lions Women's team also moved on to participate in the Scottish Basketball Championship for the first time in the 2022-23 season. Despite a successful first season in the National League, the team made the decision to return to the Lothian League the following year.

=== Honours ===
Lothian League Winners: 2016, 2019, 2020, 2022, 2024
Lothian Cup Winners: 2019, 2022

=== Season-by-season records ===
Season	Division	Tier	Regular Season						Lothian Cup	Scottish Cup	Post-Season
Season	Division	Tier	Finish	Played	Wins	Losses	Points	Win %	Lothian Cup	Scottish Cup	Post-Season
Edinburgh Lions
2011-12	Lothian League	3	9th	18	4	14	25	0.222			
2012-13	Lothian League	3	7th	20	7	13	34	0.350			
2013-14	Lothian League	3	3rd	20	14	6	48	0.700			
2014-15	Lothian League	3	4th	16	9	7	34	0.563			
2015-16	Lothian League	3	1st	12	11	1	34	0.917			
2016-17	Lothian League	3	3rd	14	6	8	26	0.429			
2017-18	Lothian League	3	2nd	8	5	3	18	0.625			
2018-19	Lothian League	3	1st	8	6	2	20	0.750	Winners		
2019-20	Lothian League	3	1st	9	8	1	25	0.889	Cancelled		
2021-22	Lothian League	3	1st	10	10	0	30	1.000	Winners	Quarter-finals	
2022-23	SBC	2	7th							1st round	
2023-24	Lothian League	3	1st								

== Club records ==
=== Men ===
- All time scorer - Notis Chalkidis, 965 points
- Single game record - Jeb Spink, 35 points (2022)
- Single season (Total points) - Dominic Norton, 322 points (2023-2024)
- Single season (Points per game) - Paul Tickner 19.3 points (2011-2012)

=== Women ===
- All time scorer - Ulrika Vistina, 747 points
- Single game record - Emer Owens, 30 points (2012)
- Single season (Total points) - Ulrika Vistina, 305 points (2023-2024)
- Single season (Points per game) - Ulrika Vistina, 20.3 points (2023-2024)
