= Stirling Knights B.C. =

Scottish basketball club

Stirling Knights
- League: SBC Division 1
- Established: 2010; 16 years ago
- History: Stirling Knights; 2010–present
- Arena: The Peak Centre
- Capacity: 400
- Location: Stirling, Scotland
- Team colours
- Head coach: Pete Duncan
- Website: Official website

The Stirling Knights are a Scottish basketball club based in the city of Stirling.

== Club ==
The club was founded in April 2010 by among others Head Coach Pete Duncan, entering the Men's National League in September as one of four new clubs to the league in the following season. The club received lottery funding - Awards4All late to help support capital costs of club equipment. The club is affiliated with Basketball Scotland, and fully supported by Active Stirling and sportscotland. The Knights have since developed a highly successful junior development program of over 500 members, as well as regularly producing players who represent Scotland. The success of the junior program is also a curse for the Senior team as often the best young players move onto the elite under-19 academies in England and abroad. In recent years, they have been one of the top clubs at U12, U14, U16 and U18 level with coaches Les McGlasson and Cory McCabe (National Team coach) enjoying success.

== Club Structure ==
=== Junior Teams ===
Under 18 Men (U18 National League Division 1)
Under 16 Men (U16 National League Division 1)
Under 16 Women (U16 National League Division 1)
Under 10, 12 and 14 Boys and Girls Regional League squads

=== Senior Teams ===
Senior Men (National League Division 1)

== Home arenas ==
The club are based at The Peak Sports Village in Stirling. It is a purpose-built sports facility at Forthbank and was opened in 2008 following an investment of over £27 million, and has a capacity of 400. It has some of the best facilities for sports, including basketball, in the whole of Scotland.

== Honours ==
Men's

Division 2 Champions (2): 2015-16, 2019-20

== Season-by-season records ==
Season	Division	Tier	League						Playoffs	Scottish Cup
Season	Division	Tier	Finish	Played	Wins	Losses	Points	Win %	Playoffs	Scottish Cup
Stirling Knights
2010–11	SNBL	2	5th	18	11	7	29	0.611	Did not qualify	
2011–12	SNBL	2	6th	18	7	11	25	0.389	Quarter-finals	
2012–13	SNBL	2	7th	18	5	13	23	0.278	Quarter-finals	Quarter-finals
2013–14	SNBL	2	9th	18	2	16	20	0.111	Did not qualify	1st round
2014–15	SNBL	2	12th	22	4	18	26	0.182	Did not qualify	Quarter-finals
2015–16	SBC D2	3	1st	15	11	4	26	0.733	No playoffs	Quarter-finals
2016–17	SBC D1	2	6th	18	7	11	25	0.389	Quarter-finals	1st round
2017–18	SBC D1	2	7th	18	5	13	23	0.278	Quarter-finals	Quarter-finals
2018–19	SBC D1	2	9th	18	2	16	20	0.111	Did not qualify	Quarter-finals
2019–20	SBC D2	3	1st	18	16	2	32	0.889	No playoffs	Quarter-finals
2020–21	SBC D1	2	No season							
2021–22	SBC D1	2	5th	16	7	9	23	0.438	Did not qualify	2nd round
2022–23	SBC D1	2	6th	20	11	9	42	0.550	Did not qualify	2nd round
2023–24	SBC D1	2	4th	21	11	10	22	0.524	Semi-finals	Quarter-finals
