= Renfrew Rocks B.C. =

Renfrew Rocks
- League: SBC Division 1
- Established: 1989; 37 years ago
- Location: Renfrew, Scotland
- Team colours
- Head coach: (Scotland) Johnathan MacLeod
- Website: Official website

The Renfrew Rocks are a basketball club based in the town of Renfrew, Scotland. The club was founded in 1989 by Donny Henderson and Robert Taft, with players from the local Renfrew High School, where the club, consisting of several senior and junior teams, is still based. The senior men's team entered the Scottish National League Division 2 for the 2021–22 season, winning the league with an unbeaten record and reaching the semi-finals of the Scottish Cup. Following their undefeated season, the club gained a historic promotion to the Scottish Basketball top flight for the 2022-23 season. The club have a close partnership with the University of the West of Scotland, who compete in the British Universities and Colleges Sport Scottish Tier 1 League.

== Honours ==
Scottish National League Division 2 (1): 2021-22
Strathclyde League Basketball Association (3): 2016-17, 2018-19, 2021-22
Anderson Cup (2): 2017-18, 2018-19
Executive Cup (2): 2015-16, 2016-17

Junior Titles

Strathclyde League Basketball Association (1): 2014-15

SLBA Cup (2): 2017-18, 2018–19

== Season-by-season records ==
Season	Division	Tier	Regular Season					Post-Season	Scottish Cup
Season	Division	Tier	Finish	Played	Wins	Losses	Win %	Post-Season	Scottish Cup
Renfrew Rocks
2021–22	SBC Div 2	3	1st	10	10	0	1.000	No competition	Semi-finals
2022–23	SBC Div 1	2	7th	20	8	12	0.400	Did not qualify	1st round
2023–24	SBC Div 1	2	7th	21	4	17	0.190	Did not qualify	2nd Round

== Roster ==
Renfrew Rocks roster
Players
Coaches

Pos.	No.	Nat.	Name	Ht.	Wt.	Age
SG	1	(Canada) (Scotland)	Pieramarchi, Vlad	1.91 m (6 ft 3 in)
PG	2	(Scotland)	Lockhart, Milo	1.88 m (6 ft 2 in)
SG	3	(Scotland)	McGoran, Thomas	1.88 m (6 ft 2 in)
G	4	(United States)	Carroll, Kris	1.85 m (6 ft 1 in)
G	6	(Scotland) (Egypt)	Fadel, Baraa (injured)	1.85 m (6 ft 1 in)
G	7	(Scotland)	Doyle, Marcus (C)	1.85 m (6 ft 1 in)
G	8	(Scotland)	McQuarrie, Martin	1.85 m (6 ft 1 in)
G/F	9	(Scotland)	Keegan, Matthew	1.88 m (6 ft 2 in)
PG	10	(Scotland)	Thomson, Jack	1.86 m (6 ft 1 in)
G	11	(Scotland)	Stevenson, Liam (VC)	1.85 m (6 ft 1 in)
F	12	(Scotland) (Sweden)	Wakazadi, Shiloh	1.90 m (6 ft 3 in)
G	13	(Scotland)	Alexander, Calum	1.90 m (6 ft 3 in)
F	13	(Scotland)	Brand, Callum	1.90 m (6 ft 3 in)
G/F	17	(New Zealand)	Graham, Shay	1.95 m (6 ft 5 in)
F/C	33	(Scotland)	Pettit, Jonathan	1.97 m (6 ft 6 in)

Head coach

- (Scotland) Johnathan MacLeod

Assistant coach(es)

- (Scotland) Kevin McDonald

Legend

- (C) Team captain
- Injured

- Roster
Updated: December 11, 2021
