= Dundee Madsons B.C. =

Scottish basketball club

The Dundee Madsons are a basketball club based in the Menzieshill area of the city of Dundee, Scotland. The club was founded as Menzieshill B.C. in 1964. The club's most notable former player is Harry Morrice, who plays centre for the North Carolina A&T Aggies men's basketball team in NCAA Division I. The senior men's team competed in the Scottish Men's National League from 1974 to 1980, and re-entered the Scottish National League Division 2 in 2021.

== Season-by-season records ==
Season	Division	Tier	Regular Season						Post-Season	Scottish Cup
Season	Division	Tier	Finish	Played	Wins	Losses	Points	Win %	Post-Season	Scottish Cup
Dundee Madsons
2021–22	SBC Div 2	3	4th	10	5	5	15	0.500	No playoffs	1st round
2022–23	SBC Div 2	3	3rd	18	11	7	40	0.611	No playoffs	2nd round
