= North Lanarkshire Chiefs B.C. =

North Lanarkshire Chiefs
- League: SBC Division 2
- Established: 1973; 53 years ago
- History: Cumbernauld Chiefs (1973-2014); North Lanarkshire Chiefs (2014-present)
- Location: North Lanarkshire, Scotland
- Team colours
- Website: Facebook page

The North Lanarkshire Chiefs are a Scottish basketball club, based in the town of Cumbernauld, Scotland.

== Club ==
The club was founded as the Cumbernauld Chiefs in 1973.

For many years, the Chiefs were relatively successful at local level, however their primary focus was the development of an extensive junior program which continues to this day. This program regularly engages with hundreds of local kids per week.

In 2014, the club changed its name to the North Lanarkshire Chiefs.

In 2018, the Chiefs entered the Men's National League Division 2, finishing 8th in their maiden season.

The Chiefs are an incorporated charitable organisation (SC047704). They have been a recipient of Lottery funding.

== Teams ==
For the 2019-20 season, the Chiefs will field the following teams:

Senior Men - National League Division 2
Senior Men II - Strathclyde League Division 3

U18 Men - National League U18 Division 2
U16 Boys - National League U16 Division 2

U14 Boys - National League NDL South
U14 Girls - National League NDL West

== Home Venue ==
The Chiefs are based primarily at St. Maurice's High School and Greenfaulds High School in Cumbernauld.

== Season-by-season records ==
| Season | Division | Tier | Regular Season | | | | | | Post-Season | Scottish Cup |
| Season | Division | Tier | Finish | Played | Wins | Losses | Points | Win % | Post-Season | Scottish Cup |
|---|---|---|---|---|---|---|---|---|---|---|
North Lanarkshire Chiefs
| 2018–19 | SBC D2 | 3 | 8th | 16 | 3 | 13 | 19 | 0.188 | Did not qualify | Did not compete |
| 2019–20 | SBC D2 | 3 | 9th | 18 | 4 | 14 | 22 | 0.222 | Did not qualify | Did not compete |
| 2021–22 | SBC D2 | 3 | 2nd | 10 | 7 | 3 | 17 | 0.700 | No Playoffs | 1st round |
| 2022-23 | SBC D1 | 2 | 11th | 20 | 2 | 18 | 24 | 0.100 | Did not qualify | 2nd round |
