= Glasgow Storm =

- Established: 2001; 24 years ago
- History: Glasgow Storm; 2001–present
- Location: Glasgow, Scotland
- Team colours: Black and Yellow
- Website: Official website

The Glasgow Storm are a basketball club based in the city of Glasgow, Scotland.

== History ==
The club was founded in July 2001. The club currently puts out teams at all age levels, from under 12 through to the Senior Men's and Women's teams. The under 12s and under 14s teams were established with the help of National Lottery funding.

Storm Senior Men
The Storm entered the Scottish Men's National League in 2002. Based in the north and west of the city and playing home games latterly at the Kelvin Hall, the team were competitive and a comfortable mid-table team throughout their National League history, with 5th place in 2016-17 their strongest league performance. The Storm withdrew from the Scottish Basketball Championship at the start of the 2019-20 season, while maintaining their junior and local league presence.

== Teams ==
Senior Squads

Senior Men (National League Division 1)
2nd Men (Strathclyde League Division 1)
3rd Men (Strathclyde League Division 2)
4th Men (Strathclyde League Division 3)

Youth Squads

U18 Men (Strathclyde League U18's)
U16 Men (Strathclyde League U16's)

== Home arenas ==
Scotstoun Sports Centre
Glasgow Kelvin College (formerly North Glasgow College)
Kelvin Hall

== Season-by-season records ==
Season	Div.	Pos.	Pld.	W	L	Pts.	Playoffs	Scottish Cup
Glasgow Storm
2002–2003	SNBL	9th	18	2	16	20	No playoffs	Last 16
2003–2004	SNBL	9th	18	1	17	19	No playoffs	Last 16
2004–2005	SNBL	6th	17	8	9	25	No playoffs	
2005–2006	SNBL	-	-	-	-	-	No playoffs	
2006–2007	SNBL	6th	16	8	8	24	No playoffs	
2007–2008	SNBL	6th	16	7	9	23	No playoffs	
2008–2009	SNBL	6th	20	2	18	22	No playoffs	
2009–2010	SNBL	5th	19	3	16	22	No playoffs	
2010–2011	SNBL	8th	18	5	13	23	DNQ	
2011–2012	SNBL	8th	18	7	11	25	Quarter-finals	1st round
2012–2013	SNBL	10th	18	2	16	20	DNQ	1st round
2013–2014	SNBL	8th	18	6	12	24	Quarter-finals	Quarter-finals
2014–2015	SNBL	7th	22	8	14	30	Quarter-finals	1st round
2015–2016	SBC Div 1	7th	18	6	12	24	Semi-finals	Semi-finals
2016–2017	SBC Div 1	5th	18	9	9	27	Semi-finals	Quarter-finals
2017–2018	SBC Div 1	6th	18	5	13	23	Quarter-finals	Quarter-finals
2018–2019	SBC Div 1	6th	18	9	9	27	Quarter-finals	2nd round
