= Pleasance B.C. =

- League: SBC Division 2
- Established: 1947
- History: Pleasance; 1947–present
- Arena: Forrester High School
- Location: Edinburgh, Scotland
- Team colours
- Website: Official website

Pleasance Basketball Club are a basketball club based in Edinburgh, Scotland .

== History ==
The club was the founded in 1947, one of the first basketball clubs formed in Scotland. Led by club stalwart Jock Kerr Hunter, and along with Heriot's, Polonia and Redford, they formed the East of Scotland Basketball Association, and the Amateur Basketball Association of Scotland.

Five Pleasance players (Ray Campbell, Jimmy Carter, Jock Fisher, George Hill and Grant Hutchison) were in the first Scotland international squad in face England in 1947, and seven players would represent Scotland at the European Championships in Paris in 1951.

Pleasance would win the first two Scottish Cups, defeating Aberdeen University at the Kelvin Hall in Glasgow in 1947, and defeating Jordanhill at Princes Street Gardens in Edinburgh in 1948.

During the 1970s the club competed regularly in the second division of the Lothian League. The club took the step up to the first division when the league matches moved to a central venue in Edinburgh. Gradually better players were attracted to join the club, and this culminated in the winning of the Lothian Cup in 1990, defeating the fancied Edinburgh University side.

In the intervening years Pleasance have been a strong Lothian League side, regularly finishing in the top 3 positions. After a few seasons of struggling by their own standards, the team bounced back by winning the Lothian League in the 2015–16 season.

== Current teams ==
Pleasance compete in Division 2 of the Scottish Basketball Championship. The club will have 4 teams playing in the 2019–20 season:

- Pleasance - National League 1
- Pleasance B - Lothian League Division 1
- Pleasance Pace - Lothian League Division 2
- Pleasance 47s - Lothian League Division 3

== Season-by-season records ==
Season	League	Tier	Pos.	Pld.	W	L	Pts.	Playoffs	Scottish Cup
Pleasance B.C.
2011–12	Lothian Div 1	4	7th	18	7	11	32	-	
2012–13	Lothian Div 1	4	8th	20	7	13	34	-	
2013–14	Lothian Div 1	4	5th	20	11	9	42	-	
2014–15	Lothian Div 1	4	5th	20	11	9	42	-	
2015–16	Lothian Div 1	4	1st	10	8	2	26	-	Preliminary Round
2016–17	SBC D2	3	1st	14	12	2	26	Winners	Quarter-finals
2017–18	SBC D1	2	10th	18	3	15	21	Relegated to D2	Semi-finals
2018–19	SBC D2	3	6th	16	8	8	24	Did not qualify	1st round
2019–20	SBC D2	3	6th	18	6	12	24	Did not qualify	1st round
