= Granite City Grizzlies =

- League: SBC Division 2
- Established: 2009
- Arena: Beach Leisure Centre
- Location: Aberdeen, Scotland
- Team colours: Navy and White
- Website: Official website

The Granite City Grizzlies are a basketball club based in Aberdeen, Scotland. The senior men's team compete in Division 2 of the Scottish Men's National League.

== History ==
The club was established in 2009 with a senior men's team, winning the Grampian cup title in their debut season. In 2011 the club welcomed its first senior women's team which had a successful first season taking home the Grampian league and Cup titles.

== Season-by-season records ==
Season	Div.	Pos.	Pld.	W	L	Pts.	Play Offs	Scottish Cup
Granite City Grizzlies
2014–2015	SNBL Div2	2nd	6	5	1	11	N/A	1st Round
2015–2016	SBC Div2	2nd	15	11	4	26	N/A	1st Round

== Honours ==
- National Chairman's Cup
  - 2016
