= Perth Phoenix B.C. =

- League: SBC Division 1
- Established: 2003; 23 years ago
- History: Perth Phoenix (2003–present)
- Arena: North Inch Campus
- Location: Perth, Scotland
- Website: Official website

Perth Phoenix B.C. is a Scottish basketball club, based in the city of Perth, Scotland.

== History ==
The club was founded in 2003 by a group of locals, initially only as a senior men's team. The club now supports six boys and girls youth teams, four of which compete in their respective National Leagues.

== Home Venue ==
- North Inch Community Campus
- Perth High School
- Perth Academy
- Perth College UHI

== Season-by-season records ==
Season	Division	Tier	Regular Season						Post-Season	Scottish Cup
Season	Division	Tier	Finish	Played	Wins	Losses	Points	Win %	Post-Season	Scottish Cup
Perth Phoenix
2017–18	SBC Div 2	3	4th	14	9	5	18	0.643	Semi Finals	DNC
2018–19	SBC Div 2	3	3rd	16	11	5	22	0.688	Runners Up	1st Round
2019–20	SBC Div 1	2	6th	16	6	10	22	0.375	Quarter Finals	Quarter Finals
2020–21	SBC Div 1	2	Season cancelled due to COVID-19 pandemic							
2021–22	Withdrew from league									
2022–23	SBC Div 2	3	7th	18	2	16	22	0.111	DNQ	2nd Round
