= Edinburgh University Basketball Club =

Basketball club based at the University of Edinburgh

Edinburgh University Basketball Club are a basketball club based at the University of Edinburgh in the city of Edinburgh, Scotland.

== Men ==
The University's men's team have a long history in Scottish basketball, winning the Scottish Cup on four occasions between 1949 and 1965. They competed in National League Division 1 for a total of six seasons, 1 season in 2007-08 and five seasons from 2014 to 2019. Their strongest finish was a 3rd place achieved in 2016. The team withdrew from the National League at the end of the 2018-19 season, although they still compete annually in the Scottish Cup.

=== Honours ===
Scottish Cup (1949, 1950, 1960, 1965)

=== Season-by-season records ===
Season	Division	Pos.	Pld.	W	L	Pts.	Play Offs	Scottish Cup
Edinburgh University
2007–08	SNBL	9th	16	0	16	16	Did not qualify	
Edinburgh University
2014–15	SNBL	4th	22	16	6	38	Semi-finals	Semi-finals
2015–16	SBC Div 1	3rd	18	13	5	31	Runners Up	Runners Up
2016–17	SBC Div 1	7th	18	6	12	24	Quarter-finals	Semi-finals
2017–18	SBC Div 1	9th	18	5	13	22	Did not qualify	Quarter-finals
2018–19	SBC Div 1	10th	18	1	17	19	Did not qualify	2nd round

== Women ==
=== Honours ===
Scottish Cup (2016, 2018)
National League Champions (2016)
National League Playoffs Champions (2016, 2018)

=== Season-by-season records ===
Season	Division	Pos.	Pld.	W	L	Pts.	Play Offs	Scottish Cup
Edinburgh University
2015–16	SBC	1st	18	18	0	36	Winners	Winners
2016–17	SBC	3rd	15	9	6	24	Semi-finals	Semi-finals
2017–18	SBC	3rd	15	10	5	25	Winners	Winners
2018–19	SBC	3rd	16	11	5	27	Semi-finals	Runners Up
2019–20	SBC	5th	16	7	9	23	No playoffs	1st round
