= Dunfermline Reign B.C. =

- League: SBC Division 1
- Established: 1986; 40 years ago
- History: Dunfermline Reign; 1986–present
- Arena: St Columba's RC High School
- Capacity: 200
- Location: Dunfermline, Scotland
- Team colours
- Website: Official website

The Dunfermline Reign are a Scottish basketball club based in the city of Dunfermline, Scotland.

== History ==
The club have been an affiliated member of basketballscotland since their formation in 1986, and for many years the club was the only national and local league basketball team in Fife.

== Home Venue ==
The club moved its home games to St Columba's RC High School in 2014 after the school won in its bid for a court removed from the London 2012 Olympic basketball site. The floor was the one that former player Robert Archibald ended his playing career on at the 2012 Olympics.

Queen Anne High School
St Columba's RC High School (2014–present)

== Honours ==
- Men's National League Champions: 2018–19 (1)

Youth:
Under 14s won the u14s 2019-2020 Scottish league with the best run in there history, only one loss from 54 games a league win and topping the table by 38 points. For the first time ever the top five scorers in the league were all of the same team, with:

- No.10 scoring 378 points
- No.7 scoring 368 points
- No.15 scoring 327 points
- No.32 scoring 295 points
- No.3 scoring 212 points
- and the most three pointers in a single game by team in game (26).

The under 18s and 16s league games could not commence this year as there were not enough teams to compete.

- basketballscotland 'Approved' club
- First Positive Coaching Scotland accredited basketball club in Scotland

== Season-by-season records ==
Season	Division	Tier	League						Playoffs	Scottish Cup
Season	Division	Tier	Finish	Played	Wins	Losses	Points	Win %	Playoffs	Scottish Cup
Dunfermline Reign
1997–1998	SNBL	2	8th	24	6	18	30	0.250		
1998–1999	SNBL	2	9th	27	4	23	35	0.148		
1999–2000	SNBL	2	9th	18	4	14	22	0.222	Did not qualify	
2000–2002	Withdrew from league									
Royal Bengal Dunfermline Reign
2002–2003	SNBL	2	6th	18	10	8	28	0.556		
2003–2004	SNBL	2	6th	18	10	8	28	0.556		
2004–2005	SNBL	2	10th	16	3	13	19	0.188		
2005–2010	Withdrew from league									
Dunfermline Reign
2010–2011	SNBL	2	10th	18	1	17	19	0.056	Did not qualify	
2011–2012	SNBL	2	10th	18	1	17	19	0.056	Did not qualify	
2012–2013	SNBL	2	9th	18	3	15	21	0.167	Did not qualify	
2013–2014	SNBL	2	10th	18	1	17	19	0.056	Did not qualify	
2014–2015	SNBL	2	9th	22	6	16	28	0.273	Did not qualify	1st round
2015–2016	SBC Div 1	2	9th	18	3	15	21	0.167	Did not qualify	Quarter-finals
2016–2017	SBC Div 1	2	8th	18	6	12	24	0.333	Quarter-finals	Quarter-finals
2017–2018	SBC Div 1	2	5th	18	12	6	30	0.667	Quarter-finals	2nd round
2018–2019	SBC Div 1	2	1st	18	17	1	34	0.944	Semi-finals	Semi-finals
2019–2020	SBC Div 1	2	3rd	16	12	4	28	0.750	No playoffs	Semi-finals
2020–2021	SBC Div 1	2	Season cancelled due to COVID-19 pandemic							
2021–2022	SBC Div 1	2	7th	16	5	11	21	0.313	Did not qualify	Runners Up
2022–2023	SBC Div 1	2	5th	20	11	9	42	0.550	Did not qualify	Quarter-finals
2023–2024	SBC Div 1	2	6th	21	9	12	18	0.429	Did not qualify	Runners Up

== Players ==
=== Notable former players ===
Note: Flags indicate national team eligibility at FIBA-sanctioned events. Players may hold other non-FIBA nationalities not displayed.

Criteria

To appear in this section a player must have either:

- Set a club record or won an individual award while at the club
- Played at least one official international match for their national team at any time
- Played at least one official NBA match at any time.

- (United Kingdom) (Scotland) Robert Archibald
