= Tayside Musketeers =

Tayside Musketeers BC
- Established: 1993
- History: Arbroath Musketeers; 1993-2014; Tayside Musketeers; 2014-present
- Location: Arbroath, Scotland
- Team colours: Green, White and Black

The Tayside Musketeers are a Scottish basketball club based in the town of Arbroath, Scotland.

== History ==
Originally formed in 1993 by coach John Grant as Arbroath Musketeers, the club has gone through a range of changes and is now developing a range of teams under the direction of Steve Oakley (Director of Basketball) and a strong committee headed by Darren Logan (Chairman).

The Senior Men's team rejoined the Scottish Men's National League at the start of the 2014-2015 season for the first time since their only previous appearance, in 2002-03. The team resigned midway through the 2016-17 season.

The Senior Women's team joined the Women's National League at the start of the 2015-16 season.

== Honours ==
Junior Men (Under 18)

Scottish Cup Winners (1996, 2002 )
National League Division 1 Winners (2001, 2013)
National League Division 2 Winners (1998, 2000)

Cadet Men (Under 16)

Scottish Cup Winners (1995, 2000)
National League Division 1 Winners (1994, 2000, 2011)
National League Division 1 Playoffs Winners (2011)
National League Division 2 Winners (2008)

== Men's season-by-season records ==
Season	Div.	Pos.	Pld.	W	L	Pts.	Play Offs	Scottish Cup
Arbroath Musketeers
2002–03	SNBL	10th	18	0	18	18	Did not qualify	
Tayside Musketeers
2014–15	SNBL	10th	22	5	17	27	Did not qualify	Quarter-finals
2015–16	SBC Div 1	8th	18	4	14	22	Quarter-finals	1st round
2016–17	SBC Div 1	10th	18	2	16	13	Did not qualify	1st round
2016–21	Withdrew from league							
2021–22	SBC Div 2	3rd	10	6	4	16	No playoffs	Did not compete
2022–23	SBC Div 2	4th	18	9	9	36	No playoffs	1st round

- The team withdrew from the 2016-17 season with seven games remaining.
