= St Mirren B.C. =

- League: SBC Division 1
- Established: 1997; 28 years ago
- History: St Mirren McDonalds; 1997–2002; St Mirren RKC; 2002–2013; St Mirren WCS; 2013–2019; St Mirren; 2019-present
- Arena: Lagoon Leisure Centre
- Capacity: 360
- Location: Paisley, Scotland
- Team colours

St Mirren B.C. are a Scottish basketball club based in the town of Paisley. The club started as part of the Paisley & District Basketball Association in 1997, although the association had begun basketball-related activities in 1995. St Mirren McDonald's, as they were then known, was launched at a press conference in St Mirren Football Stadium. The team won the Scottish Cup for the first time in 1999, defeating Edinburgh 70–62, at the Kelvin Hall International Sports Arena. Their second Scottish Cup success came three years later against the same opposition, defeating the Kings 61-51 at Meadowbank. The team won their first National League title in 2000 in front of 600 frenzied home fans at the Saints Arena.

== Honours ==
Scottish Cup (4): 1999-00, 2001-02, 2011-12, 2015-16
Scottish Men's National League (3): 1999-00, 2017-18, 2021-22
Scottish Men's National League Playoffs (2): 1999-00, 2021-22

== Season-by-season records ==
Season	Div.	Pos.	Pld.	W	L	Pts.	Play-offs	Scottish Cup
St Mirren McDonalds
1997–98	SNBL	5th	24	10	14	34		
1998–99	SNBL	2nd	27	23	4	73	No playoffs	Winners
1999–00	SNBL	1st	18	17	1	35	Winners	Runners-up
2000–01	SNBL	3rd						
2001–02	SNBL	5th	16	9	7	25		Winner
St Mirren Reid Kerr College
2002–03	SNBL	3rd	18	13	5	31	No playoffs	Semi-finals
2003–04	SNBL	4th	18	12	6	30	No playoffs	Semi-finals
2004–05	SNBL	5th	16	9	7	25	No playoffs	
2005–06	SNBL	6th						
2006–07	SNBL	3rd	16	10	6	26	No playoffs	
2007–08	SNBL	4th	16	11	5	27	No playoffs	Semi-finals
2008–09	SNBL	3rd	20	13	7	33	No playoffs	Runners-up
2009-10	SNBL	3rd	20	13	7	33	No playoffs	Quarter-finals
2010–11	SNBL	3rd	18	13	5	31	Runners-up	Runners-up
2011–12	SNBL	3rd	18	14	4	32	Semi-finals	Winners
2012–13	SNBL	5th	18	11	7	29	Quarter-finals	Last 16
St Mirren West College Scotland
2013–14	SNBL	2nd	18	15	3	33	Runners-up	Runners-up
2014–15	SNBL	3rd	22	16	6	38	Semi-finals	Runners-up
2015–16	SBC Div 1	4th	18	12	6	30	Quarter-finals	Winners
2016–17	SBC Div 1	2nd	18	15	3	33	Semi-finals	Quarter-finals
2017–18	SBC Div 1	1st	18	16	2	34	Runners Up	Quarter-finals
St Mirren
2018–19	SBC Div 1	3rd	18	13	5	31	Semi-finals	Runners Up
2019–20	SBC Div 1	2nd	16	13	3	29	No playoffs	Runners Up
2021–22	SBC Div 1	1st	16	14	2	30	Winners	Semi-finals
2022–23	SBC Div 1	3rd	20	17	3	34	Semi-finals	Semi-finals
2023–24	SBC Div 1	3rd	21	14	7	28	Runners Up	Quarter-finals
