= Boroughmuir Blaze Basketball Club =

Boroughmuir Blaze B.C.
- League: SBC Division 1
- Established: 1961; 65 years ago
- History: Boroughmuir; 1961-2004; Boroughmuir Blaze; 2004-present
- Arena: The Crags Centre
- Location: Edinburgh, Scotland
- Team colours
- Website: www.cragsedinburgh.com/background-blaze-basketball-club

Boroughmuir Blaze Basketball Club is a basketball club based in the city of Edinburgh, Scotland.

== History ==
=== Boroughmuir (1961-2004) ===
The club was founded in 1961 with an initial nucleus of players from Edinburgh's Boroughmuir High School. The club's heyday came in the late 1960s when players like Tony Wilson, Mel Capaldi, John Tunnah, Brian Carmichael and Bill McInnes went on to form the backbone of the Scotland national basketball team. A highlight of this period came in 1967 when Boroughmuir became the first British team to participate in a European cup competition. They were drawn against the mighty Real Madrid and played their home tie at Murrayfield Ice Rink before a crowd of nearly 1,000.

=== Blaze (2004-present) ===
The Blaze moniker was introduced in 2004 and in recent years the club has rejuvenated its development program with the club now having over 100 members with teams at every age group from Under 12 through to Over 50s. The club's growth is reflected by entry in the U16 National League since 2005/06 and the U18 National League from 2006/07. The Senior Men's team re-entered the National League in 2011 after 3 years away, and won their first National League title in 38 years, and completed the league-playoffs double, in 2016. In season 2022/23 Blaze senior men won the domestic treble - league, cup and post season play-offs.

== Bill McInnes ==
Bill McInnes enjoyed a distinguished playing career with Boroughmuir in Edinburgh; he was a member of the team which dominated domestically in Scotland the 1960s and 1970s, and were British Rose Bowl champions in 1972. He also played on Boroughmuir teams that entered the FIBA European Champions Cup and FIBA European Cup Winners' Cup on five occasions in that time. He represented both Scotland and Great Britain on 176 occasions, starting all his 28 competitive GB games, and finishing as the leading scorer in eight of them. He was the leading scorer in the 1968 European Pre-Olympic event with 119 points in seven games. He was the second top scorer in 3 other Olympic qualifying events, finishing with 354 points, for a 12.6ppg average. Off the court, Bill was a founder member of Boroughmuir. Bill coached at all levels and was secretary to the club since 1961. He later served as Chair of the British Basketball Federation, was a member of the National Olympic Committee, Chair of the British Masters Basketball Association and was a director with Basketball Scotland, which he previously chaired from 1990 to 2008. He was awarded the FIBA Order of Merit posthumously after his death in 2017.

== Season-by-season records ==
Prior to the 1997–98 season, Boroughmuir competed in every National League season since its formation in 1969, winning 9 of their 10 league titles to date consecutively (1969–70, 1970–71, 1971–72, 1972–73, 1973–74, 1974–75, 1975–76, 1976–77, 1977–78).

Seasons 1997-2008
Season	Div.	Pos.	Pld.	W	L	Pts.	Play Offs	Scottish Cup
Boroughmuir
1997–1998	SNBL	7th	24	6	18	30		
1998–1999	SNBL	8th	27	7	20	34		
1999–2000	SNBL	10th	18	2	16	20	Did not qualify	
2000–2001	SNBL	8th						
2001–2002	SNBL	8th	17	6	11	23		
2002–2003	SNBL	8th	18	4	14	22		
2003–2004	SNBL	7th	18	8	10	26		
2004–2005	SNBL	8th						
Boroughmuir Blaze
2005–2006	SNBL							Semi-finals
2006–2007	SNBL	4th	16	10	6	26		Semi-finals
2007–2008	SNBL	8th	16	2	14	18		

Season	Division	Tier	Regular Season						Post-Season	Scottish Cup
Season	Division	Tier	Finish	Played	Wins	Losses	Points	Win %	Post-Season	Scottish Cup
Boroughmuir Blaze
2011-12	SNBL	2	7th	18	7	11	25	0.389	Quarter-finals	Semi-finals
2012-13	SNBL	2	6th	18	8	10	26	0.444	Quarter-finals	Semi-finals
2013-14	SNBL	2	4th	18	10	8	28	0.556	Quarter-finals	Quarter-finals
2014-15	SNBL	2	2nd	22	17	5	39	0.773	Runners Up	Quarter-finals
2015–16	SBC Div 1	2	1st	18	15	3	33	0.833	Winners	Quarter-finals
2016–17	SBC Div 1	2	3rd	18	14	4	32	0.778	Runners Up	Runners Up
2017–18	SBC Div 1	2	4th	18	13	5	31	0.722	Semi-finals	Runners Up
2018–19	SBC Div 1	2	5th	18	11	7	29	0.611	Quarter-finals	Quarter-finals
2019–20	SBC Div 1	2	4th	16	10	6	26	0.625	Quarter-finals	Winners
2020–21	SBC D1	2	No season							
2021–22	SBC D1	2	4th	16	11	5	27	0.688	Semi-finals	Quarter-finals
2022–23	SBC D1	2	1st	20	18	2	56	0.900	Winners	Winners
2023–24	SBC D1	2	2nd	21	18	3	36	0.957	Semi-finals	Semi-finals

== Record in European competition ==
Win Loss

Season	Competition	Round	Opponent	Home	Away	Aggregate
1967-68	FIBA European Champions Cup	First round	(Spain) Real Madrid	69-108	126-43	112-234
1968-69	FIBA European Cup Winners' Cup	First round	(Belgium) Anderlecht	75-109	103-52	127-212
1969-70	FIBA European Champions Cup	First round	(Belgium) Racing Mechelen	84-123	144-120	204-267
1970-71	FIBA European Cup Winners' Cup	First round	(Spain) Juventud	77-92	106-64	141-198
1973-74	FIBA European Champions Cup	First round	(Netherlands) Haarlem	74-129	126-70	144-255
1976-77	FIBA European Cup Winners' Cup	First round	(Iceland) Njarðvík	87-66	77-78	165-143
1976-77	FIBA European Cup Winners' Cup	Round of 16	(Spain) Juventud	66-111	126-64	130-237
