= Scottish Basketball Championship Men =

Basketball league in Scotland

Scottish Basketball Championship
- Current season, competition or edition: 2026–27 Scottish Basketball Championship Men season
- Founded: 1969; 57 years ago
- No. of teams: 8
- Country: Scotland
- Most recent champions: Falkirk Fury (9th title)
- Most titles: Boroughmuir Blaze (11 titles)
- Level on pyramid: 3
- Domestic cup: Scottish Cup
- Website: Official website

The Scottish Basketball Championship Men is the national basketball league of Scotland. The league forms the third tier of British basketball (inline with the National Basketball League) after Super League Basketball, where Scotland currently has one representative in the Caledonia Gladiators, and British Championship Basketball.

Each season, teams compete in a round-robin league format, with the team finishing top of Division 1 crowned champion. Currently, the four highest-finishing teams at the end of the league season then enter a play-off tournament to determine the Playoffs champion.

== History ==
In its present form, the Scottish Basketball Championship traces its legacy to the Scottish National Basketball League, which was founded in 1969. Its origins lie in the regional East of Scotland and West of Scotland leagues of the 1940s and 1950s; the Scottish Cup, first contested in 1947; a first attempt to organise a National League competition in 1957, and the Scottish-American League of the late 1960s, which included teams from United States military bases in Scotland, such as USN Edzell.

== Teams ==
Listed below are all the teams competing in the 2026-27 Scottish Basketball Championship season.

Location of teams in 2026–27 SBC Division 1

Club	Location	Founded
Boroughmuir Blaze	Edinburgh	1961
Caledonia Blues	East Kilbride	2025
City of Edinburgh Kings	Edinburgh	1988
Dunfermline Reign	Dunfermline	1986
Falkirk Fury	Falkirk	1992
Grampian Ignite	Aberdeen	2000
Renfrew Rocks	Renfrew	1989
St Mirren	Paisley	1999

== Results ==
=== League ===
No.	Season	Champion
1	1969-70	Boroughmuir (1)
2	1970-71	Boroughmuir (2)
3	1971-72	Boroughmuir (3)
4	1972-73	Boroughmuir (4)
5	1973-74	Boroughmuir (5)
6	1974-75	Boroughmuir (6)
7	1975-76	Boroughmuir (7)
8	1976-77	Boroughmuir (8)
9	1977-78	Boroughmuir (9)
10	1978-79	Paisley (1)
11	1979-80	MIM Edinburgh (1)
12	1980-81	MIM Edinburgh (2)
13	1981-82	MIM Edinburgh (3)
14	1982-83	MIM Edinburgh (4)
15	1983-84	MIM Edinburgh (5)
16	1984-85	Falkirk Team Solripe (1)
17	1985-86	MIM Edinburgh (6)
18	1986-87	MIM Livingston (7)
19	1987-88	Cumnock Curries (1)
20	1988-89	MIM Livingston (8)

No.	Season	Champion
21	1989-90	MIM Livingston (9)
22	1990-91	MIM Livingston (10)
23	1991-92	Livingston Bulls (1)
24	1992-93	Livingston Bulls (2)
25	1993-94	Livingston Bulls (3)
26	1994-95	Livingston Bulls (4)
27	1995-96	Livingston Bulls (5)
28	1996-97	Livingston Bulls (6)
29	1997-98	Midlothian Bulls (7)
30	1998-99	Glasgow Sports Division (1)
31	1999-00	St Mirren (1)
32	2000-01	Falkirk Fury (1)
33	2001-02	Troon Tornadoes (1)
34	2002-03	City of Edinburgh Kings (1)
35	2003-04	City of Edinburgh Kings (2)
36	2004-05	City of Edinburgh Kings (3)
37	2005-06	Troon Tornadoes (2)
38	2006-07	City of Edinburgh Kings (4)
39	2007-08	City of Edinburgh Kings (5)
40	2008-09	City of Edinburgh Kings (6)

No.	Season	Champion
41	2009-10	City of Edinburgh Kings (7)
42	2010-11	City of Edinburgh Kings (8)
43	2011-12	City of Edinburgh Kings (9)
44	2012-13	Falkirk Fury (2)
45	2013-14	Falkirk Fury (3)
46	2014-15	Falkirk Fury (4)
47	2015-16	Boroughmuir Blaze (10)
48	2016-17	Falkirk Fury (5)
49	2017-18	St Mirren (2)
50	2018-19	Dunfermline Reign (1)
51	2019-20	Falkirk Fury (6)
	2020-21	No competition
52	2021-22	St Mirren (3)
53	2022-23	Boroughmuir Blaze (11)
54	2023-24	Falkirk Fury (7)
55	2024-25	Falkirk Fury (8)
56	2025–26	Falkirk Fury (9)

=== Playoffs ===
Season	Champion
2010-11	City of Edinburgh Kings
2011-12	City of Edinburgh Kings
2012-13	City of Edinburgh Kings
2013-14	Glasgow University
2014-15	Falkirk Fury
2015-16	Boroughmuir Blaze
2016-17	Falkirk Fury
2017-18	City of Edinburgh Kings
2018-19	City of Edinburgh Kings
2019-20	Not played
2020-21	Not played
2021-22	St Mirren
2022-23	Boroughmuir Blaze
2023-24	Falkirk Fury
2024-25	Falkirk Fury
2025–26	Falkirk Fury
