= Ayrshire Tornadoes B.C. =

- League: SBC Division 1
- Established: 1991; 35 years ago
- History: Troon; 1991-1998; Troon Tornadoes; 1998-2015; Ayrshire Tornadoes; 2015-present
- Location: Dalry, North Ayrshire
- Website: Official website

The Ayrshire Tornadoes are a Scottish basketball club based in Dalry, North Ayrshire.

== History ==
The club was founded in 1991 as Troon Basketball Club, playing home games at Marr College, Troon. As one of Scotland's leading amateur basketball clubs, the club joined the Scottish Men's National League for the 1998–99 season as the Troon Tornadoes, quickly establishing themselves as a very capable National League team. Their first title came 4 years later, winning the Scottish National League in 2002, with only a single defeat all season.

The Tornadoes would finish in the top-3 teams for 5 of the next 6 seasons, including another National League title in 2006. During this period the Tornadoes also claimed the Scottish Cup title on three occasions. From 2008 onwards, the club remained competitive in the National League albeit in a slow and steady decline down the league standings.

In 2015, the club moved from their traditional home in Troon to Dalry, and rebranded as the Ayrshire Tornadoes to reflect the wide area across which the club attracted players and hoped to develop a wider community programme. Unfortunately these plans did not stop the decline of the senior men's team, who after finishing 10th in Division 1, were relegated into the newly formed Division 2. The Tornadoes spent three seasons in Division 2, eventually achieving promotion back to Division 1 in 2019.

== Teams ==
Senior Men (National League Division 1)
Senior Men B (Strathclyde League Division 2)
U18 Men (National League Division 1)
U16 Men (National League Division 1)

== Honours ==
Scottish National League Champions (2002, 2006)
Scottish Cup Champions (2003, 2005, 2006)

== Professional players ==
In the summer of 2006, several players formed part of a mass exodus towards professional basketball clubs including, Dan Wardrope (to Guildford Heat), Brian McCotter (to Newcastle Eagles), and Andy Pearson (to Scottish Rocks).

== Season-by-season records ==
Seasons 1998-2015
Season	Division	Tier	League						Playoffs	Scottish Cup
Season	Division	Tier	Finish	Played	Wins	Losses	Points	Win %	Playoffs	Scottish Cup
Troon Tornadoes
1998-1999	SNBL	2	7th	27	10	17	37	0.370		
1999-2000	SNBL	2	6th	18	7	11	25	0.389		
2000-2001	SNBL	2	6th	18	9	9	26	0.500		
2001-2002	SNBL	2	1st	17	16	1	33	0.941		
2002-2003	SNBL	2	2nd	18	15	3	33	0.833		Winners, beating City of Edinburgh Kings, 73-69
2003-2004	SNBL	2	3rd	18	12	6	30	0.667		
2004-2005	SNBL	2	2nd							Winners, beating City of Edinburgh Kings, 80-63
2005-2006	SNBL	2	1st							Winners, beating City of Edinburgh Kings, 79-65
2006-2007	SNBL	2	5th	17	10	7	27	0.588		
2007-2008	SNBL	2	3rd	16	12	4	26	0.750		
2008-2009	SNBL	2	4th	20	8	12	28	0.400		Semi-finals
2009-2010	SNBL	2	4th	20	10	10	30	0.500		Semi-finals
2010-2011	SNBL	2	6th	18	8	10	26	0.444	Did not qualify	
2011-2012	SNBL	2	4th	18	10	8	28	0.556	Quarter-finals	Quarter-finals
2012-2013	SNBL	2	4th	18	11	7	29	0.611	Semi-finals	Quarter-finals
2013-2014	SNBL	2	6th	18	8	10	26	0.444	Quarter-finals	2nd round
2014-2015	SNBL	2	8th	22	7	15	29	0.318	Quarter-finals	1st round

Season	Division	Tier	League						Playoffs	Scottish Cup
Season	Division	Tier	Finish	Played	Wins	Losses	Points	Win %	Playoffs	Scottish Cup
Ayrshire Tornadoes
2015-2016	SBC D1	2	10th	18	2	16	20	0.111	Did not qualify	1st round
2016-2017	SBC D2	3	6th	14	5	9	19	0.357	Did not qualify	1st round
2017-2018	SBC D2	3	5th	14	9	5	23	0.643	Did not qualify	2nd round
2018-2019	SBC D2	3	1st	16	14	2	28	0.875	Winners and Promoted to Division 1	Semi-finals
2019-2020	SBC D1	2	9th	16	1	15	16	0.063	Did not qualify	1st round
