= Glasgow University Sports Association =

Students' union in Glasgow City, Scotland

- Institution: University of Glasgow
- Location: Glasgow, Scotland, UK
- Established: 1881
- President: Eilidh McQuillan
- Affiliations: University of Glasgow
- Website: GUSA Website

Glasgow University Sports Association (formerly Glasgow University Athletic Club) is a student organisation at the University of Glasgow responsible for the promotion of sport and physical activity around campus.

== History ==
The Glasgow University Athletic Club was founded on 20 April 1881 and its constitution approved by the Senate ten days later. Its founding aim was to "promote all forms of Athletic Exercise", an aim which continues to this day. In 1903, a women's section was established at Queen Margaret College, the women's section of the University.

The Athletic Club provided representation on behalf of all students five years before the foundation of the Students' Representative Council, which now fulfills this role. Along with the Dialectic Society and Medico-Chirurgical Society, the Athletic Club was instrumental in founding the Glasgow University Union in 1885, and the two maintain a close relationship.

In 1996, the Club became the Glasgow University Sports Association, a name intended to encapsulate better the work done by the organisation.

== Activities ==
The Association provides financial, administrative and representational support to individuals and groups involved in sport and recreation at University of Glasgow.

The highlight of the Association's year is the GUSA Ball (or Annual Awards Dinner and Dance) in February, a black-tie affair at which Blues, Half-Blues and Awards are presented to successful athletes and teams. Previous Blues winners include Sir Menzies Campbell and Rebecca Cooke.

=== Affiliated Clubs ===
There are 52 sports clubs at the University affiliated to the Sports Association, which assists them financially and in obtaining transport, equipment and publicity.

- Aikido
- American Football
- Athletics
- Badminton
- Basketball (men's and women's)
- Boat (Rowing)
- Bowling (staff)
- Boxing
- Canoe
- Cheerleading
- Cricket
- Curling
- Cycling
- Fencing
- Football (men's and women's)
- Gaelic Football
- Golf
- Gymnastics
- Hares and Hounds
- Hockey (men's and women's)
- Judo
- Karate
- Kendo
- Lacrosse
- Mountaineering
- Muay Thai Boxing
- Netball
- Potholing
- Riding
- Rugby (men's and women's)
- Sailing
- Shinty
- Shorinji Kempo
- Ski and Snowboard
- Skydive
- Squash
- Surf
- Swimming & Waterpolo
- Taekwondo
- Tennis
- Trampoline
- Triathlon
- Ultimate Frisbee
- Volleyball (men's and women's)
- Wakeboarding
- Weightlifting
- Yoga

=== Facilities ===
The Association works in partnership with the University of Glasgow Sport Service, which maintains the University's sports facilities. The Stevenson Building (or 'Stevie') on the University's main site in Gilmorehill houses a fitness suite, squash courts, sauna and six-lane 25m swimming pool, while the Garscube Estate near Bearsden, where the Faculty of Veterinary Medicine is based, offers a further fitness suite, six grass and two all-weather pitches, three tennis courts, a cricket oval and extensive grounds for walking and running. Students who join the Sport and Recreation Service also become members of GUSA, and therefore have access to all university sports facilities.

The Association's offices are located at 62 Oakfield Avenue on Gilmorehill, opposite the Stevenson Building.

== Management ==
The Association is managed by the GUSA Council, a body of 12 members elected in the Spring. The Council comprises the Executive (made up by the President, Vice-President, and Secretary), nine Convenors (Club Sport, Events, Health & Fitness, Finance, Publicity, Alumni, Travel, Welfare and Fundraising & Outreach). The position of President is a sabbatical post, for which the holder takes a year out from their studies and is paid by the University. The president for the 2026/27 academic year is Eilidh McQuillan.

Members of University Staff are also appointed to the Council to represent the Association to the management of the University. These are the Honorary President, Honorary Treasurer, Honorary Vice-President and Court and Senate Representatives. The current Honorary President is Professor Frank Coton, Vice-Principal for Learning and Development.
