= Falkirk Fury B.C. =

Scottish basketball team

Signs Express Falkirk Fury
- League: SBC Division 1
- Established: 1992; 34 years ago
- History: Falkirk Fury; 1992-1998; Clark Eriksson Fury; 1998-2015; Sony Centre Fury; 2015-present
- Arena: Grangemouth Complex
- Capacity: 300
- Location: Falkirk, Scotland
- Head coach: (Scotland) John Bunyan
- Website: Official website

Falkirk Fury, currently known as Signs Express Falkirk Fury for sponsorship reasons, is a Scottish basketball club based in the town of Falkirk, Scotland.

== History ==
The club was established in 1992 by founders John Bunyan, Keith Bunyan and Gregor Gillies and originally consisted of players from Falkirk High School and local sports development players. The club now competes at all National League age groups, and supports an extensive and strong junior program.

The under 23 team rose to join the Scottish Men's National League in 1997. After finishing 2nd in the league for six consecutive seasons between 2006 and 2012, the club then won the title in 4 of the following 5 seasons.

The most notable player to come through the Fury program is former Great Britain international and co-captain Kieron Achara.

== Honours ==
Competition	Number of titles	Years won
Scottish Cup	6	2009-10, 2013-14, 2014-15, 2016-17, 2018-19, 2021-22
National League	6	2000-01, 2012-13, 2013-14, 2014-15, 2016-17, 2019-20
National League Playoffs	2	2014-15, 2016-17

== Home arenas ==
Mariner Centre (1992-2017)
Grangemouth Sports Complex (2017-present)

== Players ==
=== Notable former players ===
Note: Flags indicate national team eligibility at FIBA-sanctioned events. Players may hold other non-FIBA nationalities not displayed.

Criteria

To appear in this section a player must have either:

- Set a club record or won an individual award while at the club
- Played at least one official international match for their national team at any time
- Played at least one official NBA match at any time.

- (Scotland) Kieron Achara
- (Scotland) Alasdair Fraser
- (Scotland) Jonny Bunyan
- (Scotland) Fraser Malcolm
- (Scotland) Pete Duncan
- (Scotland) Keith Bunyan
- (Scotland) Marek Pawlak
- (Scotland) Mark Duncan
- (Scotland) David Wallace
- (Scotland) Steve Hoffman
- (Scotland) Douglas McCormack
- (Scotland) MOJO

== Record in BBL competitions ==
Season	Competition	Round	Opponent	Home	Away
2014–15	BBL Trophy	R1	Glasgow Rocks	L 46-112	
2015–16	BBL Trophy	R1	Glasgow Rocks	L 42-91	
2017–18	BBL Trophy	R1	Loughborough University	L 54-83	

== Season-by-season records ==
Season	Division	Tier	League						Playoffs	Scottish Cup
Season	Division	Tier	Finish	Played	Wins	Losses	Points	Win %	Playoffs	Scottish Cup
Falkirk Fury
1996-97	U23	-	5th	24	10	14	34	0.417		
1997-98	SNBL	2	6th	24	7	17	31	0.292		
Clark Eriksson Fury
1998-99	SNBL	2	4th	27	18	9	45	0.667	Semi-finals	
1999-00	SNBL	2	4th	18	12	6	30	0.667		
2000-01	SNBL	2	1st							
2001-02	SNBL	2	3rd	17	14	3	31	0.824		
2002-03	SNBL	2	4th	18	12	6	30	0.667		Semi-finals
2003-04	SNBL	2	2nd	18	13	5	31	0.722		Runners-up
2004-05	SNBL	2	3rd							Semi-finals
2005-06	SNBL	2								Semi-finals
2006-07	SNBL	2	2nd	15	11	4	26	0.733		Runners-up
2007-08	SNBL	2	2nd	16	12	4	26	0.750		Semi-finals
2008-09	SNBL	2	2nd	20	14	6	34	0.700		Semi-finals
2009-10	SNBL	2	2nd	20	14	6	34	0.700		Winners, beating Edinburgh
2010-11	SNBL	2	2nd	18	16	2	34	0.889	Semi-finals	
2011-12	SNBL	2	2nd	18	16	2	34	0.889	Runners-up	Runners-up
2012-13	SNBL	2	1st	18	17	1	35	0.944	Runners-up	Semi-finals
2013-14	SNBL	2	1st	18	18	0	36	1.000	Semi-finals	Winners, beating St Mirren
2014-15	SNBL	2	1st	22	22	0	44	1.000	Winners, beating Boroughmuir	Winners, beating St Mirren
Sony Centre Fury
2015-16	SBC Div 1	2	5th	18	12	6	30	0.667	Semi-finals	Quarter-finals
2016-17	SBC Div 1	2	1st	18	16	2	34	0.889	Winners, beating Boroughmuir	Winners, beating Boroughmuir
2017-18	SBC Div 1	2	3rd	18	13	5	31	0.722	Semi-finals	Semi-finals
2018-19	SBC Div 1	2	2nd	18	14	4	32	0.778	Runners-up	Winners, beating St Mirren
2019-20	SBC Div 1	2	1st	16	14	2	28	0.875	No playoffs	2nd round
2020–21	SBC Div 1	2	No season							
2021-22	SBC Div 1	2	2nd	16	13	3	29	0.813	Runners-up	Winners, beating Dunfermline
2022-23	SBC Div 1	2	2nd	20	17	3	34	0.850	Runners-up	Quarter-finals
2023-24	SBC Div 1	2	1st	21	19	2	38	0.905	Winners, beating St Mirren	Winners, beating Dunfermline

== See also ==
- Scottish Basketball Championship Men
- Glasgow Rocks
