= City of Edinburgh B.C. =

- League: Men: SBC Division 1 Women: SBC Division 1
- Established: 1988; 38 years ago
- History: Men: Kings; Women: Kool Kats
- Arena: Portobello High School
- Capacity: 200
- Location: Edinburgh, Scotland
- Team colours: / Official website]

City of Edinburgh B.C. is an amateur basketball club based in the Portobello area of Edinburgh, Scotland.

The Kings (Men) and Kool Kats (Women) both compete in their respective Division 1s of the Scottish Basketball Championship, the national basketball league of Scotland.

== Awards ==
In 2007, the City of Edinburgh Basketball Club Committee was awarded the Chairman's Award by Basketball Scotland. The award was given at the 2007 Volunteer Awards held in Perth, Scotland.

The club also picked up four Scottish Cups in 2007: Cadet Women, Junior Men, Junior Women, and Senior Men.

== Kings (Men) ==
=== Honours ===
Competition	Number of titles	Years won
Scottish Cup	8	2001, 2004, 2007, 2008, 2009, 2011, 2013, 2018
National League	9	2003, 2004, 2005, 2007, 2008, 2009, 2010, 2011, 2012
National League Playoffs	5	2011, 2012, 2013, 2018, 2019

=== Season-by-season records ===
Season	Division	Regular Season						Post-Season	Scottish Cup
Season	Division	Finish	Played	Wins	Losses	Points	Win %	Post-Season	Scottish Cup
City of Edinburgh
1988–89	SNL D2								
1989–90	SNL D1	3rd	21	14	7	35	0.667	Runners Up	
1990–91	SNL								Runners Up
1991–92	SNL								Runners Up
1992–93	SNL								Runners Up
1993–94	SNL								
1994–95	SNL								Semi-finals
1995–96	SNL								Semi-finals
1996–97	SNL								Runners Up
1997–98	SNL	3rd	24	20	4	44	0.833	No playoffs	Semi-finals
1998–99	SNL	5th	27	14	13	41	0.519	No playoffs	Runners Up
1999–00	SNL	3rd	18	13	5	31	0.722	Semi-finals	Runners Up
2000–01	SNL	2nd						No playoffs	Winners
2001–02	SNL	2nd						No playoffs	Runners Up
2002–03	SNL	1st	18	17	1	35	0.944	No playoffs	Runners Up
2003–04	SNL	1st	18	18	0	36	1.000	No playoffs	Winners
2004–05	SNL	1st						No playoffs	Runners Up
2005–06	SNL	2nd						No playoffs	Runners Up
2006–07	SNL	1st	15	14	1	29	0.933	No playoffs	Winners
2007–08	SNL	1st	16	15	1	31	0.938	No playoffs	Winners
2008–09	SNL	1st	20	18	2	38	0.900	No playoffs	Winners
2009–10	SNL	1st	20	18	2	38	0.900	No playoffs	Runners Up
2010–11	SNL	1st	18	17	1	35	0.944	Winners	Winners
2011–12	SNL	1st	18	17	1	35	0.944	Winners	Semi-finals
2012–13	SNL	2nd	18	16	2	34	0.889	Winners	Winners
2013–14	SNL	3rd	18	13	5	31	0.722	Semi-finals	Semi-finals
2014–15	SNL D1	5th	22	15	7	37	0.682	Quarter-finals	Semi-finals
2015–16	SBC D1	6th	18	9	9	27	0.500	Quarter-finals	1st round
2016–17	SBC D1	4th	18	13	5	31	0.722	Quarter-finals	Semi-finals
2017–18	SBC D1	2nd	18	14	4	32	0.778	Winners	Winners
2018–19	SBC D1	4th	18	12	6	30	0.667	Winners	Quarter-finals
2019–20	SBC D1	5th	16	9	7	25	0.563	No playoffs	Semi-finals

=== Record in BBL competitions ===
Season	Competition	Home team	H	A	Away team
2006–07	BBL Trophy Pool Stage	3rd in group with 1–2 record			
2012–13	BBL Trophy 1st round	City of Edinburgh Kings	61	72	Glasgow Rocks
2018–19	BBL Trophy 1st round	Newcastle Eagles	129	59	City of Edinburgh Kings

== Kool Kats (Women) ==
=== Honours ===
Competition	Number of titles	Years won
Scottish Cup	9	1994, 2003, 2006, 2009, 2011, 2013, 2014, 2017, 2019
National League	8	1993, 2006, 2009, 2011, 2014, 2015, 2017, 2018
National League Playoffs	3	2011, 2013, 2014
