= List of basketball leagues =

This is a list of current and defunct basketball leagues around the world.

== Men ==
=== Intercontinental ===
- FIBA Intercontinental Cup
- Arab Club Basketball Championship

=== Africa ===
==== International leagues ====
- BAL – Basketball Africa League

==== National leagues ====
Algeria

- ABC Super Division – Algerian Basketball Championship Super Division

Angola

- ABL – Angolan Basketball League – first tier
  - ABC – Angola Second Division Basketball Championship – second tier

Central African Republic

- CABL – Central African Division I Basketball League

Ghana

- GSP Basketball League

Egypt

- EBSL – Egyptian Basketball Super League

Liberia

- LBA League

Libya

- LBL – Libyan Division I Basketball League

Morocco

- Nationale 1

Mozambique

- MBL – Mozambican Division I Basketball League

Nigeria

- NPL – Nigerian Premier League

Rwanda

- NBL – National Basketball League

Senegal

- SBL – Senegalese Division I Basketball League

South Africa

- BNL – Basketball National League

Tunisia

- TBL – Tunisian Division I Basketball League

Uganda

- NBL – National Basketball League

=== Americas ===
==== International leagues ====
- Basketball Champions League Americas (BCLA)
- Liga Sudamericana

==== National leagues ====
Argentina

- LNB – Liga Nacional de Básquet – first tier
  - TNA – Torneo Nacional de Ascenso – second tier

Bolivia

- Libobasquet

Brazil

- CBB – Campeonato Brasileiro de Basquete – first tier
  - NBB – Novo Basquete Brasil – first tier
  - Liga Ouro de Basquete (Brazil) – second tier
    - LDB – Liga de Desenvolvimento de Basquete (Under-22 League) – third tier

Canada

- NBA – National Basketball Association (Toronto Raptors)
  - NBA G League (Raptors 905)
- CEBL – Canadian Elite Basketball League
- BSL – Basketball Super League (North America)

Chile

- LNB – Liga Nacional de Básquetbol de Chile

Colombia

- BPC – Baloncesto Profesional Colombiano

Costa Rica

- LBSCR – Liga de Baloncesto Superior de Costa Rica

Cuba

- LSB – Liga Superior de Baloncesto

Dominican Republic

- LNB – Liga Nacional de Baloncesto

Ecuador

- LEB – Liga Ecuatoriana de Baloncesto

El Salvador

- LSBES – Liga Superior de Baloncesto de El Salvador

Mexico

- LNBP – Liga Nacional de Baloncesto Profesional – first tier
  - CIBACOPA – Circuito de Baloncesto de la Costa del Pacífico – second tier
- NBA G League – first tier Minor League

Nicaragua

- ACB League
- LNB – Liga Nicaragüense de Baloncesto (2018–present)

Panama

- LPB – Liga Profesional de Baloncesto (2015–present)

Paraguay

- LNB – Liga Nacional de Básquetbol

Peru

- LBL – Liga de Basket de Lima
- LNB – Liga Nacional de Basketball

Puerto Rico

- BSN – Baloncesto Superior Nacional
- BSNF – Baloncesto Superior Nacional Femenino

Uruguay

- LUB – Liga Uruguaya de Basketball

United States

- NBA – National Basketball Association
  - NBA G League
- 94x50 – 94x50 League
- ABA – American Basketball Association
- Big3 Basketball
- ECBL – East Coast Basketball League
- FBA – Florida Basketball Association
- MBL – Maximum Basketball League
- NABL – North American Basketball League
- NBL – National Basketball League (United States)
- NNBA – New Nation Basketball Association
- PBA – Pro Basketball Association
- PBL – Premier Basketball League
- SBL - Southern Basketball League
- TBL – The Basketball League
- UBA – Universal Basketball Association
- UBL – United Basketball League
- USBL – United States Basketball League

==== College and university basketball ====
Canada

- OUA – Wilson Cup
- U Sports – W. P. McGee Trophy

United States

- ACCA – Association of Christian College Athletics
- Bible College NIT
- CCCAA – California Community College Athletic Association
- NAIA Division I – NAIA Men's Division I Basketball Championship
  - NAIA Division II – NAIA Men's Division II Basketball Championship
- NCAA Division I – NCAA Men's Division I Basketball Championship
  - NCAA Division II – NCAA Men's Division II Basketball Championship
    - NCAA Division III – NCAA Men's Division III Basketball Championship
- NCCAA – List of NCCAA men's basketball champions
- NIT – National Invitation Tournament
- NJCAA Division I – NJCAA Men's Division I Basketball Championship
  - NJCAA Division II – NJCAA Men's Division II Basketball Championship
    - NJCAA Division III – NJCAA Men's Division III Basketball Championship
- NWAC – Northwest Athletic Conference
- USCAA – United States Collegiate Athletic Association
- NCBBA - National Club Basketball Association

===== Youth leagues =====
- AAU – Amateur Athletic Union
- USSSA – United States Specialty Sports Association

Venezuela

- SPB – Superliga Profesional de Baloncesto
- LPB – Liga Profesional de Baloncesto

=== Asia ===
==== International leagues ====
- Basketball Champions League Asia
- East Asia Super League
- West Asia Super League

==== National leagues ====
Bahrain

- BPL – Bahraini Premier League

China

- CBA – Chinese Basketball Association – first tier
  - NBL – National Basketball League – second tier
    - CUBA – Chinese University Basketball Association – third tier
      - CHBL – China High School Basketball League – fourth tier

Hong Kong

- A1 – Hong Kong A1 Division Championship

India

- NSBL – National Star Basketball League
- INBL - Indian National Basketball League (under-19)
- EPBL – Elite Pro Basketball League (defunct)

Indonesia

- IBL – Indonesian Basketball League

Iran

- IBSL – Iranian Basketball Super League

Iraq

- IBL – Iraqi Professional Basketball League

Kazakhstan

- KBC – Kazakhstan Basketball Championship – first tier
  - KBC – Kazakhstan Basketball Cup – second tier

Kuwait

- KBL – Kuwaiti Division I Basketball League

Japan

- B.League – first tier since 2016–17
  - B.League Division Two – second tier
    - B.League Division Three – third tier
      - AJIBC - All Japan Intercollegiate Basketball Championship – fourth tier

South Korea

- Korean Basketball League - Top tier Basketball League in Korea

Jordan

- JPBL – Jordanian Premier Basketball League - first tier
  - First Division - second tier

Lebanon

- FLB League – Lebanese Basketball League

Malaysia

- MBL – Major Basketball League Malaysia

Mongolia

- The League

Oman

- OBL – Oman Basketball League

Philippines (Philippine basketball is not divided into a tier-like league system)

The Games and Amusements Board (GAB) issues professional licenses for players playing in professional leagues. GAB had instructed amateur leagues that are paying its players to be under its belt. Due to the COVID-19 pandemic, this hasn't been applied as the GAB has only allowed professional leagues (of any sport) to operate.

- Professional leagues
  - AsiaBasket
  - Maharlika Pilipinas Basketball League
  - National Basketball League
  - Philippine Basketball Association
  - Pilipinas Super League
- Amateur leagues:
  - Pinoyliga
  - Sinag Liga Asya
- College basketball (many college leagues also offer high school basketball tournaments):
  - BUCAA – Bulacan Universities and Colleges Athletic Association
  - BUCAL – Bicol Universities and Colleges Athletic League
  - CESAFI – Cebu Schools Athletic Foundation, Inc.
  - COSAA – Cagayan de Oro Schools Athletics Association
  - CUL – Collegiate United League
  - DASAFI – Davao Schools Athletic Foundation, Inc.
  - ISAA – Inter-Scholastic Athletic Association
  - ISSA – Iloilo Schools Sports Association
  - LACUAA – Local Colleges and Universities Athletic Association
  - MCCBL – Metro Cebu Collegiate Basketball League
  - MNCAA – Men's National Collegiate Athletic Association
  - NAASCU – National Athletic Association of Schools, Colleges and Universities
  - NCAA – National Collegiate Athletic Association Basketball Championship
  - NCAA North – National Collegiate Athletic Association – North
  - NCAA South – National Collegiate Athletic Association – South
  - NCRAA – National Capital Region Athletic Association
  - NOPSSCEA – Negros Occidental Private Schools Sports Cultural Educational Association
  - SCUAA – State Colleges and Universities Athletic Association
  - UAAP – University Athletic Association of the Philippines Basketball Championship
  - UCAA – Universities and Colleges Athletic Association
  - UCAL – Universities and Colleges Athletic League
  - UCCL – United Collegiate Championship League
  - UCLAA – United Central Luzon Athletic Association
  - UCPL – Universities & Colleges Premier League
  - WNCAA – Women's National Collegiate Athletic Association
- High school basketball:
  - CESAFI – Cebu Schools Athletic Foundation, Inc.
  - FCAAF – Filipino-Chinese Amateur Athletic Federation
  - ISAA – Inter-Scholastic Athletic Association
  - MCCBL – Metro Cebu Collegiate Basketball League
  - MMTLBA – Metro Manila Tiong Lian Basketball Association
  - NAASCU – National Athletic Association of Schools, Colleges and Universities
  - NBTC – NBTC League
  - NCAA – National Collegiate Athletic Association Basketball Championship
  - NCRAA – National Capital Region Athletic Association
  - PCYAA – Philippine Ching Yuen Athletic Association
  - PRISAA – Private Schools Athletic Association (Philippines)
  - PSAA – Philippine Schools Athletic Association
  - UAAP – University Athletic Association of the Philippines Basketball Championship

Qatar

- QBL – Qatari Basketball League

Saudi Arabia

- SPL – Saudi Premier League

Singapore

- NBL -National Basketball League (Singapore)
- Pro-Am SBL - Pro-Am Singapore Basketball League
- Merlion Cup

South Korea

- KBL – Korean Basketball League – first tier
  - KBL R–League – KBL Reserve League – second tier
    - KUBL – Korean University Basketball League – third tier

Syria

- SBL – Syrian Basketball League

Taiwan

- PLG – P. League+ – professional
- TPBL – Taiwan Professional Basketball League – professional
  - SBL – Super Basketball League – semi-professional
    - A League – amateur
      - UBA – University Basketball Alliance
        - HBL – High School Basketball League

Thailand

- TBL – Thailand Basketball League
- BTL – Basketball Thai League

United Arab Emirates

- NBL – UAE National Basketball League

Vietnam

- VBA – Vietnam Basketball Association

==== College and university basketball ====
Pan-Asian

- AUBL – Asian University Basketball League

China

- CUBA – Chinese University Basketball Association

Indonesia

- LIMA – Liga Mahasiswa

Philippines (many college leagues also offer high school basketball tournaments):

- BUCAA – Bulacan Universities and Colleges Athletic Association
- BUCAL – Bicol Universities and Colleges Athletic League
- CESAFI – Cebu Schools Athletic Foundation, Inc.
- COSAA – Cagayan de Oro Schools Athletics Association
- CUL – Collegiate United League
- DASAFI – Davao Schools Athletic Foundation, Inc.
- ISAA – Inter-Scholastic Athletic Association
- ISSA – Iloilo Schools Sports Association
- LCUAA – Laguna Colleges and Universities Athletic Association
- MNCAA – Men's National Collegiate Athletic Association
- NAASCU – National Athletic Association of Schools, Colleges and Universities
- NCAA – National Collegiate Athletic Association Basketball Championship
- NCAA North – National Collegiate Athletic Association – North
- NCAA South – National Collegiate Athletic Association – South
- NCRAA – National Capital Region Athletic Association
- SCUAA – State Colleges and Universities Athletic Association
- UAAP – University Athletic Association of the Philippines Basketball Championship
- UCAA – Universities and Colleges Athletic Association
- UCAL – Universities and Colleges Athletic League
- UCCL – United Collegiate Championship League
- UCLAA – United Central Luzon Athletic Association
- UCPL – Universities & Colleges Premier League
- WNCAA – Women's National Collegiate Athletic Association

South Korea

- U-League

Taiwan

- UBA – University Basketball Alliance

Vietnam

- NUC – National University Championship

===== Youth leagues =====
China

- CHBL – China High School Basketball League

Indonesia

- DBL – Developmental Basketball League

Philippines

- FCAAF – Filipino-Chinese Amateur Athletic Federation
- MMTLBA – Metro Manila Tiong Lian Basketball Association
- NBTC – NBTC League
- PCYAA – Philippine Ching Yuen Athletic Association
- PRISAA – Private Schools Athletic Association (Philippines)
- PSAA – Philippine Schools Athletic Association

Taiwan

- HBL – High School Basketball League

=== Europe ===
==== International leagues ====
===== Continental Leagues =====
Clubs participate pan-European leagues in two ways. Larger clubs play in Euroleague Basketball's system, with several of them having long-term licenses and others having annual licenses (irrespective of domestic league results), akin to the franchise model in North American sports. The Basketball Champions League (BCL) is the other way clubs participate, which is mostly based on sporting merit. A club usually opts to play in the EuroLeague instead of the BCL if it's eligible for both.

- EuroLeague - organised by EuroLeague Basketball - first tier
  - EuroCup - organised by EuroLeague Basketball - second tier
    - Basketball Champions League - organised by FIBA Europe - third tier
      - FIBA Europe Cup - organised by FIBA Europe - fourth tier
        - European North Basketball League (despite the name, the league is not limited to Northern Europe) - fifth tier

===== Subregional leagues =====
- AAC – Alpe Adria Cup – featuring teams from Austria, Croatia, Czechia (Czech Republic), Hungary, Poland, Romania, Slovakia and Slovenia
- ABA League (also known as the Adriatic League) – first tier league featuring teams from Bosnia and Herzegovina, Croatia, Montenegro, North Macedonia, Serbia and Slovenia
  - ABA League Second Division – second tier
- BIBL – Balkan International Basketball League – featuring teams from Albania, Bulgaria, Israel, Kosovo, Montenegro and North Macedonia
- ENBL – European North Basketball League
- LEBL – Latvian-Estonian Basketball League – featuring teams from Latvia and Estonia
- VTB League – VTB United League – featuring teams from Belarus, Kazakhstan, and Russia

==== National leagues ====
Albania

- ABSL – Albanian Basketball Superliga – first tier
  - ABFD – Albanian Basketball First Division – second tier

Austria

- ABS – Austrian Basketball Superliga – first tier
  - BZL – Basketball Zweite Liga – second tier

Armenia

- ABL – Armenia Basketball League A

Azerbaijan

- ABL – Azerbaijan Basketball League

Belarus

- BPL – Belarusian Premier League (basketball)

Belgium & Netherlands

- BNXT League – first tier in both countries from 2021 to 2022 season onward

Bosnia and Herzegovina

- BCBH – Basketball Championship of Bosnia and Herzegovina – first tier
  - A1 Liga – second tier

Bulgaria

- NBL – National Basketball League

Croatia

- A-1 Liga

Cyprus

- Cyprus Basketball Division 1

Czech Republic

- NBL – National Basketball League, also called the Kooperativa NBL for sponsorship reasons

Denmark

- DBL – Danish Basketball League

Estonia

- KML – Korvpalli Meistriliiga

Finland

- Korisliiga – first tier
  - I Division – second tier

France

- LNB Élite – Ligue Nationale de Basketball Pro A – first tier
  - LNB Pro B – Ligue Nationale de Basket Pro B – second tier

Georgia

- GSL – Georgian Superliga

Germany

- BBL – Basketball Bundesliga – first tier
  - ProA – second tier
    - ProB – third tier

Greece

- GBL – Greek Basket League – first tier
  - GBL A2 – Greek A2 Basket League – second tier
    - GBL B – Greek B Basket League – third tier
      - GBL C – Greek C Basket League – fourth tier

Hungary

- Nemzeti Bajnokság I/A

Iceland

- Premier League
- First Division

Israel

- IBPL – Israeli Basketball Premier League – first tier
  - Liga Leumit – second tier
    - Liga Artzit – third tier

Italy

- Serie A – first tier
  - Serie A2 – second tier
    - Serie B – third tier
      - Serie C Gold – fourth tier
        - Serie C Silver – fifth tier
          - Serie D Regionale – sixth tier
            - Promozione – seventh tier

Kosovo

- KBSL – Kosovo Basketball Superleague – first tier
  - KBFL – Kosovo Basketball First League – second tier

Latvia

- LBL – Latvijas Basketbola līga

Lithuania

- LKL – Lietuvos Krepšinio Lyga – first tier
  - NKL – Nacionalinė Krepšinio Lyga – second tier
    - RKL – Regioninė Krepšinio Lyga – third tier

Luxembourg

- Total League
  - Nationale 2

North Macedonia

- MFL – Macedonian First League

Montenegro

- MBL – Montenegrin Basketball League

Netherlands

- Promotiedivisie – second tier; top purely domestic level from 2021 to 2022

Norway

- BLNO

Poland

- PLK – Polska Liga Koszykówki (Polish Basketball League) – first tier
  - I Liga – second tier
    - II Liga – third tier

Portugal

- LCB – Portuguese Basketball League
  - Proliga - second tier

Romania

- Divizia A

Russia

- VTB–League – VTB United League – first tier since the 2012–13 season (also featuring teams from Belarus & Kazakhstan)
  - BSL 1 – Basketball Super League 1 – second tier; was the first tier league from 1992 to 2010
    - BSL 2 – Basketball Super League 2 – third tier
      - First League – fourth tier
        - VTB-League U21 – fifth tier

Serbia

- BLS – Basketball League of Serbia – first tier
  - BLS B – Basketball League of Serbia B – second tier
    - RBL First Division – Regional Basketball League First Division – third tier
      - RBL Second Division – Regional Basketball League Second Division – fourth tier

Slovakia

- SEL Slovak Extraliga

Slovenia

- 1. A SKL – Premier A Slovenian Basketball League (also known for sponsorship reasons as Liga Telemach) – first tier
  - SSBL – Slovenian Second Basketball League – second tier
    - SBL – School Basketball League – third tier

Spain

- Liga Endesa – first tier
  - Primera FEB – second tier
    - Segunda FEB – third tier
      - Tercera FEB – fourth tier
        - Primera División de Baloncesto – fifth tier

Sweden

- SBL – Swedish Basketball League (Ligan) – first tier
  - Basketettan – second tier

Switzerland

- LNBA – Swiss Basketball League – first tier
  - Championnat LNB – second tier

Turkey

- BSL – Turkish Basketball Super League – first tier
  - TBL – Turkish Basketball First League – second tier
    - TB2L – Turkish Basketball Second League – third tier
      - TRBL – Turkish Regional Basketball League – fourth tier

Ukraine

- UBSL – Ukrainian Basketball Superleague – first tier
  - Higher League – second tier

Ireland

- Super League

Great Britain

- SBL – Super League Basketball – First Tier
  - BCB - British Championship Basketball - second tier

==== College and university basketball ====
Great Britain

- BUCS Premier
  - BUCS Tier 1
    - BUCS Tier 2
      - BUCS Tier 3
        - BUCS Tier 4
          - BUCS Tier 5

==== Youth basketball ====
Great Britain

- EABL - Elite Academy Basketball League
  - CBL - College Basketball League (Tier 2 and Tier 3)

Dynamik National Schools Competition (players registered in any EABL or CBL teams are not permitted to play here except the U17 league)

- U19, U17, U16 Co-Ed Premier, U16 Co-Ed, U14 Co-Ed Premier, U14 Co-Ed

=== Oceania ===
Australia

- NBL – National Basketball League – Major League
  - NBL1 – Minor League
  - Big V – Minor League
  - University Basketball League – Minor League

Guam

- GBA – Guam Basketball Association

New Zealand

- NBL – National Basketball League

== Women ==
=== Africa ===
- FIBA Africa Women's Clubs Champions Cup
- Arab Women's Club Basketball Championship

National leagues

Angola

- AWBL - Angola Women's Basketball League

Morocco

- MWBC - Moroccan Women's Basketball Championship

South Africa

- WNBL - Women's National Basketball League

Tunisia

- Tunisian Women's Division I Basketball League

Nigeria

- ZWBL - Zenith Women Basketball League

=== Americas ===
United States

- Women's National Basketball Association (WNBA)
  - Athletes Unlimited Basketball (AUB)
  - Women's American Basketball Association (WABA)
  - Women's Basketball Development Association (WBDA)
  - Unrivaled (U)

College basketball

- NCAA Division I women's basketball tournament (NCAA Division I Women's)
- NCAA Division II women's basketball tournament (NCAA Division II Women's)
- NCAA Division III women's basketball tournament (NCAA Division III Women's)
- Women's National Invitation Tournament (WNIT)
- NAIA Division I Women's Basketball Championships (NAIA Division I Women's)
- NAIA Division II Women's Basketball Championships (NAIA Division II Women's)
- Association of Christian College Athletics
- NCCAA Women's Basketball (NCCAA Women's)
- NJCAA Division I Women's Basketball Championship (NJCAA Division I Women's)
- NJCAA Division II Women's Basketball Championship (NJCAA Division II Women's)
- NJCAA Division III Women's Basketball Championship (NJCAA Division III Women's)
- USCAA Women's Basketball (USCAA Women's)

Youth leagues

- AAU
- USSSA
- YBOA

Canada

University basketball

- U Sports

Puerto Rico

- Baloncesto Superior Nacional Femenino (BSNF)

=== Asia ===
China

- WCBA - Women's Chinese Basketball Association - first tier
  - WCUBA - Women's Chinese University Basketball Association - second tier

Hong Kong

- WHKBA - Women's Hong Kong Basketball Association

India

- Indian National Basketball Championship for Women

Indonesia

- Srikandi Cup

Japan

- WJBL - Women's Japan Basketball League

Philippines

- WMPBL — Women's Maharlika Pilipinas Basketball League
- WNBL — Women's National Basketball League

Filipino College Basketball

- BUCAA – Bulacan Universities and Colleges Athletic Association
- BUCAL – Bicol Universities and Colleges Athletic League
- CESAFI – Cebu Schools Athletic Foundation, Inc.
- COSAA – Cagayan de Oro Schools Athletics Association
- DASAFI – Davao Schools Athletic Foundation, Inc.
- ISSA – Iloilo Schools Sports Association
- LACUAA – Local Colleges and Universities Athletic Association
- NCAA – National Collegiate Athletic Association Basketball Championship
- NCAA South – National Collegiate Athletic Association – South
- UAAP - University Athletic Association of the Philippines
- WNCAA - Women's National Collegiate Athletic Association
- NAASCU - National Athletic Association of Schools, Colleges and Universities
- NCRAA - National Capital Region Athletic Association
- UCAL – Universities and Colleges Athletic League
- UCLAA – United Central Luzon Athletic Association
- SCUAA – State Colleges and Universities Athletic Association
- UCCL - United Collegiate Championship League

South Korea

- WKBL - Women's Korean Basketball League

Republic of China (Taiwan)

- WSBL - Women's Super Basketball League

Thailand

- WTBL - Women's Thailand Basketball League

=== Europe ===
- EuroLeague
  - EuroCup
  - Europe SuperCup
  - Baltic Women's League

Albania

- Albanian A-1 League

Austria

- AWBB - Austrian Women's Basketball Bundesliga
  - BZWL - Basketball Zweite Women‘s Liga - second tier

Belgium

- BWBL - Belgian Women's Basketball League

Bosnia and Herzegovina

- Basketball Championship of Bosnia and Herzegovina (Women)

Bulgaria

- Bulgarian Women's Basketball Championship

Croatia

- Prva ženska liga - Croatian First Women's Basketball League

Cyprus

- Cyprus Women's Basketball Division A
  - Kadınlar Basketbol Ligi - Women's Basketball League

Czech Republic

- Česká ženská basketbalová liga - Czech Women's Basketball League

Denmark

- Women's Danish Basketball League

France

- LFB – Ligue Féminine de Basketball

Estonia

- WKML - Women's Korvpalli Meistriliiga

Finland

- Naisten Korisliiga

Germany

- Women's Basketball Bundesliga
  - 2. Women‘s Basketball Bundesliga - second tier

Greece

- Greek Women's Basket - first tier
  - Greek A2 Women's Basket - second tier

Hungary

- Nemzeti Bajnokság I/A for Women's

Iceland

- Úrvalsdeild kvenna - Premier league women

Israel

- Israeli Female Basketball Premier League

Italy

- LegA Basket Femminile Serie A1 - first tier
  - Serie A2 - second tier
    - Serie B d'Eccellenza - third tier

Latvia

- Latvijas Sieviešu basketbola līga

Lithuania

- LMKL - Lithuanian Women's Basketball League

Luxembourg

- Total League - Dames

North Macedonia

- First Women's Basketball League of Macedonia

Montenegro

- First A Women's Basketball League of Montenegro

Netherlands

- Vrouwen Basketball League

Poland

- BLK – Basket Liga Kobiet (first tier)
  - I Liga (second tier)

Portugal

- LFB - Premier Women's Basketball League

Romania

- Divizia A

Russia

- Russian Women's Basketball Premier League
  - Superleague
    - Higher League

Serbia

- Adriatic League
  - First Women's Basketball League of Serbia

Slovakia

- Slovak Women's Basketball Extraliga

Slovenia

- Slovenian Women's Basketball League

Spain

- LFB – Liga Femenina de Baloncesto Ligue Féminine de Basketball
  - LF2B - Liga Femenina 2 de Baloncesto Ligue Féminine 2 de Basketball

Sweden

- Basketligan dam

Switzerland

- Swiss Women's Basketball Championship

Turkey

- TWBL - Turkish Women's Basketball League

Ukraine

- UWBSL, Ukrainian Women's Basketball SuperLeague

United Kingdom

- WBBL - Women's British Basketball League
  - EWBL - English Women's Basketball League
  - SWNL - Scottish Women's National League

=== Oceania ===
Australia

- WNBL – Women's National Basketball League – Major League
  - NBL1 – Minor League
  - Big V – Minor League
  - University Basketball League – Minor League

New Zealand

- Tauihi Basketball Aotearoa

== Defunct leagues ==
=== Men ===
==== World ====
- McDonald's Championship, 1987–1999

==== Africa ====
- FIBA Africa Clubs Champions Cup, (1972–2019)

==== Americas ====
- FIBA Americas League, (2007–2019)
- Campeonato Panamericano de Clubes de Básquetbol, (1993–2000)

Subregional Leagues

- Campeonato Sudamericano de Clubes, (1946–2008)
- Liga Centroamericana de clubes de baloncesto, (2014–2018)

National Leagues

Canada

- National Basketball League (NBL), 1993–94
- Canadian National Basketball League (CNBL), 2002–2004
- National Basketball League of Canada (NBLC). 2011–2023

United States

- Amateur Athletic Association Basketball (AAU), 1897–1982
- National Basketball League (NBL), 1898–99 to 1903–04
- Philadelphia Basketball League (PBL), 1902–1909
- New England Basketball League (NEBL), 1903–1904
- Western Massachusetts Basketball League (WMBL), 1903–1904
- Western Pennsylvania Basketball League (WPBL), 1903–1904; 1912–1913; 1914–1915
- New England Basketball Association (NEBA), 1904–1905
- Mohawk Valley League (MVL), 1906–1910
- Central Basketball League (CBL), 1906–1912
- Hudson River League (HRL), 1909–12
- Eastern Basketball League (EBL), 1909–1933
- New York State League (NYSL), 1911–23
- Pennsylvania State League (PSL), 1914–1921
- Interstate Basketball League (IBL), 1915–1920
- Interstate League (IL), 1919–1923
- Metropolitan Basketball League (MBL), 1921–1928
- American Basketball League (ABL), 1925–1955
- National Basketball League (NBL), 1926–27
- National Basketball League (NBL), 1929–30
- National Basketball League (NBL), 1932–33
- Midwest Basketball Conference (MBC), 1935–1937; became National Basketball League with 1937–38 season.
- National Basketball League (NBL), 1937–1949; merged with the Basketball Association of America to become the National Basketball Association.
- World Professional Basketball Tournament (WPBT), 1939–1948
- Eastern Pro League (EPL)
- Pacific Coast Professional Basketball League (PCPBL), 1946–1948
- Basketball Association of America (BAA), 1946–1949; merged with the National Basketball League to become the National Basketball Association.
- New York State Professional Basketball League (NYSPL), 1946–1949
- Continental Basketball Association (CBA), 1946–2009; originally named Eastern Pennsylvania Basketball League, then Eastern Professional Basketball League.
- Professional Basketball League of America (PBLA), 1947–1948
- National Industrial Basketball League (NIBL), 1947–1961
- National Professional Basketball League (NPBL), 1950–1951
- American Basketball League (ABL), 1961–1963
- Midwest Professional Basketball League (MPBL) (1961–1964)
- North American Basketball League (1964-1968), (NABL) 1964–1968
- American Basketball Association (ABA), 1967–1976, Merged with NBA, four teams now in NBA.
- All-American Basketball Alliance (AABA), 1977–78
- Western Basketball Association (WBA), 1978–79
- World Basketball League (WBL), 1988–1992; was founded as the International Basketball Association in November 1987, before changing its name prior to the 1988 season.
- Global Basketball Association (GBA), 1991-92 - December 1992; league folded midway through 1992–93 season.
- International Basketball Association (IBA), 1995–2001
- International Basketball League (IBL), 1999–2001
- National Rookie League (NRL), 2000
- All-American Professional Basketball League (AAPBL), 2005
- United States Basketball League (USBL)
- National Professional Basketball League (NPBL)
- All-American Basketball Alliance (2010)
- Global Professional Basketball League (GPBL)
- Global Professional Basketball League 2 (GPBL 2)
- United Regions Basketball League (URBL)
- National Alliance Basketball League (NABL)
- National Athletic Basketball League (NABL)
- Universal Basketball League (UBL)
- Minor League Basketball Association (MLBA)
- Continental Basketball League (CBL)
- American Basketball League (ABL)
- Eastern Basketball Alliance (EBA)
- West Coast Pro Basketball League (WCBL)
- International Basketball League (IBL)

==== Asia ====
Subregional Leagues

- ABL – ASEAN Basketball League, (2009–2023)
- WABA – WABA Champions Cup, (1998–2019)

National Leagues

China

- Chinese New Basketball Alliance (CNBA), 1996–97
- Chinese University Basketball Super League (CUBS), 2004–15

India

- UBA Pro Basketball League, 2015–17

Japan

- bj league - Basketball Japan League, 2005–16
- JBL - Japan Basketball League, 2007–2013
  - NBL - National Basketball League, 2013–16

Malaysia

- MNBL - Malaysia National Basketball League, 1981–2013

Philippines

- Philippine Basketball League (PBL), 1983–2011
- Manila Industrial and Commercial Athletic Association (MICAA), 1938–1981
- Metropolitan Basketball Association (MBA), 1998–2002
- Liga Pilipinas (LP), 2008–2011
- PBA D-League, 2011–2024
- United Regional Basketball League (URBL), 2004–2005

Republic of China (Taiwan)

- Chinese Basketball Alliance (CBA), 1995–1999
- T1 League, 2021–2024

==== Europe ====
Subregional leagues

- BBL – Baltic Basketball League - teams from the Baltic states of Estonia, Latvia and Lithuania plus Sweden
- CEBL – Central European Basketball League

National leagues

Austria

- ÖBB – Austrian Basketball Bundesliga replaced by the Austrian Basketball Superliga

Belgium

- Pro Basketball League (PBL), 1925–2021; replaced by the BNXT League

Great Britain

- National Basketball League (NBL), 1972–2003

Netherlands

- Dutch Basketball League (DBL), 1960–2021; replaced by the BNXT League

Russia

- Professional Basketball League (PBL), 2010–2013; superseded by the VTB United League

Former Yugoslavia

- Yugoslav Basketball League

==== Oceania ====
Australia

- Australian Basketball Association (ABA), 1965–2008
- South East Australian Basketball League (SEABL), 1981–2018

New Zealand

- Conference Basketball League (CBL), 1981–2010

=== Women ===
==== Americas ====
United States

- Women's Professional Basketball Association (WPBA), 1975; the league folded before it ever started.
- Women's Professional Basketball League (WBL), 1978–1981
- Ladies Professional Basketball Association (LPBA), 1980–81; formed as a rival league to the WBL when the WBL began to experience financial problems. The league was poorly organized and played only five (or seven) games before disbanding with three teams never playing a game.
- Women's American Basketball Association (WABA), 1984
- National Women's Basketball Association (NWBA), 1986; the league folded right before the season was supposed to start.
- Liberty Basketball Association (LBA), 1991; played one pre-season exhibition game on February 10, 1991, before disbanding.
- Women's Basketball Association (WBA), 1993–1995
- American Basketball League (ABL), 1996–1998
- National Women's Basketball League (NWBL), 1998–2007
- Women's American Basketball Association (WABA), 2002
- Women's Minor League Basketball Association (WMLBA), 2016–2020

==== Asia ====
China

- Women's Chinese University Basketball Super League (WCUBS), 2004–15

Philippines

- Pinay Ballers League (2014–2018)
- Women's Philippine Basketball League (WPBL)

==== Oceania ====
Australia

- Australian Basketball Association (ABA), 1965–2008
- South East Australian Basketball League (SEABL), 1981–2018

New Zealand

- Women's Basketball Championship (WBC)
