= University Basketball League =

University Basketball League may refer to:

- University Basketball League Australia, basketball league in Australia
- U-League (basketball), basketball league in South Korea previously known as Korean University Basketball League
- Chinese University Basketball Association, basketball league in China that merged with Chinese University Basketball Super League

== See also ==
- List of basketball leagues
