= 2018–19 Scottish Basketball Championship Women season =

2018–19 SBC Women season
- League: Scottish Basketball Championship Women
- Sport: Basketball
- Number of teams: 9

Regular-season

SBC Competitions

SBC seasons
- ← 2017–18 2019–20 →

The 2018–19 season of the Scottish Basketball Championship Women, the national women's basketball league of Scotland.

== Format ==
Each team plays each other twice, once home, once away, for a total of 16 games.

== Results ==
=== Regular season ===
Pos	Team	Pld	W	L	GF	GA	GD	Pts	
1	Lady Rocks	16	15	1	1034	700	+334	31	League Champions
2	St Mirren	16	13	3	976	749	+227	29	
3	Edinburgh University	16	11	5	955	759	+196	27	
4	City of Edinburgh Kool Kats	16	11	5	1141	762	+379	27	
5	Glasgow Fever	16	9	7	875	780	+95	25	
6	Sony Centre Fury	16	7	9	871	830	+41	23	
7	Glasgow University	16	3	13	604	916	−312	19	
8	West Lothian Wolves	16	3	13	588	1093	−505	19	
9	Polonia Phoenix	16	0	16	521	976	−455	16	

Source: Basketball Scotland

=== Playoffs ===
Quarter-finals

Lady Rocks	W–c	West Lothian Wolves

8 Mar 2019

St Mirren	79–38	Glasgow University

9 Mar 2019

City of Edinburgh Kool Kats	74–41	Glasgow Fever

9 Mar 2019

Edinburgh University	83–67	Sony Centre Fury

Semi-finals

17 Mar 2019

St Mirren	73–64	Edinburgh University

17 Mar 2019

Lady Rocks	56–53	City of Edinburgh Kool Kats

Final

31 Mar 2019

Lady Rocks	65–49	St Mirren

Oriam, Edinburgh

=== Scottish Cup ===
1st Round

30 Sep 2018

St Mirren	45–43	Lady Rocks

Quarter-finals

3 Nov 2018

Polonia Phoenix	43–104	Edinburgh University

7 Nov 2018

St Mirren	57–64	Glasgow Fever

Sony Centre Fury	W–c	Glasgow University

West Lothian Wolves	c–W	City of Edinburgh Kool Kats

Semi-finals

8 Dec 2018

City of Edinburgh Kool Kats	66–51	Sony Centre Fury

6 Dec 2018

Glasgow Fever	37–55	Edinburgh University

Final

3 Feb 2019

City of Edinburgh Kool Kats	64–58	Edinburgh University

Oriam, Edinburgh

Preceded by 2017–18 season	SBC seasons 2018–19	Succeeded by 2019–20 season
