= 2017–18 Scottish Basketball Championship Women season =

2017–18 SBC Women season
- League: Scottish Basketball Championship Women
- Sport: Basketball
- Number of teams: 11

Regular Season

SBC Competitions

SBC seasons
- ← 2016–17 2018–19 →

The 2017–18 season of the Scottish Basketball Championship Women, the national women's basketball league of Scotland.

== Format ==
In Premier Division, each team plays each other Premier Division team twice, once home once away, and each Division 1 team once, home or away, for a total of 15 games.
In Division 1, each team plays each other Division 1 team twice, once home once away, and each Premier Division team once, home or away, for a total of 14 games.

== Results ==
=== Premier Division ===
Pos	Team	Pld	W	L	GF	GA	GD	Pts	
1	City of Edinburgh Kool Kats	15	13	2	1080	763	+317	28	League Champions
2	Lady Rocks	15	10	5	976	852	+124	25	
3	Edinburgh University	15	10	5	854	647	+207	25	
4	Tayside Musketeers	15	8	7	868	811	+57	23	
5	Sony Centre Fury	15	7	8	745	779	−34	22	
6	Polonia Phoenix	15	2	13	700	1013	−313	17	

Source: Basketball Scotland

=== Division 1 ===
Pos	Team	Pld	W	L	GF	GA	GD	Pts
1	St Mirren	14	13	1	971	716	+255	27
2	Glasgow Fever	14	9	5	815	678	+137	21
3	St Andrews University	14	5	9	564	688	−124	19
4	Glasgow University	14	2	12	518	807	−289	16
5	West Lothian Wolves	14	1	13	570	907	−337	15

Source: Basketball Scotland

=== Playoffs ===
Quarter-finals

City of Edinburgh Kool Kats	84–57	Polonia Phoenix

Edinburgh University	70–41	Sony Centre Fury

Tayside Musketeers	53–56	St Mirren

Lady Rocks	71–55	Glasgow Fever

Semi-finals

Lady Rocks	60–66	Edinburgh University

City of Edinburgh Kool Kats	74–65	St Mirren;

Final

City of Edinburgh Kool Kats	51–75	Edinburgh University

Preceded by 2016–17 season	SBC seasons 2017–18	Succeeded by 2018–19 season
