= Macedonian Women's Basketball Cup =

- Sport: Basketball
- Founded: 1992
- No. of teams: 8
- Country: North Macedonia (1992–present)
- Continent: FIBA Europe (Europe)
- Most recent champion: Vardar (1st title)
- Most titles: Badel 1862 (12th title)

The Macedonian Women's Basketball Cup is the national women's basketball cup of North Macedonia. It has been played for since 1992.

== Cup winners ==
Season	Winner	Result	Runner-up
1992–93	Vigor		
1993–94			
1994–95			
1995–96	Vigor		
1996–97			
1997–98	Vigor		
1998–99			
1999–00			
2000–01	Vigor		
2001–02			
2002–03			
2003–04			
2004–05			
2005–06			
2006–07	Vigor	72:51	Biljana 006
2007–08	Vigor	73:67	Izgradba Komerc Mladinec
2008–09	Vigor	87:54	Skopje Biljana
2009–10	Vigor		
2010–11			
2011–12	Vigor	65:57	Klubski
2012–13	Klubski	69:59	Krosig
2013–14	Badel 1862	77:57	Krosig
2014–15	Badel 1862	63:52	Lotos
2015–16	Badel 1862	88:58	Lotos
2016–17	WBC Vardar	69:65	Badel 1862
