= José Luis Dámaso Martinez =

Spanish basketball player and coach (born 1974)

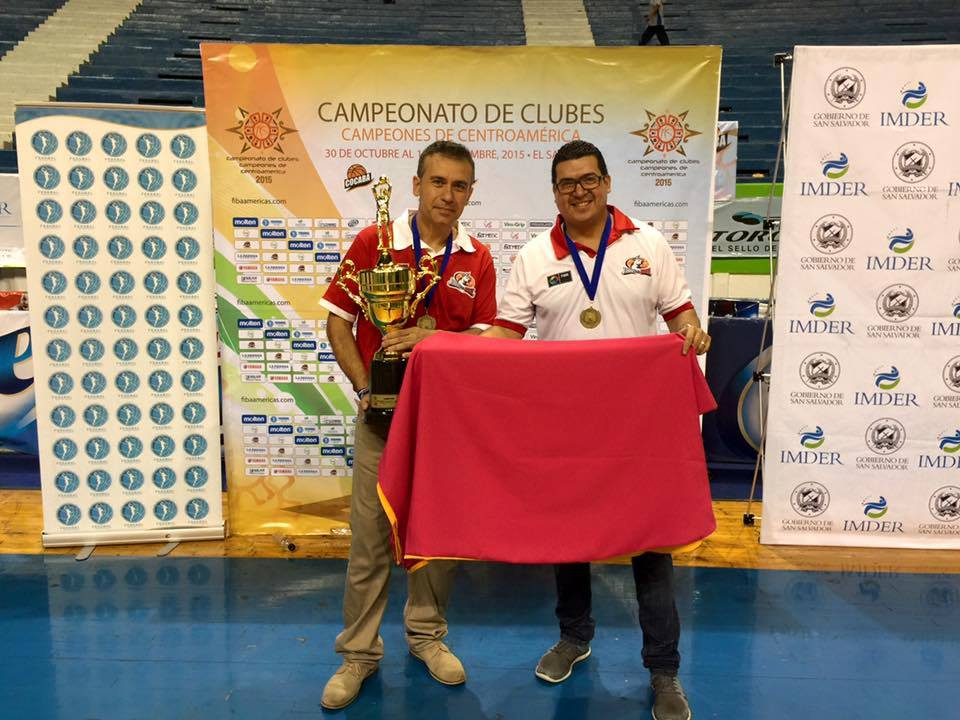
- Dámaso holding the FIBA COCABA Championship trophy circa 2015.

Jesuitas CD Valencia
- Position: Head coach
- League: FBCV

Personal information
- Born: 14 May 1974 (age 52) Valencia, Spain
- Listed height: 6 ft 0 in (1.83 m)
- Listed weight: 198 lb (90 kg)
- Coaching career: 1992–present

Career history
- 1992-2000: C.D. Nazaret (Valencia, España)
- 2001-2006 2010-2011: C. A. B. A. (Albacete, España)
- 2005-2009: Albacete Baloncesto Cinco (Albacete, España)
- 2012-2013 2013-2015: Albacete Basket (Albacete, España) Selección Castilla La Mancha
- 2014-2015: CB Madrigueras (Albacete, España) Fundación Real Madrid
- 2015-16: Toros del Norte (Matagalpa, Nicaragua)
- 2016: Nicaragua National Team Trini"s (La Trinidad, Nicaragua)
- 2017: Guatemala National Team
- 2018-2019: AD Isidro Metapán (Metapán, El Salvador)
- 2019-2020 2022: Quezaltepeque BC (Quezaltepeque, El Salvador)
- 2021: LMMR (Santa Ana, El Salvador)
- 2023: Brujos Izalco (Izalco, El Salvador)
- 2025-...: Jesuitas CD (Valencia, España)

Career highlights
- LMB. Champion Torneo Relámpago, Champion Cup, runner-up League 2023.; LMB Female. Runner-up 2021.; LMB El Salvador. Runner-up Torneo Apertura 2019; LMB El Salvador. Runner-up Torneo Clausura 2019.; Coach All Star ACB Nicaragua 2016.; ACB League Nicaragua. Runner-up 2016.; Coach All Star ACB Nicaragua and Coach of the year 2015.; FIBA COCABA Championship winner (2015); ACB League champion (2015); Copa Igualdad champion (2011); FBCLM champion 1a female (2011); FBCLM runner-up junior (2006); FBCLM Champion 1a Division (2005); FBCLM 1a Autonómica champion (2004)

José Luis Dámaso Martinez (born 14 May 1974) is a Spanish international professional basketball coach. He has coached professionally in Spain, Nicaragua, Guatemala and recently in El Salvador.

He is most known for winning a championship in the ACB League of Nicaragua with Toros del Norte in 2015 and his team's subsequent victory in the FIBA COCABA Championship

He has also served as the head coach of the Guatemalan male and female national teams for the Central American Games and Centrobasket in 2017.

== Early life ==
Dámaso was born in Valencia, Spain on 14 May 1974.

== Coaching career ==
=== Spain ===
Dámaso began his professional career with Club Deportivo Nazaret (Valencia) first as a player and then as an eventual coach from 1992 - 1997. Afterwards he had a 14-year tenure with Albacete under its various club affiliates (C.A.B.A, CB Cinco y Albacete Basket).

In the 2014 – 2015, Dámaso joined Fundacion Real Madrid before continuing his coaching career in Central America.

In the Spanish coaching ranks, Dámaso is most known for his time spent with Caja Rural de Albacete C.A.B.A – a third division female team competing out of LEB Plata. There, his team won a match 206-20 against CB Villarrobledo – a Spanish national record for margin of victory that stood for many years.

=== Nicaragua ===
In 2015, Dámaso accepted a contract to coach Toros del Norte in the ACB League of Nicaragua. The team finished 15-3 (win-loss) in league play, defeating Leones de Managua in the finals, 4-1.

With the victory, the team was invited to participate in the FIBA COCABA Championship - where the club prevailed, winning the regional club tournament held in El Salvador that year. Toros del Norte was then invited to compete in The FIBA Americas League - a tournament consisting of the 16 best club teams in the Americas.

In the following 2016 season, Dámaso joined Trini's de La Trinidad (Esteli) of the ACB League of Nicaragua. The team finished first in league-play at 16-5 (win-loss) and qualified for the championship finals. However they were eliminated by third-seeded Tiburones Movistar in the final round, 3-1.

Despite the loss, Dámaso and Esteli were still invited to participate in the 2016 FIBA COCABA Championship.

=== El Salvador ===
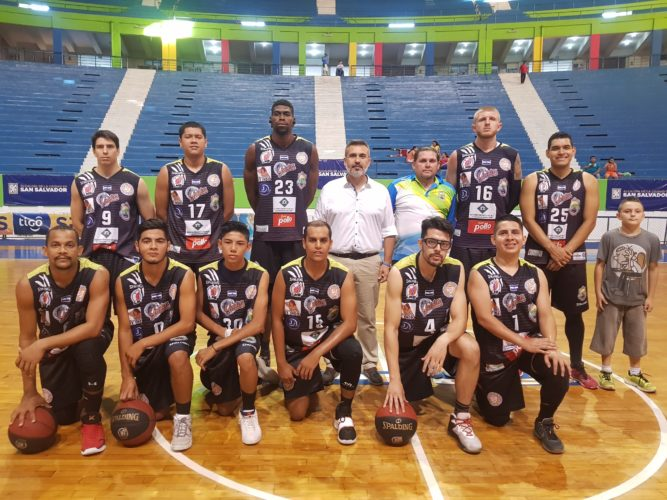
Dámaso posing with his team, A.D. Isidro Metapan, prior to a league game in La Liga Mayor de Baloncesto in El Salvador circa 2018.

In 2018, Damaso signed a contract with A.D. Isidro Metapan playing out of La Liga Mayor de Baloncesto in El Salvador – becoming the first Spanish coach in league history.

In his first year the club was eliminated 3-1 in the first round of the LMB playoffs against fourth-seeded Brujos de Izalco however in his second season, A.D. Isidro Metapan made its second finals appearance in team history, ultimately losing to Santa Tecla.

Following the season, Damaso signed with Quezaltepeque Basketball Club.

In 2020 Damaso returned to coaching women's basketball by taking the head coaching position with Liga Municipal Monsenor Romero based out of Santa Ana, El Salvador. The team competes in La Liga Mayor de Baloncesto Femenino.

== International career ==
=== Guatemala ===
In 2017, alongside fellow Spaniard Angel Fernández, Dámaso and Fernández combined to coach the men's and women's Guatemalan national teams for the 2017 Central American Games in Managua, Nicaragua as well as the women's national team for the 2017 Centrobasket in Saint Thomas, U.S. Virgin Islands, respectively.

In that same year the Guatemalan Basketball Federation offered Dámaso full control of both squads for a three-four year development project meant to last beyond the 2020 Summer Olympics in Tokyo, Japan.
