= AABA =

AABA may refer to:

- AABA form, a musical form common in Tin Pan Alley songs
- All-American Basketball Alliance, a defunct basketball league
- All-American Basketball Alliance (2010), an unrelated all-white basketball league announced in 2010
- alpha-Aminobutyric acid, an isomer of the amino acid aminobutyric acid
- Altaba ticker symbol
- Rhyme scheme of the Rubaʿi, a type of Persian poem, also known as "Rubaiyat Quatrain"

== See also ==
- Aaba, a village in the Koura District of Lebanon
