= 2024–25 First Women's Basketball League of North Macedonia =

Women's basketball league in North Macedonia

First Women's Basketball League of North Macedonia
- Season: 2024–25
- Dates: Regular season: 12 October 2024 – 6 April 2025; Play Ins and Play Offs: 9 April – 21 May 2025
- Teams: 13

Finals
- Champions: Basket Kam 2011 (4th title)
- Runners-up: Kriva Palanka
- Finals MVP: (North Macedonia) Ivana Kmetovska

The 2024–25 First Women's Basketball League of North Macedonia is the 34th season of the top division women's basketball league in North Macedonia since its establishment in 1992. It starts in October 2024 with the first round of the regular season and ends in May 2025.

Basket Kam 2011 are the defending champions.

Basket Kam 2011 won their fourth title after beating Kriva Palanka in the final.

== Format ==
The teams were split into two groups, an upper group and a lower group. In the upper group, teams played each other twice where the top six reached the play offs. In the lower group, teams played each other twice where the top two teams would advance to a play in with the seventh and eighth placed teams in the upper group (however only one play off took place due to withdrawals). The quarterfinals and semifinals were played as a best of three series while the final was a best of five series.

== Regular season ==
=== Group A ===
Pos	Team	Pld	W	L	PF	PA	PD	Pts	Qualification
1	Basket Kam 2011	12	11	1	893	652	+241	23 (Note: Basket Kam 2011 131–121 Kriva Palanka)	Play Offs
2	Kriva Palanka	12	11	1	1081	819	+262	23	Play Offs
3	Vardar	12	7	5	886	790	+96	19	Play Offs
4	Badel 1862	12	7	5	857	801	+56	19	Play Offs
5	MZT Skopje Airport	12	2	10	759	894	−135	14 (Note: MZT Skopje Airport 1–1, +69 PD; Patriot 2016 1–1, –29 PD; Probasket Akademija 1–1, –40 PD)	Play Offs
6	Patriot 2016	12	2	10	712	954	−242	14	Play Offs
7	Probasket Akademija	12	2	10	684	962	−278	14	Play In
8	Grizli (Note: Grizli were disqualified after failing to appear for two consecutive matches.)	0	0	0	0	0	0	0	Withdrew

Source: First Women's Basketball League of North Macedonia
Rules for classification: 1) Points; 2) Points difference; 3) Points scored.

=== Group B ===
Pos	Team	Pld	W	L	PF	PA	PD	Pts	Qualification
1	LCC Sport Tim Negotino	10	9	1	771	443	+328	19	Play Offs and Promotion
2	Struga 2009	10	8	2	589	507	+82	18	Play In
3	RCC Shkupi	10	5	5	457	491	−34	15	
4	Ohrid	10	4	6	443	503	−60	14	
5	Gostizar 2009	10	2	8	456	630	−174	12	
6	Rinia Basket (Note: Rinia Basket were deducted point by the federation.)	10	2	8	478	620	−142	11	
7	Janbor (Note: Janbor withdrew in November 2024.)	0	0	0	0	0	0	0	Withdrew
8	Ponikva (Note: Ponikva withdrew in November 2024.)	0	0	0	0	0	0	0	Withdrew

Source: First Women's Basketball League of North Macedonia
Rules for classification: 1) Points; 2) Points difference; 3) Points scored.

== Play offs ==
=== Play in ===
Semifinal play in
Probasket Akademija	80	67	147
Struga 2009	60	51	111

=== Main bracket ===
Quarterfinals
1	Basket Kam 2011	80	80	160
8	LCC Sport Tim Negotino	41	38	79
4	Vardar	79	0	79
5	MZT Skopje Airport (Note: MZT Skopje Airport won the tie after Vardar forfeited the return leg.)	54	20	74
2	Kriva Palanka	97	87	184
7	Probasket Akademija	57	69	126
3	Badel 1862	81	60	141
6	Patriot 2016	38	31	69

Semifinals
1	Basket Kam 2011	74	77	2
4	MZT Skopje Airport	42	60	0
2	Kriva Palanka	89	82	80	2
3	Badel 1862	63	83	55	1

Final
1	Basket Kam 2011	66	87	67	3
2	Kriva Palanka	47	74	49	0

Champions of North Macedonia

Basket Kam 2011
Fourth title
