= Kadınlar Basketbol Ligi =

- Current season, competition or edition: 2017–18 Kadınlar Basketbol Ligi
- Sport: Basketball
- No. of teams: 4
- Country: Northern Cyprus
- Most recent champion: Gönyeli S.K.
- Broadcaster: BRT
- Sponsor: Commercial Insurance
- Level on pyramid: 1st
- Domestic cup: Federasyon Kupası
- Website: Büyük Kadınlar Ligi

The Kadınlar Basketbol Ligi (English: Women's Basketball League) or the Commercial Insurance Basketbol Kadınlar Ligi is a Women's Basketball League in Northern Cyprus. It is run by the Turkish Cypriot Basketball Federation.

== Current teams ==
Team	District	Venue
Girne Amerikan Üniversitesi	Girne	Ertuğrul Apakan Spor Salonu
Koop Spor	Lefkoşa	Atatürk Spor Salonu
Soyer	Lefke	Atatürk Spor Salonu^{1}
Yakın Doğu Üniversitesi	Lefkoşa	NEU RA 25 Spor Salonu

^{1}Soyer Spor Kulübü is a Lefke-based team playing their home games at the Atatürk Spor Salonu, Nicosia.

== Recent champions ==
- 2008–09 – Yakın Doğu Üniversitesi
- 2009–10 – Yakın Doğu Üniversitesi
- 2010–11 – Yakın Doğu Üniversitesi
- 2011–12 – Yakın Doğu Üniversitesi
- 2012–16 – not played
- 2016–17 – Gönyeli
- 2017–18 – ongoing
