= 2019–20 Scottish Basketball Championship Women season =

2019–20 SBC Women season
- League: Scottish Basketball Championship Women
- Sport: Basketball
- Number of teams: 9

Regular-season

SBC Competitions

SBC seasons
- ← 2018–19 2021–22 →

The 2019–20 season of the Scottish Basketball Championship Women, the national women's basketball league of Scotland.

== Format ==
In Division 1, each team plays each other twice, once home, once away, for a total of 16 games.

== Results ==
=== Regular season ===
Pos	Team	Pld	W	L	GF	GA	GD	Pts	
1	Lady Rocks	16	15	1	1211	775	+436	31	League Champions
2	City of Edinburgh Kool Kats	16	13	3	1157	840	+317	29	
3	St Mirren	16	12	4	1133	792	+341	28	
4	Perth Phoenix	16	9	7	844	819	+25	25	
5	Edinburgh University	16	7	9	984	904	+80	23	
6	Glasgow Fever	16	6	10	720	910	−190	22	
7	Sony Centre Fury	16	6	10	864	953	−89	22	
8	West Lothian Wolves	16	3	13	767	1168	−401	19	
9	Glasgow University	16	1	15	540	1059	−519	16	

Source: http://basketballscotland.co.uk/league/139397/

=== Scottish Cup ===
1st Round

4 Oct 2018

St Mirren	66–38	West Lothian Wolves

6 Oct 2018

Sony Centre Fury	47–44	Edinburgh University

Quarter-finals

10 Nov 2019

Perth Phoenix	62–79	Lady Rocks

10 Nov 2019

St Mirren	61–38	Glasgow Fever

13 Nov 2019

Dunfermline Reign	38–80	Sony Centre Fury

Glasgow University	C–W	City of Edinburgh Kool Kats

Semi-finals

6 Dec 2019

Sony Centre Fury	46–64	City of Edinburgh Kool Kats

8 Dec 2019

St Mirren	57–63	Lady Rocks

Final

1 Feb 2020

City of Edinburgh Kool Kats	58–64	Lady Rocks

Preceded by 2018–19 season	SBC seasons 2019–20	Succeeded by 2020–21 season
