= Women's Minor League Basketball Association =

- Sport: Basketball
- Founded: April 8, 2016
- First season: 2017
- President: Kre’Tonia Morgan
- Commissioner: Janell Burse
- Motto: It’s Our Time
- No. of teams: 8
- Country: United States
- Continent: Americas
- Most recent champion: Dallas Lightning
- Most titles: Dallas Lightning (3)

The Women's Minor League Basketball Association (WMLBA) was a women's professional basketball league in North America. It was initially founded in 2016, although the initial playing season began in 2017. The season ran from June through August.

== History ==
In 2015, Janell Burse and Kre’Tonia Morgan formed the Women's Minor League Basketball Association. Burse acted as the WMLBA Commissioner. The Louisiana native played four years for Tulane University before her pro career with the Minnesota Lynx and Seattle Storm of the WNBA, and Wisla Can-Pack Kraków in Poland. A native of Mississippi, Morgan was the President of Business Operations.

The league initially planned to begin play in 2016, but the first season of competition was in 2017. The regular season began in June culminating in a championship game in August between the Tennessee Storm and the Dallas Lightning, won by Dallas 76–71.

The league announced on January 3, 2020, that it was ceasing operations.

== Teams ==
Current teams
Team	City	Joined WMLBA
Carolina Stars	Columbia, SC	2017
Dallas Lightning	Dallas, TX	2017
Georgia Classic	Evans, GA	2017
Houston Galaxy	Houston, TX	2017
Nashville Charge	Nashville, TN	2017
Oklahoma Warriors	Muskogee, OK	2019
San Antonio Troopers	San Antonio, TX	2017
Tennessee Storm	Jackson, TN	2017

=== Former member teams ===
- Fort Worth Elite (2018)
- Midwest Reign (2017)

== Champions ==
WMLBA championship history
Season	Champion	Runner-up	Result
2017	Dallas Lightning	Tennessee Storm	76-71
2018	Dallas Lightning	San Antonio Troopers	77-70
2019	Dallas Lightning	Oklahoma Warriors	113-62
