= 2024–25 Women's Korvpalli Meistriliiga =

Women's basketball league in Estonia

Women's Korvpalli Meistriliiga
- Season: 2024–25
- Dates: Regular season: 25 September 2024 – 7 March 2025; Play Offs: 19 March – 25 April 2025
- Teams: 9

Regular season
- Season MVP: (Estonia) Katriin Juurik

Finals
- Champions: TSA/CITYTEED Tallinn (1st title)
- Runners-up: Audentes/Tallinn University
- Finals MVP: (Estonia) Sofia Kosareva

Statistical leaders
Points	(Finland) Carolina Rahkonen	18.6
Rebounds	(Estonia) Kadri Uiga	11.0
Assists	(Estonia) Eliise Pajumets	5.9
Steals	(Estonia) Katlin Murre	4.1
Blocks	(Estonia) Katariina Rongelep	3.9

The 2024–25 Women's Korvpalli Meistriliiga is the 34th season of the top division women's basketball league in Estonia since its establishment in 1991. It starts in September 2024 with the first round of the regular season and ends in April 2025.

Audentes/Tallinn University are the defending champions.

TSA/CITYTEED Tallinn won their first title after beating Audentes/Tallinn University in the final.

== Format ==
Each team played each other twice, with the top six reaching the play offs. The team who finished in seventh place would play Audentes Sports Gymnasium, an Estonian team who plays in Latvia. Whoever won the home and away tie will take part in the play offs as the eighth seed. In the play offs, due to their participation in the 2024–25 Women's Baltic Basketball League, TSA/CITYTEED Tallinn automatically made the play offs and were given the number one seed. Every round was held as a best of three series.

== Regular season ==
Pos	Team	Pld	W	L	PF	PA	PD	Pts	Qualification
1	Audentes/Tallinn University	14	14	0	1250	671	+579	28	Play Offs
2	Luunja	14	10	4	971	678	+293	24	Play Offs
3	University of Tartu	14	9	5	839	827	+12	23	Play Offs
4	Rapla KK	14	8	6	917	774	+143	22 (Note: Rapla KK 161–141 Pärnu Sports School)	Play Offs
5	Pärnu Sports School	14	8	6	951	914	+37	22	Play Offs
6	Keila Coolbet	14	5	9	801	744	+57	19	Play Offs
7	TalTech Basketball	14	2	12	593	953	−360	16	Play In
8	Keila Basketball School	14	0	14	534	1295	−761	14	

Source: Naiste Korvpalli Meistriliiga
Rules for classification: 1) Points; 2) Points difference; 3) Points scored.

== Play offs ==
=== Play in ===
Play in
TalTech Basketball	43
Audentes Sports Gymnasium	60

=== Main bracket ===
Quarterfinals
1	TSA/CITYTEED Tallinn	101	93	194
8	Audentes Sports Gymnasium	31	31	62
4	University of Tartu	46	50	96
5	Rapla KK	81	89	190
2	Audentes/Tallinn University	78	85	163
7	Keila Coolbet	50	61	111
3	Luunja	92	88	190
6	Pärnu Sports School	48	42	90

Semifinals
1	TSA/CITYTEED Tallinn	83	74
5	Rapla KK	46	36
2	Audentes/Tallinn University	75	81	156
3	Luunja	53	61	114

Final
1	TSA/CITYTEED Tallinn	76	75	151
2	Audentes/Tallinn University	53	60	113
Third place
3	Luunja	77	63	140
5	Rapla KK	64	59	123

Champions of Estonia

TSA/CITYTEED Tallinn
First title
