= 2024–25 Nationale 1 Dames =

Women's basketball league in Luxembourg

Nationale 1 Dames
- Season: 2024–25
- Dates: Regular season: 21 September 2024 – 22 March 2025; Play Offs and Relegation Group: 28 March – 23 April 2025
- Teams: 8

Regular season
- Season MVP: (United States) Alexus Johnson
- Relegated: Gréngewald Hueschtert

Finals
- Champions: Gréngewald Hueschtert (4th title)
- Runners-up: Sparta Bertrange
- Finals MVP: (United States) Alexus Johnson

Statistical leaders
Points	(United States) Alexus Johnson	26.9
Rebounds	(United States) Alexus Johnson	17.9
Assists	(United States) Alexus Johnson	6.5
Steals	(United States) Alexus Johnson	3.5
Blocks	(United States) Alexus Johnson	1.2

The 2024–25 Nationale 1 Dames is the 65th season of the top division women's basketball league in Luxembourg since its establishment in 1946. It starts in September 2024 with the first round of the regular season and ends in April 2025.

Gréngewald Hueschtert are the defending champions.

Gréngewald Hueschtert won their fourth title after beating Sparta Bertrange in the final.

After the season ended, Gréngewald Hueschtert decided to withdraw from the league in order to rebuild their team.

== Format ==
In the first round, each team plays each other three times. The top four progress to the play offs while the bottom four advance to the relegation group. In the play offs, the semifinals are held as a best of three series while the final is a best of five series. In the relegation group, all previous results are annulled and each team plays each other once. The bottom two teams get relegated.

== Regular season ==
Pos	Team	Pld	W	L	PF	PA	PD	Pts	Qualification
1	Gréngewald Hueschtert (Note: Gréngewald Hueschtert decided to relegate themselves in order to rebuild their team.)	21	21	0	1923	1459	+464	42	Play Offs and Relegation
2	Sparta Bertrange	21	15	6	1655	1426	+229	36	Play Offs
3	AB Contern	21	14	7	1581	1303	+278	35	Play Offs
4	T71 Dudelange	21	13	8	1647	1462	+185	34	Play Offs
5	Amicale Steesel	21	9	12	1603	1694	−91	30	Relegation Group
6	Les Sangliers Wooltz	21	6	15	1384	1691	−307	27	Relegation Group
7	Basket Esch	21	4	17	1405	1758	−353	25	Relegation Group
8	Musel Pikes	21	2	19	1321	1726	−405	23	Relegation Group

Source: Nationale 1 Dames
Rules for classification: 1) Points; 2) Points difference; 3) Points scored.

=== Play offs ===
Semifinals	Final
1	Gréngewald Hueschtert	81	65	71	2
4	T71 Dudelange	63	79	54	1
1	Gréngewald Hueschtert	78	75	71	3
2	Sparta Bertrange	68	67	62	0
2	Sparta Bertrange	66	65	2
3	AB Contern	60	59	0

Champions of Luxembourg

Gréngewald Hueschtert
Fourth title

== Relegation group ==
No one ended up being relegated.

Pos	Team	Pld	W	L	PF	PA	PD	Pts	Qualification
5	Amicale Steesel	3	3	0	266	167	+99	6	
6	Basket Esch	3	2	1	210	225	−15	5	
7	Les Sangliers Wooltz	3	1	2	184	227	−43	4	Reprieved from relegation
8	Musel Pikes	3	0	3	186	227	−41	3	Reprieved from relegation

Source: Nationale 1 Dames
Rules for classification: 1) Points; 2) Points difference; 3) Points scored.
