= 2019–20 Erkekler Basketbol Süper Ligi =

2019–20 Basketbol Süper Ligi
- Season: 2019–20
- Duration: 11 December 2019 – May 2020
- Teams: 5

The 2019–20 Erkekler Basketbol Süper Ligi season, is the premier men's basketball competition in Northern Cyprus.

== Competition format ==
Six teams joined the regular season and competed in a double-legged round-robin tournament. The four best qualified teams of the regular season joined the playoffs.

== Teams ==
Team	District	Venue
Doğu Akdeniz Üniversitesi	İskele	İskele Spor Kompleksi
Girne Amerikan Üniversitesi	Girne	Ertuğrul Apakan Spor Salonu
Koop Spor	Lefkoşa	Atatürk Spor Salonu
Lefke Avrupa Üniversitesi	Lefke	Lefke Avrupa Üniversitesi Dr. Fazıl Küçük Spor Salonu^{2}
Soyer	Lefke	Atatürk Spor Salonu (Note: Soyer is a Lefke-based team playing their home games at Atatürk Spor Salonu, Nicosia.)
Yakın Doğu Üniversitesi	Lefkoşa	NEU RA 25 Spor Salonu

== Regular season ==
=== League table ===
Pos	Team	Pld	W	L	PF	PA	PD	Pts	Qualification
1	Yakın Doğu Üniversitesi	12	11	1	1020	735	+285	23	Qualification to the playoffs
2	Koop Spor	11	10	1	916	767	+149	21	Qualification to the playoffs
3	Girne Amerikan Üniversitesi	11	6	5	781	761	+20	17	Qualification to the playoffs
4	Soyer	11	4	7	696	713	−17	15	Qualification to the playoffs
5	Lefke Avrupa Üniversitesi	12	2	10	811	951	−140	14	
6	Doğu Akdeniz Üniversitesi	11	1	10	529	826	−297	12	

Updated to match(es) played on 10 March 2020. Source:

=== Results ===
Home \ Away	DAU	GAU	KOO	LAU	SOY	YDU	DAU	GAU	KOO	LAU	SOY	YDU
Doğu Akdeniz Üniversitesi	—	41–89	62–93	59–85	39–51	36–105	—					
Girne Amerikan Üniversitesi	74–61	—	29 Jan	72–62	73–66	69–75		—	70–80		75–68	
Koop Spor	81–51	77–70	—	86–62	93–85	81–74	77–29	83–68	—	88–54		55–69
Lefke Avrupa Üniversitesi	72–42	70–95	78–86	—	64–87	71–96				—		35–75
Soyer	60–62	59–65	66–74	70–42	—	51–82	50–32				—	
Yakın Doğu Üniversitesi	66–44	88–50	95–77	84–76	87–51	—		82–54		86–75		—

Updated to match(es) played on 10 March 2020. Source:
Legend: Blue = home team win; Red = away team win.
