= 2018–19 Erkekler Basketbol Süper Ligi =

2018–19 Basketbol Süper Ligi
- Season: 2018–19
- Duration: 10 December 2018 – 24 May 2019
- Teams: 7

Finals
- Champions: Yakın Doğu Üniversitesi
- Runners-up: Lefke Avrupa Üniversitesi

The 2018–19 Erkekler Basketbol Süper Ligi season, was the premier men's basketball competition in Northern Cyprus.

== Competition format ==
Seven teams joined the regular season and competed in a double-legged round-robin tournament. The four best qualified teams of the regular season joined the playoffs.

== Teams ==
| Team | District | Venue |
|---|---|---|
| Doğu Akdeniz Üniversitesi | İskele | İskele Spor Kompleksi |
| Girne Amerikan Üniversitesi | Girne | Ertuğrul Apakan Spor Salonu |
| Koop Spor | Lefkoşa | Atatürk Spor Salonu |
| Lefke Avrupa Üniversitesi | Lefke | Lefke Avrupa Üniversitesi Dr. Fazıl Küçük Spor Salonu^{2} |
| MTV UP Göçmenköy | Lefkoşa | Atatürk Spor Salonu |
| Soyer | Lefke | Atatürk Spor Salonu (Note: Soyer is a Lefke-based team playing their home games at Atatürk Spor Salonu, Nicosia.) |
| Yakın Doğu Üniversitesi | Lefkoşa | NEU RA 25 Spor Salonu |

== Regular season ==
=== League table ===
| Pos | Team | Pld | W | L | PF | PA | PD | Pts | Qualification |
|---|---|---|---|---|---|---|---|---|---|
| 1 | Yakın Doğu Üniversitesi | 12 | 12 | 0 | 988 | 682 | +306 | 24 | Qualification to the playoffs |
| 2 | Koop Spor | 12 | 9 | 3 | 931 | 739 | +192 | 21 | Qualification to the playoffs |
| 3 | Lefke Avrupa Üniversitesi | 12 | 9 | 3 | 914 | 719 | +195 | 21 | Qualification to the playoffs |
| 4 | Girne Amerikan Üniversitesi | 12 | 5 | 7 | 764 | 790 | −26 | 17 | Qualification to the playoffs |
| 5 | MTV UP Göçmenköy | 12 | 3 | 9 | 655 | 857 | −202 | 15 | |
| 6 | Doğu Akdeniz Üniversitesi | 12 | 2 | 10 | 612 | 860 | −248 | 14 | |
| 7 | Soyer | 12 | 2 | 10 | 630 | 847 | −217 | 14 | |

=== Results ===
| Home \ Away | DAU | GAU | KOO | LAU | GOC | SOY | YDU |
|---|---|---|---|---|---|---|---|
| Doğu Akdeniz Üniversitesi | — | 42–70 | 46–90 | 47–83 | 58–61 | 83–67 | 35–66 |
| Girne Amerikan Üniversitesi | 41–53 | — | 73–87 | 74–79 | 76–57 | 75–52 | 68–71 |
| Koop Spor | 77–32 | 91–62 | — | 98–74 | 82–61 | 62–33 | 67–83 |
| Lefke Avrupa Üniversitesi | 72–50 | 82–41 | 82–62 | — | 72–34 | 61–53 | 60–84 |
| MTV UP Göçmenköy | 69–58 | 55–62 | 50–73 | 45–79 | — | 68–65 | 48–87 |
| Soyer | 61–51 | 54–77 | 47–66 | 46–89 | 58–56 | — | 40–76 |
| Yakın Doğu Üniversitesi | 103–57 | 67–45 | 96–76 | 85–81 | 87–51 | 83–54 | — |

Legend: Blue = home team win; Red = away team win.

== Playoffs ==
=== Bracket ===
Semifinals were played in a best-of-five games (2-2-1), while the finals, in a best-of-seven one (2-2-1-1-1).

Semifinals
Yakın Doğu Üniversitesi | 3
Girne Amerikan Üniversitesi | 0
Koop Spor | 2
Lefke Avrupa Üniversitesi | 3

Finals
Yakın Doğu Üniversitesi | 4
Lefke Avrupa Üniversitesi | 0

=== Semifinals ===
| Team 1 | Series | Team 2 | Game 1 | Game 2 | Game 3 | Game 4 | Game 5 |
|---|---|---|---|---|---|---|---|
| Yakın Doğu Üniversitesi | 3–0 | Girne Amerikan Üniversitesi | 78–53 | 74–39 | 71–49 | | |
| Koop Spor | 2–3 | Lefke Avrupa Üniversitesi | 72–62 | 109–69 | 53–72 | 62–77 | 70–76 |

=== Finals ===
| Team 1 | Series | Team 2 | Game 1 | Game 2 | Game 3 | Game 4 | Game 5 | Game 6 | Game 7 |
|---|---|---|---|---|---|---|---|---|---|
| Yakın Doğu Üniversitesi | 4–0 | Lefke Avrupa Üniversitesi | 76–65 | 80–58 | 63–76 | 81–101 | | | |
