= First Women's Basketball League of North Macedonia =

- Current season, competition or edition: 2024–25 First Women's Basketball League of North Macedonia
- Sport: Basketball
- Founded: 1992
- First season: 1992-93
- No. of teams: 7
- Country: North Macedonia
- Continent: Europe
- Most recent champion: WBC Basket Kam (4th title)
- Level on pyramid: 1
- Domestic cup: Macedonian Women's Basketball Cup

The First Women's Basketball League of North Macedonia is the highest women's professional club basketball competition in North Macedonia.

== Current season teams (2013–2014) ==
Team	City	Venue (Capacity)
Badel 1862	Skopje	.
Klubski	Delčevo	.
Krosig	Skopje	Boris Trajkovski Sports Center (8.000)
Pelister	Bitola	Sports Hall Mladost (5.000)
Struga 2009	Struga	Sports Center Jane Sandanski (5.000)
Vajs Profil	Kavadarci	Jasmin Sports Hall (2.500)
WBC Vardar	Skopje	SRC Kale (3.000)

== Champions ==
Season	Winner	Runner-up	Result
1992–93	Student Skopje	.	.
1993–94	.	.	.
1994–95	Student Skopje	.	.
1995–96	.	.	.
1996–97	.	.	.
1997–98	Vigor Skopje	.	.
1998–99	Vigor Skopje	.	.
1999–00	Vigor Skopje	.	.
2000–01	.	.	.
2001–02	.	.	.
2002–03	.	.	.
2003–04	.	.	.
2004–05	.	.	.
2005–06	Kimiko	Vardar	.
2006–07	Vigor Skopje	Biljana	3:1
2007–08	Vigor Skopje	Vardar	2:0
2008–09	Vigor Skopje	Skopje Biljana	.
2009–10	Vardar	Vigor Skopje	.
2010–11	Vigor Skopje	Klubski	3:0
2011–12	Vigor Skopje	Baden	3:0
2012–13	Krosig	Vigor Skopje	3:1
2013–14	Badel 1862	Krosig	3:0
2014–15	Badel 1862	Kožuvčanka	2:0
2015–16	Badel 1862	Klubski Delčevo	2:0
2016–17	Badel 1862	Vardar	3:0
2017–18	Badel 1862	Vardar	3:0
2018–19	Vardar	Badel 1862	3:0
2019–20	Vardar (14-1)	Badel 1862 (14-1)	stopped due COVID-19
2020–21	ŽKK Basket Kam	Badel 1862	3:1
2021–22	WBC Badel 1862	WBC Basket Kam	3:1
2022–23	WBC Basket Kam		
2023–24	WBC Basket Kam		
2024–25	WBC Basket Kam	WBC Kriva Palanka	3:0
