= 2010 ISSA basketball tournament =

High school basketball tournament

The 2010 ISSA basketball tournament was a basketball tournament of the Iloilo Schools Sports Association. Six schools in group A and five schools in group B of the high school division participated. The tournament was hosted by Central Philippine University. Games were held at the De Paul College gym, CPU gym and Iloilo Sports Complex Basketball center. The tournament was held from August 10 through September 14 or 17th, 2010. The champion of group B will go up to group A for the next tournament, while the last place team in group A will be relegated to group B.

== Round robin elimination group A ==
#	Team	GP	W	L
1	Iloilo Central Commercial High School Baby Dragons	5	5	0
2	St.Joseph School Templars	5	4	1
3	Sun Yat Sen Tiongsan	5	3	2
4	University of San Agustin Golden Eaglets	5	2	3
5	Central Philippine University Centralians	5	1	4
6	Colegio de San Jose Josephians	5	0	5

== Round robin elimination group B ==
#	Team	GP	W	L
1	Bethany Life Center Academy Bethans	4	4	0
2	John B. Lacson Foundation Maritime University Dolphins	4	3	1
3	De Paul College Paulinians	4	2	3
4	Holy Rosary Academy Rosarians	4	1	3
5	Iloilo American Memorial School Eagles	4	0	4

== Playoffs ==
Semifinals	Group A	
Game 1		
#1	ICCHS Baby Dragons	W
#4	USA Golden Eagles	L
Game 2		
#2	SJS Templars	L
#3	SYS Tiongsan	W

== Playoffs ==
Semifinals	Group B	
Game 1		
#1	BCLA Bethans	W
#4	HRA Rosarians	L
Game 2		
#2	JBLFMU Dolphins	W
#3	DPC Paulinians	L
