= University Basketball League Australia =

Basketball league in Australia

- Sport: Basketball
- Founded: 2019
- First season: 2021
- CEO: Mark Sinderberry
- No. of teams: 14
- Country: Australia
- Continent: FIBA Oceania (Oceania)
- Sponsor: New Balance
- Website: UniSport.com.au

The University Basketball League Australia (UBL) is a basketball league in Australia run by UniSport. The UBL is the only national university league for any sport in Australia and is the only student-based basketball competition that is supported by Basketball Australia.

Twelve universities from six states participate in the competition in both men's and women's divisions. The league's inaugural season took place in 2021.

== History ==
In September 2018, the National Basketball League (NBL) announced a partnership with UniSport Australia to develop a men's and women's national university league. Twelve months later, UniSport announced that the inaugural University Basketball League season would commence in 2020. The league was endorsed by Basketball Australia. Eight universities were set to compete in the new student-only league, but due to the COVID-19 pandemic, the 2020 season was cancelled.

The UBL launched in 2021 with seven universities and a four-month schedule, but was forced to cancel its finals due to COVID-19 restrictions and lockdowns. The league grew by four universities in 2022, with two more joining in 2023 and one more joining for 2024. Twelve universities participated in 2025.

== Participating universities ==
=== Current ===
As of 2026, the UBL is affiliated with fourteen universities across six states, with all universities having men's and women's teams.

Colours	University	City	State	Joined UBL	Championships
	Adelaide University	Adelaide	South Australia	2022	0
	Curtin University	Perth	Western Australia	2022	0
	Federation University Australia	Ballarat	(Victoria (state)) Victoria	2022	0
	La Trobe University	Melbourne	(Victoria (state)) Victoria	2021	W: 2 (2022, 2023); M: 1 (2024)
	Monash University	Melbourne	(Victoria (state)) Victoria	2026	0
	University of Melbourne	Melbourne	(Victoria (state)) Victoria	2021	W: 1 (2026); M: 2 (2023, 2026)
	University of New South Wales	Sydney	New South Wales	2024	0
	University of Newcastle	Newcastle	New South Wales	2025	0
	University of Sydney	Sydney	New South Wales	2021	W: 1 (2024); M: 1 (2022)
	University of Tasmania	Hobart/Launceston	Tasmania	2023	W: 1 (2025); M: 1 (2025)
	University of Technology Sydney	Sydney	New South Wales	2021	0
	University of the Sunshine Coast	Sunshine Coast	Queensland	2021	0
	University of Western Australia	Perth	Western Australia	2021	0
	Victoria University	Melbourne	(Victoria (state)) Victoria	2021	0

=== Former ===
Colours	University	City	State	Years participating UBL	Championships
	Australian Catholic University	Melbourne	(Victoria (state)) Victoria	2023–2024	0
	RMIT University	Melbourne	(Victoria (state)) Victoria	2022–2024	0

== Sponsorship ==
=== Naming rights ===
- 2024 to present: New Balance
