= Erkekler Basketbol Süper Ligi =

Men's basketball league in Northern Cyprus

- Current season, competition or edition: 2019–20 Erkekler Basketbol Süper Ligi
- Sport: Basketball
- Founded: 1981
- No. of teams: 6
- Country: Northern Cyprus
- Most recent champion: Yakın Doğu Üniversitesi (7th title)
- Broadcaster: BRT
- Sponsor: Kıbrıs Vakıflar Bankası
- Level on pyramid: 1st
- Domestic cup: Federasyon Kupası
- Website: Büyük Erkekler Ligi

The Erkekler Basketbol Süper Ligi (English: Men's Basketball League) and known as the Kıbrıs Vakıflar Bankası Basketbol Süper Ligi due to sponsorship reasons is the top men's professional basketball league in Northern Cyprus. Erkekler Basketbol Süper Ligi was founded in 1981. It is run by the Turkish Cypriot Basketball Federation.

== Current teams ==
| Team | District | Venue |
|---|---|---|
| Doğu Akdeniz Üniversitesi | İskele | İskele Spor Kompleksi |
| Girne Amerikan Üniversitesi | Girne | Ertuğrul Apakan Spor Salonu |
| Koop Spor | Lefkoşa | Atatürk Spor Salonu |
| Lefke Avrupa Üniversitesi | Lefke | Lefke Avrupa Üniversitesi Dr. Fazıl Küçük Spor Salonu^{2} |
| Soyer | Lefke | Atatürk Spor Salonu (Note: Soyer is a Lefke-based team playing their home games at Atatürk Spor Salonu, Nicosia.) |
| Yakın Doğu Üniversitesi | Lefkoşa | NEU RA 25 Spor Salonu |

== Recent champions ==
- 2006–07 – Koop Spor
- 2007–08 – Gönyeli
- 2008–09 – Gönyeli
- 2009–10 – Gönyeli
- 2010–11 – Gönyeli
- 2011–12 – Yenicami
- 2012–13 – Koop Spor
- 2013–14 – Yakın Doğu Üniversitesi
- 2014–15 – Mapfree
- 2015–16 – Koop Spor
- 2016–17 – Yakın Doğu Üniversitesi
- 2017–18 – Yakın Doğu Üniversitesi
- 2018–19 – Yakın Doğu Üniversitesi
