= Women's Korvpalli Meistriliiga =

Estonian top-division basketball league

- Current season, competition or edition: 2024–25 Women's Korvpalli Meistriliiga
- Sport: Basketball
- Founded: 1991
- First season: 1991–92
- No. of teams: 13
- Country: Estonia
- Continent: FIBA Europe (Europe)
- Level on pyramid: 1

The Women's Korvpalli Meistriliiga (Estonian: Naiste Korvpalli Meistriliiga) is the top-division Estonian women's basketball league.

Four to six teams normally take part. The first tournament was held in 1991, won by Maynor Meelis from Tallinn. Teams from Tallinn University account for ten of the championship titles. Since the 2012/13 season the top five clubs have been Ekleks (Tallinn), Tallinna Ülikooli (Tallinn), Audentes SG/Noortekoondis (Tallinn), Tartu Ülikooli (Tartu) and AmEst (Rapla). Latvian league teams also compete, including Lat-Est TBR.

In the 2024/25 season, 10 teams will play in the league.

- Audentes/Tallinn University
- Audentes Sports Gymnasium
- Keila Basket
- Keila Basketball School
- Luunja Women's Basketball Team
- Pärnu Sports School
- Rapla Basketball School
- TalTech BS
- University of Tartu
- TSA/City Roads
