= Nationale 1 Dames =

Premier women's basketball league in Luxembourg

Total League
- Current season, competition or edition: 2024–25 Nationale 1 Dames
- Sport: Basketball
- No. of teams: 10
- Country: Luxembourg
- Continent: Europe
- Most recent champion: Amicale (6th title)
- Most titles: Black Star Mersch (8 titles)
- Sponsor: Total S.A.
- Level on pyramid: 1
- Relegation to: N2 Dames
- Website: flbb.lu/totalleague

Nationale 1 Dames, officially named the Total League - Dames for sponsorship reasons, is the highest women's basketball league in Luxembourg. The league's governing body is Fédération Luxembourgeoise de Basketball (FLBB). Prior to the 2012–13 season, the league was known as the Diekirch League.

The current champions are Amicale who beat Musel Pikes in the 2017 finals.

== Current clubs ==
The league currently consists of 10 teams.

- Amicale
- AB Contern
- Musel-Pikes
- T71 Dudelange
- Etzella
- Grengewald
- Résidence
- Basket Esch
- Sparta
- Telstar

== Title holders ==
- 1946–47 Red Boys Differdange
- 1947–48 BBC Bettembourg
- 1948–49 Progrès Niedercorn
- 1949–50 BBC Bettembourg
- 1950–51 Melusina Steinsel
- 1965–66 Racing Luxembourg
- 1966–67 Racing Luxembourg
- 1967–68 Racing Luxembourg
- 1968–69 Racing Luxembourg
- 1969–70 Amicale
- 1970–71 Black Star Mersch
- 1971–72 Black Star Mersch
- 1972–73 Black Star Mersch
- 1973–74 Amicale
- 1974–75 Amicale
- 1975–76 Black Star Mersch
- 1976–77 Spora Luxembourg
- 1977–78 Spora Luxembourg
- 1978–79 Black Star Mersch
- 1979–80 Spora Luxembourg
- 1980–81 Les Espérants Wasserbillig
- 1981–82 Black Star Mersch
- 1982–83 Black Star Mersch
- 1983–84 Sporting Luxembourg
- 1984–85 Black Star Mersch
- 1985–86 Sporting Luxembourg
- 1986–87 Sporting Luxembourg
- 1987–88 Sporting Luxembourg
- 1988–89 Résidence
- 1989–90 Sparta Bertrange
- 1990–91 Etzella
- 1991–92 Etzella
- 1992–93 Résidence
- 1993–94 Etzella
- 1994–95 Etzella
- 1995–96 Etzella
- 1996–97 Etzella
- 1997–98 Résidence
- 1998–99 Résidence
- 1999–00 Etzella
- 2000–01 Résidence
- 2001–02 Mess
- 2002–03 T71 Dudelange
- 2003–04 Contern
- 2004–05 Musel Pikes
- 2005–06 Basket Esch
- 2006–07 Basket Esch
- 2007–08 Basket Esch
- 2008–09 T71 Dudelange
- 2009–10 Musel Pikes
- 2010–11 Musel Pikes
- 2011–12 Basket Esch
- 2012–13 Musel Pikes
- 2013–14 Musel Pikes
- 2014–15 Amicale
- 2015–16 Amicale
- 2016–17 Amicale
