= United Collegiate Championship League =

- Current season, competition or edition: Season 20
- Founded: 2007
- Country: Philippines

The United Collegiate Championship League (UCCL) is a collegiate sporting league exclusive for colleges and universities based in the Calabarzon region comprising Cavite, Laguna, Batangas, Rizal (although, no schools were represented) and Quezon. The UCCL established in 2007 as the North Batangas Open League. Among the sports who are included in the league are basketball, volleyball, beach volleyball, football, and chess.

== Notable Schools ==
- San Pablo Colleges Ravens - San Pablo, Laguna
- Naga College Foundation Tigers - Naga City, Camarines Sur
- Manuel S. Enverga University Foundation Wildcats - Lucena, Quezon
- First Asia Institute of Technology and Humanities Bravehearts - Tanauan, Batangas
- San Pedro College of Business Administration Tigers - San Pedro, Laguna
- College of Sciences, Technology and Communications Stallions - Sariaya, Quezon
- Lyceum of the Philippines University - Laguna Pirates
- Emilio Aguinaldo College - Cavite Vanguards
- De La Salle Lipa Green Stallions
- University of Perpetual Help System Laguna Saints
- Mapua Malayan Colleges Wizards - Laguna
- Batangas State University Red Spartans
- Liceo de Los Banos Saints - Laguna
- Talisay Polytechnic Institute Maroons - Talisay, Batangas
- Academia De Mayuga - Laurel, Batangas
- CARD-MRI Development Institute - Bay, Laguna
- Immaculate Conception Academy - Dasmarinas, Cavite
- Guang Ming College Flying Dragons - Tagaytay, Cavite
- University of the Philippines Los Banos
- Padre Garcia Polytechnic College - Padre Garcia, Batangas
- Lyceum de San Pablo - San Pablo, Laguna
- Colegio San Agustin - Binan, Laguna
- St. Dominic Savio College - Ibaan, Batangas
- Calamba Doctors College
- Asian Institute of Maritime Studies
- Colegio de Laurel - Laurel, Batangas
- St. Vincent College of Cabuyao
- Cittadini School - San Pedro, Laguna
- Bethel Academy - General Trias, Cavite
- Hermann Harrell Horne School - Bacoor, Cavite
- Talisay Senior High School - Talisay, Batangas

=== NCR Schools ===
- Olivarez College Sea Lions - Paranaque
- De La Salle Zobel
- San Beda College Alabang

=== Former Participating Schools ===
- Philippine College of Criminology Serpent Eagles/Golden Panthers
- Philippine Christian University Dolphins - Dasmarinas, Cavite
- Lyceum of the Philippines University - Batangas Pirates
- Gracel Christian College Foundation, Inc.
- Holy Trinity School - Padre Garcia, Batangas
- Calayan Educational Foundation, Inc. Cougars - Lucena City
- University of Batangas - Batangas City Brahmans
- University of Batangas - Lipa City Brahmans
- St. Jude College Crusaders - Dasmarinas, Cavite
- Colegio ng Lungsod ng Batangas Mustangs
- Westmead International School Warriors - Paranaque
- Emilio Aguinaldo College Generals - Manila
- Philippine National Police Academy Corps Squad
- International Christian Academy Knights - Paranaque
- Queen Anne School Lady Sentries - Santa Rosa, Laguna

== See also ==
- United Central Luzon Athletic Association
- CESAFI
