= Scottish Basketball Championship Women =

National women's basketball league of Scotland

- Sport: Basketball
- No. of teams: 6
- Country: Scotland
- Most recent champion: Edinburgh University
- Website: Official website

The Scottish Basketball Championship Women is the national women's basketball league of Scotland. The league forms the second tier of British women's basketball (inline with the English Basketball League) after the professional setup of the WBBL, where Scotland has one representative, the Caledonia Gladiators. The governing body of basketball in Scotland is basketballscotland.

In 2015, basketballscotland changed the name of the league from Scottish National Basketball League (SNBL) to Scottish Basketball Championship (SBC).

== Teams ==
Listed below are all the teams competing in the 2023-24 Scottish Basketball Championship season.

Club	Location
Boroughmuir Blaze	Edinburgh
City of Edinburgh	Edinburgh
Edinburgh University	Edinburgh
Falkirk Fury	Falkirk
Gladiators	Cumbernauld
St Mirren	Paisley

== Seasons ==
- 2019–20 Scottish Basketball Championship Women season
- 2018–19 Scottish Basketball Championship Women season
- 2017–18 Scottish Basketball Championship Women season
- 2016–17 Scottish Basketball Championship Women season
- 2015–16 Scottish Basketball Championship Women season

== See also ==
- Scottish Basketball Championship Men
