= Iloilo Schools Sports Association =

- Abbreviation: ISSA
- Legal status: Association
- Headquarters: Iloilo City
- Region served: Western Visayas

The Iloilo Schools Sports Association (High School Basketball) is a sports association of Universities and Colleges in Iloilo City, Philippines. In 2007 Season, it has 11 member schools. At the Opening of School Year 2016-2017, the ISSA Board of Trustees approved the inclusion of CenterPhil Montessori, a private school based in Janiuay, Iloilo, as one of its member-schools. CenterPhil is the first school from Iloilo Province that was approved to join ISSA. ISSA is one of the sports associations affiliated with the Iloilo Sports Council and DepEd for Basketball.

== Member schools ==
School (Group A)	Nickname
Hua Siong College of Iloilo	Phoenix
University of Iloilo	Wildcats
Sun Yat Sen High School	Tiongsan
University of San Agustin	Golden Eagles
Central Philippine University	Golden Lions
St. Joseph School	Templars
Western Institute of Technology	Cagers

School (Group B)	Nickname
John B. Lacson Foundation Maritime University	Dolphins
Bethany Christian Life Academy	Bethans
De Paul College	Paulinians
Holy Rosary Academy	Rosarians
Colegio de San Jose	Josephinians
Iloilo American Memorial School	Eagles
CenterPhil Montessori (New Team-2016)	SilverKnights

== Eliminations standing (2007) ==
Standing (Group A)	W	L
ICCHS Baby Dragons	5	0
SYS Tiongsan	4	1
UI Wildcats	3	2
SJS Templars	2	3
USA Golden Eagles	2	3
CPU Golden Lions	1	4

Top 4 Advances to Semis

School (Group B)	W	L
BCLA Bethans	4	1
JBLFMU Dolphins	4	1
CSJ Josephians	3	2
DPC Paulinians	3	2
HRA Rosarians	2	3
IAMS Eagles	0	5

Top 4 Advances to Semis

== 2007 Semifinals round (Knockout) ==
	Group A	
#1	ICCHS baby Dragons	W
#4	SJS Templars	L
-----	-----	-----
#2	SYS Tiongsan	W
#3	UI Wildcats	L

	Group B	
#1	BCLA Bethans	W
#4	DPC Paulinians	L
-----	-----	-----
#2	JBLFMU Dolphins	W
#3	CSJ Josephians	L

Venue: CPU Gymnasium, Jaro Iloilo City

== 2007 Finals Game(Best-of-3) ==
Group A	
ICCHS Baby Dragons	2
SYS Tiongsan	0

Group B	
BCLA Bethans	1
JBLFMU Dolphins	2
