= ACB league (Nicaragua) =

Basketball league in Nicaragua

- Sport: Basketball
- No. of teams: 5
- Country: Nicaragua

The ACB league is one of the top professional basketball leagues in Nicaragua, alongside the Liga Nicaragüense de Baloncesto.

== Current clubs ==
Team	City, Province
Los Trinis	
Sinsa-Tigres	
Tiburones	
Panteras	
Leones de Managua	
