= WBC Vardar =

WBC Vardar
- Leagues: First League
- Founded: 1947
- Arena: SRC Kale
- Capacity: 3,000
- Location: Skopje, Macedonia
- Team colors: Red and Black
- Website: kkvardar.mk
Home	Away

WBC Vardar (Macedonian: КК Вардар)is a women's basketball club based in Skopje, Macedonia. They play in the Macedonian League.

== History ==
WBC Vardar (Macedonian: КК Вардар) is a basketball club based in Skopje. On 20 July 1947, MSD Makedonija and ŽSD Pobeda merged into the newly established Vardar Sports Association, forming a new club named KK Vardar.

== Arena ==
WBC Vardar plays its home matches at SRC Kale, a multi-purpose indoor sports arena in Skopje. Kale means "Fortress Citadel", named after the Skopje Fortress, located right next to the arena. The hall was built in 1970 and its total seating capacity is 2,500.

The hall is mainly used for handball, although it is suitable for events in others sports and music concerts.

== Honours ==
- Champions (27) (North Macedonia)

1948,1949,1950,1951,1952,1953,1954,1955,1956,1957,1958,1959,1960,1965
1966,1967,1968,1969,1970,1971,1972,1973,1974,1975,2010,2019,2020

- Cup (1) (North Macedonia)

2017

== Players ==
Mellisa Rondinelli (Canada) -(age 31) height 184cm
Emilija Lazarova -(age 26) height 164cm
Ivona Pejkovska- ( age 26) Height 175cm
Simona Delovska- (age 29) Height 168cm
Slavica Dimovska-( age 36) height 175cm
Edina Musa- (age 30) height 179cm
Dragana Petkovska-(age 24) height 188cm
Martina Djangarovska-(age 16) height 170cm
Apolonia Thomas (United States) (age 29) height 180cm
Anya Nacevska -(age 15) height 172cm
Emilia Stanoyoska -(age 16) height 168cm
Boyana Nikolik- (age 15) height 165cm
Daria Manevska -(age 16) height 173cm
