= Women's Hong Kong Basketball Association =

- Sport: Basketball
- No. of teams: 7
- Country: Hong Kong
- Continent: FIBA Asia (Asia)
- Level on pyramid: 1

The Women's Hong Kong Basketball Association is the highest women's professional club basketball competition in Hong Kong.
