= Chinese University Basketball Association =

Chinese college basketball competition

Chinese University Basketball Association (CUBA, Chinese: 中国大学生篮球联赛) is a college basketball competition in China. It was founded in 1996 and launched in 1998. This event is held annually and divided into the preliminary stage and the final stage, in which the national championship team is decided through a bracket style elimination event.

Between 2004 and 2015, there was a competing competition known as Chinese University Basketball Super League (CUBS). CUBS allowed professional athletes to participate; restrictions were introduced in 2013. The two competitions merged for the 2015–16 season. As of 2015, CUBA was an amateur-based competition. The competition strived to emulate the NCAA in the United States.

Unlike other Chinese athletic organizations, CUBA is a privately funded organization with no affiliation with the Chinese government. However they do fall under standard FIBA regulations and rules.

== Divisions ==
The league is divided into four divisions, mostly based on the geographical location of the teams. The top two teams in each division qualify for the CUBA Big Eight (quarter-finals).

As of 2015, CUBA's four divisions had a total of 64 men's teams and 46 women's teams.

Division	Team	Division	Team	Division	Team	Division	Team
Southeast Division
Southeast Division	Shanghai	Southwest Division	Hubei	Northwest Division	Shanxi (Taiyuan)	Northeast Division	Beijing
Southeast Division	Jiangsu	Southwest Division	Hunan	Northwest Division	Shaanxi (Xi'an)	Northeast Division	Tianjing
Southeast Division	Zhejiang	Southwest Division	Guangxi	Northwest Division	Gansu	Northeast Division	Liaoning
Southeast Division	Anhui	Southwest Division	Guizhou	Northwest Division	Xinjiang	Northeast Division	Jilin
Southeast Division	Jiangxi	Southwest Division	Yunnan	Northwest Division	Qinghai	Northeast Division	Heilongjiang
Southeast Division	Fujian	Southwest Division	Sichuan	Northwest Division	Ningxia	Northeast Division	Hebei
Southeast Division	Guangdong	Southwest Division	Chongqing	Northwest Division	Inner Mongolia	Northeast Division	Shandong
Southeast Division	Hainan	Southwest Division	Tibet	Northwest Division	Henan	Northeast Division	Hong Kong
Southeast Division		Southwest Division	Macau	Northwest Division		Northeast Division	

== National champions ==
Men's

- 1999 University of Electronic Science and Technology of China
- 2000 Huaqiao University
- 2001 Northeast Normal University
- 2002 Shandong University of Science and Technology
- 2003 Huaqiao University
- 2004 Huazhong University of Science and Technology
- 2005 Huaqiao University
- 2006 Huaqiao University
- 2007 Huaqiao University
- 2008 Huaqiao University
- 2009 China University of Mining and Technology
- 2010 Taiyuan University of Technology
- 2011 Huaqiao University
- 2012 Taiyuan University of Technology
- 2013 Huaqiao University
- 2014 Peking University
- 2015 Huaqiao University
- 2016 Tsinghua University
- 2017 Peking University
- 2018 Peking University
- 2019 Peking University
- 2020 Tsinghua University
- 2021 Tsinghua University
- 2022 Tsinghua University
- 2023 Guangdong University of Technology
- 2024 Tsinghua University
- 2025 Peking University

Women's

- 1999 Tianjin University of Finance and Economics
- 2000 China University of Mining and Technology
- 2001 Tianjin University of Finance and Economics
- 2002 Tianjin University of Finance and Economics
- 2003 Tianjin University of Finance and Economics
- 2004 Tianjin University of Finance and Economics
- 2005 Tianjin University of Finance and Economics
- 2006 Tianjin University of Finance and Economics
- 2007 Tianjin University of Finance and Economics
- 2008 Tianjin University of Finance and Economics
- 2009 Beijing Normal University
- 2010 Beijing Normal University
- 2011 Beijing Normal University
- 2012 Beijing Normal University
- 2013 Beijing Normal University

== See also ==
- Sport in China
- China men's national basketball team
- China women's national basketball team
- Chinese Basketball Association (CBA)
- National Basketball League (China) (NBL)
- Women's Chinese Basketball Association (WCBA)
