= All-American Basketball Alliance (2010) =

Basketball league for white Americans

The All-American Basketball Alliance (AABA) was announced on January 19, 2010 by Don "Moose" Lewis as an all-white basketball league, with players reportedly required to be "natural-born United States citizens", and whose parents must both be "of the Caucasian race". The initial roster of the league was intended to include teams from twelve cities in the southern U.S. Lewis, who was interviewed by Scott Michaux of the Augusta Chronicle, said that one of the objectives of the AABA was restoring "court sanity" to the game of basketball.

== Plans ==
Lewis claimed that local contacts in each of the twelve targeted cities, including Augusta, Georgia; Albany, Georgia; and Chattanooga, Tennessee, would pay $10,000 to become "licensees" of the league.

Lewis also hinted at a possible reality television show, Snow Ball vs. Bro Ball, involving the league.

There is no evidence that Lewis ever followed through on any of these plans.

== Initial reception ==
One of the cities intended to be a part of the AABA was Augusta, Georgia. Augusta's mayor, Deke Copenhaver, stated that he did not support the idea: "As a sports enthusiast, I have always supported bringing more sporting activities to Augusta. However, in this instance I could not support in good conscience bringing in a team that did not fit with the spirit of inclusiveness that I, along with many others, have worked so hard to foster in our city." Clint Bryant, athletic director at Augusta State University, described the idea for the league as "absurd", and noted that it "gives you an idea of the sickness of our society." Dip Metress, head men's basketball director at ASU, also opposed the idea, saying "nobody is going to put money behind this. Basketball is an international game." Chattanooga, Tennessee was another city targeted by Lewis' plan; a spokesman for Chattanooga Mayor Ron Littlefield described Lewis' plan as "absolutely ridiculous", but also added that he was unaware of anything the City could do to actually stop it.

Critics commented on the irony of a whites-only basketball league being announced on Martin Luther King, Jr. Day; former NBA star Charles Barkley called the idea of the AABA "blatantly racist."

Don Lewis, the founder of the AABA and formerly a Georgia-based boxing and wrestling promoter, responded by saying that he did not "hate anyone of color" but that he felt that white people should be given their own league to play "fundamental basketball, which they like" instead of the "street ball" he said is played by nonwhites. He claimed that "white basketball players are essentially 'shut out' of conventional professional basketball due to the proliferation of non-organized play on the court" and cited Gilbert Arenas' suspension for bringing guns into the Washington Wizards' locker room as an example of the way basketball was being run, commenting "That's the culture today, and in a free country we should have the right to move ourselves in a better direction." Lewis claimed to have received threats from people opposed to the AABA's whites-only policy. Besides Augusta, several other cities warned Lewis and the AABA to "stay out of town". Because of the negative attention toward the league, Don Lewis' nephew Ralph said that the physical address of its Atlanta, Georgia office would not be made public.

Reverend R. L. White, president of the Atlanta chapter of the National Association for the Advancement of Colored People (NAACP), described the AABA as "ridiculous" and said "it attempts to set back what we've been trying to do for 100 years." White said he was worried that the all-white basketball league might set off racial tensions, and added, "If we can do anything to stop it, we will."

The Daily Show did a feature on the AABA on March 29, 2010 interviewing Don Lewis, using the show's satirical approach in covering the topic.
