= West Lothian Wolves B.C. =

Basketball club

- League: SBC Division 1
- Established: 2000; 26 years ago
- History: West Lothian Wolves; 2000–present
- Arena: Bathgate Academy (Capacity: 200)
- Location: Bathgate, West Lothian
- Team colours
- Website: Official website

The West Lothian Wolves are a basketball club based in West Lothian, Scotland.

== History ==
The club was formed in 2000, with the formation of an under 14 boys team in order to compete in the BAA Millennium Games. This team would go on to compete in at U14, U16 and U18 regional level. Several of these players now turn out for the Senior Men's team at National League level.

The Wolves' first National League team would be an U16 boys team entering for the 2003-04 season, under the guidance of club founder Alan Hastie.

After a few years of steady growth, the senior team won Division 2 of the Lothian League in 2007 after going unbeaten all season. The team therefore achieved promotion to Division 1.

The team continued to post solid performances in Division 1 of the Lothian League, before claiming the league title in 2014. The year after, the team would enter the first full season of the newly reintroduced National League Division 2, where they have remained since.

== Home Venues ==
The club uses various venues across the West Lothian council area.

Bathgate Academy, Bathgate
Inveralmond Community High School, Livingston
St Margaret's Academy, Livingston
Deans Community High School, Livingston
Whitburn Academy, Whitburn
Linlithgow Academy Sports Hall, Linlithgow
James Young High School, Livingston
West Calder High School, Livingston

== Honours ==
Senior Men
2006/07 Lothian League Div.2 Champions
2013/14 Lothian League Champions

Under 16 Men
2007/08 Lothian League Champions
2015/16 National League Div.2 Champions

Under 18 Women
2014/15 Scottish Cup National Champions
2015/16 National League Playoffs Champions
2015/16 Scottish Cup National Champions

Under 16 Women
2008/09 Lothian League Champions
2013/14 National League Playoffs Champions
2014/15 National League Champions
2014/15 National League Playoffs Champions
2014/15 Scottish Cup National Champions
2015/16 National League Div.2 Champions
2022/23 National League Champions
2022/23 Scottish Cup National Champions

Under 14 Girls
2012/2013 East & Central Regional League Champions
2013/2014 East & Central Regional League Champions
2013/2014 Scottish Cup National Champions

Under 12 Girls
2010/2011 East & Central Regional League Champions
2015/2016 East & Central Regional League Champions

== Men's season-by-season records ==
Season	Division	Tier	League						Playoffs	Scottish Cup
Season	Division	Tier	Finish	Played	Wins	Losses	Points	Win %	Playoffs	Scottish Cup
West Lothian Wolves
2011–12	Lothian Div 1	4	4th	18	10	8	38	0.556		
2012–13	Lothian Div 1	4	4th	20	13	7	46	0.650		
2013–14	Lothian Div 1	4	1st	19	19	0	57	1.000		
2014–15	Lothian Div 1	4	3rd	20	15	5	50	0.750		
2015–16	SBC D2	3	3rd	15	7	8	21	0.467		
2016–17	SBC D2	3	4th	14	7	7	21	0.500	Semi-finals	Round of 16
2017–18	SBC D2	3	3rd	14	9	5	23	0.643	Semi-finals	1st round
2018–19	SBC D2	3	2nd	16	11	5	27	0.688	Semi-finals	Quarter-finals
2019–20	SBC D2	3	3rd	18	13	5	31	0.722		Round of 16
2020-21	SBC D1	2	Season cancelled due to COVID-19 pandemic							
2021–22	SBC D1	2	9th	16	2	14	17	0.125	Did not qualify	2nd round
2022-23	SBC D1	2	10th	20	3	17	26	0.150	Did not qualify	Runners Up
