= List of former British Basketball League teams =

These British Basketball League (BBL) franchises no longer participate in the competition. With the exception of the Scottish team Livingston, all of these teams were based in England.

The years given are for their BBL appearance only, with the earliest start date being 1987, the year of the League's formation. Until 1993, the BBL operated as Carlsberg League Division One, using a promotion-relegation system with National Basketball League.

Many of the teams listed below played in the NBL before joining the BBL, whereas some joined, or rejoined, the NBL/EBL after a stint in Britain's premier basketball league.

- Birmingham Bullets (1987-1988 and 1991-2006)
- Birmingham Knights (2013–14)
- Birmingham Panthers (2007-2008)
- Brighton Bears (1987-2006) earlier Worthing Bears (1987-1999).
- Calderdale Explorers (1987-1988)
- Crystal Palace (1987-1989 and 1996-1998) merged with London Towers in 1998.
- Derby Storm (1987-2002)
- Doncaster Panthers (1993-1996)
- Durham Wildcats (2011-2015)
- Essex Leopards (1994-2003) earlier Leopards (1994-1997) and then Greater London Leopards (1997-2002).
- Essex Pirates (2009-2011)
- Guildford Kings (1987-1994) earlier Kingston Kings (1987-1988) and then Glasgow Rangers (1988-1989) and then Kingston Kings (1989-1992) again.
- Leeds Force (2014-2018)
- Livingston (1987-1989)
- London Capital (2007-2010) demoted to the EBL in 2010.
- London City Royals (2018-2020)
- London Towers (1989-2006)
- London United (2006-2007)
- Manchester Giants (1987-2001) earlier Manchester United (1987-1988) and Manchester Eagles (1988-1989).
- Mersey Tigers (2007-2013) withdrew from the BBL and merged with Liverpool Basketball Club of the EBL.
- Oldham Celtics (1987-1988 and 1992-1994)
- Olympic City Giants (1987-1989) merged with Manchester Eagles in 1989 to become Manchester Giants.
- Plymouth Raiders (2004-2021)
- Portsmouth (1987-1988)
- Solent Stars (1987-1990) demoted to the NBL in 1990.
- Thames Valley Tigers (1987-2005)
- Worthing Thunder (2008-2011) demoted to the NBL in 2011.
- Worcester Wolves (2006-2021)

== Sources ==
- "London United withdraw from BBL". BBC Sport. 2007-09-05. Archived from the original on 2026-09-01.
- Dugdale, Rob (2006-07-30). "Towers owner to suspend franchise for new season". The Guardian. Archived from the original on 2026-02-06.
- Tattum, Colin (2007-03-23). "Basketball team to replace Bullets". Birmingham Mail. Archived from the original on 2012-02-10.
- Tattum, Colin (2012-11-22) [3 June 2008]. "Panthers fold as BBL pull the plug". Birmingham Mail. Archived from the original on 2021-10-26.
- Woods, Mark (2014-06-11). "Birmingham Knights set for BBL exit". MVP Magazine. Archived from the original on 2014-06-13.
