= 1999–2000 Scottish Men's National League season =

1999–00 SNBL season
- League: Scottish Men's National League
- Sport: Basketball
- Number of teams: 10

Regular Season

SMNL seasons
- ← 1998–99 2000–01 →

The 1999–2000 season was the 31st campaign of the Scottish Men's National League, the national basketball league of Scotland. The season featured 10 teams; from the previous season, Aberdeen Buccaneers joined the league and Glasgow Gators did not return. St Mirren won their first league title. There were end of season playoffs for the first time in several seasons, with St Mirren beating City of Edinburgh Kings 2–1 in the final series.

== Teams ==
Location of teams in 1999–00 Scottish Men's National League

The line-up for the 1999–2000 season featured the following teams:

- Aberdeen Buccaneers
- Boroughmuir
- City of Edinburgh Kings
- Clark Erikkson Fury
- Dunfermline Reign
- Glasgow d2
- Midlothian Bulls
- Paisley
- St Mirren McDonalds
- Troon Tornadoes

== League table ==
Pos	Team	Pld	W	L	%	Pts	Qualification
1	St Mirren McDonalds	18	17	1	0.944	35	Qualification to playoffs
2	Glasgow d2	18	15	3	0.833	33	Qualification to playoffs
3	City of Edinburgh Kings	18	13	5	0.722	31	Qualification to playoffs
4	Clark Erikkson Fury	18	12	6	0.667	30	Qualification to playoffs
5	Midlothian Bulls	18	11	7	0.611	29	Qualification to playoffs
6	Troon Tornadoes	18	7	11	0.389	25	Qualification to playoffs
7	Paisley	18	5	13	0.278	23	Qualification to playoffs
8	Aberdeen Buccaneers	18	5	13	0.278	23	
9	Dunfermline Reign	18	4	14	0.222	22	
10	Boroughmuir	18	2	16	0.111	20	

Source: Scottish National League 1999-00 - Britball

== Playoffs ==
Despite finishing second in the league, Glasgow d2 chose not to compete in the playoffs.

=== Quarter-finals ===
Clark Erikkson Fury	74–47	Troon Tornadoes

Midlothian Bulls	75–80	Paisley

=== Semi-finals ===
City of Edinburgh Kings	91–63	Paisley

Paisley	69–92	City of Edinburgh Kings
Edinburgh win 183-132 on agg.

Clark Erikkson Fury	51–70	St Mirren McDonalds

St Mirren McDonalds	74–67	Clark Erikkson Fury
St Mirren win 144-118 on agg.

=== Final ===
St Mirren McDonalds	68–64	City of Edinburgh Kings

City of Edinburgh Kings	79–73	St Mirren McDonalds

St Mirren McDonalds	99–78	City of Edinburgh Kings
St Mirren win series, 2-1.

Source: Scottish Championship Playoffs 1999-00 - Britball

Preceded by 1998–99 season	SNBL seasons 1999–00	Succeeded by 2000–01 season
