= 1997–98 Scottish Men's National League season =

1997–98 SNBL season
- League: Scottish Men's National League
- Sport: Basketball
- Teams: 9

Regular Season

SMNL seasons
- ← 1996–97 1998–99 →

The 1997–98 season was the 29th campaign of the Scottish Men's National League, the national basketball league of Scotland. The season featured 10 teams. Midlothian Bulls won their seventh league title.

== Teams ==
Location of teams in 1997–98 Scottish Men's National League

The line-up for the 1997-98 season featured the following teams:

- Boroughmuir
- Edinburgh Burger Kings
- Clark Erikkson Fury
- Dunfermline Reign
- Glasgow Sports Division
- Glasgow Gators
- Midlothian Bulls
- Paisley
- St Mirren

== League table ==
Pos	Team	Pld	W	L	%	Pts
1	Midlothian Bulls	24	22	2	0.917	68
2	Glasgow Sports Division	24	21	3	0.875	66
3	Edinburgh Burger Kings	24	20	4	0.833	64
4	Paisley	24	12	12	0.500	48
5	St Mirren	24	10	14	0.417	44
6	Clark Erikkson Fury	24	7	17	0.292	38
7	Boroughmuir	24	6	18	0.250	36
8	Dunfermline Reign	24	6	18	0.250	36
9	Glasgow Gators	24	4	20	0.167	32

Source: Scottish National League 1997-98 - Britball

Preceded by 1996–97 season	SNBL seasons 1997–98	Succeeded by 1998–99 season
