= Scottish Cup (basketball) =

Basketball tournament in Scotland

- Sport: Basketball
- Founded: 1947; 79 years ago
- Country: Scotland
- Most recent champions: Falkirk Fury (8th title)
- Most titles: Boroughmuir Blaze (12 titles)

The Scottish Cup is an annual knockout competition for Scottish men's basketball clubs. The inaugural competition was held in 1947.

== History ==
The first Scottish Cup was held in 1947, the same season that leagues in both the east and west of Scotland began to form. The inaugural winners were Pleasance, who beat Aberdeen University.

== List of Scottish Cup finals ==
Season	Champions	Score	Runners-Up	Venue	Notes
1947	Pleasance (1)	34 - 15	Aberdeen University	Princes Street Gardens, Edinburgh	
1947-48	Pleasance (2)	vs.	Jordanhill College	Princes Street Gardens, Edinburgh	
1948-49	Edinburgh University (1)	37 - 26	Maryhill Boys Club	Kelvin Hall, Glasgow	
1949-50	Edinburgh University (2)	vs.	Maryhill Boys Club	Dalmeny Street, Edinburgh	
1950-51	Maryhill Boys Club (1)	31 - 22	Pleasance	West Princes Street Drill Hall, Glasgow	
1951-52	Maryhill Boys Club (2)	40 - 24	Pleasance	Ayr Ice Rink, Ayr	
1952-53	USN Kirknewton Comets (1)	55 - 30	Glasgow Outram Press	Fruitmarket, Edinburgh	
1953-54	USN Kirknewton Comets (2)	58 - 57	Glasgow Outram Press	West Princes Street Drill Hall, Glasgow	
1954-55	Kings Park (1)	vs.	Heriot's FP	West Princes Street Drill Hall, Glasgow	
1955-56	Glasgow Elite (1)	ret.	Edinburgh Hornets	RAF Kirknewton, Edinburgh	
1956-57	Glasgow Elite (2)	37 - 32	Edinburgh Hornets	Kelvin Hall, Glasgow	
1957-58	Edinburgh Hornets (1)	76 - 31	Phoenix Glasgow	Pleasance Sports Centre, Edinburgh	
1958-59	Glasgow Elite (3)	58 - 55	Edinburgh University	National Sports Centre, Largs	
1959-60	Edinburgh University (3)	92 - 42	Glasgow Elite	RAF Kirknewton, Edinburgh	
1960-61	Glasgow Elite (4)	62 - 45	Edinburgh Hornets		
1961-62	USN Kirknewton Comets (3)	69 - 46	Edinburgh Hornets	Pleasance Sports Centre, Edinburgh	
1962-63	USN Kirknewton Comets (4)	92 - 42	Jordanhill College	Pleasance Sports Centre, Edinburgh	
1963-64	Pearce Institute (1)	60 - 43	Heriot's FP	Pleasance Sports Centre, Edinburgh	
1964-65	Edinburgh University (4)	68 - 66	Pearce Institute	Portobello High School, Edinburgh	
1965-66	Boroughmuir (1)	51 - 42	Edinburgh University	Portobello High School, Edinburgh	
1966-67	USN Edzell Enforcers (1)	104 - 85	Edinburgh University	Scottish Police College, Tulliallan	
1967-68	Boroughmuir (2)	90 - 87	USN Lakers	The Hub CEC, Clydebank	
1968-69	Boroughmuir (3)	86 - 61	Heriot's FP	Telford College, Edinburgh	
1969-70	Boroughmuir (4)	78 - 74	Edinburgh Hornets	Telford College, Edinburgh	
1970-71	Boroughmuir (5)	78 - 73	Edinburgh Hornets	Meadowbank Arena, Edinburgh	
1971-72	Boroughmuir (6)	85 - 84	USN Edzell Enforcers	Meadowbank Arena, Edinburgh	
1972-73	Boroughmuir (7)	82 - 78	Paisley	Meadowbank Arena, Edinburgh	
1973-74	Boroughmuir (8)	88 - 50	Pentland Redford	Meadowbank Arena, Edinburgh	
1974-75	Boroughmuir (9)	98 - 88	Dalkeith Saints	Meadowbank Arena, Edinburgh	
1975-76	Boroughmuir (10)	66 - 63	Cavalry Park	Meadowbank Arena, Edinburgh	
1976-77	Paisley (1)	82 - 80	Boroughmuir	Meadowbank Arena, Edinburgh	
1977-78	Paisley (2)	74 - 70	Boroughmuir	Meadowbank Arena, Edinburgh	
1978-79	MIM Edinburgh (1)	96 - 95	Dalkeith Saints	Meadowbank Arena, Edinburgh	
1979-80	MIM Edinburgh (2)	96 - 95	Dalkeith Saints	Meadowbank Arena, Edinburgh	
1980-81	MIM Edinburgh (3)	98 - 78	Boroughmuir	Meadowbank Arena, Edinburgh	
1981-82	MIM Edinburgh (4)	69 - 48	Boroughmuir	Meadowbank Arena, Edinburgh	
1982-83	MIM Edinburgh (5)	83 - 63	Falkirk Team Solripe	Coasters Arena, Falkirk	
1983-84	Falkirk Team Solripe (1)	86 - 71	MIM Edinburgh	Coasters Arena, Falkirk	
1984-85	Falkirk Team Solripe (2)	77 - 70	MIM Edinburgh	Coasters Arena, Falkirk	
1985-86	MIM Edinburgh (6)	133 - 80	Falkirk Team Solripe	Coasters Arena, Falkirk	
1986-87	MIM Livingston (7)	106 - 83	Paisley	Coasters Arena, Falkirk	
1987-88	Cumnock Curries (1)	63 - 56	Paisley	Kelvin Hall, Glasgow	
1988-89	MIM Livingston (8)	75 - 73	Cumnock Curries	Meadowbank Arena, Edinburgh	
1989-90	MIM Livingston (9)	85 - 56	Cumnock Curries	Kelvin Hall, Glasgow	
1990-91	MIM Livingston (10)	86 - 61	City of Edinburgh Kings	Meadowbank Arena, Edinburgh	
1991-92	Livingston Bulls (1)	93 - 65	City of Edinburgh Kings	Meadowbank Arena, Edinburgh	
1992-93	Livingston Bulls (2)	89 - 61	City of Edinburgh Kings	Meadowbank Arena, Edinburgh	
1993-94	Livingston Bulls (3)	76 - 62	Glasgow Brightsiders	Meadowbank Arena, Edinburgh	
1994-95	Livingston Bulls (4)	74 - 61	Glasgow Brightsiders	Meadowbank Arena, Edinburgh	
1995-96	Livingston Bulls (5)	73 - 59	Glasgow Brightsiders	Meadowbank Arena, Edinburgh	
1996-97	Glasgow City S.D. (1)	77 - 60	City of Edinburgh Kings	Meadowbank Arena, Edinburgh	
1997-98	Midlothian Bulls (6)	76 - 71	Glasgow City S.D.	Meadowbank Arena, Edinburgh	
1998-99	St Mirren (1)	70 - 62	City of Edinburgh Kings	Kelvin Hall, Glasgow	
1999-00	Glasgow City S.D. (2)	74 - 70	City of Edinburgh Kings	Kelvin Hall, Glasgow	
2000-01	City of Edinburgh Kings (1)	64 - 63	Troon Tornadoes	Kelvin Hall, Glasgow	
2001-02	St Mirren (2)	85 - 77	City of Edinburgh Kings	Meadowbank Arena, Edinburgh	
2002-03	Troon Tornadoes (1)	73 - 69	City of Edinburgh Kings	Kelvin Hall, Glasgow	
2003-04	City of Edinburgh Kings (2)	82 - 73	Falkirk Fury	Meadowbank Arena, Edinburgh	
2004-05	Troon Tornadoes (2)	80 - 63	City of Edinburgh Kings	Meadowbank Arena, Edinburgh	
2005-06	Troon Tornadoes (3)	79 - 65	City of Edinburgh Kings	Meadowbank Arena, Edinburgh	
2006-07	City of Edinburgh Kings (3)	74 - 70	Falkirk Fury	Kelvin Hall, Glasgow	
2007-08	City of Edinburgh Kings (4)	79 - 60	Troon Tornadoes	Pleasance Sports Centre, Edinburgh	
2008-09	City of Edinburgh Kings (5)	82 - 57	St Mirren	Pleasance Sports Centre, Edinburgh	
2009-10	Falkirk Fury (1)	82 - 66	City of Edinburgh Kings	Pleasance Sports Centre, Edinburgh	
2010-11	City of Edinburgh Kings (6)	76 - 49	St Mirren	Pleasance Sports Centre, Edinburgh	
2011-12	St Mirren (3)	88 - 68	Falkirk Fury	Pleasance Sports Centre, Edinburgh	
2012-13	City of Edinburgh Kings (7)	81 - 62	Glasgow University	Lagoon Leisure Centre, Paisley	
2013-14	Falkirk Fury (2)	70 - 59	St Mirren	Lagoon Leisure Centre, Paisley	
2014-15	Falkirk Fury (3)	99 - 96	St Mirren	Lagoon Leisure Centre, Paisley	
2015-16	St Mirren (4)	90 - 75	Edinburgh University	Lagoon Leisure Centre, Paisley	
2016-17	Falkirk Fury (4)	59 - 54	Boroughmuir Blaze	Oriam, Edinburgh	
2017-18	City of Edinburgh Kings (8)	67 - 54	Boroughmuir Blaze	Oriam, Edinburgh	
2018-19	Falkirk Fury (5)	100 - 78	St Mirren	Oriam, Edinburgh	
2019-20	Boroughmuir Blaze (11)	78 - 72	St Mirren	Lagoon Leisure Centre, Paisley	
2020-21	No competition				
2021-22	Falkirk Fury (6)	68 - 63	Dunfermline Reign	Regional Performance Centre, Dundee	
2022-23	Boroughmuir Blaze (12)	111 - 61	West Lothian Wolves	Regional Performance Centre, Dundee	
2023-24	Falkirk Fury (7)	79 - 67	Dunfermline Reign	Regional Performance Centre, Dundee	
2024-25	Dunfermline Reign (1)	67 - 54	Boroughmuir Blaze	Regional Performance Centre, Dundee	
2025-26	Falkirk Fury (8)	71 - 68	Renfrew Rocks	Playsport Arena, East Kilbride	

== See also ==
- Scottish Basketball Championship
