= 1998–99 Scottish Men's National League season =

1998–99 SNBL season
- League: Scottish Men's National League
- Sport: Basketball
- Number of teams: 10

Regular Season

SMNL seasons
- ← 1997–98 1999–00 →

The 1998–99 season was the 30th campaign of the Scottish Men's National League, the national basketball league of Scotland. The season featured 10 teams; from the previous season Troon joined the league. Glasgow Sports Division won their first league title, ending the 10 year dominance of the Livingston MIM and Bulls teams.

== Teams ==
Location of teams in 1998–99 Scottish Men's National League

The line-up for the 1998–99 season featured the following teams:

- Boroughmuir
- City of Edinburgh Kings
- Clark Erikkson Fury
- Dunfermline Reign
- Glasgow Sports Division
- Glasgow Gators
- Midlothian Bulls
- Paisley
- St Mirren McDonalds
- Troon

== League table ==
Pos	Team	Pld	W	L	%	Pts
1	Glasgow Sports Division	27	26	1	0.963	79
2	St Mirren McDonalds	27	23	4	0.852	73
3	Midlothian Bulls	27	19	8	0.704	65
4	Clark Erikkson Fury	27	18	9	0.667	63
5	City of Edinburgh Kings	27	14	13	0.519	55
6	Paisley	27	13	14	0.481	53
7	Troon	27	10	17	0.370	47
8	Boroughmuir	27	7	20	0.259	41
9	Dunfermline Reign	27	4	23	0.148	35
10	Glasgow Gators	27	0	27	0.000	27

Source: Scottish National League 1998-99 - Britball

Preceded by 1997–98 season	SNBL seasons 1998–99	Succeeded by 1999–00 season
