= 1987–88 British Basketball League season =

1987–88 BBL season
- League: British Basketball League
- Sport: Basketball
- Number of teams: 15

Roll of Honour
- BBL champions: Portsmouth
- Play-off's champions: Livingston
- National Cup champions: Kingston
- BBL Trophy champions: Livingston

British Basketball League seasons
- ← 1986–87 1988–89 →

The 1987–88 BBL season was the first season of the British Basketball League (known as the Carlsberg League for sponsorship reasons), a breakaway competition formed by teams from the English National League and the Scottish National League. The season featured a total of 15 teams, playing 28 games each.

Portsmouth, reigning champions of the English League claimed the regular season title with a dominating campaign led by the likes of Alan Cunningham and Colin Irish. They weren't able to repeat their success in the post-season play-off's as third-seed Livingston, the reigning Scottish champions, caused a huge upset with an 81–72 win over Portsmouth in the final. Kingston won their fourth consecutive National Cup and Livingston claimed the inaugural BBL Trophy.

In the National League (the tier below the Carlsberg League) the Worthing Bears won the league with a 100% (18–0) record and in the play-off semi-final Billy Hungrecker scored a record 73 points in a 119–110 overtime win over Plymouth Raiders, before defeating Brixton TopCats in the final.

== Carlsberg League (Tier 1) ==
=== Final standings ===
Pos	Team	Pld	W	L	%	PF	PA	Pts
1	Portsmouth	28	26	2	0.928	2677	2189	52
2	Kingston	28	24	4	0.857	2931	2475	48
3	Livingston	28	22	6	0.785	2762	2299	44
4	Manchester United	28	21	7	0.750	2718	2345	42
5	Calderdale Explorers	28	20	8	0.714	2694	2256	40
6	Bracknell Tigers	28	17	11	0.607	2623	2435	34
7	Birmingham Bullets	28	14	14	0.500	2638	2757	28
8	Solent Stars	28	14	14	0.500	2638	2757	28
9	Leicester City Riders	28	14	14	0.500	2780	2678	28
10	Bolton & Bury Giants	28	12	16	0.428	2460	2485	24
11	Hemel & Watford Royals	28	9	19	0.321	2647	2893	18
12	Sunderland 76ers	28	8	20	0.285	2588	2905	16
13	Derby Rams	28	4	24	0.142	2062	2640	8
14	Oldham Celtics	28	3	25	0.107	2435	3040	6
15	Crystal Palace	28	2	26	0.071	2281	2981	4

= League winners
= Qualified for the play-offs

== Carlsberg League playoffs ==
=== Playoffs ===
==== Quarter-finals ====
(1) Portsmouth vs. (8) Solent Stars

Portsmouth	115–86	Solent Stars

Solent Stars	103–113	Portsmouth
Portsmouth win series, 2–0

(2) Kingston vs. (7) Birmingham Bullets

Birmingham Bullets	102–117	Kingston

Kingston	114–102	Birmingham Bullets
Kingston win series, 2–0

(3) Livingston vs. (6) Bracknell Tigers

Bracknell Tigers	79–74	Livingston

Livingston	102–85	Bracknell Tigers

Livingston	92–67	Bracknell Tigers
Livingston win series, 2–1

(4) Manchester United vs. (5) Calderdale Explorers

Calderdale Explorers	77–79	Manchester United

Manchester United	83–73	Calderdale Explorers
Manchester win series, 2–0

==== Semi-finals ====
9 April 1988

Portsmouth	98–90	Manchester United

Wembley Arena, London

9 April 1988

Kingston	88–101	Livingston

Wembley Arena, London

==== Final ====
10 April 1988

Murray International Metals Livingston	81–72	Portsmouth
Pts: Graeme Hill (MVP) 23, Rolton Way 23, Tommy Collier 12, Lewis Young 11		Pts: Colin Irish 28, Alan Cunningham 18, Rich Strong 12

Wembley Arena
Attendance: ?
Livingston Coach Jody Gardner
Portsmouth Coach Dan Lloyd

== National League (Tier 2) ==
=== Final standings ===
Pos	Team	Pld	W	L	%	Pts
1	Worthing Bears	18	18	0	1.000	36
2	Brixton Topcats	18	14	4	0.778	28
3	Tower Hamlets	18	12	6	0.667	24
4	Plymouth Raiders	18	12	6	0.667	24
5	Gateshead	18	11	7	0.611	22
6	Aberdare	18	9	9	0.500	18
7	Ellesmere Port Jets	18	7	11	0.389	14
8	Market Harborough	18	3	15	0.167	6
9	Cardiff	18	2	16	0.111	4
10	Stevenage	18	2	16	0.111	4

= League winners

== Prudential National Cup ==
=== Second round ===
Loftys Travel Ellesmere Port	94–99	Sunderland 76ers

Leicester City Riders	105–73	IIIE Gateshead

Sharp Manchester United	114–72	BPCC Derby Rams

Drapers Tools Solent Stars	117–98	Brunel Crystal Palace London

Alphaprint H. Hempstead Watford Royals	106–79	JHB Oil Plymouth

Calderdale Explorers	95–78	Oldham Celtics

North London College	70–137	Polycell Kingston

Portsmouth	85–82	Bracknell Tigers

=== Quarter-finals ===
Polycell Kingston	108–100	Alphaprint H. Hempstead Watford Royals

Sharp Manchester United	83–80	Calderdale Explorers

Leicester City Riders	104–93	Drapers Tools Solent Stars

Portsmouth	98–88	Sunderlands 76ers

=== Semi-finals ===
Polycell Kingston	109–91	Leicester City Riders

Portsmouth	107–90	Sharp Manchester United

=== Final ===
14 December 1987

Kingston	90–84	Portsmouth
Pts: Martin Clark 31, Joel Moore 25, Danny Davis 11, Steve Bontrager 11		Pts: Alan Cunningham 32, Mike Spaid 14, Karl Tatham 11, Rich Strong 10, Marc Glass 10, Colin Irish 2

Royal Albert Hall, London
Attendance: 5,000
Kingston Coach Kevin Cadle
Portsmouth Coach Dan Lloyd

== NatWest Trophy ==
=== Group stage ===
North Group 1

Team	Pts	Pld	W	L	Percent
1. Calderdale Explorers	10	6	5	1	0.833
2. Manchester United	10	6	5	1	0.833
3. Bolton & Bury Giants	4	6	2	4	0.333
4. Oldham Celtics	0	6	0	6	0.000

North Group 2

Team	Pts	Pld	W	L	Percent
1. Livingston	12	6	6	0	1.000
2. Leicester City Riders	6	6	3	3	0.500
3. Sunderland 76ers	6	6	3	3	0.500
4. Derby Rams	0	6	0	6	0.000

South Group 1

Team	Pts	Pld	W	L	Percent
1. Kingston	12	6	6	0	1.000
2. Hemel & Watford Royals	4	6	2	4	0.333
3. Crystal Palace	4	6	2	4	0.333
4. Birmingham Bullets	4	6	2	4	0.333

South Group 2

Team	Pts	Pld	W	L	Percent
1. Portsmouth	8	4	4	0	1.000
2. Bracknell Tigers	4	4	2	2	0.500
3. Solent Stars	0	4	0	4	0.000

=== Semi-finals ===
Calderdale Explorers vs. Livingston

Calderdale Explorers	75–68	Livingston

Livingston	90–67	Calderdale Explorers
Livingston win on aggregate, 158–142

Kingston vs. Portsmouth

Portsmouth	94–87	Kingston

Kingston	80–74	Portsmouth
Portsmouth win on aggregate, 168–167

=== Final ===
30 March 1988
20:00

Livingston	96–91	Portsmouth
Scoring by half: 46–56, 50–35
Pts: Ralton Way 33, Tommy Collier 19, Lewis Young 17		Pts: Alan Cunningham 33, Marc Glass 25, Colin Irish 24

Aston Villa Leisure Centre, Birmingham
Attendance: 2,000
Livingston Coach Jody Gardner
Portsmouth Coach Dan Lloyd

== Seasonal awards ==
- Most Valuable Player: Daryl Thomas (Hemel & Watford Royals)
- Coach of the Year: Gary Johnson (Calderdale Explorers)
- All-Star Team:
  - Steve Bontrager (Kingston)
  - Alan Cunningham (Portsmouth F.C.)
  - Dan Davis (Kingston)
  - Vic Flemming (Livingston)
  - Marcus Gaither (Birmingham Bullets)
  - Colin Irish (Portsmouth F.C.)
  - Gary Johnson (Calderdale Explorers)
  - Phil Smith (Solent Stars)
  - Daryl Thomas (Hemel & Watford Royals)
  - Clyde Vaughan (Leicester City Riders)

Preceded by 1986–1987 season	BBL seasons 1987–88	Succeeded by 1988–89 season
