= Dalkeith Saints B.C. =

- League: Scottish Men's National League
- Established: 1964
- Folded: 1997
- Location: Dalkeith, Edinburgh
- Team colours: Green and White
- Ownership: (Scotland) Alex Jack
Home	Away

Dalkeith Saints Basketball Club was a Scottish basketball club founded in 1964 in Dalkeith, a suburb of Edinburgh.

== History ==
Originally formed in 1923 as Dalkeith St. John's & Kings Park Lads Club and a founding member of the Union of Boys Clubs Midlothian, Dalkeith Saints was renamed by President Alex Jack. After initially being a youth team the Senior team was formed in 1964 and renamed as the Dalkeith Saints and in 1969 he was invited to attend the first Scottish national basketball championship.

The men's team was one of the top Scotland teams between the '70s and early' 80s, reaching three finals of the Scottish Cup in six years and competing in 1979-80 European Korac Cup ( they were defeated by Valladolid in the second qualifying round), while the women's team won the Scottish Cup twice and Scottish league three times.

In 1997, the Saints merged with Livingston Bulls, to form Midlothian Bulls.

Currently there is a women's training, Midlothian Saints, the latest issue of Dalkeith Saints.

== Record in European competition ==
Season	Competition	Round	Opponent	1st Leg	2nd Leg	Aggregate
1979-80	FIBA Korać Cup	Second round	(Spain) Valladolid	86-115	81-118	167-233

== See also ==
- Scottish Men's National League
- Scottish Cup (basketball)
