= Edinburgh University Sports Union =

- Institution: University of Edinburgh
- Location: Edinburgh, Scotland, UK
- Established: 1866
- President: Philine Rouwers (2024/25)
- Affiliations: British Universities and Colleges Sport, Scottish Student Sport
- Website: http://www.eusu.ed.ac.uk/

Edinburgh University Sports Union (EUSU) is the representative body of seventy University of Edinburgh sports clubs.

Edinburgh University sports teams compete in the British Universities and Colleges Sport (BUCS) and Scottish Student Sport leagues. Edinburgh was ranked 3rd in the BUCS rankings in 2017/18, 2016/17, 2015/16, 2014/15, 4th in 2018/19 and 2021/22, 5th in 2013/14 and 2022/23, and 6th in 2012/13 and 2011/12.

EUSU also runs an intramural sports programme. Football (men's and women's), basketball, hockey, netball, rugby, and squash are available, and fixtures are played weekly.

== Structure ==
EUSU is primarily run by an elected Executive Committee composed of 10 students. It is chaired by an elected Sabbatical President. The other members fill the roles of Honorary Treasurer, Vice President Inclusion, Vice President Intramural, Honorary Secretary, Intramural Co-ordinator, Media Officer, Wellbeing Officer, Partnerships and Alumni Officer, and Inclusion Officer. The Executive Committee is supported by the Director of the University's Sport and Exercise, around five permanent members of staff and three advisors.

The Finance Committee is chaired by the Honorary Treasurer. On it sit eight ordinary members, the President, the Partnerships and Alumni Officer, the Honorary Secretary, and the Senior Treasurer. It approves the Sports Union budget and administers all funds (such as Representation, Equipment etc.)

The Blues and Colours Committee is chaired by the President. On it sit three ordinary members, the Honorary Secretary, the Vice President, the Director of Sport & Exercise and three graduate members. It meets to discuss and approve applications for Blues, Half Blues and Colours.

The Intramural Sport Committee is responsible for adequately running the fantastic Intramural Sport Programme.

The Media Team is responsible for all communications and marketing that comes from the Sports Union.

The Inclusion Committee is responsible for promoting inclusivity across all areas of the Sports Union.

The General Committee must be attended by at least one member of every member club; each club and member of the Executive Committee has one vote. The General Committee meets several times a semester to ratify policy and finance decisions and to exchange information between EUSU and the clubs. It can act as a Court of Appeal for those Clubs disputing finance and policy decisions.

The Annual General Meeting must be attended by 2 members of each member club. Any other member who wishes may attend. It is held in the last semester of the university year. Reports from the President, Honorary Treasurer and Vice President are presented, and elections to the Executive Committee are held.

There are also eight Honorary Vice Presidents and an Honorary President.

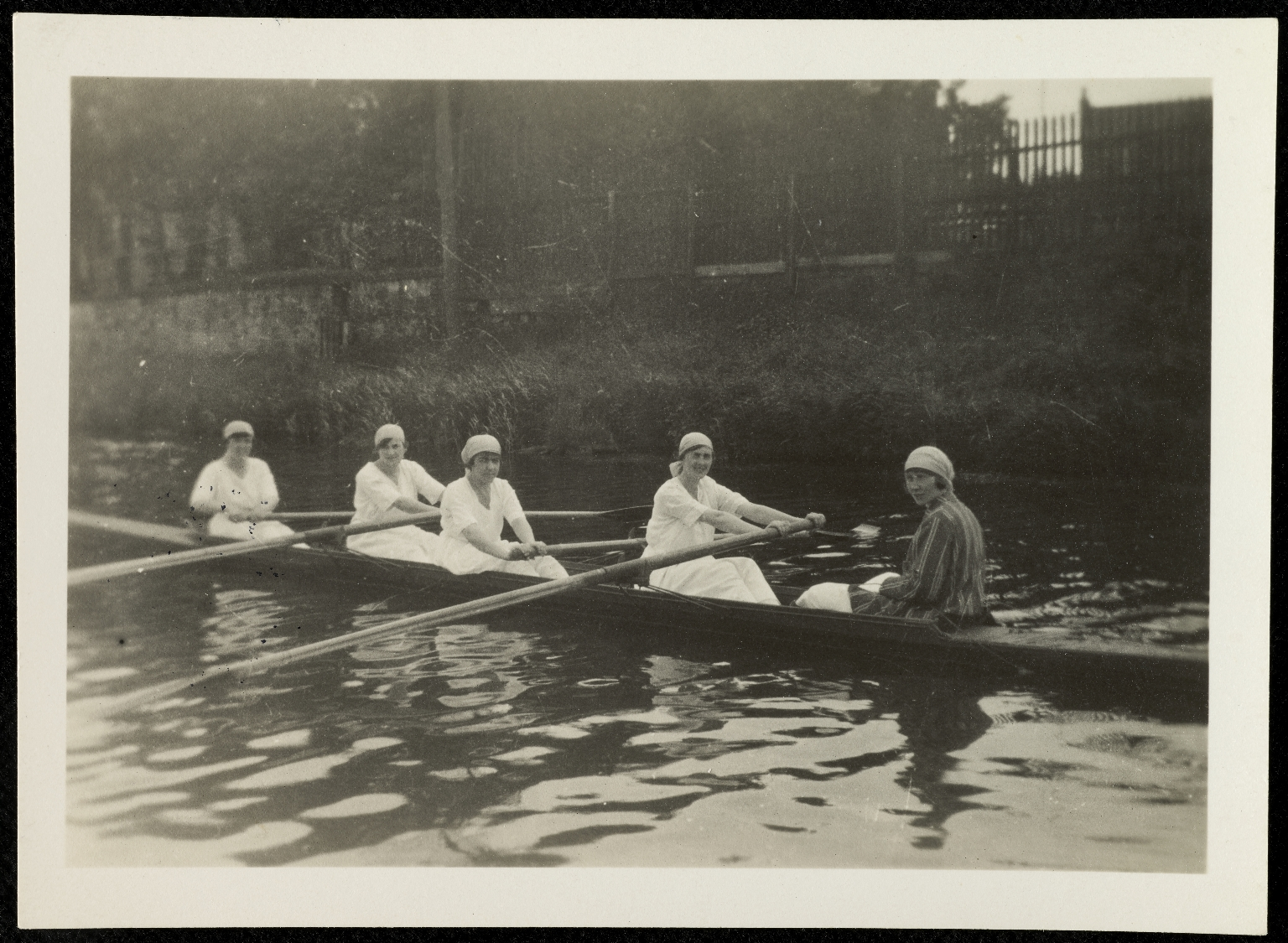
University of Edinburgh Medical Women's 4s in 1922

== Facilities ==
Sporting facilities at the University of Edinburgh are run by Sport & Exercise, not by EUSU, though EUSU clubs are of course their primary users. Other users come from a variety of sectors, including the university community, corporate organisations, schools and local clubs.

The University's main indoor facility is located at Pleasance. It includes a large sports hall, four glass-backed squash courts, two hard-backed squash courts, two weight training gyms, a free weights room, a circuit training gym, a combat salle, a rifle range, an archery range, a boxing gym, three multipurpose rooms, and a fitness assessment and sports injuries clinic (FASIC).

The University's 25-metre swimming pool is located at St Leonard's Land, 250 metres from the Pleasance. The pool is also used for research, lifeguard training and water sports such as water polo, canoeing and triathlon.

The University's outdoor centre is the Firbush Point Centre on Loch Tay in Perthshire. It offers courses throughout the year in sailing, hillwalking and mountaineering, windsurfing, canoeing and first aid.

The University has playing fields at Peffermill, around 4 km from the city centre and covering 27 acres (110,000 m^{2}). Peffermill's facilities include three changing pavilions, two floodlit synthetic pitches as well as grass football, rugby, lacrosse, shinty and cricket pitches. It also hosts the national Hockey Academy after a £3.5m refurbishment. Peffermill has hosted events including a Hockey World Cup tournament, the Millennium Youth Games, the British University Games, the EHF Women's Cup Winners' Cup and the 2010 World Universities' Hockey Championships. The Laurie Liddell Clubhouse has hosted meetings, seminars and courses in medicine, sport and business.

== Clubs ==
EUSU has over 60 student-run clubs including:

- Edinburgh University Men's Hockey Club
- Edinburgh University Mountaineering Club
- Edinburgh University Sub Aqua Club
- Edinburgh University Weightlifting Club
- Edinburgh University Gymnastics Club
- Edinburgh University Karate Club
- Engineering Hockey (Intramural)
- Edinburgh University Badminton Club
- Edinburgh University A.F.C. (men)
- Edinburgh University Hutchison Vale F.C. (women)
- Edinburgh University Boat Club
- Edinburgh Universities Ice Hockey Club
- Edinburgh University RFC
- Edinburgh University Shinty Club
- Edinburgh University Boxing Club
