= Birmingham Knights =

- League: BBL
- Established: 2011
- Folded: 2014
- History: Birmingham Knights; 2013–2014
- Arena: North Solihull Sports Centre
- Capacity: 600
- Location: Birmingham, West Midlands
- Team colours
- Head coach: (England) Paul Douglas
- Ownership: Oaks Consultancy
- Website: BirminghamKnights.co.uk

The Birmingham Knights were a British professional basketball team based in Birmingham, England, and members of the British Basketball League. The team featured in only one campaign – the 2013–14 season - playing games at the North Solihull Sports Centre. In 2014, the club was withdrawn from the League and folded.

== History ==
The club was established in 2011 after a successful bid to join the British Basketball League, marking professional basketball's return to the city of Birmingham since the Birmingham Panthers folded in 2008. The franchise bid was organised by Oaks Consultancy and the team was due to start playing in the 2012–13 season, with initial plans for the team to use the International Futsal Arena as the venue for home games. However, after a "short-term delay" to the venue alternations, the franchise management postponed play until the 2013–14 season.

In February 2013, it was announced that former Birmingham Bullets player and Panthers assistant coach Paul Douglas would coach the new team in their inaugural season in the BBL. It was also revealed that due to ongoing venue issues, the new team would now play its home games at the Doug Ellis Sports Centre, located on the campus of Birmingham City University.

A competition was run via the team's official website where fans were asked to suggest names for the new club, and on 14 May 2013 the winning entry was announced as the Birmingham Knights.

In an addition to the coaching team, former Bullets star Tony Simms was announced as Coach Douglas' assistant in July. Whilst in another setback to the club's ongoing venue troubles, the Knights ownership announced on 25 July that the team would now stage its home games at the North Solihull Sports Centre, in Chelmsley Wood, as it became apparent that the sports hall floor at the Doug Ellis Sports Centre was incapable of carrying the temporary bleacher seating used to house spectators during games.

The Knights drafted in a core of locally-based players to form the initial roster, with the signings of former Leicester Riders player Emile Hopkins, and former England youth international's Ryan Lewis and brothers Martyn and Michael Gayle. The first import player to be added to the roster was Brent Benson, who had previously played in the Euroleague and NBA D-League. A second American signing came soon after with the arrival of Armond Battle from Urbana University (NCAA Division II), though his stay was short lived after tearing his achilles tendon in only his second appearance for the Knights. The team's first competitive game was played away to reigning Champions Leicester at their John Sanford Centre home on 28 September. It was to be a baptism of fire for the rookies, as the home side recorded a 90–59 victory. Despite closing Sheffield Sharks to a tight 95–102 loss on their home debut a couple of weeks later – which saw Brent Benson post a club record 45 points – the Knights suffered several blowouts in their first month, including a 130-70 loss to Newcastle Eagles and a 72–103 defeat to Plymouth Raiders.

The signings of former Savannah State Tigers player Glen Izevbigie and ex-Mersey Tigers star Josh Lockett couldn't change the team's fortunes and by the end of the regular season the Knights failed to record a single win, emulating Mersey Tigers infamous 0–33 finish from the previous year. Having struggled to match any opponent on court and with reported disagreements between the club's management, the franchise was informally put up for sale by its owners, Oaks Consultancy. With no interested buyers, the club was withdrawn from the League in June 2014.

== Home arena ==
North Solihull Sports Centre

North Solihull Sports Centre (2013–2014)

== Season-by-season records ==
| Season | Division | Tier | Regular Season | | | | | | Post-Season | Trophy | Cup | Head coach |
| Season | Division | Tier | Finish | Played | Wins | Losses | Points | Win % | Post-Season | Trophy | Cup | Head coach |
|---|---|---|---|---|---|---|---|---|---|---|---|---|
Birmingham Knights
| 2013–2014 | BBL | 1 | 12th | 33 | 0 | 33 | 0 | 0.000 | Did not qualify | 1st round (BT) | 1st round (BC) | Paul Douglas |

== Players ==
=== Final roster ===
Note: Flags indicate national team, as has been defined under FIBA eligibility rules. Players may hold more than one non-FIBA nationality.

| No. | Pos. | Nat. | Player |
|---|---|---|---|
| 4 | PG | (England) ENG | Michael Gayle |
| 6 | PG | (England) ENG | Kieran Mills |
| 7 | F | (England) ENG | Josh Rolls-Tyson |
| 8 | G | (England) ENG | Martyn Gayle |
| 9 | PG | (England) ENG | Parmjit Dalia |
| 10 | C | (Australia) AUS | James McKeown |
| 11 | G | (England) ENG | Jordan Dawes |
| 12 | SF | (United States) USA | Armond Battle |
| 13 | G | (England) ENG | Aaron Maher |
| 15 | G | (England) ENG | David Malcolm |
| 20 | G | (United States) USA | Brent Benson |
| 22 | SF | (England) ENG | Emile Hopkins |
| 23 | F | (England) ENG | Ryan Lewis |
| 34 | C | (Germany) GER | Joshua Lockett |
| 45 | C | (United Kingdom) GBR | Glen Izevbigie |

== See also ==
- British Basketball League
- Birmingham Bullets
- Birmingham Panthers
