= West Princes Street drill hall =

Former drill hall in Glasgow, Scotland

- Glasgow, Scotland
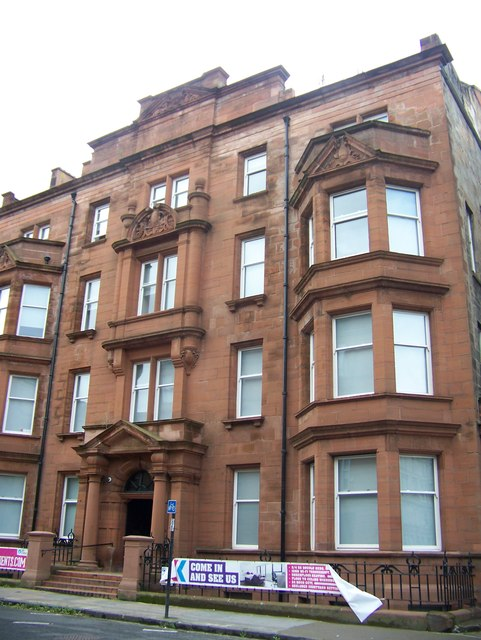
- West Princes Street drill hall

Site information
- Type: Drill hall

Location
- Location within Glasgow
- Coordinates: 55.87165°N 4.27469°W

Site history
- Built: 1895 – 1897
- Built for: War Office
- Architect: George Bell
- In use: 1897 – late 1970s

The West Princes Street drill hall is a former military installation in Glasgow, Scotland.

== History ==
The drill hall was designed by George Bell of Clarke & Bell as the headquarters of the 1st Lanarkshire (Glasgow 1st Western) Volunteer Rifle Corps and was completed between 1895 and 1897. This unit evolved to become the 5th Battalion, The Cameronians (Scottish Rifles) in 1908. The battalion was mobilised at the drill hall in August 1914 before being deployed to Western Front. The battalion amalgamated with the 8th Battalion to form the 5th/8th Battalion, The Cameronians (Scottish Rifles) in 1921 and then converted to a searchlight regiment in 1938 and to a light anti-aircraft regiment in 1942.

After the Second World War the regiment was re-constituted at the West Princes Street drill hall as 591st Light Anti-Aircraft Regiment Royal Artillery and then, in 1955, as the 445th (Cameronians) Light Anti-Aircraft Regiment Royal Artillery. In 1967 the drill hall became the home of 207 (City of Glasgow) Battery Royal Artillery but in the late 1970s the battery moved to the Crow Road drill hall. The building was decommissioned and served as the home of the Scottish Ballet School from 1979 until the school left the building in 2008. It then stood vacant until it was converted into student accommodation in 2012.
