= Glasgow City B.C. =

- League: (M) SBC Division 2
- Established: 1982; 44 years ago
- History: East End Brightsiders (1982–1996); Glasgow Sports Division (1996–1999); Glasgow d2 (1999–2005); Glasgow City (2005–present)
- Location: Glasgow, Scotland
- Team colors: Blue, White
- Championships: 1 Scottish Men's League; 2 Scottish Cup
- Website: Official website

Glasgow City B.C. are a Scottish basketball club, based in the east end of the city of Glasgow, Scotland.

== History ==
The club was founded in 1982, by locals James ‘Mick’ McKechnie and Willie Cameron. Over its history, the club has produced many locally based players who have represented Scotland.

=== Success ===
The club most successful spell was in the late 1990s and early 2000s, when it won the Men's National League title in 1999, the Scottish Men's Cup in 1997 and 2000 and the Women's Cup in 1999. During this time, the club were sponsored by Sir Tom Hunter's Sports Division, and later by his new company d2.

=== Expansion rumours ===
In 1994, the Brightsiders, as they were then known, were considered as a potential expansion team for the top-tier British Basketball League, to be the first Scottish involvement in the league since Livingston and Glasgow Rangers dropped out of the league at the end of the 1988–89 season. The Brightsiders that year also competed in the World Invitation Club Basketball competition in London. In 1999, the team were considered for invitation to the BBL Trophy, after rumours circulated the club were in talks to take over the league franchise of the Worthing Bears.

=== Decline ===
The team's success dried up and following several years of bottom-half finishes, the club eventually withdrew from the National League at the end of the 2006–07 season.

=== Remergence ===
Following over 10 years away from the national league, the senior men's team re-entered National League Division 2 in 2019.

== Teams ==
City will field the following teams for the 2019–20 season:

- Senior Men: National League Division 2
- Senior Women: Strathclyde League
- U18 Men: National League U18 Division 2
- U18 Men II: Strathclyde U18 League
- U18 Women: National League U18 Division 1
- U16 Men: Strathclyde U16 League

== Home Venue ==
- Eastbank Academy, Shettleston
- Bannerman High School, Baillieston
- St Andrew's RC Secondary School, Greenfield
- St Mungo's Academy, Bridgeton

== Men's team ==
=== Honours ===
- Scottish League
  - Winner: 1999
- Scottish Cup
  - Winner: 1997, 2000
  - Runner-up: 1994, 1995, 1996, 1998

=== Season-by-season records ===
Season	Division	Tier	Regular Season						Post-Season	Scottish Cup
Season	Division	Tier	Finish	Played	Wins	Losses	Points	Win %	Post-Season	Scottish Cup
Glasgow City
2019–20	SBC Div 2	3	10th	18	1	17	19	0.056	Did not qualify	Did not compete

== Women's team ==
=== Honours ===
- Scottish Cup
  - Winner: 1999

=== Notable players ===
Criteria

To appear in this section a player must have either:

- Played at least three seasons for the club.
- Set a club record or won an individual award while at the club.
- Played at least one official international match for their national team at any time.
- Played at least one official WNBA match at any time.

- (Australia) Bronwyn Marshall
- (Socialist Federal Republic of Yugoslavia) Slavica Zelenovic
