= Olympic City Giants =

Basketball team in Oldham, England

- League: National Basketball League (1981–1987); British Basketball League (1987–1989)
- Established: 1981
- Folded: 1989, merged with Manchester Eagles to become Manchester Giants
- History: Bolton & Bury Lobos; 1981–1986; Bolton & Bury Hawks; 1986–1987; Bolton & Bury Giants; 1987–1988; Olympic City Giants; 1988–1989
- Location: Oldham, Greater Manchester
- Team colours: Green, White and Gold
- Ownership: Mike Shaft
Home

Olympic City Giants were a professional basketball team based in Oldham, England. Previously based in Bolton and Bury, the team were known as Bolton & Bury Hawks and then Bolton & Bury Giants, the team were founder members of the British Basketball League in 1986.

After an eighth-place finish in the 1987–88 Carlsberg League campaign, Giants qualified for their first and only BBL-era Play-off. They drew top seed Glasgow Rangers, and were soundly beaten in both games of the best-of-three series by the regular season Champions.

In 1989 after encountering several financial difficulties, Olympic City Giants formally merged with Manchester Eagles (formerly Manchester United) to become Manchester Giants, marking a return of the famous name after a three-year absence, following a merger between the original Manchester Giants and Manchester United in 1985.

== Season-by-season records ==
Season	Division	Tier	Regular Season						Post-Season	Trophy	Cup	Head coach
Season	Division	Tier	Finish	Played	Wins	Losses	Points	Win %	Post-Season	Trophy	Cup	Head coach
Bolton & Bury Giants
1987–1988	BBL	I	10th	28	12	16	24	0.428	Did not qualify	Quarter-final	-	-
Olympic City Giants
1988–1989	BBL	I	8th	20	4	16	8	0.200	Lost in Quarter-finals to Glasgow Rangers, 0–2	Quarter-final	-	-

== Notable former players ==
- (United States) Ed Bona
- (United States) Jimmy Brandon
- (United States) Terry Crosby
- (United Kingdom) Steve Nelson
- (United Kingdom) Robbie Peers
- (United States) Kenny Scott
- (United States) Cleveland Woods
- (United Kingdom) Lee Martin

== See also ==
- British Basketball League
