= Calderdale Explorers =

- League: NBL Division 3
- Established: 1982
- History: Halifax Hawks; 1982-1983; Calderdale Explorers; 1983-1992; Calderdale Explorers; 2014–present
- Location: Halifax, Yorkshire
- Team colours: Blue and White
- Team manager: Glenn Hardaker
- Head coach: Eugene Andrew
- Website: calderdaleexplorers.co.uk
Home	Away

The Calderdale Explorers are an English basketball club, based in Halifax, West Yorkshire.

The Explorers compete in English Basketball League Division 3 North. A previous incarnation of the club was a founding member of the British Basketball League, reaching the playoff semi-finals during the league's inaugural season in 1987-1988.

== History ==
The team was established as the Halifax Explorers in 1982, when they entered Division 2 of the National Basketball League. They changed their name to Calderdale after just one year, and in 1986 the club won promotion to Division 1, which was then the top tier of basketball in England.

In 1987, the Explorers joined 14 other teams from the National Basketball League (England) and Scottish National Basketball League to form the new British Basketball League. The Explorers were successful in the new top flight, finishing fifth in league competition and reaching the playoff semi-finals while also reaching the quarter-finals of the National Cup. However, the club were forced to withdraw from the professional league after just one season, as they could not afford the court hire charge of just £14 at their North Bridge Leisure Centre venue. The club returned to competition in NBL Division 2 a year later in 1989, but ongoing financial issues meant the club soon folded in 1992, just a decade since they were founded.

The club was revived in 2014, initially as a junior club competing in local competitions. A senior National League team was added in March 2015, entering the National Development League for their first season before the league was rebranded as Division 4. A steady record for improvement culminated with winning the Division 4 (North) league title at the end of the 2017/2018 season, earning promotion to Division 3. The Explorers were coached in Division 3 by Peter Broderick, who played for the old club in the 1990s.

== Honours ==
NBL Division 4 League Champions

- 2018

== Season-by-season records ==
Season	Division	Tier	Pos.	Played	Won	Lost	Points	Win %	Playoffs	National Cup
Calderdale Explorers
1983-84	NBL D2	2	4th	24	16	8	32	0.667		1st round
1984-85	NBL D2	2	3rd	22	17	5	34	0.773		1st round
1985-86	NBL D2	2	1st	22	18	4	36	0.818		2nd round
1986-87	NBL D1	1	7th	24	10	14	20	0.417	Quarter-finals	Semi-finals
1987-88	BBL	1	5th	28	20	8	40	0.714	Quarter-finals	Quarter-finals
1989-90	NBL D2	3	11th	20	3	17	6	0.150		
1990-91	NBL D2	3	10th	22	7	15	14	0.318		2nd round
1991-92	NBL D2	3	11th	22	5	17	10	0.227		
Calderdale Explorers
2015-16	Dev NW	5	5th	16	8	8	16	0.500	Did not qualify	Did not compete
2016-17	D4 Nor	5	5th	18	11	7	22	0.611	Did not qualify	1st round
2017-18	D4 Nor	5	1st	21	19	2	38	0.905	Quarter-finals	3rd round
2018-19	D3 Nor	4	12th	22	2	20	4	0.091	Did not qualify	Did not compete
2019-20	D3 Nor	4	4th	21	15	6	30	0.714	No playoffs	Did not compete
