= Midlothian Bulls =

- League: Scottish National League
- Established: 1989 as MIM Livingston
- Folded: 2001
- History: MIM Livingston; 1989–1991; Livingston Bulls; 1991–1997; Midlothian Bulls; 1997-2001
- Location: Livingston, West Lothian

The Midlothian Bulls were a basketball team, first based in Livingston, Scotland, later in Kirkliston to the west of Edinburgh. The team's history starts in 1989, following the withdrawal of the MIM Livingston team owned by businessman David Murray that competed in the British Basketball League. Both teams share a "crossover" history; the MIM team competed in the Scottish National League for two more years following their withdrawal from the BBL; the Bulls then continued in the success of their predecessor, winning numerous Scottish Cup and league titles. In 1997, the Bulls merged with the Dalkeith Saints to form the Midlothian Bulls, winning the league and cup once more. The team played their final game at the end of the 2000–01 season.

== Notable players ==
Note: Flags indicate national team eligibility at FIBA-sanctioned events. Players may hold other non-FIBA nationalities not displayed.

Criteria

To appear in this section a player must have either:

- Set a club record or won an individual award while at the club
- Played at least one official international match for their national team at any time
- Played at least one official NBA match at any time.

- (United Kingdom) Iain MacLean

== Record in European competition ==
Season	Competition	Round	Opponent	Home	Away	Aggregate
1989-90	FIBA European Champions Cup	First round	(Denmark) Skovlund	86-59	62-74	160-121
1989-90	FIBA European Champions Cup	Round of 16	(Croatia) Split Jugoplastika	84-97	122-65	149-219

== See also ==
- Livingston
- Dalkeith Saints
- Scottish Basketball Championship
- Scottish Cup (basketball)
