= Paisley B.C. =

- Founded: 1962; 64 years ago
- History: Penillee B.C. (1962–1972); Paisley B.C. (1972–1983); Scottish Pride (1983–1985); Paisley B.C. (1985–1988); Rangers B.C. (1988–1989); Paisley B.C. (1989-2006); PSG Gators B.C. (2006–xxxx); Reformed; Paisley B.C. (2015–present)
- Location: Paisley, Scotland
- Team colors: Black and white
- Championships: 1 Scottish League; 2 Scottish Cup
Home	Away

Paisley B.C. is a basketball club, founded in 1962 in Penilee on the southwestern edge of Glasgow, Scotland and now playing in Paisley, Scotland.

== History ==
The club founded as Penilee B.C. in Penilee a suburb of Glasgow winning three years after the founding the Scottish Cup with repeating youth teams in 1970 and 1975. In 1972 the club moved to Paisley, west of Scotland and won the national title in 1979 and two Scottish Cups in 1977 and 1978. In these years Paisley participated to the editions of the FIBA European Cup Winner's Cup in 1973-74 meeting Sparta Bertrange and of FIBA Korać Cup in 1974-75 meeting YMCA España from Madrid.

Paisley participated at the beginning of the Scottish Men's National League in 1969 until the 2000/01 season, but decline during those years led to the merger in 2006 with the Glasgow Gators club, to form the PSG Gators or briefly Paisley Gators. After the merger with the Gators the club moved into the regional league of Strathclyde League Basketball Association.

== Glasgow Rangers BC ==
In 1988, Paisley BC joined forces with the newly formed Glasgow Rangers BC (formerly Kingston BC). The club adopted the Rangers name and supplied players into the British Basketball League. Kevin Cadle lead the Falkirk-based team to a record of W18 L2 to win the BBL. During that season, David Murray purchased the parent football club and withdrew his funding at the end of the 88/89 season. This led to the BBL franchise returning to Kingston and Paisley BC reverting to its former name.

== Honours & achievements ==
Scottish League

- Winners (1): 1978-79

Scottish Cup

- Winners (2): 1976–77, 1977–78

British Basketball League

- Winners (1): 1988–89

== Record in European competition ==
Season	Competition	Round	Opponent	Home	Away	Aggregate
1973-74	FIBA European Champions Cup	First round	(Luxembourg) Sparta Bertrange	51-64	93-105	144-169
1974-75	FIBA Korać Cup	First round	(Spain) YMCA España	61-96	53-123	114-219

== See also ==
- Scottish Men's National League
