= Livingston (basketball) =

- League: Scottish Division 2 (1977–1978); Scottish Division 1 (1978–1987); BBL (1987–1989); Scottish Division 1 (1989–1990)
- Established: 1977
- Folded: 1991
- History: Edinburgh; 1977–1987; Livingston; 1987–1991
- Arena: Meadowbank Arena (1977–1987); Forum Arena (1987–1990)
- Location: Livingston, West Lothian
- Team colours: Royal Blue and White
- Ownership: David Murray

Livingston was a professional basketball team that was based in Livingston, Scotland. The team was founded in 1977, under the name Edinburgh, by steel magnate David Murray, and was backed by a sponsorship from his company, Murray International Metals. Using the name Murray International or MIM Livingston, they went on to be one of the most successful clubs in Scottish basketball history, playing first in Edinburgh, and then later moving to Livingston.

== History ==
During the height of its success, Livingston were Scottish National League Champions seven times between 1979 and 1987. The club was founded by members of the British Basketball League, a professional league established in 1987 by leading clubs from England and Scotland. Playing out of the newly built 3,000-seat Forum Arena, Livingston were successful in their inaugural season and with an 81–72 victory over regular season champions Portsmouth, were winners of the first Carlsberg League Championship Final.

In 1988 Murray acquired Rangers Football Club and inherited plans to form a 'sporting club' as the previous owner had bought Carlsberg League club Kingston for £100,000 and moved them to Glasgow. The Glasgow Rangers basketball team made their first appearance alongside Livingston in the 1988–89 season, becoming the league's second Scottish club. Rangers dominated the campaign, pipping Livingston to the regular season title and then beating them in the final of the Championship Play-offs, winning 89–86. Livingston also finished as runners-up in the NatWest League Trophy, losing 89–81 to Bracknell in the Final.

Despite the success of his two basketball teams, Murray was rumoured to have had a fall out with the basketball authorities in 1989 over a proposal to have both teams playing at The Forum Arena on alternate weekends, meaning a home game would be staged every week. The move was blocked and so Murray withdrew his financial support. The Rangers team was sold and moved back to Kingston-upon-Thames in 1989, whilst the Livingston club briefly returned to the Scottish League before becoming the Livingston Bulls.

== Notable players ==
Note: Flags indicate national team eligibility at FIBA-sanctioned events. Players may hold other non-FIBA nationalities not displayed.

Criteria

To appear in this section a player must have either:

- Set a club record or won an individual award while at the club
- Played at least one official international match for their national team at any time
- Played at least one official NBA match at any time.

- (United Kingdom) Bobby Archibald
- (United States) Alton Byrd
- (United States) Alan Cunningham
- (United States) Vic Fleming

== Record in European competition ==
Win Loss

| Season | Competition | Round | Opponent | Home | Away | Aggregate |
|---|---|---|---|---|---|---|
| 1978-79 | FIBA Korać Cup | First round | (England) Stockport Belgrade | 84-83 | 70-73 | 154-156 |
| 1980-81 | FIBA European Champions Cup | Group Stage | (Netherlands) EBBC | 73-67 | 106-64 | |
| 1980-81 | FIBA European Champions Cup | Group Stage | (Slovakia) Inter Slovnaft | 75-63 | 80-76 | |
| 1980-81 | FIBA European Champions Cup | Group Stage | (Sweden) Hageby | 94-80 | 82-85 | |
| 1981-82 | FIBA European Champions Cup | Group Stage | (Spain) FC Barcelona | 80-104 | 116-90 | |
| 1981-82 | FIBA European Champions Cup | Group Stage | (France) ASVEL | 67-81 | 87-79 | |
| 1981-82 | FIBA European Champions Cup | Group Stage | (Hungary) Honvéd | 76-72 | 88-82 | |
| 1982-83 | FIBA European Champions Cup | First round | (Switzerland) Fribourg Olympic | 74-78 | 77-71 | 145-155 |
| 1983-84 | FIBA European Champions Cup | First round | (Finland) Torpan Pojat | 100-85 | 82-89 | 189-167 |
| 1983-84 | FIBA European Champions Cup | Second round | (Spain) FC Barcelona | 93-94 | 91-85 | 178-185 |
| 1984-85 | FIBA European Champions Cup | First round | (Belgium) Oostende | 80-76 | 89-79 | 159-165 |
| 1985-86 | FIBA European Champions Cup | First round | (Spain) Real Madrid | 72-76 | 75-65 | 137-151 |
| 1986-87 | FIBA European Champions Cup | First round | (Italy) Milan | 83-101 | 83-83 | 166-184 |
| 1987-88 | FIBA European Champions Cup | First round | (Germany) Saturn Köln | 88-91 | 98-82 | 170-189 |
| 1988-89 | FIBA Korać Cup | First round | (Netherlands) Den Helder | 77-73 | 93-87 | 164-166 |
| 1989-90 | FIBA European Champions Cup | First round | (Denmark) Skovlund | 86-59 | 62-74 | 160-121 |
| 1989-90 | FIBA European Champions Cup | Round of 16 | (Croatia) Split Jugoplastika | 84-97 | 122-65 | 149-219 |

== See also ==
- Midlothian Bulls
- British Basketball League
