= 2021 in the Philippines =

- Decades: 2000s; 2010s; 2020s
- See also: List of years in the Philippines; films; music; television; sports

2021 in the Philippines details events of note that have occurred in the Philippines in 2021. The COVID-19 pandemic, which largely defined 2020, continued into 2021.

== Incumbents ==
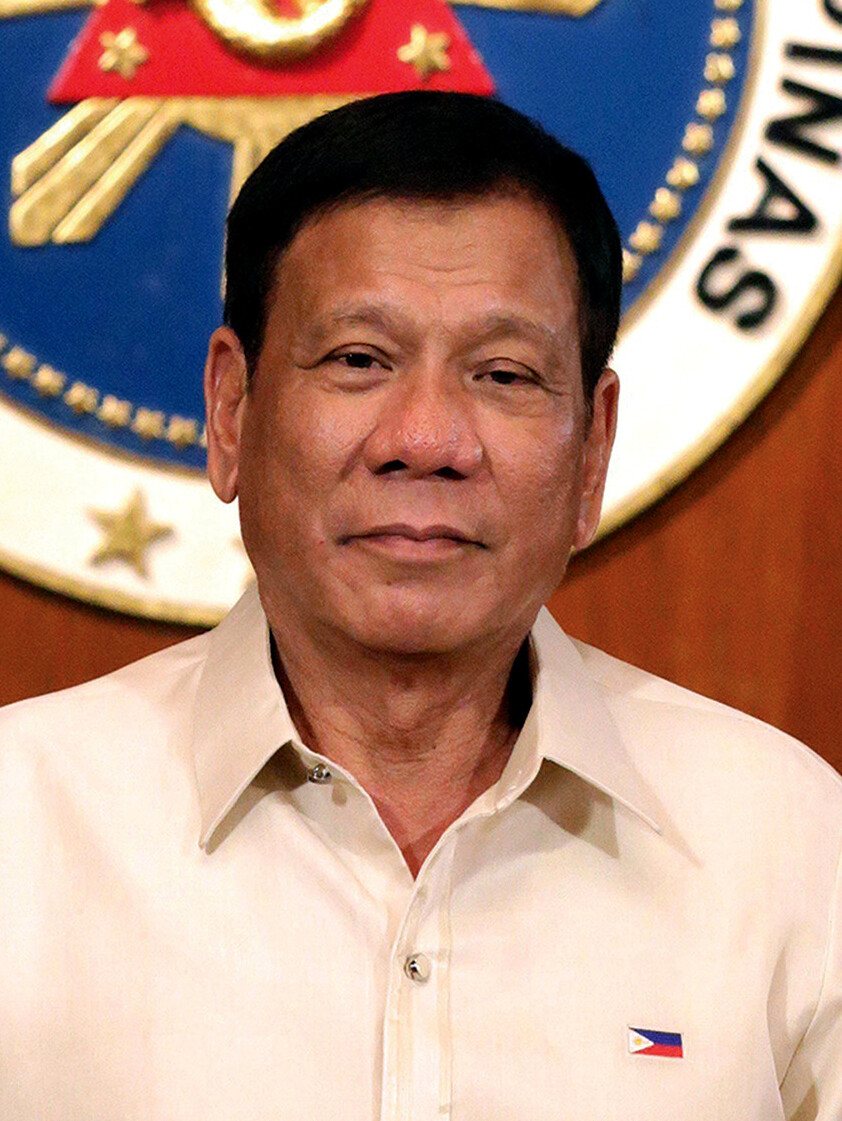
Rodrigo R.
Duterte

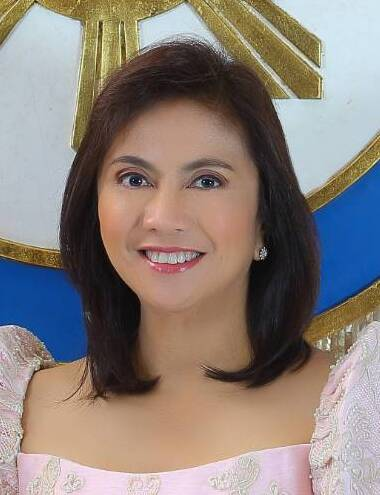
Leni G. Robredo

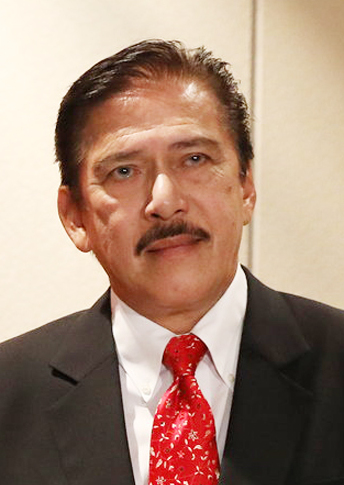
Vicente C.
Sotto III

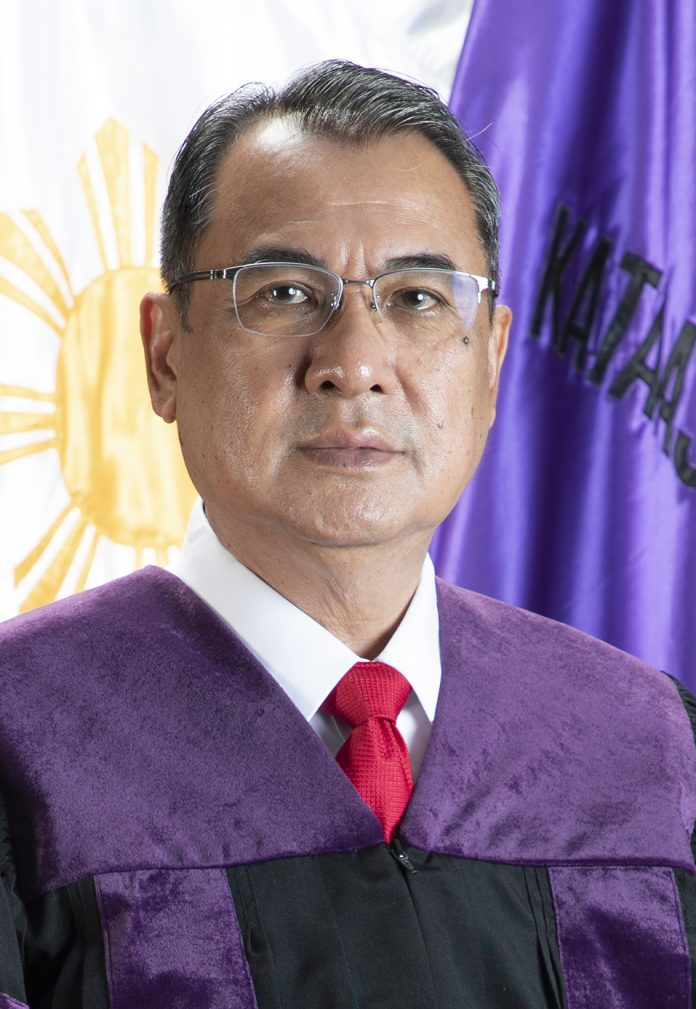
Alexander G.
Gesmundo

- President: Rodrigo Duterte (PDP–Laban)
- Vice President: Leni Robredo (Liberal)
- Congress (18th):
  - Senate President: Tito Sotto (NPC)
  - House Speaker: Lord Allan Velasco (PDP–Laban)
- Chief Justice:
  - Diosdado Peralta (until March 27)
  - Estela Perlas-Bernabe (acting), (March 27 – April 5)
  - Alexander Gesmundo (from April 5)

== Ongoing events ==
- COVID-19 pandemic
  - Pharmally scandal (from July)
- 2021 Quincentennial Commemorations in the Philippines, which includes the 500th anniversaries of the introduction of Christianity in the Philippines, the Philippines' part in Magellan's circumnavigation of the world, and the victory of Lapulapu's forces in the Battle of Mactan.

== Events ==
=== January ===
- January 4 – President Duterte signs Republic Act No. 11510, institutionalizing the alternative learning system (ALS).
- January 18 – The Department of National Defense announces its unilateral termination of its 1989 accord with the University of the Philippines which took effect three days earlier over claims that the New People's Army is recruiting members in the universities' campuses. The agreement limited the entry of police and military of the national government in the University of the Philippines' campuses.

=== February ===
- February 5 – Businesswoman Janet Lim-Napoles, former Cagayan de Oro representative Constantino Jaraula, and three others are convicted by the Sandiganbayan of graft and malversation of public funds, in relation to the Priority Development Assistance Fund scam.
- February 7: – 2021 Davao Del Sur earthquake: A 6.0 M_{w} earthquake strikes Mindanao, injuring 14 and causing damage.
- February 16:
  - The Supreme Court, sitting as the Presidential Electoral Tribunal, unanimously dismisses the electoral protest of defeated vice presidential candidate and former senator Bongbong Marcos against Vice President Leni Robredo.
  - President Duterte grants amnesty to members of the Moro National Liberation Front, Moro Islamic Liberation Front, and the Rebolusyonaryong Partido ng Manggagawa ng Pilipinas/Revolutionary Proletarian Army/Alex Boncayao Brigade who have committed crimes in pursuit of their political beliefs, and who would agree to surrender their weapons.
- February 17 – Senator Leila de Lima is acquitted, due to insufficient evidence, in one of the three drug cases filed against her.
- February 26 – President Duterte signs Republic Act No. 11524, creating a trust fund for the country's coconut farmers.
- February 28 – The Philippines receives its first shipment of COVID-19 vaccines, with the arrival of 600,000 doses of China-based drugmaker Sinovac Biotech vaccine CoronaVac.

=== March ===
- March 1 – The Department of Health and National Task Force Against COVID-19 start its vaccination campaign with 600,000 doses of donated COVID-19 vaccines from Sinovac. Philippine General Hospital director Gerardo Legaspi becomes the first person in the country to be legally inoculated with CoronaVac.
- March 13 – Residents of Palawan, except Puerto Princesa, vote in a plebiscite to disapprove a law that would divide Palawan into three separate provinces.
- March 21 – The Philippines files its first formal diplomatic protest with regard to the presence of about 220 Chinese fishing boats moored at Whitsun Reef in the Spratly Islands as early as March 7. The incident at Whitsun Reef caused diplomatic tensions between China and the Philippines with the latter suspecting the ships to be part of a militia and that China plans to use the ship to secure control over the disputed reef.
- March 27 – President Duterte approves the IATF's recommendation to place the Greater Manila Area under enhanced community quarantine from March 29 to April 4, later it was extended until April 11.

=== April ===
- April 30 – PhiSys becomes available for online registration. The Philippine Statistics Authority receives more than 40,000 registration requests on the first minutes of the pilot launch.

=== May ===
- May 8 – The Bangsamoro Islamic Freedom Fighters occupy the public market of Datu Paglas, Maguindanao.
- May 11 – President Duterte places the Philippines under a state of calamity for a period of one year due to the African swine fever (ASF) outbreak.
- May 14 – The government's Anti-Terrorism Council publicly releases separate resolutions formally declaring Communist Party of the Philippines founder Joma Sison and 18 other alleged communist leaders, as well as 10 leaders of Islamic extremist groups, as terrorists.
- May 25 – St Joseph College of Bulacan closes.
- May 27:
  - Republic Act 11550 is signed into law, approving the province of Maguindanao to be split into two provinces: Maguindanao del Norte and Maguindanao del Sur pending approval in a plebiscite.
  - President Duterte signs Republic Act No. 11521, extending the electricity lifeline rates for the poor for a period of 50 years.

=== June ===
- June 21 – The Sandiganbayan convicts six retired officers of the Philippine National Police, including former chief Jesus Verzosa, of graft in connection with the procurement of at least ₱131-million worth of rubber boats and outboard motors in 2009. The decision is affirmed in 2022.

=== July ===
- July 4 – A Lockheed C-130 Hercules aircraft of the Philippine Air Force (PAF) crashes in Patikul, Sulu, killing 53 people. The incident is the deadliest aviation accident involving the Armed Forces of the Philippines.
- July 19 – The Anti-Terrorism Council publicizes a June 23 resolution formally designating the National Democratic Front as a terrorist organization.
- July 30 – President Duterte revokes his order to terminate the Philippines' Visiting Forces Agreement with the United States. The termination process was initiated in February 2020 by notifying the United States. The termination was to take effect after six months but was pushed back multiple times.

=== August ===
- August 16 – A daylong encounter between soldiers of the Armed Forces of the Philippines and members of the New People's Army in Dolores, Eastern Samar results in the deaths of at least 19 rebels.

=== October ===
- October 3 – The International Consortium of Investigative Journalists and assorted media partners publish a set of 11.9 million documents leaked from 14 financial services companies known as the Pandora Papers, revealing offshore financial activities which listed several current and former Philippine officials and personalities that included Secretary of Transportation Arthur Tugade and former COMELEC chairman Andres Bautista.
- October 8 – Journalist Maria Ressa, the founder and chief executive officer of the online news website Rappler, is awarded the 2021 Nobel Peace Prize by the Norwegian Nobel Committee, along with Russian journalist Dmitry Muratov, "for their efforts to safeguard the freedom of expression" with regards to freedom of the press. Ressa is the first individual Filipino Nobel Prize laureate and the first Filipino Nobel Peace Prize laureate.
- October 12 – The Antipolo Regional Trial Court convicts three members of the Reform the Armed Forces Movement for the 1986 killing of labor leader Rolando Olalia and unionist Leonor Alay-ay.

=== December ===
- December 10 – President Duterte signs Republic Act 11596 into law, criminalizing child marriage in the Philippines.
- December 16–18 – Typhoon Rai (Odette) makes landfall in the southern Philippines causing at least 407 deaths and ₱33.2 billion worth of damage to infrastructure and agriculture. Pres. Duterte declares a state of calamity in six regions on December 21 as a response to the typhoon's impact.
- December 31 – Republic Act 11641 is signed into law which creates the Department of Migrant Workers (DMW) for Overseas Filipino Workers (OFWs). The department reorganizes Philippine Overseas Employment Administration, the Department of Labor and Employment's International Labor Affairs Bureau and all Overseas Labor Offices, the National Reintegration Center for OFWs, and the National Maritime Polytechnic.

== Holidays ==
On July 31, 2020, the government announced at least 18 Philippine holidays for 2021 as declared by virtue of Proclamation No. 986, series of 2020. On February 26, 2021, in an effort to stimulate economic recovery in the wake of the COVID-19 pandemic, President Duterte signed Proclamation No. 1107 reducing the number of special non-working holidays and declaring November 2, December 24, and December 31 as "special working days" instead.

=== Regular ===
- January 1 – New Year's Day
- April 1 – Maundy Thursday
- April 2 – Good Friday
- April 9 – Araw ng Kagitingan (Day of Valor)
- May 13 – Eid'l Fitr (Feast of Ramadan)
- June 12 – Independence Day
- July 20 – Eid'l Adha (Feast of Sacrifice)
- August 30 – National Heroes Day
- November 30 – Bonifacio Day
- December 25 – Christmas Day
- December 30 – Rizal Day

=== Special (Non-working) ===
- February 12 – Chinese New Year
- February 25 – 1986 EDSA Revolution
- April 3 – Black Saturday
- May 1 – Labor Day
- August 21 – Ninoy Aquino Day
- November 1 – All Saints Day
- November 2 – Special working holiday
- December 8 – Feast of the Immaculate Conception
- December 24 – Special working holiday
- December 31 – Special working holiday (in observance of New Year's Eve celebrations)

== Business and economy ==
- January 7 – The Security and Exchange Commission announces that it allows Investree to commence commercial operations. The firm becomes the first crowdfunding portal to be allowed to operate from the Philippines.
- January 28 – The Philippine Statistics Authority announces that the country's GDP contracted by 9.5% in 2020, the biggest GDP contraction since World War II.
- March 8 – Dito Telecommunity commences commercial operations in selected cities in Visayas and Mindanao, entering the country's telecommunications industry.
- March 25 – The Overseas Filipino Bank is given the first digital-only bank license in the Philippines, by the Monetary Board of the Bangko Sentral ng Pilipinas, the country's central bank.
- May 26 – Monde Nissin makes the largest initial public offering in the Philippines announcing that it has raised ₱48.6 billion in its debut in the Philippine Stock Exchange. The IPO was filed on March 4.

== Entertainment and culture ==
- March 27 – Samantha Bernardo wins the title of 1st runner-up in the Miss Grand International 2020 pageant which was held in Bangkok, Thailand.
- April 5 – Kelley Day wins the title of 1st runner-up in the Miss Eco International 2020 pageant which was held in Egypt.
- May 17 – Rabiya Mateo finishes in the Top 21 at Miss Universe 2020 in Florida, USA.
- July 11 – Hannah Arnold wins Miss International Philippines 2021, Samantha Alexandra Panlilio wins Miss Grand International Philippines 2021, Cinderella Faye Obenita wins Miss Intercontinental Philippines 2021, and Maureen Montagne wins Globe Philippines 2021.
- August 8 – Naelah Alshorbaji wins Miss Philippines Earth 2021 via virtual coronation. She represents the Philippines at Miss Earth 2021 on November 21.
- August 21 – Dindi Pajares finishes in the Top 12 at Miss Supranational 2021 in Malopolska, Poland.
- September 30 – Beatrice Gomez of Cebu City wins Miss Universe Philippines 2021 and represents the Philippines at Miss Universe 2021 on December 13. Gomez is the first openly lesbian to win the pageant.

== Sports ==
- January 25 – Volleyball: An election is held to determine the set of officials to head the Philippine National Volleyball Federation, a new national sports association (NSA) for volleyball formed in a bid to end the dispute between the Philippine Volleyball Federation and the Larong Volleyball sa Pilipinas over which organization is the legitimate NSA for volleyball in the country.
- August 8 – The Philippine Olympic delegation finishes 2020 Summer Olympics campaign with 50th overall leaderboard after won 1 gold, 2 silver, and 1 bronze medal. The biggest haul in the country's history in the Games and the top ranking in Southeast Asia.

== Deaths ==
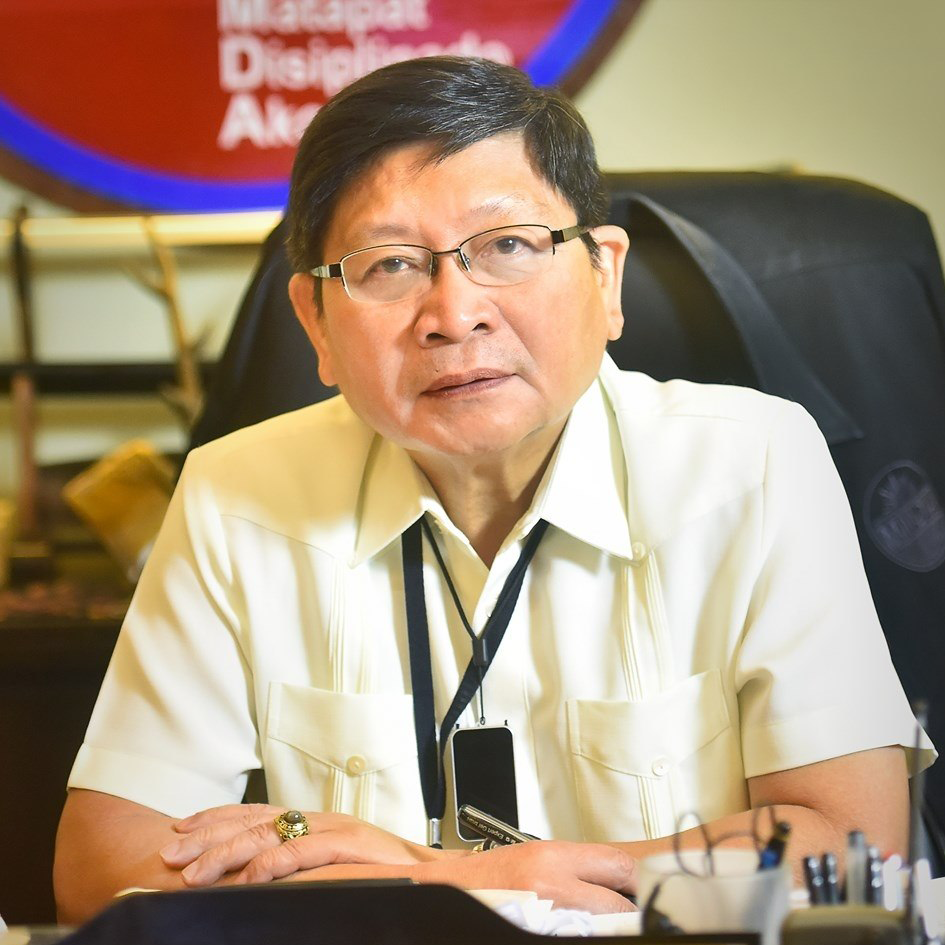
Danilo Lim

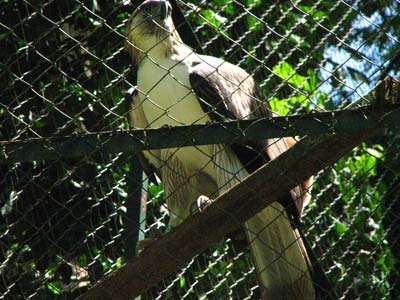
Pag-asa

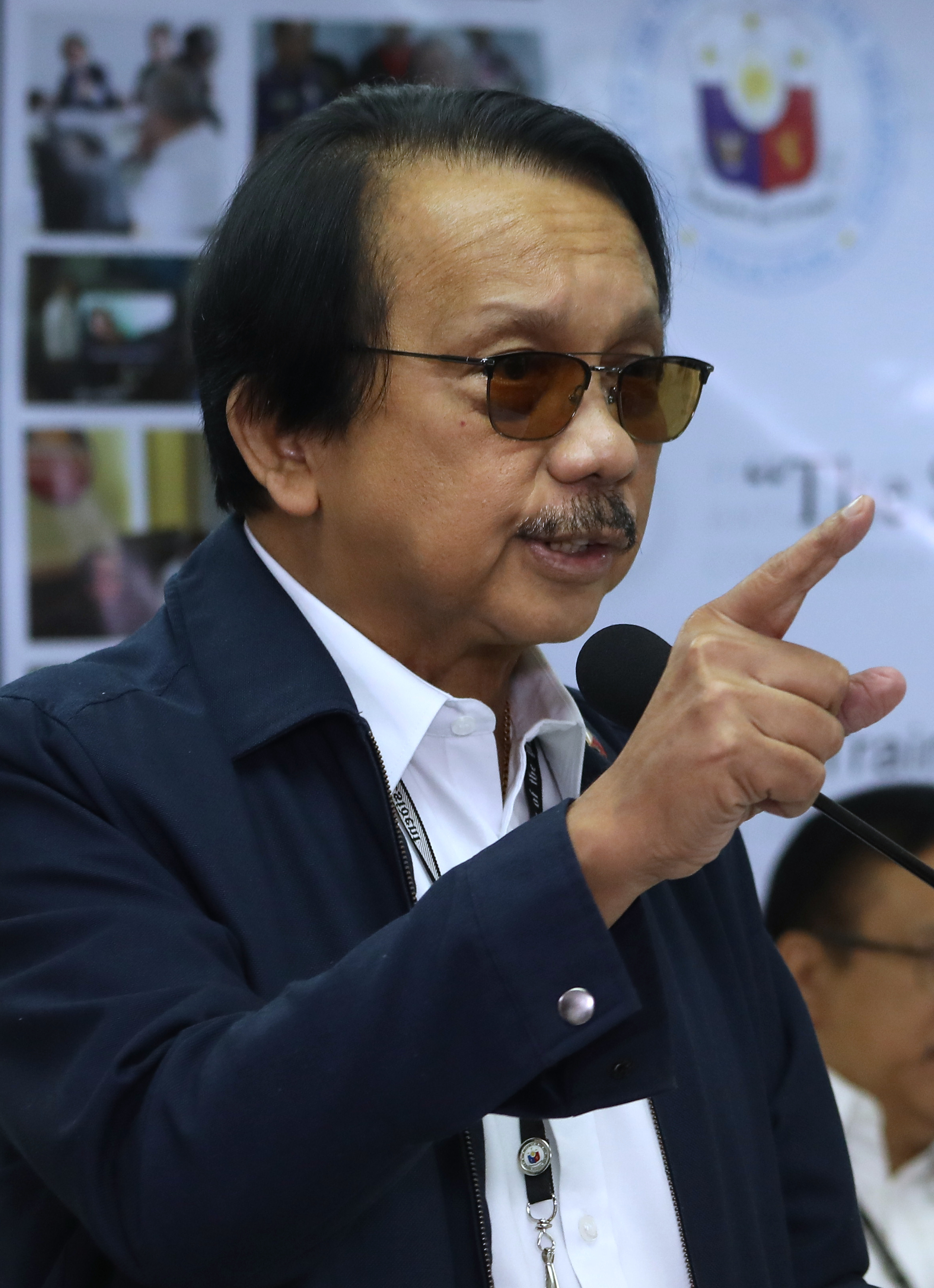
Dante Jimenez

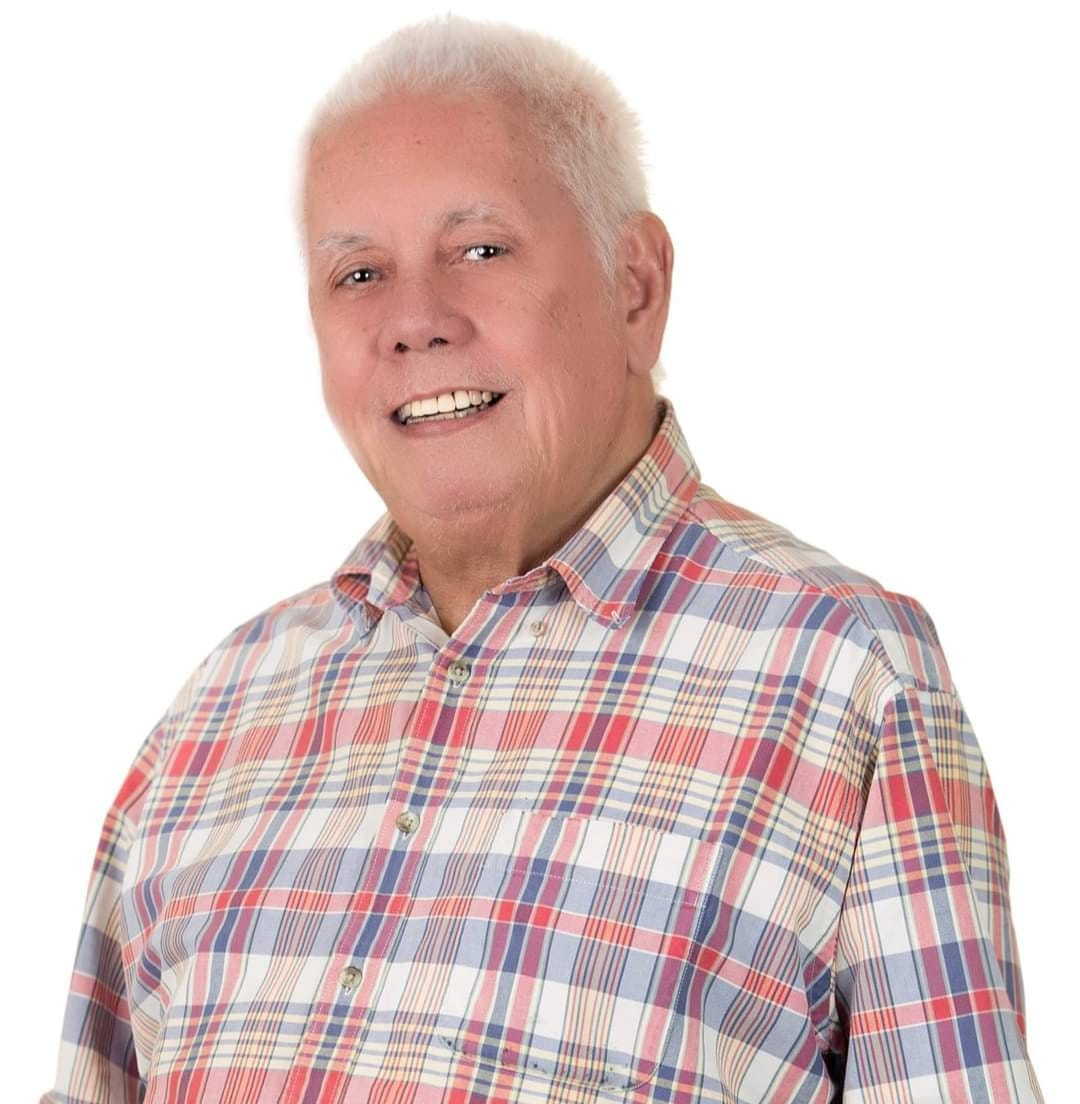
John Henry Osmeña

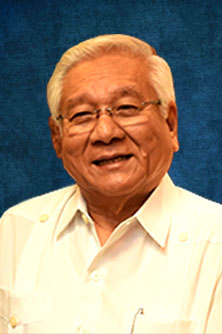
Ayong Maliksi

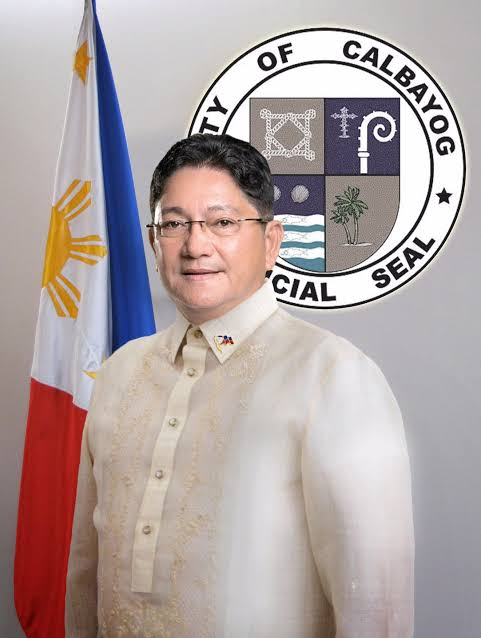
Ronaldo Aquino

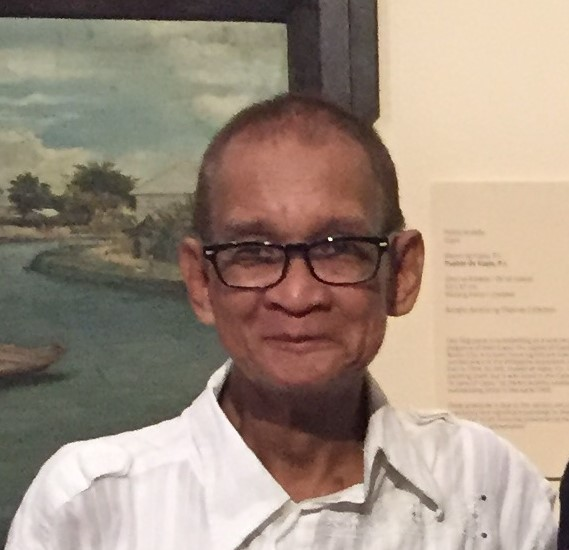
Santiago Albano Pilar

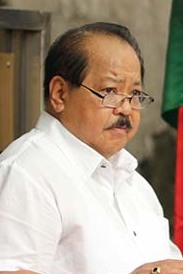
Ludovico Badoy

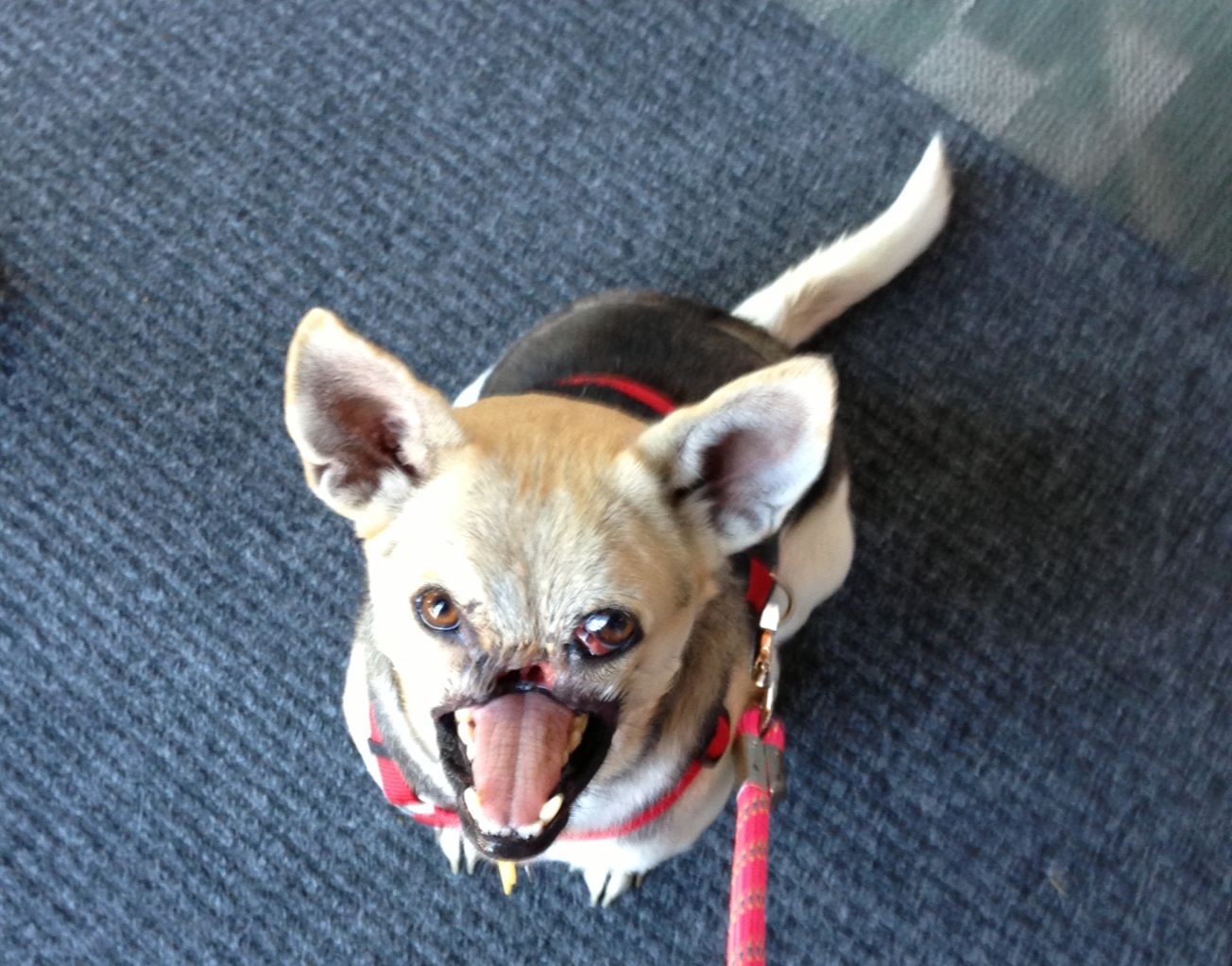
Kabang

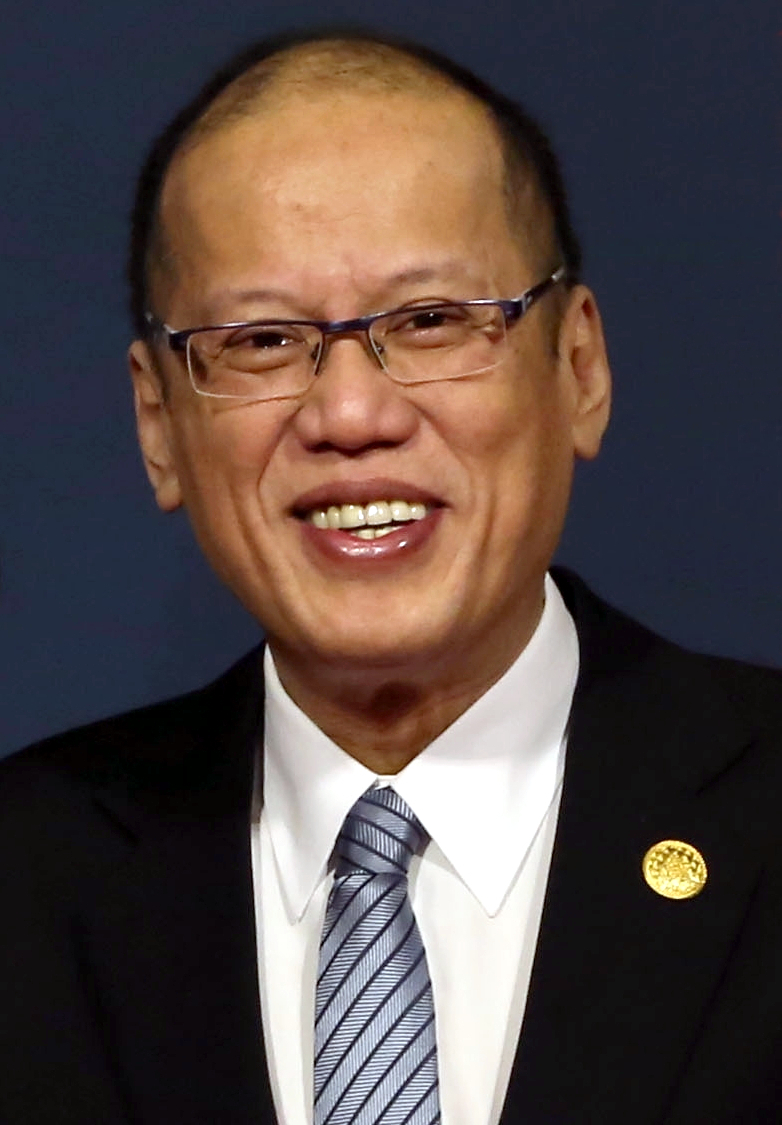
Benigno Aquino III

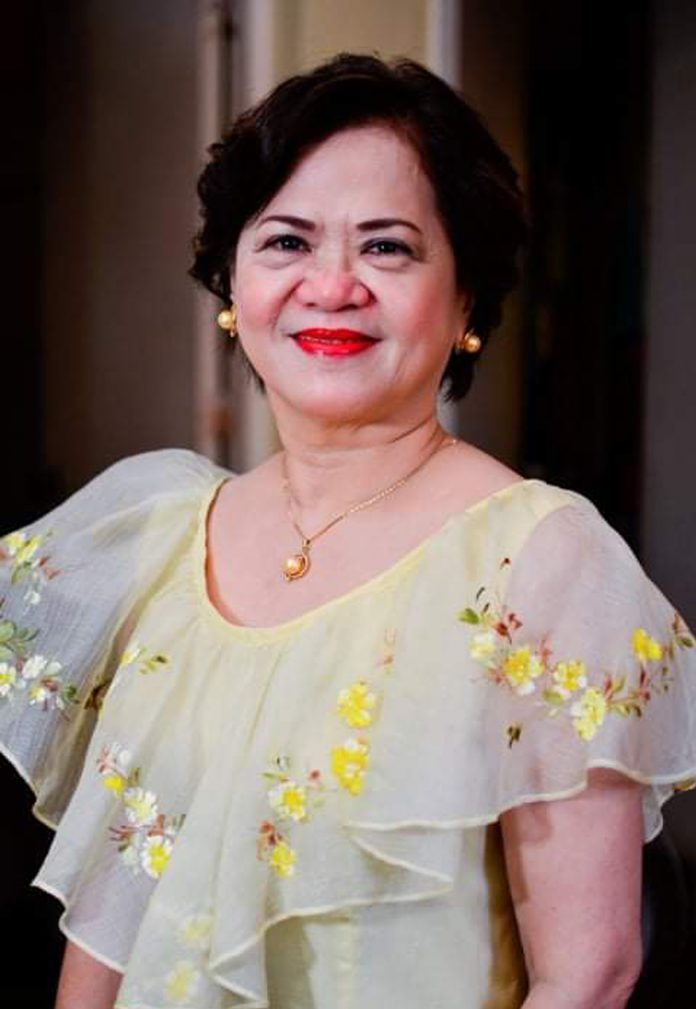
Priscilla Baltazar-Padilla

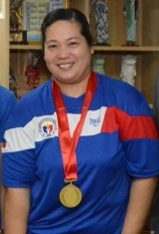
Josephine Medina

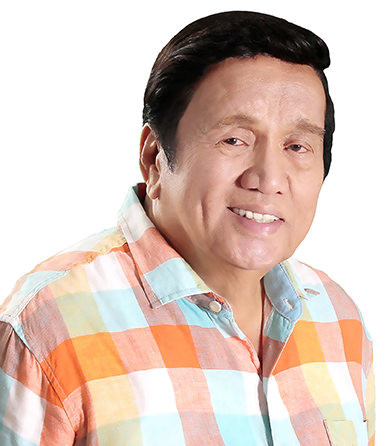
Luis Villafuerte

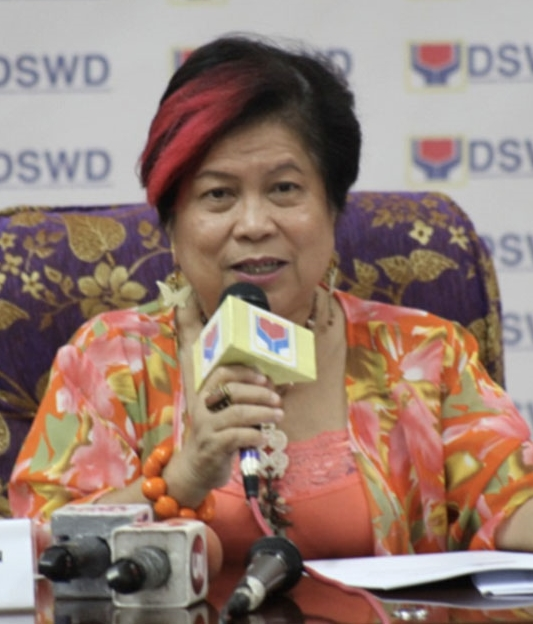
Dinky Soliman

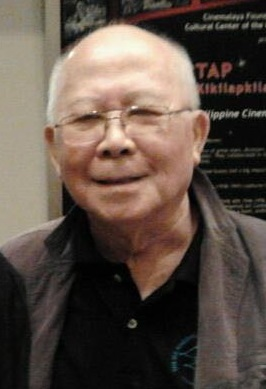
Bienvenido Lumbera

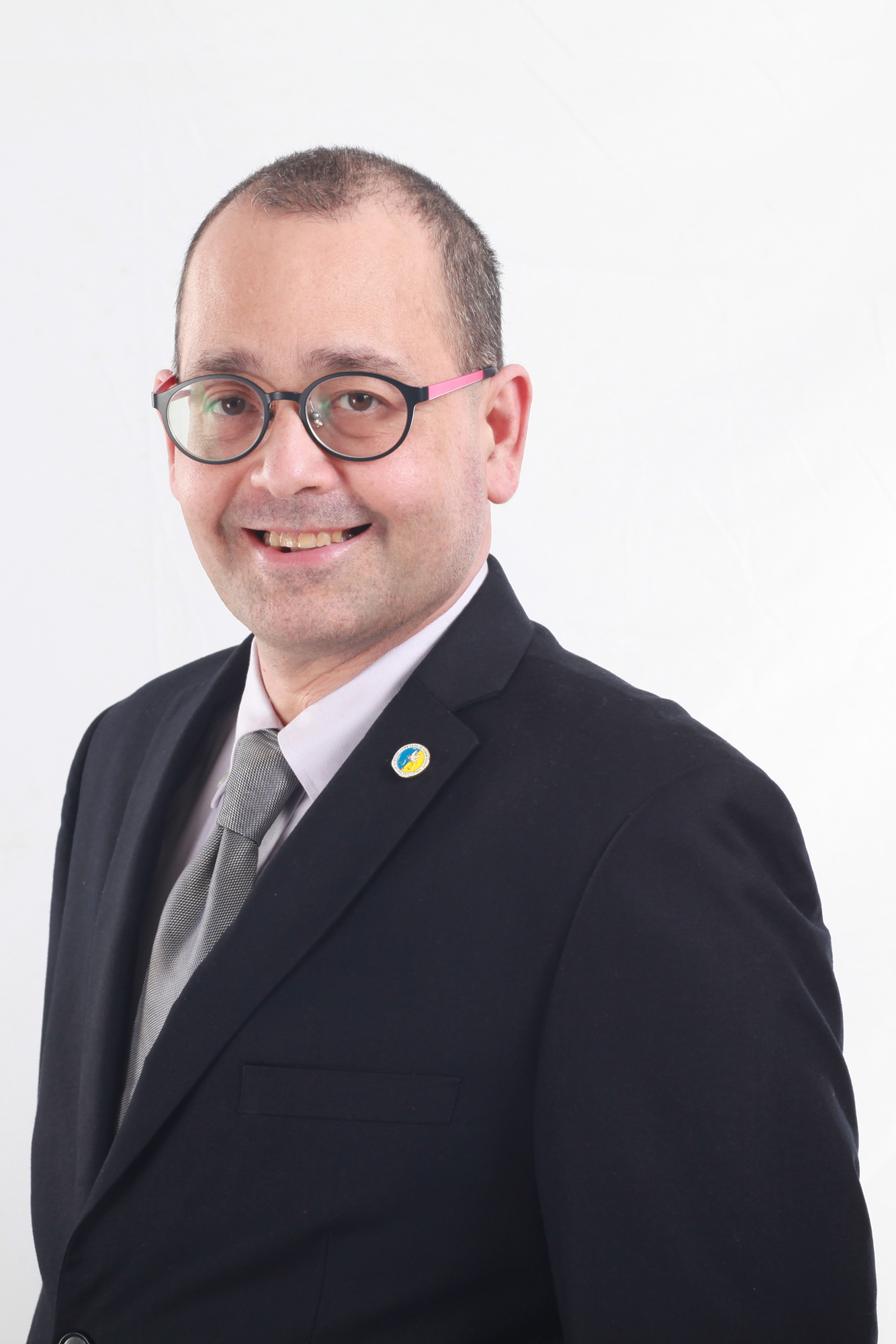
Chito Gascon

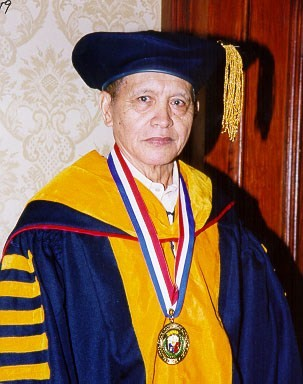
Ramon Barba

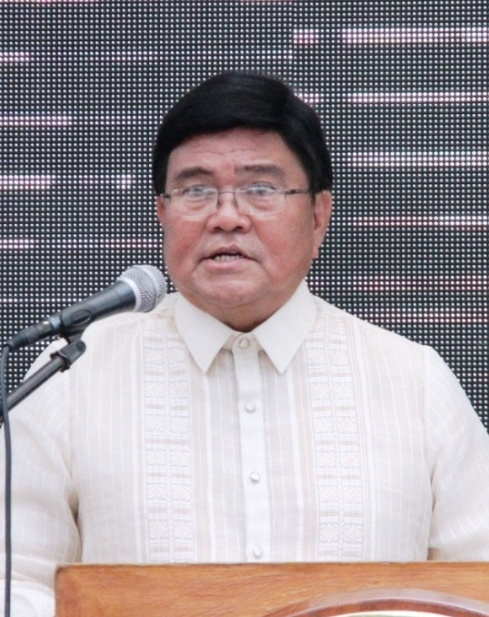
Edgardo Labella

=== January ===
- January 1 – Christine Dacera (b. 1997), flight attendant of PAL Express
- January 6:
  - Danilo Lim (b. 1955), chairman of the Metropolitan Manila Development Authority
  - Pag-asa (b. 1992), first Philippine eagle to be bred and hatched in captivity
- January 7 – Reynaldo Umali (b. 1957), former representative of Oriental Mindoro's 2nd congressional district
- January 20 – Abdul Sahrin, Deputy Chief Minister of Bangsamoro
- January 23 – Tony Ferrer (b. 1934), former actor
- January 26 – Yabing Masalon Dulo (b. 1914), weaver and Manlilikha ng Bayan awardee
- January 29 – Dante Jimenez (b. 1952), chairman of Presidential Anti-Corruption Commission
- January 31 – Victor Ziga (b. 1945), former senator, Albay assemblyman and cabinet minister

=== February ===
- February 1 – Naty Crame-Rogers (b. 1922), actress
- February 2 – John Henry Osmeña (b. 1935), former senator
- February 10 – Eli Soriano (b. 1947), preacher and international televangelist
- February 17 – Jacinto Cayco (b. 1924), swimmer and referee
- February 24 – Ayong Maliksi (b. 1938), former governor of Cavite and mayor of Imus, Cavite
- February 25 – Jose R. Gullas (b. 1934), former representative of Cebu's 1st congressional district
- February 26 – Tarhata Alonto-Lucman (b. 1926), first woman governor of Lanao del Sur

=== March ===
- March 6:
  - Joaquin Bernas (b. 1932), Jesuit lawyer, professor and writer; member of the 1986 Constitutional Commission, former president of the Ateneo de Manila University
  - Ben Farrales (b. 1932), fashion designer
- March 8 – Ronaldo Aquino (b. 1961), mayor of Calbayog, Samar
- March 20 – Fidelis Atienza (b. 1918), nun and propagator of Good Shepherd ube jam
- March 27 – Antonio Sanchez (b. 1949), former mayor of Calauan, Laguna; convicted for the murders of Eileen Sarmenta and Allan Gomez
- March 30 – Claire dela Fuente (b. 1958), businesswoman and singer

=== April ===
- April 6 – Nestor Torre (b. 1942), film writer, director and journalist
- April 12 – Santiago Albano Pilar, (b. 1946), Art historian and writer
- April 15 – Adelino Sitoy (b. 1936), former mayor of Cordova, Cebu and Presidential Legislative Liaison Office Secretary
- April 18 – Ludovico Badoy (b. 1951), former mayor of Cotabato City and executive director of National Historical Commission of the Philippines
- April 22 – Wencelito Andanar (b. 1948), former undersecretary of Department of the Interior and Local Government and special envoy to Malaysia
- April 23 – Victor Wood (b. 1946), singer
- April 25 – Genebert Basadre (b. 1984), boxer and SEA Games gold medalist
- April 28 – Celso Dayrit (b. 1951), former president of the Philippine Olympic Committee and the International Fencing Federation

=== May ===
- May 4 – Ricky Lo (b. 1946), entertainment columnist
- May 17 – Kabang (b. 2008), hero dog
- May 23 – Baby Barredo (b. 1941), theater actress and producer, co-founder of Repertory Philippines
- May 26 – Arturo Luz (b. 1926), painter, sculptor and printmaker, National Artist of the Philippines
- May 28 – Resurreccion Acop (b. 1947), representative of Antipolo's 2nd congressional district

=== June ===
- June 10 – Douglas Cagas (b. 1943), governor of Davao del Sur and former member of the Davao del Sur's at-large congressional district
- June 23 – Shalala (b. 1960), radio-television personality and comedian
- June 24 – Benigno Aquino III (b. 1960), 15th President of the Philippines (2010–2016), former senator (2007–2010) and former member of the Tarlac's 2nd congressional district (1998–2007)

=== July ===
- July 7 – Nonoy Espina (b. 1962), journalist, media rights advocate, and former chair of the National Union of Journalists of the Philippines
- July 11 – Jeci Lapus (b. 1953), former chief of Local Water Utilities Administration and former representative of Tarlac's 3rd congressional district
- July 19 – Lito Osmeña (b. 1938), former governor of Cebu (1988–1992)
- July 23 – Wally Gonzalez (b. 1950), Juan de la Cruz Band guitarist
- July 24 – Elly Pamatong (b. 1943), former presidential aspirant
- July 25 – Joseph Israel Laban (b. 1971) filmmaker and journalist
- July 27 – Orestes Ojeda (b. 1956), actor
- July 29 – Domingo Landicho (b. 1939), writer and playwright
- July 30 – Manuel Morato (b. 1933), former chair of MTRCB and board of director of Philippine Charity Sweepstakes Office
- July 31 – Herminio Aquino (b. 1949), former representative of Tarlac's 3rd congressional district

=== August ===
- August 12:
  - Jose P. Perez (b. 1946), former Associate Justice of the Supreme Court of the Philippines
  - Haydée Coloso-Espino (b. 1937), swimmer
- August 14 – Virginia R. Moreno (b. 1923), writer
- August 15:
  - Roque Ferriols (b. 1924), philosopher
  - Mohammad Zainoden Bato (b. 1945), Moro Islamic Liberation Front and Bangsamoro Parliament member
- August 18:
  - Jose Abueva (b. 1928), former President of the University of the Philippines
  - Pablo P. Garcia (b. 1925), former governor of Cebu (1995–2004)
- August 24 – Nelly Restar (b. 1939), sprinter
- August 26 – Rafael Hechanova (b. 1928), former basketball player
- August 27 – Priscilla Baltazar-Padilla (b. 1958), former Associate Justice of the Supreme Court of the Philippines
- August 31 – Noemi "Mahal" Tesorero (b. 1974), comedian

=== September ===
- September 1 – Leopoldo Serantes (b. 1962), bronze-medalist Olympic boxer
- September 2 – Josephine Medina (b. 1970), bronze-medalist Paralympic table tennis player
- September 3 – Nestor Soriano (b. 1953), sailor
- September 8 – Luis Villafuerte (b. 1935), former governor of Camarines Sur
- September 13 – Ruben T. Reyes (b. 1939), former Associate Justice of the Supreme Court of the Philippines
- September 15 – Renee "Alon" dela Rosa (b. 1959), singer-songwriter
- September 28 – Bienvenido Lumbera (b. 1932), poet, critic, dramatist, National Artist of the Philippines and recipient Ramon Magsaysay Award for Journalism, Literature and Creative Communications
- September 30:
  - Adelina Santos Rodriguez (b. 1920), former mayor of Quezon City
  - Leticia Gempisao (b. 1952) softball player

=== October ===
- October 9 – Chito Gascon (b. 1964), chairman of the Commission on Human Rights
- October 10 – Ramon Barba (b. 1939), National Scientist of the Philippines
- October 14 – Vic Sison (b. 1936), football player

=== November ===
- November 16 – Heber Bartolome (b. 1948), musician
- November 19 – Edgardo Labella (b. 1951), mayor of Cebu City
- November 21 – Bert de Leon (b. 1947), television director

=== December ===
- December 19 – Ato Badolato (b. 1946), basketball coach

== See also ==
=== Country overviews ===
- Philippines
- History of the Philippines
- History of the Philippines (1986–present)
- Outline of the Philippines
- Government of the Philippines
- Politics of the Philippines
- List of years in the Philippines
- Timeline of Philippine history

=== Related timelines for current period ===
- 2021
- 2021 in politics and government
- 2020s
