= Universities and Colleges Athletic League =

Collegiate athletic association in the Philippines

- Upcoming season or competition: UCAL Season 9
- Founded: 2016; 10 years ago (as UCBL); 2023; 3 years ago (as UCAL)
- No. of teams: 10
- Country: Philippines
- Venues: Metro Manila and Calabarzon
- Broadcasters: Solar Sports; Smart Sports

The Universities and Colleges Athletic League (UCAL) is an athletic association of ten universities and colleges across Metro Manila and Calabarzon in the Philippines. The UCAL dates back to 2016 when the organization established the Universities and Colleges Basketball League (UCBL). In 2023, it added volleyball and esports to the mix, with the UCBL's member schools forming the basis of the UCAL.

PG Flex Linoleum serve as the association's title sponsors, hence it is also referred to as the Universities and Colleges Athletic League–PG Flex Linoleum.

== History ==
=== Establishment ===
The UCAL organization as a whole began in 2016 under president Franklin Evidente, when it founded the UCBL, a basketball league which initially featured seven member institutions in its inaugural season. Those members were Bulacan State University (BulSU), Centro Escolar University (CEU), Colegio de San Lorenzo (CDSL), Diliman College (DC), Olivarez College (OC), Technological Institute of the Philippines (TIP), and University of Batangas (UB).

The league then expanded over its first few seasons with Lyceum of the Philippines University – Batangas (LPU–B) joining in 2017, Philippine Christian University – Dasmariñas (PCU–D) and St. Joseph College of Bulacan (SJC) in 2018, and the National College of Business and Arts (NCBA) in 2019. However, it also saw some institutions depart from the league as BulSU and CDSL departed in 2018 followed by SJC in 2019. The COVID-19 pandemic caused the league to temporarily go on hiatus before resuming with Season 5 in 2022. Guang Ming College (GMC) joined the league while NCBA and TIP didn't make a return in the resumption of play.

=== Formation of the UCAL ===
As Season 6 approached, Manila Central University (MCU) and Philippine Women's University (PWU) joined as new league members, but the league itself would later undergo an evolution. The UCAL organization added volleyball and esports to go alongside the existing basketball competition, marking the first multi-sport season and the formation of the UCAL, with the UCBL becoming the UCAL's basketball championship. For Season 7, it will add two more institutions in Immaculada Concepcion College (ICC) and WCC Aeronautical & Technological College (WCC) alongside a new streetdance competition. On the other hand, Guang Ming College will take a leave of absence. Season 8 will see two more sports added to the calendar in badminton and table tennis, while WCC departed after one season.

== Member schools ==
The UCAL is currently composed of ten member schools. Seven of them are based in Metro Manila while three are based in Calabarzon.

Locations of member schools based in Metro Manila	Locations of member schools based in Calabarzon

School	Location	Founded	Nickname	Membership
Centro Escolar University	San Miguel, Manila	1907 as Centro Escolar de Señoritas	Scorpions	2016–present
Diliman College	Diliman, Quezon City	1998 as Diliman Computer Technology Institute	Blue Dragons	2016–present
Immaculada Concepcion College	Caloocan	1984	Blue Hawks	2024–present
Lyceum of the Philippines University – Batangas	Batangas City, Batangas	1966 as Lyceum of Batangas	Pirates	2017–present
Manila Central University	Caloocan	1904 as Escuela de Farmacia del Liceo de Manila	Supremos	2023–present
Olivarez College	Parañaque	1976 as Olivarez School of Nursing	Sea Lions	2016–present
Philippine Christian University – Dasmariñas	Dasmariñas, Cavite	1946 as Philippine Christian College	Dolphins	2018–present
Philippine Women's University	Malate, Manila	1919 as Philippine Women's College	Patriots	2023–present
University of Batangas	Batangas City, Batangas	1946 as Western Philippine Colleges	Brahmans	2016–present

=== Former member schools ===
School	Location	Founded	Nickname	Membership
Bulacan State University	Malolos, Bulacan	1904 as Bulacan Trade School	Gold Gears	2016–2018
Colegio de San Lorenzo	Project 8, Quezon City	1987 (closed in 2022)	Griffins	2016–2018
Guang Ming College	Tagaytay, Cavite	2014	Flying Dragons	2022–2024
National College of Business and Arts	Cubao, Quezon City	1967	Wildcats	2019–2020
St. Joseph College of Bulacan	Santa Maria, Bulacan	1996	Taurus	2018–2019
Technological Institute of the Philippines	Quiapo, Manila	1962	Engineers	2016–2020
WCC Aeronautical & Technological College	Caloocan	2005	Skyhawks	2024–2025

== List of championships ==
=== Volleyball ===
The league first held its volleyball championship in Season 6 as one of two new additions that season. It is divided into two divisions: men's and women's.

==== List of champions ====
Season (Year)	Men's		Women's		Ref.
Season (Year)	Champion	Runner-up	Champion	Runner-up	Ref.
6 (2023–24)	PCU–D Dolphins	LPU–B Pirates	UB Lady Brahmans	LPU–B Lady Pirates	
7 (2024–25)	UB Brahmans	ICC Blue Hawks	ICC Lady Blue Hawks	UB Lady Brahmans	

=== Esports ===
Alongside volleyball, the league also first held its esports championship in Season 6. Currently, the only game contested in the esports championship is Mobile Legends: Bang Bang. The men's division was first held in Season 6 while the women's division will be first held in Season 7.

==== List of champions ====
Season (Year)	Men's		Women's		Ref.
Season (Year)	Champion	Runner-up	Champion	Runner-up	Ref.
6 (2023–24)	UB Brahmans	LPU–B Pirates	—N/a		
7 (2024–25)					

=== Streetdance ===
The league's streetdance competition was first held in Season 7 as its opening event.

=== Badminton ===
The league's badminton championship will be first held in Season 8.

=== Table tennis ===
The league's table tennis championship will be first held in Season 8.
