= National Collegiate Athletic Association – South =

Philippines regional sports body

- Current season, competition or edition: Season 25
- Founded: 1999
- No. of teams: 11
- Country: Philippines
- Related competitions: National Collegiate Athletic Association, University Athletic Association of the Philippines

The National Collegiate Athletic Association – South (NCAA South), established in 1999, is a regional athletic association for colleges and universities in the National Capital Region and Calabarzon regions in the Philippines. Currently, the NCAA-South has eleven member schools: First Asia Institute of Technology and Humanities, Colegio de San Juan de Letran Calamba, De La Salle Lipa, Lyceum of the Philippines University–Batangas, Philippine Christian University– Dasmariñas, San Pablo Colleges, Emilio Aguinaldo College Cavite, University of Perpetual Help System Laguna, San Beda College Alabang, TRACE College and University of Batangas.

Currently the NCAA South has six member schools that have ties to members in the NCAA, namely Colegio de San Juan de Letran, De La Salle–College of Saint Benilde, Emilio Aguinaldo College, Lyceum of the Philippines University, San Beda University, and University of Perpetual Help System DALTA. Meanwhile, mother school Philippine Christian University used to compete in the NCAA until 2009.

Meanwhile, its current 24th season was hosted by University of Batangas and was opened at Carmelo Q. Quizon Gymnasium on February 24, 2023.

== History ==
The National Collegiate Athletic Association – South (NCAA South) was first established as an offshoot league of the NCAA Metro Manila in 1999 with its first four member schools, University of Perpetual Help System Laguna, Colegio De San Juan De Letran Calamba, Philippine Christian University–Dasmarinas, and San Beda College Alabang.

Throughout the years, NCAA South had grown with 11 member schools: First Asia Institute of Technology and Humanities, Colegio De San Juan De Letran - Calamba, De La Salle Lipa, Lyceum of the Philippines University–Batangas, Philippine Christian University– Dasmariñas, San Pablo Colleges, Emilio Aguinaldo College- Cavite, University of Perpetual Help System Laguna, San Beda College Alabang, TRACE College and University of Batangas.

In 2010, the University of Batangas joined the NCAA South as a probationary member.

In the 15th season, the league officially welcomed its new member school, Emilio Aguinaldo College–Cavite and in the 19th season, TRACE College.

Don Bosco Technical College Mandaluyong and Saint Francis of Assisi College–Alabang dropped from the league after the 17th season.

== NCAA South members ==
National Collegiate Athletic Association – South current member schools
Colors	School	Founded	Nickname		Location	NCAA Affiliate	Membership
Colors	School	Founded	Seniors	Juniors	Location	NCAA Affiliate	Membership
	Colegio de San Juan de Letran Calamba	1979	Knights	Squires	Calamba, Laguna	Letran Knights	1999–present
	De La Salle Lipa	1962	Green Stallions		Lipa, Batangas	Benilde Blazers (Note: Indirect affiliation through De La Salle Philippines.)	
	Emilio Aguinaldo College Cavite	1998	Vanguards		Dasmariñas, Cavite	EAC Generals	2013–present
	First Asia Institute of Technology and Humanities	2000	Bravehearts		Tanauan, Batangas	—N/a	
	Lyceum of the Philippines University–Batangas	1966	Pirates	Junior Pirates	Batangas City, Batangas	Lyceum Pirates	
	Philippine Christian University–Dasmariñas	1946 as Philippine Christian College	Dolphins	Baby Dolphins	Dasmariñas, Cavite	—N/a (Note: Formerly affiliated with Philippine Christian University in Manila when the university was still a member school of the NCAA from 1999 to 2009.)	1999–present
	San Beda College Alabang	1972 as Benedictine Abbey School	Red Lions	Red Cubs	Muntinlupa, Metro Manila	San Beda Red Lions	1999–present
	San Pablo Colleges	1947	Ravens		San Pablo, Laguna	—N/a	
	TRACE College	1986	Stallions		Los Baños, Laguna	—N/a	2017–present
	University of Batangas	1946 as Western Philippine Colleges	Brahmans		Batangas City, Batangas	—N/a	2011–present
	University of Perpetual Help System Laguna	1996	Saints		Biñan, Laguna	Perpetual Altas	1999–present

== Summary ==
Season	Year	Host school	Overall champions	
Season	Year	Host school	Junior Division	Senior Division
1st	1999	University of Perpetual Help System DALTA - Calamba		
2nd	2000	Colegio de San Juan de Letran Calamba		
3rd	2001	Philippine Christian University–Dasmariñas		
4th	2002	San Beda College Alabang		
5th	2003	Lyceum of the Philippines University–Batangas		
6th	2004	De La Salle Lipa		
7th	2005	University of Perpetual Help System Laguna		
8th	2006	Colegio de San Juan de Letran Calamba		
9th	2007	Don Bosco Technical College Mandaluyong		
10th	2008	Philippine Christian University–Dasmariñas		
11th	2009	San Pablo Colleges		
12th	2010	First Asia Institute of Technology and Humanities	UPHSL Saints	
13th	2011	San Beda College Alabang	UPHSL Saints	DLSL Chevrons
14th	2012	Lyceum of the Philippines University–Batangas	UPHSL Saints	SFAC Alabang Doves
15th	2013	De La Salle Lipa	UPHSL Saints	DLSL Chevrons
16th	2014	University of Perpetual Help System Laguna	UPHSL Saints	UPHSL Saints
17th	2015	Colegio de San Juan de Letran Calamba	UPHSL Saints	SFAC Alabang Doves
18th	2016	First Asia Institute of Technology and Humanities	UPHSL Saints	SFAC Alabang Doves
19th	2017	San Pablo Colleges	UPHSL Saints	UPHSL Saints
20th	2018	Philippine Christian University–Dasmariñas	UPHSL Saints	DLSL Green Stallions
21st	2019	San Beda College Alabang	Tournament abandoned due to COVID-19 pandemic.	
22nd	2020	Not held due to COVID-19 pandemic.		
23rd	2021-22	De La Salle Lipa	DLSL Green Stallions	DLSL Green Stallions
24th	2023	University of Batangas	DLSL Green Stallions	UB Brahmans
25th	2024	Emilio Aguinaldo College Cavite	DLSL Green Stallions	UPHSL Saints
26th	2025	TRACE College	—N/a	
27th	2026	University of Batangas	—N/a	
28th	2027	Philippine Christian University–Dasmariñas		

== See also ==
- NCAA Season 91
- UAAP Season 78
- NAASCU Season 15
- Fr. Bellarmine Baltasar Gymnasium
