= 2021 in Philippine sports =

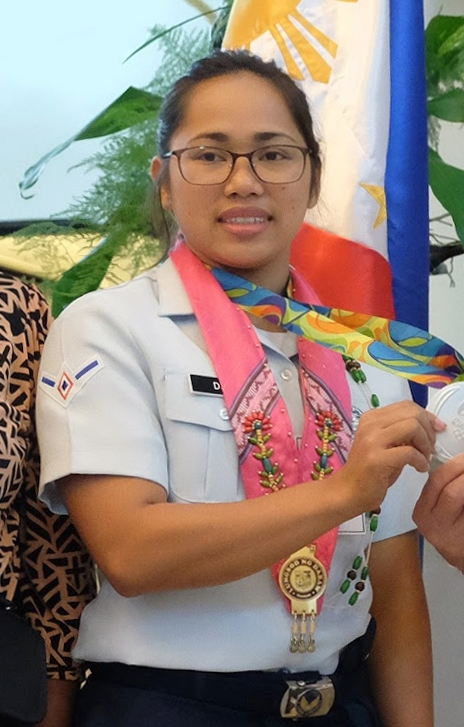
Weightlifter Hidilyn Diaz won the Philippines' first-ever Olympic gold medal at the 2020 Summer Olympics in Tokyo.

The following is a list of notable events and developments that are related to Philippine sports in 2021.

== Events ==
=== Athletics ===
- August 28 – EJ Obiena finishes second place at the pole vault event at Diamond League in Paris, France after breaking his personal best and national record for the Philippines at 5.91 meters.

=== Badminton ===
- September 26 – Aries Delos Santos and Gerald Sibayan claimed 2021 Yonex Open NVBC men's doubles title after defeating Shlok Ramchandran and Victor Lai the finals, 21–15, 12-21 and 21–17.

=== Basketball ===
- March 21 – Davao Occidental Tigers claims 2021 MPBL finals championship after defeating San Juan Knights 3–1 in a best-of-5 series.
- May 18 – President Rodrigo Duterte signs into law the naturalization of Ateneo Blue Eagles player Angelo Kouame, allowing him to play for the Philippines men's national basketball team.
- July 16 – The 46th season of Philippine Basketball Association officially opens at the Ynares Sports Arena in Pasig.
- August 11 – Mindanao finalist Basilan Peace Riders claims 2021 Pilipinas Vismin Super Cup Southern Championship title after defeating Visayas finalist KCS Computer Specialists – Mandaue City 3–0 in the best-of-5 series.
- October 1 – The Philippines women's national basketball team finishes 2021 FIBA Women's Asia Cup campaign at 7th place after defeating India 74–70 to retain the Division A for the next tournament.
- October 28 – Filbasket's inaugural season opens officially at the Subic Bay Gymnasium.
- October 29 – The TNT Tropang Giga claims 2021 PBA Philippine Cup championship after defeating Magnolia Hotshots 4–1 in best-of-seven series.
- November 20 – The inaugural season of the PBA 3x3 league was officially open at the Ynares Sports Arena in Pasig.
- November 22 – AICC Manila claims the Filbasket Subic Championship title after defeating the San Juan Knights in the finals 2–1 in best-of-three series.
- December 9 – The Maharlika Pilipinas Basketball League was granted as professional status by the Games and Amusements Board.
- December 23 – The Basilan Peace Riders claims 2021 MPBL Invitational title after defeating Nueva Ecija Rice Vanguards at overtime score 83–80.

=== Boxing ===
- May 30 – Nonito Donaire claims WBC bantamweight championship after defeating Nordine Oubaali via knockout on fourth round.
- August 3 – Nesthy Petecio claims the silver medal of the women's featherweight event at the 2020 Summer Olympics in Tokyo after losing to Japan's Sena Irie via a unanimous decision in the final. Petecio becomes the first Filipino female boxer to win an Olympic medal for the Philippines.
- August 5 – Eumir Marcial claims the bronze medal of the men's middleweight event at the 2020 Summer Olympics in Tokyo after losing to Ukraine's Oleksandr Khyzhniak via a split decision in the semifinals.
- August 7 – Carlo Paalam claims the silver medal of the men's flyweight event at the 2020 Summer Olympics in Tokyo after losing to Great Britain's Galal Yafai via a split decision in the finals.
- August 15 – John Riel Casimero retains WBO bantamweight championship after defeating Cuba's Guillermo Rigondeaux via split decision.
- August 22:
  - Mark Magsayo claims WBC featherweight championship after defeating Julio Ceja via knockout on tenth round.
  - Manny Pacquiao defeated by Cuba's Yordenis Ugas via unanimous decision to retain his opponent's WBA welterweight championship.
- September 29 – Manny Pacquiao officially announced his retirement after 26 years of professional boxing career.
- October 31 – Jonas Sultan retains WBO bantamweight title after defeating Puerto Rico's Carlos Caraballo via unanimous decision.
- December 11 – Donnie Nietes retains WBO International super-flyweight title after ended a split draw with Dominican Republic's Norberto Jimenez.
- December 12 – Nonito Donaire retains WBC bantamweight championship after defeating fellow Filipino Reymart Gaballo via knockout on fourth round.

=== Chess ===
- April 22 – Eugene Torre, the first Asian Grandmaster, becomes the first Asian male to be inducted into the World Chess Hall of Fame in the United States.

=== Cue sports ===
- September 19 – Carlo Biado claims 2021 U.S. Open Pool Championship title after defeating Singapore's Aloysius Yapp at score 13–8.

=== Football ===
- June 14 – United City F.C. set an agreement with New Clark City as their home venue, renaming them as United Clark F.C. for the upcoming 2021 Philippines Football League.
- July 2 – President Rodrigo Duterte signs into law the naturalization of United City player Bienvenido Marañón, allowing him to play for the Philippines national football team.
- November 19 – Kaya F.C.–Iloilo claims 2021 Copa Paulino Alcantara title after defeating Azkals Development Team at score 1–0.

=== Golf ===
- June 7 – Yuka Saso claims the 2021 U.S. Women's Open title at The Olympic Club in San Francisco, California, becoming the first Filipino player to win a major golf championship.
- September 20 – Miguel Tabuena claims PGA Idaho Open at Quail Hollow Club in Idaho, United States.

=== Gymnastics ===
- September 23 – Carlos Yulo claims gold and bronze medal in 2021 All Japan Senior and Masters Gymnastics Championships in Yamagata, Japan.
- October 24 – Carlos Yulo claims gold and silver medal in 2021 World Artistic Gymnastics Championships in Kitakyushu, Japan.

=== Mixed Martial Arts ===
- September 24 – Joshua Pacio retains ONE strawweight championship after defeating Yosuke Saruta via knockout on first round at ONE Championship 143: Revolution.

=== Tennis ===
- January 24 – Alex Eala wins her first title in professional competition at the W15 Manacor round of the 2021 ITF Women's World Tennis Tour in Manacor, Spain, defeating Yvonne Cavallé Reimers of Spain, 5–7, 6–1, 6–2, in the final.

=== Volleyball ===
- March 28 – Jaja Santiago of the Ageo Medics becomes the first Filipino to win an international professional volleyball title, after her team wins the 2020–21 Japanese V.Cup title.
- July 17 – The 2021 Premier Volleyball League Open Conference was officially open in Laoag, Ilocos Norte.
- August 13 – Chery Tiggo 7 Pro Crossovers claims 2021 Premier Volleyball League Open Conference title after defeating Creamline Cool Smashers in a do-or-die best-of-three series.
- October 7 – The Choco Mucho and Rebisco PH finishes 6th and 7th place respectively at 2021 Asian Women's Club Volleyball Championship in Thailand.
- October 13 – The Rebisco PH finishes 2021 Asian Men's Club Volleyball Championship campaign at 9th place after defeating Sri Lanka's CEB Sports Club in 5 sets (25–14, 22–25, 25–18, 21–25, 15–11).
- November 25 – The F2 Logistics Cargo Movers claims 2021 PNVF Champions League for Women title after defeating Chery Tiggo 7 Pro Crossovers in three sets (25-20, 25–20, 25–22).
- December 4 – The Team Dasma Monarchs claims 2021 PNVF Champions League for Men title after defeating Go for Gold-Air Force Aguilas in four sets (19-25, 26–24, 25–18, 25–17).

=== Weightlifting ===
- July 26 – Hidilyn Diaz wins the Women's 55 kg event at the 2020 Summer Olympics in Tokyo, winning the country's first Olympic gold medal.

== Deaths ==
- January 10 – Alberto "Bert" Ortiz (b. 1959), former basketball player
- February 17 – Jacinto Cayco (b. c. 1924), swimmer and referee
- April 12 – Joselito "Joey" Ocampo (b. 1952), former basketball player
- April 25 – Genebert Basadre (b. 1984), boxer and SEA Games gold medalist
- April 26 – Mike Ochosa (b. 1965), sports analyst, writer, and entrepreneur
- August 12 – Haydée Coloso-Espino (b. 1937), swimmer
- August 26 – Rafael Hechanova (b. 1928), former basketball player
- September 1 – Leopoldo Serantes (b. 1962), bronze-medalist Olympic boxer
- September 2 – Josephine Medina (b. 1970), bronze-medalist Paralympic table tennis player
- September 22 – Mauricio "Moying" Martelino (b. 1935), former secretary-general of the Asian Basketball Confederation and chairman of the Philippine Volleyball Federation
- September 24 – Jerome Yenson (b. 1996), baseball player (Adamson Soaring Falcons, Philippines national baseball team)
- September 30 – Leticia Gempisao (b. 1952) softball player
- October 14 – Vic Sison (b. 1936), football player
- November 11 – Freddie Lazarito (b. 1955), football coach
- December 19 – Ato Badolato (b. 1946), basketball coach
- December 26 – Lawrence Chongson (b. 1964), basketball coach

== See also ==
- 2021 in the Philippines
- 2021 in sports
