= Colegio de San Juan de Letran Calamba =

Roman Catholic college in Laguna, Philippines

- Dalubhasaan ng San Juan de Letran Calamba (Filipino)
- Motto: Deus, Patria, Letran (Latin)
- Motto in English: God, Fatherland, Letran
- Type: Private non-profit Basic and Higher education institution
- Established: March 11, 1979; 47 years ago
- Religious affiliation: Roman Catholic (Dominican)
- Academic affiliations: PACUCOA, LACASA, CEAP, ASEACCU
- Chancellor: Very Rev. Fr. Gerard Timoner III, OP, SThL
- Rector: Rev. Fr. Roman Santos, OP
- Location: Ipil-ipil St., Bucal, Calamba City, Laguna, Philippines; 14°11′19″N 121°09′57″E
- Campus: Urban
- Alma Mater song: Himno del Colegio de Letran
- Patron Saint: St. John the Baptist
- Colors: Blue & red
- Nickname: Letran Knights
- Sporting affiliations: NCAA South, PRISAA
- Website: letran-calamba.edu.ph/

The Colegio de San Juan de Letran Calamba (CSJL Calamba; Filipino: Dalubhasaan ng San Juan de Letran Calamba), or simply Letran Calamba, is a private Catholic coeducational basic and higher education institution owned and run by the friars of the Order of Preachers in Calamba City, Laguna, Philippines.

Letran Calamba was given autonomous status by the Commission on Higher Education. Several of its program are accredited by Philippine Association of Colleges and Universities Commission on Accreditation (PACUCOA).

== History ==
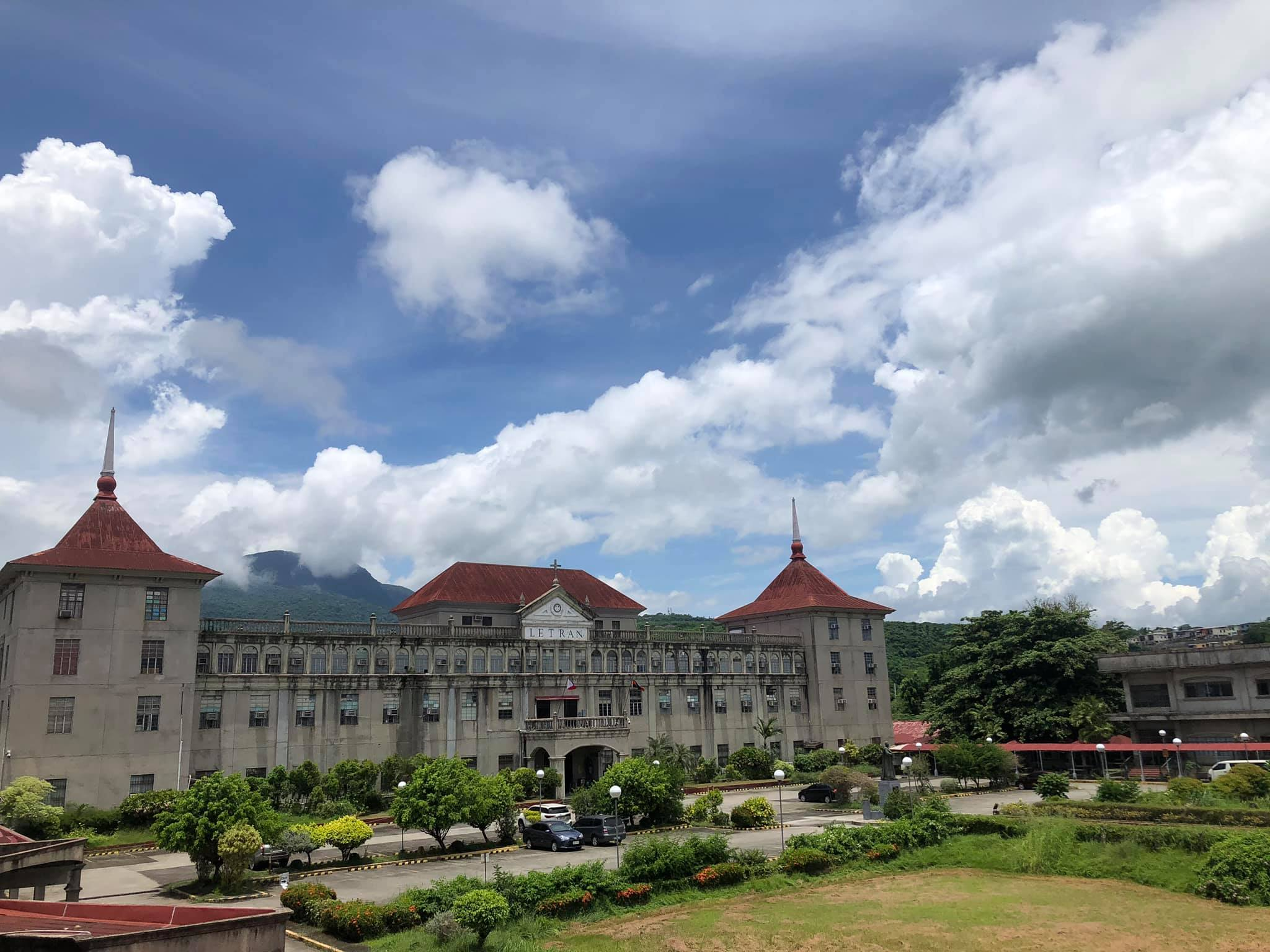
Facade of Letran Calamba in 2021

The Dominican Province of the Philippines, in an effort to decentralize its schools in Manila, planned to establish an extension school in the province. An 11-hectare tract of land, donated by the Philippine Sugar Estates Development Corporation, along the foothills of Mt. Makiling in Bucal, Calamba City, Laguna, was chosen as the site.

Letran Calamba was founded on March 11, 1979. It started as an extension campus by Letran Manila under the supervision of Rev. Fr. Regino Cortez, OP, the rector and president of the Intramuros campus at that time.

On August 7, 1986, Letran Calamba finally gained its autonomy from Letran Manila with the installation of Rev. Fr. Tamerlane Lana, OP, as its first rector and president.

In November 2008, Letran Calamba has started its application for the Philippine Association of Colleges and Universities Commission on Accreditation (PACUCOA) accreditation.

In December 2017, Letran Calamba was awarded by PACUCOA with the second highest number of accredited programs in the Philippines.

In December 2018, the Colegio was awarded by PACUCOA with the First Science High School (Special Science Curriculum), to have been granted Level Ill Reaccredited Status in Region IV and the College with the second highest number of accredited programs in the Philippines.

On April 28, 2025, Rev. Fr. Roman Santos, OP has been selected as the 11th rector and president of Letran Calamba.

== Official publications ==
- The Knight, the official publication of the collegiate department.
- The Squire, the official publication of the high school department.
- Ang Kabalyero, the official publication, in Filipino language, of the high school department.
- The Paladin, the official publication of the senior high school department.
- Ang Paladin, the official publication, in Filipino language, of the senior high school department.
- The Page, the official publication of the elementary department.
- Barangay Letran, the official publication of the administration.
- Lilok – Letran Calamba scholarly research journal.
- Ani – Letran Calamba undergraduate students research journal
