= UCAL basketball championship =

Basketball league in the Philippines

- Current season, competition or edition: UCAL Season 7 men's basketball tournament
- Sport: Basketball
- Founded: October 8, 2016
- First season: 2016
- Director: Bernard Yang, Carmelo Navarro, Willy Chan
- Commissioner: Horacio Lim
- No. of teams: 9
- Country: Philippines
- Most recent champion: Olivarez Sea Lions
- Broadcasters: Solar Sports; Smart Sports

The UCAL basketball championship is the basketball championship of the Universities and Colleges Athletic League (UCAL). It was first established as the Universities and Colleges Basketball League (UCBL) in 2016, with its inaugural season opening on October 8 of that year.

In 2024, the UCBL would become the basis of the UCAL when it became a fully-fledged collegiate association. The UCBL now operates as the UCAL's basketball championship.

== Background ==
The UCBL was established in 2016 by Universities and Colleges Athletic League, Inc. under president Franklin Evidente. The league put a focus on television coverage with the aim of giving its member institutions more exposure. The league also put officiating as another focal point, by implementing a stricter system. In Season 6, following the formation of the UCAL, the UCBL name was retired and is now referred to as the UCAL basketball championship.

== List of champions ==
The CEU Scorpions have the most championships out of all member schools with three while the Diliman Blue Dragons have the second-most with two. The Olivarez Sea Lions and San Lorenzo Griffins are the only other teams to win a championship with one each.

Season (Year)	Champion	Runner-up	Ref.
1 (2016–17)	CEU Scorpions	Olivarez Sea Lions	
2 (2017–18)	San Lorenzo Griffins	CEU Scorpions	
3 (2018–19)	Diliman Blue Dragons	Olivarez Sea Lions	
4 (2019–20)	Diliman Blue Dragons	Olivarez Sea Lions	
5 (2022–23)	CEU Scorpions	Olivarez Sea Lions	
6 (2023–24)	CEU Scorpions	Diliman Blue Dragons	
7 (2024–25)	Olivarez Sea Lions	PCU–D Dolphins	
8 (2025-26)	CEU Scorpions	Olivarez Sea Lions	

== Venues and media coverage ==
All games are held at the Paco Arena in Manila every Monday and Thursday, with the live telecast of the games are aired on Smart Sports through livestreaming coverage provided by Smart Communications.

== See also ==
- UAAP basketball championships
- NCAA basketball championships (Philippines)
- National Athletic Association of Schools, Colleges and Universities
