= University of Batangas =

Private university in Batangas, Philippines

- Pamantasan ng Batangas; Unibersidad ng Batangas; Universidad de Batangas
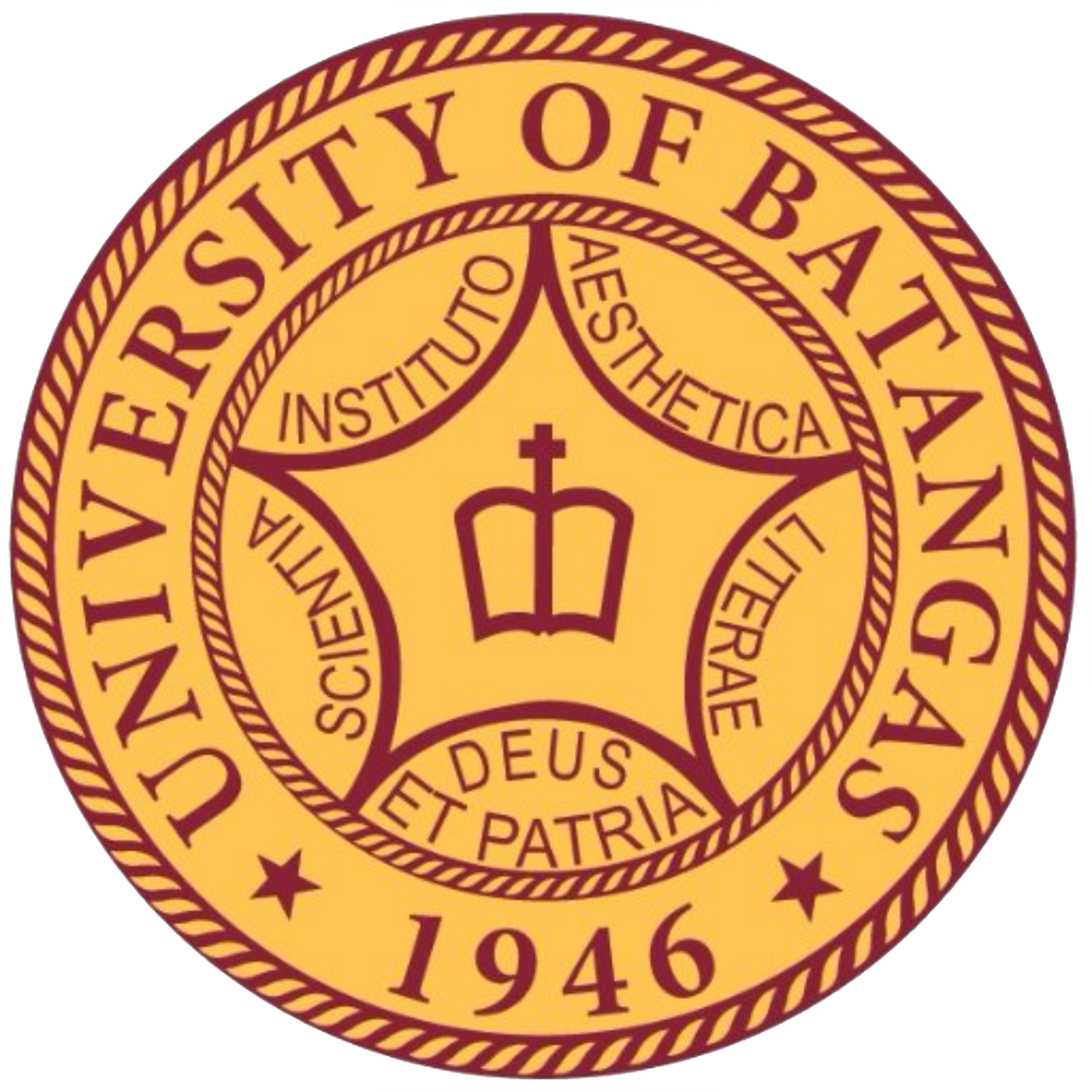
- Former name: Western Philippine Colleges (1946-1996)
- Motto: "Undeniably the Best" "University of Choice, University of Future"
- Type: Private coeducational non-sectarian basic and higher education institution
- Established: April 28, 1946; 80 years ago
- Founder: See list: Jesus Lorenzo Arguelles; Vicente R. Catapang; Juan Y. Javier; Francisco G. Perez; Roman L. Perez; Pablo C. Umali
- Religious affiliation: Non-sectarian
- Academic affiliations: PACUCOA
- Chairman: Jesus Victor V. Mayo
- President: Lily Marlene J. Hernandez
- President Emeritus: Hernando B. Perez
- Students: 14,000
- Location: Kumintang Ibaba, Hilltop, Batangas City, Batangas, Philippines; 13°45′50.18″N 121°03′35.25″E
- Campus: Urban Main: Hilltop Campus Kumintang Ibaba, Hilltop (Batangas City) Satellite: Millennium Campus 1.4 hectares (14,000 m^{2}), Kumintang Ibaba, Hilltop (Batangas City); Grade School Campus M.H. Del Pilar St. (Batangas City); Lipa Campus 3.5 hectares (35,000 m^{2}) Gov. Feliciano Leviste Road (Lipa)
- Philosophy: Faith in God, Love of Wisdom, and Service to Fellowmen
- Colors: Maroon and Gold
- Nicknames: UBians (for students); Brahmans (for athletes)
- Sporting affiliations: NCAA – South, PRISAA, and UCAL
- Mascot: Brahman
- Website: www.ub.edu.ph
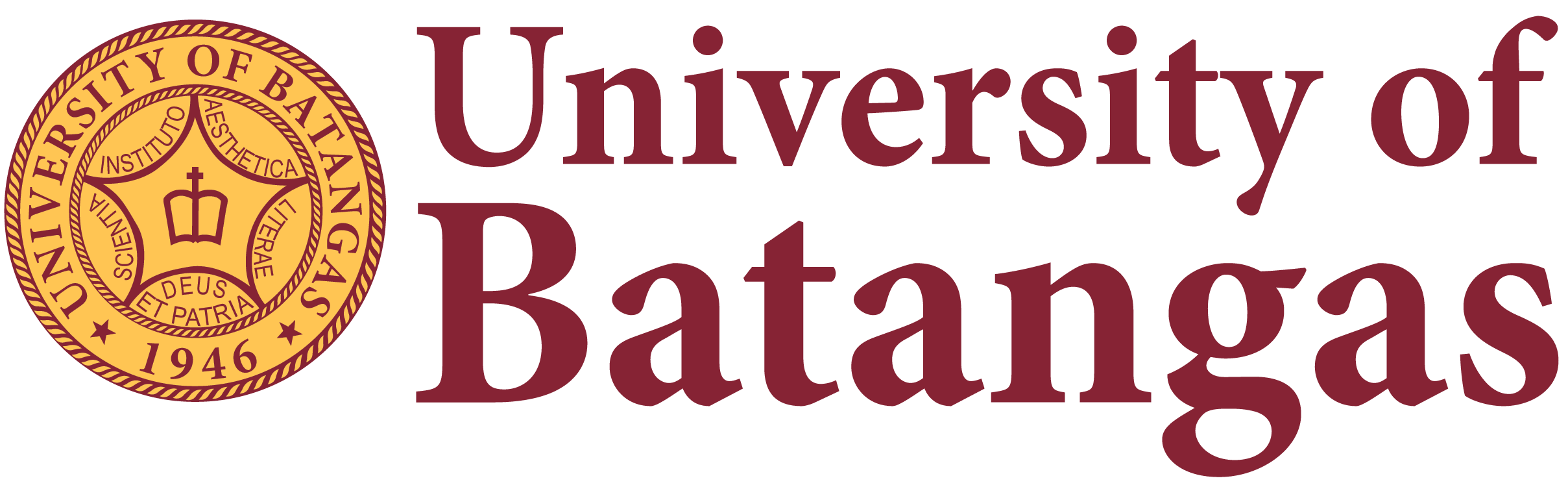

- Location in Luzon Location in the Philippines

The University of Batangas (UB; Filipino: Pamantasan ng Batangas), is a private university, basic and higher education institution located in Batangas City, Philippines. Founded in 1946 as Western Philippine College, it is the oldest university and second-oldest educational institution in Batangas.

Established in 1946, the university currently offers pre-elementary, elementary, high school, undergraduate and graduate studies and law. It has five campuses throughout the province and is ISO certified by AJA. It has been awarded by PACUCOA as having the 3rd most accredited programs in the country. The University of Batangas is recognized by CHED as a Center of Excellence in Electronics Engineering and as a Center of Development in Electrical Engineering, Mechanical Engineering and Teachers Education. It has also been recognized by PRC as a consistent top performer in engineering education nationwide. UB remains as a partner of DepEd in the training for K12 Teachers in the province of Batangas.

The University of Batangas College of Law is regarded as a top-performing legal education institution in Calabarzon region in terms of the quantity of lawyers it produces. It is also regarded as a premier legal education institution in the entire region.

== History ==
=== Early years ===
The University of Batangas was originally established as the Western Philippine Colleges in 1946 by Vicente R. Catapang, Jesus Lorenzo Arguelles, Juan Y. Javier, Roman L. Perez, Francisco G. Perez, and Pablo C. Umali. The first school was located in a small rental home opposite to Batangas Trade School (now Batangas State University).

Education and Liberal Arts were the initial courses offered, both with Mr. Juan Javier serving as the first dean. Deans of Commerce are Pablo C. Umali and Francisco G. Perez, respectively. Additionally, the high school and elementary department were launched, with Mrs. Flordeliza M. Arguelles and Ms. Gliceria Martinez serving as the respective principals. Due to the sudden increase from 48 to 78 students after a year, the classes were transferred to the Javier house, which was located on the corner of D. Silang and P. Burgos streets.

After being chosen by the board of trustees to lead the university, Vicente Catapang served as its first president.

=== Present years ===
Presidents of
University of Batangas
Vicente Catapang, 1947-1952
Juan Javier, 1952–1964
Manuel Panganiban, 1964–1967
Abelardo Perez, 1967–1971 (First Term)
Flordeliza Arguelles, 1971–1974
Abelardo Perez, 1974–2007 (Second Term)
Hernando Perez, 2007–2023
Lily Marlene Hernandez, 2023–present
Source: History - University of Batangas

The Executive Committee, was established by the Board of Trustees to overhaul the management and administration of Western Philippine College. The institution had maintained its ideals of offering a top-notch education to the youth of Batangas and the surrounding areas thanks to the new leadership. Abelardo B. Perez was chosen by the Executive Committee members as President and Chairman after three years. Abelardo Perez was the institution's president when the Board of Trustees' officers made the decision to have it converted to a stock corporation and registered with the Securities and Exchange Commission on December 23, 1967.

The presidency was held by Abelardo Perez until his demise in 2007. His brother, Hernando Perez succeeded him as the university president.

== Leadership ==
=== Board of Regents ===
The University of Batangas Board of Regents is the highest governing body of the university.

==== Current composition ====
Former composition (2023–present)
Position held	Name	Source		
Position held	Name	Source	Chairman	Jesus Victor Mayo
Vice Chairman	Jose Antonio Hernandez			
President	Lily Marlene Hernandez			
President Emeritus	Hernando Perez			
Secretary	Jose Carmelino Quizon			
Treasurer	Anna Marie Perez-Castro			
Member	Abegayle Machelle Chua			
Member	Jeanina Faye Delos Reyes			
Member	Antonio Aquino, Jr.			
Member	Victor Arguelles			
Member	Rachel Hernandez			
Member	Juan Carlos Quizon			

==== Former composition ====
Former composition (2023)
Position held	Name	Source		
Position held	Name	Source	President	Hernando Perez
Chairman	Jesus Victor Mayo			
Vice Chairman	Jose Antonio Hernandez			
Executive Vice President; Treasurer	Lily Marlene Hernandez			
Secretary	Jose Carmelino Quizon			
Member	Anna Marie Perez-Castro			
Member	Antonio Aquino, Jr.			
Member	Ramon Arceo, Jr.			
Member	Alex Ramos			
Member	Michael Francis Perez			
Member	Rachel Hernandez			
Member	Jeanina Faye Delos Reyes			
Member	Vicente Bernardo Mayo			

=== Executive Committee ===
The Executive Committee, led by Manuel Panganiban, was established by the Board of Trustees to restructure the management and administration of WPC. The institution had maintained its ideals of offering a top-notch education to the youth of Batangas and the surrounding areas. Abelardo B. Perez was chosen by the Executive Committee members as President and Chairman after three years. The officers of the Board of Trustees made the decision to convert the organization to a stock corporation during the tenure of Perez, and on December 23, 1967, the Securities and Exchange Commission officially registered it as such.

==== List of Chairperson of the Executive Committee ====
Position	Name	Tenure
Position established in 1967
Chairman (concurrently serving as President)	Manuel Panganiban	1964–1967
Chairman (concurrently serving as President)	Abelardo Perez	1967–1971
Position abolished in 1971

== Campus ==

As of 2022, the University of Batangas has one main and three satellite campuses in Batangas.

The university has four campuses in the Batangas Province. The Batangas campus, which houses the Colleges, Highschool Department and Administrative offices of the university is located in Hilltop, Batangas City; while the pre-elementary and elementary departments are in the Downtown campus along M.H. del Pilar Street, beside the City Library near the Batangas Basilica. The university's Pallocan East campus is the site of the Waldorf School International, and the newest addition is the Lipa City Campus, which is located in Marawoy, Lipa City, Batangas.

=== UB Batangas ===	=== UB Grade School ===	=== UB Lipa ===	=== UB Millenium ===

== Academics ==
=== University of Batangas K to 12 Curriculum ===
CAMPUS
HILLTOP	MILLENNIUM	GRADE SCHOOL	LIPA
Junior High School (Grades 7 - 10)	Senior High School (Grades 11 - 12)	Kinder to Grade 6	K to 12 Basic Education Curriculum; Junior High School (Grades 7 - 10); Senior High School (Grades 11 - 12)

=== University of Batangas Colleges and Courses ===
HILLTOP CAMPUS	LIPA CAMPUS
College of Allied Medical Sciences; Bachelor of Science in Occupational Therapy; Bachelor of Science in Physical Therapy; Bachelor of Science in Respiratory Therapy; Bachelor of Science in Speech-Language Pathology; College of Arts and Sciences; Bachelor of Arts in Communication; Bachelor of Arts in Legal Management; Bachelor of Arts in Multi Media Arts; Bachelor of Science in Psychology; Bachelor of Arts in Psychology; Bachelor of Arts in Political Science; College of Business and Accountancy; Bachelor of Science in Accountancy; Bachelor of Science in Business Administration; Major in Accounting Technology; Major in Business Management; Major in Financial Management; Major in Human Resources Development; Major in Marketing Management; Bachelor of Science in Office Administration; College of Criminal Justice Education; Bachelor of Science in Criminology; College of Education; Bachelor of Elementary Education; Major in Content Courses; Major in Early Childhood Education; Major in Special Education; Bachelor of Secondary Education; Major in English; Major in Filipino; Major in General Science; Major in Mathematics; Major in Physical Education, Arts, Health and Music; Major in Social Studies; Bachelor of Library and Information Science; Certificate in Teaching Program; College of Engineering; Bachelor of Science in Civil Engineering; Bachelor of Science in Computer Engineering; Bachelor of Science in Electrical Engineering; Bachelor of Science in Electronics Engineering; Bachelor of Science in Industrial Engineering; Bachelor of Science in Mechanical Engineering; College of Information and Communications Technology; Bachelor of Science in Computer Science; Bachelor of Science in Information Technology; College of Law; Doctor of Jurisprudence; College of Nursing and Midwifery; Bachelor of Science in Nursing; Certificate in Midwifery; College of Tourism and Hospitality Management; ETEEAP; Graduate Studies; Technical Education Department	Juris Doctor; Bachelor of Arts in Legal Management; Bachelor of Science in Psychology; Bachelor of Elementary Education; Bachelor of Secondary Education; Bachelor of Science in Accountancy; Bachelor of Science in Business Administration; Major in Accounting Management; Major in Business Management; Bachelor of Science in Computer Science; Bachelor of Science in Information Technology; Bachelor of Science in Criminology; Bachelor of Science in International; Hospitality Management (Ladderized Curriculum); Bachelor of Science in Tourism Management; Bachelor of Science in Computer Engineering; Bachelor of Science in Industrial Engineering; Academic Secondary Course
