= Philippine Christian University =

Protestant university in Manila, Philippines

- Pamantasang Kristiyano ng Pilipinas (Filipino)
- Former names: Manila Union University; Philippine Christian College
- Motto: Faith, Character and Service
- Type: Private basic and higher education institution
- Established: October 6, 1946; 80 years ago
- Religious affiliation: The United Methodist Church and the United Church of Christ in the Philippines but maintains its independence in governance
- Academic affiliations: Inter-Institutional Consortium, ISO, ACSCU-AAI,
- Chairman: Bishop Emergencio Padillo
- President: Junifen F. Gauuan
- Location: 1648 Taft Ave. corner Pedro Gil St., Malate, Manila, Metro Manila, Philippines; 14.576069°N 120.988901°E
- Hymn: PCU Hymn
- Colors: Blue and Silver
- Nickname: PCU Dolphins
- Sporting affiliations: NAASCU, UCAL, NCAA South
- Mascot: Dolphin
- Website: www.pcu.edu.ph
- Location in Manila Location in Metro Manila Location in Luzon Location in the Philippines

The Philippine Christian University (PCU) is a private, Protestant, and coeducational basic and higher education institution located in Ermita, Manila, Philippines. It was founded on October 6, 1946 through the initiatives of the laymen of the Evangelical Association of the Philippines. Originally named Manila Union University, it was renamed Philippine Christian College (PCC). In 1976, the PCC acquired university status.

PCU is one of the two major Mainline Protestant universities at the heart of Metro Manila, the other being Trinity University of Asia (under the Episcopal Church in the Philippines). It is also a member institution of Association of Christian Schools, Colleges and Universities (ACSCU).

The university maintains a satellite campus in Iloilo City through partnership with St. Roberts International Academy.

== Athletics ==
PCU Manila joined the National Collegiate Athletic Association from 1996 to 2007, and 2008 to 2009. The varsity teams are called the PCU Dolphins.

On the other hand, PCU Dasmariñas athletic teams are also called PCU Dolphins and are members of NCAA South since 1999.

== Notable alumni ==
=== Entertainment ===
- Kyla
- Karla Estrada
- Ronnie Liang
- Lani Misalucha
- Jomari Yllana
- Geneva Cruz

=== Society ===
- Jejomar Binay
- Dionardo Carlos
- Ricardo de Leon
- Eduardo del Rosario
- Aniano A. Desierto
- Hermogenes Esperon Jr.
- Gilbert Gapay
- Neptali Gonzales II
- Benjamin Madrigal Jr.
- Rafael Nantes
- Manny Pacquiao
- Jovito Palparan
- AKM Shamsul Islam

=== Sports ===
- Beau Belga
- Jayson Castro
- Jackson Corpuz
- Onchie dela Cruz
- Gabby Espinas
- Jake Pascual

== Gallery ==
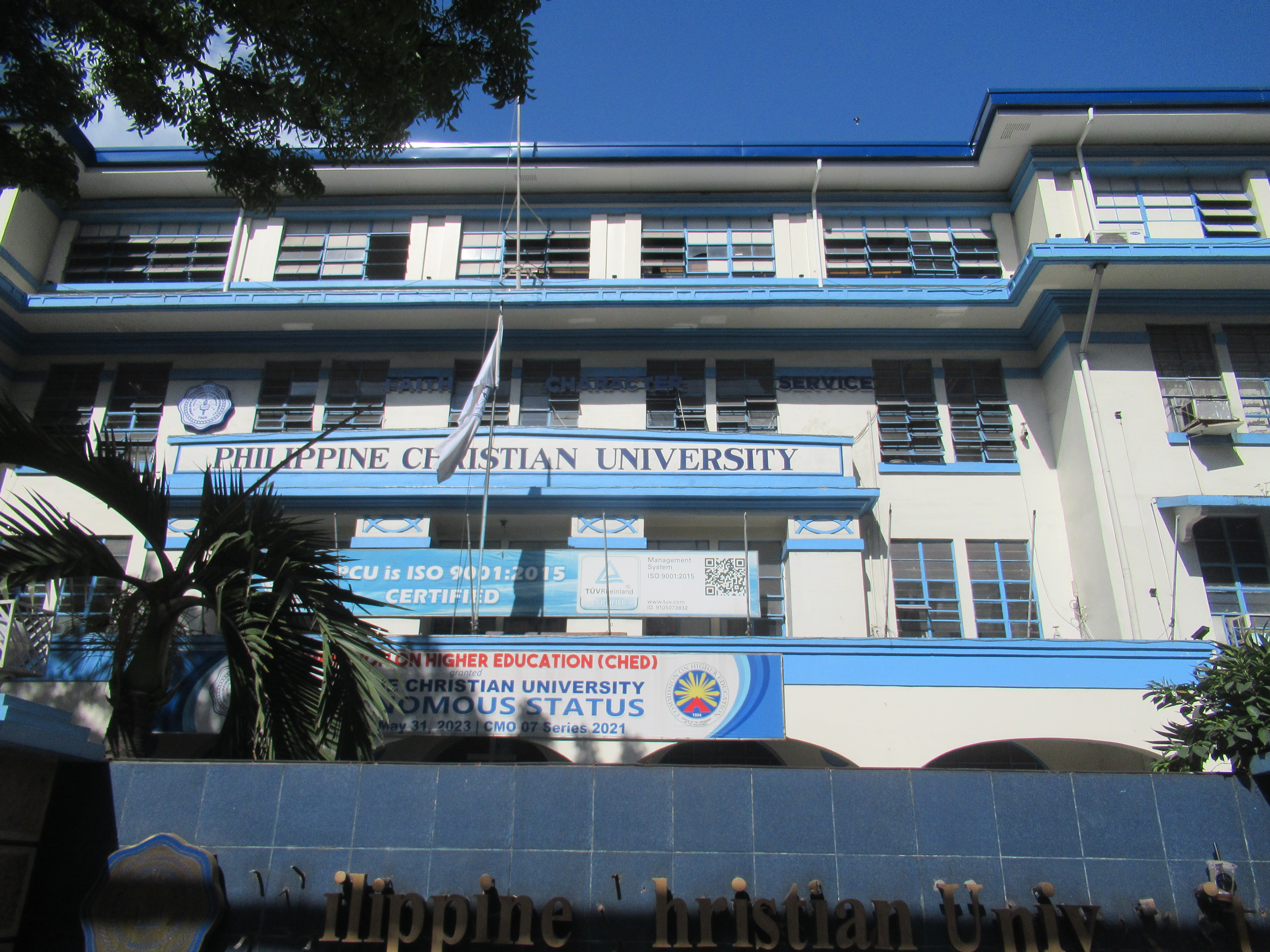
Philippine Christian University façade in March 2023
