= Ronaldo Aquino =

Filipino accountant and politician (1961–2021)

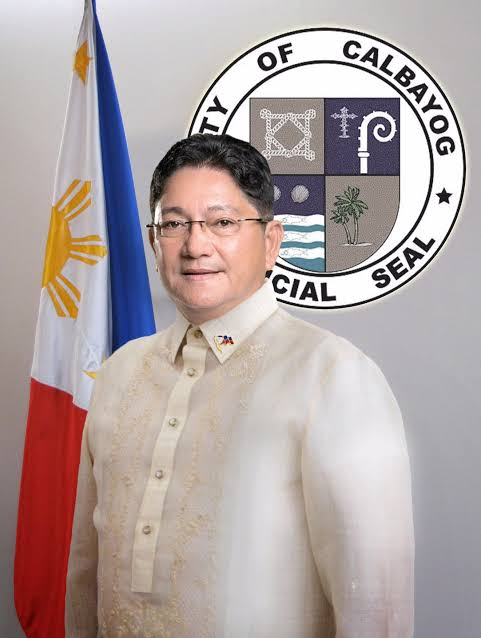
- Ronaldo Aquino in 2018

Mayor of Calbayog
- In office May 2, 2011 – March 8, 2021
- Preceded by: Reynaldo Uy
- Succeeded by: Diego Rivera

Vice Mayor of Calbayog
- In office June 30, 2004 – May 2, 2011
- In office June 30, 1995 – June 30, 2001

Personal details
- Born: Ronaldo Porlares Aquino; December 5, 1961 Calbayog, Samar, Philippines
- Died: March 8, 2021 (aged 59) Calbayog, Samar, Philippines
- Party: Liberal
- Education: University of the East
- Profession: Accountant
- Nickname: “Onald”

Ronaldo Porlares Aquino (December 5, 1961 – March 8, 2021) was a Filipino accountant and politician who served as mayor of the city of Calbayog, Samar. He and his three companions were assassinated in March 8, 2021.

== Early life and career ==
Aquino was born in Calbayog, Samar. He earned his Bachelor of Science in Accountancy at University of the East and became a certified public accountant before entering politics in 1992.

He served as vice mayor of the city from 1995 to 2001 and 2004 until 2011. Upon the assassination of mayor Reynaldo Uy, he took the position and was sworn in as the mayor of the city from 2011 until his murder on March 8, 2021.

== Death ==
In 2011, his predecessor, mayor Reynaldo Uy was killed by a sniper during a formal program at Hinabangan town when during that time, Aquino was the vice-mayor. On March 8, 2021, Aquino, including 5 others, was also killed suffering 21 gunshot wounds in his entire body during a shoot-out with police in a "mistaken encounter" as authorities initially claimed.

=== Investigation on Calbayog incident and trial status ===
His killing prompted a Senate investigation. A police officer, who turned as a whistleblower, revealed instances of collusion between the police and Aquino's political rivals, including linking Aquino in the drug trade whose claims were later dismissed. The National Bureau of Investigation in Eastern Visayas said in a hearing on June 9, 2021 that the incident had long been allegedly planned by members of Samar police, based on the affidavits of 53 witnesses and CCTV footage. A statement by the lone survivor, Aquino's assistant, also refuted the claim by the police that it was a shootout.

NBI released their report later that month, revealing that the van that Aquino rode had a total of almost 600 bullet holes. The vehicles used by police officers and by the operatives also got a total of 185 entry and exit holes and five entry holes, respectively. The one caught in the crossfire, which also contained the civilian casualty, sustained eleven gunshots.

A joint resolution issued by the Department of Justice prosecutors on December 15, 2021 was released on January 19, 2022, saying Aquino and his aides were ambushed.

The following day, DOJ indicted nine accused police officers and several John Does on four counts of murder and one count of frustrated murder, the latter a bailable offense. As recommended by the NBI, charges were later filed before the Calbayog Regional Trial Court. Meanwhile, counter-charges against Ronaldo's son, Mark, and a police corporal, and the complaint against Mark for grave threats, all filed by the Philippine National Police; as well as the supplemental complaint of Mark against two individuals, were dismissed.

On February 15, 2022, the nine surrendered to the Criminal Investigation and Detection Group in Camp Crame, a day after the Calbayog RTC Branch 32 issued their arrest warrants. They were then detained in the PNP custodial facility; CIDG were later asked to transfer the accused to a jail facility in Samar.

All were dismissed from the service; four of them in late 2021.

In 2023, a day prior to the anniversary of the incident, RTC Branch 31 granted bail to suspects before the judge inhibited herself from the case. RTC Branch 33 ordered their temporary release on March 17. The trial is ongoing.
