= University of Perpetual Help System =

Network of two universities in the Philippines

- Formation: 1968; 58 years ago (first campus)
- Type: University systems
- Locations: Las Piñas, Metro Manila (DALTA main campus); Biñan, Laguna (JONELTA main campus)
- Members: 9 campuses (DALTA: 3, JONELTA 6)

The University of Perpetual Help System is a network of two universities consisting of nine campuses in the Philippines.

== History ==
Established in 1968 by Dr. Jose de Guzman Tamayo and his wife Dra. Josefina Laperal Tamayo as Perpetual Help Hospital and College of Nursing, this institution has been training nurses, doctors, maritime, accountants, hrm, allied health, lawyers, engineers, and many other professionals for service in the Philippines and abroad. Now known as UPHS Jonelta (Jose and Nena Laperal Tamayo), the University of Perpetual Help System Jonelta has campuses in Manila, Binan, GMA Cavite, Isabela, and Malasiqui, Pangasinan.

Over the years, under the leadership of Dr./Br.Gen. Antonio L. Tamayo, this institution has developed into a university offering a wide variety of programs mentioned above, but its allied health programs including nursing is the university's core.

The University of Perpetual Help System DALTA (UPHSD) was founded on February 5, 1975 by Dr. Daisy Moran Tamayo and Br. Gen. Antonio L. Tamayo, is a highly recognized university in the Philippines. It has 3 major campuses in Las Piñas, Molino, and Calamba. Commission on Higher Education (CHED), Philippines granted deregulated status (equivalent to Autonomous Status) to University of Perpetual Help System DALTA, Manila, Philippines.

Over the past four decades, UPHS has opened nine campuses nationwide including the University of Perpetual Help System DALTA (DALTA System with its main branch in Las Piñas) and the University of Perpetual Help System Laguna (JONELTA System with its main branch in Binan, Laguna).

== Governance ==
The UPHS is governed by a single governing board of directors composed of 15 directors, of which 5 directors represent the University of Perpetual Help System DALTA, 5 for the University of Perpetual Help System JONELTA, and 5 for the UPH-Dr. Jose G. Tamayo Medical University Foundation, with a single Chairman of the Board and CEO in the person of Dr./BGen Antonio Laperal Tamayo.

The Board of Directors governs the UPHS through a central office headed by the Chief Executive Officer (CEO). The CEO created the executive board which directly formulates, implements, and supervises all policies, guidelines, programs and projects relative to the philosophy, vision, mission, accreditation, standardization of curricular content and instruction, quality assurance, professional development, faculty research, and community service, among others, of the UPH Las Piñas and UPH Biñan.

Both UPH Las Piñas and UPH Biñan have their respective presidents who act as chief operating officers (COOs) of their respective campuses. They both directly report and are responsible to the CEO.

== Campuses ==
The University of Perpetual Help System composed of two constituent university systems namely:

=== DALTA System ===
- University of Perpetual Help System DALTA – Las Piñas (Main Campus)
- University of Perpetual Help System DALTA – Molino Campus
- University of Perpetual Help System DALTA – Calamba Campus

=== JONELTA System ===
- University of Perpetual Help System JONELTA – Biñan (Main Campus)
- University of Perpetual Help System JONELTA – Manila Campus
- University of Perpetual Help System JONELTA – GMA Campus
- University of Perpetual Help System JONELTA – Pangasinan Campus
- University of Perpetual Help System JONELTA – Cagayan Valley Campus
- University of Perpetual Help System - Pueblo de Panay Campus
