= First Asia Institute of Technology and Humanities =

Private college in Batangas, Philippines

First Asia Institute of Technology and Humanities (FAITH)
- Type: Private
- Established: 2001
- Affiliations: First Asia Venture Capital Inc.
- President: Dr. Saturnino G. Belen Jr.
- Location: President Laurel Highway, Tanauan City, Batangas, Philippines; 14°04′39″N 121°08′58″E
- Campus: 5 hectares
- Varsity: The Bravehearts
- Colors: Blue and Green
- Website: www.firstasia.edu.ph
- Location in Luzon Location in the Philippines

First Asia Institute of Technology and Humanities is a private college in Tanauan, Batangas, Philippines. The school offers pre-elementary, elementary, high school and college-level education, offering courses in technology, humanities, and management. It offers two-year certificate programs under First Asia Community College.

The five-hectare campus has classrooms used for all levels of education. It houses facilities for sports, extra-curricular activities and school functions.

== Degrees ==
=== School of Technology ===
- Bachelor of Science in Information Technology
- Bachelor of Science in Entertainment and Multimedia Computing
- Bachelor of Science in Computer Science
- Bachelor of Science in Industrial Engineering
- Bachelor of Science in Computer Engineering
- Bachelor of Science in Electronics Engineering (EcE)
- Bachelor of Science in Electrical Engineering

=== School of Management ===
- Bachelor of Science in Accountancy
- Bachelor of Science in Accounting Technology
- Bachelor of Science in Management Accounting
- Bachelor of Science in Entrepreneurial Management
- Bachelor of Science in Hotel and Restaurant Management
- Bachelor of Science in Tourism

=== School of Humanities ===
- Bachelor of Arts in Communication
- Bachelor of Arts in Multimedia Arts
- Bachelor of Science in Psychology
- Bachelor of Science in Mathematics
- Bachelor of Science in Nursing
- Bachelor of Science in Secondary Education (Math, English, and Physical Education)
- Bachelor of Elementary Education
- Bachelor of Science in Criminology
- Bachelor of Science in Industrial Security Management
- Bachelor of Science in Medical Technology
- Bachelor of Forensic Science
- Bachelor of Science in Exercise and Sports Science

== Notable alumni ==
- Vinci Malizon, singer, dancer, leader, and member of Filipino global pop group Hori7on
