= Pag-asa (eagle) =

Philippine eagle

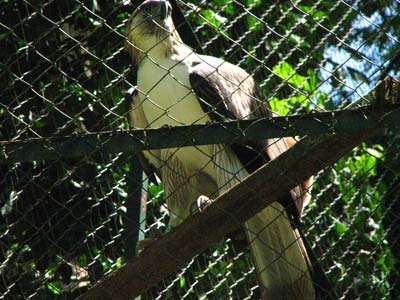
- Pag-asa in 2007
- Species: Pithecophaga jefferyi
- Sex: Male
- Hatched: January 15, 1992; Philippine Eagle Center, Davao City
- Died: January 6, 2021 (aged 28); Davao City, Philippines
- Cause of death: Trichomoniasis and aspergillosis infections
- Nationality: Philippines
- Known for: First Philippine eagle to be bred and hatched in captivity
- Owner: Philippine Eagle Foundation
- Offspring: 1 (Mabuhay)

Pag-asa (Filipino: [paɡˈʔa.sa]; January 15, 1992 – January 6, 2021) was a Philippine eagle and the first of his species to be bred and hatched in captivity.

== Conception ==
Pag-asa was bred by a team of the Philippine Eagle Conservation Program Foundation (PECPF; now Philippine Eagle Foundation), led by executive director Dennis Salvador and camp manager Domingo Tadena. This was a result of 14 years of research.

Pag-asa was bred through artificial insemination and hatched through a combined artificial and natural incubation technique taught by the World Center For Birds of Prey. He was the first offspring, the second being Pagkakaisa (later renamed "Tiwala"), of Philippine eagles Diola (died 1994, imprinted on caretaker Goneforte Culiao) and Junior (imprinted on caretaker Bernardino Salarza). Then 22-year-old Diola laid the egg, and Junior, found in Agusan, donated sperm. She sat the egg for twelve days before it was transferred to an incubator. According to the PECPF, the breeding technique improved the hatchability of the egg by as much as 30 percent.

== Hatching ==
Pag-asa hatched at 10:40 pm PST on January 15, 1992, at the Philippine Eagle Center in Barangay Malagos at the Calinan district in Davao City. Hatched four days earlier than expected, he weighed 134.6 grams (4.75 oz). He had a hard time getting out of his egg, so a PECPF staff member cracked it.

Pag-asa was named after the Tagalog term for "hope" by the PECPF team. Awareness of conservation efforts on the endangered Philippine eagles increased after the hatching of Pag-asa.

Then-Davao City mayor Rodrigo Duterte declared Pag-asa's hatch day as Philippine Eagle Day, or Pag-asa Day. Since then, the Philippine Eagle Center has established breeding and rearing protocols.

== Adult life ==
Pag-asa was unsuitable for release and remained in captivity, due to dependence on humans, particularly his keeper, Eddie Juntilla, on whom he had imprinted.

Pag-asa sired his first chick on February 9, 2013, through artificial insemination. It hatched at 1:55 am PST from an egg laid by 29-year-old Kalinawan. It weighed 158 grams at its hatching, and was the first offspring of an eagle bred in captivity. The chick was named Mabuhay and determined to be female.

Pag-asa died on January 6, 2021, aged 28. He had infections associated with trichomoniasis and aspergillosis, which proved resistant to treatment.

== See also ==
- List of individual birds
