= Colegio de San Lorenzo =

Roman Catholic college in Quezon City, Philippines

Colegio De San Lorenzo
- Dalubhasaan ng San Lorenzo (Filipino)
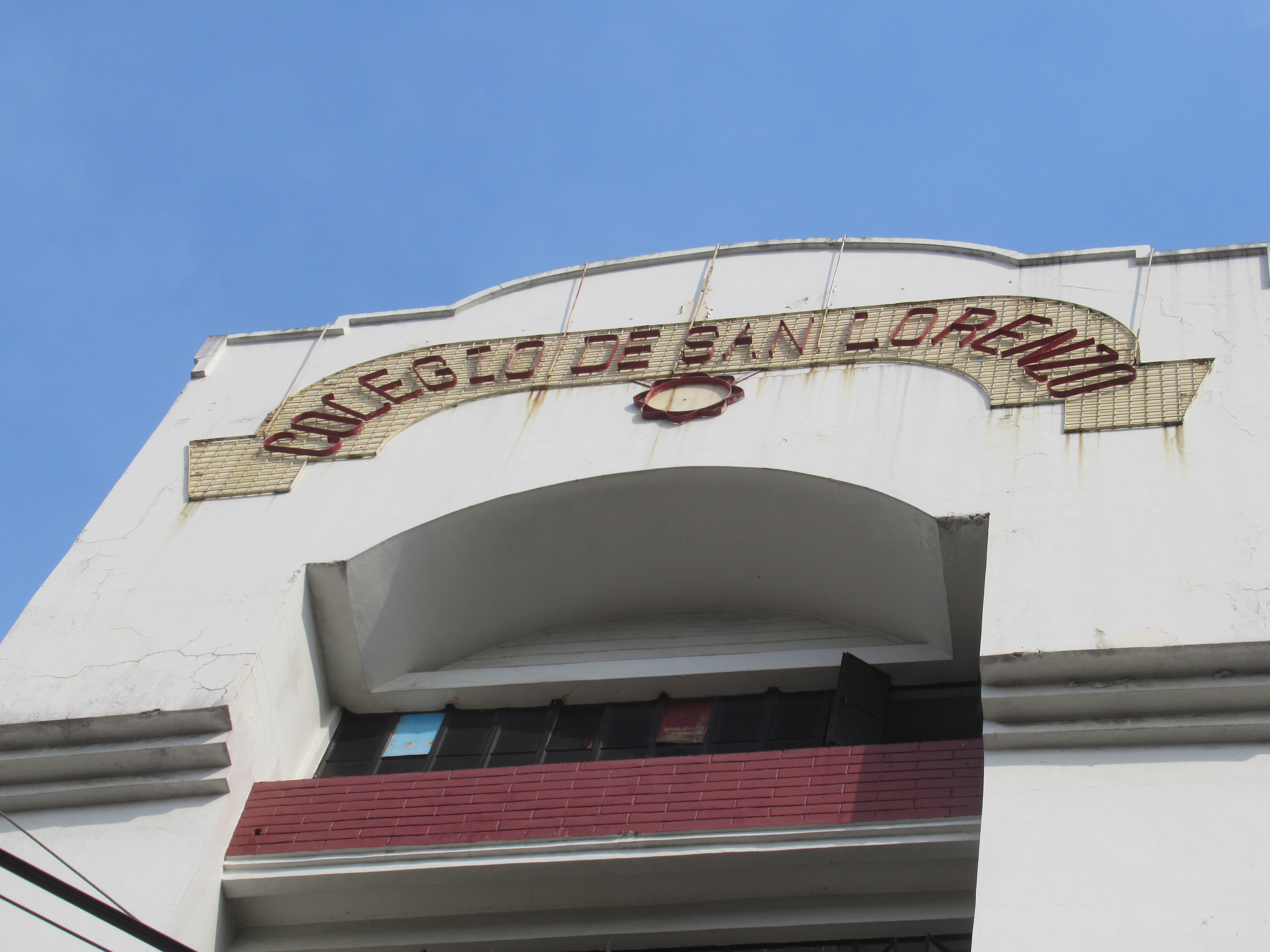
- Motto: In Ministerio Domini (Latin)
- Motto in English: In the Service of the Lord
- Type: Private, Non-Sectarian
- Active: 1987–2022
- Founders: Cirilo Lloyd V. Balgan; Annette F. Balgan
- Academic affiliations: CEAP
- President: Rina Monique Balgan-Garcia
- Dean: Prof. Leonor Hernando (Dean College of Arts & Sciences); Engr. Nelson Rodelas (Dean Computer Science Dept.); Prof. Ellen Dizon (Dean School of Business & Management); Prof. Leslie Namoro (Dean School of Hospitality Management)
- Director: Dr. Pedro R. Lora Jr.
- Location: Congressional Avenue corner Jupiter St., Brgy Bahay Toro, Project 8, Quezon City, Metro Manila, Philippines; 14°40′13.90″N 121°2′13.93″E
- Campus: Urban Main: Quezon City, Metro Manila Satellite: Macabebe, Pampanga
- Language: English, Filipino, Mandarin
- Academic Council Head: Engr. Danilo Reyes
- Colors: Gold Red Blue
- Sporting affiliations: UCSAA UCLAA
- Mascot: The Griffin
- Website: sanlo.edu.ph
- Location in Metro Manila Location in Luzon Location in the Philippines

Colegio de San Lorenzo (CDSL) was a private Catholic college located in Barangay Bahay Toro, Quezon City and in Macabebe, Pampanga. It opened in 1988 in Quezon City and the branch in the founder's hometown of Macabebe opened in 1996.

On August 15, 2022, Colegio de San Lorenzo announced it would be closing down and would cease operations by September 2022, citing financial instability and lack of financial viability due to the COVID-19 pandemic. The sudden announcement of its shutdown, on what would have been the school's first day of classes, brought negative responses from parents, students, and employees alike.

== Gritty Griffins ==
SanLo's varsity team, the Griffins, is a member of the Universities, Colleges, and Schools Athletic Association (UCSAA) and the Universities and Colleges of Luzon Athletic Association (UCLAA). The senior basketball team won the UCSAA championship in four consecutive years, 2012 to 2015. They also won the Universities and Colleges Basketball League (UCBL) title in 2017. Jonjon Gabriel, a Griffin basketball player, went on to be selected in the first round of the 2017 PBA Draft. In 2018, their basketball team was disbanded.

== Publications ==
- Escribano – The Ruizian Record (official school paper)
- Escribano Online
- Interaction: A Multidisciplinary Research Journal

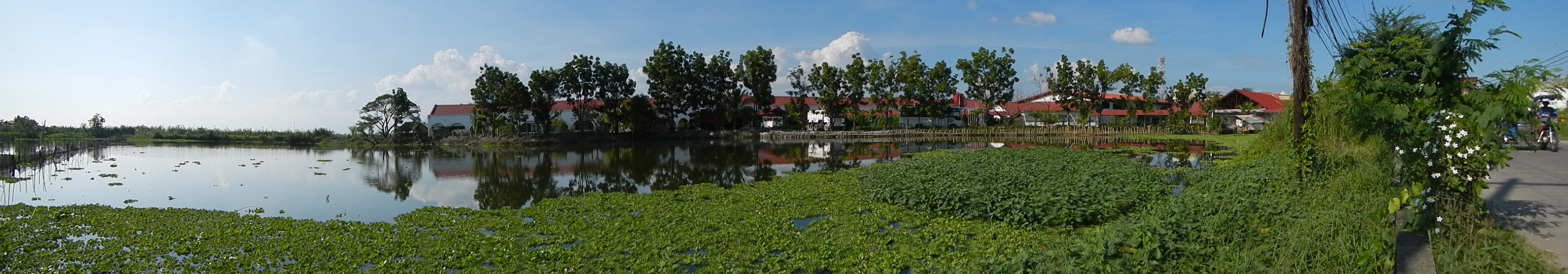
CDSL in Macabebe
