= Fidelis Atienza =

Filipino Roman Catholic nun, baker, and confectioner (1918–2021)

Sr. M. Fidelis Atienza RGS

Personal life
- Born: Graciana Teofila Quinio Atienza; December 18, 1918
- Died: March 20, 2021 (aged 102) Quezon City, Philippines
- Home town: Batangas City
- Known for: Good Shepherd (Mountain Maid) ube jam

Religious life
- Religion: Roman Catholic
- Institute: Religious of the Good Shepherd

Fidelis Atienza (December 18, 1918 – March 20, 2021) was a Filipino Roman Catholic nun, baker, and confectioner who was a member of the Religious of the Good Shepherd (RGS). She is credited with the Good Shepherd ube jam, a food souvenir or pasalubong that became widely associated with the city of Baguio.

== Biography ==
Born on December 18, 1918, Atienza entered the Novitiate of the Good Shepherd in Los Angeles, California in the United States. Her first profession was in 1954 with her final profession made in 1957. A native of Batangas City, she established the Marian Bakery in the 1960s and created crispies, which were the forerunner of the angel cookie.

According to the Religious of the Good Shepherd, Atienza started making the ube jam when she was assigned in Baguio. She introduced the ube jam to the congregation in 1976, which enabled the religious group to provide education to thousands of youths. The ube jam's formulation was reportedly perfected by Sr. Assumption Ocampo. Atienza's ministry also included community apostolates in other places in the Philippines such as Cebu, Quezon City, and Tagaytay and abroad including France, Hong Kong and Rome. She spent most of her ministry at the Maryridge Retreat House in Tagaytay.

Prior to her death on March 20, 2021, she was reassigned at the Good Shepherd Community in Quezon City in 2020.
