= Vic Sison =

Filipino footballer (1936–2021)

Personal information
- Date of birth: December 1936
- Date of death: October 14, 2021 (aged 84)
- Position: Goalkeeper

Senior career*
Years	Team	Apps	(Gls)
1950s	Lions		

International career
1950s	Philippines		
- * Club domestic league appearances and goals

Victor Sison (December 1936 – October 14, 2021) was a Filipino footballer who played as a goalkeeper for the Philippines national team.

== Career ==
Victor Sison was a goalkeeper of the Philippines national team in the 1950s and was a specialist in saving penalty kicks. He was named Mr. Football by the Philippine Sportswriters Association in 1956.

Sison at age 17 was part of the 1954 Asian Games as a reserve goalkeeper. He took part in the 1956 AFC Asian Cup qualifiers. In the second leg, where the Philippines lost 3–0 to South Korea, Sison is noted to have prevented 15 other goals despite the poor pitch conditions. Sison was again part of the squad for the 1958 Asian Games. He was instrumental in the Philippines' 1–0 win over Japan, saving 22 goal attempts. The win was considered as an upset at the time. The national team went on to advance to the knock-out stage losing to Indonesia in the quarterfinals. Prior to their 1958 Asian Games stint, Sison's side had a training tour in Spain.

He also played college football, playing for Ateneo de Manila's team at the National Collegiate Athletic Association (NCAA). Ateneo coach Teodoro Erechun was Sison's mentor. In club football, Sison played for the Lions F.C. of the Manila Football League. The Lions won the league title from 1955 to 1962. Sison retired from football at age 22 to commit to his job since continuing his football career proved to be not financially sustainable. He was already married at that time and had to provide for his family and was based in Baguio working for FilOil.

== Later life and death ==
Sison was responsible for the creation of the Ateneo Sports Hall of Fame (ASHOF), to honor student-athletes of his alma mater. He served as the hall of fame's director. He himself is also an ASHOF inductee.

Sison died on October 14, 2021, from COVID-19 amidst a pandemic of the disease. He was 84 years old.
