= St. Joseph College of Bulacan =

Private college in Bulacan, Philippines

Saint Joseph College of Bulacan
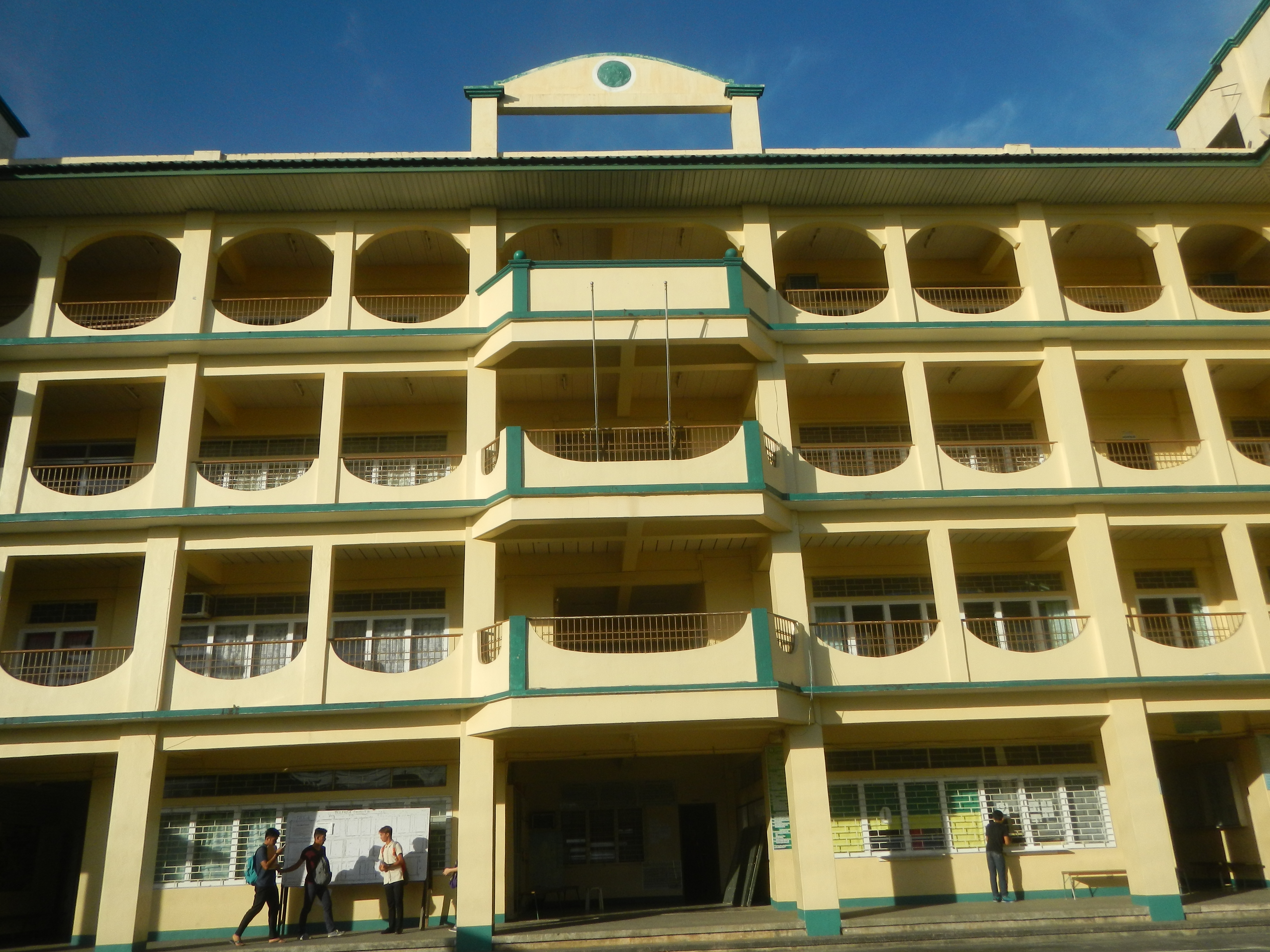
- Facade
- Motto: Where Quality Education is foremost and is geared towards Total Human Development
- Active: 1996–May 25, 2021 (basic education); June 2022 (tertiary education)
- Location: Sta. Maria, Bulacan (Flagship campus), Philippines; 14°49′36″N 120°58′50″E
- Location in Bulacan Location in Luzon Location in the Philippines

Saint Joseph College of Bulacan is a private higher education institution located in San Jose Patag, Santa Maria, Bulacan, Philippines.

== Programs ==
New Programs:

- Bachelor in Physical Education;
- Bachelor of Science in Accountancy;
- Bachelor of Science in Information System;
- Bachelor of Science in Tourism Management;
- Diploma in Midwifery

Programs Offered:

- Master of Arts in education (Educational Management), in consortium with Bulucan State University,
- Bachelor of Science in Business Administration, Major in : Financial, Human Resource, and Operations Management,

Bachelor of Science in Hotel And Restaurant Management,

- Bachelor of Arts in psychology,
- Bachelor of Science in Computer Science,
- Bachelor of Elementary Education, Major in Early Childhood Education,
- Bachelor of Secondary Education, Major in: English, Filipino, Mathematics

Short-term / Non-degree Programs

- Teachers Certificate Program,
- Associate in Computer Technology,
- Caregiver NCII,
- Health Care Services NCII,
- Diploma in Hotel and Restaurant Services,
- Certificate in Housekeeping NCII,
- Primary / Secondary school
