= Leticia Gempisao =

Filipino softball player (died 2021)

- Catcher
- Born: 1951 or 1952
- Died: September 30, 2021 (aged 69)
Medals
Women's softball
Representing Philippines
World Championship
Bronze medal – third place	1970 Osaka	Team
Asian Championship
Silver medal – second place	1969 Taipei	Team
Southeast Asian Games
Gold medal – first place	1979 Jakarta	Team
Gold medal – first place	1983 Manila	Team
Gold medal – first place	1987 Jakarta	Team

Leticia Gempisao (1951 or 1952 – September 30, 2021) was a Filipino softball player who played as a catcher. She was part of the Philippine national team which placed third in the 1970 Women's Softball World Championship in Osaka, Japan.

Hailing from the town of Sibonga, Cebu, Gempisao first played for the Philippine national team in the 1969 Asian Championships. She has also featured in the Southeast Asian Games, first taking part in 1979, and went on to help the Philippines win three consecutive softball titles.

Aside from the 1970 World Championship, Gempisao also took part in the 1974, 1982, and 1990 editions. She retired from competitive softball in 1990 but remained involved in the national team as a coach.

Gempisao suffered from a stroke in December 2019. She died on September 30, 2021. She was unmarried.
