= 2007–08 British Basketball League season =

2007–08 BBL season
- League: British Basketball League
- Sport: Basketball

Roll of Honour
- BBL champions: Newcastle Eagles
- Play Off's champions: Guildford Heat
- BBL Cup champions: Milton Keynes Lions
- BBL Trophy champions: Guildford Heat

British Basketball League seasons
- ← 2006–07 2008–09 →

The 2007–08 BBL season, the 21st since the establishment of the British Basketball League, commenced on 9 September 2007, when the Plymouth Raiders succumbed to the Guildford Heat in the inaugural Cup Winners' Cup competition. The regular season started two weeks later on 21 September with 12 teams including new additions Birmingham Panthers, Everton Tigers and London Capital the later of whom stepped up from EBL Division 1 during the summer. After just one season in the top-flight, London United were forced to drop out due to the loss of its financial backer just weeks before the start of the season.

Guildford's participation in the ULEB Cup saw a British team return to European competition for the first time since Brighton Bears' appearance in the same competition in the 2003–04 season. Out of their depth, the Heat finished their European adventure with a 0–10 record.

On the domestic scene Guildford continued their dominance, collecting the Cup Winners' Cup, BBL Trophy and the Play-off crown. Newcastle Eagles were Champions of the League's regular season campaign, whilst rookie teams Everton and London ended with respectable 7th and 9th-place finishes. The League also secured a live broadcasting contract with Setanta Sports midway through the campaign which saw one televised game a week screened on live on their network.

== Teams ==
Locations of the 2007–08 BBL teams

Team	City/Area	Arena	Capacity	Last season
Birmingham Panthers	Birmingham & Telford	UoW, Walsall Campus & TCAT Arena	1,000; 500	New
Cheshire Jets	Chester	Northgate Arena	1,000	9th
Everton Tigers	Liverpool	Echo Arena & Greenbank Sports Academy	7,513; 600	New
Guildford Heat	Guildford	Guildford Spectrum	1,100	1st
Leicester Riders	Leicester	John Sandford Centre	800	7th
London Capital	London	Capital City Academy	300	New
Milton Keynes Lions	Milton Keynes	Bletchley Centre	800	6th
Newcastle Eagles	Newcastle upon Tyne	Metro Radio Arena	6,500	3rd
Plymouth Raiders	Plymouth	Plymouth Pavilions	1,480	5th
Scottish Rocks	Glasgow	Braehead Arena	4,000	4th
Sheffield Sharks	Sheffield	English Institute of Sport	1,200	2nd
Worcester Wolves	Worcester	University of Worcester	600	10th

== Notable occurrences ==
- The league features three new teams, the Birmingham Panthers and Everton Tigers, both start-up franchises, and London Capital, who stepped up from the English Basketball League.
- Just two weeks before the start of the season, London United's directors announced on 5 September that they have withdrawn from all competitions for the upcoming season because of financial difficulties, leaving new team Capital as London's sole representatives.
- A new pre-season competition, the Cup Winners' Cup, a two-legged face-off between the current holders of the BBL Cup and the BBL Trophy, opened the new season, with Guildford Heat claiming a 176-168 aggregate win over Plymouth Raiders.
- On 2 October, just days before their inaugural home game, Birmingham Panthers finally secured a deal with the University of Wolverhampton, to use their Walsall Campus as a home venue. This came after deals with two other venues had previously fallen through, and the League rejected a proposal for relocation to Telford.
- Guildford made their debut in European competition (ULEB Cup) on 6 November, just two years after they ere established. They lost 84–68 away to Bosnian team KK Bosna in Sarajevo.
- During the early hours of 10 November, Guildford star Brian Dux was involved in a serious car accident and fell into a coma. He was finally rushed to hospital over two hours after his car was found, and put into immediate intensive care.
- The BBL Cup Final took place at the National Indoor Arena, in Birmingham, on 13 January 2008. A sell-out crowd of over 6,000 people saw a valiant Milton Keynes Lions comeback over Newcastle Eagles to claim their first ever piece of silverware, with a 69–66 victory.
- A television deal was struck on 17 February with international broadcaster Setanta Sports which began with the 2008 Trophy Final and saw one game a week shown live on Setanta Sports 2 every Wednesday.
- Despite having an earlier attempt to relocate to Telford blocked by the BBL, Birmingham Panthers played their first game at Telford's TCAT Arena on 17 February against Newcastle Eagles, who stormed to a 59–104 victory. The temporary move suggested the franchise may relocate to Telford after just one season in Birmingham.
- Guildford triumphed with their first ever BBL Trophy victory over Newcastle at the Plymouth Pavilions on 2 March. In front of a sell-out crowd and broadcast live on Setanta Sports 2, the Heat ran out 86-79 winners in the action-packed final.

== BBL Championship (Tier 1) ==
=== Final standings ===
Pos	Team	Pld	W	L	%	Pts
1	Newcastle Eagles	33	29	4	0.879	58
2	Guildford Heat	33	24	9	0.727	48
3	Plymouth Raiders	33	24	9	0.727	48
4	Milton Keynes Lions	33	19	14	0.576	38
5	Scottish Rocks	33	18	15	0.545	36
6	Sheffield Sharks	33	17	16	0.515	34
7	Everton Tigers	33	16	17	0.485	32
8	Worcester Wolves	33	14	19	0.424	28
9	London Capital	33	12	21	0.364	24
10	Leicester Riders	33	10	23	0.303	20
11	Cheshire Jets	33	9	24	0.273	18
12	Birmingham Panthers	33	6	27	0.182	12

= League winners
= Qualified for the play-offs

=== Playoffs ===
Quarter-finals
1	Newcastle Eagles	105
8	Worcester Wolves	96
4	Milton Keynes Lions	105
5	Scottish Rocks	93
2	Guildford Heat	81
7	Everton Tigers	72
3	Plymouth Raiders	91
6	Sheffield Sharks	73

Semi-finals
1	Newcastle Eagles	63
4	Milton Keynes Lions	72
2	Guildford Heat	81
3	Plymouth Raiders	66

Final
4	Milton Keynes Lions	88
2	Guildford Heat	100
Third place
1	Newcastle Eagles	92
3	Plymouth Raiders	96

==== Quarter-finals ====
23 April 2008

Milton Keynes Lions	105–93	Scottish Rocks

Bletchley Centre, Milton Keynes

24 April 2008

Newcastle Eagles	105–96	Worcester Wolves

Metro Radio Arena, Newcastle upon Tyne

26 April 2008

Plymouth Raiders	91–73	Sheffield Sharks

Plymouth Pavilions, Plymouth

27 April 2008

Guildford Heat	81–72	Everton Tigers

Guildford Spectrum, Guildford

==== Semi-finals ====
3 May 2008

Newcastle Eagles	63–72	Milton Keynes Lions

National Indoor Arena, Birmingham

3 May 2008

Guildford Heat	81–66	Plymouth Raiders

National Indoor Arena, Birmingham

==== Third-place game ====
4 May 2008

Newcastle Eagles	92–96	Plymouth Raiders

National Indoor Arena, Birmingham

==== Final ====
4 May 2008
5.00pm GMT

Report

Guildford Heat	100–88	Milton Keynes Lions
Scoring by quarter: 24-21, 18-20, 25-20, 33-27
Pts: Daniel Gilbert 27, Mike Martin 25, Tony Dorsey 19; Rebs: Mike Martin 10		Pts: Dru Spinks 22, Yorick Williams 13, Terrell Brown 10; Rebs: Robert Youngblood 7

National Indoor Arena, Birmingham

== National League Division 1 (Tier 2) ==
=== Final standings ===
Pos	Team	Pld	W	L	%	Pts
1	Manchester Magic	18	16	2	0.889	32
2	Reading Rockets	18	16	2	0.889	32
3	Worthing Thunder	18	14	4	0.778	28
4	Bristol Academy Flyers	18	10	8	0.556	20
5	London Leopards	18	9	9	0.500	18
6	Derby Trailblazers	18	8	10	0.444	16
7	City of Sheffield Arrows	18	8	10	0.444	16
8	Taunton Tigers	18	5	13	0.278	10
9	Coventry Crusaders	18	4	14	0.222	8
10	King's Lynn Fury	18	0	18	0.000	0

= League winners
= Qualified for the play-offs

== National League Division 2 (Tier 3) ==
=== Final standings ===
Pos	Team	Pld	W	L	%	Pts
1	Tees Valley Mohawks	22	18	4	0.818	36
2	Cardiff Celts	22	18	4	0.818	36
3	Birmingham Aston Athletics	22	15	7	0.682	30
4	University of Birmingham	22	13	9	0.591	26
5	Leicester Warriors	22	13	9	0.591	26
6	Plymouth Marjon Cannons	22	12	10	0.545	24
7	Team Northumbria	22	12	10	0.545	24
8	Northampton Neptunes	22	10	12	0.455	20
9	Kent Crusaders	22	7	15	0.318	14
10	Plymouth Raiders II	22	6	16	0.273	12
11	Newi Nets	22	5	17	0.227	10
12	University of Wolverhampton	22	3	19	0.136	6

= League winners
= Qualified for the play-offs

== Cup Winners' Cup ==
The 2007–08 season saw the inauguration of the BBL's newest competition, the Cup Winners' Cup. The pre-season event between last season's winners of the BBL Cup and BBL Trophy was staged over two legs with the winner determined by the final aggregate score.

Guildford Heat claimed the upper-hand in the first leg away to Plymouth Raiders with an 83–77 victory, despite being ahead by 18-points, Raiders kept fighting and eventually clawed the game back before losing in the final minutes.

The second leg in Guildford was an equally tight affair, but Heat's strength combined with Raiders' poor free-throw shooting, gave them a 93–91 victory, tallying up to a 176–168 win on aggregate.

9 September 2007
4.00pm GMT

Report

Plymouth Raiders	77–83	Guildford Heat
Scoring by quarter: 13-20, 16-23, 24-17, 24-23
Pts: DeAntoine Beasley, 23		Pts: Brian Dux/Mike Martin, 17

Plymouth Pavilions, Plymouth

15 September 2007
7.00pm GMT

Report

Guildford Heat	93–90	Plymouth Raiders
Scoring by quarter: 25-20, 22-21, 14-20, 32-29
Pts: Daniel Gilbert, 20; Rebs: Mike Martin, 12		Pts: Andrew Lasker, 21; Rebs: Gaylon Moore, 13
Guildford win on aggregate, 176–168

Guildford Spectrum, Guildford

== BBL Cup ==
For the 2007–08 edition of the BBL Cup, the top three ranking teams from last season's BBL Championship – Guildford Heat, Sheffield Sharks and Newcastle Eagles – plus the Milton Keynes Lions, all received a bye into the Quarter-final, leaving the remaining eight clubs to battle it out in the First Round.

=== First round ===
27 September 2007

Leicester Riders	79–73	Birmingham Panthers

John Sandford Centre, Leicester

4 November 2007

Scottish Rocks	84–55	Worcester Wolves

Braehead Arena, Glasgow

4 November 2007

Plymouth Raiders	74–83	London Capital

Plymouth Pavilions, Plymouth

4 November 2007

Cheshire Jets	93–80	Everton Tigers

Northgate Arena, Cheshire

=== Quarter-finals ===
23 November 2007

Sheffield Sharks	59–73	Scottish Rocks

English Institute of Sport, Sheffield

25 November 2007

Guildford Heat	107–85	Leicester Riders

Guildford Spectrum, Guildford

25 November 2007

Newcastle Eagles	96–79	Cheshire Jets

Metro Radio Arena, Newcastle

25 November 2007

London Capital	73–78	Milton Keynes Lions

Capital City Academy, London

=== Semi-finals ===
15 December 2007

Scottish Rocks	69–75	Newcastle Eagles

K2 Arena, Crawley

15 December 2007

Milton Keynes Lions	91–80	Guildford Heat

K2 Arena, Crawley

=== Final ===
13 January 2008

Report

Milton Keynes Lions	69–66	Newcastle Eagles
Scoring by quarter: 9-13, 24-15, 24-17, 12-21
Pts: Kevin Griffin (MVP) 24, Tony Windless 22, Yorick Williams 9		Pts: Charles Smith 21, Andrew Bridge 18, Lynard Stewart 12

National Indoor Arena, Birmingham

== BBL Trophy ==
This season's BBL Trophy was slightly reformatted from the previous edition of the tournament. The first round comprised three groups of three and one group of four. Gone were the lower league clubs for the English Basketball League and Scottish Basketball League, with the exception of the previous year's EBL Division 1 champions Worthing Thunder, who stepped in to fill the spot vacated by London United, who withdrew prior to the season opener.

Each team played each other twice, once home and once away, and after each group campaign is completed, the top team from each group advanced into the semi-finals. If teams tied on points (2 for a win, 0 for a loss), head-to-head results would come into play.

=== Group stage ===
Group 1

Team	Pts	Pld	W	L	Per cent
1.Cheshire Jets	8	6	4	2	0.666
2.Plymouth Raiders	8	6	4	2	0.666
3.Milton Keynes Lions	6	6	3	3	0.500
4.Leicester Riders	2	6	1	5	0.166

Group 2

Team	Pts	Pld	W	L	Per cent
1.Guildford Heat	8	4	4	0	1.000
2.London Capital	4	4	2	2	0.500
3.Worthing Thunder	0	4	0	4	0.000

Group 3

Team	Pts	Pld	W	L	Per cent
1.Worcester Wolves	8	4	4	0	1.000
2.Sheffield Sharks	4	4	2	2	0.500
3.Birmingham Panthers	0	4	0	4	0.000

Group 4

Team	Pts	Pld	W	L	Per cent
1.Newcastle Eagles	6	4	3	1	0.750
2.Scottish Rocks	6	4	3	1	0.750
3.Everton Tigers	0	4	0	4	0.000

==== Semi-finals ====
2 February 2008

Worcester Wolves	75–81	Guildford Heat

Ponds Forge, Sheffield

2 February 2008

Newcastle Eagles	105–75	Cheshire Jets

Ponds Forge, Sheffield

==== Final ====
The Final for this season's BBL Trophy was held on 2 March 2008, at the Pavilions in Plymouth, the first time the venue has hosted a major final. It was a 'North-South' final contested between Newcastle Eagles and Guildford Heat, and was broadcast live on television, on Setanta Sports 2, and also BBC Radio Newcastle.

Newcastle had been leading 47–35 at the half, but a Guildford comeback led by Most Valuable Player E. J. Harrison and Daniel Gilbert, overhauled the Eagles for their first trophy of the season, after the league and cup double of last season. Harrison scored 10 of his 25 points in the closing quarter with Gilbert scoring 3 in the last minute to cement the trophy for the Heat. Lynard Stewart led all scorers in the match with 26 points, but this was not enough for Newcastle as Fabulous Flournoy's men went down in their second consecutive final after losing to Milton Keynes Lions in the BBL Cup final.

2 March 2008

Report

Guildford Heat	86–79	Newcastle Eagles
Scoring by quarter: 21-20, 14-27, 30-14, 21-18
Pts: E. J. Harrison 25, Daniel Gilbert 25, Mike Martin 13		Pts: Lynard Stewart 26, Andrew Bridge 12, Olu Babalola 11

Plymouth Pavilions, Plymouth

== Statistics leaders ==
Category	Player	Stat
Points per game	(United States) James Life (Worcester Wolves)	25.9
Rebounds per game	(Trinidad and Tobago) (United Kingdom) Shawn Myers (Cheshire Jets)	11.3
Assists per game	(Canada) (United Kingdom) James Whyte (Sheffield Sharks)	7.0
Steals per game	(United States) Maurice Hampton (Scottish Rocks)	2.9
Blocks per game	(Barbados) Andrew Alleyne (Leicester Riders)	1.4
Field goal percentage	(United States) (United Kingdom) Lynard Stewart (Newcastle Eagles)	65.9%
Free throw percentage	(United States) (United Kingdom) Charles Smith (Newcastle Eagles)	87.0%
Three-point field goal percentage	(United Kingdom) Chris Haslam (Everton Tigers)	48.5%

== Monthly awards ==
Month	Coach	Player
October	(United States) (United Kingdom) Fabulous Flournoy (Newcastle Eagles)	(Trinidad and Tobago) (United Kingdom) Shawn Myers (Cheshire Jets)
November	(United States) (United Kingdom) Sterling Davis (Scottish Rocks)	(United States) Anthony Paez (Worcester Wolves)
December	(United Kingdom) Vince Macaulay-Razaq (Milton Keynes Lions)	(United States) Charles Smith (Newcastle Eagles)
January	(United States) (United Kingdom) Sterling Davis (Scottish Rocks)	(United States) (Nigeria) Jayson Obazuaye (Cheshire Jets)
February	(United States) (United Kingdom) Fabulous Flournoy (Newcastle Eagles)	(United States) (United Kingdom) Tony Dorsey (Guildford Heat)

== Seasonal awards ==
- Most Valuable Player: Lynard Stewart (Newcastle Eagles)
- Coach of the Year: Vince Macaulay-Razaq (Milton Keynes Lions)
- All-Star First Team:
  - Lynard Stewart (Newcastle Eagles)
  - Anthony Paez (Worcester Wolves)
  - Andrew Lasker (Plymouth Raiders)
  - Danny Gilbert (Guildford Heat)
  - Robert Yanders (Scottish Rocks)
- All-Star Second Team:
  - Tony Dorsey (Guildford Heat)
  - Jayson Obazuaye (Cheshire Jets)
  - Yorick Williams (Milton Keynes Lions)
  - E.J. Morrison (Guildford Heat)
  - James Life (Worcester Wolves)

Preceded by 2006–07 season	BBL seasons 2007–08	Succeeded by 2008–09 season
