= 2008–09 British Basketball League season =

2008–09 BBL season
- League: British Basketball League
- Sport: Basketball

Roll of Honour
- BBL champions: Newcastle Eagles
- Play Off's champions: Newcastle Eagles
- BBL Cup champions: Everton Tigers
- BBL Trophy champions: Newcastle Eagles

British Basketball League seasons
- 2007–08 2009–10

The 2008–09 BBL season was the 22nd campaign in the history of the British Basketball League (BBL), which commenced on 14 September 2008 with the Cup Winners' Cup. The regular season began a week later with 12 teams competing, though a line-up change saw the Birmingham Panthers withdraw and fold during close season and the inclusion of Worthing Thunder from the English Basketball League.

Newcastle Eagles continued their dominance of Britain's basketball scene, scooping up the League title, the Play-off crown and the BBL Trophy, beating rivals Guildford Heat 71-83 at the Guildford Spectrum. After a promising rookie season for Everton Tigers in 2007–08, the Merseyside team came of age in their sophomore year, finishing as runners-up in the League and the play-offs whilst entering the record books for their 103-49 win in the BBL Cup Final against Plymouth Raiders, the biggest winning margin (54 points) in BBL history and lowest ever score conceded in a Final.

This season also saw the return of the BBL All-Star game, which was played as a warm-up to the play-off Grand Final. Two select-teams – the British All-Stars and the Rest of the World All-Stars – were pitted together using a selection of players from across the League, with the Rest of the World team narrowly winning 117-124.

== Teams ==
Locations of the 2008–09 BBL teams

Team	City/Area	Arena	Capacity	Last season
Cheshire Jets	Chester	Northgate Arena	1,000	11th
Everton Tigers	Liverpool	Echo Arena & Greenbank Sports Academy	7,513; 600	7th
Guildford Heat	Guildford	Guildford Spectrum	1,100	2nd
Leicester Riders	Leicester	John Sandford Centre	800	10th
London Capital	London	Capital City Academy	300	9th
Milton Keynes Lions	Milton Keynes	Bletchley Centre	800	4th
Newcastle Eagles	Newcastle upon Tyne	Metro Radio Arena	6,500	1st
Plymouth Raiders	Plymouth	Plymouth Pavilions	1,480	3rd
Scottish Rocks	Glasgow	Kelvin Hall	1,200	5th
Sheffield Sharks	Sheffield	English Institute of Sport	1,200	6th
Worcester Wolves	Worcester	University of Worcester	600	8th
Worthing Thunder	Worthing	Worthing Leisure Centre	1,000	New

== Notable occurrences ==
- Following a disastrous rookie campaign and lack of investment the Birmingham Panthers franchise folded during the close season and would not return for the 2008–09 season.
- The gap vacated by Panthers was subsequently occupied by Worthing Thunder who stepped up from the English Basketball League Division 1. Though their application was accepted before the Panthers folded, Worthing were one of two South-coast franchises bidding for a place in the BBL, with an unsuccessful bid coming from Brighton Cougars.
- The second edition of the Cup Winners' Cup saw Guildford Heat sweep away the honours yet again with a closely fought two-game series against last season's BBL Cup winners Milton Keynes Lions. Heat ran out victors with a 159-149 aggregate score.

== BBL Championship (Tier 1) ==
=== Final standings ===
Pos	Team	Pld	W	L	%	Pts
1	Newcastle Eagles	33	28	5	0.848	56
2	Everton Tigers	33	24	9	0.727	48
3	Leicester Riders	33	21	12	0.636	42
4	Guildford Heat	33	21	12	0.636	42
5	Plymouth Raiders	33	20	13	0.606	40
6	Sheffield Sharks	33	16	17	0.485	32
7	Scottish Rocks	33	16	17	0.485	32
8	Cheshire Jets	33	15	18	0.454	30
9	Milton Keynes Lions	33	14	19	0.424	28
10	Worcester Wolves	33	11	22	0.333	22
11	Worthing Thunder	33	10	23	0.303	20
12	London Capital	33	2	31	0.060	4

= League winners
= Qualified for the play-offs

=== Playoffs ===
Quarter-finals
1	Newcastle Eagles	88
8	Cheshire Jets	83
4	Guildford Heat	81
5	Plymouth Raiders	89
2	Everton Tigers	84
7	Scottish Rocks	64
3	Leicester Riders	72
6	Sheffield Sharks	71

Semi-finals
1	Newcastle Eagles	93
5	Plymouth Raiders	71
2	Everton Tigers	81
3	Leicester Riders	65

Final
1	Newcastle Eagles	87
2	Everton Tigers	84

==== Quarter-finals ====
22 April 2009

Leicester Riders	72–71	Sheffield Sharks

John Sandford Centre, Leicester

24 April 2009

Newcastle Eagles	88–83	Cheshire Jets

Metro Radio Arena, Newcastle upon Tyne

24 April 2009

Everton Tigers	84–64	Scottish Rocks

Greenbank Sports Academy, Liverpool

26 April 2009

Guildford Heat	81–89	Plymouth Raiders

Guildford Spectrum, Guildford

==== Semi-finals ====
2 May 2009

Newcastle Eagles	93–71	Plymouth Raiders

National Indoor Arena, Birmingham

2 May 2009

Everton Tigers	81–65	Leicester Riders

National Indoor Arena, Birmingham

==== Final ====
3 May 2009
3.30pm GMT

Report

Newcastle Eagles	87–84	Everton Tigers
Scoring by quarter: 36-17, 15-23, 19-12, 17-32
Pts: Trey Moore 22, Reggie Jackson 19, Darius Defoe 18, Charles Smith 8, Fab Flournoy 7, Tafari Toney 7, Andrew Bridge 6		Pts: Richard Midgley 36, Olu Babalola 25, Marcus Bailey 8, Josh Gross 6, Tony Dorsey 5, Chris Haslam 2, James Jones 2

National Indoor Arena, Birmingham

== Cup Winners' Cup ==
The Cup Winners' Cup was contested between the winners of the BBL Cup and BBL Trophy from the previous season. Guildford were winners of the Trophy and Milton Keynes were winners of the Cup. The tournament was played over two-legs – one at each home arena – and the winner decided by a total aggregate score from both games.

=== First leg ===
14 September 2008
3.00pm GMT

Report

Guildford Heat	91–89	Milton Keynes Lions
Scoring by quarter: 29-27, 24-24, 16-17, 22-21
Pts: Yorick Williams, 23		Pts: Brad Jones, 20

Guildford Spectrum, Guildford

=== Second leg ===
19 September 2008
7.30pm GMT

Report

Milton Keynes Lions	60–68	Guildford Heat
Scoring by quarter: 9-18, 22-20, 11-13, 18-17
Pts: Robert Youngblood, 14; Rebs: Robert Youngblood, 10		Pts: Keonta Howell, 18; Rebs: Keonta Howell, 11

Bletchley Centre, Milton Keynes

Guildford Heat win 159-149 on aggregate scoring.

== EBL National League Division 1 (Tier 2) ==
=== Final standings ===
Pos	Team	Pld	W	L	%	Pts
1	Reading Rockets	18	18	0	1.000	36
2	Manchester Magic	18	15	3	0.833	30
3	London Leopards	18	12	6	0.667	24
4	City of Sheffield Arrows	18	10	8	0.556	20
5	Bristol Academy Flyers	18	9	9	0.500	18
6	Coventry Crusaders	18	8	10	0.444	16
7	Tees Valley Mohawks	18	8	10	0.444	16
8	Derby Trailblazers	18	5	13	0.278	10
9	Cardiff Celts	18	3	15	0.167	6
10	Taunton Tigers	18	2	16	0.111	4

= League winners
= Qualified for the play-offs

== EBL National League Division 2 (Tier 3) ==
=== Final standings ===
Pos	Team	Pld	W	L	%	Pts
1	Leeds Carnegie	22	18	4	0.818	36
2	London Mets	22	17	5	0.773	34
3	Leicester Warriors	22	15	7	0.682	30
4	Birmingham A's	22	14	8	0.636	28
5	Kent Crusaders	22	13	9	0.591	26
6	Team Northumbria	22	12	10	0.545	24
7	Plymouth Raiders II	22	10	12	0.455	20
8	Newi Nets	22	10	12	0.455	20
9	Colchester Hornets	22	8	14	0.364	16
10	Plymouth Marjon Cannons	22	8	14	0.364	16
11	Northampton Neptunes	22	5	17	0.227	10
12	University of Birmingham	22	2	20	0.091	4

= League winners
= Qualified for the play-offs

== BBL Cup ==
Of the 12 competing teams in this season's BBL Cup, eight entered into the First Round while the top-four ranked teams from last season's Championship – Guildford Heat, Milton Keynes Lions, Newcastle Eagles and Plymouth Raiders – received byes into the quarter-finals, where they would also receive home-court advantage.

=== First round ===
18 October 2008

Leicester Riders	99–75	Worthing Thunder

John Sandford Centre, Leicester

20 October 2008

Worcester Wolves	80–89	Sheffield Sharks

University of Worcester, Worcester

20 October 2008

Scottish Rocks	69–88	Everton Tigers

Kelvin Hall, Glasgow

20 October 2008

Cheshire Jets	88–73	London Capital

Northgate Arena, Cheshire

=== Quarter-finals ===
26 October 2008

Plymouth Raiders	101–76	Leicester Riders

Plymouth Pavilions, Plymouth

29 October 2008

Guildford Heat	78–74	Sheffield Sharks

Guildford Spectrum, Guildford

31 October 2008

Newcastle Eagles	112–92	Cheshire Jets

Metro Radio Arena, Newcastle upon Tyne

2 November 2008

Milton Keynes Lions	75–97	Everton Tigers

Bletchley Centre, Milton Keynes

=== Semi-finals 1st leg ===
23 November 2008

Guildford Heat	73–88	Plymouth Raiders

Guildford Spectrum, Guildford

29 November 2008

Newcastle Eagles	112–105	Everton Tigers

Metro Radio Arena, Newcastle upon Tyne

=== Semi-finals 2nd leg ===
26 November 2008

Plymouth Raiders	74–69	Guildford Heat

Plymouth Pavilions, Plymouth

5 December 2008

Everton Tigers	97–86	Newcastle Eagles

Greenbank Sports Academy, Liverpool

Plymouth Raiders win 162-142 on aggregate and Everton Tigers win 202-198 on aggregate.

=== Final ===
18 January 2009
3.30pm GMT

Report

Plymouth Raiders	49–103	Everton Tigers
Scoring by quarter: 11-20, 11-30, 6-22, 21-31
Pts: Gaylon Moore 19, Andrew Lasker 9, Allister Gall 8, Kwbana Beckles 5, Terrence Durham 4, James Noel 4		Pts: Andre Smith 26, Marcus Bailey 26, Richard Midgley 16, James Jones 11, Olu Babalola 11, Delm Herriman 7

National Indoor Arena, Birmingham

== BBL Trophy ==
The First Round of the BBL Trophy uses its usually round-robin format with the 12 competing teams divided into four regionalised groups with the winner of each group then advancing to a two-legged Semi-final encounter and progress to the Final being determined by a total aggregate score.

=== Group stage ===
Group 1

Team	Pts	Pld	W	L	Percent
1.Newcastle Eagles	6	4	3	1	0.750
2.Sheffield Sharks	4	4	2	2	0.500
3.Scottish Rocks	2	4	1	3	0.250

Group 3

Team	Pts	Pld	W	L	Percent
1.Guildford Heat	8	4	4	0	1.000
2.Milton Keynes Lions	4	4	2	2	0.500
3.London Capital	0	4	0	4	0.000

Group 2

Team	Pts	Pld	W	L	Percent
1.Everton Tigers	8	4	4	0	1.000
2.Cheshire Jets	4	4	2	2	0.500
3.Leicester Riders	0	4	0	4	0.000

Group 4

Team	Pts	Pld	W	L	Percent
1.Plymouth Raiders	6	4	3	1	0.750
2.Worcester Wolves	4	4	2	2	0.500
3.Worthing Thunder	2	4	1	3	0.250

=== Semi-finals 1st leg ===
14 February 2009

Plymouth Raiders	76–97	Guildford Heat

Plymouth Pavilions, Plymouth

17 February 2009

Everton Tigers	82–88	Newcastle Eagles

Greenbank Sports Academy, Liverpool

=== Semi-finals 2nd leg ===
18 February 2009

Guildford Heat	90–85	Plymouth Raiders

Guildford Spectrum, Guildford

20 February 2009

Newcastle Eagles	88–77	Everton Tigers

Metro Radio Arena, Newcastle upon Tyne

Guildford Heat win 187-161 on aggregate and Newcastle Eagles win 176-159 on aggregate.

=== Final ===
15 March 2009
3.15pm GMT

Report

Guildford Heat	71–83	Newcastle Eagles
Scoring by quarter: 21-17, 21-22, 12-23, 17-21
Pts: Keonta Howell 30, Michael Martin 12, Kabir Abu 9		Pts: Trey Moore (MVP) 28, Andrew Bridge 17, Reggie Jackson 13, Darius Defoe 11, Tafari Toney 10

Guildford Spectrum, Guildford

== All-Star Game ==
5 May 2009
1.30pm GMT

Great Britain All-Stars	117–124	Rest of the World All-Stars
Scoring by quarter: 33-33, 22-27, 34-40, 28-24
Pts: Chris Sanders, 30; Rebs: Chris Sanders, 9 Asts: Anthony Martin, 7		Pts: Andrew Lasker, 22; Rebs: Frank Phiffer, 9 Asts: Ryan Patton, 4

National Indoor Arena, Birmingham

Great Britain All-Stars
Num.	Player	Team
Starters
5	(United Kingdom) Yorick Williams	Milton Keynes Lions
12	(United Kingdom) Anthony Martin	Plymouth Raiders
15	(United Kingdom) Barry Lamble	Leicester Riders
20	(United States) (United Kingdom) Gaylon Moore	Plymouth Raiders
22	(United Kingdom) Mike Martin	Guildford Heat
Reserves
4	(United Kingdom) Daniel Hildreth	Worthing Thunder
8	(United Kingdom) Darren Mills	London Capital
9	(United Kingdom) Steven Gayle	Cheshire Jets
10	(United Kingdom) Daniel Sandell	Guildford Heat
11	(United Kingdom) Dru Spinks	Milton Keynes Lions
14	(United Kingdom) Chris Sanders	Sheffield Sharks
21	(Ghana) (United Kingdom) Ibrahim Gariba	London Capital

Rest of the World All-Stars
Num.	Player	Team
Starters
4	(United States) Ryan Patton	Worthing Thunder
10	(United States) Duane James	Leicester Riders
11	(United States) Andrew Lasker	Plymouth Raiders
21	(France) Harry Disy	Worcester Wolves
23	(United States) Matt Gorman	Sheffield Sharks
Reserves
5	(United States) (Poland) Bradd Wierzbicki	Leicester Riders
7	(United States) Keonta Howell	Guildford Heat
8	(Lithuania) Janis Ivanokskis	Worthing Thunder
12	(Lithuania) Vidmantas Uzkuraitis	Worcester Wolves
14	(United States) DeAntoine Beasley	Plymouth Raiders
20	(United States) Chad McKnight	Guildford Heat
22	(United States) Frank Phiffer	Cheshire Jets

== Seasonal awards ==
- Most Valuable Player: Trey Moore (Newcastle)
- Coach of the Year: Rob Paternostro (Leicester)
- All-Star First Team:
  - Trey Moore (Newcastle)
  - Andre Smith (Everton)
  - Keonta Howell (Guildford)
  - Robert Yanders (Scots Rocks)
  - Tommy Swanson (Leicester)
- All-Star Second Team:
  - Mike Martin (Guildford)
  - Josh Gross (Everton)
  - Andrew Lasker (Plymouth)
  - Anthony Paez (Worcester)
  - Chris Sanders (Sheffield)

Preceded by 2007–08 season	BBL seasons 2008–09	Succeeded by 2009–10 season
