= 1998–99 British Basketball League season =

1998–99 BBL season
- League: British Basketball League
- Sport: Basketball

Roll of Honour
- BBL champions: Sheffield Sharks
- Play Off's champions: London Towers
- National Cup champions: Sheffield Sharks
- BBL Trophy champions: Manchester Giants

British Basketball League seasons
- 1997–98 1999–2000

The 1998–99 BBL season was the 12th season of the British Basketball League, known as the Budweiser Basketball League for sponsorship reasons, since its establishment in 1987. The regular season commenced on September 12, 1998, and ended on April 4, 1999, with a total of 13 teams competing, playing 36 games each. The post-season Play-offs began on April 9 and culminated in the end-of-season finale on May 2 at Wembley Arena.

Start-up franchise Edinburgh Rocks became the League's newest member following their addition as the 14th franchise during the pre-season and the first Scottish team to appear in the top-flight since Glasgow Rangers' participation in the 1988–89 season. The League membership was reduced to 13 teams shortly after following the merger of the London Towers and Crystal Palace franchises, whilst another notable change was the uprooting of Watford Royals, who moved to the Bletchley Centre in Milton Keynes to become the Milton Keynes Lions.

Sheffield Sharks were a dominant force throughout the season, winning the Sainsbury's Classic Cola Cup whilst storming the Budweiser League and taking the Championship to complete the "Double". The campaign came down to a memorable final game where Sharks claimed the title from rivals Manchester Giants with the last shot of the game, winning 85–87 to take the crown. Their successful run fell short in the play-offs however, managing only a third-placed finish thus allowing a new-look London Towers to claim the title. Manchester Giants also ended a decade-long drought of silverware with their win in the uni-ball Trophy.

No teams participated in European competition after Birmingham Bullets and Greater London Leopards both declined to compete in the Saporta Cup.

== Notable occurrences ==
- Edinburgh Rocks were officially announced as the League's newest franchise on 4 June 1998 – though the Rocks nickname was revealed at a later date – with former NBA player Jim Brandon signed as the team's head coach.
- The London Towers and Crystal Palace teams merged their organisations during the close-season, with the new franchise continuing to use the London Towers branding and utilising the home venues of both clubs, Crystal Palace National Sports Centre and Wembley Arena for home games.
- Watford Royals owner Vince Macaulay announced on 19 June that he was moving the franchise to Milton Keynes due to a lack of suitable venues for home games in Watford, after plans for a new 3,000-capacity arena in Watford, to be built in partnership with Watford F.C., fell through.
- The Budweiser League game between Chester Jets and Derby Storm on 31 January 1999 was abandoned after 30 seconds due to a court invasion from both sets of players following a fight between Chester's Sean Hartley and Derby's England international Yorick Williams. Media reports claim it was the most serious incident in the history of competitive basketball in Britain. Four players were initially ejected from the game, including Williams and Hartley, whilst Chester physio Alison Troughtman was taken to hospital, suffering from a suspected broken-jaw. It was later announced that Williams was suspended for the remainder of the regular season, whilst Derby's Rico Alderson was banned until the following season.
- The Southern All-Stars were victorious in the annual All-Star Game against their Northern rivals, with a 156–158 win at Newcastle Arena on February 27. Edinburgh's Ted Berry was the game-high scorer with 29 points and was named as the games Most Valuable Player.
- Manchester Giants claimed their first piece of silverware in franchise history after defeating Derby in the uni-ball Trophy Final on 13 March. Giants won 90–69, and the 21-point gap between the two teams was the biggest winning margin in the event's history.
- Furthering their ongoing disciplinary issues, it was revealed in April that Derby Storm's American player Maurice Robinson was issued with a one-year suspension for failing to supply a complete urine sample during a Sports Council doping control test.
- The Budweiser League came down to a memorable final game between title-chasing rivals Sheffield Sharks and Manchester Giants in-front of more than 11,000 fans at the MEN Arena. With both teams tied on points at the top of the League table, and tied at 85–85 with just 3.5 seconds left in the game, Terrell Myers took the pass and his 18 ft buzzer-beating jump-shot claimed the title for Sheffield.
- London Towers were crowned as Budweiser League Play-off champions on 2 May, after defeating Thames Valley Tigers 82–71 at Wembley Arena. Towers' Malcolm Leak lead the game's scoring, posting 20 points.
- Nottingham-based businessman Craig Bown purchased the Birmingham Bullets franchise at the end of the season for a reported six-figure sum.

== Budweiser League Championship (Tier 1) ==
=== Final standings ===
Pos	Team	Pld	W	L	%	Pts
1	Sheffield Sharks	36	31	5	0.861	62
2	Manchester Giants	36	30	6	0.833	60
3	London Towers	36	24	12	0.667	48
4	Thames Valley Tigers	36	22	14	0.611	44
5	Newcastle Eagles	36	21	15	0.583	42
6	Derby Storm	36	21	15	0.583	42
7	Birmingham Bullets	36	21	15	0.583	42
8	Greater London Leopards	36	19	17	0.527	38
9	Edinburgh Rocks	36	12	24	0.333	24
10	Milton Keynes Lions	36	10	26	0.278	20
11	Chester Jets	36	10	26	0.278	20
12	Leicester Riders	36	9	27	0.250	18
13	Worthing Bears	36	4	32	0.111	8

= League winners
= Qualified for the play-offs

=== Playoffs ===
==== Quarter-finals ====
(1) Sheffield Sharks vs. (8) Greater London Leopards

April 11, 1999

Greater London Leopards	83–76	Sheffield Sharks

Brentwood Centre, Brentwood

April 14, 1999

Sheffield Sharks	100–82	Greater London Leopards

Ponds Forge, Sheffield

April 16, 1999

Sheffield Sharks	75–68	Greater London Leopards
Sheffield wins series, 2–1

Wembley Arena, London

(2) Manchester Giants vs. (7) Birmingham Bullets

April 11, 1999

Birmingham Bullets	82–74	Manchester Giants

National Exhibition Centre, Birmingham

April 15, 1999

Manchester Giants	78–71	Birmingham Bullets

Manchester Evening News Arena, Manchester

April 17, 1999

Manchester Giants	90–77	Birmingham Bullets
Manchester wins series, 2–1

Manchester Evening News Arena, Manchester

(3) London Towers vs. (5) Newcastle Eagles

April 9, 1999

Newcastle Eagles	78–76	London Towers

Telewest Arena, Newcastle upon Tyne

April 15, 1999

London Towers	91–76	Newcastle Eagles

Wembley Arena, London

April 17, 1999

London Towers	87–68	Newcastle Eagles
London wins series, 2–1

Wembley Arena, London

(4) Thames Valley Tigers vs. (6) Derby Storm

April 10, 1999

Derby Storm	87–91	Thames Valley Tigers

Storm Arena, Derby

April 14, 1999

Thames Valley Tigers	114–93	Derby Storm
Thames Valley wins series, 2–0

Bracknell Leisure Centre, Bracknell

==== Semi-finals ====
May 1, 1999

Sheffield Sharks	78–85	London Towers

Wembley Arena, London

May 1, 1999

Manchester Giants	76–79	Thames Valley Tigers

Wembley Arena, London

==== Third-place game ====
May 2, 1999

Sheffield Sharks	98–88	Manchester Giants

Wembley Arena, London

==== Final ====
May 2, 1999
6.30pm GMT

Report

London Towers	82–71	Thames Valley Tigers
Pts: Malcolm Leak 20, Jason Siemon, Danny Lewis (MVP), Martin Henlan, Randy Duck		Pts: Bryan Balser 22, Mark Jackson, Stewart Clark, Lee Walker

Wembley Arena, London
Attendance: 9,000
Towers coachLino Frattin
Tigers coach Paul James

== National League Division 1 (Tier 2) ==
=== Final standings ===
Pos	Team	Pld	W	L	%	Pts
1	Solent Stars *	26	21	5	0.808	42
2	Plymouth Raiders	26	21	5	0.808	42
3	Guildford Pumas	26	19	7	0.731	38
4	Teesside Mohawks	26	19	7	0.731	38
5	London Towers II	26	17	9	0.654	34
6	Mid-Sussex Magic	26	16	10	0.615	32
7	Cardiff Clippers	26	14	12	0.538	28
8	Coventry Crusaders	26	12	14	0.463	24
9	Westminster Warriors	26	9	17	0.346	18
10	Stevenage Rebels	26	9	17	0.346	18
11	Oxford Devils	26	9	17	0.346	18
12	Solihull Chiefs	26	7	19	0.269	14
13	Cardiff Phoenix	26	6	20	0.231	12
14	Brixton TopCats	26	2	24	0.077	4

= League winners
= Qualified for the play-offs

Champions by virtue of head-to-head record*

=== Playoffs ===
Quarter-finals

Teesside Mohawks	89–76	London Towers II

Plymouth Raiders	111–101	Cardiff Clippers

Guildford Pumas	90–79	Mid-Sussex Magic

Solent Stars	84–79	Coventry Crusaders

Semi-finals

Plymouth Raiders	93–75	Guildford Pumas

Solent Stars	92–113	Teesside Mohawks

Final

Plymouth Raiders	71–66	Teesside Mohawks

Guildford Spectrum

== National League Division 2 (Tier 3) ==
=== Final standings ===
Pos	Team	Pld	W	L	%	Pts
1	Birmingham Bullets II	26	22	4	0.846	44
2	Taunton Tigers	26	21	5	0.808	42
3	City of Manchester Attitude	26	18	8	0.693	36
4	Reading Rockets	26	17	9	0.654	34
5	Liverpool Atac	26	16	10	0.615	32
6	Chessington Wildcats	26	16	10	0.615	32
7	Northampton 89ers	26	15	11	0.577	30
8	Wandsworth Bulls	26	12	14	0.463	24
9	Flintshire Flyers	26	12	14	0.463	24
10	Slough Chargers	26	8	18	0.308	16
11	Swindon Sonics	26	7	19	0.269	14
12	Bournemouth Dolphins	26	7	19	0.269	14
13	Portsmouth Pirates	26	5	21	0.192	10
14	Thames Valley Tigers II	26	5	21	0.192	10

= League winners
= Qualified for the play-offs

=== Playoffs ===
Quarter-finals

Birmingham Bullets B	89–73	Wandsworth Bulls

Taunton Tigers	100–80	Northampton 89ers

Manchester Attitude	90–72	Chessington Wildcats

Reading Rockets	79–91	Liverpool Atac

Semi-finals

Taunton Tigers	80–59	Manchester Attitude

Birmingham Bullets B	76–71	Liverpool Atac

Final

Birmingham Bullets B	79–99	Taunton Tigers

Guildford Spectrum

== National League Division 3 (Tier 4) ==
=== Final standings ===
Pos	Team	Pld	W	L	%	Pts
1	Kingston upon Hull Icebergs	20	18	2	0.900	36
2	North London Lords	20	17	3	0.850	34
3	NW London Wolverines	20	12	8	0.600	24
4	Barking & Dag. Erkenwald	20	12	8	0.600	24
5	Mansfield Express	20	11	9	0.550	22
6	Ware Fire	20	11	9	0.550	22
7	Derbyshire Arrows	20	9	11	0.450	18
8	Cambridge	20	8	12	0.400	16
9	Stoke Stealers	20	6	14	0.300	12
10	Sutton	20	4	16	0.200	8
11	Doncaster Eagles	20	2	18	0.100	4

= League winners
= Qualified for the play-offs

=== Playoffs ===
Quarter-finals

NW London Wolverines	85–64	Ware Fire

North London Lords	82–71	Derbyshire Arrows

Hull Icebergs	80–72	Cambridge

Barking & Dagenham Erkenwald	85–76	Mansfield Express

Semi-finals

Hull Icebergs	90–88	Barking & Dagenham Erkenwald

North London Lords	96–90	NW London Wolverines

Final

Hull Icebergs	58–75	North London Lords

Guildford Spectrum

== Sainsbury's Classic Cola National Cup ==
=== Last 16 ===
Team 1	Team 2	Score
Teesside Mohawks	Sheffield Sharks	83-91
Derby Storm	Worthing Bears	103-82
Manchester Giants	Edinburgh Rocks	90-70
Thames Valley Tigers	London Towers	95-83
Plymouth Raiders	Greater London Leopards	68-100
Stevenage Rebels	Birmingham Bullets	63-106
Leicester Riders	Chester Jets	89-92
Newcastle Eagles	Milton Keynes Lions	77-69

=== Quarter-finals ===
Team 1	Team 2	Score
Sheffield Sharks	Derby Storm	87-76
Manchester Giants	Thames Valley Tigers	87-100
Greater London Leopards	Birmingham Bullets	90-88
Chester Jets	Newcastle Eagles	72-93

=== Semi-finals ===
Team 1	Team 2	Score
Sheffield Sharks	Thames Valley Tigers	78-66
Greater London Leopards	Newcastle Eagles	98-95 OT

=== Final ===
10 January 1999

Sheffield Sharks	67–65	Greater London Leopards
Pts: Terrell Myers (MVP) 29, Travis Conlan 16, Todd Cauthorn, Wilbur Johnson, Ian McKinney		Pts: Tim Moore 25, Rashod Johnson 15, Robert Youngblood 15, Eric Burks, Stedroy Baker

Sheffield Arena
Attendance: ?
Sharks coach Chris Finch
Leopards coach Billy Mims

== uni-ball Trophy ==
=== Group stage ===
Group A

Team	Pts	Pld	W	L	Percent
1.Sheffield Sharks	12	7	6	1	0.857
2.Derby Storm	10	7	5	2	0.714
3.Manchester Giants	10	7	5	2	0.714
4.Chester Jets	8	7	4	3	0.571
5.Leicester Riders	8	7	4	3	0.571
6.Milton Keynes Lions	2	7	1	6	0.142
7.Worthing Bears	0	7	0	7	0.000

Group B

Team	Pts	Pld	W	L	Percent
1.London Towers	8	4	4	0	1.000
2.Birmingham Bullets	6	4	3	1	0.750
3.Newcastle Eagles	4	4	2	2	0.500
4.Greater London Leopards	2	4	1	3	0.250
5.Edinburgh Rocks	0	4	0	4	0.000

=== Quarter-finals ===
January 27, 1999

Birmingham Bullets	62–96	Manchester Giants

Aston Villa Leisure Centre, Birmingham

January 27, 1999

Derby Storm	109–102	Newcastle Eagles

Storm Arena, Derby

January 27, 1999

London Towers	61–62	Leicester Riders

Crystal Palace National Sports Centre, London

January 27, 1999

Sheffield Sharks	82–75	Chester Jets

Ponds Forge, Sheffield

=== Semi-finals ===
Derby Storm vs. Leicester Riders

February 10, 1999

Derby Storm	88–75	Leicester Riders

Storm Arena, Derby

February 18, 1999

Leicester Riders	93–90	Derby Storm
Derby wins on aggregate, 178–168

Granby Halls, Leicester

Sheffield Sharks vs. Manchester Giants

February 10, 1999

Sheffield Sharks	77–81	Manchester Giants

Sheffield Arena, Sheffield

February 17, 1999

Manchester Giants	93–88	Sheffield Sharks
Manchester wins on aggregate, 174–165

Manchester Evening News Arena, Manchester

=== Final ===
March 13, 1999
7.00pm GMT

Report

Manchester Giants	90–69	Derby Storm
Pts: Tony Dorsey 28, Ronnie Baker (MVP) 21, John White 16, Makeba Perry 11		Pts: Joel Burns 20, Nate Reinking 16, Maurice Robinson 14, Martin Ford, John Tresvant

National Exhibition Centre, Birmingham
Attendance: 6,500
Giants coach Nick Nurse
Storm coach Bob Donewald, Jr.

== Dairylea Dunkers All-Star Game ==
February 27, 1999
7.05pm GMT

Report

Northern All-Stars	156–158	Southern All-Stars
Pts: Ted Berry, 29		Pts: Malcolm Leak/Jason Siemon, 24

Telewest Arena, Newcastle upon Tyne

Northern All-Stars
Player	Team
(United States) Tony Dorsey	Manchester Giants
(United States) Terrell Myers	Sheffield Sharks
(United States) Billy Singleton	Leicester Riders
(United States) Nick Browning	Chester Jets
(United States) Ralph Blalock	Newcastle Eagles
(United States) JaRon Boone	Leicester Riders
(United States) Wilbur Johnson	Sheffield Sharks
(United States) Travis Conlon	Sheffield Sharks
(United States) Tony Holley	Manchester Giants
(United States) Ted Berry	Edinburgh Rocks
(United States) Chris Flite	Newcastle Eagles
(United States) Corey Jackson	Newcastle Eagles
Coach
(United States) Nick Nurse	Manchester Giants

Southern All-Stars
Player	Team
(United States) John McCord	Thames Valley Tigers
(United States) Jon Gaines	Worthing Bears
(Barbados) Nigel Lloyd	Birmingham Bullets
(United States) Tony Windless	Milton Keynes Lions
(United States) (Republic of Ireland) Jason Siemon	Thames Valley Tigers
(United States) Reggie Kirk	Birmingham Bullets
(United States) Casey Arena	Thames Valley Tigers
(United States) Danny Lewis	London Towers
(United States) Malcolm Leak	London Towers
(United States) Robert Youngblood	Greater London Leopards
(United States) Eric Burks	Greater London Leopards
(United States) Dwayne Morton	London Towers
Coach
(United States) Billy Mims	Greater London Leopards

== Statistics leaders ==
Category	Player	Stat
Points per game	(United States) John White (Manchester Giants)	26.09
Rebounds per game	(United States) Rico Alderson (Derby Storm)	11.84
Assists per game	(United States) Prentice McGruder (Chester Jets)	8.38
Steals per game	(United States) Casey Arena (Thames Valley Tigers)	3.34
Blocks per game	(United States) James Doyle (Leicester Riders)	2.56

== Seasonal awards ==
- Most Valuable Player: Terrell Myers (Sheffield Sharks)
- Coach of the Year: Chris Finch (Sheffield Sharks)
- All-Star First Team:
  - Terrell Myers (Sheffield Sharks)
  - John White (Manchester Giants)
  - Tony Dorsey (Manchester Giants)
  - John McCord (Thames Valley Tigers)
  - Nigel Lloyd (Birmingham Bullets)
- All-Star Second Team:
  - Tim Moore (Greater London Leopards)
  - Travis Conlan (Sheffield Sharks)
  - Ralph Blalock (Newcastle Eagles)
  - Casey Arena (Thames Valley Tigers)
  - Danny Lewis (London Towers)

Preceded by 1997–98 season	BBL seasons 1998–99	Succeeded by 1999–2000 season
