= 2006–07 British Basketball League season =

2006–07 BBL season
- League: British Basketball League
- Sport: Basketball

Roll of Honour
- BBL champions: Guildford Heat
- Play-off's champions: Newcastle Eagles
- BBL Cup champions: Guildford Heat
- BBL Trophy champions: Plymouth Raiders

British Basketball League seasons
- ← 2005–06 2007–08 →

The 2006–07 BBL season, the 20th since its establishment of the British Basketball League, started on 29 September 2006 when reigning champions Newcastle Eagles began with an 85–83 loss away to Sheffield Sharks.

Ten teams took to the field this season, including two new franchises to the BBL, London United and the Worcester Wolves, who both moved up from the English Basketball League during summer 2006. The new additions were brought in after three teams withdrew from the League before the start of the season. Brighton Bears and London Towers both decided to "park" their respective franchises and take a one-year break whilst Birmingham Bullets also decided to sit out due to a lack of suitable home venues available and have since gone into liquidation.

== Teams ==
Locations of the 2006–07 BBL teams

Team	City/Area	Arena	Capacity	Last season
Chester Jets	Chester	Northgate Arena	1,000	7th
Guildford Heat	Guildford	Guildford Spectrum	1,100	5th
Leicester Riders	Leicester	John Sanford Centre	800	6th
London United	London	SPACe	600	New
Milton Keynes Lions	Milton Keynes	Bletchley Centre	800	10th
Newcastle Eagles	Newcastle upon Tyne	Metro Radio Arena	6,500	1st
Plymouth Raiders	Plymouth	Plymouth Pavilions	1,480	9th
Scottish Rocks	Glasgow	Braehead Arena	4,000	2nd
Sheffield Sharks	Sheffield	English Institute of Sport	1,200	3rd
Worcester Wolves	Worcester	University of Worcester	600	New

== Notable occurrences ==
- Following on from Brighton and Birmingham's decision to withdraw from the league, London Towers announced they were to be the third, and most high-profile team to sit out the upcoming season.
- London United and Worcester Wolves were both elected from the English Basketball League to replace the three departed teams, and to keep franchises in the major markets of London and the Midlands.
- A£2.5 million sponsorship deal was agreed on 22 September 2006, between the BBL and national broadcaster MKTV, including primetime TV coverage of 40 live games per season, high-profile sponsorship and a National Community Development Programme.
- Molten, the world's leading manufacturer of inflatable sports balls, signed a ball sponsorship with the BBL worth £150,000 prior to the season opening. The new GG7 ball was unveiled on 25 September as the official match ball for the next three seasons.
- New league franchise Worcester Wolves record their first ever BBL win on 7 October, an 82–79 home victory against Chester Jets.
- The BBL Cup final took place at the National Indoor Arena, in Birmingham on 7 January 2007, and saw Guildford Heat claim their first Championship since foundation 18 months previous, with an 81–78 win against Scottish Rocks. The game was the first ever BBL match to be broadcast live over the internet, reaching a potentially worldwide audience.
- Plymouth Raiders also won their first silverware since stepping-up to the BBL, with a 74–65 win in the BBL Trophy final against holders Newcastle Eagles on 4 March. Held at Newcastle's Metro Radio Arena, the game was the first to be broadcast live on national television in over four years, as part of the sponsorship agreement with MKTV.
- Leicester Riders guard, and former Los Angeles Lakers star Steve Bucknall, as well as Guildford star Chad McKnight both test positive for marijuana and are each handed a three-month suspension. However, the story only comes to public attention several months later.
- Chester Jets owner and head coach Mike Burton announced prior to their season finale that he would be retiring from the franchise at the end of the season. Burton's announcement, after 19 years at the helm, put serious doubts of the clubs' future.
- Despite leading the League for most of the season, Guildford's one point 90–91 loss away to Scottish Rocks on 1 April, ensured that the title race went down to the wire, and only a final day 114–85 win at home to Chester Jets on 8 April guaranteed the 2007 League crown would belong to the Heat.
- Newcastle, playing in front of their home fans at the Metro Radio Arena on 29 April, were victorious against a resilient Scottish Rocks in the climax to the BBL Finals Weekend and the BBL season, as they claimed their third consecutive Playoff Championship with a 95–82 win.

== BBL Championship (Tier 1) ==
=== Final standings ===
Pos	Team	Pld	W	L	%	Pts
1	Guildford Heat	36	29	7	0.806	58
2	Sheffield Sharks	36	28	8	0.778	56
3	Newcastle Eagles	36	25	11	0.694	50
4	Scottish Rocks	36	22	14	0.611	44
5	Plymouth Raiders	36	20	16	0.556	40
6	Milton Keynes Lions	36	18	18	0.500	36
7	Leicester Riders	36	13	23	0.361	26
8	London United	36	11	25	0.306	22
9	Chester Jets	36	10	26	0.278	20
10	Worcester Wolves	36	4	32	0.111	8

= League winners
= Qualified for the play-offs

=== Playoffs ===
Quarter-finals
1	Guildford Heat	71
8	London United	68
4	Scottish Rocks	83
5	Plymouth Raiders	77
2	Sheffield Sharks	89
7	Leicester Riders	71
3	Newcastle Eagles	110
6	Milton Keynes Lions	84

Semi-finals
1	Guildford Heat	71
4	Scottish Rocks	78
2	Sheffield Sharks	73
3	Newcastle Eagles	83

Final
4	Scottish Rocks	82
3	Newcastle Eagles	95

==== Quarter-finals ====
13 April 2007

Sheffield Sharks	89–71	Leicester Riders

English Institute of Sport, Sheffield

15 April 2007

Guildford Heat	71–68	London United

Guildford Spectrum, Guildford

15 April 2007

Scottish Rocks	83–77	Plymouth Raiders

Braehead Arena, Glasgow

17 April 2007

Newcastle Eagles	110–84	Milton Keynes Lions

Metro Radio Arena, Newcastle upon Tyne

==== Semi-finals ====
28 April 2007

Guildford Heat	71–78	Scottish Rocks

Metro Radio Arena, Newcastle upon Tyne

28 April 2007

Sheffield Sharks	73–83	Newcastle Eagles

Metro Radio Arena, Newcastle upon Tyne

==== Third-place game ====
29 April 2007

Guildford Heat	97–105	Sheffield Sharks

Metro Radio Arena, Newcastle upon Tyne

==== Final ====
29 April 2007

Report

Newcastle Eagles	95–82	Scottish Rocks
Scoring by quarter: 30–23, 17–21, 23–17, 25–21
Pts: Olu Babalola 23, Tony Dorsey 18, Andrew Bridge 17, Shawan Robinson 16, Fab Flournoy 8, Jeremy Hyatt 6, Darius Defoe 5		Pts: Robert Yanders 26, Sterling Davis 16, Maurice Hampton 16, Moritz Wohlers 10, Chris Anrin 5, Gareth Murray 4, Julius Joseph 4

Metro Radio Arena, Newcastle upon Tyne

== National League Division 1 (Tier 2) ==
=== Final standings ===
Pos	Team	Pld	W	L	%	Pts
1	Worthing Thunder	22	21	1	0.955	42
2	Reading Rockets	22	19	3	0.864	38
3	Manchester Magic	22	17	5	0.773	34
4	London Leopards	22	13	9	0.591	26
5	PAWS London Capital	22	13	9	0.591	26
6	West Hertfordshire Warriors	22	11	11	0.500	22
7	City of Sheffield Arrows	22	11	11	0.500	22
8	Solent Stars	22	7	15	0.318	14
9	Coventry Crusaders	22	6	16	0.273	12
10	King's Lynn Fury	22	5	17	0.227	10
11	Teesside Mohawks	22	5	17	0.227	10
12	Northampton Neptunes	22	4	18	0.182	8

= League winners
= Qualified for the play-offs

== National League Division 2 (Tier 3) ==
=== Final standings ===
Pos	Team	Pld	W	L	%	Pts
1	Derby Trailblazers	22	19	3	0.864	38
2	Bristol Academy Flyers	22	19	3	0.864	38
3	Taunton Tigers	22	15	7	0.682	30
4	Team Northumbria	22	14	8	0.636	28
5	Newi Nets	22	12	10	0.545	24
6	Leicester Warriors	22	11	11	0.500	22
7	Birmingham Aston Athletics	22	11	11	0.500	22
8	Tamar Valley Cannons	22	10	12	0.455	20
9	Kent Crusaders	22	7	15	0.318	14
10	Plymouth Raiders II	22	6	16	0.273	12
11	Mansfield Express	22	5	17	0.227	10
12	Liverpool	22	3	19	0.136	6

= League winners
= Qualified for the play-offs

== BBL Cup ==
This season's edition of the BBL Cup saw the two lowest seeds from the previous season's League rankings face off with the BBL's two newest additions – London United and Worcester Wolves – in the first round. As expected, the experience of Milton Keynes and Plymouth paid off and both teams advanced to the quarter-finals to join the rest of their league rivals in the last eight. In the clash of the round, eventual winners Guildford Heat saw off the Plymouth Raiders in a tie dominated by the shooting of Chad McKnight, who posted 39 points for the Heat.

The Semi-finals saw the league's four strongest teams drawn against each other, but while Guildford easily dispatched the visiting Sheffield Sharks, the Cup holders Newcastle Eagles, were defeated by the Scottish Rocks, where Rocks' Robert Yanders netted a game-high 23 points.

In only their second season since establishment, Guildford's success story continued when they scooped their first piece of silverware with an 82–79 victory in the Cup Final against the Rocks. Heat's star guard Brian Dux was named as MVP scoring 21 points on the way to victory.

=== First round ===
20 October 2006

Milton Keynes Lions	83–70	Worcester Wolves

Bletchley Centre, Milton Keynes

22 October 2006

Plymouth Raiders	79–74	London United

Plymouth Pavilions, Plymouth

=== Quarter-finals ===
5 November 2006

Newcastle Eagles	100–74	Milton Keynes Lions

Metro Radio Arena, Newcastle upon Tyne

10 November 2006

Sheffield Sharks	76–64	Leicester Riders

English Institute of Sport, Sheffield

25 November 2006

Guildford Heat	95–88	Plymouth Raiders

Guildford Spectrum, Guildford

12 November 2006

Scottish Rocks	84–79	Chester Jets

Braehead Arena, Glasgow

=== Semi-finals ===
3 December 2006

Guildford Heat	87–81	Sheffield Sharks

Guildford Spectrum, Guildford

10 December 2006

Scottish Rocks	94–69	Newcastle Eagles

Braehead Arena, Glasgow

=== Final ===
7 January 2007

Report

Guildford Heat	82–79	Scottish Rocks
Scoring by quarter: 16–27, 26–9, 15–7, 25–36
Pts: Brian Dux 21, Chad McKnight 20, Dean Williams 10, Dan Wardrope 7, Mike Martin 7, Rod Wellington 7, Daniel Gilbert 6, Chris Brown 3		Pts: Sterling Davis 21, Maurice Hampton 19, Rob Yanders 18, Julius Joseph 9, Moritz Wohlers 7, Hugo Sterk 4

National Indoor Arena, Birmingham

== BBL Trophy ==
Due to the lack of teams competing in this season's Championship, the BBL Trophy featured all 10 BBL teams plus six invited teams, four from the English Basketball League (Coventry Crusaders, London Leopards, Reading Rockets and Worthing Thunder) and two from the Scottish Basketball League (Edinburgh Kings and Troon Tornadoes). The First round saw all 16 teams divided into four regionalised groups with the top finishing team advancing to the Semi-finals.

=== Group stage ===
Northern Group 1

Team	Pts	Pld	W	L	Percent
1.Newcastle Eagles	6	3	3	0	1.000
2.Scottish Rocks	4	3	2	1	0.666
3.Edinburgh Kings	2	3	1	2	0.333
4.Troon Tornadoes	0	3	0	3	0.000

Southern Group 1

Team	Pts	Pld	W	L	Percent
1.Leicester Riders	4	3	2	1	0.666
2.London United	4	3	2	1	0.666
3.Milton Keynes Lions	4	3	2	1	0.666
4.London Leopards	0	3	0	3	0.000

Northern Group 2

Team	Pts	Pld	W	L	Percent
1.Sheffield Sharks	6	3	3	0	1.000
2.Chester Jets	2	3	1	2	0.333
3.Coventry Crusaders	2	3	1	2	0.333
4.Worcester Wolves	2	3	1	2	0.333

Southern Group 2

Team	Pts	Pld	W	L	Percent
1.Plymouth Raiders	6	3	3	0	1.000
2.Guildford Heat	4	3	2	1	0.666
3.Worthing Thunder	2	3	1	2	0.333
4.Reading Rockets	0	3	0	3	0.000

=== Semi-finals ===
9 February 2007

Plymouth Raiders	83–64	Leicester Riders

Plymouth Pavilions, Plymouth

11 February 2007

Sheffield Sharks	55–58	Newcastle Eagles

Ponds Forge, Sheffield

=== Final ===
4 March 2007

Report

Newcastle Eagles	65–74	Plymouth Raiders
Scoring by quarter: 18–21, 17–19, 10–18, 20–16
Pts: Tony Dorsey 20, Shawan Robinson 15, Fab Flournoy 12, Olu Babalola 11, TJ Walker 3, Darius Defoe 2		Pts: Carlton Aaron 25, Gaylon Moore 17, Gavin Love 11, Andrew Lasker 10, DeAntoine Beasley 8, Allister Gall 3

Metro Radio Arena, Newcastle upon Tyne

== Statistics leaders ==
Category	Player	Stat
Points per game	(United States) Jazwyn Cowan (Chester Jets)	23.07
Rebounds per game	(United States) Carlton Aaron (Plymouth Raiders)	12.43
Assists per game	(United States) TJ Walker (Newcastle Eagles)	5.86
Steals per game	(United States) Maurice Hampton (Scottish Rocks)	2.86
Blocks per game	(Barbados) Andrew Alleyne (Leicester Riders)	1.36
Field goal percentage	(United Kingdom) Darius Defoe (Newcastle Eagles)	60.00%
Free throw percentage	(United Kingdom) Dan Wardrope (Guildford Heat)	86.19%
Three-point field goal percentage	(Nigeria) (Belgium) Hugo Sterk (Scottish Rocks)	44.00%

== Monthly awards ==
Month	Coach	Player
October	(United States) Tom Hancock (Milton Keynes Lions)	(United States) (United Kingdom) Tony Windless (Milton Keynes Lions)
November	(United Kingdom) Peter Scantlebury MBE (Sheffield Sharks)	(United States) Carlton Aaron (Plymouth Raiders)
December	(United Kingdom) Paul James (Guildford Heat)	(United States) Jazwyn Cowan (Chester Jets)
January	(United States) (United Kingdom) Fabulous Flournoy (Newcastle Eagles)	(United States) Jeff Bonds (Sheffield Sharks)
February	(United Kingdom) Peter Scantlebury MBE (Sheffield Sharks)	(United Kingdom) Tarick Johnson (London United)
March	(Germany) Thorsten Leibenath (Scottish Rocks)	(United States) Daniel Gilbert (Guildford Heat)

== Seasonal awards ==
- Most Valuable Player: Brian Dux (Guildford Heat) and Jeff Bonds (Sheffield Sharks)
- Coach of the Year: Paul James (Guildford Heat)
- All-Star First Team:
  - Jeff Bonds (Sheffield Sharks)
  - Brian Dux (Guildford Heat)
  - Mike Martin (Guildford Heat)
  - Carlton Aaron (Plymouth Raiders)
  - Robert Yanders (Scottish Rocks)
- All-Star Second Team:
  - Blake Shelton (Sheffield Sharks)
  - Jazwyn Cowan (Chester Jets)
  - Sterling Davis (Scottish Rocks)
  - Tarick Johnson (London United)
  - Fabulous Flournoy (Newcastle Eagles)

Preceded by 2005–06 season	BBL seasons 2006–07	Succeeded by 2007–08 season
