= Tarick =

Tarick is a given name. Notable people with the name include:

- Tarick Johnson (born 1981), American basketball player
- Tarick Salmaci (born 1972), Lebanese-American boxer
- Tarick Ximines (born 2004), Jamaican footballer
