= Birmingham Panthers =

- League: British Basketball League
- Established: 2007
- Folded: 2008
- History: Birmingham Panthers; 2007-2008
- Arena: UoW Walsall Campus
- Location: Birmingham, West Midlands
- Team colours: Black and White
- Ownership: (Jamaica) Herman Wilson
Home	Away

The Birmingham Panthers (official name Team Birmingham Panthers) was a professional basketball club based in the city of Birmingham, England. Established in 2007, the franchise competed in Britain's top-tier league, the British Basketball League during the 2007-08 season, but following a disastrous season and a lack of organisation, the franchise ceased operations in 2008, lasting just one year.

== Franchise history ==
=== Basketball back in Birmingham ===
Following the demise and eventual liquidation of the Birmingham Bullets, one of British basketball's most successful franchises, Birmingham was left without a major basketball team for the 2006-07 season. Though many Bullets fans defected to the Worcester Wolves, elected to the BBL to replace the Bullets and retain professional basketball in the West Midlands, every effort was made for Birmingham to return to the fold for the following season.

On 23 March 2007 it was officially confirmed that Birmingham would be part of the mass-expansion of the BBL, with former Bullets assistant coach Herman Wilson leading a consortium of investors behind the project. Behind the scenes both the BBL and Wilson worked fast to establish a franchise amid speculation of potential rival league the British Basketball Association announcing their own Birmingham franchise for the following season, the Birmingham Athletics.

Within weeks of the initial announcement it was confirmed on 18 April by the BBL that Team Birmingham Panthers would be the eleventh franchise taking to the court for the 2007-08 season, with the Aston Events Centre, a former home of both the Bullets and Athletics, hosting all home games of the new team, with a move to a future arena already planned. Rumours abound that former Bullets coach Tony Garbelotto would be hired by the club were rapidly quashed by Wilson. In the same interview with regional newspaper Birmingham Mail, Wilson was keen to stress that the new club is attempting to cut any links to the former Bullets franchise. Wilson also claimed the Bullets name was not chosen for the new franchise because of connotations with gun crime, a move that was taken by the NBA's Washington Wizards (formerly called Bullets) in 1995. Instead, the name Panthers was opted for in reference to former BBL franchise Doncaster Panthers, where Wilson started his career as a basketball coach as an assistant to Curtis Xavier in the early 1990s.

=== Venue difficulties ===
On 11 September it was announced that due to health and safety risks, the Aston Events Centre was not in a suitable condition to host Panthers' home games, thus a search for an alternative venue was conducted at short notice. The National Indoor Arena and Birmingham Sports Centre were both considered, however the board settled on the 500-seat capacity Nechells Community Sports Centre on Rupert Street in Nechells as their final choice.

Panthers played their inaugural match away on 16 September at local rivals Worcester Wolves in a Pre-Season friendly. Unfortunately for Panthers fans, the team lost 108-81. Luck didn't change a week later when the Panthers took to the court in their first ever league game, away to Leicester Riders, who defeated them with a similar scoreline, 101-79. The fact that none of Birmingham's import players had yet arrived only added to Coach Nigel Lloyd's woes, and just a few days later the clubs' dream of returning professional basketball to the city of Birmingham hung in the balance.

After having to uproot venue from Aston to Nechells, the club were forced again to seek alternative venues to stage home games as the cost and facilities available at their new home did not suit the club. Just days before their first home fixture, against Leicester on 6 October, the Birmingham Mail broke the news that the club were planning to relocate to Telford, 35 miles north of Birmingham. Defeating the object of Panthers' franchise application, the BBL blocked the move in an attempt to keep basketball in Birmingham, and after discussions with the University of Wolverhampton, a deal was struck on 2 October to use their Walsall Campus Sports Centre as the home venue for all of the clubs' games for the upcoming season.

On 21 October the Panthers got their first BBL win at home to local rivals Worcester Wolves. They won the game 98-86 with Daniel Sandell led all scorers with 38 points for the Panthers, while Anthony Paez led the Wolves' scoring with 32. A long and difficult season ensued for the Panthers, who managed to notch up only 6 victories throughout the whole league campaign, coupled with first round exits in both the BBL Cup and BBL Trophy. Their Trophy game with Worcester was switched to the NIA, former home of the Bullets, in a one-off showpiece game but were pipped to the honours losing 91-95.

=== Move to Telford ===
After failing to attract a decent fanbase and support from investors in Birmingham, owner Herman Wilson switched two games to the TCAT Arena at Telford College, rebooting the idea of moving the franchise to Telford permanently despite earlier block's from the league.*Shropshire Warriors Manager/Owner Tom Sunley help back the idea to move to telford by selling out the 500 seater TCAT Arena. Having two young guns sign for the panthers helped the spot light on the idea. Sean Jones and Josh Crutchley suited up for the Panthers with a contract ready to sign to fulfill the Birmingham Panthers roster for the rest of the 2007/08 season. Though the club were seriously considering a move to Telford on a permanent basis (with the possibility of keeping the Birmingham name), the league confirmed that no official request had been made and that the move was only temporary in a bid to promote the club. The team was comfortably beaten in both games at Telford by Newcastle Eagles and Plymouth Raiders, and the club returned to their usual home venue for the remainder of the season.

On 17 April, two days before the final game of the season at home to Everton Tigers, the Birmingham Mail confirmed an application to move the franchise to Telford for the following season had been made by owner Herman Wilson, citing a lack of suitable venues in Birmingham as his main reason. The move fell apart however after Telford's backers pulled out, but with renewed interest from the Aston Events Centre, the possibility of remaining in Birmingham looked increasingly likely. However it was officially announced on 4 June that the Panthers franchise had been withdrawn from the BBL and folded. Despite the ill-fated outcomes Birmingham-based franchises, there is still keen interest in bringing top-level basketball back to the city, with a group headed by Bullets legend and Panthers general manager Clive Allen currently seeking to reignite interest and start a new team.

== Home arenas ==
University of Wolverhampton, Walsall Campus (2007-2008)
TCAT Arena (2008)

== Season-by-season records ==
Season	Division	Tier	Regular Season						Post-Season	Trophy	Cup	Head coach
Season	Division	Tier	Finish	Played	Wins	Losses	Points	Win %	Post-Season	Trophy	Cup	Head coach
Birmingham Panthers
2007–08	BBL	1	12th	33	6	27	12	0.182	Did not qualify	1st round (BT)	1st round (BC)	Nigel Lloyd

== Players ==
- Josh Crutchley
- Adam Williams
- Craig Hopkins
