= London United =

London United may refer to:

- London United (basketball)
- London United Busways
- London United Tramways
