= Daniel Gilbert (basketball) =

American basketball player (born 1983)

Personal information
- Born: February 26, 1983 (age 43) Detroit, Michigan, U.S.
- Listed height: 6 ft 6 in (1.98 m)
- Listed weight: 220 lb (100 kg)

Career information
- High school: Cass Technical (Detroit, Michigan)
- College: Buffalo (2001–2005)
- NBA draft: 2005: undrafted
- Playing career: 2005–2012
- Position: Guard

Career history
- 2005–2006: FC Schalke 04
- 2006–2008: Guildford Heat
- 2008–2009: Boulazac Dordogne
- 2009–2011: Worcester Wolves
- 2011–2012: Montevideo

Career highlights
- BBL champion (2008); BBL Cup champion (2007)

Daniel Gilbert (born February 28, 1983) is an American former professional basketball player. Standing at 6 ft 6 in (1.98 m), he played professionally in four different countries.

Born in Detroit, Michigan, on February 28, 1983, Gilbert attended the University at Buffalo, and in his senior year was part of the memorable Buffalo Bulls team that, led by fellow guard Turner Battle, went on an improbable run to the Mid-American Conference Championship, beating Western Michigan in the semi-finals at the Gund Arena in Cleveland. In the MAC final, the Bulls lost in overtime to Ohio University on a tip-in by Leon Williams with 0.5 seconds remaining, thus, the Bulls failed to clinch the automatic bid to the 2005 NCAA Men's Division I Basketball Tournament.

Gilbert, considered to be one of the best defenders to ever don a Bulls' jersey, averaged 7.6 points, 3.9 rebounds and 1.8 steals his senior season while also setting the school record for games played in a career (118).

Upon graduating in 2005, he went on to sign a professional contract with German second division team FC Schalke. When interviewed after his signing, Gilbert said "I am excited about the opportunity to play professionally, I knew that I would play overseas some day, I am just surprised that it happened so fast." In his one season in Germany, Gilbert averaged 18 points per game, while recording his season-high 33 points in a 92–79 home victory over Rhöndorf.

For the 2006–07 season, Gilbert made the move to England, where he signed for Paul James's Guildford Heat side, who were only in their second year of existence. A major coup for the side, Gilbert became a pivotal player in leading the club to its first ever BBL title. He averaged an impressive 16.9 points in 33.9 minutes per game.

He returned for a second season to lead the Heat into the ULEB Cup, the club's debut in European competition. He aided the team to their first trophy of the season, picking up the BBL Cup Winners' Cup after defeating Plymouth Raiders. In 2008, he signed for French team Boulazac Basket Dordogne but after one year returned to Britain to play under Coach James once again for the Worcester Wolves.
