= Richard Huish College, Taunton =

Richard Huish College
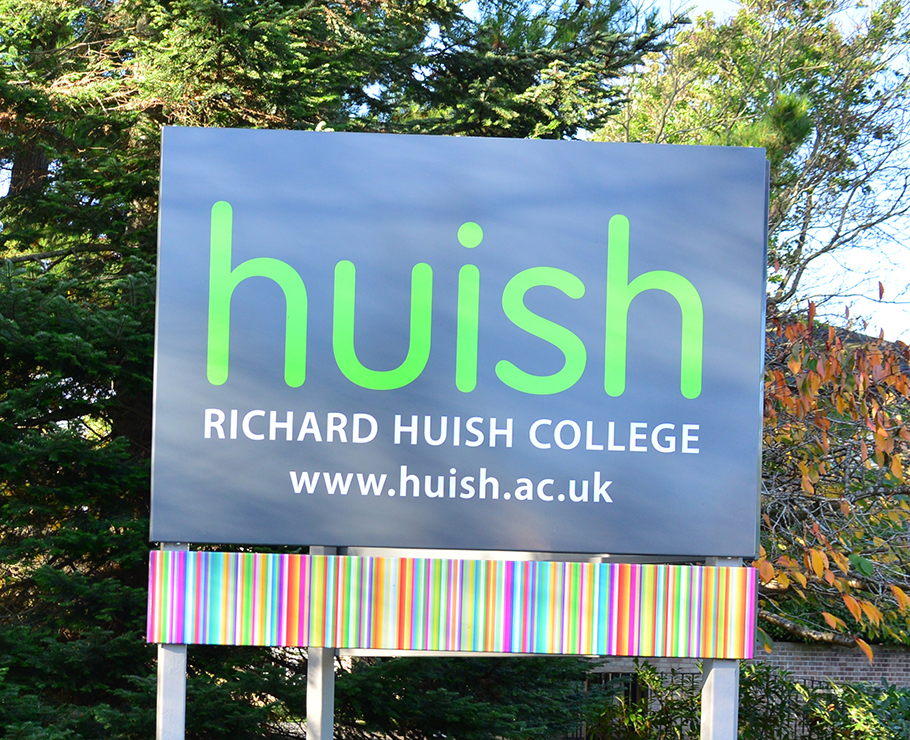
- Richard Huish College Front Sign, December 2015

Location
- South Road; Taunton, Somerset, TA1 3DZ; England

Information
- Local authority: Somerset
- Department for Education URN: 130808 Tables
- Ofsted: Reports
- Principal: Emma Fielding
- Gender: Mixed
- Website: www.huish.ac.uk

Richard Huish College is a further education and sixth-form college in Taunton, Somerset, England. Located on a single site in South Road, about a mile from the centre of Taunton, it offers Level 3 A Level and Vocational courses, as well as Level 2 Pathways.

The college has around 2,200 students and is one of only a few state sixth form colleges to offer boarding.

== History ==
The college is named after Richard Huish, a Taunton wool merchant in the 17th century who invested in property in London. He died in 1615 and his will included an endowment to establish almshouses in Taunton and support local people's university education. Increased income from the properties in the nineteenth century allowed this to be expanded to create both boys and girls schools in Taunton. Huish's Grammar School, the boys' school, opened in 1875 in what are now the town's Municipal Buildings but by 1891 had moved to East Street. The girls' school opened in The Crescent in 1876 but the charity was unable to support both schools so the girls' school was funded by Bishop Fox's endowment from 1890. It became a sixth form college in 1979.

== Campus ==
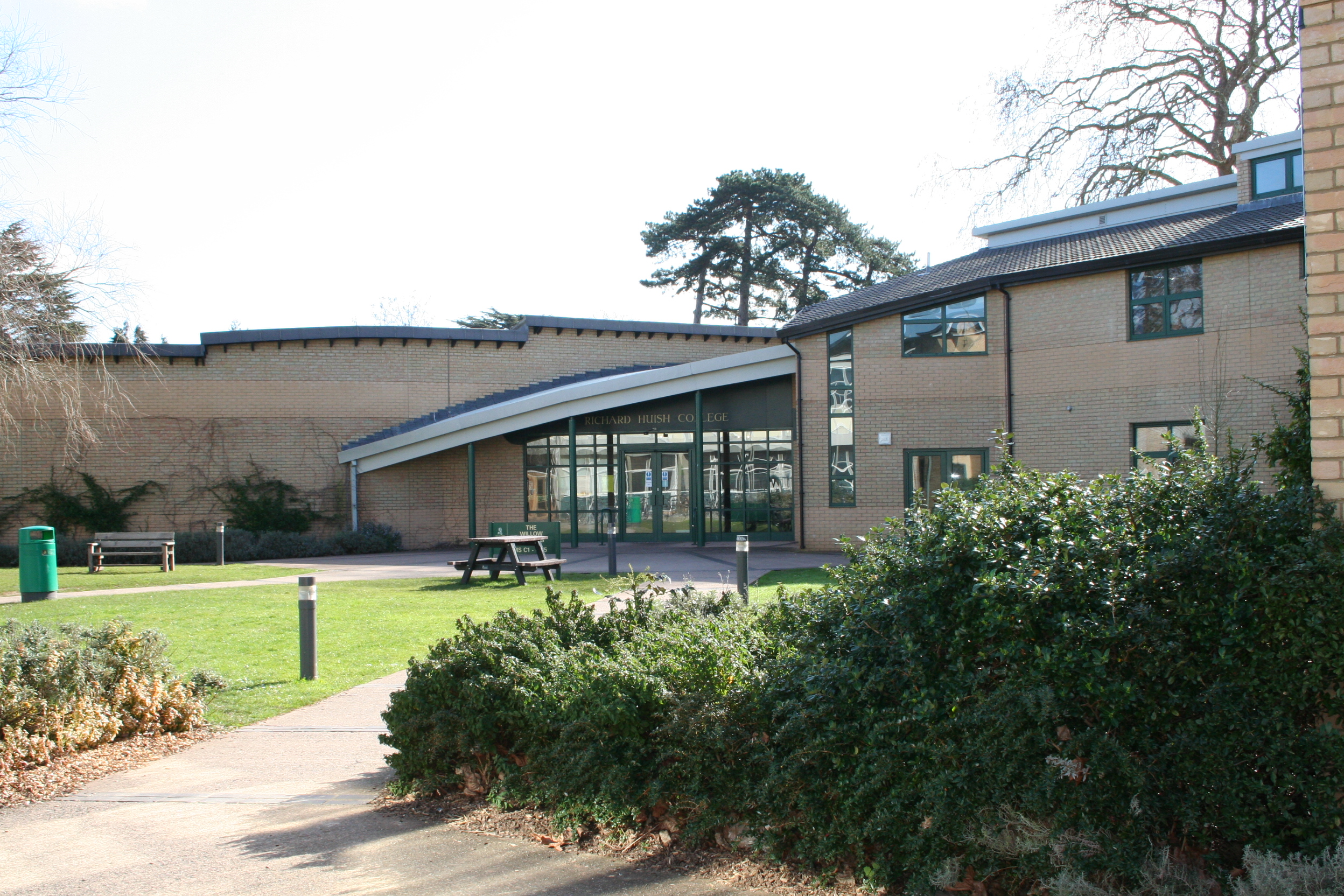
Willow building

The college occupies a site of 8 hectares (20 acres), of which 70% is sports fields, in the south of Taunton. Its buildings, which range in age from 1880 to 2015, take their names from some of the trees that cover the campus. The site is alleged to have previously been an Arboretum.

Over the period 2000–2009, a variety of building projects resulted in;

- Willow, housing the Willow Café (serving both hot and cold drinks and food options alongside a smaller seating area than the Redwood Kitchen), spaces for History, Law, A Level Business, Economics, Modern Foreign Languages and Psychology.

A renovation in 2025 upgraded the IT help desk area, moving it from Beech to the downstairs area of Willow.

- Hawthorn, housing Student Services (otherwise known as H1), Public Services, English and Sports Studies
- Linden, providing a space for tutorials
- Rowan House, housing the offices of various teachers and support staff

In 2003, the Learning Centre, situated in the heart of the campus, which is named after the science-fiction writer Arthur C. Clarke, a former pupil of Huish's Grammar School, was extended and completely refurbished.

The Learning Centre now contains several study areas including places for both static computers and laptops, a library containing books and DVD's on several different topics, areas for reading and quiet study, a dedicated classroom and a closed off "silent zone" for either quiet study or lessons as required. Various pieces of equipment are also available for "loan", including cameras, laptops and textbooks.

In 2006 the sports dome was opened, which at the time was a ground breaking project for an inflatable dome for sports. Plans were formed to replace this during 2016 with a state of the art sports facility including a viewing area, gym, changing areas and a classroom for sports students. The project was completed in January 2017 and was named the Sycamore Sports Hall.

In 2010, the Juniper Building was opened, providing facilities for students of Photography, Media and Film Studies, Music and Business.

In March 2012, the Cedar Building opened, with a further extension finishing in October of that same year. This building houses classrooms for Childcare and Education, Health and Social Care and Mathematics.

During 2015, a new café area and social space was built, including the first floor Redwood Suite, a multi-use area for dedicated study, lessons, small talks and training sessions. The café area includes a Costa Coffee, the "Huish Kitchen" - offering both hot and cold food options - and a vending machine for drinks. The Redwood Centre was also renovated to house the drama and dance studios.

In September 2020 the Redwood Building was further remodelled, including a remodel of the reception area to help secure the campus with an "airlock" style entrance. The main hall in the building was also renovated to create a theatre, providing both a space for lectures/guest speakers and a performance venue for students complete with stage lighting in order to give Music and Performing Arts students a professional place to rehearse and to showcase their pieces to an audience.

2017 saw the opening of several buildings, one of which is Oak House, providing accommodation to boarding students. Another is the Maple Building, which provides a dedicated space for students of the Arts, ICT, Computing and Graphics at a cost of £3 million.

In December 2018, the Aspen Music Centre was officially opened, providing a state of the art space for Music students. This space includes two recording studios with RedNet Technology, two sound proof live rooms for recording, a Mac suite, an editing and production suite, two specialised classrooms, five practice rooms for instrument lessons, secure instrument storage and a vast library of printed music, equipment and instruments available to loan from the college. In total, the building costed £1.4 million.

In January 2021, the college acquired the Ash Meadows rugby pitch, which is used primarily to teach rugby and to provide a home ground for the college rugby team, the Huish Tigers Rugby Club. This rugby club joins the Huish Tigers family alongside the Huish Tigers Basketball and Rugby Clubs.

Other buildings include;

- Beech, housing classrooms for Philosophy, Religion and Ethics, Classical Civilisation, Politics, Environmental Science, Geology, Geography and Science Laboratories
- Elmfield House, providing a base for the various support staff of the college including Exams, Finances, Human Resources, International, Marketing and the Estate team

== Curriculum ==
The college offers A Level and BTEC subjects. There are more than 45 subjects offered at A Level (Level 3). As well as traditional school subjects, many other A Level subjects are offered such as archaeology, classical civilisation, dance, economics, environmental studies, geology, government and politics, law, photography, psychology, sociology and statistics.

A range of BTEC courses (Level 3 vocational courses equivalent to A Levels) are offered. They include applied science, business, creative media production, graphic design, health and social care/health sciences, information technology, music production, popular music and sport. A small number of GCSEs are offered for those wanting to progress to the sixth form.

== Sport ==
Richard Huish College has access to several different sporting facilities, including the Ash Meadows rugby pitch, the playing field and the Sycamore Sports Hall, which comes with an indoor sports hall and a gym which can be accessed through a payment to the college. The college is the home of Huish Tigers basketball teams and academy.

Huish Sport runs a sports enrichment programme. Each year, over 500 students participate in Huish Sport across 19 different sports.

Richard Huish College currently provides several ways to represent the college through sport, including both team and individual sports. The sports included in this are Basketball, Cricket, Cross Country/Athletics, Equestrian, Football, Hockey (for students who own their own horse), Netball, Racquet Sports, Rugby and Volleyball. Many of these teams regularly compete both regionally and on a national level.

There is also the 'Active Huish' scheme which encourages students to take part in sports they previously would not have considered and also provides a more relaxed atmosphere in which to exercise. There are several sports on offer, such as Yoga, Table Tennis, Boccia, 3v3 Basketball, Badminton and Volleyball, alongside the chance to take part in Self Defence courses.

== Exam results ==
The college's A2-Level exam results are as follows:

- 2003/2004 - 99.3% pass rate
- 2004/2005 - 99.7% pass rate: A-B: 71%
- 2005/2006 - 99.8%+ pass rate: A-B: 75%
- 2006/2007 - 99.2%+ pass rate: A-B: 74%
- 2007/2008 - 99%+ pass rate: A-B: 55%
- 2008/2009 - 99%+ pass rate: A-B: 69%
- 2009/2010 - 99.3% pass rate: A-B: 55.9%
- 2010/2011 - 99.4% pass rate: A-B: 58.8%
- 2011/2012 - 99.1% pass rate: A-B: 56.5%
- 2012/2013 - 99.1% pass rate: A-B: 55.2%
- 2013/2014 - 98.7% pass rate: A-B: 55%
- 2014/2015 - 99% pass rate: A-B: 57%

== Notable students ==
- Gareth Andrew, cricketer currently playing for Oxfordshire, former player of Worcestershire, Somerset and Hampshire Cricket Clubs
- Andrew Castle, former British number one tennis player and television presenter
- Matt Chorley, journalist and broadcaster.
- Arthur C. Clarke, author and inventor
- Stephen Daldry, film and theatre director. His films include Billy Elliot (2000), The Hours (2002), The Reader (2008) and Extremely Loud & Incredibly Close (2011)
- Mike Downey, film producer
- Neil Edwards, former Somerset and Nottinghamshire cricketer
- Tim Emmett, adventure climber, and one of the world's leading ice climbers.
- Carl Gazzard, former County Cricketer for Somerset
- William Gibson, professor of ecclesiastical history at Oxford Brookes University
- Rebecca Huxtable, producer and co-presenter of The Scott Mills Show on BBC Radio 1
- Jack Leach, England international cricketer currently playing for Somerset County Cricket Club
- Hannah McKeand, polar explorer who set the record for the fastest journey to the South Pole in 2006
- Keith Parsons, cricketer
- Michael Parsons, former player of Somerset County Cricket Club
- Adam Pengilly, British skeleton racer
- Andy Robinson, former head coach of the England national rugby union team
- Edward S. Shire, physicist who co-invented the radar proximity fuse, also worked with John Cockcroft and Ernest Rutherford
- Sam Spurway, former cricketer
- Paul Williams, Church of England bishop
- Linda Woodhead, professor and academic specialist in religious studies at Lancaster University
- Robert Woodman, cricketer currently playing for Devon County Cricket Club
