= Jazwyn Cowan =

American professional basketball player

No. 4 – Instituto
- Position: Forward
- League: LNB

Personal information
- Born: November 11, 1983 (age 43) Baltimore, Maryland
- Listed height: 6 ft 8 in (2.03 m)
- Listed weight: 235 lb (107 kg)

Career information
- High school: McDonogh School (Owings Mills, Maryland)
- College: George Washington (2002–2005); Hampton (2005–2006)
- NBA draft: 2006: undrafted
- Playing career: 2006–present

Career history
- 2006: Nebraska Cranes
- 2006–2007: Chester Jets
- 2008–2009: Quilmes de Mar del Plata
- 2010: Trigueros de Ciudad Obregón
- 2010–2011: Unión Progresista
- 2011–2012: 9 de Julio de Río Tercero
- 2012–2014: Austin Toros
- 2014–2015: San Lorenzo de Almagro

Career highlights
- British Basketball League Top scorer (2007)

Jazwyn Michael Cowan (born November 11, 1983) is an American professional basketball player who currently plays for San Lorenzo de Almagro of the Torneo Nacional de Ascenso (TNA) in Argentina. Born in Baltimore, Maryland, he played college basketball at both George Washington University and Hampton University. He is a 6 ft 8 in (2.03 m) forward.

In April 2006, he signed with the Nebraska Cranes. Later that year, he joined the Chester Jets for the 2006–07 season. He has since played in Brazil, Argentina, Dominican Republic, and Mexico.

On October 31, 2013, Cowan was acquired by the Austin Toros of the NBA Development League.

In September 2014, Cowan signed with San Lorenzo de Almagro of Argentina for the 2014–15 season.

In 2015, Signs with Instituto de Cordoba for the LNB
