= Cypheus Bunton =

American basketball player and coach (born 1972)

Cypheus Bunton (born February 11, 1972) is an American former professional basketball player and former assistant basketball coach at the University of South Carolina. He is currently an assistant basketball coach at Spring Valley High School in Columbia, South Carolina. He was born February 11, 1972, in Louisville, Kentucky.

== High school career ==
A 6'7" forward, Bunton played high school basketball for Valley High School in Louisville, Kentucky, and he earned All-State and All-Conference accolades in his senior year.

== College career ==
=== Sullivan Junior College ===
Bunton played two years at Sullivan Junior College in Louisville. He averaged 10.0 points and 7.8 rebounds per game as a freshman, contributing to a 24–8 overall record. As a sophomore, he averaged 12.1 points, 8.2 rebounds, and 3.0 blocked shots per game, leading the team to a 31–6 overall record. He helped the Executives to back-to-back Kentucky Junior College Athletic Conference championships.

=== Western Kentucky ===
Bunton played his last two years of college at Western Kentucky University and was a teammate of Darnell Mee. As a junior, Bunton averaged 7.5 points, 5.3 rebounds, and 1.0 blocked shots in only 21.5 minutes per game. As a he senior, averaged 10.4 points, 6.6 rebounds, and 1.7 blocked shots. He also led the team in rebounding and ranked third in scoring his senior year.

== Professional career ==
=== Finland ===
Bunton played for Fossan Alku, in Finland for the 1995–96 season. His regular season average in blocks (3,86) is still # 1.

=== Sweden ===
Bunton played for M7 Basket in Sweden from 1996 to 1998, averaging 15.4 points and 8.2 rebounds per game in the 1997–98 season. He then played for Sundsvall in Sweden for the 1998–99 season, averaging 15.8 points and 8.1 rebounds.

=== England ===
Bunton played the 1999–00 season with the Derby Storm in England. In 35 games he averaged 15.1 points, 6.9 rebounds, 3.5 assists, 2.6 steals and he led the league with 3.4 blocks per game.
