= Huish Tigers =

- League: Somerset Basketball League
- Established: 1992; 34 years ago
- History: Taunton Tigers; 1992-2012; Huish Tigers; 2013-Present
- Arena: Richard Huish College
- Capacity: 100
- Location: Taunton, Somerset
- Team colours: Black and Orange
- Head coach: Gary Carter
- Website: Official Website

The Huish Tigers (sometimes known as Huish Taunton Tigers) are a semi–professional basketball team based in Taunton, Somerset competing in the Somerset Basketball League. The team plays all their home games at the Sycamore Sports Hall at Richard Huish College.

Until the end of 2012, the team was known as the Taunton Tigers and competed in the National Basketball League (NBL) Division Three South. Formerly a Division One side, the Tigers were forced to drop down the divisions after going into debt. In 2013, they became the Huish Tigers and are now coached by Gary Carter.

== History ==
=== Taunton Tigers ===
The origins of a basketball team in Taunton stem back to the late 1980s. In 1990, the team were called Taunton Community Basketball Club competing in South West Division Two. Ronnie Heath joined as a player and coach and by 1992 the team had rebranded as Taunton Tigers.

During the 1990s, the team progressed up through the local leagues coached by Ian Hunt before competing in the National Basketball League. Taunton Tigers were founder-members of the new NBL Division Three in 1997. Finishing in a respectable fifth place they were promoted to Division Two, as the higher divisions were expanding. The move proved fully justified, as they finished runners-up in 1999 and won the playoffs moving the team straight into Division One.

Regrettably, the conclusion of the 2000-01 season saw a league reorganisation, and despite finishing eighth, they were relegated to NBL Division Two. With Division One now divided into the Conference and NBL 1, this effectively became the fourth tier.

Although they finished third in NBL 2 South in 2002, the constant changes in division had stretched their resources, and they chose to withdraw from the league to guarantee their survival for another opportunity to play in the national league.

Rejoining the national league Division Three West in 2004-05 saw the team perform well, earning them third place overall. Under coach Ronnie Heath, they won back to back promotions in 2005–06 and 2006–07 to propel them from NBL Division Three, to NBL Division One. The club finished eighth in the league in their maiden season, avoiding relegation.

The following 2008-09 season brought disappointment, just two wins were recorded in the league, and they finished bottom, missing out on the post-season. Despite this, they remained in the top division for the following 2009-10 season which was expanded to twelve teams. The team won twelve league matches and seventeen overall, and enjoyed their greatest success in Division One.

At the club's annual general meeting in 2010, it was revealed that the club was heavily in debt. The club's committee resigned, and combined with a number of key players announcing their retirement, the club were forced to withdraw from Division One. England Basketball would not let the club drop to Division Two, and instead the club had to move to Division Four.

In 2010-11, the team won their first season in Division Four South West, recording seven wins in the league and thirteen overall, and competed in Division Three South in the 2011–12 season, but came seventh.

From 2010-17, the Taunton Tigers Basketball Charity (1137558) helped fund team activities and associated community projects. When this was disbanded, all funds were transferred to the Somerset Activity and Sports Partnership (SASP).

=== Huish Tigers ===
In 2013, the Taunton Tigers became the Huish Tigers being based at the Richard Huish College following a long partnership together.

In 2017-18 and 2018-19, the team were runners up in the National Basketball League Division Four South West. In 2019-20 the team played in the NBL Division Three South West coming fourth overall. Unfortunately due to the COVID-19 pandemic the remaining 2020-21 season was cancelled.

Since 2021, the team has competed in the Somerset Basketball League (SBL). In 2021-22 and 2024-25 Huish Tigers were the SBL league and playoff champions, runners up in the 2022-23 playoffs and third place in the 2023-24 league.

== Season-by-season records ==
Season	Division	Tier	Pos.	Played	Won	Lost	Points	Playoffs	National Cup	National Trophy	Patrons Cup	National Shield
Taunton Tigers
1997-98	NBL 3	4	5th	26	11	15	22	Semi-Final	-	-	-	-
1998-99	NBL 2	3	2nd	26	21	5	42	Winners	-	3rd Round	-	-
1999-2000	NBL 1	2	8th	24	9	15	18	Quarter-Final	-	3rd Round	-	-
2000-01	NBL 2	4	7th	24	12	12	24	Quarter-Final	-	-	-	Semi-Final
2001-02	NBL 2 South	4	3rd	16	10	6	20	Quarter-Final	-	-	-	Quarter-Final
2002-03	Team withdrew from National Basketball League Competitions											
2003-04	Team withdrew from National Basketball League Competitions											
2004-05	NBL 3 West	4	3rd	16	11	5	22	Quarter-Final	2nd Round	-	-	Semi-Final
2005-06	NBL 3 SW	4	2nd	16	13	3	26	Semi-Final	3rd Round	-	2nd Place	Semi-Final
2006-07	NBL 2	3	3rd	22	15	7	30	Finalist	3rd Round	-	2nd Place	-
2007-08	NBL 1	2	8th	18	5	13	10	Quarter-Final	3rd Round	-	-	-
2008-09	NBL 1	2	10th	20	2	16	4	-	3rd Round	-	-	-
2009-10	NBL 1	2	8th	22	12	10	24	Quarter-Final	3rd Round	Quarter-Final	-	-
2010-11	NBL 4 SW	5	1st	9	7	2	14	Quarter-Final	2nd Round	-	-	-
2011-12	NBL 3 South	4	7th	20	9	11	18	Quarter-Final	1st Round	-	-	-
Huish Tigers
2017-18	NBL 4 SW	5	2nd	20	17	3	34	Quarter-Final	1st Round	-	-	-
2018-19	NBL 4 SW	5	2nd	14	9	5	18	Quarter-Final	1st Round	-	-	-
2019-20	NBL 3 SW	4	4th	17	11	6	23	-	2nd Round	-	-	-
2020-21	NBL 3 SW	4	Season cancelled due to COVID-19 pandemic									
2021-22	SBL	-	1st	10	9	1	28	Winners	-	-	-	-
2022-23	SBL	-	4th	13	8	5	29	Finalist	-	-	-	-
2023-24	SBL	-	3rd	12	9	3	30	Semi-Final	-	-	-	-
2024-25	SBL	-	1st	14	13	1	40	Winners	-	-	-	-
2025-26	SBL	-	2nd	12	10	2	31	Semi-Final	-	-	-	-

Notes:

- From 2000-2003 the NBL Conference operated as the second tier league, ahead of Division One.
- In 2003 the NBL was replaced by the EBL, which reinstated Division One as the second tier.

== Home venues ==
Taunton Tigers played at multiple venues across Taunton mostly due to having multiple teams and not owning their own venue:

- Blackbrook Leisure Centre
- Somerset College of Arts and Technology
- Wellsprings Leisure Centre

Taunton Tigers moved into the newly opened Wellsprings Leisure Centre in 2004 and made it their home venue until 2012.

- Richard Huish College

Taunton Tigers utilised Richard Huish College for some matches moving into the college's inflatable sports dome in August 2006. In 2013, they were succeeded by Huish Tigers, who now play in the Sycamore sports hall which opened in January 2017 replacing the sports dome.

== Honours ==
=== League ===
- WEBBA Division One Winners: 1994/95 & 1995/96
- NBL Division Two Runners Up: 1998/99
- EBL Division Three South West Runners Up: 2005/06
- EBL Division Four South West Winners: 2010/11
- EBL Division Four South West Runners Up: 2017/18 & 2019/20
- SBL Champions: 2021/22 & 2024/25

=== Playoffs ===
- NBL Division Two Playoff Winners: 1998/99
- EBL Division Two Playoff Finalists: 2006/07
- SBL Playoff Champions: 2021/22 & 2024/25
- SBL Playoff Finalists: 2022/23

=== Cups ===
- West of England Men's Cup: 1995/96, 1996/97, 1999/2000 & 2000/01
- Patrons Cup 2nd Place: 2005/06 & 2006/07
