= Terrell Myers =

American basketball player

Personal information
- Born: August 28, 1974 (age 52) New Haven, Connecticut, U.S.
- Listed height: 6 ft 3 in (1.91 m)
- Listed weight: 190 lb (86 kg)

Career information
- High school: Hillhouse (New Haven, Connecticut); St. Thomas More (Oakdale, Connecticut)
- College: Saint Joseph's (1993–1997)
- NBA draft: 1997: undrafted
- Playing career: 1997–2007
- Position: Point guard
- Number: 11
- Coaching career: 2009–present

Career history

Playing
- 1997–2001: Sheffield Sharks
- 2001–2003: London Towers
- 2003–2006: Girona
- 2006–2007: Murcia

Coaching
- 2009–present: St. Andrew's School

Career highlights
- BBL MVP (1999); 3× BBL All-Star (1999–2001); 2× BBL First Team (1999, 2000); BBL Second Team (2001); Third-team All-Atlantic 10 (1997)

Terrell Myers (born August 28, 1974) is an American former professional basketball player who also later became a naturalised citizen of the United Kingdom.

== Playing career ==
=== High school and college ===
Terrell attended Hillhouse High School, then attended St. Thomas More School in Oakdale, Connecticut for a postgraduate year. In college, Myers played for Saint Joseph's University in Philadelphia, Pennsylvania, where he studied and played basketball from 1993 to 1997.

=== Professional ===
After graduating, Myers moved to England, signing professionally for the British Basketball League team Sheffield Sharks. He played with them for four seasons and the BBL Trophy in 1998, the League Championship in 1999 and the BBL Cup in 2000. He was named the BBL Most Valuable Player in 1998–99 when he averaged 23.5 points per game; the BBL Cup MVP that same season; and was a BBL All-Star team for three consecutive seasons (1999–2001).

In 2001, Terrell moved to the BBL's London Towers and, in 2003, to the Spanish lower-league team Casademont Girona. After two seasons, Myers moved to the Asociación de Clubs de Baloncesto to play for Akasvayu Girona in one of Europe's biggest leagues, after which he moved to CB Murcia.

== Coaching career ==
In 2009, Myers became the head boys' varsity basketball coach at St. Andrew's School in Middletown, Delaware, where he remains as of the 2023–24 season.
