= Yorick Williams =

British professional basketball player (born 1975)

Yorick Mortimer Williams (born 29 July 1975 in Manchester, England) is a British professional basketball player, and is currently playing for the Manchester Giants in the British Basketball League. He had a two season stint as player coach for the Giants from 2015-2017.

Williams was one of the most prolific players from British hoops scene, having played over 5600 minutes in the BBL, and scoring over 6200 points for six different teams. The 6ft5 Guard has represented his country with both the England national team and the Great Britain team in his career.

== Biography ==
=== Playing for the Giants ===
His career started with his hometown team, the Manchester Giants when he was signed professionally in 1994 from their junior teams, making his senior debut against the Greater London Leopards on 25 September 1994. In his first season (1994-95), he helped his team reach the final of the BBL Championship Play-off's and also won the Slam Dunk contest in 1995.

Yorick stayed with the Giants for two more seasons before signing for Derby Storm in 1998. Although only staying with Storm for the 1998-99 season, Williams averaged 17.33 PPG in 24 appearances. In 1999, he signed for the Birmingham Bullets, the first of two spells with the Midlanders. The Guard's impressive form continued over two seasons and in 2001, he earned a lucrative move to Aris Thessaloniki in the prestigious Greek A1 Ethniki league.

=== Back to England ===
However, after just one season in the Mediterranean, Williams returned to England and signed for the Essex Leopards, the same franchise he made his BBL debut against in 1994.

While Yorick had an impressive career up to this point, there was a severe lack of honours won, and he was desperate for success. The Leopards were one of the best teams to grace the league in the 1990s, but following the end of his first season (2002-03) when he averaged 15.22 PPG, the Leopards franchise withdrew from the league and yet again the journeyman was forced to find another club.

=== Overdue success ===
Brighton Bears came calling and Williams signed for the South-coaster's in what would be his most successful spell to date. The 2003-04 season saw Brighton, with the help of Yorick's average of 14.16 PPG, dominate the domestic scene, winning the BBL Championship and finishing runners-up in the BBL Trophy, losing by 2 points (66-68) against the Chester Jets. This season also saw the Bears compete in the ULEB Cup, and for Yorrick a return to playing basketball against European opposition. Brighton took 3rd place in Group F, with a 4-6 record.

The 2004-05 season saw Brighton again finish runner-up in the BBL Trophy, and although they could not retain their Championship crown, they did find triumph in the BBL Cup, beating the Scottish Rocks 90-74. For Yorrick it was a season of mixed emotions as the triumph's were tarnished by injury that restricted him to just 19 games, averaging 17.26 PPG.

=== A season to remember ===
The summer of 2005 brought wholesale changes at Brighton, and after only two games into the 2005-06 season, Williams was transferred back to the Birmingham Bullets. In 29 games for the struggling Bullets, rooted to the foot of the table for the season's duration, Williams posted a career high 23.90 points-per-game, the highest in the league. Birmingham's financial pressures were too much to handle however, and the franchise went into liquidation in 2006. For the 2006-07 season, Williams signed with East Midlander's the Leicester Riders, but after a dire season blighted by off-court difficulties, including unpaid wages, Williams departed the troubled club and headed south to sign for the Milton Keynes Lions for the 2007–08 season.

== Career history ==
- present (United Kingdom) Manchester Giants
- 2014–2015 (United Kingdom) Leicester Riders
- 2013–14 (United Kingdom) Manchester Giants
- 2011–13 (United Kingdom) Leicester Riders
- 2007–11 (United Kingdom) Milton Keynes Lions
- 2006–07 (United Kingdom) Leicester Riders
- 2005–06 (United Kingdom) Birmingham Bullets
- 2003–05 (United Kingdom) Brighton Bears
- 2002–03 (United Kingdom) Essex Leopards
- 2001–02 (Greece) Aris Thessaloniki
- 1999–01 (United Kingdom) Birmingham Bullets
- 1998–99 (United Kingdom) Derby Storm
- 1994–98 (United Kingdom) Manchester Giants
