= Shawn Jamison =

American basketball player (born 1969)

Personal information
- Born: October 9, 1969 (age 57) Los Angeles County, California, U.S.
- Listed height: 203 cm (6 ft 8 in)
- Listed weight: 109 kg (240 lb)

Career information
- High school: Richard Gahr (Cerritos, California)
- College: San Diego State (1989–1990); UTSA (1991–1992)
- Playing career: 1992–2008
- Position: Power forward / center
- Number: 6
- Coaching career: 2008–present

Career history

Playing
- 1993: Snæfell
- 1998–1999: Cheongju SK Knights
- 1999–2000: Birmingham Bullets
- 2000–2001: Geneve Devils
- 2001–2002: Thames Valley Tigers
- 2003–2008: Milton Keynes Lions

Coaching
- 2008–2009: Loughborough University
- 2009–2010: Walsall Wizards
- 2011–2016: Newcastle-under-Lyme
- 2016–present: Stoke-on-Trent

Career highlights
- BBL Cup (2008); Icelandic All-Star (1993)

Shawn Demetrius Jamison (born October 9, 1969) is a basketball coach and former professional player, who last played in England for the Milton Keynes Lions.

The 6 foot, 8 inch centre's former teams include the world famous Harlem Globetrotters (1995–96), Geneve Devils (2000–01) and Thames Valley Tigers (2001–02).

== College career ==
Jamison played college basketball for San Diego State from 1989 to 1990 where he averaged 16.8 points in 31 games. He finished his college career with the University of Texas at San Antonio in 1991–1992, averaging 10.4 points in 28 games.

== Professional career ==
In January 1993, Jamison signed with Snæfell of the Icelandic Úrvalsdeild karla, replacing Damon Lopez. On February 6, 1993, he scored 29 points in Snæfell's 76–115 loss to Keflavík in the Icelandic Cup finals. He was selected for the Icelandic All-Star game on February 13, On February 21, Jamison scored 50 points in a 98–105 victory against Breiðablik.

On February 24, Jamison along with Keflavík's Kristinn Friðriksson were ejected in the second quarter of Snæfell's 82–107 loss for fighting. On March 2, the Icelandic Basketball Federation disciplinary board suspended him for 2 games for his part in the fight. On March 16, he scored 25 points in Snæfell's 66–77 loss to KR in the last game of the regular season. The loss meant that Snæfell missed out on the playoffs. For the season, Jamison averaged 26.8 points and 11.1 rebounds per game.

In 1995, Jamison signed with the Los Angeles Clippers. He was waived on October 31.

He spent the 1998–1999 season with the Cheongju SK Knights of the Korean Basketball League where he averaged 22.7 points and 9.0 rebounds in 42 games.

== Coaching career ==
Jamison began his first head coaching position with the Loughborough Cougars women's first team at Loughborough University in 2008, and after leading the Cougars to a 7th-place finish in the BUCS Championships Jamison went on to Coach the Walsall Wizards. In 2009 Jamison started a company called Hoopskills which brings professional and quality coaching in communities and schools.
