= Clive Allen (basketball) =

British basketball coach and player (born 1961)

Current position
- Team: City of Birmingham Rockets Women's Coach

Biographical details
- Born: 23 August 1961 (age 65); Dudley, England
- Education: Staffordshire University; Northwest Nazarene University

Playing career
- 1984–85: Sandwell
- 1985–87, 1988–2001: Birmingham Bullets
- 2001–02: Dudley Bears
- Position: Forward/Centre

Coaching career (HC unless noted)
- 2005–07: Milton Keynes Lions (assistant coach)
- 2007–08: Birmingham Panthers (general manager)

Clive Allen (born 23 August 1961) is a British basketball coach and former player, best known for playing for the Birmingham Bullets. After retirement, he worked on the coaching staff of BBL teams the Milton Keynes Lions and the Birmingham Panthers. He was also an England international, and is the father of women's basketball player Dominique Allen.

== Career ==
During his playing career, he played for teams including the Birmingham Bullets of the British Basketball League (BBL) and the Dudley Bears. He was best known for his work with the Bullets, being described after his career as a "legend" from that club, and twice made it to the play-offs with the team. Allen was also an international, playing for the England men's national basketball team on five occasions.

Along with Tony Simms, he coached the Aston Athletics basketball team in 2005 and shortly afterwards was assistant coach at the Milton Keynes Lions under Nigel Lloyd. He was general manager for the Birmingham Panthers, again under Lloyd, during their only season during 2007–08. Following the club's closure, he was in discussion with association football club West Bromwich Albion to form a new club for the BBL, and to bring back the Birmingham Bullets. In 2009 he became Sporting Club Albion's (part of West Bromwich Albion F.C.) basketball coordinator, and later became Head Basketball Development Coach for the Metropolitan Borough of Dudley.

In 2024, Allen was brought in as the head coach of the City of Birmingham Rockets women's team.

== Personal life ==
Allen is the father of Dominique Allen, who plays for the Oral Roberts Golden Eagles women's basketball team. She has been chosen for the British team at the 2012 Summer Olympics.
