= Jeff Bonds =

American professional basketball player

Personal information
- Born: May 14, 1982 (age 44) Los Angeles, California, U.S.
- Listed height: 1.99 m (6 ft 6 in)

Career information
- College: Cal Poly Pomona (2001–2005)
- Playing career: 2005–present
- Position: Small forward

Career history
- 2005–2006: Birmingham Bullets
- 2006–2007: Sheffield Sharks
- 2007–2008: Bàsquet Muro
- 2008–2009: Gijón Baloncesto
- 2009–2010: Bàsquet Mallorca
- 2010–2011: CB Peñas Huesca
- 2011–2012: CB Clavijo
- 2012–2013: Gießen 46ers

Jeff Bonds (born May 14, 1982, in Los Angeles, California, U.S.) is an American professional basketball player, currently plays in the LEB Gold, for the Lobe Huesca. He previously played for Bàsquet Muro and Viopisa Gijón at the Silver level of the Liga Española de Baloncesto, in the British Basketball League for the Birmingham Bullets and the Sheffield Sharks and later in Bàsquet Mallorca in LEB Gold.

Nicknamed "Premium", the 6'-7" Forward attended the California State Polytechnic University, Pomona from 2001 to 2005, where he was named as an NABC All-American in the 2004–2005 season, before signing professionally with Birmingham Bullets in 2005. During his debut season in British basketball, Bonds averaged 17.09 points-per-game and 6.79 rebounds-per-game. Following the demise and closure of the Bullets franchise in 2006, Bonds moved north to sign for the Sharks.

He was named as the BBL Player of the Month for January 2007 and later that season went on to win the BBL Co-MVP with Guilford Heat star Brian Dux.
