= Josh Crutchley =

British basketball player (born 1987)

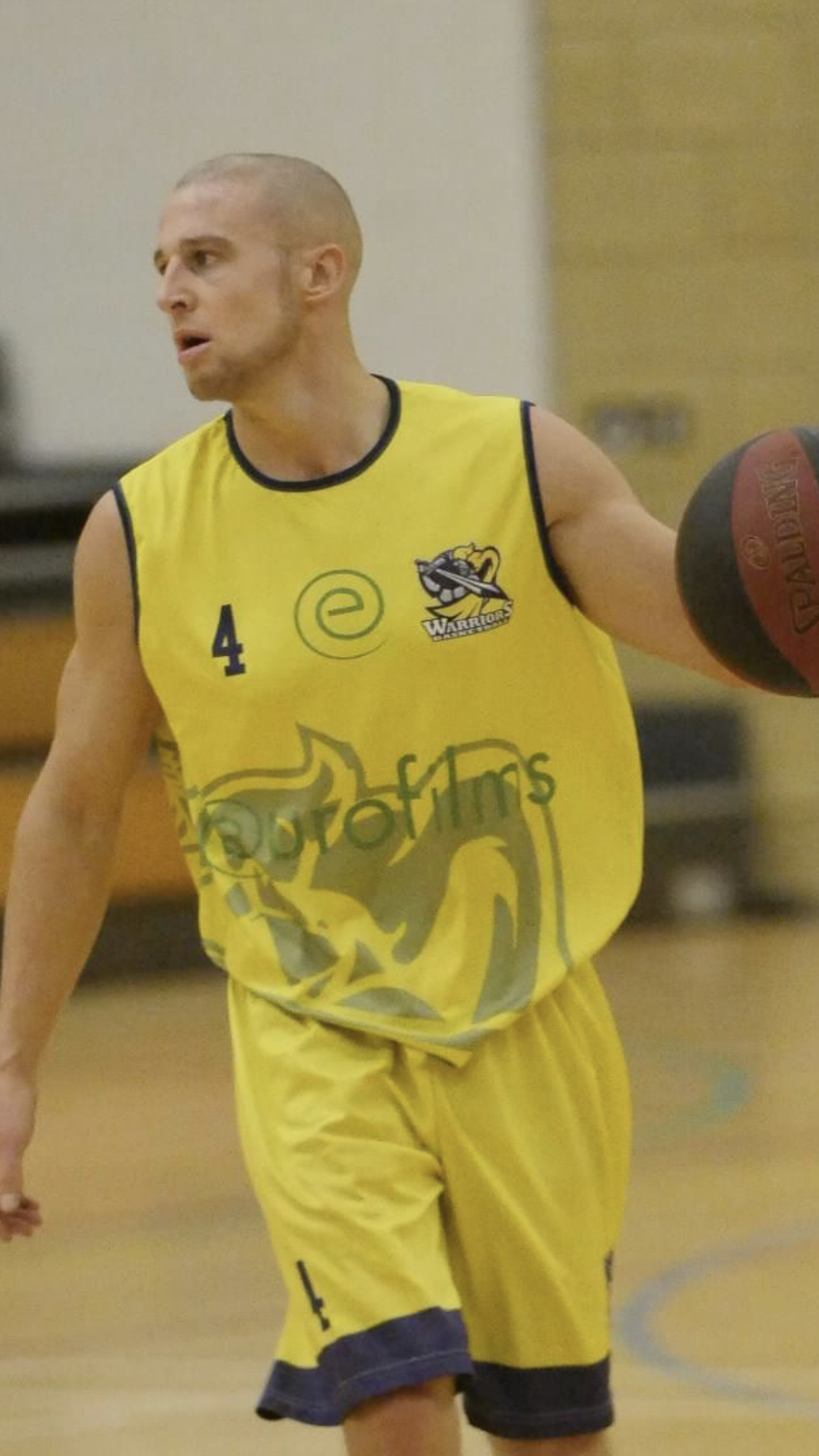
- Shropshire Warriors game Josh Crutchley

No. 4 – WARRIORS
- Position: Guard
- League: BBL

Personal information
- Born: 4 June 1987 (age 39) Shrewsbury, England
- Listed height: 5 ft 8 in (1.73 m)

Career information
- College: TCAT
- Playing career: 2007–present

Career history
- 20: 1999–present – Shropshire Warriors, 2003–2006 TCAT Sports Academy 2006/07/08 – Birmingham Panthers

Career highlights
- 3 mvps, 4 team spirits

Josh Crutchley (born 4 June 1987) is a British Basketball coach for the Shrewsbury School and a former professional Basketball player, currently plays for the Shropshire Warriors, an amateur club competing in the National Basketball League (NBL). Growing up in Telford, Crutchley Attended Telford College of Arts and Technology (TCAT) where he made his debut in 2007 into the BBL.

The 5-foot-8-inch (1.73) guard played in the BBL for the Birmingham Panthers during the 2007/08 season.

== Biography ==
Josh Crutchley started the game of basketball at the age of 11 whilst at Charlton School. Once scouted by Shropshire Warriors' franchise owner, he was then appointed to play for the Shropshire Warriors basketball club under 14's and earned himself a place on the senior men's squad at the age of 14. In 2007, Crutchley signed for the Birmingham Panthers. At the end of the season, the Birmingham Panthers finished last in the league, and the team was disbanded.

Since then, he plays for the Shropshire Warriors, starting in the fourth division of the English Basketball League, and promoting to the third division after winning the division title in the 2009/10 season.

== Achievements ==
Josh Crutchley's achievements include:

- League Champions during his junior season 2000 with Shropshire Warriors.
- County College champions three years running 2003-2006
- College Cup winners winning 2004/6
- TCATS Student and Basketball Player of the Year 2006
- 3 MVP awards with the Shropshire Warriors as well as 4 Most Improved and 2 Team Spirit
