= SPACe Centre =

Leisure centre in England

Coordinates: 51.5304°N 0.0784°W

The Hackney SPACe Sports Centre ("Sport and Performing Arts Centre") is a leisure centre in Hoxton in London Borough of Hackney, England. It is part of Hackney Community College and was opened in February 2001 following grants from Sport England with the intention that it would become the venue for Centres of Excellence in basketball, netball and cricket.

The centre's main hall (dedicated to Malcolm Williams, whose work and vision were instrumental in getting SPACe built) can accommodate a range of indoor sports, and was the home venue in 2006/07 for the professional basketball team London United, who moved there from Brunel University in 2006.

SPACe is also home to Hackney Community College Basketball Academy and Cricket Academy programmes. It is also home to many basketball teams that play in the London Metropolitan Basketball League (LMBL), the largest regional basketball league in the UK. SPACe has a gym and weights facility housing Olympic free weights and CV equipment as well as three dance studios. One of these has been named after Margaret Shepherd, who taught performing arts at the nearby Hoxton Hall.

The main hall has tiered seating for around 600 people. SPACe is managed by Lee Perkins who was instrumental in the sporting development of the centre.
