= Joel Burns (basketball) =

American professional basketball player

Joel Burns (born February 27, 1975) is a retired American-British professional basketball player.

== Career ==
The 6'2" guard from Wisconsin attended Western Michigan University, scoring a total of 1225 points over his four years (1993-1997). With 181 three-point field goals made, Burns ended his NCAA career as the school’s all-time leader in this category, before being surpassed by Ben Reed in the early 2000s.

He signed for the Watford Royals in 1997. Burns, who holds also British citizenship, spent the large part of his playing career in the British Basketball League (BBL) and had a short stint with German side Braunschweig. Known as a sharp shooter, he had a runner-up finish with Derby Storm in the 1998-99 BBL Trophy competition and with the Edinburgh Rocks in the 1999-00 BBL championship.

Burns retired from professional basketball in January 2009.

== Career history ==
- 2007–2009 (United Kingdom) Leicester Riders
- 2006–2007 (United Kingdom) Sheffield Sharks
- 2006 (United Kingdom) Scottish Rocks
- 2004–2006 (United Kingdom) Leicester Riders
- 2002–2004 (United Kingdom) Milton Keynes Lions
- 2001–2002 (Germany) Braunschweig
- 2000–2001 (United Kingdom) Derby Storm
- 2000 (United Kingdom) Birmingham Bullets
- 1999–2000 (United Kingdom) Edinburgh Rocks
- 1998–1999 (United Kingdom) Derby Storm
- 1997–1998 (United Kingdom) Worthing Bears
- 1997 (United Kingdom) Watford Royals
