= Reggie Kirk =

American basketball player and entrepreneur

Reginald Dewayne “Reggie” Kirk is an American former professional basketball player, entrepreneur, basketball trainer, personal trainer, and sports official.

After playing at Vincennes University in Indiana and finishing second at the National Junior College Championship in 1986, Kirk went on to play the remainder of his collegiate career at Fort Hays State University in Hays, Kansas (1986–87 and 1987–88). Subsequently, he joined the World Basketball League (WBL)’s Youngstown Pride. In his first year, he played along with Mario Eli and won the World League Championship in 1989 with an average of 7.3 points, 2.4 rebounds and 2.0 assists in 11 minutes per game. From 1990 to 1992, Kirk played for the WBL’s Florida Jades before joining the United States Basketball League’s West Palm Beach Stingrays, with whom he averaged 15 points, 6 rebounds, 4 assists and 2 steals and shot 60% from the field. In the spring 1993, Kirk started his professional international career by playing successively in the Dominican Republic (for Juan Pablo Duarte, La Uce, Quisqueya, Consuelo and Savica), Mexico (for Durango and Juarez), England (for Birmingham Bullets and London’s Milton Kings Lion), and China.

After his retirement as a basketball player in 2002, Kirk went about his refereeing and coaching career in Atlanta, Georgia. In 2013, he created a training institution called “Better Skills Better Players”, which is developing personalized and group training programs for athletes at several levels, including middle-school, high-school, college and professional.

== Early years ==
Kirk's first sport was baseball and was a late bloomer in the game of basketball. In middle school he started playing organized basketball, but he was not in the starting Five. He grew a little each year and played as a freshman and sophomore. At the end of the season in his junior year, Kirk was playing football with his best friend who fell on his leg and fractured a bone. The accident enabled him to grow from 5’9 to 6’1. Kirk was integrated to varsity's starting line-up. He played for Hammond High School in Indiana, where he helped his team in scoring, rebounding, assisting and stealing, and he was named to the All Conference and All Indiana teams as a senior. In 1985, Kirk was not awarded a scholarship to play for Vincennes University in Indiana. He helped his team to a 36–2 record and runner-up of the National Junior College Championship in 1986. In 1986, he was awarded a scholarship to play for Fort Hays State University in Hays from 1986 to 1988. Kirk began professional play in 1989–1990 with the World Basketball League (WBL)’s Youngstown Pride, and averaged 7.3 points, 2.4 rebounds and 2.0 assists in 11 minutes per game. He went on to play with WBL’S Florida Jades in 1990 and 1991. In 1992, he joined the United States Basketball League's West Palm Beach Stingrays, with whom he averaged 15 points, 6 rebounds, 4 assists and 2 steals and shot 60% from the field.

== Professional career ==
=== Professional basketball player (1993–2002) ===
In the spring 1993, Kirk started his professional international career by playing in Asia, Europe, and Latin America. Kirk played for Juan Pablo Duarte in the Dominican Republic during the spring of 1993, where he averaged 28.5 points (shot 55% from the field and 38.5% from the three-point range), 4.1 assists and 1.3 steals per game while helping his team to the league semifinals. Kirk then played the 1993 season with Durango in the Mexican CIMEBA league, where he averaged 27.9 points (shot 65% from the field, 78.9% from the free throw line and 44.9% from the three-point range), 4.9 rebounds, 3 assists, 1.7 steals and 1.2 blocked shots in 38.3 minutes per game. Kirk ranked fourth in the league in scoring (sixth in the field goal percentage and third in the three-point percentage), sixth in steals and blocked shots, and tenth in assists. Kirk spent the spring of 1994 with Quisqueya San Pedro in the Dominican Republic, helping them to their league Championship by averaging 28.2 points, 5.5 rebounds, and 4.7 assists per game. Kirk then returned to the Durango in Mexico for the 1994–1995 season, helping them win the CIMEBA League Championship for the first time in 17 years, and averaged 27.3 points, 4.3 rebounds, 3.5 assists and 2.7 steals per game. Kirk returned to the Dominican Republic during the spring 1995 to play for the Club Baloncesto RMA in La Romana, helping them to their first ever championship in the Torneo de Baloncesto de La Romana, and he averaged 25.9 points (shot 49.3% from the field, 81.3% from the free throw line and 39.7% from the three-point range), 6.1 assists, 4.6 rebounds and 2.2 steals per game. Kirk made the All Star team and ranked third in the league in scoring, sixth in assists, first in the free throw percentage, and third in three-point field goal percentages. Kirk returned to Mexico to play in the CBP League during the Fall of 1995 with the Soles de Hermosillo. He averaged 28.3 points, 5.2 rebounds, 6.4 assists and 2.7 steals per game. Kirk spent the spring of 1996 in the Dominican Republic with Club Baloncesto RMA where he averaged 26.1 points, 5.9 assists, 5.5 rebounds and 2.1 steals per game, and he helped his team to the league championship. Once again, Kirk was among the league leaders in scoring, made the All-Star Team and was named League MVP. He then returned to Durango for the 1996 season where he helped his team to finish runner-up at the Championship, and he averaged 28.3 points, 6.2 assists, 4.8 rebounds and 2.1 steals per game, and ranking among the league's top ten performers in every statistical category.

Kirk spent the spring of 1997 with CB Consuelo in San Pedro in the Dominican Republic winning the first ever Championship in the team's history, and he averaged 28.7 points (53.9% from the field, 46.7% from the three-point range and 82.8% from free throw line), 4.3 assists, 3.8 rebounds and 1.9 steals per game.

Kirk joined the Birmingham Bullets for the 1997–1998 season and guiding his team to first place in the Budweiser League, and averaging 18.2 points (57.5% from the field, 42.9% from three-point range, 77.4% from free throw line), 7.1 rebounds and 1 steal per game. He also earned several “Player of the Month” Awards while helping his team to the English League Championship. Kirk signed with the Birmingham Bullets for the 1998–1999 season and averaged 22.8 points (shot 54.7% from the field, 34.1% from the three-point range, 72.8% from free throw line), 4.2 rebounds, 4.4 assists and 1.2 steals per game.

Kirk joined the Shanghai Dragon in China 1999–2000, and subsequently the Gallos de Pelea in Juarez-Mexico in 2000–2001 where he helped the team to reach the finals losing in the seventh game of the Championship. In 2001–2002, Kirk joined London Milton Kings Lion,, where he finished his professional career as a player with an average of 15 points, 4 assists, 4 rebounds, and 2 steals.

=== Referee ===
After his retirement as a basketball player in 2002, Kirk embraced the officiating profession, where he is currently officiating at the high school, collegiate and professional levels in Atlanta, Georgia. Since 2006, he affiliated with the Capital City Basketball Association, the Atlanta Pro AM League, and the Atlanta Basketball Officials Group.

=== Personal trainer ===
Kirk is also a personal basketball trainer. At the beginning of 2013, he created a training institution called “Better Skills Better Players”, through which he is developing personalized and group training programs for athletes at several levels, including middle school, high school, college and professional.
