= Adam Williams (basketball) =

British basketball player

Adam Williams (born 27 January 1983) is a professional basketball player currently playing in the BBL for the Everton Tigers. He played for Leicester in the 2006/07 season before playing for the Birmingham Bullets in the 2007/08 season, and switching to the Worcester Wolves in 2008/09. A brief return to the Leicester Riders in the next season lasted only five months before he left to join the Everton Tigers.
