= Gaylon Moore =

American basketball player (born 1978)

Gaylon Moore (born June 15, 1978) is an American professional basketball player, who most recently played for the Plymouth Raiders in the British Basketball League.

The 6'7" Forward born in Union City, Tennessee was a star center for Gibson County High School from 1992 to 1996 and attended Union University in Jackson, Tennessee on a basketball scholarship from 1996 to 2000. Moore spent just one season with the BBL team where he only played three games. From 2001 to 2005, Moore played with leading EBL team Worthing Thunder where he caught the attention of many bigger clubs.

Plymouth Raiders coach Gary Stronach, a long-time admirer of Moore's, was the first to step in and the EBL Player of the Year 2003 joined the Raiders in the summer of 2005. Moore was awarded Raiders' MVP award, which was voted by the fans, for the 2006/07 season, in only his second season at the club.
