= BBL Cup Winners' Cup =

British basketball competition

The Cup Winners' Cup was a peripheral cup competition of the British Basketball League. It was a pre-season tournament competed over two legs, one home and one away, between the winners of BBL Cup and BBL Trophy from the previous season. Each leg was staged prior to the beginning of the regular season and was considered the curtain-raiser for the new BBL campaign. The winner was decided over a total aggregate score over the two game series.

== History ==
The competition was first announced on 13 July 2007 with the inaugural series taking place between Guildford Heat (BBL Cup winners 2006-07) and Plymouth Raiders (BBL Trophy winners 2006-07).

The first leg, which took place on 9 September in Plymouth, saw a tight affair finish 83-77 to the visiting Guildford Heat, despite the Raiders clawing back from an 18-point deficit to take the lead during the third quarter. Another close game in the second leg played in Guildford the following weekend, on 15 September, saw the Guildford Heat defeat the Plymouth Raiders 93-91 and claim the inaugural BBL Cup Winners' Cup 176-168 on aggregate.

The second edition saw Trophy winners Heat competing to retain their crown against the 2008 BBL Cup winners Milton Keynes Lions. The first leg, played in Milton Keynes on 14 September, saw the visitors claim a slender advantage to win 89-91. The second leg, on 19 September, was almost as close and finished 68-60 to the home-court Heat, resulting in a 10-point aggregate victory for the Guildford Heat, who retained the Cup.

The Cup Winners' Cup hasn't been competed for since and thus was only staged twice.

== Previous finals ==
- 2007/08: Guildford Heat 176-168 Plymouth Raiders (Aggregate score)
- 2008/09: Guildford Heat 159-149 Milton Keynes Lions (Aggregate score)
