= London United (basketball) =

- League: EBL Division 2
- Established: 2002
- History: London United; 2002-present
- Arena: Alec Reed Academy
- Location: London, Greater London
- Team colours: Navy Blue and White
- Ownership: (Poland) Jack Majewski
| Home | Away |

London United is basketball team from London, England, currently competing in English Basketball League Division 2. In 2006 they were elected into the professional British Basketball League to replace the London Towers as the sole representatives for the capital city. However, after achieving a Play-off place in their first season, the franchise fell into a financial crisis and withdrew but continued to field a team in the lower leagues of the English Basketball League.

== Franchise history ==
=== The beginning ===
London United basketball club was formed in 2002 following a merger between two local teams, the Ealing Tornados and the North London Lords. Ealing Tornados were themselves a very successful team in the lower leagues, having won promotion after promotion since their foundation in 1999. When the merger took place at the end of the 2001–02 season, Ealing Tornados had just finished as runners-up in NBL Division 1 (Now known as EBL Division 2) behind the Derbyshire Arrows.

=== Further successes ===
Playing as London United, the successes continued with promotion to EBL Division 1 achieved just a year later, in 2003. United spent 3 years in Division 1 with their biggest success coming in 2004-05 when they finished as runners-up, again pipped to the title by the Arrows. The logical progression for the club was to join the fully professional British Basketball League in July 2006. However the decision was hastened when the London Towers withdrew from the 2006-07 season, leaving London without a professional basketball team.

=== The big step up ===
For owners Jack Majewski and David Schiller, the step-up meant finding a new venue, as well as recruiting more able players and finding corporate investments to fund the venture into the BBL. Jacks first step was to hire coach Tony Garbelotto to control the team on-court and bring in Chris Morris (who works closely with Tony Garbelotto running the highly successful Hackney Community College Basketball Academy programme based at SPACe) to run off-court operations. Majewski, Schiller, Garbelotto and Morris are the Club Directors. Sponsorship soon came, in the way of international money transferors MoneyGram, and a suitable venue was found at the Space Centre near Hackney. A mass influx of British players strengthened the ranks of United, with major signings including internationals Chris Haslam and Tarick Johnson.

=== 2006/07 ===
London played their first BBL game on 30 September 2006 on the road at Leicester Riders. Despite trailing 73–52 at the end of the third quarter, a last gasp effort and a 29–6 run resulted in an 81–79 victory for the rookies. United's successful start to the 2006-07 season continued with another road victory one week later against veterans the Scottish Rocks, who were defeated 76–70. London United finished the 06/07 season qualifying for the BBL Play-Offs in 8th place with an 11/25 record. Here, they were defeated narrowly by BBL Champions Guildford Heat. Tarick Johnson finished as the BBL's top-scorer with over 800pts at an average of 23 per game. Johnson was also voted by BBL coaches into the BBL "All-Star" Team of the season.

=== 2007-present ===
It was announced on 5 September 2007, just two weeks prior to the new season tipping-off, that London United's directors and the BBL had agreed to withdraw from the upcoming campaign. The press release stated that United's headline sponsor, MoneyGram, had endured financial difficulties of their own and were forced to withdraw their sponsorship. Without enough funds to compete, the club had no option but to 'park' the franchise for a year and work towards a return to the league for 2008–09. Following the shock announcement, the league was promptly reduced to 12 teams for the upcoming season, with rookies London Capital acting as the flagship for London basketball.

However, this setback did not wipe out the London United brand from the London basketball landscape. London United Basketball re-established itself at Richmond upon Thames College in order to concentrate on developing young elite basketball players and subsequently joined forces with Spelthorne Atoms Junior Basketball Club to create an extensive Junior Programme under the London United Basketball Club umbrella which enabled the Club to reach all age groups from Under 10s through to Senior Level.

In the last two years London United won promotion in two consecutive seasons and is now playing in England Basketball League Division Two. On top of this, in 2010 the Men's team also won the National Shield.

== Home arenas ==
Brunel University (2002-2006)
SPACe Centre (2006-2007)
Richmond College (2007-2010)
Harefield Academy (2011-2016)
Alec Reed Academy (2016-present)

== Season-by-season records ==
| Season | Div. | Pos. | Pld. | W | L | Pts. | Play Offs | Trophy | Cup |
|---|---|---|---|---|---|---|---|---|---|
London United
| 2002–2003 | NBL 1 | 3rd | - | - | - | - | - | DNQ | DNQ |
| 2003–2004 | EBL 1 | 6th | 22 | 11 | 11 | 22 | - | DNQ | DNQ |
| 2004–2005 | EBL 1 | 2nd | 22 | 18 | 4 | 36 | - | DNQ | DNQ |
| 2005–2006 | EBL 1 | 7th | 26 | 14 | 12 | 28 | - | DNQ | 1st round |
| 2006–2007 | BBL | 8th | 36 | 11 | 25 | 22 | Quarter-final | 1st round | 1st round |
| 2007–2008 | EBL 4 (Midlands South) | 4th | 17 | 11 | 6 | 22 | N/A | N/A | N/A |
| 2008–2009 | EBL 4 (Midlands South) | 2nd | 21 | 17 | 4 | 34 | Semi-final | 3rd round | 1st round |
| 2009–2010 | EBL 3 (South) | 2nd | 18 | 14 | 4 | 28 | Winners | Winners | 1st round |
| 2010–2011 | EBL 2 | 6th | 20 | 11 | 9 | 22 | Quarter-final | Runner-up | Semi-final |
| 2011–2012 | EBL 2 | 10th | 20 | 3 | 17 | 6 | DNQ | 1st round | 1st round |
| 2012–2013 | EBL 2 | 10th | 22 | 7 | 15 | 14 | DNQ | 1st round | 1st round |
| 2013–2014 | NBL 2 | 10th | 20 | 6 | 14 | 12 | DNQ | DNQ | 2nd round |
| 2013–2014 | NBL 4 (South East) as London United - Harefield Academy II | 11th | 21 | 3 | 18 | 6 | DNQ | DNQ | DNQ |
| 2014–2015 | NBL 2 | 12th | 22 | 3 | 19 | 6 | DNQ | DNQ | 1st round |
| 2014–2015 | NBL 4 (South West) as London United II | 10th | 20 | 3 | 17 | 6 | DNQ | DNQ | DNQ |
| 2015–2016 | NBL 3 (South) | 7th | 20 | 6 | 14 | 16 | DNQ | DNQ | 1st round |
| 2017–2018 | NBL 4 (South West) | 6th | 20 | 11 | 9 | 22 | DNQ | - | 2nd round |
| 2018–2019 | NBL 2 | 3rd | 20 | 11 | 9 | 22 | Semi-final | - | DNQ |
| 2021–2022 | NBL 3 (South) | 3rd | 10 | 6 | 4 | 12 | DNQ | - | DNQ |
| 2022–2023 | NBL 3 (South) | 2nd | 20 | 16 | 4 | 32 | 1st round | - | DNQ |
| 2023–2024 | NBL 3 (South) | 5th | 19 | 11 | 8 | 22 | DNQ | - | - |

Notes:

- NBL Division One operated as the third tier league behind the NBL Conference and BBL.
- In 2003, the NBL was replaced and restructured as the EBL. Division One was reinstated as the second tier league, instead of the former NBL Conference.
- DNQ denotes Did not qualify

== Sources ==
- "London United withdraw from BBL". BBC Sport. 5 September 2007. Archived from the original on 1 September 2026.
