= Cardiff Celts =

Basketball team in Cardiff, Wales

Cardiff CELTS
- League: EBL Division 1
- Arena: Sport Wales National Centre
- Location: Cardiff
- Team colours: Navy Blue & Red
- Head coach: Chris Horrocks
- Website: www.celtsbasketball.com
Home	Away

The Cardiff CELTS was a basketball team from Cardiff. The Celts competed in the English Basketball League, Division 1 and played their home games at the Sport Wales National Centre.

== See also ==
- Sport in Cardiff
