= Mike Martin (basketball, born 1974) =

British basketball player

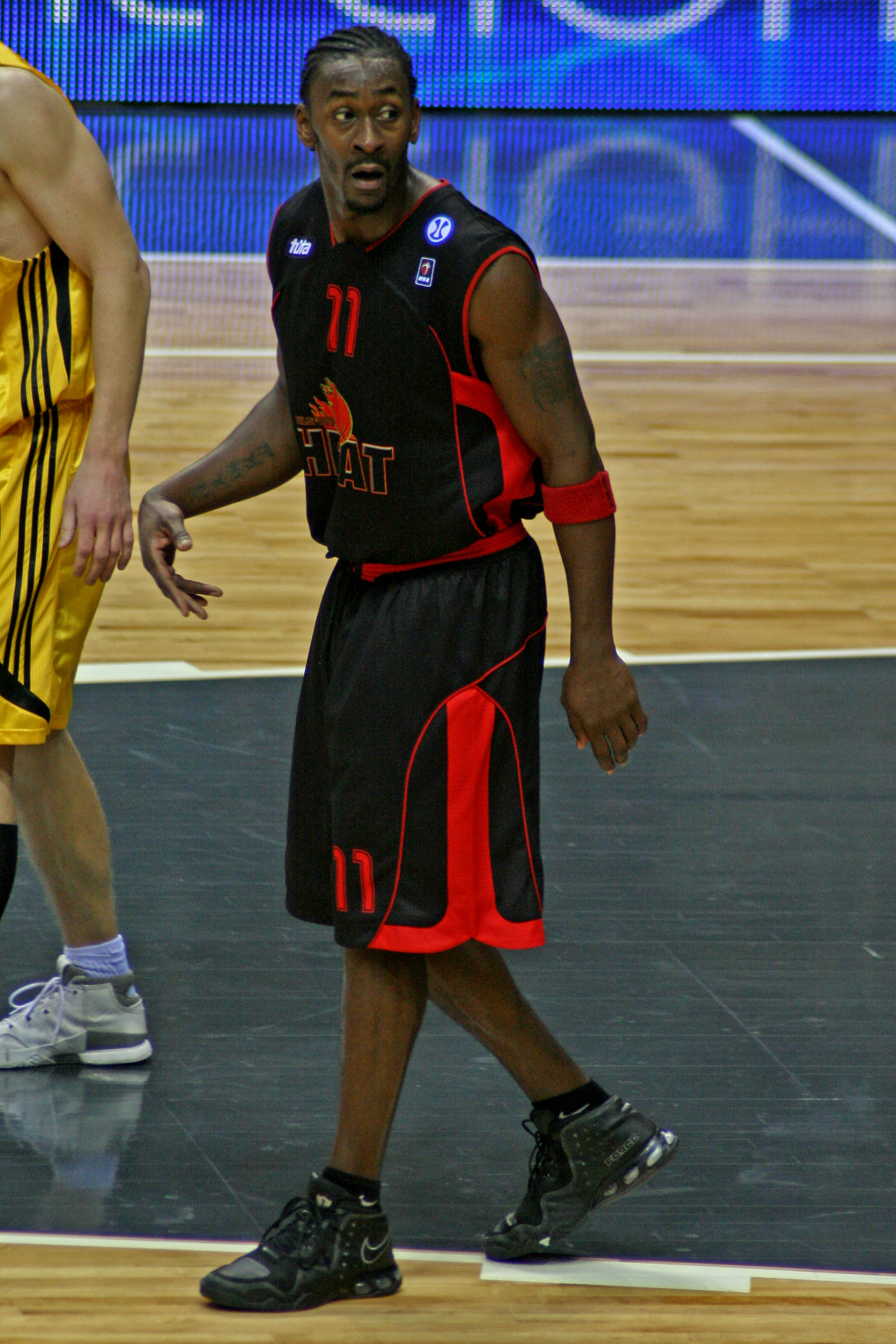

Personal information
- Born: 20 February 1974 (age 52) London, England
Medals
Men's basketball
Representing England
Commonwealth Games
Bronze medal – third place	2006 Melbourne	Team

Mike Martin (born 20 February 1974 in London, England) is a former British professional basketball player, who finished his career with the London Lions in the British Basketball League.

He is a current member of the British Masters over-45 team.

The 6ft6 Forward started his career in 1996, where he spent two years before signing professional with BBL club Milton Keynes Lions in 1998. However, after just one season, Martin started a nomadic career by signing for Leopards, in 1999, before moving to Brighton Bears and back to the Leopards, within the space of a few months.

In 2001, after two seasons with his hometown franchise, Martin signed for Thames Valley Tigers, the predecessors to his current club, Guildford. The following year, Martin was on the move again, this time to Europe, where he played for French team Saint Étienne, before moving back to the BBL to play for Scottish Rocks in 2003. After just a season back in his homeland, Martin moved again back to France, where he signed for JSF Nanterre of the Pro B Ligue.

In 2005, Martin signed for Guildford in their rookie season, and also won a bronze medal with England at the 2006 Commonwealth Games in Melbourne, Australia. In 2007, Martin was part of the Heat team that won their first piece of silverware in the BBL Cup final, on 7 January, in an 81–78 win against Scottish Rocks. Martin has been at the Heat ever since.
