= Tarick Johnson =

American basketball player

Tarick Johnson (born 1 December 1981 in (Lakenheath, England) is a former professional American basketball player who was born on a military base in England. He sports a 45-inch vertical jump and played for Bremerhaven in Germany. In which, he led team to league title as rookie at 19 PPG.

During the 2009–2010 season he played for CB Tarragona Tarragona 2017, in Spain after a season with Gijón Baloncesto, Spain in 2008, which he was top scorer of league at 21.0 PPG. Previously he played for CB L'Hospitalet in Spain, after a spell with London United basketball London, United.

Tarick joined London United in 2006 and lead the BBL league in scoring at 25 PPG after spells with Eisbaeren Bremerhaven in the German 1. Bundesliga and won title as rookie and had spell in Landstede Zwolle in the Netherlands' Premier League. Tarick is a member of Great Britain national basketball team and has also represented England at the university level in the World University Games whilst at Campbell University in the NCAA Men's Division I Basketball Championship NCAA I.
