= Bletchley Leisure Centre =

Leisure centre in Milton Keynes, England

Coordinates: 51.997121°N 0.726289°W

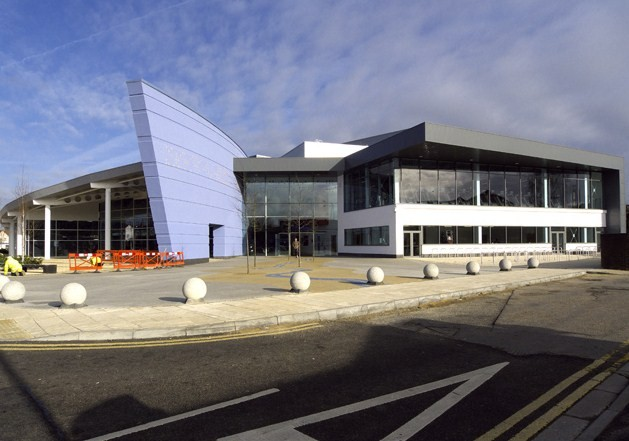
The New Bletchley Leisure Centre

The Bletchley Leisure Centre is an indoor leisure facility in Milton Keynes, Buckinghamshire, England.

The new Bletchley Leisure Centre opened in 2009 replacing the original centre.

The original centre opened in the 1970s replacing the outdoor queens pool. The centre was quite iconic with its pyramid building that housed the pool. Until the 1990s it also had a multi-storey car park with a snake-like walkway leading from the carpark to the centre reception.

The old centre and duck pond were demolished and the site was cleared for the new leisure centre and a new multi storey car park. Some groups tried to get the pyramid building listed to prevent demolition.

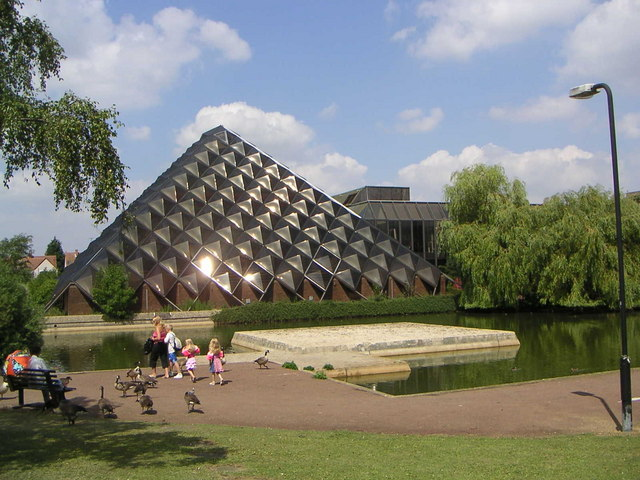
The Original centre, with pyramid pool

The old centre housed a 907-seat capacity sports hall which was the home of professional basketball club Milton Keynes Lions. The Leisure Centre has been home to the Lions basketball team since 1998, when the Hemel Hempstead Royals later Watford Royals relocated here.

The Milton Keynes Lions had planned to move into Arena:MK, a new 4,500-seat arena at the stadium:mk site in Denbigh, Milton Keynes, before the start of the 2008-2009 season. However, completion of this arena has been delayed due deferral of proposed commercial developments around the site (which would have funded the build). The Lions original home in Bletchley became scheduled for demolition, leaving the club searching urgently for a new base. Subsequently, the Lions obtained agreement to play their home games in Middleton Hall in Central Milton Keynes. The Lions subsequently moved to a warehouse in Grafton Gate, having converted it into a 1,400-seat basketball arena and practice venue.

== See also ==
- Bletchley
