= Brian Dux =

American basketball player

Brian Dux (born April 7, 1981, in Orchard Park, New York) is an American former professional basketball player who played for the Guildford Heat in the British Basketball League.

== College career ==
Dux attended Canisius College where he starred for Golden Griffs in the MAAC, part of NCAA Division I. As a freshman in 1999-00, he appeared in all 30 games, making 21 starts, and averaged 6.7 points per game. He started all 31 games in his sophomore campaign, averaging 9.9 points per game and leading the team with 127 assists. In 2001–02, he averaged 10.4 points per game with 145 assists as the Golden Griffins went to the 2001 MAAC Tournament Championship game. That year, Dux picked up many awards including MAAC All-Academic Team and MAAC State Lottery Scholar-Athlete of the Year. As a senior, he averaged 14.9 points per game. He ended his college career with 1239 points scored and 508 assists.

== Professional career ==
Dux signed professional in 2003 when he joined Dutch team Cape Holland Den Helder in the Eredivisie. In 2005, Dux signed for Guildford Heat in their rookie season, and was included in the BBL All-Star Team for that season. In 2007, Dux lead the Heat to their first piece of silverware with an MVP performance in the BBL Cup final, on January 7, in an 81–78 win against Scottish Rocks.

== Accident ==
Brian Dux was seriously injured in a car accident during the early hours of Saturday November 10, 2007. No other vehicle was involved. Brian was taken to a Surrey hospital where he remained in intensive care.

On the Saturday night, Dux was driving home at 4:40 a.m. when he lost control of his car and crashed into a tree on Bagshot Road in the town of Chobham in Surrey, England. The arrival of an ambulance was delayed by a communications failure between local police and healthcare services. Surrey Police have launched a review into the delay.

As of November 24, Guildford Heat are reporting that the injuries sustained by Dux in the accident "appear to be potentially far worse than previously thought. Discussions between Dux family members and Frimley Park Hospital consultants have now taken into consideration the possibility that Brian Dux may have suffered permanent disability from his single car automobile accident." . Brain scans showed severe bleeding, damage almost certain. He might never walk again. He might be blind. He might never wake up.

Two calls were made to ambulance services, spaced an hour apart, but it was over two hours before an ambulance arrived. The first responders, local firefighters, have been sharply critical of the delay in receiving the call out.

On December 2, Brian Dux returned to the United States, after a medical jet with Prior Aviation transported him to Buffalo Niagara International Airport. Several benefit events were performed in his honour and in his support. Dux is now at Home, while going to Erie County Medical Center for rehab, less than two miles from where he became a college basketball star at Canisius.
