= 2022–23 London Lions season =

- BBL champions
- Playoff champions
- Cup champions
- Head coach: (United States) Ryan Schmidt
- Captain: (United States) Sam Dekker
- Arena: Copper Box Arena

BBL results
- Record: 32–4 (.889)
- Ladder: 1st
- BBL Cup: Champions (3rd title) (Defeated Riders 71–79)
- BBL Trophy: Quarterfinalist (lost to Gladiators 52–50)
- Playoff finish: Champions (1st title) (Defeated Riders 88–80)
- EuroCup: Eightfinalist
- Stats at BBL.org.uk

Player records
- Points: (United States) S. Dekker 17.1
- Rebounds: (Greece) K. Koufos 9.4
- Assists: (United States) T. Taylor 5.2
- All statistics correct as of 23 April 2023.

The 2022–23 London Lions season was the 46th season of the franchise in the British Basketball League (BBL), and their 11th under the banner of London Lions.

This season will be their first under the leadership of their new head coach Ryan Schmidt, and their first season in the EuroCup Basketball competition.

== Roster ==
Note: Flags indicate national team eligibility at FIBA-sanctioned events. Players may hold other non-FIBA nationalities not displayed.

2022–23 London Lions roster
Players
Coaches

Pos.	No.	Nat.	Name	Ht.	Wt.	Age
F	0	(United Kingdom)	Soko, Ovie (injured) (IN)	2.01 m (6 ft 7 in)	100 kg (220 lb)	34 – 7 February 1991
C	1	(Croatia)	Zubčić, Tomislav (I)	2.11 m (6 ft 11 in)	110 kg (243 lb)	35 – 17 January 1990
G/F	2	(United Kingdom)	Ward-Hibbert, Joshua	1.96 m (6 ft 5 in)	86 kg (190 lb)	31 – 25 January 1994
G	3	(Canada)	Best, Aaron (I)	1.93 m (6 ft 4 in)	85 kg (187 lb)	32 – 1 September 1992
G	4	(United States)	Taylor, Jordan (I)	1.85 m (6 ft 1 in)	88 kg (194 lb)	35 – 30 September 1989
G/F	6	(United Kingdom)	Soluade, Morayo	1.96 m (6 ft 5 in)	89 kg (196 lb)	29 – 12 July 1995
F	7	(United States)	Dekker, Sam (C & I)	2.03 m (6 ft 8 in)	99 kg (218 lb)	30 – 6 May 1994
F	8	(United Kingdom)	Welche, Zamoku	1.99 m (6 ft 6 in)		20 – 16 October 2004
G	10	(United Kingdom)	Nelson, Luke	1.91 m (6 ft 3 in)	86 kg (190 lb)	29 – 29 June 1995
G	11	(Saint Kitts and Nevis)	Queeley, Kareem (injured)	1.93 m (6 ft 4 in)	91 kg (201 lb)	24 – 30 March 2001
F	13	(Nigeria)	Oni, Miye	1.96 m (6 ft 5 in)	93 kg (205 lb)	27 – 4 August 1997
C	20	(United Kingdom)	Sharma, Josh	2.13 m (7 ft 0 in)	104 kg (229 lb)	28 – 28 September 1996
C	21	(Uganda)	Komagum, Jonathan	2.06 m (6 ft 9 in)	98 kg (216 lb)	26 – 13 November 1998
G	22	(United Kingdom)	Phillip, Tarik	1.91 m (6 ft 3 in)	87 kg (192 lb)	31 – 10 August 1993
G	31	(United Kingdom)	Kaboza, Bradley	1.88 m (6 ft 2 in)	79 kg (174 lb)	23 – 29 June 2001
C	41	(Greece)	Koufos, Kosta (injured) (I)	2.13 m (7 ft 0 in)	125 kg (276 lb)	36 – 24 February 1989
F	77	(Czech Republic)	Hruban, Vojtěch (I)	2.00 m (6 ft 7 in)	87 kg (192 lb)	35 – 29 August 1989

Head coach

- (United States) Ryan Schmidt

Assistant coach(es)

- (Turkey) Polat Kaya
- (United Kingdom) Robert Youngblood

Legend

- (C) Team captain
- (DP) Development player
- (IN) Inactive
- (I) Import player
- Injured

- Roster
Updated: 21 April 2023

== Standings ==
=== Ladder ===
Pos	Team	Pld	W	L	PF	PA	PD	Pts	Qualification
1	London Lions (C)	36	32	4	3168	2592	+576	64	Playoffs
2	Leicester Riders	36	25	11	3185	2951	+234	50	Playoffs
3	Bristol Flyers	36	25	11	2993	2873	+120	50	Playoffs
4	Caledonia Gladiators	36	19	17	3005	2990	+15	38	Playoffs
5	Cheshire Phoenix	36	19	17	2948	2927	+21	38	Playoffs
6	Manchester Giants	36	17	19	3228	3223	+5	34	Playoffs
7	Sheffield Sharks	36	17	19	2668	2691	−23	34	Playoffs
8	Newcastle Eagles	36	11	25	2879	3034	−155	22	Playoffs
9	Plymouth City Patriots	36	11	25	2845	3254	−409	22	
10	Surrey Scorchers	36	4	32	2763	3147	−384	8	

Updated to match(es) played on 23 April 2023. Source: BBC Sport
(C) Champions

The BBL tie-breaker system as outlined in the BBL Rules and Regulations states that in the case of an identical win–loss record, the results in games played between the teams will determine order of seeding.

Leader and qualification to playoffs
Qualification to playoffs
Last place

2022–23 BBL Championship
Team ╲ Round	1	2	3	4	5	6	7	8	9	10	11	12	13	14	15	16	17	18	19	20	21	22	23	24	25	26	27	28	29
Bristol Flyers	3	3	3	2	2	2	2	2	1	3	3	3	3	3	2	2	2	2	2	2	2	2	2	2	2	2	3	3	3
Caledonia Gladiators	—	—	6	8	7	8	8	8	8	6	7	5	4	5	6	6	6	5	5	4	4	5	4	5	5	5	4	4	4
Cheshire Phoenix	4	4	4	4	5	6	5	6	7	5	6	7	6	4	4	4	4	4	4	6	6	6	6	6	7	6	6	5	5
Leicester Riders	—	6	5	6	8	4	3	3	3	2	2	2	1	2	3	3	3	3	3	3	3	3	3	3	3	3	2	2	2
London Lions	1	2	1	1	1	1	1	1	2	1	1	1	2	1	1	1	1	1	1	1	1	1	1	1	1	1	1	1	1
Manchester Giants	5	1	2	3	3	3	4	4	5	7	8	8	8	7	5	5	5	6	6	5	5	4	5	4	4	4	5	7	6
Newcastle Eagles	—	8	10	10	9	9	9	9	9	9	9	9	9	9	9	9	9	9	9	9	9	9	9	9	9	9	9	9	8
Plymouth City Patriots	2	5	7	7	6	7	7	7	6	8	4	4	5	6	7	7	7	7	7	7	7	7	8	8	8	8	8	8	9
Sheffield Sharks	7	9	8	5	4	5	6	5	4	4	5	6	7	8	8	8	8	8	8	8	8	8	7	7	6	7	7	6	7
Surrey Scorchers	6	7	9	9	10	10	10	10	10	10	10	10	10	10	10	10	10	10	10	10	10	10	10	10	10	10	10	10	10

Updated to match(es) played on 23 April 2023. Source: BBL.org.uk

=== EuroCup ladder ===
Pos	Team	Pld	W	L	PF	PA	PD	Qualification
1	(Spain) Gran Canaria	18	15	3	1535	1411	+124	Advance to eighthfinals
2	(Turkey) Türk Telekom	18	13	5	1516	1412	+104	Advance to eighthfinals
3	(Israel) Hapoel Tel Aviv	18	13	5	1589	1395	+194	Advance to eighthfinals
4	(Greece) Promitheas	18	11	7	1482	1504	−22	Advance to eighthfinals
5	(France) Paris Basketball	18	10	8	1545	1539	+6	Advance to eighthfinals
6	(Montenegro) Budućnost VOLI	18	9	9	1396	1348	+48	Advance to eighthfinals
7	(United Kingdom) London Lions	18	8	10	1454	1454	0	Advance to eighthfinals
8	(Germany) Hamburg Towers	18	6	12	1459	1535	−76	Advance to eighthfinals
9	(Italy) Dolomiti Energia Trento	18	4	14	1315	1471	−156	
10	(Poland) Śląsk Wrocław	18	1	17	1312	1534	−222	

Source: EuroCup
Rules for classification: All points scored in extra period(s) will not be counted in the standings, nor for any tie-break situation.

== Game log ==
=== BBL Championships ===
2022–23 game log
Total: 32–4 (home: 17–1; road: 15–3)
September: 2–0 (Home: 1–0; Road: 1–0)

Game	Date	Team	Score	High points	High rebounds	High assists	Location Attendance	Record
1	23 September	@ Sheffield	W 73–86	Sam Dekker (23)	Kosta Koufos (8)	Ovie Soko (5)	Ponds Forge; 1,000	1–0
2	30 September	Leicester	W 89–78	Tomislav Zubčić (20)	Sam Dekker (11)	Luke Nelson (8)	Copper Box Arena not available	2–0

October: 5–1 (Home: 3–0; Road: 2–1)

Game	Date	Team	Score	High points	High rebounds	High assists	Location Attendance	Record
3	5 October	Caledonia	W 95–87	Sam Dekker (30)	Sam Dekker (8)	Queeley, van Oostrum (4)	Copper Box Arena not available	3–0
4	7 October	@ Newcastle	W 72–85	Sam Dekker (15)	Josh Sharma (8)	Luke Nelson (5)	Vertu Motors Arena not available	4–0
5	15 October	@ Surrey	W 64–83	Luke Nelson (18)	Nelson, Sharma, Zubčić (6)	Luke Nelson (5)	Surrey Sports Park; 1,000	5–0
6	21 October	Cheshire	W 75–60	Vojtěch Hruban (17)	Devon van Oostrum (6)	Luke Nelson (4)	Copper Box Arena not available	6–0
7	23 October	Manchester	W 91–83	Tomislav Zubčić (22)	Kosta Koufos (9)	Devon van Oostrum (7)	Copper Box Arena not available	7–0
8	28 October	@ Sheffield	L 87–81	Tomislav Zubčić (25)	Kosta Koufos (14)	Aaron Best (6)	Ponds Forge; 300	7–1

November: 0–1 (Home: 0–0; Road: 0–1)

Game	Date	Team	Score	High points	High rebounds	High assists	Location Attendance	Record
9	6 November	@ Bristol	L 75–71	Sam Dekker (28)	Kosta Koufos (10)	Luke Nelson (4)	SGS College Arena; 800	7–2

December: 5–0 (Home: 3–0; Road: 2–0)

Game	Date	Team	Score	High points	High rebounds	High assists	Location Attendance	Record
10	1 December	Manchester	W 95–71	Josh Sharma (28)	Joshua Ward-Hibbert (9)	Luke Nelson (11)	Copper Box Arena; 750	8–2
11	11 December	@ Cheshire	W 74–89	Ovie Soko (12)	Kosta Koufos (11)	Nelson, Soluade (5)	Cheshire Oaks Arena; 1,100	9–2
12	16 December	Bristol	W 95–60	Sam Dekker (25)	Kosta Koufos (11)	Dekker, Soluade (5)	Copper Box Arena not available	10–2
13	27 December	@ Leicester	W 75–81	Sam Dekker (21)	Kosta Koufos (14)	Jordan Taylor (10)	Morningside Arena; 666	11–2
14	30 December	Plymouth	W 87–63	Luke Nelson (19)	Joshua Ward-Hibbert (12)	Jordan Taylor (6)	Copper Box Arena; 3,000	12–2

January: 4–0 (Home: 2–0; Road: 2–0)

Game	Date	Team	Score	High points	High rebounds	High assists	Location Attendance	Record
15	8 January	@ Caledonia	W 60–84	Aaron Best (15)	Josh Sharma (10)	Luke Nelson (6)	Emirates Arena; 900	13–2
16	20 January	@ Surrey	W 67–88	Aaron Best (18)	Joshua Ward-Hibbert (7)	Morayo Soluade (5)	Surrey Sports Park; 1,000	14–2
17	22 January	Sheffield	W 75–63	Aaron Best (18)	Komagum, Koufos (9)	Dekker, Soluade (4)	Copper Box Arena; 4,382	15–2
18	26 January	Cheshire	W 89–79	Tomislav Zubčić (19)	Sam Dekker (8)	Jordan Taylor (7)	Copper Box Arena; 964	16–2

February: 4–0 (Home: 2–0; Road: 2–0)

Game	Date	Team	Score	High points	High rebounds	High assists	Location Attendance	Record
19	5 February	@ Plymouth	W 79–88	Tomislav Zubčić (21)	Ovie Soko (8)	Tomislav Zubčić (8)	Plymouth Pavilions not available	17–2
20	12 February	@ Cheshire	W 65–86	Luke Nelson (21)	Josh Sharma (12)	Luke Nelson (9)	Cheshire Oaks Arena; 1,200	18–2
21	14 February	Surrey	W 88–62	Vojtěch Hruban (18)	Tomislav Zubčić (7)	Luke Nelson (9)	Copper Box Arena; 2,402	19–2
22	19 February	Bristol	W 82–64	Koufos, Nelson (18)	Kosta Koufos (11)	Jordan Taylor (5)	Copper Box Arena; 3,410	20–2

March: 7–1 (Home: 3–1; Road: 4–0)

Game	Date	Team	Score	High points	High rebounds	High assists	Location Attendance	Record
23	3 March	@ Leicester	W 77–102	Sam Dekker (18)	Jonathan Komagum (8)	Jordan Taylor (7)	Morningside Arena not available	21–2
24	5 March	Caledonia	W 99–67	Vojtěch Hruban (21)	Oni, Sharma (6)	Jordan Taylor (6)	Copper Box Arena; 3,500	22–2
25	10 March	@ Manchester	W 76–87	Sam Dekker (18)	Miye Oni (10)	Jordan Taylor (4)	National Basketball Centre not available	23–2
26	12 March	@ Plymouth	W 51–102	Sam Dekker (18)	Joshua Ward-Hibbert (8)	Sam Dekker (8)	Plymouth Pavilions; 1,000	24–2
27	17 March	@ Newcastle	W 85–88	Sam Dekker (17)	Josh Sharma (5)	Jordan Taylor (7)	Vertu Motors Arena; 3,000	25–2
28	19 March	Sheffield	L 80–82	Sam Dekker (24)	Miye Oni (8)	Hruban, Soluade, Taylor, Zubčić (3)	Copper Box Arena; 2,663	25–3
29	23 March	Newcastle	W 100–69	Vojtěch Hruban (19)	Jonathan Komagum (10)	Oni, Taylor (5)	Copper Box Arena; 1,549	26–3
30	31 March	Surrey	W 88–75	Vojtěch Hruban (17)	Vojtěch Hruban (8)	Nelson, Taylor (6)	Copper Box Arena; 3,395	27–3

April: 5–1 (Home: 3–0; Road: 2–1)

Game	Date	Team	Score	High points	High rebounds	High assists	Location Attendance	Record
31	2 April	@ Bristol	L 87–82 (OT)	Jordan Taylor (19)	Ward-Hibbert, Zubčić (7)	Aaron Best (4)	SGS College Arena; 800	27–4
32	7 April	Leicester	W 83–81	Miye Oni (18)	Morayo Soluade (7)	Best, Oni, Nelson, Zubčić (3)	Copper Box Arena; 4,590	28–4
33	9 April	@ Manchester	W 90–96	Aaron Best (28)	Best, Dekker (6)	Jordan Taylor (6)	National Basketball Centre; 200	29–4
34	16 April	Newcastle	W 89–68	Aaron Best (20)	Aaron Best (7)	Jordan Taylor (8)	Copper Box Arena; 4,176	30–4
35	21 April	Plymouth	W 96–62	Vojtěch Hruban (25)	Josh Sharma (6)	Jordan Taylor (8)	Copper Box Arena; 3,694	31–4
36	23 April	@ Caledonia	W 61–93	Vojtěch Hruban (19)	Josh Sharma (8)	Nelson, Taylor (6)	Emirates Arena; 700	32–4

2022–23 season schedule

=== EuroCup ===
2022–23 game log
Total: 8–10 (home: 3–6; road: 5–4)
October: 1–2 (Home: 1–0; Road: 0–2)

Game	Date	Team	Score	High points	High rebounds	High assists	Location Attendance	Record
1	12 October	@ Hapoel Tel Aviv	L 76–59	Tomislav Zubčić (21)	Kosta Koufos (10)	Devon van Oostrum (5)	Drive in Arena; 3,514	0–1
2	19 October	Trento	W 80–75	Ovie Soko (22)	Ovie Soko (14)	Hruban, Nelson (4)	Copper Box Arena; 2,183	1–1
3	26 October	@ Gran Canaria	L 87–69	Vojtěch Hruban (18)	Ovie Soko (9)	Ovie Soko (5)	Gran Canaria Arena; 2,411	1–2

November: 2–1 (Home: 1–1; Road: 1–0)

Game	Date	Team	Score	High points	High rebounds	High assists	Location Attendance	Record
4	2 November	Budućnost	L 78–87	Best, Dekker (15)	Josh Sharma (6)	Sam Dekker (6)	Wembley Arena; 1,791	1–3
5	23 November	@ Hamburg	W 75–103	Tomislav Zubčić (22)	Sam Dekker (7)	Oni, Soluade (6)	Edel-optics.de Arena; 1,688	2–3
6	30 November	Wrocław	W 97–80	Sam Dekker (18)	Koufos, Soko (6)	Luke Nelson (6)	Copper Box Arena; 1,801	3–3

December: 1–2 (Home: 0–1; Road: 1–1)

Game	Date	Team	Score	High points	High rebounds	High assists	Location Attendance	Record
7	7 December	@ Patras	W 67–77	Sam Dekker (20)	Kosta Koufos (9)	Luke Nelson (4)	Dimitris Tofalos Arena; 507	4–3
8	15 December	@ Türk Telekom	L 102–74	Sam Dekker (20)	Dekker, Koufos (7)	Sam Dekker (6)	Ankara Spor Salonu; 6,137	4–4
9	22 December	Paris	L 80–93	Sam Dekker (19)	Kosta Koufos (10)	Jordan Taylor (9)	Copper Box Arena; 5,297	4–5

January: 1–2 (Home: 0–2; Road: 1–0)

Game	Date	Team	Score	High points	High rebounds	High assists	Location Attendance	Record
10	11 January	Hapoel Tel Aviv	L 93–95	Sam Dekker (29)	Kosta Koufos (9)	Jordan Taylor (9)	Wembley Arena; 2,907	4–6
11	19 January	@ Trento	W 70–84	Sam Dekker (23)	Dekker, Koufos (10)	Jordan Taylor (8)	Blm Group Arena; 1,389	5–6
12	25 January	Gran Canaria	L 57–60	Sam Dekker (18)	Kosta Koufos (11)	Jordan Taylor (5)	Copper Box Arena; 2,306	5–7

February: 1–1 (Home: 1–0; Road: 0–1)

Game	Date	Team	Score	High points	High rebounds	High assists	Location Attendance	Record
13	2 February	@ Budućnost	L 78–68	Sam Dekker (27)	Sam Dekker (8)	Jordan Taylor (4)	Morača Sports Center; 1,515	5–8
14	9 February	Hamburg	W 83–66	Kosta Koufos (17)	Kosta Koufos (11)	Dekker, Hruban (4)	Copper Box Arena; 3,813	6–8

March: 2–2 (Home: 0–2; Road: 2–0)

Game	Date	Team	Score	High points	High rebounds	High assists	Location Attendance	Record
15	9 March	@ Wrocław	W 76–83	Jordan Taylor (23)	Miye Oni (12)	Miye Oni (4)	Centennial Hall; 2,146	7–8
16	16 March	Patras	L 89–93	Tomislav Zubčić (24)	Sharma, Zubčić (9)	Miye Oni (5)	Copper Box Arena; 2,678	7–9
17	22 March	Türk Telekom	L 84–89	Sam Dekker (25)	Oni, Sharma (6)	Jordan Taylor (7)	Copper Box Arena; 4,092	7–10
18	30 March	@ Paris	W 85–96	Tomislav Zubčić (24)	Josh Sharma (6)	Jordan Taylor (8)	Halle Georges Carpentier; 800	8–10

2022–23 eurocup schedule

=== EuroCup Playoffs ===
2023 finals game log
Total: 0–1 (home: 0–0; road: 0–1)
Eightfinals: 0–1 (Home: 0–0; Road: 0–1)

Game	Date	Team	Score	High points	High rebounds	High assists	Location Attendance	Record
1	12 April	@ Joventut	L 89–78	Tomislav Zubčić (19)	Oni, Soluade, Taylor, Zubčić (3)	Oni, Nelson (5)	Palau Olimpic De Badalona; 7,105	0–1

2023 finals schedule

=== BBL Cup ===
2022–23 BBL Cup game log
Total: 3–0 (home: 1–0; road: 2–0)
Quarterfinal: 1–0 (Home: 1–0; Road: 0–0)

Game	Date	Team	Score	High points	High rebounds	High assists	Location Attendance	Record
1	26 November	Cheshire	W 74–65	Hruban, Nelson (12)	Komagum, Koufos, Ward-Hibbert (6)	Nelson, Oni (4)	Copper Box Arena; 1,500	1–0

Semifinal: 1–0 (Home: 0–0; Road: 1–0)

Game	Date	Team	Score	High points	High rebounds	High assists	Location Attendance	Record
2	19 December	@ Bristol	W 79–97	Kosta Koufos (24)	Kosta Koufos (7)	Jordan Taylor (6)	SGS College Arena; 770	2–0

Cup Final: 1–0 (Home: 0–0; Road: 1–0)

Game	Date	Team	Score	High points	High rebounds	High assists	Location Attendance	Record
3	29 January	@ Leicester	W 71–79	Sam Dekker (22)	Kosta Koufos (12)	Jordan Taylor (4)	Utilita Arena Birmingham; 10,000	3–0

2022–23 cup schedule

=== BBL Trophy ===
2023 BBL Trophy game log
Total: 1–1 (home: 1–0; road: 0–1)
First round: 1–0 (Home: 1–0; Road: 0–0)

Game	Date	Team	Score	High points	High rebounds	High assists	Location Attendance	Record
1	12 January	Worthing	W 89–53	Aaron Best (24)	Komagum, Ward-Hibbert (13)	Luke Nelson (7)	Copper Box Arena not available	1–0

Quarterfinal: 0–1 (Home: 0–0; Road: 0–1)

Game	Date	Team	Score	High points	High rebounds	High assists	Location Attendance	Record
2	10 February	@ Caledonia	L 52–50	Joshua Ward-Hibbert (14)	Joshua Ward-Hibbert (8)	Luke Nelson (4)	Emirates Arena; 500	1–1

2022–23 trophy schedule

=== Playoffs ===
2023 playoff game log
Total: 5–0 (home: 3–0; road: 2–0)
Quarterfinals: 2–0 (Home: 1–0; Road: 1–0)

Game	Date	Team	Score	High points	High rebounds	High assists	Location Attendance	Record
1	28 April	@ Newcastle	W 78–108	Josh Sharma (18)	Miye Oni (8)	Nelson, Taylor (5)	Vertu Motors Arena; 2,214	1–0
2	1 May	Newcastle	W 99–86	Sharma, Taylor (18)	Josh Sharma (5)	Luke Nelson (7)	Crystal Palace National Sports Centre; 1,039	2–0

Semifinals: 2–0 (Home: 1–0; Road: 1–0)

Game	Date	Team	Score	High points	High rebounds	High assists	Location Attendance	Record
3	7 May	Cheshire	W 82–74	Tomislav Zubčić (15)	Josh Sharma (9)	Jordan Taylor (8)	Crystal Palace National Sports Centre; 912	3–0
4	8 May	@ Cheshire	W 81–102	Best, Sharma (16)	Aaron Best (7)	Nelson, Soluade, Taylor (5)	Cheshire Oaks Arena not available	4–0

Playoff final: 1–0 (Home: 1–0; Road: 0–0)

Game	Date	Team	Score	High points	High rebounds	High assists	Location Attendance	Record
5	14 May	Leicester	W 88–80	Best, Taylor (15)	Miye Oni (10)	Jordan Taylor (7)	The O2 Arena; 3,000	5–0

2023 playoff schedule

== Transactions ==
=== Re-signed ===
Player	Signed
Joshua Ward-Hibbert	3 July
Bradley Kaboza	5 August

=== Additions ===
Player	Signed	Former team
Morayo Soluade	5 July	Básquet Coruña
Ovie Soko	8 July	Shiga Lakestars
Josh Sharma	12 July	Trefl Sopot
Kareem Queeley	14 July	San Pablo Burgos
Kosta Koufos	15 July	NBA G League Ignite
Vojtěch Hruban	22 July	Basketball Nymburk
Luke Nelson	3 August	ESSM Le Portel
Sam Dekker	7 August	Bahçeşehir Koleji S.K.
Tarik Phillip	9 August	San Pablo Burgos
Aaron Best	14 August	Hamilton Honey Badgers
Jonathan Komagum	25 August	Sacramento State
Devon van Oostrum	7 September	Landstede Hammers
Miye Oni	17 November	Utah Jazz
Jordan Taylor	12 December	U-BT Cluj-Napoca

=== Subtractions ===
Player	Reason left	New team
Will Neighbour	Free agent	Cheshire Phoenix
Dirk Williams	Free agent	Manchester Giants
Chris Tawiah	Free agent	KK MZT Skopje
Devon van Oostrum	Released	n/a
Ryan Martin	Free agent	Surrey Scorchers
Ovie Soko	Inactive	n/a

== See also ==
- 2022–23 British Basketball League season
- London Lions
