= 2022–23 British Basketball League season =

36th season of the British Basketball League

2022–23 BBL season
- League: British Basketball League
- Season: 2022–23
- Dates: 23 September 2022 – 23 April 2023
- Games played: 180
- Teams: 10
- TV partner(s): Great Britain: Sky Sports; BBC Sport; Online: YouTube

Regular season
- League champions: London Lions (2nd title)
- BBL Cup: London Lions (3rd title)
- BBL Trophy: Caledonia Gladiators (1st title)
- Season MVP: (United States) Sam Dekker (London)

Playoffs
- Champions: London Lions (1st title)
- Runners-up: Leicester Riders
- Finals MVP: (United States) Jordan Taylor (London)

Statistical leaders
Points	(United States) J. Hamlet (Newcastle)	20.1
Rebounds	(United States) T.Green (Manchester)	9.2
Assists	(United States) R. Fletcher (Manchester)	8.6
Efficiency	(United States) R. Hassan (Plymouth)	61%

BBL seasons
- ← 2021–22 2023–24 →
- All statistics correct as of 14 May 2023.

The 2022–23 BBL season was the 36th season of the British Basketball League, the top British professional basketball league, since its establishment in 1987. The season featured 10 teams from across England and Scotland.

== Teams ==
Locations of the 2022–23 BBL teams

=== Arenas and locations ===
Team	Location	Arena	Capacity
Bristol Flyers	Bristol	SGS College Arena	750
Caledonia Gladiators	Glasgow	Emirates Arena	1,650
Cheshire Phoenix	Ellesmere Port	Cheshire Oaks Arena	1,400
Leicester Riders	Leicester	Morningside Arena	2,400
London Lions	London	Copper Box Arena	6,000
Manchester Giants	Manchester	National Basketball Centre	2,000
Newcastle Eagles	Newcastle upon Tyne	Vertu Motors Arena	3,000
Plymouth City Patriots	Plymouth	Plymouth Pavilions	1,500
Sheffield Sharks	Sheffield	Ponds Forge	1,000
Surrey Scorchers	Guildford	Surrey Sports Park	1,000

- On 13 September 2022, Glasgow Rocks were rebranded as Caledonia Gladiators.

=== Personnel and sponsorship ===
Team	Head coach	Captain	Main sponsor
Bristol Flyers	(Greece) Andreas Kapoulas	(United States) Michael Miller	Xledger
Caledonia Gladiators	(Scotland) Gareth Murray	(Scotland) Jonny Bunyan	
Cheshire Phoenix	(England) Ben Thomas	(United States) Larry Austin Jr.	HM Legal
Leicester Riders	(United States) Rob Paternostro	(United States) Darien Nelson-Henry	Jelson Homes
London Lions	(United States) Ryan Schmidt	(United States) Sam Dekker	StockX
Manchester Giants	(England) Vince Macaulay	(United States) Rahmon Fletcher	
Newcastle Eagles	(England) Marc Steutel	(England) Darius Defoe	Newcastle College
Plymouth City Patriots	(England) Paul James	(Albania) Elvisi Dusha	Portcullis Legal
Sheffield Sharks	(United States) Atiba Lyons	(United States) Rodney Glasgow Jr.	B.Braun
Surrey Scorchers	(England) Lloyd Gardner	(England) Tayo Ogedengbe	

=== Coaching changes ===
Team	Outgoing coach	Manner of departure	Date of vacancy	Position in table	Incoming coach	Date of appointment
Newcastle Eagles	(England) Ian Macleod	Stepping down	13 April 2022	Pre-season	(England) Marc Steutel	13 May 2022
London Lions	(England) Nikhil Lawry	End of interim period	16 May 2022	Pre-season	(United States) Ryan Schmidt	1 July 2022
Surrey Scorchers	(Zimbabwe) Creon Raftopoulos	Mutual agreement	26 May 2022	Pre-season	(England) Lloyd Gardner	17 June 2022
Manchester Giants	(England) Lloyd Gardner	Signed by Surrey Scorchers	17 June 2022	Pre-season	(England) Vince Macaulay	16 July 2022

== BBL Championship ==
The BBL Championship reverted to a four-game series format, for the first time since the 2006–07 season, for a 36-game regular season played across 29 Rounds between September 2022 to April 2023.

=== Standings ===
Pos	Team	Pld	W	L	PF	PA	PD	Pts	Qualification
1	London Lions (C)	36	32	4	3168	2592	+576	64	Playoffs
2	Leicester Riders	36	25	11	3185	2951	+234	50	Playoffs
3	Bristol Flyers	36	25	11	2993	2873	+120	50	Playoffs
4	Caledonia Gladiators	36	19	17	3005	2990	+15	38	Playoffs
5	Cheshire Phoenix	36	19	17	2948	2927	+21	38	Playoffs
6	Manchester Giants	36	17	19	3228	3223	+5	34	Playoffs
7	Sheffield Sharks	36	17	19	2668	2691	−23	34	Playoffs
8	Newcastle Eagles	36	11	25	2879	3034	−155	22	Playoffs
9	Plymouth City Patriots	36	11	25	2845	3254	−409	22	
10	Surrey Scorchers	36	4	32	2763	3147	−384	8	

Updated to match(es) played on 23 April 2023. Source: BBC Sport
(C) Champions

=== Results ===
Home \ Away	BRI	CAL	CHE	LEI	LON	MAN	NEW	PLY	SHE	SUR
Bristol Flyers	—	71–93	78–73	91–85	75–71	79–78	86–76	87–77	68–55	78–60
Bristol Flyers	—	89–79	87–73	91–84	87–82	81–86	81–75	99–60	72–76	87–70
Caledonia Gladiators	76–88	—	117–96	89–81	60–84	92–83	81–77	91–76	77–60	88–70
Caledonia Gladiators	90–82	—	83–78	92–66	61–93	106–97	77–83	96–80	77–71	102–77
Cheshire Phoenix	74–81	78–61	—	91–105	74–89	103–99	80–77	71–78	49–62	90–61
Cheshire Phoenix	82–87	77–73	—	96–92	65–86	78–74	82–70	101–82	83–80	105–81
Leicester Riders	91–73	100–67	89–85	—	75–81	102–89	89–79	92–89	71–58	77–72
Leicester Riders	106–89	84–81	100–82	—	77–102	104–84	87–78	111–68	85–76	99–77
London Lions	95–60	95–87	75–60	89–78	—	91–83	100–69	87–63	75–63	88–62
London Lions	82–64	99–67	89–79	83–81	—	95–71	89–68	96–62	80–82	88–75
Manchester Giants	95–103	95–94	104–80	82–89	76–87	—	99–97	92–79	105–102	106–93
Manchester Giants	110–99	73–91	84–87	82–83	90–96	—	99–96	109–69	70–65	97–92
Newcastle Eagles	89–78	94–87	67–75	87–91	72–85	64–84	—	108–96	84–70	74–79
Newcastle Eagles	66–68	88–78	72–91	92–85	85–88	92–97	—	79–95	71–82	79–72
Plymouth City Patriots	70–96	93–85	67–90	79–101	79–88	103–96	98–93	—	69–88	91–68
Plymouth City Patriots	93–108	80–85	68–85	85–99	51–102	77–87	68–90	—	68–63	90–83
Sheffield Sharks	73–91	70–74	73–88	72–86	73–86	83–92	66–59	64–71	—	92–74
Sheffield Sharks	65–73	82–72	89–75	72–64	87–81	80–71	87–62	82–77	—	75–70
Surrey Scorchers	85–93	99–92	81–96	67–86	64–83	85–86	86–88	95–105	54–60	—
Surrey Scorchers	78–73	81–84	66–76	81–90	67–88	106–103	78–79	87–89	67–70	—

Updated to match(es) played on 23 April 2023. Source: BBL.org.uk
Legend: Blue = home team win; Red = away team win.

=== Ladder progression ===
Leader and qualification to playoffs
Qualification to playoffs
Last place

2022–23 BBL Championship
Team ╲ Round	1	2	3	4	5	6	7	8	9	10	11	12	13	14	15	16	17	18	19	20	21	22	23	24	25	26	27	28	29
Bristol Flyers	3	3	3	2	2	2	2	2	1	3	3	3	3	3	2	2	2	2	2	2	2	2	2	2	2	2	3	3	3
Caledonia Gladiators	—	—	6	8	7	8	8	8	8	6	7	5	4	5	6	6	6	5	5	4	4	5	4	5	5	5	4	4	4
Cheshire Phoenix	4	4	4	4	5	6	5	6	7	5	6	7	6	4	4	4	4	4	4	6	6	6	6	6	7	6	6	5	5
Leicester Riders	—	6	5	6	8	4	3	3	3	2	2	2	1	2	3	3	3	3	3	3	3	3	3	3	3	3	2	2	2
London Lions	1	2	1	1	1	1	1	1	2	1	1	1	2	1	1	1	1	1	1	1	1	1	1	1	1	1	1	1	1
Manchester Giants	5	1	2	3	3	3	4	4	5	7	8	8	8	7	5	5	5	6	6	5	5	4	5	4	4	4	5	7	6
Newcastle Eagles	—	8	10	10	9	9	9	9	9	9	9	9	9	9	9	9	9	9	9	9	9	9	9	9	9	9	9	9	8
Plymouth City Patriots	2	5	7	7	6	7	7	7	6	8	4	4	5	6	7	7	7	7	7	7	7	7	8	8	8	8	8	8	9
Sheffield Sharks	7	9	8	5	4	5	6	5	4	4	5	6	7	8	8	8	8	8	8	8	8	8	7	7	6	7	7	6	7
Surrey Scorchers	6	7	9	9	10	10	10	10	10	10	10	10	10	10	10	10	10	10	10	10	10	10	10	10	10	10	10	10	10

Updated to match(es) played on 23 April 2023. Source: BBL.org.uk

== BBL Cup ==
=== First round ===
2 October 2022	Caledonia Gladiators	81–72	Surrey Scorchers	Emirates Arena, Glasgow
17:00	Scoring by quarter: 23–15, 20–16, 19–24, 19–17
YouTube		boxscore report		Attendance: 200

9 October 2022	Plymouth City Patriots	75–77	Newcastle Eagles	Plymouth Pavilions, Plymouth
15:00	Scoring by quarter: 20–21, 19–22, 23–25, 13–9
YouTube		boxscore report		Attendance: n/a

=== Quarterfinals ===
25 November 2022	London Lions	74–65	Cheshire Phoenix	Copper Box Arena, London
20:00	Scoring by quarter: 25–14, 17–20, 21–13, 11–18
YouTube		boxscore report		Attendance: 1,500

26 November 2022	Bristol Flyers	95–76	Manchester Giants	SGS College Arena, Bristol
19:30	Scoring by quarter: 27–21, 25–18, 24–21, 19–16
YouTube		boxscore report		Attendance: 750

26 November 2022	Leicester Riders	94–73	Newcastle Eagles	Morningside Arena, Leicester
19:45	Scoring by quarter: 24–20, 25–17, 29–13, 16–23
Sky Sports		boxscore report		Attendance: n/a

27 November 2022	Sheffield Sharks	68–77	Caledonia Gladiators	Ponds Forge, Sheffield
16:00	Scoring by quarter: 17–26, 17–27, 12–17, 22–7
YouTube		boxscore report		Attendance: n/a

=== Semifinals ===
19 December 2022	Bristol Flyers	79–97	London Lions	SGS College Arena, Bristol
19:00	Scoring by quarter: 21–32, 15–20, 22–26, 21–19
YouTube		boxscore report		Attendance: 770

21 December 2022	Leicester Riders	89–68	Caledonia Gladiators	Morningside Arena, Leicester
19:45	Scoring by quarter: 30–13, 20–20, 16–23, 23–12
Sky Sports		boxscore report		Attendance: 666

=== Cup Final ===
29 January 2023	Leicester Riders	71–79	London Lions	Utilita Arena Birmingham, Birmingham
15:30	Scoring by quarter: 16–21, 16–20, 18–23, 21–15
Sky Sports	Pts: Dekker 22; Rebs: Koufos 12; Asts: Taylor 4	boxscore report	Pts: Jackson 16; Rebs: Nelson-Henry 11; Asts: MacKenzie, Whelan 4	Attendance: 10,000
Note: Cup MVP: Sam Dekker

== BBL Trophy ==
The BBL Trophy retained the same 16-team bracket format as introduced for the 2018–19 season. The ten BBL teams were drawn in the first round by six invited teams; St Mirren from the Scottish Basketball Championship, Basketball Wales, and Worthing Thunder, Derby Trailblazers, Nottingham Hoods and Thames Valley Cavaliers from the National Basketball League.

=== First round ===
7 January 2023	Plymouth City Patriots	105–52	St Mirren	Plymouth Pavilions, Plymouth
19:30	Scoring by quarter: 21–12, 26–20, 39–6, 19–14
YouTube		boxscore report		Attendance: n/a

12 January 2023	London Lions	89–53	Worthing Thunder	Copper Box Arena, London
19:30	Scoring by quarter: 17–9, 28–18, 22–15, 22–14
YouTube		boxscore report		Attendance: n/a

13 January 2023	Bristol Flyers	72–78	Surrey Scorchers	SGS College Arena, Bristol
19:30	Scoring by quarter: 26–11, 13–27, 13–22, 20–18
YouTube		boxscore report		Attendance: 770

13 January 2023	Caledonia Gladiators	97–86	Newcastle Eagles	Emirates Arena, Glasgow
19:30	Scoring by quarter: 25–22, 22–17, 25–22, 25–25
YouTube		boxscore report		Attendance: 500

13 January 2023	Derby Trailblazers	91–67	Basketball Wales	Clarence Wiggins Sports Centre, Derby
19:30	Scoring by quarter: 30–12, 23–20, 24–16, 14–19
YouTube		boxscore report		Attendance: n/a

15 January 2023	Sheffield Sharks	98–66	Thames Valley Cavaliers	Ponds Forge, Sheffield
16:00	Scoring by quarter: 35–13, 23–17, 15–17, 25–19
YouTube		boxscore report		Attendance: 450

15 January 2023	Manchester Giants	107–114(OT)	Leicester Riders	National Basketball Centre, Manchester
17:00	Scoring by quarter: 18–28, 28–22, 30–28, 23–21, Overtime: 8–15
YouTube		boxscore report		Attendance: 400

15 January 2023	Cheshire Phoenix	129–80	Nottingham Hoods	Cheshire Oaks Arena, Ellesmere Port
17:30	Scoring by quarter: 44–24, 30–21, 30–20, 25–15
YouTube		boxscore report		Attendance: n/a

=== Quarterfinals ===
10 February 2023	Caledonia Gladiators	52–50	London Lions	Emirates Arena, Glasgow
19:30	Scoring by quarter: 14–17, 17–9, 10–10, 11–14
YouTube		boxscore report		Attendance: 500

10 February 2023	Leicester Riders	78–79	Sheffield Sharks	Morningside Arena, Leicester
19:45	Scoring by quarter: 20–26, 24–13, 14–23, 20–17
Sky Sports		boxscore report		Attendance: n/a

11 February 2023	Surrey Scorchers	74–93	Cheshire Phoenix	Surrey Sports Park, Guildford
18:00	Scoring by quarter: 20–24, 28–20, 16–23, 10–26
YouTube		boxscore report		Attendance: 500

12 February 2023	Plymouth City Patriots	89–99	Derby Trailblazers	Plymouth Pavilions, Plymouth
15:00	Scoring by quarter: 20–31, 20–24, 28–19, 21–25
YouTube		boxscore report		Attendance: n/a

=== Semifinals ===
1 March 2023	Derby Trailblazers	65–83	Caledonia Gladiators	Clarence Wiggins Sports Centre, Derby
19:45	Scoring by quarter: 24–24, 12–16, 14–18, 15–25
Sky Sports		boxscore report		Attendance: n/a

5 March 2023	Cheshire Phoenix	82–78	Sheffield Sharks	Cheshire Oaks Arena, Ellesmere Port
17:30	Scoring by quarter: 18–27, 29–12, 11–22, 24–17
YouTube		boxscore report		Attendance: 1,200

=== Trophy Final ===
26 March 2023	Cheshire Phoenix	70–73	Caledonia Gladiators	Emirates Arena, Glasgow
15:30	Scoring by quarter: 19–18, 19–18, 18–21, 14–16
Sky Sports	Pts: Austin, Evans, Teague 12; Rebs: Austin 10; Asts: Evans 4	boxscore report	Pts: Bailey 16; Rebs: Alihodžić, Bailey 8 Asts: Onwas 6	Attendance: 6,000
Note: Trophy MVP: Jeremiah Bailey

== Playoffs ==
The quarterfinal matchups and tip-off times were confirmed by the league, on 23 April 2023. Each tie in the quarterfinals and semifinals phase are played over two legs.

=== Bracket ===
Quarterfinals
1	London Lions	108	99	207
8	Newcastle Eagles	78	86	164
4	Caledonia Gladiators	86	80	166
5	Cheshire Phoenix	102	84	186
2	Leicester Riders	79	74	153
7	Sheffield Sharks	70	70	140
3	Bristol Flyers	97	82	179
6	Manchester Giants	71	81	152

Semifinals
1	London Lions	82	102	184
5	Cheshire Phoenix	74	81	155
2	Leicester Riders	84	74	159
3	Bristol Flyers	77	79	156

Playoff Final
1	London Lions	88
2	Leicester Riders	80

*Note: Pairings are reseeded after quarterfinals.

=== Quarterfinals ===
Team 1	Agg.	Team 2	1st leg	2nd leg
London Lions	207–164	Newcastle Eagles	108–78	99–86
Leicester Riders	153–140	Sheffield Sharks	79–70	74–70
Bristol Flyers	179–152	Manchester Giants	97–71	82–81
Caledonia Gladiators	166–186	Cheshire Phoenix	86–102	80–84

==== (1) London Lions vs. (8) Newcastle Eagles ====
28 April 2023	Newcastle Eagles	78–108	London Lions	Vertu Motors Arena, Newcastle
19:30	Scoring by quarter: 16–31, 23–24, 20–27, 19–26
YouTube	Pts: Mockford 31; Rebs: Johnson 9 Asts: Cohn, Defoe, Gordon 5	boxscore report	Pts: Sharma 18; Rebs: Oni 8 Asts: Nelson, Taylor 5	Attendance: 2,214

1 May 2023	London Lions	99–86	Newcastle Eagles	Crystal Palace National Sports Centre, London
15:00	Scoring by quarter: 33–19, 18–27, 24–25, 24–15
YouTube	Pts: Sharma, Taylor 18; Rebs: Sharma 5 Asts: Nelson 7	boxscore report	Pts: Hamlet 24; Rebs: Johnson 11; Asts: Cohn, Johnson 5	Attendance: 1,039

==== (2) Leicester Riders vs. (7) Sheffield Sharks ====
28 April 2023	Sheffield Sharks	70–79	Leicester Riders	Ponds Forge, Sheffield
19:30	Scoring by quarter: 17–28, 16–15, 16–19, 21–17
YouTube	Pts: Koch 17; Rebs: Pipkins 8 Asts: Pipkins 6	boxscore report	Pts: Mackenzie 19; Rebs: Jackson, Loving 11; Asts: Love, Jackson, Mackenzie, Whelan 3	Attendance: 666

30 April 2023	Leicester Riders	74–70	Sheffield Sharks	Morningside Arena, Leicester
15:15	Scoring by quarter: 22–17, 20–17, 15–19, 17–17
Sky Sports	Pts: Jackson 25; Rebs: Nelson-Henry 11; Asts: Whelan 4	boxscore report	Pts: Ramsey 19; Rebs: Ratinho 7 Asts: Nelson 5	Attendance: 1,400

==== (3) Bristol Flyers vs. (6) Manchester Giants ====
27 April 2023	Manchester Giants	71–97	Bristol Flyers	National Basketball Performance Centre, Manchester
19:30	Scoring by quarter: 23–18, 17–20, 10–28, 21–31
YouTube	Pts: Lee 16; Rebs: Lee 8 Asts: Fletcher 6	boxscore report	Pts: Olison 29; Rebs: Delpeche 9 Asts: Miller 6	Attendance: 250

30 April 2023	Bristol Flyers	82–81	Manchester Giants	SGS College Arena, Bristol
16:00	Scoring by quarter: 26–18, 21–25, 19–20, 16–18
YouTube	Pts: Miller 17; Rebs: Miller 9 Asts: Olison 6	boxscore report	Pts: Fletcher, Roberson 19; Rebs: Roberson 11; Asts: Fletcher 6	Attendance: 770

==== (4) Caledonia Gladiators vs. (5) Cheshire Phoenix ====
28 April 2023	Cheshire Phoenix	102–86	Caledonia Gladiators	Cheshire Oaks Arena, Ellesmere Port
19:30	Scoring by quarter: 28–21, 25–27, 20–18, 29–20
YouTube	Pts: Archibald 35; Rebs: Ulph 9 Asts: Evans 8	boxscore report	Pts: Durham 23; Rebs: Alihodžić 14; Asts: Durham 7	Attendance: 200

29 April 2023	Caledonia Gladiators	80–84	Cheshire Phoenix	Emirates Arena, Glasgow
15:00	Scoring by quarter: 23–19, 16–21, 17–24, 24–20
YouTube	Pts: Durham 28; Rebs: Bailey 12; Asts: Bailey, Durham, Onwas 4	boxscore report	Pts: Evans 19; Rebs: Jack, Ulph 9 Asts: Austin Jr. 5	Attendance: 450

=== Semifinals ===
Team 1	Agg.	Team 2	1st leg	2nd leg
London Lions	184–155	Cheshire Phoenix	82–74	102–81
Leicester Riders	159–156	Bristol Flyers	84–77	75–79

==== (1) London Lions vs. (5) Cheshire Phoenix ====
7 May 2023	London Lions	82–74	Cheshire Phoenix	Crystal Palace National Sports Centre, London
14:30	Scoring by quarter: 19–24, 20–19, 28–18, 15–13
YouTube	Pts: Zubčić 15; Rebs: Sharma 9 Asts: Taylor 8	boxscore report	Pts: Archibald 24; Rebs: Ulph 11; Asts: Archibald 4	Attendance: 912

8 May 2023	Cheshire Phoenix	81–102	London Lions	Cheshire Oaks Arena, Ellesmere Port
18:00	Scoring by quarter: 16–26, 16–32, 27–23, 22–21
YouTube	Pts: Jack 34; Rebs: Ulph 8 Asts: Austin 7	boxscore report	Pts: Best, Sharma 16; Rebs: Best 7 Asts: Nelson, Soluade, Taylor 5	Attendance: n/a

==== (2) Leicester Riders vs. (3) Bristol Flyers ====
5 May 2023	Bristol Flyers	77–84	Leicester Riders	SGS College Arena, Bristol
19:30	Scoring by quarter: 11–26, 17–15, 25–23, 24–20
YouTube	Pts: King 23; Rebs: Delpeche 12; Asts: Delpeche, Miller 4	boxscore report	Pts: Mackenzie 14; Rebs: Jackson 8 Asts: Love 5	Attendance: 770

7 May 2023	Leicester Riders	75–79	Bristol Flyers	Morningside Arena, Leicester
17:15	Scoring by quarter: 21–18, 19–24, 14–22, 21–15
Sky Sports	Pts: Loving 18; Rebs: Jackson, Nelson-Henry 7 Asts: Love 7	boxscore report	Pts: Delpeche 23; Rebs: Bell 10; Asts: Miller 5	Attendance: 666

=== Playoff Final ===
==== (1) London Lions vs. (2) Leicester Riders ====
14 May 2023	London Lions	88–80	Leicester Riders	The O2 Arena, London
16:15	Scoring by quarter: 22–14, 22–22, 25–19, 19–25
Sky Sports	Pts: Best, Taylor 15; Rebs: Oni 10; Asts: Taylor 7	boxscore report	Pts: Jackson 20; Rebs: Jackson 9 Asts: Love 7	Attendance: 3,000

== Awards ==
- Most Valuable Player: Sam Dekker (London Lions)
- Play-off Final MVP: Jordan Taylor (London Lions)
- Coach of the Year: Ryan Schmidt (London Lions)

=== 2022–23 BBL Team of the Year ===
#	Player	Team
PG	David Sloan	Caledonia Gladiators
SG	Dirk Williams	Manchester Giants
SF	V. J. King	Bristol Flyers
PF	Sam Dekker	London Lions
C	Tajh Green	Manchester Giants

Source: 2022–23 Molten BBL Team of the Year

=== 2022–23 BBL All-British Team of the Year ===
#	Player	Team
PG	Jelani Watson-Gayle	Bristol Flyers
SG	Luke Nelson	London Lions
SF	Kimbal Mackenzie	Leicester Riders
PF	Patrick Whelan	Leicester Riders
C	Josh Sharma	London Lions

Source: 2022–23 BBL All-British Team of the Year

=== 2022–23 BBL Defensive Team of the Year ===
#	Player	Team
PG	Larry Austin Jr.	Cheshire Phoenix
SG	Anthony Roberson	Manchester Giants
SF	Prince Onwas	Caledonia Gladiators
PF	Jamell Anderson	Cheshire Phoenix
C	Josh Sharma	London Lions

Source: 2022–23 BBL Defensive Team of the Year

== British clubs in European competitions ==
Team	Competition	Progress
London Lions	EuroCup	Eighthfinals
Leicester Riders	Champions League	Qualifying round

Preceded by 2021–22 season	BBL seasons 2022–23	Succeeded by 2023–24 season
