= Aaron Best =

Aaron Best may refer to:

- Aaron Best (American football) (born 1978), American football player and coach
- Aaron Best (basketball) (born 1992), Canadian basketball player
