= WORQ =

Christian radio station in Green Bay, Wisconsin

Coordinates: 44.359°N 87.985°W

- Green Bay, Wisconsin; United States
- Frequency: 90.1 MHz
- Branding: Q90 FM

Programming
- Format: Christian radio (Contemporary music/talk)

Ownership
- Owner: Lakeshore Communications; (Lakeshore Communications, Inc.)

History
- First air date: February 1, 1994
- Call sign meaning: "We are On the Rock at the Q"

Technical information
- Licensing authority: FCC
- Facility ID: 36412
- Class: C2
- ERP: 11,000 watts
- HAAT: 197 meters (646 ft)

Links
- Public license information: Public file; LMS
- Webcast: Listen Live
- Website: www.q90fm.com

WORQ, known by the on-air brand of "Q90 FM", is a Christian radio radio station in Green Bay, Wisconsin. The station is owned and operated by Lakeshore Communications, and broadcasts at 90.1 MHz on the FM dial. WORQ is headquartered at 1253 Schuering Rd in suburban De Pere, with its transmitter located in the town of Ledgeview on Scray's Hill. The station is primarily known for its Christian music content (emphasizing contemporary Christian in its playlist), though its schedule also features local and syndicated programming that highlights Christian talk and teaching, along with discussion programming that emphasizes a conservative, evangelical viewpoint on current events.

The frequency had previously been home to WGBP-FM, a high school station at Our Lady of Premontre High School which broadcast with 10 watts from 1975 to 1990. The station was taken silent in 1991 when the Roman Catholic Diocese of Green Bay merged Premontre, St. Joseph Academy and Abbot Pennings High School into the new one-campus Notre Dame Academy and considered the radio station an extraneous asset. WORQ, originally assigned to 88.5, was moved to 90.1; it operates on a separate license and with a much more powerful transmitter. As of September 2001, the station was one of 29 radio stations whose plays were recorded by Radio & Records to compile the Christian CHR chart.

== Translators ==
In addition to the main station, WORQ is relayed by broadcast translators to the following parts of Wisconsin.

Call sign	Frequency	City of license	FID	ERP (W)	Class	FCC info
W281AV	104.1 FM	Sheboygan, Wisconsin	141117	38	D	LMS
W299BW	107.7 FM	Oshkosh, Wisconsin	140762	50	D	LMS
