= Olivia Harlan =

American sportscaster (born 1993)

- Born: April 8, 1993 (age 33)
- Other names: Olivia Dekker, Olivia Harlan-Dekker
- Education: University of Georgia
- Occupation: Sideline reporter
- Years active: 2013–present
- Height: 5 ft 8 in (173 cm)
- Spouse: Sam Dekker (m. 2018)
- Children: 2
- Father: Kevin Harlan

Olivia Harlan Dekker (born April 8, 1993) is an American sportscaster, working as a sideline reporter for ESPN College Football, the NFL on Westwood One Sports, and Big Ten Network basketball.

== Early life and education ==
Harlan grew up in Mission Hills, Kansas. Her father is play-by-play announcer Kevin Harlan. Her grandfather was former Green Bay Packers chief executive officer Bob Harlan. She was named Miss Kansas Teen USA in 2010. She graduated from the University of Georgia in 2014.

== Career ==
Harlan has covered SEC and ACC football for FOX Sports South and Raycom. She has co-hosted a daily Green Bay Packers training camp web series and worked as a sideline reporter for preseason games on Packers TV Network. She has been a sideline reporter for Atlanta Hawks games on FOX Sports South. With her father Kevin Harlan as play-by-play announcer and Olivia as sideline reporter, the Harlans became the first father-daughter duo to call an NFL game together. She joined ESPN in 2015. She covered World TeamTennis for CBS Sports in 2019. In 2020, she covered football games for the Big Ten Network. In 2021, she joined BetMGM as host. Harlan also works as a Sideline Reporter for the NFL Playoffs on Westwood One & Sky Sports UK (in the United Kingdom).

== Personal life ==
Harlan has three siblings. She is married to professional basketball player Sam Dekker, with whom she has a son. The couple was named 2018 People of the Year by The Sheboygan Press. She serves on the board of directors for the Children's Cancer Family Foundation.
