= WGBP-FM =

High school radio station in Green Bay, Wisconsin (1975–1990)

- Green Bay, Wisconsin; United States
- Frequency: 90.1 MHz

Programming
- Format: Variety

Ownership
- Owner: Our Lady of Premontre High School; (Premontre Board of Education)

History
- First air date: March 10, 1975
- Last air date: 1990
- Call sign meaning: Green Bay Premontre

Technical information
- Facility ID: 53403
- Class: D
- ERP: 10 watts
- Transmitter coordinates: 44°31′14.4″N 88°3′5.4″W

WGBP-FM was an FM high school radio station at Premontre High School in Green Bay, Wisconsin. The station operated on 90.1 MHz between 1975 and 1990.

== History ==
On November 30, 1973, Premontre High School applied to build and operate a 10-watt radio station from its campus at 610 Maryhill Drive in Green Bay. WGBP-FM signed on March 10, 1975, as the fourth high school radio station in the state. The impetus to start the station had come when students had heard of WSHS at Sheboygan North High School in Sheboygan and wanted to start up a facility; faculty advisors thought that, despite the paperwork burden, such an outlet would be useful. The station's program output during the school day included easy listening and rock music, plus news, weather, sports and public affairs programming.

WGBP quickly developed a deep tradition in sports broadcasting—one that would outlive the station itself. In its first full school year of operation, WGBP began carrying play-by-play of Premontre sports, quickly becoming the station's most popular program output. One of its first sports play-by-play announcers was a young Kevin Harlan, son of Packers executive Bob. After spending his freshman year doing studio work, Harlan began doing play-by-play of the school's football, basketball and hockey games as a sophomore, which included home and away broadcasts. After attending the University of Kansas and being named the lead radio announcer for the Kansas City Kings at the age of 22, making him the youngest announcer in the four major sports, Harlan called getting into radio at WGBP his "first good move". Another basketball announcer, Pete Pranica of the Memphis Grizzlies, also started his career in broadcasting at the station. Mark Daniels, who later went on to a lengthy career in Green Bay sports radio, was a senior at Premonte when WGBP started up and served as its first sports director.

In November 1989, the Roman Catholic Diocese of Green Bay announced a three-way merger that would combine Premontre with Abbot Pennings High School and St. Joseph Academy on Premontre's campus; the new Notre Dame Academy began operating in 1990, and the station was closed. Even if the station had been allowed to continue, the increasing power of other stations would have foreclosed its continued operation. In 1991, the Federal Communications Commission assigned 90.1 to a new radio station applicant, whose station signed on in 1994 as WORQ.
