= Kevin Harlan =

American sportscaster (born 1960)

- Born: Kevin Robert Harlan; June 21, 1960 (age 66); Milwaukee, Wisconsin, U.S.
- Education: University of Kansas
- Occupation: Television / Radio sports announcer
- Years active: 1982–present
- Spouse: Ann Harlan
- Children: 4, including Olivia
- Parent: Bob Harlan (father)
- Sports commentary career
- Genre: Play-by-play
- Sports: NBA; NFL; NCAA football; NCAA basketball

Kevin Robert Harlan (born June 21, 1960) is an American television and radio sports announcer, and a three-time National Sportscaster of the Year as voted by his peers. The son of former Green Bay Packers President and CEO Bob Harlan, he broadcasts NFL and college basketball games on CBS, as well as NBA games on Prime Video. He previously worked NBA games for TNT Sports from 1996 to 2025. The 2026 season will be his 42nd consecutive season doing NFL play-by-play, and 2026–27 will be his 40th year doing NBA play-by-play.

He has also been the lead NFL radio voice nationally for Westwood One and Monday Night Football since 2009. On that platform, he has broadcast 16 consecutive Super Bowls, the most in radio or television history. Overall, he is third all time in the total number of network television sports broadcasts for which he has done play-by-play calling for one of the four major sports in the U.S. Harlan has also broadcast more than 500 NFL games on network TV, putting him in the top 10 all time, joining names like Al Michaels and Pat Summerall, for play-by-play.

Until 2008, Harlan was the voice of Westwood One Radio's Final Four coverage of the NCAA Division I men's basketball tournament. In 2009, he began serving as Westwood One's lead announcer for Monday Night Football, calling his first Super Bowl in Super Bowl XLV. Super Bowl LX was his 16th consecutive Super Bowl for Westwood One (Super Bowls XLV–LX), the most consecutively in radio and television network history. Harlan also broadcast the CBS HD feed of Super Bowl XXXV in 2001. He also calls the preseason games of his hometown Green Bay Packers for the team's statewide television network since 2003. He is one of three broadcasters to have more than 3,000 career national TV network broadcasts of the four major professional sports, along with Dick Stockton and Marv Albert. He has broadcast the most NBA games for TNT in his 30 years with the network. He has been with Westwood One for over two decades.

== Biography ==
Harlan began broadcasting as a teenager for his alma mater Our Lady of Premontre High School's high school radio station, WGBP-FM, calling play-by-play for the school's boys' basketball, football and ice hockey teams. He was inducted into the school's Hall of Fame in 2019. He was a ball boy with the Green Bay Packers in his teens during the time that his father, Bob Harlan, was a Packers executive in the front office. He had originally pursued attending either the University of Wisconsin–Madison or the University of Notre Dame in pursuit of his communications/mass media degree, but a personal recommendation from broadcaster Gary Bender to his dad Bob led Kevin to instead attend the University of Kansas and its School of Journalism and Mass Communications. Harlan was introduced to the Jayhawks' primary basketball play-by-play announcer at the time, Tom Hedrick, who noted Harlan's zeal for sports broadcasting and immediately considered him a protégé in the making. Hedrick gave Harlan a sideline position his freshman year, eventually deeming him as his understudy and fill-in announcer on days when he had other commitments. Harlan graduated in 1982 with a broadcast journalism degree. During his time in Kansas, he was a member of the Sigma Chi fraternity.

In 1982, right out of college, at age 22, Harlan became the TV and radio voice of the NBA's Kansas City Kings (now the Sacramento Kings). He was then a basketball announcer for his alma mater, the University of Kansas, for one year, then went on to call games for the NFL's Kansas City Chiefs from 1985 to 1993 after several years hosting and producing surrounding pre-game and post-game programming while still in college. Harlan also split time with the University of Missouri (1986–89) calling football and basketball games and worked as the play-by-play voice of the NBA's Minnesota Timberwolves for nine seasons (1989–98). On the network level, Harlan called NFL football for NBC in 1991, college football for ESPN in 1992–93, NFL for Fox from 1994 to 1997 and joined Turner Sports in 1996 to broadcast NBA playoff games (he would begin calling games throughout the entire season in 1997, which he continues to do to this day). Harlan broadcast his first NBA All Star game for TNT in 2022, as well as the Western and Eastern Conference Finals. He has been the longest running NBA play by play announcer for TNT in their 39-year history broadcasting the NBA. He has broadcast more NBA games for TNT than any other announcer. He began working for CBS in 1998 after four years at FOX. Following TNT's loss of NBA rights, Harlan joined Prime Video.

In addition, Harlan has called Jacksonville Jaguars, Chicago Bears, and Green Bay Packers preseason games; boxing for Mike Tyson vs. Buster Mathis Jr. in 1995; basketball games during the now-defunct Goodwill Games, which were owned by Time Warner; college sports on ESPN; and several bowl games during college football seasons. Harlan has also lent his voice on the NBA 2K video game series since 2005.

In 2017, Harlan was voted by his peers as National Sportscaster of the Year by the NSMA. He again was voted National Sportscaster of the Year by the NSMA in 2019. He was also named 2019 National Sportscaster of the Year by The Athletic. In September 2019, Harlan was inducted into the Notre Dame Academy High School Hall of Fame (the former Premontre HS he attended in Green Bay, Wisconsin). He was again voted National Sportscaster of the Year in 2023.

== Notable calls ==
Harlan has a history of injecting humor into situations during games whenever he can, in addition to being able to dramatize even mundane moments not related to the game itself.

=== Basketball ===
March 13, 1999 - Working his first NCAA Tournament for CBS, Harlan was assigned first and second round games in the West Region, played in Seattle. Assigned to the region was then unknown Gonzaga University, a 10-seed. After upsetting Stanford, a 2-seed, in the second round, he exclaimed:

"For little Gonzaga University, dreams do come true!"

May 12, 2008 – Harlan was the play-by-play announcer for TNT's coverage of the NBA second-round playoff game between the Cleveland Cavaliers and the Boston Celtics. Boston led the series 2–1, and Cleveland was leading game four 82–75, when LeBron James drove the lane and finished with a vicious dunk, leading Harlan to exclaim:

"LeBron James with no regard for human life!"

December 16, 2010 – Harlan called the game between the San Antonio Spurs and the Denver Nuggets on TNT. With about a second left into the first period, J. R. Smith ran with a two-handed dunk above Gary Neal and hanged from the rim; in the moment, Harlan exclaimed:

"J. R. Smith! We just saw a man fly! Ride em', cowboy! What a play!"

May 12, 2019 - Harlan was the play-by-play announcer for TNT's coverage of Game 7 of the NBA Eastern Conference semifinals between the Philadelphia 76ers and the Toronto Raptors. The game was tied at 90, and Toronto had possession with 4.2 seconds left. Kawhi Leonard received the ball and shot a dramatic buzzer beater that bounced off the rim four times before dropping in, winning the game and the series for Toronto. When the ball fell through the rim, Harlan yelled, “OHHHH!”, in disbelief. It was the first ever (and, as of July 2026, the only) Game 7 series-ending buzzer beater in NBA history.

It's off to Leonard, defended by Simmons... is this the dagger? (Pause as the ball bounces four times before going in) Game! Series! Toronto has won!

March 16, 2023 - During the 2023 NCAA Division I men's basketball tournament Harlan was on the call, along with Dan Bonner and Stan Van Gundy when #13 Furman scored a go-ahead 3-pointer over #4 Virginia in the Round of 64 with 2.2 seconds to go due to a rogue pass from Virginia's Kihei Clark to Furman's Garrett Hien. Furman would win the game 68–67, giving them a win in their first tournament game since 1980. Video of Harlan making the call later went viral.

"Clark in a straight-jacket-- He threw it away! (Bonner: "Oh, he didn't mean to do that!") He threw it away! Hien, [JP] Pegues! Good! Furman leads! Timeout, Virginia! (long pause) Did we just see what we think we just saw? Wow!

May 12, 2024 - During Game 4 of the second round playoff series between the Denver Nuggets and the Minnesota Timberwolves Harlan made a call just as the halftime buzzer was sounding. The play resulted from a quick inbound attempt by a Minnesota player from underneath his basket with 1.6 seconds remaining on the clock. Jamal Murray of the Nuggets stepped in front of the pass for the steal and attempted a buzzer beater from about 10 feet beyond the half court line, right near the sideline where Harlan and his analyst Reggie Miller were seated. The shot's high angle allowed Harlan enough time to make a call that quickly went viral along with Murray's reaction to Harlan's call. The call was:

"That's intercepted. Murray, good if it goes... Got it! Got it! Got it! A big-time three! Oh, what a shot!"

As Harlan repeatedly yelled "Got it" he stood up from his seat and leaned toward the court where Jamal Murray had turned to hear the call with a look of fierce determination. They stared at each other from just across the announcer's table as Harlan finished the call until Murray's teammates took him away to celebrate the play. The video of the shot, stare-down, and call quickly became a major sensation on television and social media.

=== Football ===
September 12, 2016 – Harlan was the radio play-by-play man for Westwood One's coverage of the Monday Night Football game between the San Francisco 49ers and the Los Angeles Rams, where a fan ran onto the field. Harlan then proceeded to give a play-by-play of security chasing the man. Deadspin referred to the call as an "All Timer".

"Hey, somebody has run out on the field. Some goofball in a hat and a red shirt. Now he takes off the shirt! He’s running down the middle by the 50, he’s at the 30! He’s bare-chested and... BANGING HIS CHEST?! Now he runs the opposite way! He runs to the 50, he runs to the 40, the guy is DRUNK! But there he goes! The 20 — they’re chasing him, but they’re not going to get him! Waving his arms, bare-chested; Somebody stop that man! [Referring to the security] Oh, they got him, they’re coming from the left — Oh, and they tackle him at the 40-yard line! [Pause] Whew, that was the most exciting thing to happen tonight."

February 4, 2018 - Harlan called Super Bowl LII on the radio for Westwood One when, with just moments left in the second quarter, the Philadelphia Eagles ran a trick play, now known as the Philly Special.

"It's a direct snap it goes to Clement who gives it off to ... Burton the tight end who then throws in the end zone. Touchdown! Foles caught the ball on a touchdown pass of a yard by the tight end! What did we just see?! Holy smokes! Thirty-four seconds to go the tight end just threw a touchdown pass to the quarterback."

November 4, 2019 – Harlan was the radio play-by-play for Westwood One's coverage of a Monday Night Football game between the Dallas Cowboys and New York Giants where a black cat ran onto the field midway in the second quarter.

"Oh, there's a cat, a black cat has taken the field. A black cat is running from the 20 to the nearside, the 10, from the 39 of Dallas here is a short throw down the middle caught by Engram. Caught at the 35 to the 30, now the cat running the other way and so is Engram at the 25 near the 24 yard line of the Dallas Cowboys. It's a catch-run of 15. Now the cat is stopped at the 50. (Kurt Warner: So is it bad luck for the Giants, or bad luck for the Cowboys?) I don't know, I don't know but they've stopped play, and the players with hands on hips are watching the cat run and zig zag all over the field. The black cat is on the other end of the field. He's at the eight! (Warner: The cat doesn't know that it was last Thursday that was Halloween, Thursday Night Football, not Monday Night Football.) He's a little bit late. (Warner chuckles) Now he is sitting, and looking, now he's at the five... (Warner: Who brought the cat?) He's walking to the three, he's at the two... and the cat is in the CDW Red Zone, CDW, people who get it- Now a policeman, state troopers come on the field- And the cat runs into the endzone! That is a touchdown! And the cat is elusive, kind of like Barkley and Elliott, but he didn’t know where to go! Look at it, they're trying to corner him, and they got him in the end zone. There are state troopers all around this cat which now climbs up into the stands, and the fans are running for their li- Now it goes back on the field again and it's running in the back of the end zone, and it runs up the tunnel.”

November 10, 2019 – The following Sunday, Harlan was the play-by-play announcer for a game between the Baltimore Ravens and Cincinnati Bengals. With Baltimore up 28–10 against Cincinnati, Ravens quarterback and MVP favorite Lamar Jackson used a spin move to elude several Bengals defenders for a 47-yard touchdown run in the third quarter, putting the game out of reach.

"Here's a second down and 3, Jackson takes it himself. Look at him dart back and forth... He broke his ankles, now he's got an entourage! And he's got a touchdown! He is Houdini! What a play! 47-yard touchdown run by the magical quarterback Lamar Jackson! Wow!"

December 29, 2019 – Harlan was the television play-by-play commentator for the Los Angeles Chargers at the Kansas City Chiefs when he began calling the Miami Dolphins at the New England Patriots game in the Chargers vs Chiefs feed; with the Chiefs win and a New England loss, the Chiefs would claim a first-round bye as the #2 seed in the playoffs.

Meanwhile, Miami has first and goal down by four. And they're at the New England four yard line, first and goal. 29 seconds left. Here (in Kansas City) Butker kicks the extra point. And Fitzpatrick throws in the end zone, touchdown Miami! The Dolphins have just scored! Gesicki, the tight end, got a laser in the back of the end zone on a goal-to-go touchdown pass by Miami quarterback Ryan Fitzpatrick to take a lead with 24 seconds to go! The extra point coming up for Miami, leading New England 26 to 24. And the crowd (in Kansas City) now knows it. ... What a throw by Fitzpatrick, what a touchdown run by Williams, on the last weekend of the regular season in the NFL! If the Chiefs win and New England loses, the Chiefs will be the 2 seed. They'll get the bye, and they'll have a home game the next weekend.

Rich Gannon, the analyst in the booth with Harlan, asked Harlan "I'm getting confused, what game are you calling?", to which Harlan responded with a very enthusiastic "I'M CALLING BOTH GAMES!" In response to Gannon's joke that CBS should give Harlan two paychecks for the week, Harlan quipped, "I'm probably breaking every FCC rule in the book!"

February 7, 2021 – During Super Bowl LV between the Kansas City Chiefs and the Tampa Bay Buccaneers, Harlan was the radio play-by-play announcer when, in the closing minutes of the game, a streaker ran onto the field. The streaker was a man dressed in an undersized women's pink one-piece thong-style swimsuit and a pair of dark athletic shorts.

"Someone has run on the field... some guy with a bra! And now, he's not being chased he's running down the middle the 40. Arms in the air in a victory salute. He's pulling down his pants. Put up your pants, my man! Pull up your pants! He's being chased to the 30, he breaks a tackle from a security guard, the 20, down the middle the ten, the five, he slides at the one... and they converge on him at the goal line! (pause) Pull up your pants, take off the bra and be a man! And the players with hands on hips at the other end of the field are looking at him and shaking their head, and saying, 'Why, oh, why is this taking place in a Super Bowl?'"

October 6, 2024 - During Week 5 of the 2024 NFL season, the Baltimore Ravens were facing the Cincinnati Bengals. Trailing 38–28 with 5:38 in the 4th quarter, the Ravens were at the 6 yard line of the Bengals with 2nd & Goal. Quarterback Lamar Jackson initially bobble the snap from his center before picking it up and being chased by Bengals defensive end Sam Hubbard. Jackson stiff-armed Hubbard and before being shoved out of bounds by linebackber Germaine Pratt, Jackson threw the ball to the end zone where it was caught by tight end Isaiah Likely.

"Justice Hill is the [running back]. Likely in motion, he bobbles it! Scoops it in, vacuums it home. Here comes Hubbard! Oh, he threw him away like a rag doll. And he throws in the end zone..Caught! Caught for a touchdown! Caught for a touchdown by Likely! Absolutely amazing! How in the world did he keep it together and then find the open receiver?! Oh, Lamar Jackson!"

== Personal life ==
Harlan has been married to his wife Ann for 39 years, and together they have four children and seven grandchildren. Their daughter, Olivia, was a sideline reporter for ESPN, and now SkySports, throughout Europe. She is married to former NBA player Sam Dekker, who plays pro basketball in Barcelona and in the EuroLeague.

== Play-by-play roles ==
Minnesota Timberwolves

- Lead broadcaster (1989–1998)

CBS Sports

- NFL on CBS (1998–present), secondary broadcaster
- NCAA Basketball (1998–present), secondary broadcaster

NBC Sports

- NBA on NBC (1993), secondary broadcaster

Fox Sports

- NFL on Fox (1994–1997), secondary broadcaster

Sports on Amazon Prime Video

- NBA on Prime Video (2025–present), co-lead broadcaster

TNT Sports

- NBA on TNT (1996-2025), secondary and lead broadcaster

Preceded by Marv Albert	Monday Night Football national radio play-by-play announcer 2010–present	Succeeded by Incumbent
