= Kosta Koufos =

Greek-American basketball player (born 1989)

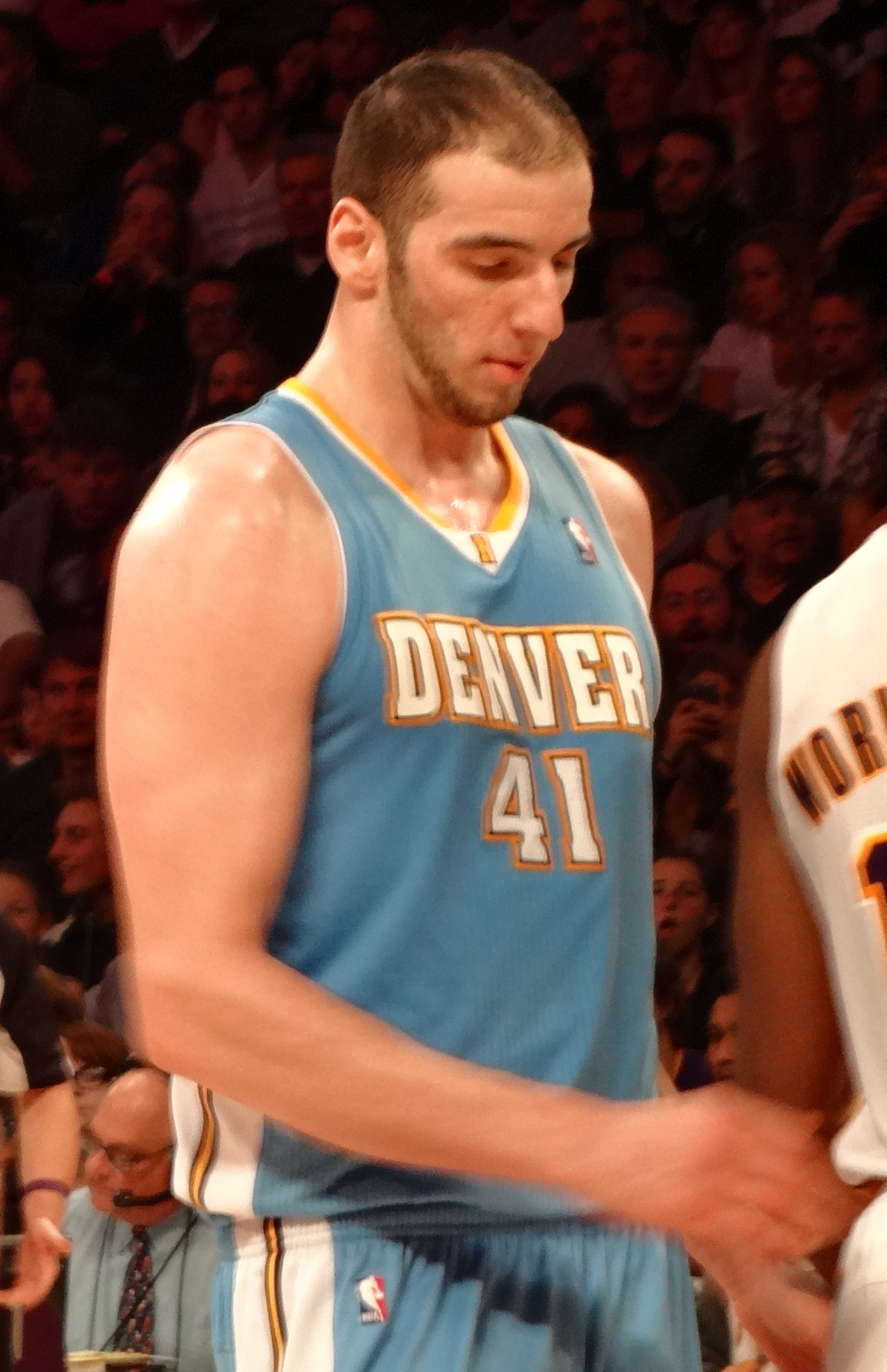
- Koufos with the Denver Nuggets in 2013

Personal information
- Born: February 24, 1989 (age 37) Canton, Ohio, U.S.
- Listed height: 7 ft 0 in (2.13 m)
- Listed weight: 275 lb (125 kg)

Career information
- High school: GlenOak (Canton, Ohio)
- College: Ohio State (2007–2008)
- NBA draft: 2008: 1st round, 23rd overall pick
- Drafted by: Utah Jazz
- Playing career: 2008–2023
- Position: Center
- Number: 41, 31

Career history
- 2008–2010: Utah Jazz
- 2009–2010: →Utah Flash
- 2010–2011: Minnesota Timberwolves
- 2011–2013: Denver Nuggets
- 2013–2015: Memphis Grizzlies
- 2015–2019: Sacramento Kings
- 2019–2020: CSKA Moscow
- 2021: Olympiacos
- 2021: NBA G League Ignite
- 2022–2023: London Lions

Career highlights
- Third-team All-Big Ten (2008); Big Ten All-Freshman Team (2008); National Invitation Tournament MVP (2008); FIBA U18 European Championship MVP (2007); McDonald's All-American (2007); Third-team Parade All-American (2007)
- Stats at NBA.com
- Stats at Basketball Reference
Medals
Men's basketball
Representing Greece
EuroBasket
Bronze medal – third place	2009 Poland
FIBA Under-18 European Championship
Silver medal – second place	2007 Spain	Team

Konstantine Demetrios "Kosta" Koufos (Greek: Κωνσταντίνος Δημήτριος "Κώστας" Κουφός; born February 24, 1989) is a Greek-American former professional basketball player. He played one season at Ohio State before being selected by the Utah Jazz with the 23rd overall pick in the 2008 NBA draft.

== High school career ==
Koufos attended GlenOak High School in Canton, Ohio, where he played center for the GlenOak Golden Eagles high school basketball team. As a junior, Koufos averaged 24 points per game, 11.1 rebounds per game, and four blocked shots per game and he was named Second-Team All-State.

As a senior, Koufos averaged 25.9 points per game, 15.4 rebounds per game and 5.2 blocked shots per game. He was instrumental in GlenOak snapping Canton McKinley's 41-game win streak in January 2007, when he posted 32 points, 19 rebounds and 10 blocks to help the Golden Eagles edge the Bulldogs, 56–55, in overtime. The next day, Koufos recorded 32 points, 15 rebounds and seven blocks against Detroit Country Day, to lead GlenOak to its ninth consecutive victory.

Koufos finished second to future Buckeye teammate Jon Diebler in the Mr. Ohio Basketball voting. After his senior season with GlenOak, Koufos was named the Division I player of the year and was also named First-Team All-State. He also earned First-Team Northeast Inland All-District and third-team Parade All-American honors and participated in the 2007 McDonald's All-American Game and 2007 Jordan Brand Classic.

Considered a five-star recruit by Rivals.com, Koufos was listed as the No. 3 center and the No. 16 player in the nation in 2007.

== College career ==
Koufos played one season of college basketball for the Ohio State Buckeyes. For the 2007–08 season, he was named third-team All-Big Ten and was named to the league's All-Freshman Team. He ranked fifth in the Big Ten in scoring (14.4 ppg) and rebounding (6.7 rpg), and ranked second in blocked shots (1.8 bpg) and seventh in field goal percentage (.508). He helped the Buckeyes reach the final of the National Invitation Tournament, where they won 92–85 over UMass behind Koufos' 22 points, nine rebounds and three blocked shots. He was subsequently named NIT Most Valuable Player. He declared for the 2008 NBA draft following his freshman season.

== Professional career ==
=== Utah Jazz (2008–2010) ===
Koufos was selected by the Utah Jazz with the 23rd overall pick in the 2008 NBA draft. During his rookie season, he spent time in the NBA D-League on assignment with the Utah Flash. He went on to receive two assignments to the Flash during the 2009–10 season. In two seasons with the Jazz, Koufos played in 84 games and averaged 3.3 points and 2.2 rebounds.

=== Minnesota Timberwolves (2010–2011) ===
On July 13, 2010, Koufos was traded, alongside two future first-round draft picks, to the Minnesota Timberwolves in exchange for Al Jefferson.

=== Denver Nuggets (2011–2013) ===
On February 22, 2011, Koufos was acquired by the Denver Nuggets in a three-way trade involving the Timberwolves and the New York Knicks. On January 25, 2012, he signed a three-year, $9 million contract extension with the Nuggets. He averaged career-best figures in Denver, with 6.9 points and 6.1 rebounds per game.

=== Memphis Grizzlies (2013–2015) ===
On June 27, 2013, Koufos was traded to the Memphis Grizzlies in exchange for Darrell Arthur and the draft rights to Joffrey Lauvergne. In two seasons with Memphis, he averaged 5.8 points and 5.2 rebounds per game.

=== Sacramento Kings (2015–2019) ===
On July 13, 2015, Koufos signed with the Sacramento Kings. On June 30, 2019, Koufos became an unrestricted free agent.

=== CSKA Moscow (2019–2020) ===
On July 19, 2019, Koufos signed a two-year deal with CSKA Moscow of the VTB United League and the EuroLeague. He averaged 3.7 points and 2.8 rebounds per game. On May 27, 2020, the team opted out of the contract.

=== Olympiacos (2021) ===
On February 20, 2021, Koufos signed with Olympiacos of the Greek Basket League and the EuroLeague until the end of the 2020–21 season.

=== NBA G League Ignite (2021) ===
On November 5, 2021, Koufos signed with the NBA G League Ignite of the NBA G League.

=== London Lions (2022–2023) ===
On July 13, 2022, Koufos signed with the London Lions for the 2022–23 BBL season. On April 20, 2023, Koufos and the Lions parted ways.

== National team career ==
=== Greek junior team ===
Koufos was a member of the junior Greek national under-18 team at the 2007 FIBA Europe Under-18 Championship in Spain. He led his team to the tournament's final game, and although Greece lost in the finals to Serbia's under-18 team, Koufos won the tournament's MVP award, after leading the competition in points, rebounds and blocked shots, with averages of 26.5 points, 13.0 rebounds and 3.5 blocks per game.

=== Greek senior team ===
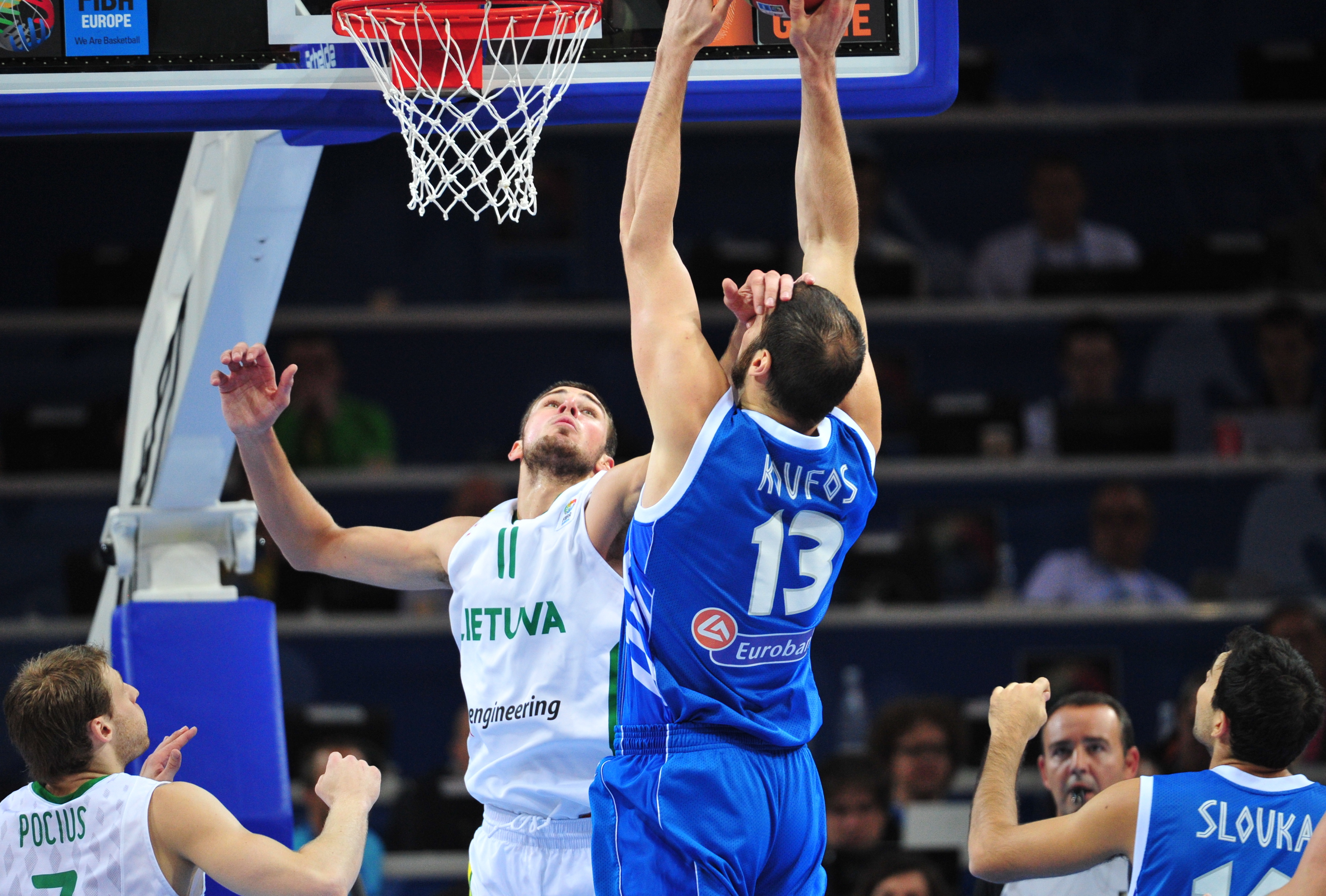
Koufos playing with Greece against Lithuania's Jonas Valančiūnas (2011)

In 2009, Koufos debuted with the senior Greek national basketball team, and he competed at the EuroBasket 2009, where he won a bronze medal. During the EuroBasket 2009 tournament, he averaged 5.6 points and 3.0 rebounds per game. He also played at the EuroBasket 2011, where he averaged 8.7 points and 3.7 rebounds per game. Koufos also competed at the EuroBasket 2015, where he had his best tournament with the senior Greek national basketball team, as he averaged 10 points and 6.6 rebounds per game, in 8 games played.

He also played with Greece at the 2016 Turin FIBA World Olympic Qualifying Tournament, where he averaged 7.0 points and 3.3 rebounds per game.

From 2009 to 2016, Koufos appeared in a total of 57 games, scoring 503 points (an average of 8.8 points per game).

== Personal life ==
Koufos is the son of Greek immigrants Katerina and Alex Koufos, a pediatric doctor in Canton who died when Kosta was nine years old. Koufos holds dual citizenship of both the United States and Greece, thus making him eligible to represent Greece internationally. He can speak Greek.

== Awards and accomplishments ==
- 2007 FIBA Europe Under-18 Championship: Silver
- 2007 FIBA Europe Under-18 Championship: MVP
- 2008 National Invitation Tournament: MVP
- EuroBasket 2009: Bronze

== Career statistics ==
Legend
GP	Games played	GS	Games started	MPG	Minutes per game
FG%	Field goal percentage	3P%	3-point field goal percentage	FT%	Free throw percentage
RPG	Rebounds per game	APG	Assists per game	SPG	Steals per game
BPG	Blocks per game	PPG	Points per game	**Bold**	Career high

=== Regular season ===
Year	Team	GP	GS	MPG	FG%	3P%	FT%	RPG	APG	SPG	BPG	PPG
2008–09	Utah	48	7	11.8	.508	.000	**.706**	2.9	.4	.3	.6	4.7
2009–10	Utah	36	0	4.8	.468	.000	.600	1.3	.2	.1	.1	1.5
2010–11	Minnesota	39	1	8.6	.435	.000	.500	2.5	.2	.2	.5	2.7
2010–11	Denver	11	1	8.9	.500	.000	.632	3.0	.0	.2	.5	4.9
2011–12	Denver	48	24	16.5	**.599**	.000	.600	5.4	.3	.5	.9	5.5
2012–13	Denver	**81**	**81**	**22.4**	.581	.000	.558	**6.9**	.4	.5	**1.3**	**8.0**
2013–14	Memphis	80	22	16.9	.495	.000	.645	5.2	.5	.4	.9	6.4
2014–15	Memphis	**81**	3	16.6	.508	.000	.647	5.3	.5	.4	.8	5.2
2015–16	Sacramento	78	14	19.0	.532	.000	.548	5.4	.4	.5	.9	6.8
2016–17	Sacramento	71	62	20.0	.551	.000	.613	5.7	.7	.5	.7	6.6
2017–18	Sacramento	71	12	19.6	.571	.000	.446	6.6	**1.2**	**.7**	.5	6.7
2018–19	Sacramento	42	1	12.0	.477	.000	.417	4.2	.9	.4	.4	3.7
Career		686	228	16.4	.534	.000	.582	5.0	.5	.7	.4	5.7

=== Playoffs ===
Year	Team	GP	GS	MPG	FG%	3P%	FT%	RPG	APG	SPG	BPG	PPG
2010	Utah	9	0	3.4	.400	.000	.000	1.0	.0	.0	.1	.9
2011	Denver	1	0	2.0	**1.000**	.000	.000	.0	.0	.0	.0	2.0
2012	Denver	3	**2**	8.7	.333	.000	.000	**3.7**	.0	.0	.3	.7
2013	Denver	6	**2**	**16.7**	.368	**1.000**	.833	3.5	**.5**	**.5**	**.7**	3.3
2014	Memphis	7	0	6.4	.438	.000	**1.000**	2.1	.3	.3	.4	2.6
2015	Memphis	**11**	0	11.5	.540	.000	.600	3.5	.4	.4	.5	**3.4**
Career		37	4	8.9	.460	1.000	.800	2.6	.2	.2	.4	2.4

=== EuroLeague ===
Year	Team	GP	GS	MPG	FG%	3P%	FT%	RPG	APG	SPG	BPG	PPG	PIR
2019–20	CSKA Moscow	17	1	9.3	.547	–	.556	2.8	0.2	0.5	0.2	3.7	4.7
2020–21	Olympiacos	8	5	10.1	.529	–	.200	2.3	0.8	0.0	0.5	4.6	–

=== College ===
Year	Team	GP	GS	MPG	FG%	3P%	FT%	RPG	APG	SPG	BPG	PPG
2007–08	Ohio State	37	35	27.1	.508	.349	.680	6.7	.5	.4	1.8	14.4

== See also ==
- List of European basketball players in the United States
