= Sam Dekker =

American basketball player (born 1994)

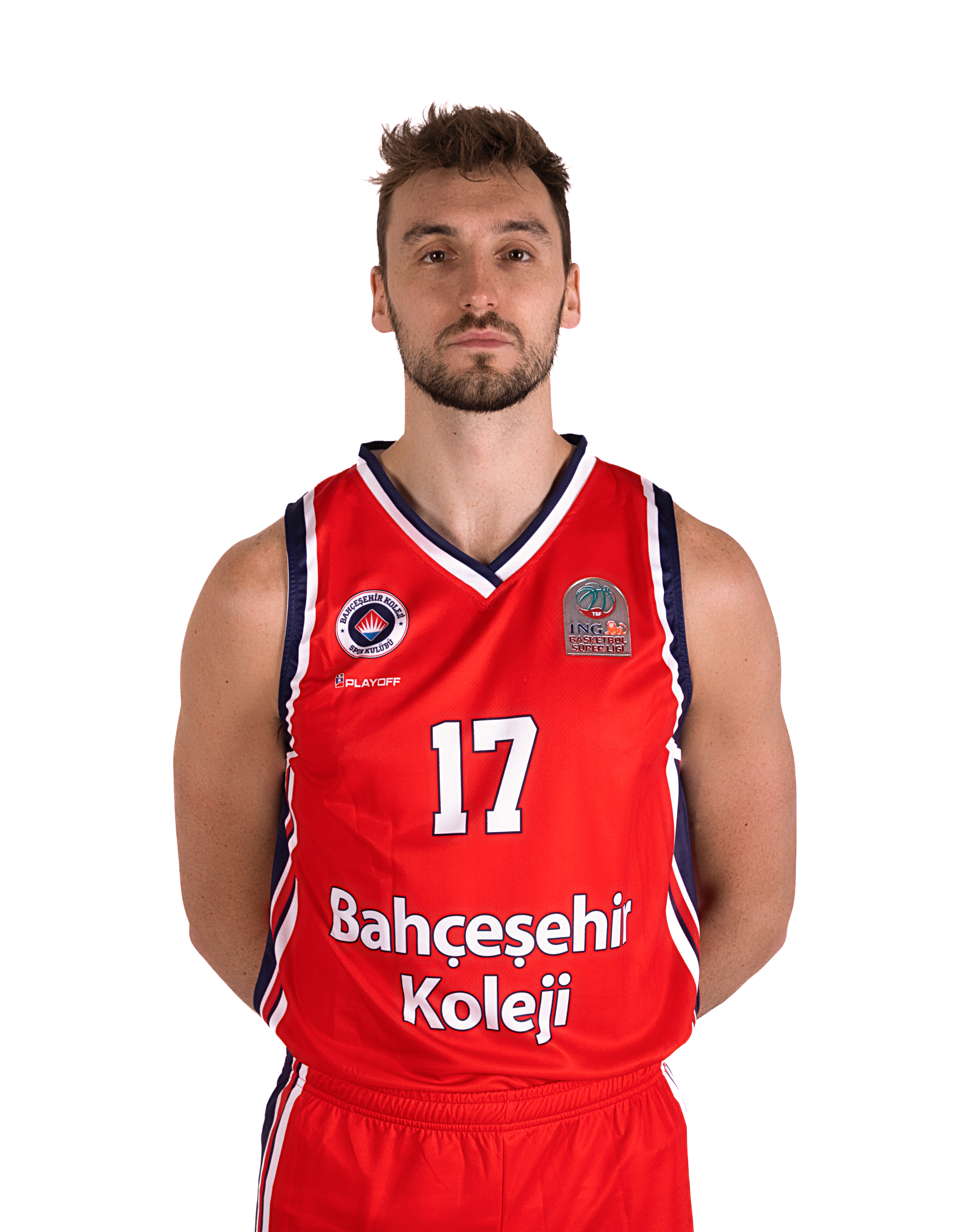
- Dekker with Bahçeşehir Koleji in 2022

South Carolina Gamecocks
- Title: Assistant coach
- League: Southeastern Conference

Personal information
- Born: May 6, 1994 (age 32) Sheboygan, Wisconsin, U.S.
- Listed height: 6 ft 8 in (2.03 m)
- Listed weight: 219 lb (99 kg)

Career information
- High school: Sheboygan Lutheran (Sheboygan, Wisconsin)
- College: Wisconsin (2012–2015)
- NBA draft: 2015: 1st round, 18th overall pick
- Drafted by: Houston Rockets
- Playing career: 2015–2026
- Position: Small forward / power forward
- Number: 7, 8, 1, 17
- Coaching career: 2026–present

Career history

Playing
- 2015–2017: Houston Rockets
- 2016: →Rio Grande Valley Vipers
- 2017–2018: Los Angeles Clippers
- 2018: Cleveland Cavaliers
- 2018–2019: Washington Wizards
- 2019–2020: Lokomotiv Kuban
- 2020–2021: Türk Telekom
- 2021: Toronto Raptors
- 2021–2022: Bahçeşehir Koleji
- 2022–2024: London Lions
- 2024–2026: Joventut Badalona

Coaching
- 2026–present: South Carolina (assistant)

Career highlights
- As player: All-EuroCup Second Team (2023); FIBA Europe Cup champion (2022); 2× BBL champion (2023, 2024); BBL Final MVP (2024); BBL MVP (2023); BBL Team of the Year (2023); BBL Cup winner (2023); BBL Cup Final MVP (2023); 2× Second-team All-Big Ten (2014, 2015); Big Ten All-Freshman team (2013); First-team Parade All-American (2012); Wisconsin Mr. Basketball (2012)
- Stats at NBA.com
- Stats at Basketball Reference
Medals
Men's basketball
Representing the United States
FIBA Americas U18 Championship
Gold medal – first place	2012 Brazil	Team

Samuel Thomas Dekker (born May 6, 1994) is an American college basketball coach and former professional player who currently serves as an assistant men’s basketball coach for the South Carolina Gamecocks of the Southeastern Conference (SEC). Dekker played college basketball for the Wisconsin Badgers. After finishing college on a championship game run in the 2015 NCAA Tournament, Dekker was selected by the Houston Rockets with the 18th overall pick in the 2015 NBA draft.

== High school career ==
Dekker was named the Wisconsin Gatorade Player of the Year following his senior season. He was also named 2012 Parade All-American, AP first-team all-state and Wisconsin Basketball Coaches' Association's Mr. Basketball award. He led Sheboygan Lutheran to the school's first-ever WIAA state title. Dekker scored 40 points, including the last 12, in the state title game including the game-winning three-point shot with two seconds left.

College recruiting
Name	Hometown	School	Height	Weight	Commit date
Sam Dekker; SF	Sheboygan, WI	Sheboygan Lutheran	6 ft 7 in (2.01 m)	195 lb (88 kg)	Jun 15, 2010
Sam Dekker; SF	Recruit ratings: Scout: Rivals: 247Sports: ESPN:				
Overall recruit ranking: Scout: 4 (SF) Rivals: 3 (SF) ESPN: 4 (SF)
Note: In many cases, Scout, Rivals, 247Sports, On3, and ESPN may conflict in their listings of height and weight.; In these cases, the average was taken. ESPN grades are on a 100-point scale.; Sources: "2012 Team Ranking". Rivals.

== College career ==
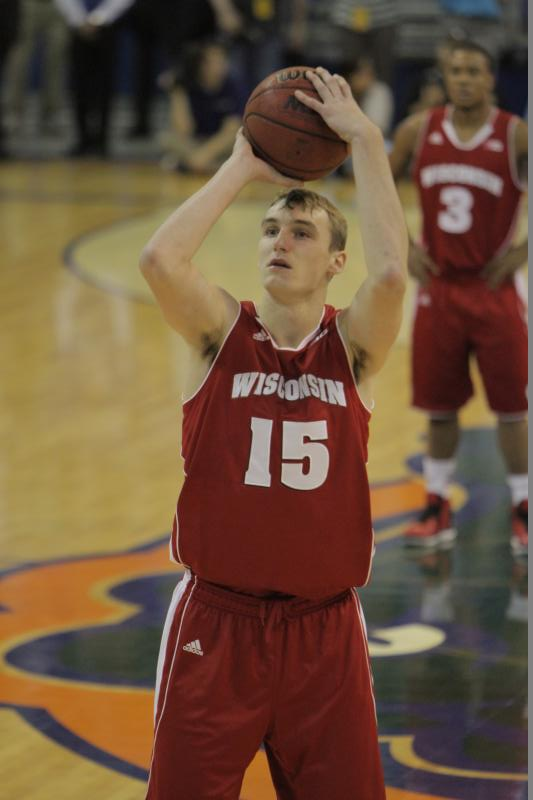
Dekker with Wisconsin in 2012

=== Freshman season ===
Dekker played in 35 games (3 starts) as a freshman on the Wisconsin Badgers. He was one of only four true freshman to start under Bo Ryan, joining Devin Harris, Alando Tucker and Josh Gasser. He earned Big Ten All-Freshman team recognition as well as honorable mention All-Big Ten honors. He was also two-time Big Ten Freshman of the Week (January 14 and March 4, 2013). Dekker scored a season-high 19 points against Arkansas on November 24, 2012, and Nebraska on February 26, 2013.

=== Sophomore season ===
Before the season, Dekker was named to the Wooden Award and Naismith Trophy watch lists.

At the conclusion of the regular season in which he started all 38 games, Dekker was named to the Second Team All-Big Ten by the coaches and Third Team All-Big Ten by the media.

=== Junior season ===
Before the season, Dekker was named to the Wooden Award and Naismith Trophy watch lists.

At the conclusion of the regular season, Dekker was named to the Second Team All-Big Ten by the coaches and by the media. But he really only took off in the NCAA Tournament. In the Sweet 16 against the number four seeded North Carolina Tar Heels, Dekker scored a career high 23 points and grabbed 10 rebounds to lead the 1-seed Wisconsin to a 79–72 victory. In the Elite 8 against the number 2-seeded Arizona Wildcats, Dekker again came up big, scoring a new career high 27 points, including 5 of the Badgers's 10 second-half threes, the final of which is now known nationally as the "Dekker Dagger" shot because it sealed the win for Wisconsin. For these efforts, he was named West Regional Most Outstanding Player during the 2015 NCAA Men's Division I Basketball Tournament. In the Final Four game against the heavily favored and undefeated Kentucky Wildcats, Dekker came through with another huge game, scoring 16 points, including the three that gave Wisconsin the lead for good. The Badgers finished second in the NCAA tournament after losing to Duke in the championship game. A week later, Dekker declared for the 2015 NBA draft, forgoing his final year of college eligibility.

== Professional career ==
=== Houston Rockets (2015–2017) ===
On June 25, 2015, Dekker was selected by the Houston Rockets with the 18th overall pick in the 2015 NBA draft. On July 7, he signed his rookie scale contract with the Rockets but subsequently missed the entire 2015 NBA Summer League due to a back injury. He appeared in all eight of the Rockets' preseason games, but managed game time in just three of the team's first 11 regular-season games. On November 18, 2015, he was ruled out for three months after requiring back surgery. On February 19, 2016, he was assigned to the Rio Grande Valley Vipers, the Rockets' D-League affiliate, on a rehab assignment. He was recalled by the Rockets on February 22. He went on to receive two more assignments to the Vipers.

On December 14, 2016, Dekker scored a career-high 19 points in a 132–98 win over the Sacramento Kings. On January 21, 2017, he made his first career start and set a new career high with 30 points in a 119–95 win over the Memphis Grizzlies.

=== Los Angeles Clippers (2017–2018) ===
On June 28, 2017, the Los Angeles Clippers acquired Dekker, Patrick Beverley, Montrezl Harrell, Darrun Hilliard, DeAndre Liggins, Lou Williams, Kyle Wiltjer and a 2018 first-round pick from the Houston Rockets in exchange for Chris Paul.

=== Cleveland Cavaliers (2018) ===
On August 7, 2018, Dekker was traded, along with the draft rights to Renaldas Seibutis and cash considerations, to the Cleveland Cavaliers in exchange for the draft rights to Vladimir Veremeenko.

=== Washington Wizards (2018–2019) ===
On December 7, 2018, Dekker was traded to the Washington Wizards in a five-player, three-team deal. The Wizards traded Jason Smith and cash considerations to the Milwaukee Bucks. The Bucks sent John Henson, Matthew Dellavedova, and 2021 first- and second-round picks to the Cleveland Cavaliers and received George Hill and a 2021 second-round pick. The Wizards also sent a 2022 second-round pick to the Cavs.

=== Lokomotiv Kuban (2019–2020) ===
On August 5, 2019, Dekker signed with Russian club PBC Lokomotiv Kuban of the VTB United League and the EuroCup.

=== Türk Telekom (2020–2021) ===
On July 23, 2020, Dekker signed with Türk Telekom of the Turkish Super League (BSL).

=== Toronto Raptors (2021) ===
On August 10, 2021, Dekker signed with the Toronto Raptors. However, he was waived on November 6, after making a single regular season appearance.

=== Bahçeşehir Koleji (2021–2022) ===
On December 4, 2021, Dekker signed with Bahçeşehir Koleji of the Turkish Basketball Super League. The team won the 2021-22 FIBA Europe Cup, with Dekker averaging 13.1 points and 7.2 rebounds per game. He helped Bahçeşehir win the 2021–22 FIBA Europe Cup, contributing averages of 11 points and 5.5 rebounds in the Finals.

=== London Lions (2022–2024) ===
On August 7, 2022, Dekker signed with the London Lions of the British Basketball League (BBL) and the EuroCup. In his inaugural season, the Lions won both the 2022–23 BBL Cup and Championship, and Dekker was the top scorer in the EuroCup regular season. In May, Dekker was named the MVP of the 2022–23 BBL season. In the 2022-23 Eurocup season, club debut in the second european competition, they reached the play-offs but being knocked in the eightfinals against Joventut Badalona. Sam was the best player of the team in the whole season and play-offs, and got into the All-Eurocup second team. He won the BBL again in the 2023–24 season, becoming MVP of the Final. In the 2023–24 Eurocup season they reached the semi-finals for the first time in the history of the club but also for an english club in European competitions, being knocked by the future champions of the competition, Paris Basketball.

=== Joventut Badalona (2024–2026) ===
On November 12, 2024, Dekker signed a temporary contract with Joventut Badalona, a historic team from Catalonia (Spain) in the ACB League. Joventut was also taking part the EuroCup but didn't reach the play-offs due to a bad start in the regular season. After achieving qualification in 5th position for the Spanish King's Cup and his big impact on the team, Sam extended his contract until the end of the season as he became a key player since his arrival.

He was named ACB Week 12 MVP after a memorable performance with 30 points (8 three-pointers) and 8 rebounds against Leyma Coruña. With Joventut finishing in 6th position in the ACB, Dekker averaged 13 points and 4 rebounds per game (41% 3PT). Joventut qualified for the play-offs, falling in the quarterfinals.

On August 1, 2025, Sam extended his contract with Joventut Badalona for one more year, until June 2026. In February 2026, Dekker reached an agreement to terminate his contract with Joventut in order to travel to the US to seek treatment for recurring shoulder injuries.

== Coaching career ==
On May 15, 2026, Dekker was hired by the University of South Carolina men's basketball team as an assistant coach. Dekker played three seasons with Gamecocks head coach Lamont Paris from 2012-15 while Paris was an assistant at Wisconsin.

== Personal life ==
Dekker has remained a Sheboygan resident throughout his NBA career. In November 2016, Dekker purchased a 1,568-square-foot condo on the Sheboygan River for $289,000.

In May 2017, Dekker became engaged to Olivia Harlan, an ESPN and SEC Network reporter, daughter of NBA and NFL announcer Kevin Harlan, and granddaughter of NFL Green Bay Packers Chairman Emeritus Bob Harlan. The two were married on July 14, 2018. In 2022, they welcomed their first child.

Dekker's cousin, Zack Annexstad, is an American football quarterback who had a brief stint for the Tampa Bay Buccaneers in 2024.

== National team career ==
In Summer 2012, Dekker was on the under-18 United States national team that defeated Brazil for the gold medal in the FIBA Americas championship, but his play was limited due to an injury.

== Career statistics ==
Legend
GP	Games played	GS	Games started	MPG	Minutes per game
FG%	Field goal percentage	3P%	3-point field goal percentage	FT%	Free throw percentage
RPG	Rebounds per game	APG	Assists per game	SPG	Steals per game
BPG	Blocks per game	PPG	Points per game	**Bold**	Career high

=== NBA ===
==== Regular season ====
Year	Team	GP	GS	MPG	FG%	3P%	FT%	RPG	APG	SPG	BPG	PPG
2015–16	Houston	3	0	2.0	.000	.000	.000	0.3	-	0.3	-	-
2016–17	Houston	**77**	2	18.4	.473	.321	.559	**3.7**	**1.0**	0.5	**0.3**	**6.5**
2017–18	L.A. Clippers	73	1	12.1	**.494**	.167	.661	2.4	0.5	0.3	0.1	4.2
2018–19	Cleveland	9	**5**	**18.8**	.458	**.385**	**.800**	**3.7**	**1.0**	**1.2**	-	6.3
2018–19	Washington	38	0	16.3	.471	.286	.556	3.0	**1.0**	0.7	0.2	6.1
2021–22	Toronto	1	0	1.0	–	–	–	-	-	-	-	-
Career		201	8	15.4	.478	.288	.606	3.0	0.8	0.5	0.2	5.5

==== Playoffs ====
Year	Team	GP	GS	MPG	FG%	3P%	FT%	RPG	APG	SPG	BPG	PPG
2017	Houston	4	0	7.8	.250	.500	.000	2.5	0.3	0.3	0.3	2.3
Career		4	0	7.8	.250	.500	.000	2.5	0.3	0.3	0.3	2.3

=== College ===
Year	Team	GP	GS	MPG	FG%	3P%	FT%	RPG	APG	SPG	BPG	PPG
2012–13	Wisconsin	35	3	22.3	.476	**.391**	.690	3.4	1.3	0.7	0.4	9.6
2013–14	Wisconsin	38	38	29.8	.469	.326	.686	**6.1**	**1.4**	**0.8**	**0.6**	12.4
2014–15	Wisconsin	**40**	**40**	**31.0**	**.525**	.331	**.708**	5.5	1.2	0.5	0.5	**13.9**
Career		113	81	27.9	.493	.348	.695	5.0	1.3	0.6	0.5	12.1

=== Eurocup ===
Year	Team	GP	GS	MPG	FG%	3P%	FT%	RPG	APG	SPG	BPG	PPG	PIR
2019-20	Lokomotiv Kuban	10	8	27.0	**.705**	.303	.789	5.3	1.5	0.9	0.6	13.1	15.6
2022-23	London Lions	**16**	**16**	**30.8**	.528	.263	.677	**5.6**	**2.9**	**1.3**	**0.7**	**18.2**	**19.6**
2023-24	London Lions	11	4	21.5	.563	**.355**	.769	4.4	1.3	0.7	0.3	11.8	12.1
2024-25	Joventut Badalona	10	8	25.1	.571	.263	**.811**	4.7	1.9	0.8	0.3	13.1	13.3
Career		47	36	26.2	.630	.303	.773	5.0	1.8	0.9	0.5	14.1	15.2

=== BCL ===
Year	Team	GP	GS	MPG	FG%	3P%	FT%	RPG	APG	SPG	BPG	PPG	PIR
2020-21	Türk Telekom B.K.	**12**	**11**	**27.4**	**.686**	**.356**	**.733**	**5.8**	**2.1**	**0.9**	**0.6**	**13.7**	**15.3**
2025-26	Joventut Badalona	5	1	17.5	.571	.250	.600	3.8	1.0	0.8	-	7.4	7

=== FIBA Europe Cup ===
Year	Team	GP	GS	MPG	FG%	3P%	FT%	RPG	APG	SPG	BPG	PPG	PIR
2021-22	Bahçeşehir Koleji S.K.	10	9	26.2	.565	**.337**	**.755**	**7.2**	1.4	**1.1**	**0.7**	13.1	14.2

=== BSL ===
Year	Team	GP	GS	MPG	FG%	3P%	FT%	RPG	APG	SPG	BPG	PPG	PIR
2020-21	Turk Telekom B.K.	**28**	**25**	**33**	**.541**	**.452**	.712	**5.6**	**2.2**	**1.1**	0.1	15.4	**16.3**
2021-22	Bahçeşehir Koleji S.K.	18	17	26	.475	.342	**.733**	5.5	1.9	1	**0.2**	**13.2**	15.6

=== ACB ===
Year	Team	GP	GS	MPG	FG%	3P%	FT%	RPG	APG	SPG	BPG	PPG	PIR
2024-25	Joventut Badalona	26	16	27	.482	.423	**.813**	**4.1**	**1.2**	**0.9**	**0.3**	**13**	**11.2**
2025-26	Joventut Badalona	12	1	16	.550	.220	-	3.2	0.7	0.5	0.3	4.6	3.3

=== Copa del Rey ===
Year	Team	GP	GS	MPG	FG%	3P%	FT%	RPG	APG	SPG	BPG	PPG	PIR
2025	Joventut Badalona	1	1	**28**	**.750**	**.625**	.667	2.0	1.0	-	-	**23**	22

=== ACB Play-offs ===
Year	Team	GP	GS	MPG	FG%	3P%	FT%	RPG	APG	SPG	BPG	PPG	PIR
2025	Joventut Badalona	2	0	27	.690	.333	.667	2.0	0.5	**1.0**	-	11	6.5
