= Michael Miller (basketball) =

American basketball coach

Michael Robert Miller (born August 1, 1964) is an American basketball coach with a diverse career spanning professional, collegiate, and high school levels. As of 2024, Miller has served seven years as the head basketball coach at the University of Los Angeles College of Divinity (ULACD). Prior to that, he held the roles of Commissioner and Head Coach of the California Basketball Association (CBA) from 2016 to 2019.

Miller is best known for his record-setting tenure at Los Angeles City College (LACC), where he led the men's basketball team to 14 consecutive conference championships. This achievement, which he shares solely with University of Kansas coach Bill Self, remains a very rare feat in college basketball history.

== Early coaching career ==
Miller began his coaching career at the age of 16, starting with youth basketball teams and a local YMCA team while still a student at Crescenta Valley High School. He later worked as an assistant coach for Glendale Community College, La Canada High School, and Blair High School. His first significant coaching position came in 1987, when Cathedral High School's athletic director, Tim Salter, hired him after seeing Miller coach Blair HS Principal, Chuck Parcell's son's YMCA team at the Crescenta-Canada YMCA in LaCanada, CA. Under Miller's leadership, Cathedral's basketball team achieved a 43-11 record, capturing the Santa Fe League title for the first time in nine years.

From 1987 to 1989, Miller's tenure marked the most successful period in Cathedral's history. He then moved to Ribet Academy in Los Angeles, where he led the team to two Southern Section High School Championships in 1990 and 1991, and a state championship in 1991.

== Los Angeles City College (LACC) ==
From 1992 to 2008, Miller served as head coach of the Los Angeles City College men's basketball team. During his time at LACC, he compiled an impressive record, winning 88% of the games he coached and leading the team to 400 victories. His tenure included four consecutive 30+ win seasons between 1999 and 2003, and a historic run from 1997 to 2006, during which his team posted a 241-38 record with an .864 winning percentage, surpassing all NCAA Division I programs over that period.

In 1997, Miller led LACC to its first-ever state championship in its 72-year history. Under his leadership, the team won numerous conference and tournament championships, produced five All-American players, and saw 19 players named to all-conference teams. Under Miller, LACC set a new national record of 14 straight conference championships, starting in 1993-94 and continuing until 2006-07, breaking UCLA's old record of 13 (nine of which were won under John Wooden). Miller's coaching also focused on academic success, achieving a 100% graduation rate for sophomore athletes and securing Division I scholarships for over 100 players.

Miller is credited with producing more than 100 Division I players during his time at LACC, which is considered a national record for that period.

== University of Los Angeles College of Divinity (ULACD) ==
Miller joined ULACD in 2017, where he continued his success as head coach. Between 2018 and 2022, ULACD posted a 105-8 record, marking the second-best winning percentage of any four-year college in the nation during that time, trailing only Northwest Missouri State. The 2019-2020 season was particularly successful, with ULACD achieving a 30-1 record and winning the ACCA national championship, and being runner-ups in 2020-21 and 2021-22.

== Recognition ==
At age 21, Miller became the youngest varsity head coach in the state of California, followed by being the youngest head college coach in the country at age 26; Miller has been widely recognized for his achievements.

He is the first coach to lead a state high school championship team (Ribet Academy 1990-91), a junior college state-wide championship team (Los Angeles City College 1996-97 and 2002-2003), and a national championship squad. He has been named "Coach of the Year" 18 times in his 19 full seasons, and is the only coach to have won high school, junior college, and national titles.

ULACD achieved a winning record in the state of California (2018-2022), where they played in the last three ACCA National Championship games, winning the 2019-20 ACCA National Championship and being runner-ups in 2020-21 and 2021-22. With ULACD's victories in the ACCA's 38th annual national tournament, Coach Miller added national championship (ULACD 2019-20) to set a new trifecta record never before achieved by any basketball coach.

By age 44, Miller had amassed nearly 500 collegiate wins, more than any other coach in the history of college basketball at that time. In addition to his coaching career, Miller served as Commissioner of the CBA from 2014 to 2017 and holds five college degrees, including a Doctorate in Religious Studies from the United States Ecclesiastical Society and Seminary in Los Angeles.
