= Jonathan Komagum =

French basketball player (born 1998)

No. 21 – Gostivar
- Position: Power forward / center
- League: Macedonian League

Personal information
- Born: 15 November 1998 (age 28) London, England
- Listed height: 6 ft 9 in (2.06 m)
- Listed weight: 215 lb (98 kg)

Career information
- High school: City of London Academy (London, England); TaylorMade Academy (Avondale, Arizona)
- College: Williston State (2018-2020); Toledo (2020-2021); Sacramento State (2021-2022); Southeastern Louisiana (2022-2023)
- NBA draft: 2023: undrafted
- Playing career: 2022–present

Career history
- 2022–2023: London Lions
- 2024: Bima Perkasa Jogja
- 2024–present: Gostivar

Jonathan "Jono" Komagum (born 15 November 1998) is a Ugandan-British professional basketball player for the Gostivar of the Macedonian League.

== Professional career ==
=== London Lions (2022-2023) ===
Komagum signed for the London Lions last summer following his time at NCAA Division I school Sacramento State. He suffered a knee injury in Sunday's game vs Bristol that will require season-ending surgery. Resulting in him being out for the rest of the season.

=== Bima Perkasa Jogja (2023-present) ===
On 15 March 2024, Bima Perkasa Jogja announces Komagum, who is going to replace Feliciano Perez Neto.

== National team career ==
Was called up to the Uganda national team for the FIBA Basketball World Cup 2023 African Qualifiers.

== Personal life ==
Komagum majored in Interdisciplinary Studies.
