= Jordan Taylor (basketball) =

American basketball player (born 1989)

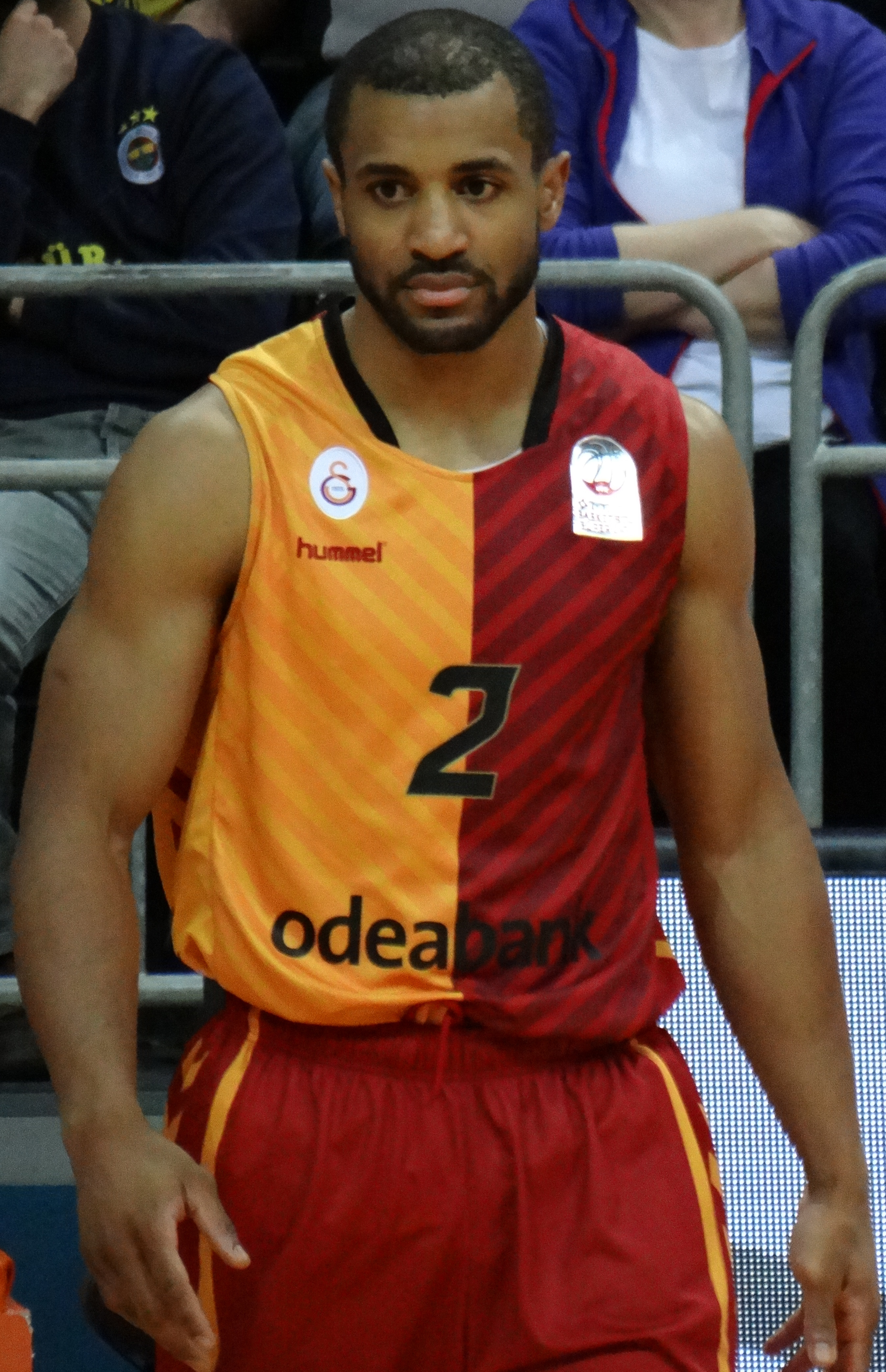
- Taylor in 2018

No. 1 – London Lions
- Position: Point guard
- League: BBL

Personal information
- Born: September 30, 1989 (age 37) Bloomington, Minnesota, U.S.
- Listed height: 6 ft 1 in (1.85 m)
- Listed weight: 195 lb (88 kg)

Career information
- High school: Benilde-St. Margaret's (St. Louis Park, Minnesota)
- College: Wisconsin (2008–2012)
- NBA draft: 2012: undrafted
- Playing career: 2012–present

Career history
- 2012–2014: Virtus Roma
- 2014–2015: Hapoel Holon
- 2015–2016: Alba Berlin
- 2016–2017: Hapoel Holon
- 2017–2018: Galatasaray
- 2018–2019: Limoges CSP
- 2019–2020: ASVEL
- 2020–2021: Levanga Hokkaido
- 2021–2022: Alvark Tokyo
- 2022: U-BT Cluj-Napoca
- 2022–present: London Lions

Career highlights
- German Cup winner (2016); Consensus second-team All-American (2011); First-team All-Big Ten (2011); First-team All-Big Ten – Coaches (2012); Second-team All-Big Ten – Media (2012); Big Ten All-Defensive team (2011); Minnesota Mr. Basketball (2008)
- Stats at Basketball Reference

Jordan Michael Taylor (born September 30, 1989) is an American professional basketball player for London Lions of the British Basketball League (BBL).

== High school career ==
Named Minnesota Mr. Basketball as a senior, averaging 22.3 points and 7.1 assists per game. Led Benilde-St. Margaret's to the Minnesota state Class AAA title in 2008 and was a 2-time all-state and 4-time all-conference honoree. He is also the All-time leading scorer in Benilde-St. Margaret's history with 2,068 points over his career. Took his school to a runner-up finish as a junior, earning North Suburban Conference MVP and Class AAA All-Tournament that year and averaged 19.5 points, 6.2 assists and 5.5 rebounds as a junior. Was named honorable mention all-state as a sophomore. Was a member of the National Honor Society and earned the Minnesota State High School League Outstanding Academic Achievement Award.

== Collegiate career ==
Taylor was one of eleven finalists for the 2011 Bob Cousy Award which is given to the nation's top point guard.

Taylor was awarded 2nd team All-American by Yahoo Sports. He was joined by guards Kemba Walker of Connecticut and Ben Hansbrough of Notre Dame also forwards Derrick Williams of Arizona and Kawhi Leonard of San Diego State. He was picked to the First Team All-America by Fox Sports.

For the 2011–12 season, Taylor was named to multiple preseason watchlists:

- Wooden Award Top 50 list
- All-Big Ten team
- All-American team (AP, Blue Ribbon Yearbook and Athlon Magazine)
- Naismith Trophy Top 50 list

On February 26, 2012, Taylor scored 19 points in an upset win over then 10th ranked Ohio State in Columbus. Taylor then moved into 10th place on Wisconsin's all-time scoring list with 1,418 points. He passed both Cory Blackwell (1,405) and Clarence Sherrod (1,408) during the game. The next game on February 28, Taylor scored 22 points in a win over Minnesota. Taylor then moved into 9th place on Wisconsin's all-time scoring list passing Devin Harris.

On March 22, 2012, Taylor played in his final college basketball game losing in the sweet sixteen to the number one seeded Syracuse Orange, 64–63. In this game, Taylor made 23 three-pointers in NCAA Tournament games for his career. Taylor broke the school record of 19, held by Jon Bryant. Taylor also broke the all-time NCAA assist-to-turnover ratio.

== Professional career ==
After going undrafted in 2012, Taylor agreed to play for the Atlanta Hawks in the 2012 NBA Summer League.

On August 6, 2012, Taylor signed with Virtus Roma of the Italian League. In the 2012–13 season, he averaged 11.5 points, 2.8 rebounds and 3.7 assists He parted ways with them on February 5, 2014, after averaging 11.2 points, 2.7 rebounds and 3.9 assists in 16 games

In 2014, Taylor agreed to play for the Milwaukee Bucks Summer League team.

He spent the 2014–15 season with Hapoel Holon in Israel where he averaged 14.5 points, 2.9 rebounds and 4.5 assists.

On August 7, 2015, Taylor signed with Alba Berlin in Germany. After one season, he parted ways with Alba. He averaged 11.6 points, 2.8 rebounds and 4.4 assists in 33 games with the team.

On December 28, 2016, Taylor returned to Hapoel Holon. He averaged 10.2 points, 3.3 rebounds and 4.1 assists in his return to the team.

On November 3, 2017, Taylor signed with Turkish club Galatasaray.

On July 2, 2019, he has signed with ASVEL of the LNB Pro A. Taylor signed with Levanga Hokkaido of the Japanese B.League on July 7, 2020.

On July 14, 2022, he signed with U-BT Cluj-Napoca of the Liga Națională and the EuroCup.

On December 12, 2022, he signed with London Lions of the British Basketball League (BBL).

== Personal life ==
Jordan was born in Bloomington, Minnesota to parents are Louis and Lezlie Taylor. Jordan has one older brother, Brandon (38). Prep teammate of Armond Battle (University of Tulsa) at Benilde-St. Margaret's and majored in business marketing.

== College statistics ==
Legend
GP	Games played	GS	Games started	MPG	Minutes per game
FG%	Field goal percentage	3P%	3-point field goal percentage	FT%	Free throw percentage
RPG	Rebounds per game	APG	Assists per game	SPG	Steals per game
BPG	Blocks per game	PPG	Points per game	**Bold**	Career high

Year	Team	GP	GS	MPG	FG%	3P%	FT%	RPG	APG	SPG	BPG	PPG
2008–09	Wisconsin Badgers	33	0	13.2	26.0	19.2	58.8	0.9	1.2	0.3	0.0	1.6
2009–10	Wisconsin Badgers	33	17	29.5	39.5	32.7	71.8	3.2	3.6	0.9	**0.1**	10.0
2010–11	Wisconsin Badgers	34	34	**36.5**	**43.3**	**42.9**	**83.2**	**4.1**	**4.7**	0.7	**0.1**	**18.1**
2011–12	Wisconsin Badgers	**36**	**36**	36.0	40.2	36.9	78.5	3.8	4.1	**1.0**	0.0	14.8
