= Luke Nelson (basketball) =

British basketball player (born 1995)

- Nelson with Manchester Basketball in 2026

No. 6 – Manchester Basketball
- Position: Shooting guard / point guard
- League: SBL

Personal information
- Born: 29 June 1995 (age 31) London, England
- Listed height: 6 ft 3 in (1.91 m)
- Listed weight: 190 lb (86 kg)

Career information
- College: UC Irvine (2013–2017)
- NBA draft: 2017: undrafted
- Playing career: 2017–present

Career history
- 2017–2018: Real Betis
- 2019–2020: Manresa
- 2020–2021: BG Göttingen
- 2021–2022: ESSM Le Portel
- 2022–2024: London Lions
- 2024–2025: Anwil Włocławek
- 2025–2026: Soproni KC
- 2026–present: Manchester Basketball

Career highlights
- AP Honorable Mention All-American (2017); Big West Player of the Year (2017); 2× First-team All-Big West (2016, 2017)

Luke Isaiah Nelson (born 29 June 1995) is a British professional basketball player for Manchester Basketball of the Super League Basketball (SBL). He also represents the Great Britain national team in international competitions. He played American college basketball for UC Irvine, where he was named the 2017 Big West Conference Player of the Year.

== Early life and education ==
Nelson was born in London and grew up in Worthing. He attended Henley College. He first played basketball for the Worthing Thunder junior programme, followed the Reading Rockets Division 1 team alongside playing for several England and Great Britain squads in the U16, U18 and U20 age groups in FIBA tournaments. He was named British player of the year in his age group for three consecutive seasons.

He attended college at the University of California, Irvine, where he became a four-year starter. He was named first-team All-Big West Conference in his junior and senior seasons and was named Big West Player of the Year as a senior.

Nelson helped UC Irvine to its first NCAA Tournament appearance in 2015 and help guide the Anteaters to a program record 28 wins in 2016. For all 4 seasons at UC Irvine, Nelson helped the team make a postseason appearance of some kind. He finished his collegiate career 4th in made threes (204), fifth in assists (361) and eighth in steals (115) and played in the collegiate All Star Game at the 2017 Final Four.

== Professional career ==
=== Real Betis (2017–2018) ===
After going undrafted in the 2017 NBA draft after playing in the NBA Summer League with the Los Angeles Clippers, Nelson signed his first professional contract with Herbalife Gran Canaria in Spain's Liga ACB and EuroCup competition. He was sent to Real Betis Energía Plus on loan prior to the start of the season.

=== Baxi Manresa (2019–2020) ===
On 15 November 2019, Nelson signed with Baxi Manresa of the Spanish Liga ACB.

=== BG Göttingen (2020–2021) ===
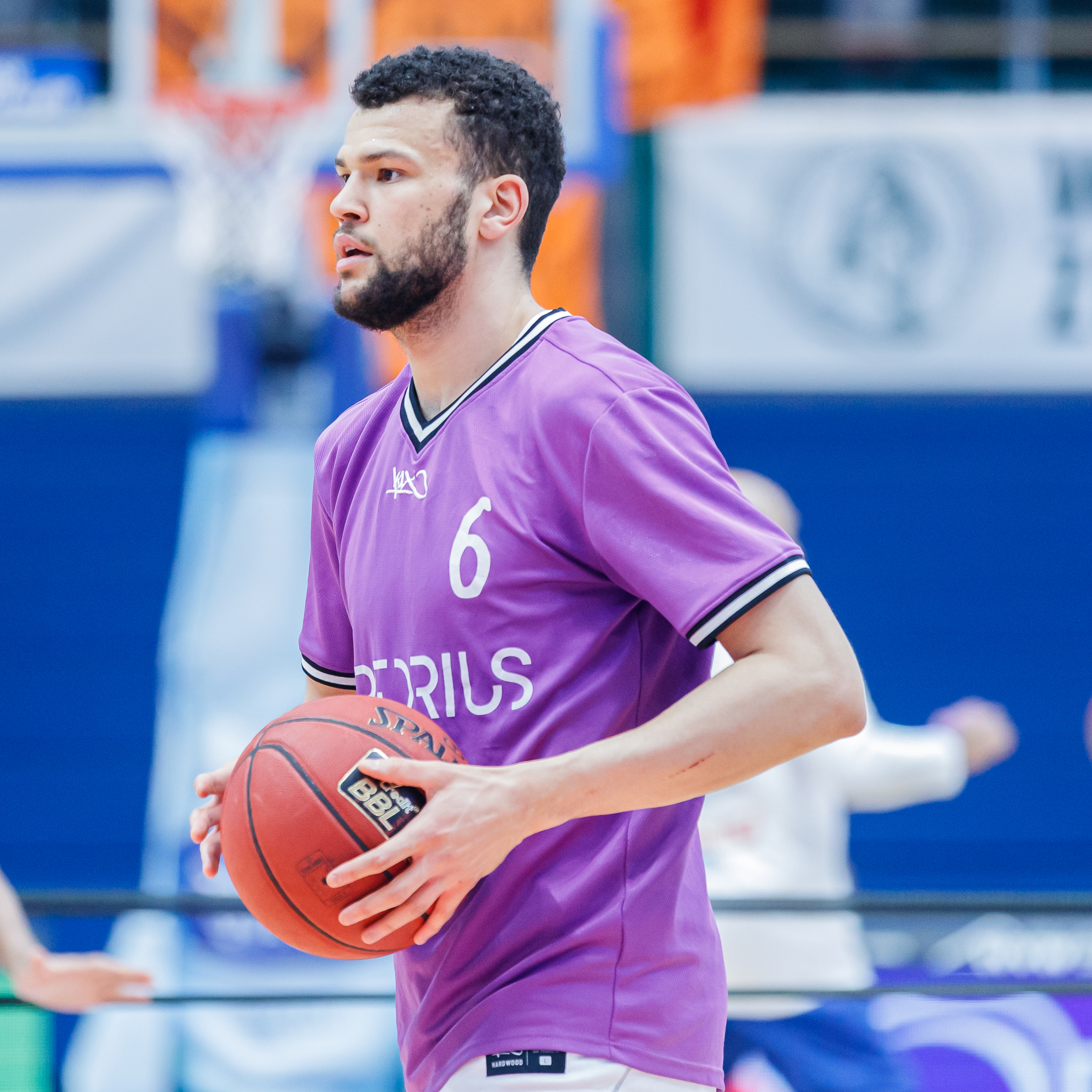
Nelson with BG Göttingen in 2021

On 30 July 2020, Nelson signed with BG Göttingen of the Basketball Bundesliga.

=== ESSM Le Portel (2021–2022) ===
On 16 July 2021, Nelson signed with ESSM Le Portel of the French LNB Pro A.

=== London Lions (2022–2024) ===
On 3 August 2022, Nelson signed with the London Lions of the Super League Basketball (SBL) and the EuroCup.

=== Anwil Włocławek (2024–2025) ===
On 2 August 2024, Nelson signed with Anwil Włocławek of the Polish Basketball League (PLK).

=== Soproni KC (2025–2026) ===
On 27 July 2025, Nelson signed with Soproni KC of the Hungarian Nemzeti Bajnokság I/A (NB I/A).

=== Manchester Basketball (2026–present) ===
On 3 August 2026, Nelson signed with Manchester Basketball of the Super League Basketball (SLB).

== International career ==
Nelson has competed for the Great Britain senior national team since graduating college and is usually the starting shooting guard on the squad during competition.

SEASON AVERAGES
SEASON	TEAM	MIN	FGM-FGA	FG%	3PM-3PA	3P%	FTM-FTA	FT%	REB	AST	BLK	STL	PF	TO	PTS
2016-17	UCI	26.0	5.6-12.3	.457	3.0-6.9	.432	2.7-3.9	.690	3.3	3.0	0.2	1.7	2.3	2.6	16.9
2015-16	UCI	31.0	4.7-10.8	.430	2.2-6.1	.358	2.2-2.6	.866	2.9	3.9	0.1	1.3	1.7	1.8	13.7
2014-15	UCI	29.3	3.5-9.7	.357	1.7-5.5	.303	1.9-2.6	.722	2.9	4.0	0.1	1.0	2.0	2.6	10.5
2013-14	UCI	29.0	4.0-9.6	.412	2.1-5.6	.376	1.7-2.3	.732	2.5	2.9	0.3	1.1	2.1	2.2	11.8
