= Tomislav Zubčić =

Croatian basketball player

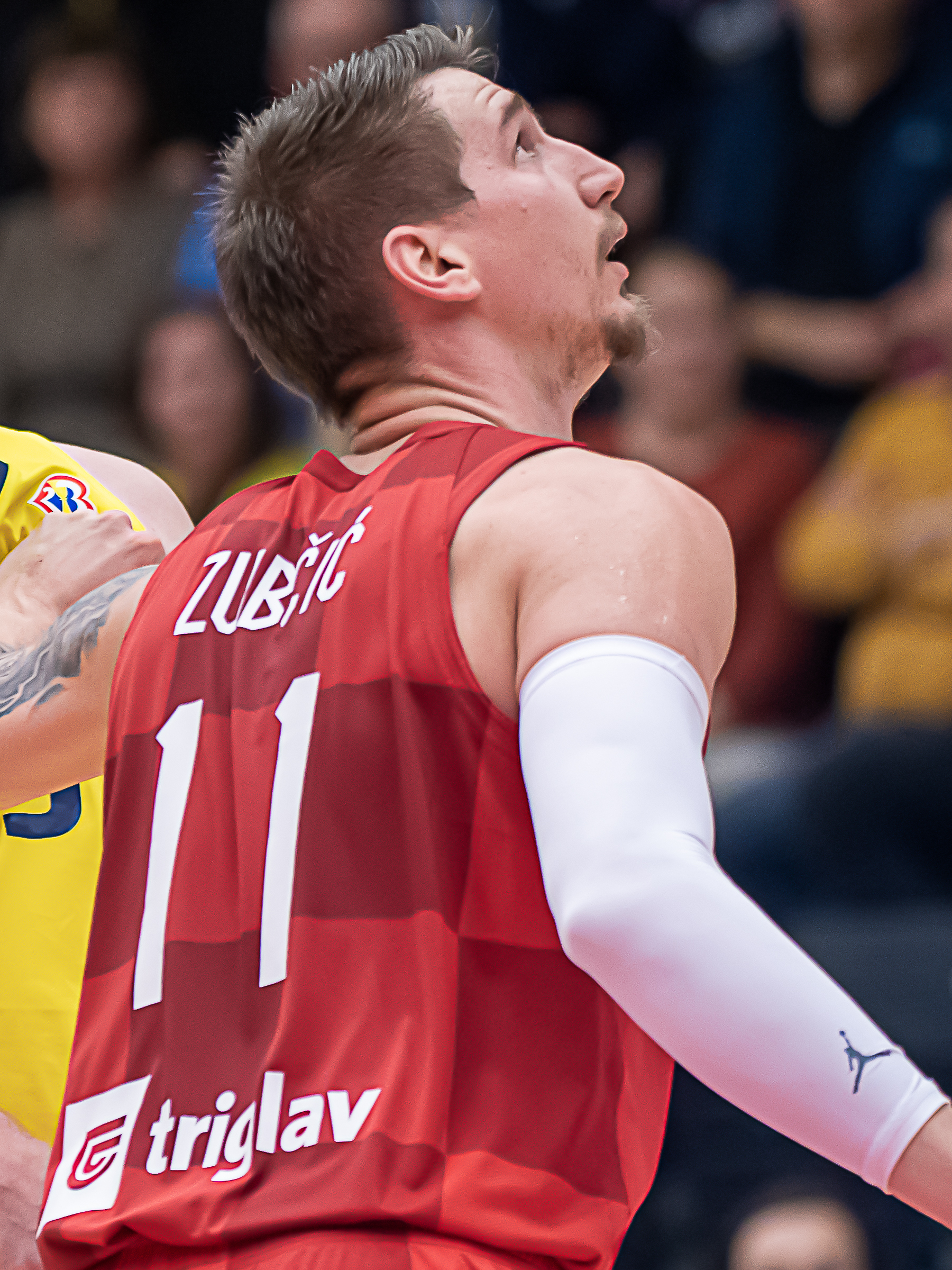

No. 33 – Astros de Jalisco
- Position: Power forward / center
- League: LNBP

Personal information
- Born: January 17, 1990 (age 36) Zadar, SR Croatia, SFR Yugoslavia
- Listed height: 2.11 ft 0 in (0.64 m)
- Listed weight: 111 kg (245 lb)

Career information
- NBA draft: 2012: 2nd round, 56th overall pick
- Drafted by: Toronto Raptors
- Playing career: 2007–present

Career history
- 2007–2008: Rudeš
- 2008–2013: Cibona
- 2013: Lietuvos rytas
- 2013–2015: Cedevita
- 2015–2016: Oklahoma City Blue
- 2016: Avtodor Saratov
- 2016–2017: Nizhny Novgorod
- 2017: Trabzonspor
- 2017–2018: Telekom Baskets Bonn
- 2018–2019: Igokea
- 2019: Manresa
- 2019–2020: Enisey
- 2020–2022: Tofaş
- 2022–2023: London Lions
- 2023–2024: Napoli Basket
- 2024: Anhui Wenyi
- 2024: Qadsia
- 2024–2025: Napoli Basket
- 2025: Al Ahly Benghazi
- 2025–2026: Baskets Oldenburg
- 2026–present: Astros de Jalisco

Career highlights
- 5× Croatian League champion (2009, 2010, 2012, 2014, 2015); 3× Croatian Cup winner (2009, 2014, 2015); Italian Cup winner (2024); Lithuanian League All-Star (2013)
- Stats at Basketball Reference
Medals
Men's basketball
Representing Croatia
World U-19 Championship
Bronze medal – third place	2009 New Zealand	U-19 Team
European U-18 Championship
Bronze medal – third place	2008 Greece	U-18 Team

Tomislav Zubčić (born 17 January 1990) is a Croatian professional basketball player for Astros de Jalisco of the Liga Nacional de Baloncesto Profesional (LNBP). Standing at 2.11 m (6 ft 11 in), he plays both the power forward and center positions.

== Professional career ==
=== NBA ===
On 28 June 2012, Zubčić was selected by the Toronto Raptors with the 56th overall pick in the 2012 NBA draft. On 30 June 2015, his rights were traded to the Oklahoma City Thunder in exchange for Luke Ridnour and cash considerations.

On 17 September 2016, the Thunder renounced to Zubčić's draft rights, making him eligible to sign with any NBA team.

=== Europe ===
Zubčić grew up with KK Zadar youth teams and with Cibona Zagreb juniors. He spent the 2007–08 season with KK Rudeš, before returning to Cibona for the 2008–09 season. He went on to win three championships with Cibona, departing the club on 16 January 2013, in order to join Lietuvos rytas of the Lithuanian League. He played half a season with Rytas before returning to Croatia for the 2013–14 season, signing with Cedevita Zagreb on 27 September 2013. He played for Cedevita until October 2015, leaving the club after appearing in just nine games to begin the 2015–16 season.

=== D-League ===
On 24 December 2015, Zubčić was acquired by the Oklahoma City Blue, the Thunder's D-League affiliate. He made his debut the next day in a 99–84 loss to the Sioux Falls Skyforce.

=== Return to Europe ===
On 29 September 2016, Zubčić signed a one-month contract with Russian club Avtodor Saratov.

On 2 December 2016, he signed with Russian club Nizhny Novgorod.

On 28 July 2017, he signed with Turkish club Trabzonspor.

On 22 November 2017, Zubčić signed with German club Telekom Baskets Bonn.

On 20 August 2018, he signed with Igokea.

On 8 January 2019, Zubčić left Igokea and signed for Baxi Manresa.

In July 2019, he signed with Enisey, returning to the VTB United League.

On 25 December 2020, Zubčić signed with Tofaş, returning to the Basketbol Süper Ligi.

On 26 July 2023, he signed with Napoli Basket of the Italian Lega Basket Serie A.

=== Asia ===
On 21 May 2024, Zubčić signed with Anhui Wenyi of the National Basketball League.

On 31 July 2024, he was replaced by the club which hired Troy Gillenwater for his position.

On 2 October 2024, he signed with Qadsia of the Kuwaiti Division I Basketball League.

=== Second return to Europe ===
On 18 December 2024, Zubčić, once again, signed with Napoli Basket.

== National team career ==
Zubčić won the bronze medal at the 2008 Junior European Championship. He later won another bronze medal at the 2009 U-19 World Championship.
