= Aaron Best (basketball) =

Canadian basketball player (born 1992)

- Best with Andorra in 2026

No. 3 – BC Andorra
- Position: Shooting guard
- League: Liga ACB

Personal information
- Born: September 1, 1992 (age 34) Toronto, Ontario, Canada
- Listed height: 6 ft 4 in (1.93 m)
- Listed weight: 195 lb (88 kg)

Career information
- High school: Eastern Commerce Collegiate Institute (Toronto, Ontario)
- College: Ryerson (2011–2016)
- NBA draft: 2016: undrafted
- Playing career: 2016–present

Career history
- 2016–2017: BC Juventus
- 2017–2018: Raptors 905
- 2018–2019: Riesen Ludwigsburg
- 2019–2020: PAOK
- 2020–2021: Boulazac
- 2021–2022: Raptors 905
- 2022: Hamilton Honey Badgers
- 2022–2023: London Lions
- 2023–2025: Trefl Sopot
- 2025: Scarborough Shooting Stars
- 2025–present: BC Andorra

Career highlights
- PLK Best Defender (2025); PLK champion (2024)

Aaron Best (born September 1, 1992) is a Canadian professional basketball player for BC Andorra of the Spanish Liga ACB. He played college basketball for Ryerson.

== College career ==
Best played at Ryerson University (now Toronto Metropolitan University) and he graduated in 2016. At his last season he had 17,8 points and 7,4 rebounds per game.

== Professional career ==
Best started his professional career with the Lithuanian club BC Juventus. He has also played with the Raptors 905 in the G-League and Riesen Ludwigsburg in Germany. On September 2, 2019, he signed with Greek club PAOK Thessaloniki. Best signed with Boulazac of the LNB Pro A on July 28, 2020.

=== Second stint with Raptors 905 (2021—2022) ===
On December 30, 2021, Best was acquired via available player pool by the Raptors 905 of the NBA G League.

=== Hamilton Honey Badgers (2022–present) ===
On April 26, 2022, Best signed with the Hamilton Honey Badgers of the CEBL.

=== London Lions (2022–2023) ===
On August 13, 2022, he signed with London Lions of the British Basketball League (BBL).

=== Trefl Sopot (2023–2025) ===
On July 25, 2023, he signed with Trefl Sopot of the Polish Basketball League (PLK).

=== Scarborough Shooting Stars (2025) ===
On July 20, 2025, Best signed with the Scarborough Shooting Stars of the CEBL late in their season as the team pushed toward clinching a playoff berth.

=== MoraBanc Andorra (2025–present) ===
On July 14, 2025, he signed with MoraBanc Andorra of the Spanish Liga ACB.

== National team ==
Best was picked in the preliminary squad of Canada for the 2019 FIBA Basketball World Cup completing multiple legs, but he was ultimately cut from the final roster.
