= Milton Keynes College Lions basketball academy =

Milton Keynes College Lions
- League: British College Leagues
- Established: 2007
- History: First season of competition 2007/2008
- Arena: Milton Keynes College
- Location: Milton Keynes, Buckinghamshire
- Team colours: Black and gold
- Main sponsor: Milton Keynes Lions
- Head coach: (United States) Mike New
- Ownership: (United Kingdom) Milton Keynes College
Home	Away

The Milton Keynes Lions College Lions are a basketball academy team from Milton Keynes, England, with all players attending Milton Keynes College.The academy is coached, funded and run by a partnership between Milton Keynes College, and the 'London Lions' professional basketball team, who play in the British Basketball League.

The College academy team, is regarded throughout the British college leagues, as one of the best teams in the country, alongside Hackney Community College and Barking Abbey of East London.

The team achieved this status, after their 2008/2009 season (their second season), where they went undefeated in all SESSA competitions, winning the cup, knocking out Hackney in the process, and beating them twice in the league to top the table undefeated. They came second in the British Colleges Elite league to Hackney, losing once, and lost to Hackney in the Final of the British Colleges Cup, and reaching the Final Fours in the playoffs.

== Team history ==
=== Player development ===
In 2007/2008 several of the academy's squad began practicing with parent BBL club, Milton Keynes Lions with prospect Greg Harvey finding himself on the team's roster in the latter months of the season. Harvey rounded off his season with participation in the 2008 BBL Playoff Final vs Guildford Heat seeing playing minutes in both the 3rd and 4th quarters, picking up 1 foul and 1 rebound wearing the number 5 jersey.

=== Possible closure ===
In summer 2012 MK Lions announced they would be leaving Milton Keynes due to the closure of Prestige Homes Arena and fears were raised this could signal the closure of the basketball academy. On 8 August 2012 it was announced the BBL side would be moving to London for the 2012/13 season, with Mike New opting to remain in Milton Keynes as head coach of the academy side, turning down the opportunity to coach the new London Lions.

== Home court ==
Milton Keynes College

Notes:

- During the 2006/2007 academic year the Lions provided player Liam Court to coach twice weekly training sessions for students who played basketball with the view to a team playing in leagues and cups, however games were never organized.

== Trophies ==
=== Cups ===
- SESSA Cup 2008/2009, 2009/2010
- British Colleges Cup, Runners up 2008/2009

=== League ===
- SESSA Division 1 Champions 2008/2009 season (undefeated)
- British Colleges Elite League Runners up 2008/2009

=== Playoffs ===
- British Colleges Playoffs, Final Fours 2008/2009, 2009/2010

== See also ==
- Milton Keynes Breakers
