= London Lions (basketball) =

British professional basketball team

- Leagues: SLB; EuroCup
- Established: 1977; 49 years ago
- History: List: Hemel Hempstead Lakers 1977–1985 Hemel Royals 1985–1996 Hemel & Watford Royals 1996–1997 Watford Royals 1997–1998; Milton Keynes Lions; 1998–2012; London Lions; 2012–present
- Arena: Copper Box Arena
- Capacity: 6,000
- Location: Stratford, Greater London
- Team colours: Black, white, red, grey
- CEO: Lenz Balan
- General manager: Martynas Purlys
- Head coach: Tautvydas Sabonis
- Team captain: Ovie Soko
- Ownership: Tesonet
- Championships: 2 SLB Championship; 1 SLB Cup; 1 SLB Trophy; 3 BBL Championship; 2 BBL Playoffs; 3 BBL Cup; 1 BBL Trophy
- Website: Official website
Home	Away

The London Lions are a British professional basketball team based in Stratford, East London, England, and compete in the Super League Basketball (SLB) and in the EuroCup. The Lions relocated to London in 2012 and play their home games at the Copper Box Arena in the Queen Elizabeth Olympic Park, as well as occasional EuroCup matches at Wembley Arena.

The team was originally founded in 1977 as the Hemel Hempstead Lakers. Following an ownership take over by Vince Macaulay in 1993, the club subsequently relocated to Watford, and then Milton Keynes, where they were known as Milton Keynes Lions. It was in Milton Keynes that the team won its first silverware in 2008, the BBL Cup. The Lions were purchased by 777 Partners in 2020, ending Macaulay's 27-year tenure. After the threat of bankruptcy following their owners' collapse amid claims of financial fraud at the end of the 2023–24 season, the club was rescued for the 2024–25 season under the ownership of Tesonet, minority shareholders of BC Žalgiris.

== History ==
=== Hemel Hempstead Lakers ===
The club initially started out based in the town of Hemel Hempstead, 24 miles northwest of London, and were known as the Hemel Hempstead Lakers. The team was named after one of the National Basketball Association's (NBA) most famous teams, Los Angeles Lakers, and even adopted their colours of purple and gold. In 1977, the Lakers entered the National Basketball League's Division 2, and enjoyed a rather successful first season, finishing fifth (from 11 teams) with a 10–10 record. Their second season would be even more successful, with the Lakers finishing second in Division 2 (15–3) and winning promotion to the top-level league Division 1.

With entry into the country's top league ensured, the club received a sponsorship deal from beverage brand Ovaltine, and as part of the deal were known as Ovaltine Hemel Hempstead. The franchise began regularly finishing at the top-end of the table and making many appearances in the Play-off semi-finals at Wembley Arena, finishing third in 1981. Following the end of the Ovaltine sponsorship and a one-year deal with retailers Poundstretcher, the franchise was rebranded as the Hemel Royals in 1985. Meanwhile, on court, the team failed to reproduce the performances of the past few seasons and often settled for mid-table positions. Hemel regularly brought top American talent from the States. Dick Miller is the defensive player in the franchise. Harvey Knuckles is considered one of the greatest players ever to play in Britain. Steve Hale was a fourth round draft pick, Sam Smith scored big points from all round the court and Daryl Thomas was a prolific scorer.

For the 1989–1990 season the franchise opted to leave the top-tier (now known as the Carlsberg League due to sponsorship from the Carlsberg Group) and return to the second-tier league, which had been renamed as NBL Division 1. After only one season, and a fourth-place finish (14–8), the Royals returned to Carlsberg League. The team finished bottom of the league in the 1992–1993 season with a 4–29 record, and were subsequently relegated back to Division 1, however they were later reinstated and returned to the rebranded BBL for the following season. A dismal spell ensued and over the next decade the team wouldn't finish outside of the bottom three, but with the removal of the promotion/relegation system between the BBL and Division 1, this had little consequence.

=== Watford Royals ===
The lack of fortune and an aging venue prompted the franchise to look at relocating and the team found a suitable, yet temporary solution in the neighbouring town of Watford. In preparation for the move, the franchise was rebranded as Hemel & Watford Royals in 1996 and they made the move from the Dacorum Centre to Watford Leisure Centre in 1997. The move had little effect on the team's playing performance and they finished 13th out of 13 in the 1997–1998 season (3–33). Royals' stay in Watford lasted just one season and, in 1998, with the promise of a future purpose-built arena being offered in the town of Milton Keynes, the team packed up, moved and renamed themselves as the Milton Keynes Lions.

=== Milton Keynes Lions ===
Lions' on-court performances were an instant improvement and the franchise began a slow but noticeable turnaround, reaching the semi-finals of the National Cup and also the end-of-season Play-offs for the first time in eight seasons in 2000. After a hugely successful run, the franchise reached its first major final in 2002 with an appearance at the SkyDome Arena in the BBL Trophy. The Lions fought valiantly but eventually lost to the all-conquering Chester Jets, losing 90–89 in a close contest. From then on, the Lions remained a competitive force in the league, often qualifying for the post-season Play-offs (though having little impact on the outcome), and an appearance in the BBL Cup Semi-final in 2005 was considered to be a major landmark.

==== 2007–08 season ====
It was announced on 8 May 2007 that coach Tom Hancock would not coach the Lions for the 2007–08 season, after just one term at the helm. On 17 May, the club declared owner Vince Macaulay-Razaq, a former player and coach of the franchise, would be appointed head coach for the proceeding season. The signing of Yorick Williams during the pre-season was a massive coup, and for many fans signalled the dawning of a new era for the club. During this exciting time and in preparation for a planned move to a new arena, the club also undertook a rebranding initiative, redesigning the logo and changing the kit colours from the traditional purple and gold, to a more dynamic black, gold and white, as well as the establishment of a new academy in partnership with Milton Keynes College. The Milton Keynes College Lions Basketball Academy is headed by Lions' player Mike New.

With Macaulay back controlling the club on court as well as off it, the team's standing in the league was immediately matched to his own ambition as the club's owner. The veteran team performed sensationally and by the Christmas break they were well in contention for the league crown, resting in second place behind title-rivals Newcastle Eagles, who coincidentally they beat in their first-ever BBL Cup Final appearance at the National Indoor Arena (NIA), on 13 January 2008. Milton Keynes led for most of the game and sealed the 69–66 victory when New scored the final points of the game to end a Newcastle resurgence, handing the Lions franchise its first piece of silverware.

After finishing 4th in the league (19–14), Lions qualified for the post-season Play-offs with a seeded home-court Quarter-final tie against Scottish Rocks. The home team eased past the Rocks, 105–93, with the game filmed live in front of Setanta Sports cameras. For the first time in its history, Milton Keynes progressed to the Championship Finals weekend at the NIA where they defeated league champions Newcastle Eagles (63–72) on the way to the final eventually succumbing to Guildford Heat, 88–100, again live on Setanta Sports. The incredible achievements of the season, earned coach Macaulay-Razaq the accolade of BBL's Coach of the Year. Another highlight of the Lions' most successful season in history was the development of players through the new academy with 18-year-old Greg Harvey progressing onto the roster in the latter stages of the season.

==== 2008–09 season ====
As of 2008, Lions expected to be playing at the brand-new 4,500-seat capacity arena:mk adjacent to the new stadium:mk (home to Milton Keynes Dons football team). The move to their new home would have seen the Lions play in one of the BBL's biggest, modern venues, rivalling the homes of the Rocks and Newcastle. Unfortunately, the completion of the arena was delayed due to the deferral of proposed commercial developments around the site (which would have funded the project). With the demolition of Lions' current home, Bletchley Centre, scheduled for November 2009, the lack of an alternative venue raised question marks as to the future of the franchise remaining in Milton Keynes.

On court, there were big expectations following the successful campaign previously, but the 2008–09 season didn't start off too well for the Lions, with defeat to Guildford in the Cup Winners' Cup. After losing 91–89 in the first leg at Guildford, the Heat rolled over the Lions to a 68–60 victory at the Bletchley Centre, and a 159–149 series win. Further woe was added with a BBL Cup Quarter-final exit at the hands of visiting Everton Tigers, coupled with an exit at the 1st round of the Trophy. The disastrous season came to an abrupt end in April, with a 14–19 record and 9th-placed finish meaning the Lions missing out on the end-of-season Playoffs.

==== 2009–10 season ====
With the demolition of the Bletchley Centre looming, the club sought to find an alternative venue for home games and on 31 July 2009 announced that from January 2010, the Lions would be playing out of Middleton Hall at thecentre:mk as a temporary measure until the new arena:mk was due to be completed, later in the year. The Lions played their last game in front of a packed Bletchley Centre crowd on 18 December, with a dramatic 98–97 victory over Guildford Heat. Robert Youngblood scored the winning point from the free-throw line and thus scored the last basket for Lions at their former home.

After Middleton Hall decided upon changes that would no longer make it suitable for basketball, the Lions were forced yet again to search for another new home venue, for at least the 2010–2011 season. The club secured a three-game lease for an out-of-town venue at Stoke Mandeville in Aylesbury to begin their 2010–2011 campaign, and decided upon renovating a site in the centre of Milton Keynes to host home games for the duration of the season. A three-year deal was agreed upon to use a warehouse in Winterhill and convert it into a 1,400-seat basketball arena and practice venue. The venue opened as the MK Lions Arena at the end of November 2010.

==== 2010–11 season ====
In his first season as head coach, former Lions player Mike New led the team to a 10th-place finish in the British Basketball League. Despite now boasting a full-time basketball venue, which featured two permanent courts – allowing the teams throughout the Lions banner to train more frequently than previously – the club missed out on qualifying for the play-offs. One of the few highlights of the season was the play of American guard Demarius Bolds, who was among the league leaders in several statistics as he was named Lions' Player of the Year.

==== 2011–12 season ====
2011–12 saw the Lions miss the play-offs for a second successive season, as they finished 9th in the Championship table – one place and four points behind 8th-placed Guildford Heat for the last post-season berth. A heavy 102–67 defeat to Leicester saw elimination at the first hurdle in the BBL Cup, however the team would later go close to making the BBL Trophy final. After topping their group in round robin play, Lions won the home leg of their semi-final against Plymouth Raiders in front of a sold-out Prestige Homes Arena, before suffering a 188–186 defeat on aggregate (after OT) in the return leg. Success was however found on a personal level, as Nathan Schall won the BBL dunk competition as part of the BBL Cup Final festivities and Stefan Gill completed the dunking double as he was crowned dunk contest champion at the World Basketball Festival.

==== Departure from Milton Keynes ====
Following the conclusion of the 2011–12 season, the owners of Prestige Homes Arena triggered an opt-out clause in the lease to let the building as a retail outlet. A planning application to change the building from a sporting facility to retail unit was approved by Milton Keynes Council, thus leaving the club without a home venue for the third time in as many seasons. Owner Vince Macaulay searched during the summer of 2012 to secure a new base for Lions home games, which included public pleas to local businesses for help in finding a new home as offers from cities around the UK poured in to relocate the team. On 17 July, a local newspaper revealed negotiations to secure the Lions' future in Milton Keynes were ongoing, with Macaulay hoping to finalise a deal with sufficient time to begin preparation for the new season, slated to begin away to the re-formed Manchester Giants on 21 September. On 30 July, with the country's interest in basketball heightened by Great Britain's participation in the London 2012 Olympic basketball tournament, Macaulay revealed his search to find a home venue had been unsuccessful and the club would be forced to leave Milton Keynes. In addition to the loss of professional basketball games, the move was a big blow to Milton Keynes residents who had enjoyed extensive community and schools' basketball programmes since the Lions arrived in 1998. It was not then known what effect the team's departure would have on the many school teams and community projects, but Macaulay stated that he wished to remain involved in the development of youth basketball in Milton Keynes in some form. Questions also remained as to the future of the Milton Keynes Lions College Academy which enabled young adults to attend basketball practice five days a week whilst furthering their education – several of whom had gone on to sign professional deals with the first team.

When faced with the challenge of finding a new home outside of Milton Keynes, Macaulay shortlisted two new locations:

First was Cardiff, with Macaulay stating the appeal of every game feeling like Wales versus England being an exciting prospect. However, he ultimately found that agreeing to a deal with the proposed arena's owners would be unlikely before the deadline he was facing of the start of the next season.

Second was Liverpool, Macaulay's hometown. Liverpool already had a BBL franchise – the Mersey Tigers, however, they were in financial trouble so Macaulay proposed merging the two teams and a 50/50 ownership. The current owners were interested but wanted Macaulay to send them his CV. Somewhat offended, he knew such a working relationship was unlikely to work, so withdrew his proposal. The Mersey Tigers folded the following season.

Completely out of options during the summer of 2012, Macaulay noted a lot of talk about the legacy of the London 2012 Olympic Games and investigated whether there would be any venues that could potentially become home for a basketball team once the games were over. Ultimately he entered discussions with the new owners of the Copper Box Arena, and the Milton Keynes Lions, soon to be the London Lions, had a new home.

=== Move to London ===
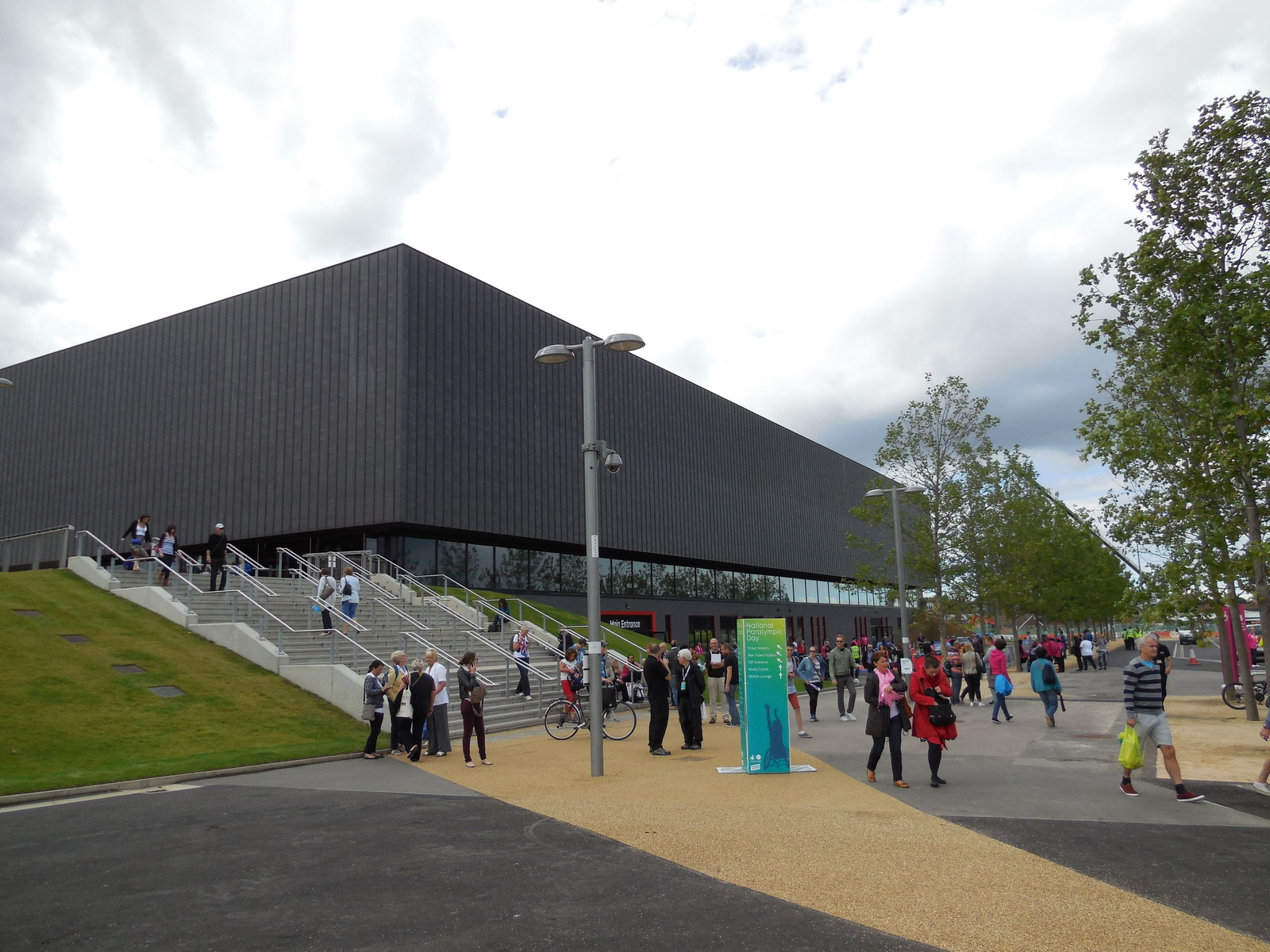
From 2013, the Lions play in the Copper Box Arena

London Lions logo (2020–2021)

On 8 August 2012, an article in the Milton Keynes Citizen newspaper revealed the Lions would be moving to London for the 2012–13 season, taking residence at the Copper Box Arena in the Queen Elizabeth Olympic Park. As the Copper Box was being used for handball during the 2012 Summer Olympics and goalball during the 2012 Summer Paralympics, the venue needed to be converted for basketball use, and the Lions, therefore, began the season playing home games at Crystal Palace National Sports Centre. Owner Vince Macaulay-Razaq revealed the Lions would maintain links in Milton Keynes by keeping the Milton Keynes College Lions Basketball Academy open.

==== 2012–13 season ====
Following the Lions' move to London, head coach Mike New elected to remain in Milton Keynes and continue his work as head coach of the Milton Keynes College Lions Basketball Academy. Lions owner Vince Macaulay coached the team for the 2012–13 season. London Lions played its home games at Crystal Palace National Sports Centre until the Copper Box Arena had been converted for basketball use following its role as handball arena during the London 2012 Olympic Games.

==== 2013–14 season ====
London Lions was successfully launched as the only professional basketball club in London. The team finished 6th in the regular season before losing to Worcester Wolves in the playoffs quarter-finals.

==== 2014–15 season ====
The two previous seasons' BBL MVPs, Drew Sullivan and Zaire Taylor, were recruited for the 2014–15 season. The Lions reached the semi-finals of the BBL Trophy, losing to Leicester Riders. They finished 6th in the regular season. In the playoffs, the Lions defeated Worcester Wolves in the quarter-finals and Cheshire Phoenix in the semi-finals. The final, played in front of 14,700 at The O2 Arena, was won by Newcastle Eagles, who completed the clean sweep of British basketball titles.

==== 2015–16 season ====
Nigel Lloyd took over as head coach for the 2015–16 season. Joe Ikhinmwin, the only senior player retained from the previous season's run to the play-off final, was made captain. Olumide Oyedeji would later rejoin in October following a serious injury to Demond Watt. Alex Owumi signed in December following further roster changes. The season ended with defeat to Sheffield Sharks in the play-off quarter-finals, on their way to winning the trophy.

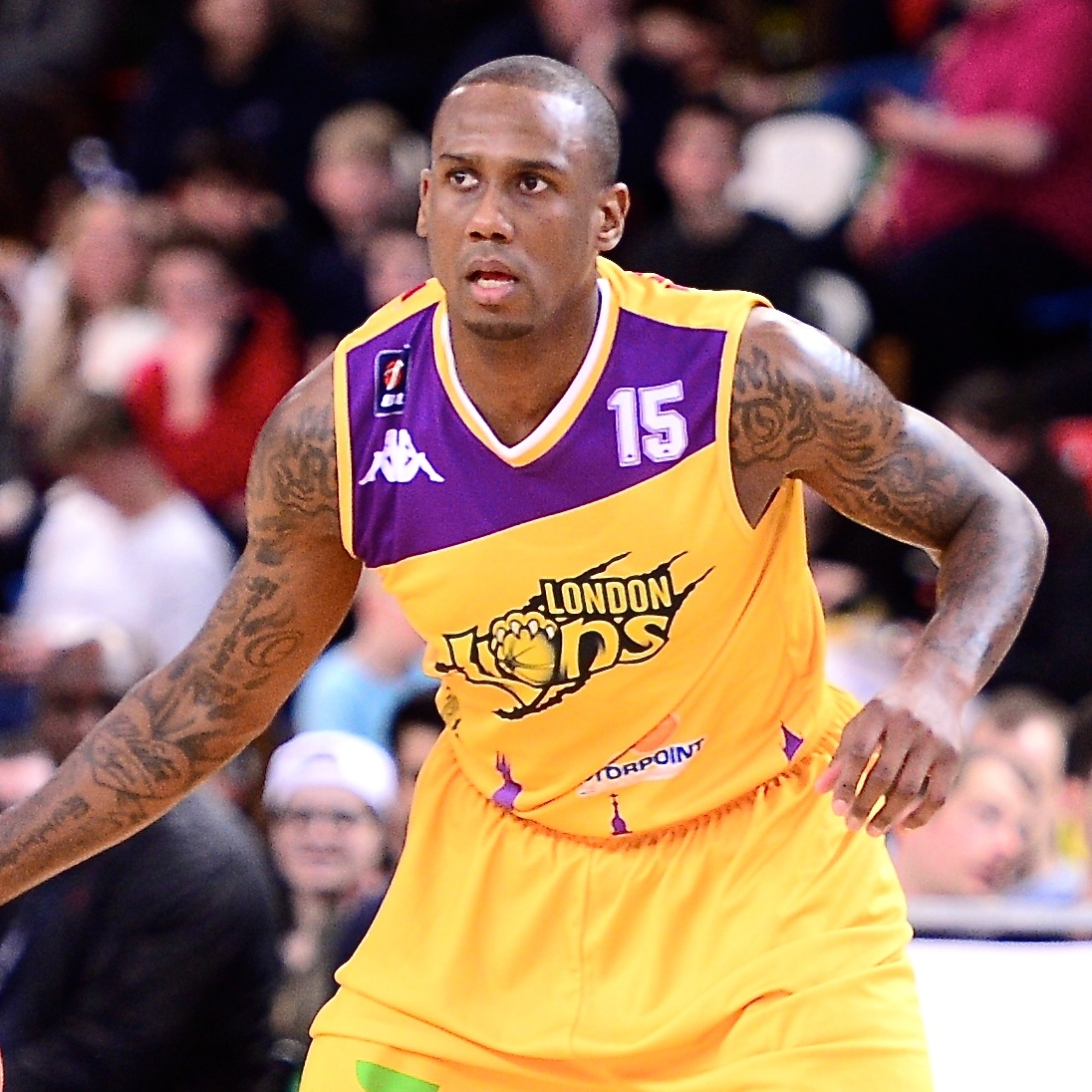
Alex Owumi played for Lions from 2015 to 2017

==== 2016–17 season ====
A more stable summer saw Nigel Lloyd remain in charge, bringing back Alex Owumi, Andre Lockhart, Jamal Williams, Joseph "Jei" Blessing Ikhinmwin and Kai Williams. Zaire Taylor also returned after a year away, along with Derek Hall and Rashad Hassan. A 9–1 start to the season in all competitions suggested great promise, but the departure of Hall after only 3 games and a season-ending injury to Jamal Williams disrupted the team's form. Defeat to Newcastle Eagles in the BBL Cup followed shortly afterwards. Reinforcements arrived in the shape of Navid Niktash and Zak Wells but the early season form couldn't be recaptured.

==== 2017–18 season ====
After Lloyd stepped down as head coach at the beginning of the 17–18 season, Mariusz Karol was appointed as head coach and lead the team to a 9–3 start before losing 4 out of the next 6. This led to a mutual agreement with team management for him to step down as head coach and club director / owner Vince Macaulay-Razaq to become head coach.

==== 2018–19 season ====
The team won its first silverware since rebranding as London Lions, beating Glasgow Rocks in the BBL Cup Final. They were beaten in the BBL Trophy Final by London City Royals, before winning the BBL league championship. Justin Robinson won his second BBL MVP award in a row.

==== 2019–20 season ====
Lions changed their colours from their traditional purple and gold to black, silver and white. The season was curtailed prematurely due to the COVID-19 pandemic, with no champions being named.

=== European debut ===
In the 2020–21 season, the Lions played in a European competition for the first time in club history. They were confirmed to have a spot in the qualifying rounds for the fifth season of the Basketball Champions League (BCL). however they failed to qualify for the tournament proper, losing 77–73 to Neptūnas in the single game qualifying tie.

London Lions were acquired by 777 Partners, after they purchased the club from Macaulay, ending his 27-year ownership. 777 Partners also purchased 45% of the British Basketball League (BBL) for £7m in December 2021. The balance of BBL is owned by the 10 clubs that compete in the BBL, including London, therefore, effectively 777 controls the BBL.

In the 2021–22 season, the Lions made their debut in the FIBA Europe Cup, which meant their debut in the group phase of a European competition. On 13 October 2021, the Lions beat Donar Groningen away to register their first-ever European win.

=== EuroCup debut ===
London Lions logo (2021–2025)

In the 2022–23 season the London Lions appeared in the Eurocup for the first time, reaching the playoffs but being knocked out in the first round.

In the 2023–24 season the Lions went further, reaching the semi-finals of Europe's second-tier competition, becoming the first British team to do so. The Lions were beaten by heavy tournament favourites Paris Basketball.

In June 2024, it was confirmed that Lions would be omitted from the 2024-25 EuroCup season due to the club's uncertain financial stability, while later it was revealed that the club was at risk of bankruptcy. In August 2024, it was announced that Lithuanian tech company Tesonet, shareholder of BC Žalgiris as well, acquired the club from 777 Partners. The Žalgiris Group would provide a three-month loan to cover "essential costs".

=== First SLB season ===
The Lions announced that forward Aaryn Rai would be joining the club from rivals Cheshire Phoenix. He was joined by former Lion Ovie Soko, returnees Jordan Taylor, and Ciaran Sandy as well as new signings Alen Hardzibeggovic, Michael Brisker, Jaiden Delaire and Matthew Goodwin.

A shaky start to the season saw the Lions exit the SLB Trophy at the group stage, before bowing out of the SLB Cup in the quarterfinals following an 86-95 defeat to the Surrey 89ers. The Lions won the regular season, clinching the league title with a 97-80 win over fellow title contenders Leicester Riders. After easing past the 89ers in the quarterfinals of the playoffs, the Lions unexpectedly lost both the home and away fixtures to fifth seed Newcastle, exiting at the semifinals.

Following the defeat, Coach Božić announced he would be leaving the club.

== Home arenas ==
Lions at the Crystal Palace National Sports Centre

- Dacorum Leisure Centre (1977–1997)
- Watford Leisure Centre (1997–1998)
- Bletchley Centre (1998–2009)
- Middleton Hall (thecentre:mk) (2010)
- Prestige Homes Arena (2010–2012)
- Crystal Palace National Sports Centre (2012–2013)
- Copper Box Arena (2013–present)

Note: Between 1998 and 2002, some home games were played at Planet Ice Milton Keynes for TV broadcasting purposes. Between 2017 and 2020, some home games were played at University of East London SportsDock and Brixton Recreation Centre. In the 2022–23 season, some European home games were played at Wembley Arena.

== Season-by-season records ==
Seasons 1977–2012
Season	Div.	Pos.	Pld.	W	L	Pts.	Play-offs	Trophy	Cup
Hemel Hempstead Lakers
1977–1978	NBL 2	5th	20	10	10	20	n/a	-	1st round
1978–1979	NBL 2	2nd	18	15	3	30	n/a	-	-
1979–1980	NBL 1	4th	18	12	6	24	4th place	-	Quarter-final
1980–1981	NBL 1	3rd	18	13	5	26	3rd place	-	2nd round
1981–1982	NBL 1	6th	22	12	10	24	DNQ	-	Quarter-final
1982–1983	NBL 1	3rd	24	18	6	36	4th place	-	Quarter-final
1983–1984	NBL 1	11th	36	12	24	24	DNQ	-	2nd round
1984–1985	NBL 1	7th	26	15	11	30	Quarter-final	Semi-final	2nd round
Hemel Royals
1985–1986	NBL 1	9th	28	13	15	26	DNQ	2nd round	2nd round
1986–1987	NBL 1	8th	23	8	15	16	Quarter-final	2nd round	Quarter-final
1987–1988	BBL	11th	28	9	19	18	DNQ	1st round	Quarter-final
1988–1989	BBL	7th	20	9	11	18	Quarter-final	1st round	Semi-final
1989–1990	NBL 1	4th	22	14	8	28	Semi-final	Semi-final	1st round
1990–1991	BBL	8th	24	4	20	8	Quarter-final	1st round	2nd round
1991–1992	BBL	7th	30	13	17	26	Quarter-final	1st round	3rd round
1992–1993	BBL	12th	33	4	29	8	DNQ	1st round	3rd round
1993–1994	BBL	12th	36	3	33	6	DNQ	1st round	3rd round
1994–1995	BBL	10th	36	9	27	18	DNQ	1st round	4th round
1995–1996	BBL	13th	36	6	30	12	DNQ	1st round	Quarter-final
Hemel & Watford Royals
1996–1997	BBL	13th	36	2	34	4	DNQ	1st round	4th round
Watford Royals
1997–1998	BBL	13th	36	3	33	6	DNQ	1st round	4th round
Milton Keynes Lions
1998–1999	BBL	10th	36	10	26	20	DNQ	1st round	1st round
1999–2000	BBL S	4th	34	15	19	30	Quarter-final	1st round	Semi-final
2000–2001	BBL S	3rd	34	21	13	42	1st round	Quarter-final	1st round
2001–2002	BBL S	3rd	32	16	16	32	Quarter-final	Runner-up	Quarter-final
2002–2003	BBL	8th	40	12	28	24	Quarter-final	1st round	1st round
2003–2004	BBL	8th	36	13	23	26	Quarter-final	1st round	Quarter-final
2004–2005	BBL	8th	40	15	25	30	Quarter-final	1st round	Semi-final
2005–2006	BBL	10th	40	16	24	32	DNQ	1st round	Quarter-final
2006–2007	BBL	6th	36	18	18	36	Quarter-final	1st round	Quarter-final
2007–2008	BBL	4th	33	19	14	38	Runner-up	1st round	Winners
2008–2009	BBL	9th	33	14	19	28	Did not qualify	1st round	Quarter-final
2009–2010	BBL	7th	36	18	18	36	1st round	Semi-final	Semi-final
2010–2011	BBL	10th	33	13	20	26	Did not qualify	1st round	1st round
2011–2012	BBL	9th	30	10	20	20	Did not qualify	Semi-final	1st round

Seasons 2012–2024
Season	Division	Tier	Regular Season						Post-Season	Trophy	Cup	Head coach
Season	Division	Tier	Finish	Played	Wins	Losses	Points	Win %	Post-Season	Trophy	Cup	Head coach
London Lions
2012–13	BBL	1	8th	33	13	20	26	0.394	Quarter-final	1st round (BT)	Quarter-final (BC)	Vince Macaulay
2013–14	BBL	1	6th	33	16	17	32	0.485	Quarter-final	1st round (BT)	1st round (BC)	Vince Macaulay
2014–15	BBL	1	6th	36	21	15	42	0.583	Runners Up, losing to Newcastle	Semi-final (BT)	1st round (BC)	Vince Macaulay
2015–16	BBL	1	6th	33	16	17	32	0.485	Quarter-final	1st round (BT)	Semi-final (BC)	Nigel Lloyd
2016–17	BBL	1	6th	33	18	15	36	0.545	Semi-final	1st round (BT)	Semi-final (BC)	Nigel Lloyd
2017–18	BBL	1	2nd	33	23	10	46	0.697	Runners Up, losing to Leicester	Semi-final (BT)	Semi-final (BC)	Mariusz Karol; Vince Macaulay
2018–19	BBL	1	1st	33	27	6	54	0.818	Quarter-final	Runners Up, losing to London Royals	Winners, beating Glasgow	Vince Macaulay
2019–20	BBL	1	Season cancelled due to COVID-19 pandemic							1st round (BT)	Quarter-final (BC)	Vince Macaulay
2020–21	BBL	1	2nd	30	23	7	46	0.767	Runners Up, losing to Newcastle	Winners, beating Plymouth	Runners Up, losing to Newcastle	Vince Macaulay
2021–22	BBL	1	3rd	27	16	11	32	0.593	Runners Up, losing to Leicester	Runners Up, losing to Cheshire	Semi-final (BC)	Vince Macaulay; James Vear; Nikhil Lawry
2022–23	BBL	1	1st	36	32	4	64	0.889	Winners, beating Leicester	Quarter-final (BT)	Winners, beating Leicester	Ryan Schmidt
2023–24	BBL	1	1st	36	33	3	66	0.917	Winners, beating Cheshire	Runners Up, losing to Cheshire		Petar Božić

=== SLB season-by-season ===
Champions	SLB champions	Runners-up	Playoff berth

Season	Tier	League	Regular season					Postseason	Cup	Trophy	Head coach
Season	Tier	League	Finish	Played	Wins	Losses	Win %	Postseason	Cup	Trophy	Head coach
London Lions
2024–25	1	SLB	1st	32	24	8	.750	Semifinals	Quarterfinals	Did not qualify	Petar Božić
2025–26	1	SLB	1st	32	26	6	.813	Champions	Champions	Champions	Tautvydas Sabonis
Championship record				64	50	14	.781	2 championships			
Playoff record				9	7	2	.778	1 playoff championships			

== Honours ==
=== Championship ===
- SLB Championship
  - Winners: (2) 2024–25, 2025–26
- BBL Championship
  - Winners: (3) 2018–19, 2022–23, 2023–24
  - Runners-up: (2) 2017–18, 2020–21
- NBL Second Division
  - Runners-up: 1 (1978–79)

=== Playoffs ===
- SLB Play-offs
  - Winners: (1) 2025–26
- BBL Play-offs
  - Winners: (2) 2022–23, 2023–24
  - Runners-up: (5) 2007–08, 2014–15, 2017–18, 2020–21, 2021–22

=== Trophy ===
- SLB Trophy
  - Winners: (1) 2025–26
- BBL Trophy
  - Winners: (1) 2020–21
  - Runners-up: (4) 2001–02, 2018–19, 2021–22, 2023–24

=== Cup ===
- SLB Cup
  - Winners: (1) 2025–26
- BBL Cup
  - Winners: (3) 2007–08, 2018–19, 2022–23
  - Runners-up: (1) 2020–21

== Players ==
=== Current roster ===
Note: Flags indicate national team eligibility at FIBA-sanctioned events. Players may hold other non-FIBA nationalities not displayed.

London Lions roster
Players
Coaches

Pos.	No.	Nat.	Name	Ht.	Wt.	Age
F	1	(United States)	Scott, Joel	2.01 m (6 ft 7 in)	102 kg (225 lb)	25 – 19 April 2001
F	2	(United States)	Lewis, Maxwell	2.01 m (6 ft 7 in)	98 kg (216 lb)	24 – 27 July 2002
PG	3	(United States)	Jones, DeVante'	1.83 m (6 ft 0 in)	86 kg (190 lb)	28 – 9 April 1998
G	5	(United Kingdom)	Adebayo, Ade	1.96 m (6 ft 5 in)	93 kg (205 lb)	25 – 2 December 2000
G/F	6	(United Kingdom)	Soluade, Mo	1.96 m (6 ft 5 in)	89 kg (196 lb)	31 – 12 July 1995
G/F	7	(United Kingdom)	O'Garro, Josh	1.98 m (6 ft 6 in)	79 kg (174 lb)	25 – 18 September 2001
SF	8	(Lithuania) (United Kingdom)	Zibuda, Emilis	1.98 m (6 ft 6 in)	82 kg (181 lb)	18 – 12 February 2008
C	10	(United Kingdom)	Price, Ethan	2.08 m (6 ft 10 in)	104 kg (229 lb)	25 – 1 October 2001
G	13	(United States)	Shackelford, Jaden	1.91 m (6 ft 3 in)	91 kg (201 lb)	25 – 14 February 2001
SF	21	(Canada) (United Kingdom)	Rai, Aaryn	1.98 m (6 ft 6 in)	98 kg (216 lb)	28 – 20 July 1998
PG	22	(United Kingdom) (United States)	Phillip, Tarik	1.91 m (6 ft 3 in)	87 kg (192 lb)	33 – 10 August 1993
G	23	(United States)	Horton, Landrius	1.93 m (6 ft 4 in)	86 kg (190 lb)	28 – 31 July 1998
F/C	31	(United Kingdom)	Williams, Deane	2.03 m (6 ft 8 in)	103 kg (227 lb)	30 – 23 September 1996
F/C	54	(Canada)	Kennedy, Thomas	2.06 m (6 ft 9 in)	100 kg (220 lb)	26 – 1 September 2000
PG	55	(Lithuania)	Grunkis, Dominykas	1.83 m (6 ft 0 in)	70 kg (154 lb)	19 – 5 February 2007

Head coach

- (Lithuania) Tautvydas Sabonis

Assistant coach(es)

- (Lithuania) Vytautas Pliauga
- (Turkey) Polat Kaya
- (United Kingdom) Robert Youngblood

Legend

- (C) Team captain
- (DP) Development player
- (IN) Inactive
- (I) Import player
- Injured

- Roster
Updated: 17 November 2026

=== Depth chart ===
Pos.	Starting 5	Bench 1	Bench 2	Bench 3
C	Thomas Kennedy	Ethan Price
PF	Deane Williams	Maxwell Lewis
SF	Joel Scott	Emilis Zibuda	Aaryn Rai	Mo Soluade
SG	Josh O'Garro	Ade Adebayo		Jaden Shackelford
PG	Landrius Horton	Dominykas Grunkis	DeVante' Jones	Tarik Phillip

=== Squad changes for/during the 2026–27 season ===
==== In ====
No.	Pos.	Nat.	Name	Moving from	
8	SF	(Lithuania) (United Kingdom)	Emilis Zibuda		
54	F/C	(Canada)	Thomas Kennedy	Cedevita Olimpija	(Slovenia)
2	F	(United States)	Maxwell Lewis	Žalgiris Kaunas	(Lithuania)
3	PG	(United States)	DeVante' Jones	Dolomiti Energia Trento	(Italy)
7	G/F	(United Kingdom)	Josh O'Garro	Cal State Northridge Matadors	(United States)
23	G	(United States)	Landrius Horton	Dziki Warsaw	(Poland)
12	G	(United States)	Keenan Evans	Olympiacos	(Greece)
5	G	(United Kingdom)	Ade Adebayo	Cultural y Deportiva Leonesa	(Spain)
55	PG	(Lithuania)	Dominykas Grunkis	Žalgiris Kaunas	(Lithuania)
13	G	(United States)	Jaden Shackelford	Tianjin Pioneers	(China)

==== Out ====
No.	Pos.	Nat.	Name	Moving to	
3	F/C	(United Kingdom)	Ciaran Sandy	Manchester Basketball	(United Kingdom)
0	F	(United Kingdom)	Ovie Soko	Retired	
4	PF	(United Kingdom)	Jordan Williams	Free Agent	
33	G	(United States)	Shavar Reynolds Jr.	Tofaş	(Turkey)
15	G/F	(United States)	Chaundee Brown Jr.	Fukui Blowinds	(Japan)
23	G/F	(United States)	Kameron McGusty	Yokohama B-Corsairs	(Japan)
5	G	(United Kingdom)	Amin Adamu	Kortrijk Spurs	(Netherlands)
16	G/F	(Lithuania)	Karolis Lukošiūnas	Šiauliai	(Lithuania)
12	G	(United States)	Keenan Evans	Žalgiris Kaunas	(Lithuania)
55	G	(United Kingdom)	Matt Goodwin	Central Connecticut Blue Devils	(United States)

== Notable players ==
- (United Kingdom) Amin Adamu
- (United Kingdom) Gabriel Olaseni
- (United Kingdom) Tarik Phillip
- (United Kingdom) Justin Robinson
- (United Kingdom) Ovie Soko
- (United Kingdom) Drew Sullivan
- (United Kingdom) Joshua Ward-Hibbert
- (United Kingdom) Deane Williams
- (United Kingdom) Yorick Williams
- (Lithuania) Rokas Gustys
- (Lithuania) Karolis Lukošiūnas
- (Lithuania) Aurimas Majauskas
- (Greece) Kosta Koufos
- (Germany) Moritz Lanegger
- (United States) Sam Dekker
- (United States) Keenan Evans
- (United States) Kylor Kelley
- (United States) Maxwell Lewis
- (United States) David Nwaba
- (United States) Marquis Teague

== Head coaches ==
- (United Kingdom) Vince Macaulay: 2007–2011, 2014–2022
- (United Kingdom) Michael New: 2011–2012
- (United States) Ryan Schmidt: 2022–2023
- (Serbia) Petar Božić: 2023–2025
- (Lithuania) Tautvydas Sabonis: 2025–present

== European matches ==
=== Matches ===
Season	Competition	Round	Club	Home	Away	Aggregate
1989–90	FIBA Korać Cup	R1	(Iceland) Knattspyrnufélag Reykjavíkur	60–65	53–45	105–118
2020–21	Basketball Champions League	QD	(Lithuania) Neptūnas	77–73		—N/a
2021–22	Basketball Champions League	QB	(Italy) Treviso	62–89		—N/a
2021–22	FIBA Europe Cup	RS	(Austria) Kapfenberg Bulls	68–58	81–100	2nd in Group A
2021–22	FIBA Europe Cup	RS	(Germany) Bayreuth	91–81	97–78	2nd in Group A
2021–22	FIBA Europe Cup	RS	(Netherlands) Donar	85–67	60–79	2nd in Group A
2021–22	FIBA Europe Cup	R2	(Russia) Avtodor	77–104	84–81	4th in Group L
2021–22	FIBA Europe Cup	R2	(Denmark) Bakken Bears	82–75	95–80	4th in Group L
2021–22	FIBA Europe Cup	R2	(Turkey) Bahçeşehir Koleji	61–76	107–82	4th in Group L
2022–23	EuroCup	RS	(Israeli Basketball Association) Hapoel Tel Aviv	93–95	76–59	7th in Group A
2022–23	EuroCup	RS	(Spanish Basketball Federation) Gran Canaria	57–60	87–69	7th in Group A
2022–23	EuroCup	RS	(Basketball Federation of Montenegro) Budućnost VOLI	78–87	78–68	7th in Group A
2022–23	EuroCup	RS	(Italian Basketball Federation) Dolomiti Energia Trento	80–75	70–84	7th in Group A
2022–23	EuroCup	RS	(Turkish Basketball Federation) Türk Telekom	84–89	102–74	7th in Group A
2022–23	EuroCup	RS	(Hellenic Basketball Federation) Promitheas	89–93	67–77	7th in Group A
2022–23	EuroCup	RS	(French Federation of Basketball) Paris Basketball	80–93	85–96	7th in Group A
2022–23	EuroCup	RS	(German Basketball Federation) Hamburg Towers	83–66	75–103	7th in Group A
2022–23	EuroCup	RS	(Polish Basketball Federation) Śląsk Wrocław	97–80	76–83	7th in Group A
2022–23	EuroCup	EF	(Spanish Basketball Federation) Joventut	89–78		
2023–24	EuroCup	RS	(Turkish Basketball Federation) Beşiktaş Emlakjet	93–72	80–83	3rd in Group A
2023–24	EuroCup	RS	(Basketball Federation of Slovenia) Cedevita Olimpija	101–95	85–92	3rd in Group A
2023–24	EuroCup	RS	(Israeli Basketball Association) Hapoel Tel Aviv	90–98	96–100	3rd in Group A
2023–24	EuroCup	RS	(Spanish Basketball Federation) Joventut Badalona	80–82	76–87	3rd in Group A
2023–24	EuroCup	RS	(French Federation of Basketball) Paris Basketball	102–106	94–77	3rd in Group A
2023–24	EuroCup	RS	(Basketball Federation of Ukraine) Prometey	89–88	87–99	3rd in Group A
2023–24	EuroCup	RS	(Italian Basketball Federation) Umana Reyer Venezia	76–69	91–95	3rd in Group A
2023–24	EuroCup	RS	(German Basketball Federation) Veolia Towers Hamburg	81–83	94–100	3rd in Group A
2023–24	EuroCup	RS	(Lithuanian Basketball Federation) Wolves	80–85	87–100	3rd in Group A
2023–24	EuroCup	EF	(Turkish Basketball Federation) Türk Telekom	100–77		
2023–24	EuroCup	QF	(Romanian Basketball Federation) U-BT Cluj-Napoca	79–91		
2023–24	EuroCup	SF	(French Federation of Basketball) Paris Basketball	85–93	99–86	0–2
2025–26	EuroCup	RS	(Basketball Federation of Montenegro) Budućnost VOLI	59–86	94–63	8th in Group B
2025–26	EuroCup	RS	(Turkish Basketball Federation) Beşiktaş Emlakjet	98–96	99–73	8th in Group B
2025–26	EuroCup	RS	(Italian Basketball Federation) Dolomiti Energia Trento	87–71	85–73	8th in Group B
2025–26	EuroCup	RS	(German Basketball Federation) Niners Chemnitz	70–78	67–68	8th in Group B
2025–26	EuroCup	RS	(Turkish Basketball Federation) Türk Telekom	77–89	88–63	8th in Group B
2025–26	EuroCup	RS	(German Basketball Federation) ratiopharm Ulm	72–73	87–86	8th in Group B
2025–26	EuroCup	RS	(Hellenic Basketball Federation) Panionios Cosmorama Travel	97–72	79–78	8th in Group B
2025–26	EuroCup	RS	(French Federation of Basketball) Cosea JL Bourg	68–72	86–85	8th in Group B
2025–26	EuroCup	RS	(Lithuanian Basketball Federation) Lietkabelis	58–66	61–74	8th in Group B

Notes

- QB: Qualification Group B
- QD: Qualification Group D
- RS: Regular season
- R1: First round
- R2: Second round
- EF: Eighthfinals
- QF: Quarterfinals
- SF: Semifinals

== See also ==
- London Lions (women)
- British Basketball League
- Milton Keynes College Lions Basketball Academy
- Milton Keynes Breakers
