= Woughton =

Civil parish in Milton Keynes, England

Coordinates: 52.0267°N 0.7395°W

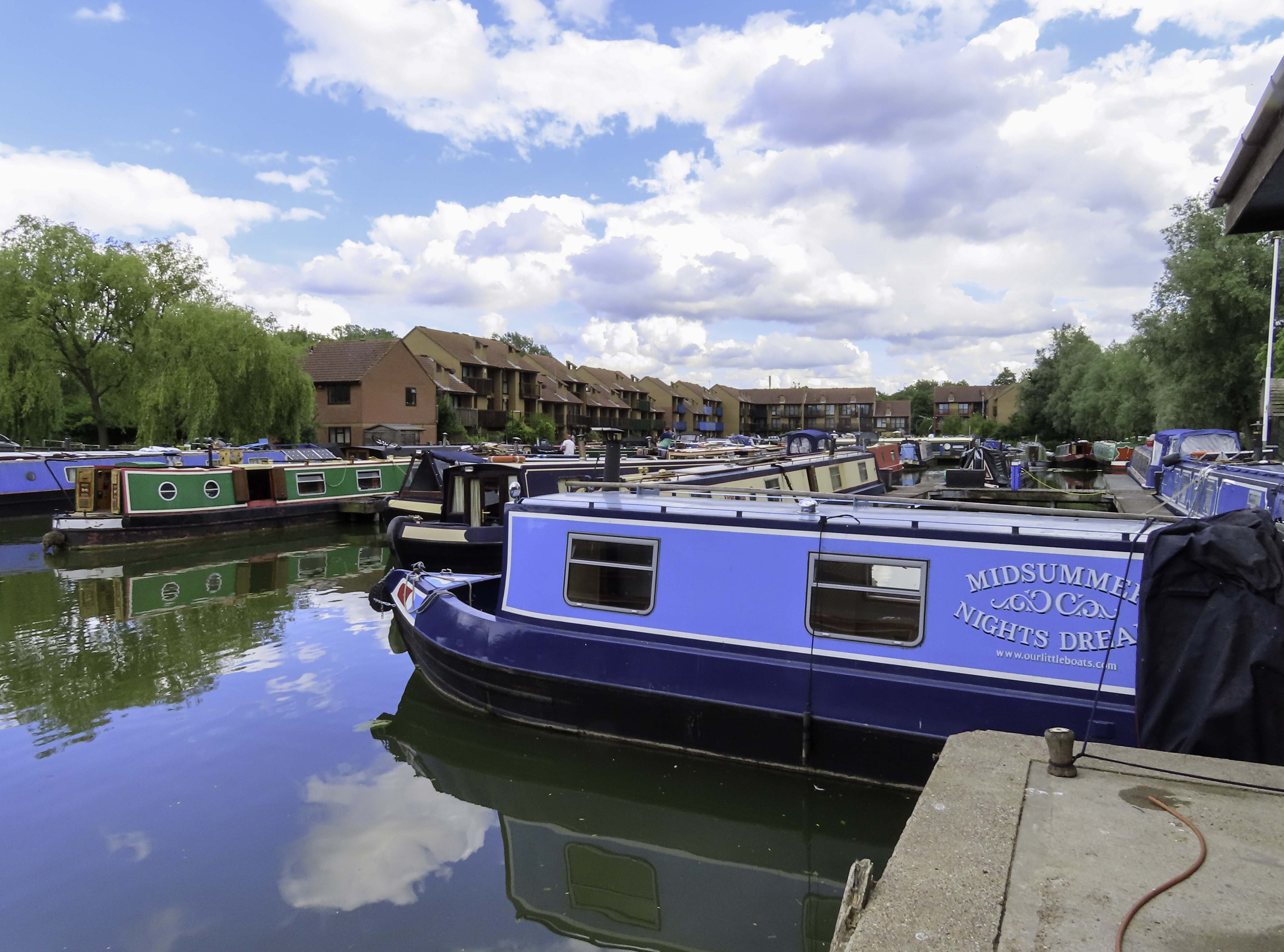
- The marina to the south of Peartree Bridge

- Location within Buckinghamshire
- Woughton parish
- Population: 13,433 (2021 census)
- OS grid reference: SP876369
- Civil parish: Woughton
- Unitary authority: Milton Keynes City Council
- Ceremonial county: Buckinghamshire
- Region: South East
- Country: England
- Sovereign state: United Kingdom
- Post town: MILTON KEYNES
- Postcode district: MK6
- Dialling code: 01908
- Police: Thames Valley
- Fire: Buckinghamshire
- Ambulance: South Central
- UK Parliament: Milton Keynes Central
- Website: woughtoncommunitycouncil.gov.uk

Woughton (/ˈwʊftən/ WUUF-tən), formerly called Woughton on the Green, is a civil parish in south central Milton Keynes, Buckinghamshire, England. The parish council uses the term Community Council.

The original civil parish took its name from the ecclesiastic parish of Woughton and the village of Woughton on the Green that it contained. In 2012, it was divided into two distinct civil parishes – this parish and another called Old Woughton (which includes the village). On 1 January 2025, after having retained the historic name over twelve years despite the loss of the eponymous village, the parish was renamed from "Woughton on the Green" to "Woughton".

== Geography and settlements of the parish ==
The current boundaries of the parish run from the Netherfield Roundabout (H8/V8), south along the V8 (Marlborough Street) to the roundabout (H9/V8), then west along the Groveway H9 until it reaches the intersection with the A5. It broadly follows the line of the A5 north until it passes underneath Chafron Way H7. It then runs east along the H7 before returning to the Netherfield Roundabout (H8/V8).

The parish comprises the communities of Beanhill, Coffee Hall, Eaglestone, Leadenhall, Netherfield, Peartree Bridge and Tinkers Bridge. Additionally, there are two industrial areas: Bleak Hall and Redmoor.

=== Beanhill ===
The building of the Beanhill area of Milton Keynes started in 1973/1974 during a strike by brick makers. Hence phase one was constructed with timber frames with corrugated cladding. The later phase two bungalows are brick-built. From the original build, with the exception of the roads Capron and Simnel (which have two-storey houses), the rest of the residential buildings were all bungalows. After construction every new home came with a voucher from the Milton Keynes Development Corporation (MKDC), allowing the new occupants to choose and plant a tree sapling. More recently, more roads and buildings have been slotted in. For example, the land where Bracken House now stands was originally allotments. In 1989. phase three introduced 35 shared ownership homes in the Wheatcroft Close area.

In keeping with the 1970s Milton Keynes culture there were various arts projects within the Beanhill community. Notably the underpass painted in the Wizard of Oz theme, which was between Beanhill and Coffee Hall, at the back of Lammas. The Toadstools, created by Sue McFarland, on the field behind Simnel, are still there. In Beanhill's very early days there was also a street theatre based there called The Beanhill Flat Earth Society. They performed around MK.

Beanhill has local shops, a meeting place, a medical centre, and a first school and a nursery, both called Moorlands, although on different sites.

=== Bleak Hall ===
This district, next to the West Coast Main Line, is dedicated to light industry, construction industry supply and 'big shed' retail. The name Bleak Hall derives from a nearby farm. The streets of Bleak Hall are named after characters and places in the book Bleak House by Charles Dickens.

=== Coffee Hall ===
Coffee Hall consists of council and privately owned housing and a local shopping centre, including a church and a few shops. Coffee Hall also has a primary school and Coffee Tots childcare provision. The parish offices are also based on the estate, behind the shops at the local centre, having moved from Netherfield in 2017. Coffee Hall is located between Leadenhall, Eaglestone, Netherfield and Beanhill. The roads in Coffee Hall are all named after old London coffee houses.

=== Eaglestone ===
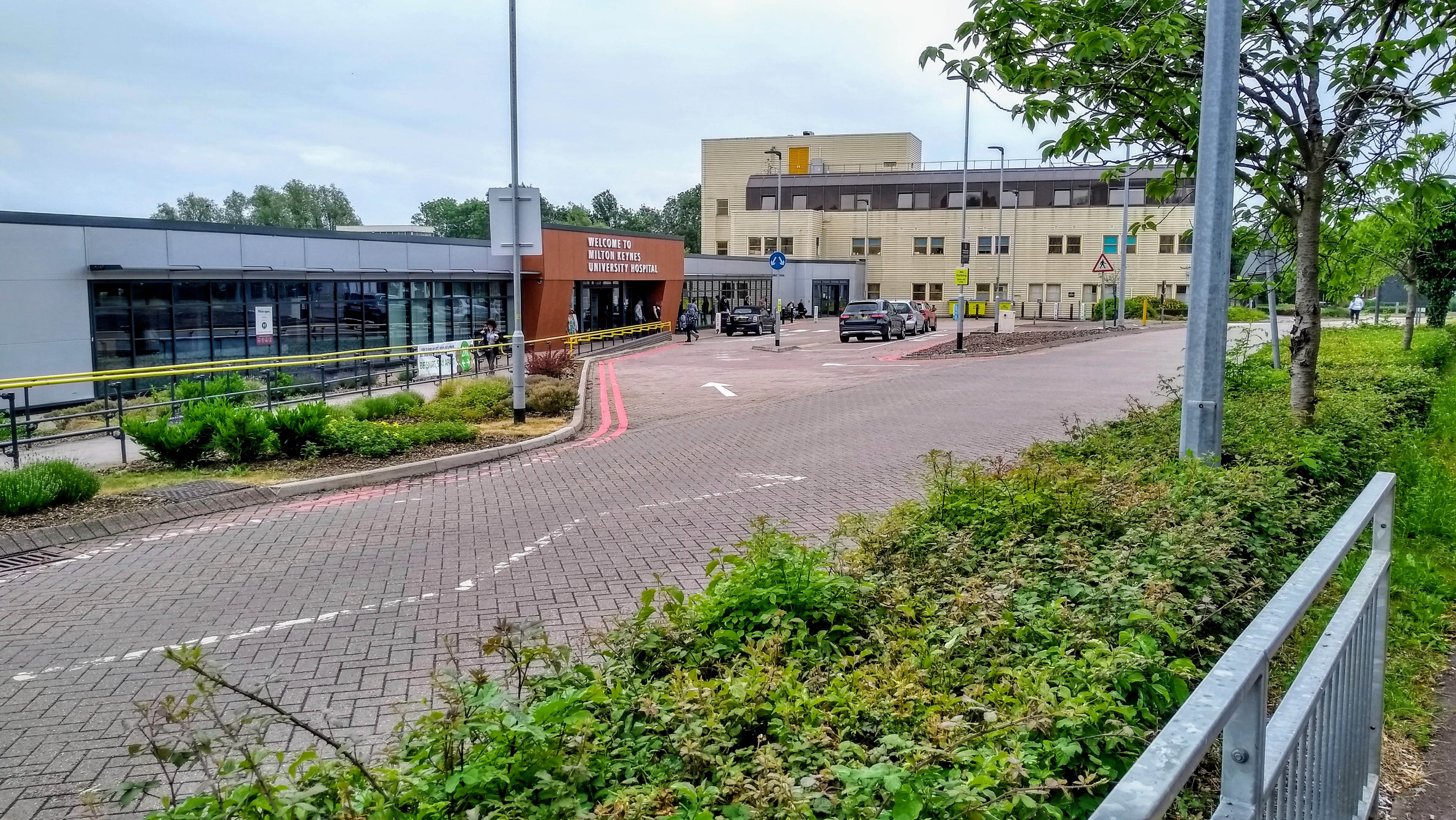
MKUH main entrance (2019)

Eaglestone is home to Milton Keynes University Hospital; a small private hospital (BMI Healthcare's Saxon Clinic); a large combined school (Falconhurst); and a retirement village. Eaglestone's residential area is to the north of the medical campus. It has houses surrounding parks with children's playing equipment, outdoor furniture (often used for street parties) and a large area of greenery. Eaglestone has a local shopping centre with various shops.

=== Leadenhall ===
Leadenhall contains the Woughton Campus of Milton Keynes College, Milton Keynes Academy, St Pauls School, Milton Keynes and Woughton Leisure Centre – including The Pitz performance space.

=== Netherfield ===
Netherfield is a housing estate located on the south side of Standing Way (A421, H8) opposite the University Hospital, it also has a small shopping arcade with various shops.

The estate was largely designed by Dixon, Jones, Gold and Cross around 1971, and is essentially modernist; it comprises several long parallel terraces, designed around the landform so that the roofline remains level: homes towards the top of the slopes are single storey; those at the bottom are three-storey. The choice of prefabricated construction materials was partly a consequence of a shortage of bricks in the UK at the time. Milton Keynes Council has gradually been renovating the estate, adding a pitched roof when funds permit.

=== Peartree Bridge ===
Peartree Bridge is mainly composed of a crescent of modern terraced housing overlooking the Grand Union canal and backing onto Marlborough Street (the V8 grid road). The area also includes a canal marina and has a small farm (InterAction) that provides workshops for local children including circus camp, pottery and community friendly underpass painting.

=== Redmoor ===
Redmoor is an industrial district. Notable organisations based there include Post Office Parcels.

=== Tinkers Bridge ===
Tinkers Bridge is an estate of mainly social housing. It is part of a grid square that also includes Passmore and Woughton Park private housing (that are in Old Woughton parish) and the Walton Hall campus of the Open University (in Walton parish). The Grand Union separates it from Woughton Park; the River Ouzel separates both from the University.

== Woughton Campus ==
This area of Woughton, zoned educational, is home to

- Milton Keynes College, a further education college
- Milton Keynes Academy, a secondary school
- St Paul's Catholic School, a secondary school.

== Campaign to divide the original parish ==
In 2010, the residents of Woughton on the Green, Woughton Park and Passmore (in the Tinkers Bridge grid square), came together to argue for the parish to be split into two smaller ones – one consisting primarily of private housing and the other of public housing. In autumn 2010, the campaign was launched after a group of residents surveyed the three estates and found that over 90% of those who responded supported the proposal. In response, the chairman of the community council accused those in favour of elitism, saying, 'to divide those communities in an artificial way that divides rich from poor is surely against the very spirit of what we are all seeking to do in Milton Keynes'. In October 2010, Milton Keynes Borough Councillors, in a recorded vote, voted against the proposal to split the parish into two smaller parishes, however a further review was instigated. In November 2011, Milton Keynes Council changed their decision and instigated the new parish, with the temporary title of Ouzel Valley. Parish elections were held in May 2012 and, at the first meeting of the nine-member parish council, the name of Old Woughton Parish was adopted. The remainder of the original parish retained the original name.
