= Alex Owumi =

Nigerian-American basketball player (born 1984)

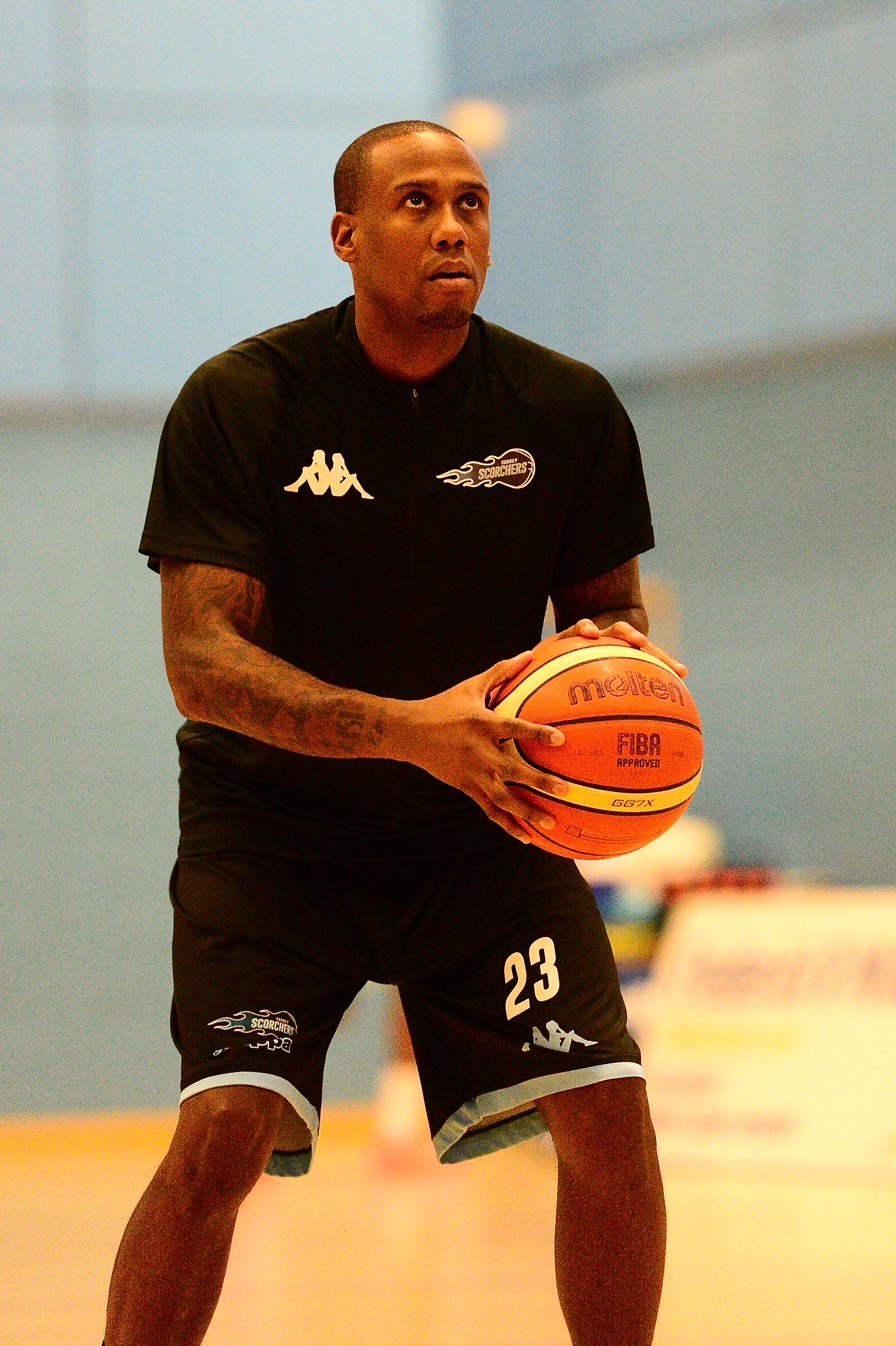
- Owumi warms up for the Scorchers in 2017

Personal information
- Born: May 4, 1984 (age 42) Lagos, Nigeria
- Listed height: 6 ft 4 in (1.93 m)
- Listed weight: 209 lb (95 kg)

Career information
- High school: Jeremiah E. Burke (Boston, Massachusetts)
- College: CC of Rhode Island (2004–2005); Monroe CC (2005–2006); Alcorn State (2006–2008)
- NBA draft: 2008: undrafted
- Playing career: 2008–present
- Position: Guard
- Number: 15

Career history
- 2009–2010: AL Roche-la-Molière
- 2010: Manchester Millrats
- 2010: Lirija
- 2010–2011: Al-Nasr
- 2011: El-Olympi
- 2012–2015: Worcester Wolves
- 2015–2017: London Lions
- 2017–2018: Surrey Scorchers
- 2018–2020: Worthing Thunder

Career highlights
- BBL Play-off Finals champion (2014); BBL Honorable Mention (2013); BBL All-Defensive Honorable Mention (2013); Egyptian League champion (2011); Egyptian League Finals MVP (2011); French NM1 MVP (2010); 2× NJCAA All-American (2005, 2006)

Alexander Owumi (born May 4, 1984) is a Nigerian-American professional basketball player and author. He became the subject of widespread media attention following his time with Al-Nasr, a Libyan team owned by the family of Muammar Gaddafi. Owumi last played for the Worthing Thunder of the National Basketball League Division 1 (NBL 1) in England of which he now owns.

Originally from Lagos, Nigeria, Owumi moved to Boston as a child. He played football and basketball from an early age and at the college level. He focused on basketball at the Community College of Rhode Island and was named a National Junior College Athletic Association (NJCAA) All-American. Owumi played his final two seasons at Alcorn State in Lorman, Mississippi, but he failed to attract any attention from National Basketball Association (NBA) teams. As a result, in 2009, he moved to France and played his rookie season with AL Roche-la-Molière where he was named most valuable player of the league.

After a brief spell in the Premier Basketball League (PBL) with the Manchester Millrats in 2010, he signed with KK Lirija in Macedonia. He left the team at the end of the season after facing unpleasant playing conditions and racist abuse, and accepted a lucrative offer with Al-Nasr, joining the Libyan team shortly before the outbreak of the Libyan Civil War in 2011. When conflict erupted, Owumi was trapped in Mutassim Gaddafi's apartment without food or electricity for several days in the midst of the violence, before he was able to escape to Egypt, where he was arrested and detained. After his release, he played for El-Olympi, an Egyptian team, helping them win a league championship. He then moved to England and began playing in the BBL, joining the Worcester Wolves, with whom he won a league title, before moving to the London Lions and then the Surrey Scorchers.

== Early life ==
Owumi was born on May 4, 1984, in Lagos, Nigeria to Claudia and Joseph Owumi. His father came from a wealthy Nigerian Catholic family, while his mother, Claudia, grew up in Cambridge, Massachusetts. The two met while attending college in the Boston area. Claudia later worked as a teacher at various schools in Lagos and then became a principal. His family lived in a village located just outside Lagos. His father and his brother, also named Joseph, were village chiefs, while Alex was a prince. His rank earned him the title Prince Alexander and entitled him to his own military guard detail. The language spoken in the village was Urhobo; Owumi was not fluent in English in his early years.

By the age of eight, Owumi had begun playing both basketball and football. He played the former sport with a soccer ball and a milk crate nailed to a tree. The sport was becoming increasingly popular in Nigeria because of the success of National Basketball Association (NBA) center Hakeem Olajuwon, and Owumi followed the NBA. When he was 12, his family moved to England, where they lived for three years. They then settled in Boston after his father joined the Harvard T.H. Chan School of Public Health as a financial administrator. In sixth grade, Owumi enrolled at the local Tobin School. He attended Jeremiah E. Burke High School in Dorchester, Boston, where he played basketball and football. Owumi later estimated that he lost, at most, nine high school basketball games. While attending Burke in 2003, he won The Boston Globe Scholar Athlete Award, given to the top male and female student-athletes in Boston. Owumi was also a part of the Amateur Athletic Union (AAU) basketball team, Boston Amateur Athletic Club, while in high school.

== College career ==
On March 18, 2003, Owumi signed a letter of intent to play college football for the Georgetown Hoyas football team under head coach Bob Benson. He joined the team on a scholarship, uncertain of his future in basketball. Although Owumi had initially wanted to play the quarterback's position, his coaches wanted him to play wide receiver because of his athletic abilities. He later moved to play safety, and eventually became the Hoyas' third-string quarterback, but he did not appear in a regular season game at the position. Following football season, Owumi often practiced with the school's basketball team but never joined. He decided to transfer out of Georgetown to focus on academics and basketball, retaining his four years of college basketball eligibility.

Encouraged by their fairly successful basketball program and facilities, Owumi began attending the Community College of Rhode Island (CCRI) in the next year. He joined the team, which competed in the NJCAA, as a co-captain under coach Dave Chevalier with hopes of playing for an NCAA Division I program in the future. Owumi brought CCRI to its first NJCAA Men's Division I Basketball Championship appearance in four years by defeating Lackawanna College on March 13, 2005. However, the team did not bring one of its best defenders to the tournament because he had forgotten his airport ID at home, and they were eventually defeated. Owumi earned second-team NJCAA All-American honors, becoming the sixth player in the school's history to do so.

In his second basketball season, Owumi joined Monroe Community College (Monroe CC) in Rochester, New York because he wanted to play for head coach Jerry Burns and his staff. He had failed to receive any scholarship offers from Division I programs. On December 4, 2005, Owumi scored 26 points with 8 three-point field goals in a win over Rockland Community College. During his time at Monroe CC, he began attracting interest from basketball teams at Rutgers, San Diego State, and UCLA. A two-star recruit, and the fifth-best junior college recruit in New York according to 247Sports.com, he was recruited from Monroe CC by Samuel West and Jason Cable of the Alcorn State Braves.

On February 1, 2006, Owumi signed a letter of intent to play for Alcorn State, a member of the Southwestern Athletic Conference (SWAC) and an NCAA Division I program. He committed to the team on June 10 before enrolling on June 30. In his debut with the Braves on November 9, 2006, Owumi recorded 2 points, 5 rebounds, and 2 steals off the bench in a 103–44 loss to the Texas Longhorns. Owumi struggled to guard Kevin Durant during the game. He first scored in the double digits on November 27, with a team-high 12 points against the Baylor Bears. He led Alcorn State to its first Division I victory of the season on January 13, 2007, when he posted 15 points and 6 rebounds against the Mississippi Valley State Delta Devils. Two games later, the junior scored 17 points in a victory over the Alabama State Hornets. Owumi notched a career-high 30 points, along with a season-best ten rebounds, in a March 1 loss to the Prairie View A&M Panthers. During an 11-win season, he averaged 8.3 points, 4.3 rebounds, 0.8 assists, and 0.8 steals per game.

"Amazingly, I was happy with my short time at Alcorn State. Thrilled, actually. I never would have guessed it going in, with the rats and the run-down, isolated campus, but I became a real proud alum. I just loved, loved, loved that school, everything about it."

— Owumi on Alcorn State University, Qaddafi's Point Guard.

Owumi returned to Alcorn State to play basketball as a senior, and became team captain. In his season debut on November 9, 2007, he had 10 points and 8 rebounds in an 18-point loss to the Southeastern Louisiana Lions. Coming off the bench against the Texas–Rio Grande Valley Vaqueros on December 1, Owumi led the Braves with 20 points. In his next Division I game, he recorded 24 points and eight rebounds. Owumi's 2007–08 season-high of 28 points came in an 81–75 Alcorn State loss to the Texas Southern Tigers on January 5, 2008; he added 9 rebounds and 4 assists. Although Owumi had an increased role on the team in his senior year, the Braves finished the season with a 7–24 win–loss record. He closed out his final college season with per-game averages of 14.4 points, 6.6 rebounds (a team-best figure), 1.9 assists, and 0.9 steals.

== Professional career ==
=== Early years (2009–2010) ===
Following his Alcorn State career, Owumi was uncertain if he would be able to make the NBA after college, because of the relatively low talent level and popularity of the SWAC. Still, he hoped to join the NBA's Boston Celtics, as his former AAU coach Leo Papile had connections with the organization. In June 2008, Owumi participated in a pre-NBA draft camp with the Celtics. He averaged 10.9 points and 3.0 rebounds at the event. Before the 2008 NBA draft, he took part in pre-draft workouts in Boston and Orlando, Florida. However, Owumi was unable to attract enough interest from the Celtics. In late 2008, he joined the Manchester Millrats of the Premier Basketball League (PBL), an American minor league, for the preseason. Based in Manchester, New Hampshire, the team was located very close to his parents' home. In his first preseason game on December 6, 2008, he put up 16 points and 7 rebounds to help the Millrats defeat the Quebec Kebs.

After briefly considering a path into the NBA Development League, the minor league to the NBA, Owumi signed with the French club AL Roche-la-Molière of the Nationale Masculine 1 (NM1) for the 2009–10 season, encouraged to join by a salary increase. A member of the team's starting lineup, he averaged 17.2 points and 6.0 rebounds and won league MVP accolades—although his team finished with a poor record. During the season, he was benched without pay for a number of games for missing practice and instead attending the Cannes Film Festival.

On returning from France, Owumi again played for the Millrats. With Owumi's contribution of 13 points and 5 rebounds, the team defeated the Kebs to clinch the Atlantic Division title. In the league semifinals, the Millrats lost to the Rochester Razorsharks. Owumi played 22 games with Manchester, averaging 14.9 points, 3.0 rebounds, and 1.2 assists. He had a three-point field goal percentage of .429, which ranked second in the league. The departure of head coach Rob Spon prompted Owumi to leave the team. In the fall of 2010, he tried out for the Georgia Gwizzlies of the American Basketball Association (ABA) but never signed with the team.

For the 2010–11 season, Owumi received an offer of about $10,000 per month from KK Lirija of the Macedonian First League. While in Macedonia, he was nicknamed "Alexander the Great". The Macedonian arenas, which often lacked proper heating systems, were about 20 °F (−6.67 °C) in the winter and were sometimes heated using burn barrels. Owumi and his American teammates became the targets of racist slurs from opposing fans. In a road game against KK Rabotnički, some of his Albanian teammates attacked fans burning the Albanian flag, sparking a riot. The violence convinced him to find a new team.

=== Playing for Gaddafi (2010–2011) ===
In late 2010, an agent approached Goran Gramatikov, Owumi's agent, looking for players of African descent to play professional basketball in Libya. By December 27, 2010, Owumi had arrived in the country, signing a lucrative deal with Al-Nasr, a team from Benghazi that played in the top Libyan league. Despite fears of the country's instability in the midst of the budding Arab Spring, and attempts by his girlfriend Alexis Jones to discourage him, he chose to remain with the team, prompted by the poor conditions in Macedonia. He said later, "The most important thing was to get out of the bad situation I was in, and once I had the opportunity to get some place better to play basketball, that's all I really cared about. I didn't really care about the team, I cared about the money and that it was going to be on time and that I was going to be able to further my career and get to feed my family."

Before his first practice with Al-Nasr, Owumi became nauseated from food poisoning and was hospitalized. He moved into a luxurious apartment in the center of Benghazi owned by Mutassim Gaddafi. Initially unaware of the apartment's ownership, he later saw pictures of Libyan leader Muammar Gaddafi and his family across the building and learned that the Gaddafi family owned Al-Nasr. Owumi began playing with Al-Nasr during a three-game losing streak. His Libyan teammates had bruises and scratches from security guards beating them during such slumps. The team received millions of dollars in funding from the Gaddafi family, and its home arena was the site of Gaddafi's first public execution.

With Al-Nasr, Owumi traveled to games on private jets, did not have to pay for food, and had his own driver. Although he only saw Gaddafi at one game, he met his sons Al-Saadi and Mutassim and considered following their footsteps into the oil business. In his first few weeks in Benghazi, he witnessed several protests against Gaddafi, but relatively little violence. He also saw people, including his teammates, gathering ammunition and weapons to prepare for the revolution against Gaddafi's government.

==== Violence breaks out ====
"But it carried on—the screams, the sirens, the gunshots. Non-stop, 24 hours a day. My apartment was in a war zone. It was all around me, I was just a dot in the middle of the circle of the bullseye. I told myself that I would be rescued, that at any moment Navy SEALs would come crashing through my steel door."

— Owumi on his weeks trapped in Gaddafi's apartment, BBC.

On February 17, 2011, Owumi's regular driver did not show up to take him to practice. He called his head coach, Sherif Azmy, who instructed him to look outside his apartment, where a violent protest was taking place. According to Owumi, a military convoy of 30 to 40 soldiers approached the hundreds of protesters and began shooting into the crowd without warning. He recounted, "There was nobody with megaphones telling people to disperse. I just saw them shooting. Not to the air or the ground. Just shooting at people. Bodies were dropping. It was happening a block away from my street." Owumi witnessed the deaths of about 200 people that day. Mercenary troops later searched his apartment for revolutionaries, but did not harm him after he showed them his American passport and Al-Nasr player card. After the soldiers assaulted and raped one of his neighbors, Owumi tried unsuccessfully to seize a gun from them.

Owumi was unable to get access to the Internet or use his phone for international calls to contact his parents in the United States. He was also without electricity, and had little food or water. Al-Nasr team president Ahmed Elturki told Owumi that the airport in Libya had been burned down by protesters and advised him to remain in his apartment. Trapped in Mutassim's apartment during conflict, Owumi was eventually forced to drink toilet water with tea bags, urinate in the bathtub, and defecate into plastic bags. He also ate cockroaches and worms he found in flower pots. His poor living conditions caused his teeth to rot and his skin to discolor.

==== Escape to Egypt ====
Approximately two weeks after violence broke out in Benghazi, Owumi received a call from his teammate Moustapha Niang, who said that Elturki would attempt to help the two of them escape the country. Elturki had arranged for a car to take them to an Egyptian refugee camp in Sallum, following Al-Nasr coach Sherif Azmy. Owumi passed through several rebel checkpoints and arrived at the Egyptian border in 12 hours. Because of their appearance, both Owumi and Niang were suspected of being foreign mercenaries fighting for Gaddafi and were subject to harsher treatment. Without proper immigration papers, Owumi was held in Sallum for three days. He was arrested and held in solitary confinement for two hours, and once released, he had to sleep outside for three days in the camp. Owumi and Niang finally escaped the camp during the night. They bribed the driver of a bus, which only carried Egyptian citizens, to help them leave. Owumi received a call from Azmy who wanted to meet him at his home in Alexandria. Owumi then convinced the driver, who was headed to Cairo, to lead them to another bus going to Alexandria.

In Alexandria, Owumi received a satisfactory offer from El-Olympi, a local team coached by one of Azmy's former players and recommended by Azmy himself. Going against his family's wishes, Owumi chose to follow his coach's advice, because he did not want his relatives to see his poor physical and mental state; he felt that he could recover by playing basketball. He recalled, "The real reason why I didn't come home was I was just too raw. You know, I would look in the mirror, and I couldn't recognize myself." He also believed that a return to basketball would help him slowly reduce the trauma he suffered in Libya. However, during this stint, his father fell into a diabetic coma, causing Owumi added stress. He finished the final two weeks of the season with El-Olympi. He led his new team to 13 straight wins and the league championship, and was named most valuable player of the postseason.

==== Aftermath ====
After returning to the United States, Owumi was diagnosed with posttraumatic stress disorder, and continued to suffer from its effects in the years following. He has sometimes had anxiety attacks before games, struggled to sleep, and considered suicide. Owumi was offered a contract to play another season with El-Olympi. Worth twice the money as his first El-Olympi contract, it would have been the biggest of his career, and made him the highest-paid player to play in the Middle East. After initially accepting the deal, he later decided against it because he wanted to take a break from his basketball career. Instead, he began working at a community center in his hometown of Atlanta for seven months, making $9.25 per hour.

=== Worcester Wolves (2012–15) ===
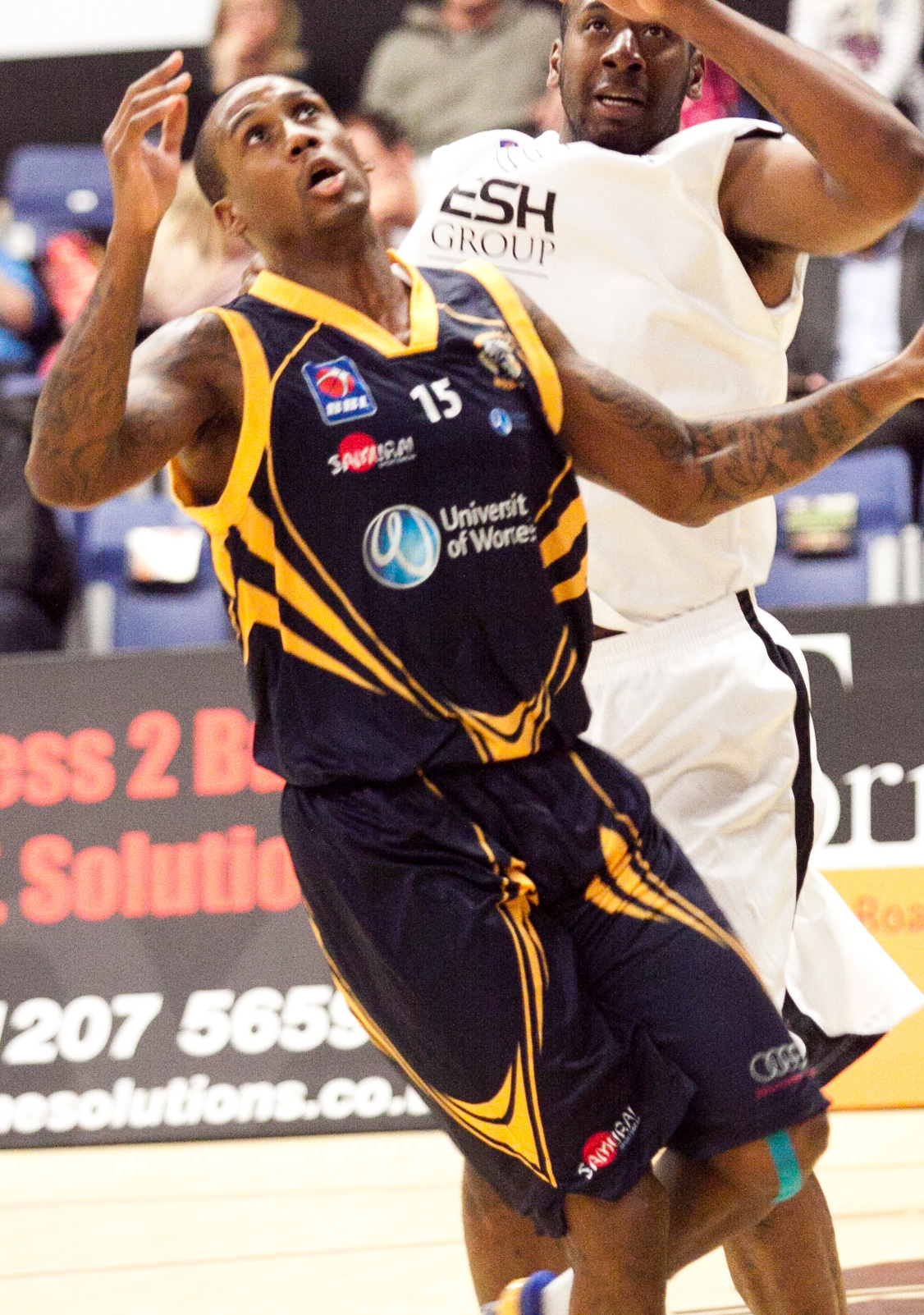
Owumi attempts to grab a rebound with the Wolves in 2012.

During Owumi's hiatus from basketball, his family encouraged him to return to the game, as it was his primary passion. Stanley Ocitti and Sherrad Prezzie-Blue, players who already knew Owumi, suggested that Paul James, head coach of the Worcester Wolves of the British Basketball League (BBL), look into signing him. In the summer of 2012, the Wolves signed Owumi, who joined Prezzie-Blue in the back court. James said, "[Owumi] distributes the ball well and will give us multiple options both on offense and defense." The coach also described Owumi as a "tough-nosed player". He had an immediate impact, recording a team-high 24 points, 5 rebounds, and 3 assists in his debut against the Durham Wildcats on September 22, 2012. He had another strong showing on January 25, 2013, when he put up 30 points in a loss to the Surrey Scorchers. On February 8, he led Worcester to an upset win over the Newcastle Eagles in a BBL Trophy quarterfinal with a season-high 34 points and 9 rebounds. Owumi posted a double-double of 30 points, 16 of which were free throws, and ten rebounds in a loss to the Manchester Giants on March 23. Through the BBL Championship and Play-offs, Owumi averaged 19.4 points, 6.6 rebounds, 3.9 assists, and 1.2 steals. He was named to the BBL Team of the Week First Team on six occasions during the season. He also garnered all-league honorable mention and all-defensive honorable mention honors.

On June 5, 2013, the Wolves announced that Owumi would be returning for another season with the team. James hoped to build the team around him in their upcoming season. Beginning early in the season, Owumi joined forces with Zaire Taylor in the back court. On September 28, 2013, to begin his second BBL season, Owumi scored 18 points and added 2 rebounds and 2 assists in a 117–60 win over the Surrey Scorchers. On December 1, Owumi scored a season-high 30 points to guide the Wolves past the Durham Wildcats. In a rematch with Durham on January 10, 2014, Owumi notched 27 points to extend his team's winning streak to seven. On March 31, he put up 11 points as the Wolves defeated the Glasgow Rocks to win the BBL Trophy. In May, Worcester also claimed the BBL Championship title behind Owumi's 14 points and 6 rebounds. By the end of the season, he was averaging 17.7 points, 5.7 rebounds, 3.4 assists, and 1.3 steals in BBL Championship play.

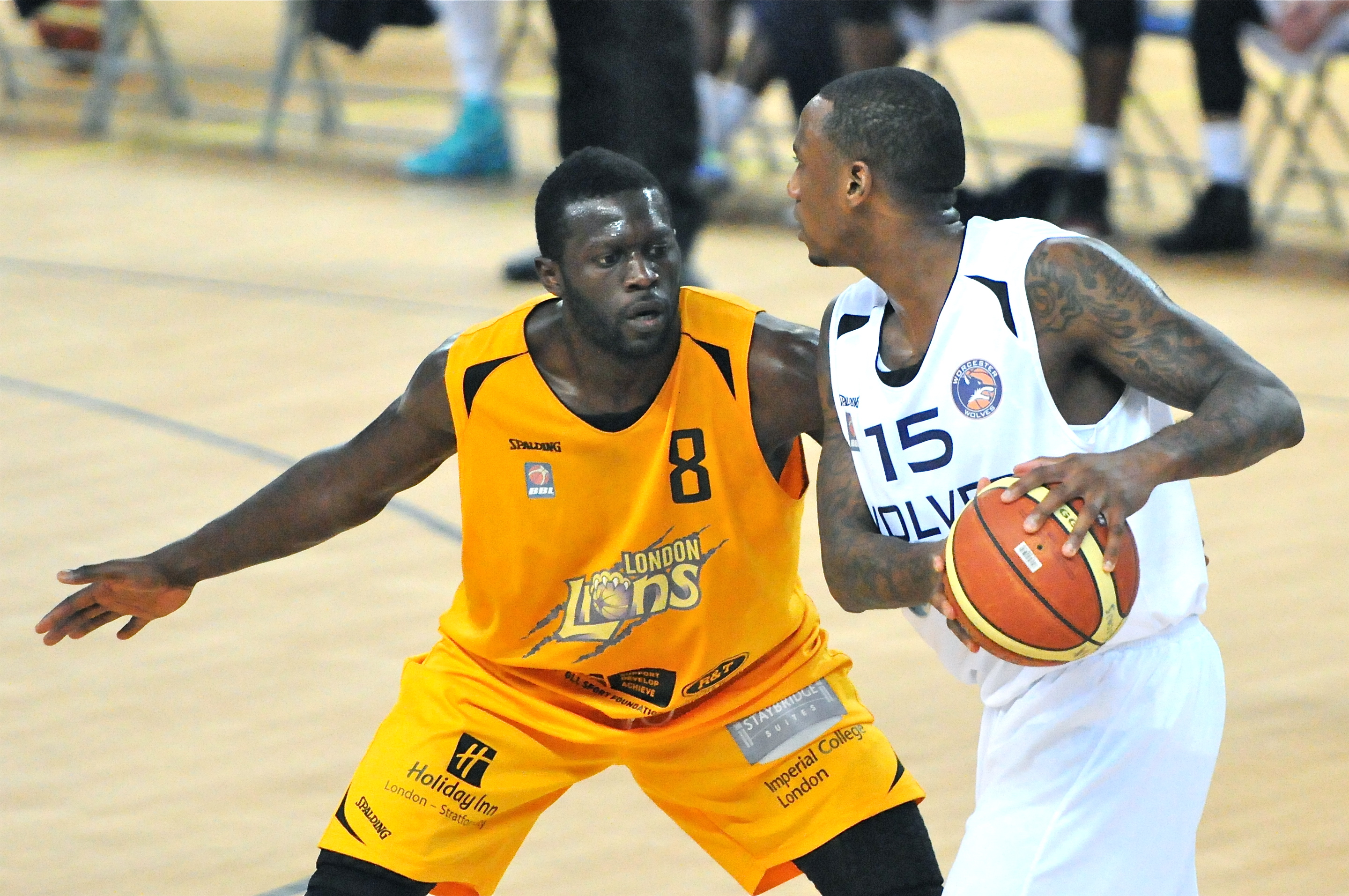
Owumi (right) is guarded by Joe Ikhinmwin of the London Lions in February 2014.

In July 2014, Owumi re-signed with the Wolves for a third season. He commented, "It was an easy decision for me to come back to Worcester, the club and city support everything I'm doing on and off the court. Next season should be exciting, I'm looking forward to building on it." During the off-season, the Wolves had seen the departures of key players Taylor and Will Creekmore. To open the season on September 26, 2014, Owumi recorded 10 points, 6 rebounds, 7 assists, and 3 steals in a win over the Newcastle Eagles. On October 24, he scored a season-high 33 points, making all 6 of his three-point attempts, to beat the Leeds Force, 98–69. Owumi became his team's all-time leader in three-pointers, passing Daniel Gilbert for a total of 169. He collected 5 three-pointers in another 30-point game on December 14, as Worcester fell to the Cheshire Phoenix. On April 26, 2015, in the BBL Play-off quarterfinals, Owumi posted a double-double of 18 points and ten rebounds, but the London Lions eliminated his team with a 106–67 win. He capped the season averaging 16.4 points, 6 rebounds, 3.1 assists, and 1.1 steals per game.

=== London Lions (2015–2017) ===
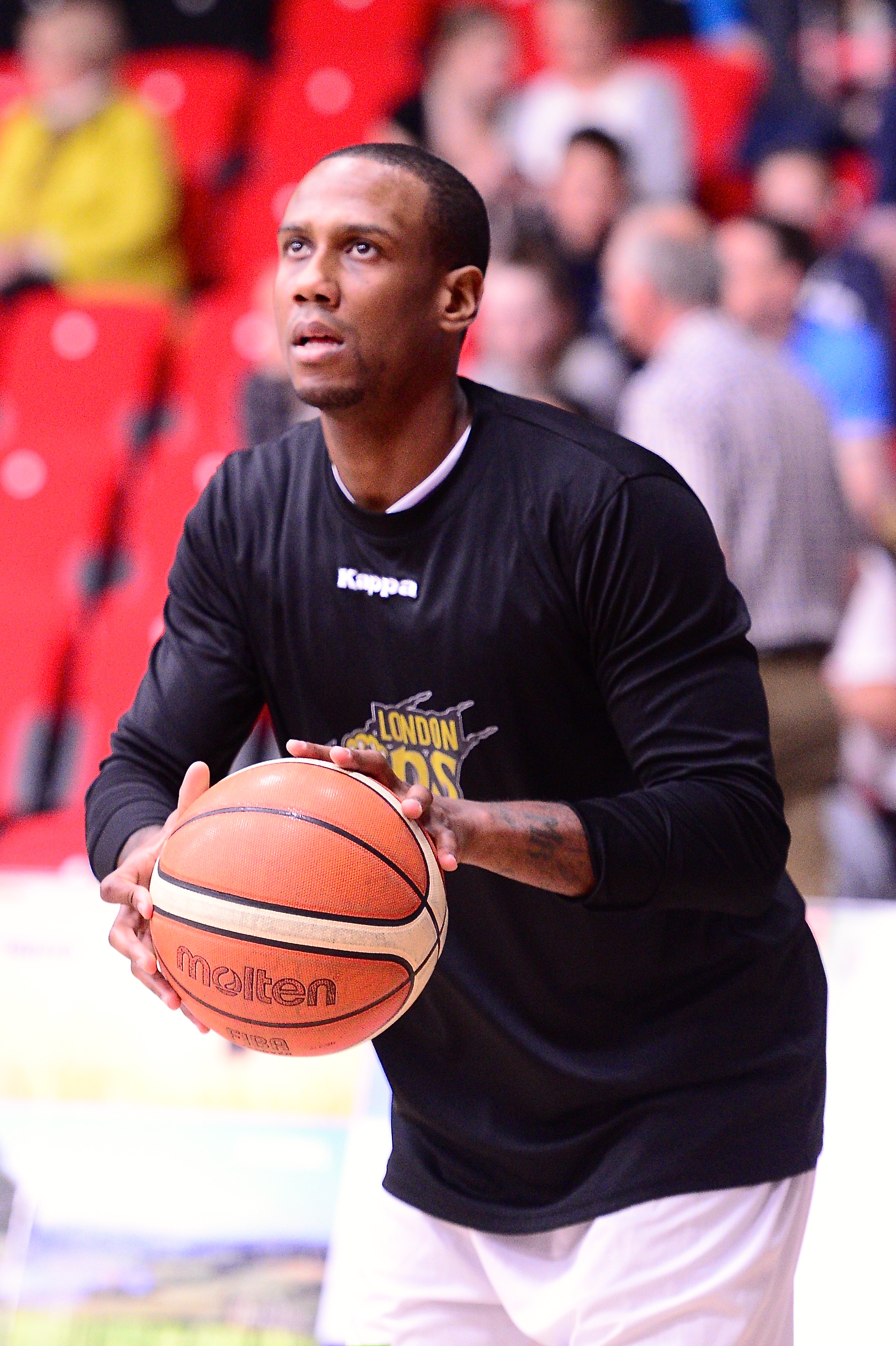
Owumi shoots around before a game with the London Lions in May 2017.

In late June 2015, the Worcester Wolves released Owumi as part of a major roster shake-up that left only one player on the team. On December 18, 2015, Owumi returned to the BBL, signing with the London Lions for the rest of the 2015–16 season. He said, "I always felt I would be back and I'm happy it's in the Capital. Yes, I've been through a lot but I'm old fashioned and I just want to work hard." Owumi debuted on the same day with 11 points in a loss against the Sheffield Sharks. He recorded 22 points and a season-best 9 rebounds as the Lions fell to the Surrey Scorchers on February 12. On March 30, he posted another season-high of 27 points, 19 of which came in the first quarter, in a victory over the Cheshire Phoenix. At the end of the 24-game season, he was averaging 13.4 points, 3.9 rebounds, 2.3 assists, and 0.8 steals per game.

On August 14, 2016, the Lions announced that Owumi would return for the 2016–17 season. In his first game of the season on September 24, he scored 18 points and had 9 rebounds helping beat the Surrey Scorchers. In a BBL Cup win over the Plymouth Raiders on October 9, he made 9 three-pointers in a season-high 32-point effort. Owumi scored 23 points off 8-of-13 shooting, with 19 in the first half, on October 26 against the Leeds Force to help the Lions achieve a 6–0 start to the season. In a rematch with the Scorchers on November 2, Owumi notched 27 points, converting on all 11 free throw attempts. London coasted to a 30-point win. On New Year's Day 2017, he recorded ten points and had 11 assists to overcome a poor shooting night against Surrey. Owumi had a triple-double of 15 points, ten rebounds, and ten assists as the Lions beat the Raiders on March 10. He entered the BBL Play-off with hopes of making a run. However, the Riders ousted London in the semifinals, despite a 21-point night by Owumi. He finished the season with per-game averages of 13.8 points, 5.1 rebounds, 3.5 assists, and 1.0 steals.

=== Surrey Scorchers (2017–2018) ===
On August 4, 2017, Owumi signed with the Surrey Scorchers, his third career BBL team. After the team announced his signing, he said, "Since being in the league, Surrey has had a great fan base and I can't wait to win some silverware for the organization." Owumi also revealed that he prefers playing in smaller cities like Guildford, Surrey, in contrast to London, where he played before. He wanted to join the Scorchers because head coach Creon Raftopoulos would give him more freedom to bring in players he knew to the team. Owumi made his debut for the Scorchers on September 29, 2017, scoring 16 points in an 81–78 win over the Sheffield Sharks. On November 12, he recorded 20 points, with a season-high 6 three-pointers, to help the Scorchers defeat the Manchester Giants. Owumi scored a season-high 21 points on March 23, 2018, against the London Lions. One week later, he matched that mark, notching 21 points, 6 rebounds, and 3 assists in a 96–94 win over the Manchester Giants. Through 33 games in the season, Owumi averaged 10.8 points, 5.1 rebounds, and 2.4 assists per game.

=== Worthing Thunder (2018–present) ===
On August 6, 2018, Owumi signed with the Worthing Thunder of the National Basketball League Division 1, the second-tier British league. He made his season debut against the Barking Abbey Crusaders, scoring 24 points.

== Personal life ==
After Owumi returned to the United States from Libya, his mother suggested that he write a book about his experiences living in Benghazi during the Arab Spring. Although initially wanting to forget those memories, he wrote his autobiography Qaddafi's Point Guard: The Incredible Story of a Professional Basketball Player Trapped in Libya's Civil War with Daniel Paisner, a New York Times bestselling author who had written for Whoopi Goldberg and Denzel Washington. It was published in 2013. It describes Owumi's life from his childhood to his season in Egypt. Publishers Weekly called it a "resonant, moving memoir of an African athlete who survives incredible cultural and political challenges to play the sport he loves". Kirkus Reviews remarked that it was "well-written but with the feel of a magazine article masquerading as a book". In September 2016, Owumi wrote the fictional thriller The Fire Raven: Volume 1 about a female assassin trying to discover her past. In April 2017, he released the sequel The Fire Raven: Welcome To Winter: Volume 2.

== Bibliography ==
- Owumi, Alex; Paisner, Daniel (2013). Qaddafi's Point Guard: The Incredible Story of a Professional Basketball Player Trapped in Libya's Civil War. Rodale Press, Incorporated. ISBN 978-1609615161.
