= Amin Adamu =

British basketball player (born 1997)

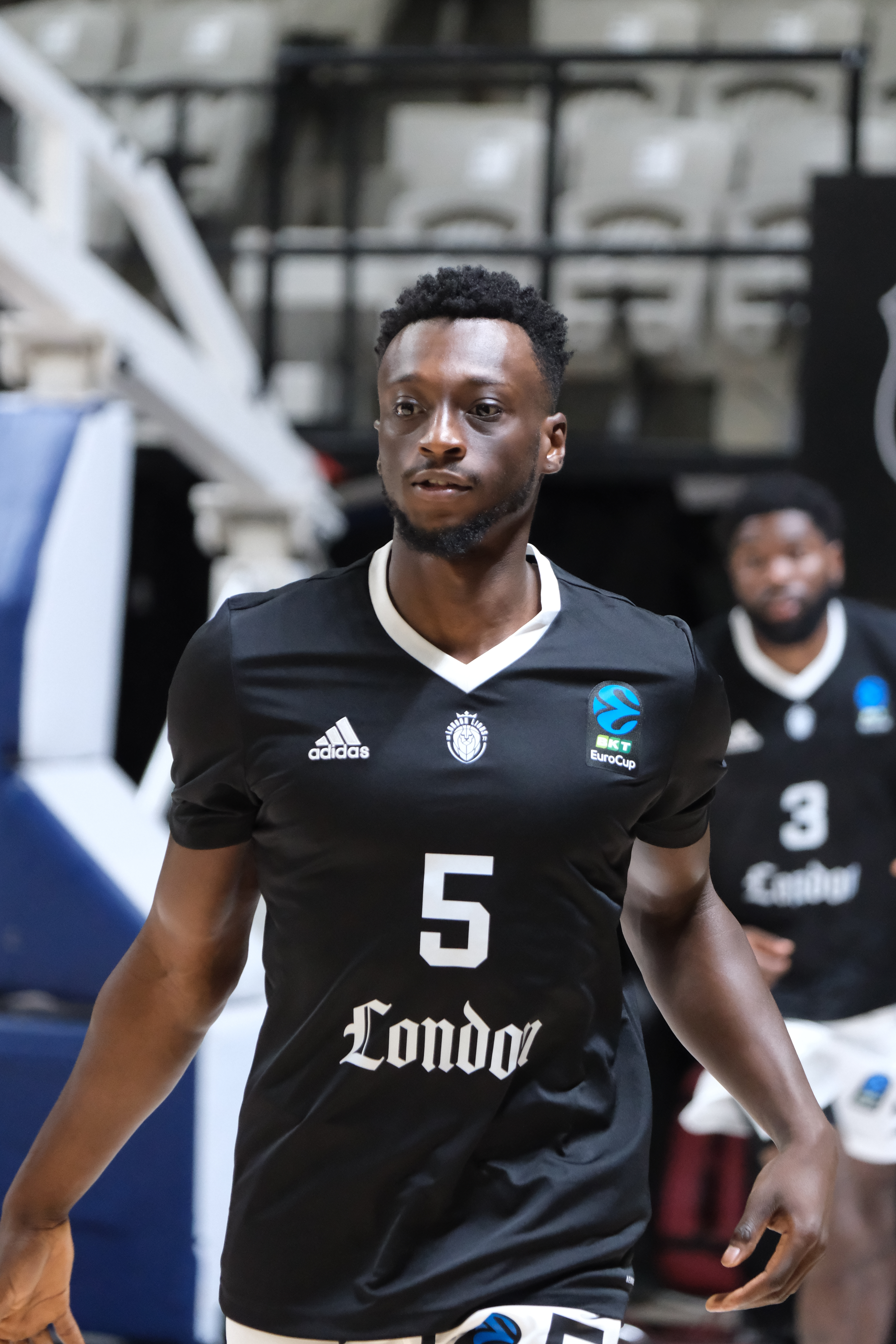
- Adamu with the London Lions in 2025

No. 5 – Kortrijk Spurs
- Position: Point guard
- League: BNXT League

Personal information
- Born: 3 October 1997 (age 29) London, United Kingdom
- Listed height: 1.94 m (6 ft 4 in)
- Listed weight: 86 kg (190 lb)

Career information
- High school: Barking Abbey (London, England)
- College: Western Wyoming CC (2017–2018); Casper College (2018–2019); Montana State (2019–2022)
- NBA draft: 2022: undrafted
- Playing career: 2022–present

Career history
- 2022–2023: Kapfenberg Bulls
- 2023–2024: Olomoucko
- 2024–2025: Salon Vilpas
- 2025–2026: London Lions
- 2026–present: Kortrijk Spurs

Amin Adamu (born 3 October 1997) is a British professional basketball player for Kortrijk Spurs in the BNXT League. Adamu plays also for the Great Britain men's national basketball team.

== Professional career ==
Adamu has played college basketball with Casper College and Western Wyoming Community College in NJCAA, and Montana State Bobcats in NCAA.

He started his professional career with Austrian team Kapfenberg Bulls in 2022. Next season he joined BK Olomoucko in the Czech National Basketball League.

In August 2024, Adamu joined Salon Vilpas in Finnish Korisliiga. They went on to finish 3rd in the league and won the bronze medal. Adamu averaged 13.8 points, 4.2 rebounds and 2.5 assists.

In July 2025, he signed with London Lions in the Super League Basketball and the EuroCup.

On August 6, 2026, he signed with Kortrijk Spurs in the BNXT League.

== National team career ==
Adamu played for the Great Britain U20 national team at the 2017 FIBA U20 European Championship Division B in Romania, where they finished 3rd and were promoted to Division A.

He has played for the Great Britain men's national team in the 2023 FIBA World Cup qualifiers and in the EuroBasket 2025 qualification games, helping his country to qualify for the EuroBasket 2025 final tournament.

== Personal life ==
He is in a relationship with Hungarian swimmer Petra Halmai, who competed at the 2020 Summer Olympics in Tokyo. The couple has lived together in Salo, Finland.

== Career statistics ==
Legend
GP	Games played	GS	Games started	MPG	Minutes per game
FG%	Field goal percentage	3P%	3-point field goal percentage	FT%	Free throw percentage
RPG	Rebounds per game	APG	Assists per game	SPG	Steals per game
BPG	Blocks per game	PPG	Points per game	**Bold**	Career high

=== EuroCup ===
Year	Team	GP	GS	MPG	FG%	3P%	FT%	RPG	APG	SPG	BPG	PPG	PIR
2025–26	London Lions	18	11	12.0	.403	.385	.333	1.4	.8	.3	.0	3.9	1.3

=== National team ===
Team	Tournament	Pos.	GP	PPG	RPG	APG
Great Britain	EuroBasket 2025	21st	4	4.5	0.8	0.3

=== College ===
Year	Team	GP	GS	MPG	FG%	3P%	FT%	RPG	APG	SPG	BPG	PPG
2019–20	Montana State	29	28	27.2	.455	.200	.740	**5.2**	1.4	1.0	**.2**	11.7
2020–21	Montana State	22	22	**30.7**	.484	.371	.802	5.0	1.5	**1.6**	**.2**	**14.7**
2021–22	Montana State	**33**	**33**	27.3	**.503**	**.391**	**.814**	4.7	**1.7**	.6	**.2**	11.4
Career		84	83	28.2	.480	.341	.784	5.0	1.6	1.0	.2	12.4
