= Mike New =

American basketball player and coach

Personal information
- Born: February 12, 1968 (age 58) Chicago, Illinois, U.S.
- Listed height: 6 ft 9 in (2.06 m)
- Listed weight: 233 lb (106 kg)

Career information
- College: New Mexico State (1989–1991)
- Playing career: 1996–present
- Position: Forward / center

Career highlights
- BBL Cup winner (2008)

Mike New (born February 12, 1968) is an American former basketball forward-center for the Milton Keynes Lions of the British Basketball League. Since 2007 New has also held the position of Head Coach of the Milton Keynes College Basketball Academy. He is now the head coach of the Milton Keynes Lions
