= Maxwell Lewis =

American basketball player (born 2002)

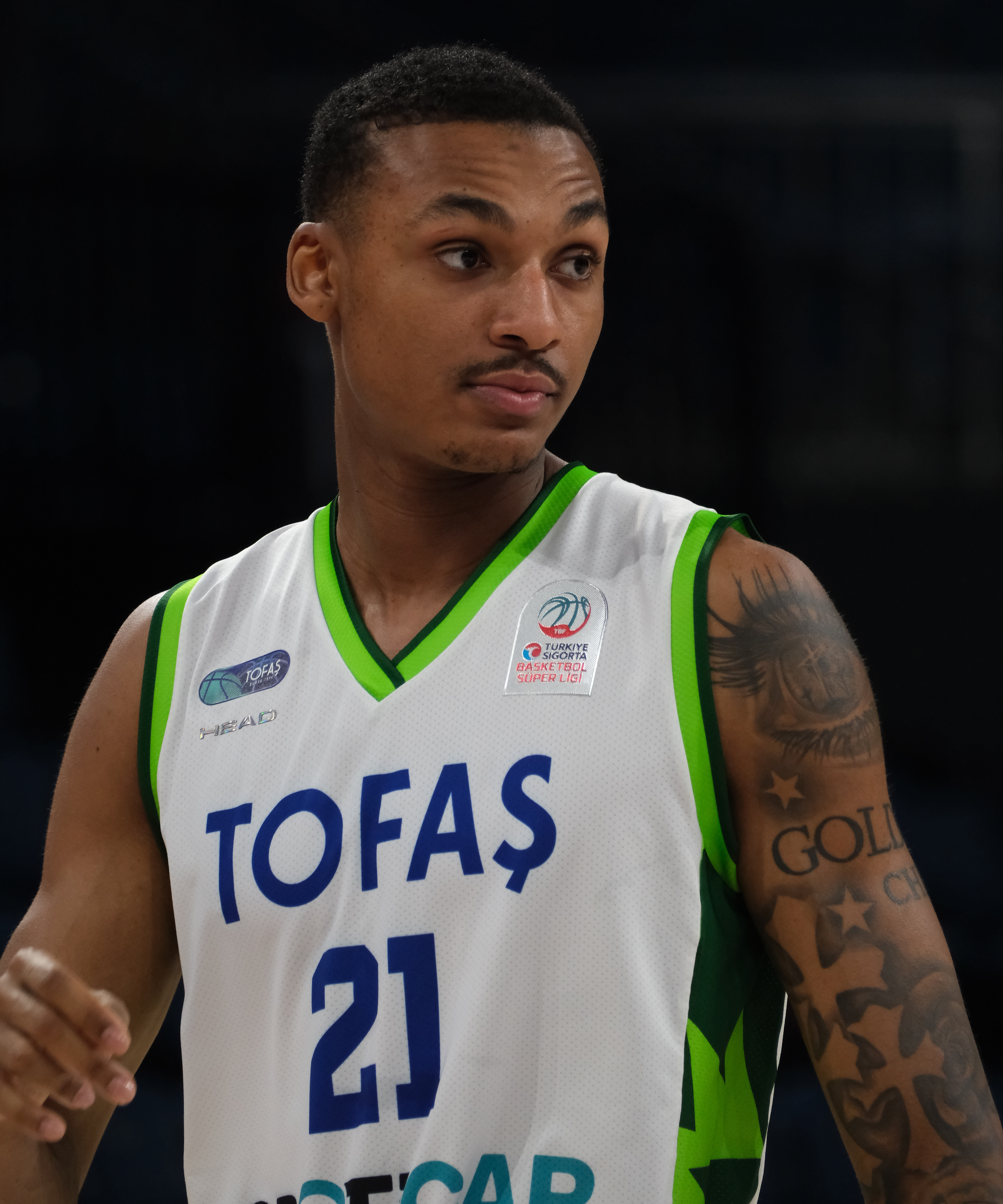
- Lewis with Tofaş in 2025

No. 2 – London Lions
- Position: Small forward
- League: SLB; EuroCup

Personal information
- Born: July 27, 2002 (age 24) Las Vegas, Nevada, U.S.
- Listed height: 6 ft 7 in (2.01 m)
- Listed weight: 215 lb (98 kg)

Career information
- High school: Somerset-Losee (Las Vegas, Nevada); AZ Compass Prep (Chandler, Arizona)
- College: Pepperdine (2021–2023)
- NBA draft: 2023: 2nd round, 40th overall pick
- Drafted by: Denver Nuggets
- Playing career: 2023–present

Career history
- 2023–2024: Los Angeles Lakers
- 2023–2024: →South Bay Lakers
- 2024–2025: Brooklyn Nets
- 2025–2026: Tofaş
- 2026: Juventus Utena
- 2026–present: Žalgiris Kaunas
- 2026–present: →London Lions

Career highlights
- NBA Cup champion (2023); Second-team All-WCC (2023); WCC All-Freshman team (2022)
- Stats at NBA.com
- Stats at Basketball Reference

Maxwell Lewis III (born July 27, 2002) is an American professional basketball player for the London Lions of the Super League Basketball (SBL) and the EuroCup, on loan from Žalgiris Kaunas. He played college basketball for the Pepperdine Waves.

Lewis was selected in the second round with the 40th overall pick by the Denver Nuggets in the 2023 NBA draft, but was traded to the Los Angeles Lakers on draft night. As a rookie, Lewis and the Lakers won the first ever NBA Cup championship in 2023. During his time with Los Angeles, he has been assigned to their NBA G League affiliate the South Bay Lakers several times before being traded to the Brooklyn Nets in 2024.

== Early life ==
Lewis' father, Robert, is from Los Angeles, California, and moved for work to Las Vegas, Nevada, where Lewis was born and raised. Robert served as a coach in recreational youth leagues in the Las Vegas Valley. Lewis played basketball in his childhood but stopped playing organized basketball as an elementary school student at the request of his father who believed that a coach was treating him poorly. Lewis instead studied the saxophone to replace his idle time but continued to play pickup basketball and trained with his older brother. He had a growth spurt four years later that enabled his father to let him play basketball again and made a return in a National Junior Basketball League. Lewis led the league in scoring and attracted attention from coaches but enrolled at Somerset-Losse specifically to play in its jazz and concert bands.

== High school career ==
Somerset-Losee did not have a basketball team during Lewis' freshman year so he played junior varsity at Mojave High School. Somerset-Losee introduced a boys basketball team during Lewis' sophomore year in 2017–18 where he averaged 28 points and 13 rebounds per game. Lewis desired greater competition than the outstate schools and other charters that Somerset-Losee played so he transferred to Ed W. Clark High School and reclassified to the graduating class of 2021. He was relegated to junior varsity amid the transfer rules of the Nevada Interscholastic Activities Association and decided to transfer again to AZ Compass Prep.

Lewis thrived against national competition during his junior season in 2019–20 and earned scholarship offers from high major college programs. On July 21, 2020, he announced that he would bypass college and his senior high school season in favor of Chameleon BX, a preparatory program in San Francisco, which was designed to prepare players for the NBA draft. Lewis trained for several months with emphasis on strength, cardio and calisthenics but departed before the program concluded. He returned to Las Vegas and preserved one year of club basketball where he played in 2021 as an unsigned senior. Lewis no longer had offers from the high major colleges that had recruited him but received a scholarship offer to play for the Pepperdine Waves under head coach Lorenzo Romar.

== College career ==
Lewis missed the first three games of his career with the Waves due to the National Collegiate Athletic Association (NCAA) reviewing his eligibility after attending Chameleon BX. He played as a reserve during his freshman season with the Waves and averaged 11 points per game. On February 12, 2022, he suffered a season-ending wrist injury. Lewis was selected to the West Coast Conference (WCC) All-Freshman team.

Lewis was moved to the starting lineup during his sophomore season, and averaged 16.6 points per game. He was selected to the All-WCC Second Team. Lewis gained the attention of National Basketball Association (NBA) executives throughout the season who were enticed by his physical dimensions and shot creating abilities. On March 20, 2023, Lewis declared for the 2023 NBA draft. He was invited to participate at the NBA Draft Combine.

== Professional career ==
=== Los Angeles / South Bay Lakers (2023–2024) ===
Lewis was selected with the 40th pick in the 2023 NBA draft by the Denver Nuggets. His draft rights were traded to the Los Angeles Lakers later in the draft. On July 8, 2023, Lewis signed with the Lakers. On December 9, 2023, Lewis and the Lakers won the inaugural season of the NBA In-Season Tournament.

Throughout his rookie and sophomore seasons, Lewis has been assigned several times to the South Bay Lakers.

=== Brooklyn Nets (2024–2025) ===
On December 29, 2024, Lewis, D'Angelo Russell, and three future second-round picks were traded to the Brooklyn Nets in exchange for Dorian Finney-Smith and Shake Milton. On January 1, 2025, in his first game with Brooklyn, Lewis suffered a fractured left tibia and was subsequently ruled out for at least four weeks. On April 3, Lewis made his first start of his career in which he recorded 10 points, 6 rebounds, and 2 assists in a 105–90 loss against the Minnesota Timberwolves. On June 27, Lewis was waived by the Nets.

On July 5, 2025, Lewis signed with the Dallas Mavericks for the 2025 NBA Summer League.

=== Tofaş (2025–2026) ===
On July 24, 2025, Lewis signed with Tofaş of the Turkish Basketbol Süper Ligi (BSL) and the Basketball Champions League (BCL). In 12 BCL games, he averaged 5.5 points, 3.1 rebounds, and 0.8 assists per game. Lewis parted ways with the club in March 2026.

=== Juventus Utena (2026) ===
On March 12, 2026, Lewis signed with Juventus Utena of the Lithuanian Basketball League (LKL) for the rest of the season. Lewis played a pivotal role during Juventus' historic postseason run, helping the team reach their first LKL Finals and qualify for the Basketball Champions League. In 22 appearances, Lewis averaged 13.6 points, 5.0 rebounds and 2.0 assists per game.

=== Žalgiris Kaunas (2026–present) ===
On June 17, 2026, Lewis signed with Žalgiris Kaunas of the Lithuanian Basketball League (LKL) and the EuroLeague, but was loaned to the London Lions of the Super League Basketball (SBL) and the EuroCup.

== Career statistics ==
Legend
GP	Games played	GS	Games started	MPG	Minutes per game
FG%	Field goal percentage	3P%	3-point field goal percentage	FT%	Free throw percentage
RPG	Rebounds per game	APG	Assists per game	SPG	Steals per game
BPG	Blocks per game	PPG	Points per game	**Bold**	Career high

=== NBA ===
Year	Team	GP	GS	MPG	FG%	3P%	FT%	RPG	APG	SPG	BPG	PPG
2023–24	L.A. Lakers	**34**	0	3.0	.190	.111	.667	.1	.2	.1	.0	.3
2024–25	L.A. Lakers	7	0	4.1	.333	—	—	.3	.3	.1	.0	.6
2024–25	Brooklyn	21	**1**	**14.2**	**.422**	**.380**	**.700**	**2.5**	**.8**	**.4**	**.3**	**5.3**
Career		62	1	7.0	.380	.339	.692	1.0	.4	.2	.1	2.0
