= Navid Niktash =

Iranian-French basketball player

No. 8 – Petrochimi Bandar Imam BC
- Position: Power forward / small forward
- League: IBSL

Personal information
- Born: January 17, 1991 (age 35) France
- Listed height: 6 ft 8 in (2.03 m)
- Listed weight: 190 lb (86 kg)

Career information
- NBA draft: 2014: undrafted
- Playing career: 2014–present

Career history
- 2014-2016: Angers Etoile d'Or St-Leonard
- 2016: Norrköping Dolphins
- 2016–2017: London Lions
- 2017–Present: Petrochimi Bandar Imam BC

Navid Niktash (born January 17, 1991) is an Iranian-French professional basketball player for the London Lions of the British Basketball League (BBL). Niktash's plays small forward and power forward.

== Career ==
=== Angers Etoile d'Or St-Leonard (2014-2016) ===
In 2014, Niktash began his professional career in France with Étoile d'Or Saint Léonard Angers in the LNB Pro B. He remained with them for two years and helped them become champion of Group B of LNB Pro B in 2015.

=== Norrköping Dolphins (2016) ===
Niktash played two games for the Norrköping Dolphins in 2016 before signing with the London Lions. He scored 1.5 points on average and two rebounds in those two games.

=== London Lions (2016–2017) ===
Niktash signed with the London Lions in the British Basketball League – the top level men's basketball league in the United Kingdom. He played 29 games (27 as a starter) and averaged 14.59 points, 6.21 rebounds, 1.37 assists and 45% FG. For three weeks he was named to the All-Star 5 (27th, 28th and 30th).

=== Petrochimi Bandar Imam (since 2017) ===
On August 20, 2017, Niktash signed with the Petrochimi Bandar Imam BC. Petrochimi with him reached the fourth place in FIBA Asia Champions Cup.

== Iranian national team ==
Niktash was invited to play for the Iran national basketball team in China in 2017.

On August 9, 2017, he played his first official match for Iran against India. He recorded 3 points and 6 rebounds and .25 FG% in 12 minutes. He debuted with the Iran national basketball team at the FIBA Asia Cup with averaging 1.5 points, 2.0 rebounds 0.3 steals and 22% ppg.

== Personal life ==
Navid Niktash was born to an Iranian father and a French mother.
