= Milton Keynes University Hospital =

- Milton Keynes University Hospital NHS Foundation Trust
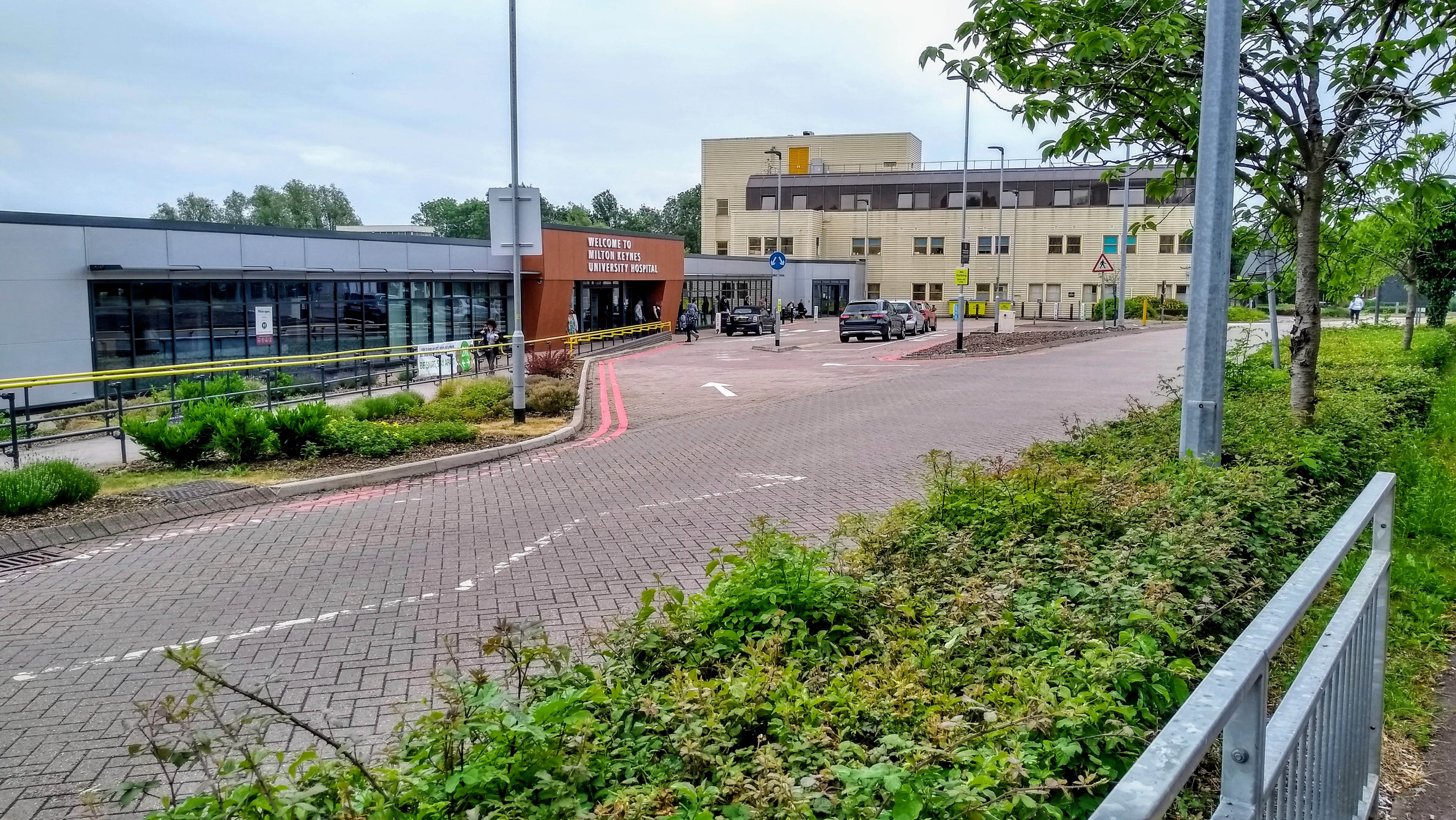
- Main entrance

Geography
- Location: Milton Keynes, Buckinghamshire, England
- Coordinates: 52.02643°N 0.73630°W

Organisation
- Care system: NHS
- Type: District General

Services
- Emergency department: yes
- Beds: 559

Helipads
- Helipad: 52.0255°N 0.7345°W

Links
- Website: www.mkuh.nhs.uk
- Lists: Hospitals in England

Milton Keynes University Hospital is a district general hospital serving the City of Milton Keynes and the surrounding area of Buckinghamshire, Northamptonshire, Bedfordshire and Oxfordshire. It is located in the Eaglestone neighbourhood, and opened in 1984. It is managed by Milton Keynes University Hospital NHS Foundation Trust. The hospital has an association with the University of Buckingham Medical School.

== History ==
Although Milton Keynes built up rapidly in the 1960s and 1970s, its growing population had to rely on the hospitals in Aylesbury, Bedford, Dunstable and Northampton. A campaign "Milton Keynes is Dying for a Hospital" was mounted in the 1970s, leading to the construction of a four-ward community hospital that opened in 1979. At the formal opening of the shopping building in September 1979, Lord Campbell successfully lobbied the Prime Minister for a hospital appropriate to the planned population of the city and work began on the construction of the main hospital in 1980. The new hospital opened in 1984, with a second phase being erected 1988–1992. Both phases of the hospital were opened by the Duchess of Kent. Further expansions, including a 60-bed treatment centre, followed in the early 21st century. In 2007 the hospital announced it had been awarded NHS Foundation Trust status.

=== University teaching hospital ===
In March 2015, the Hospital Trust agreed to provide clinical teaching facilities to the University of Buckingham, and renamed itself a "university hospital trust" accordingly. The university's school of medicine offers MBChB degrees and MD postgraduate degrees. In its first year of inviting applications, the university received 500 applications for its £35,000 a year undergraduate medicine course. Construction of a new building to provide teaching and study space for medical students began in 2017. The building was officially opened in February 2018.

=== Redevelopment and expansion ===
In October 2022, the new "Maple Centre" opened beside A&E (replacing the former "Maple Unit", a nominally temporary building). Its purpose is to ease the pressure on A&E by treating less serious cases.

Construction work on a new radiotherapy centre began in December 2022.

== Services ==
Mental health services and community health services on the hospital site (at the Campbell Centre and Eaglestone Health Centre) are managed by Milton Keynes Community Health Services, which was acquired by Central and North West London NHS Foundation Trust in April 2012.

== Performance ==
In December 2013 it was announced that Monitor was reviewing health services in Bedfordshire and Milton Keynes in an attempt to avert "significant problems ahead" in the local hospitals.

The trust did poorly in the 2014 cancer patient experience survey and in February 2015 agreed to pair up with Harrogate and District NHS Foundation Trust, which did very well, in a scheme intended to "spread and accelerate innovative practice via peer to peer support and learning". Following its inspection, the Care Quality Commission (CQC) advised, in March 2015, that the trust "requires improvement". Following that the CQC carried out an unannounced inspection to the trust on 12, 13 and 17 July 2016, to check how improvements had been made in the urgent and emergency care, medical care and end of life care core services. They also inspected the maternity and gynaecology service. Overall, CQC inspected all five key questions for the urgent and emergency care and medical care core services and found that improvements had been made so that both core services were now rated as "good" overall. The trust was rated "worse than expected" over care for women giving birth. The trust was again graded as "good" overall in 2019.

=== Staffing ===
It was named by the Health Service Journal as one of the top hundred NHS trusts to work for in 2015. At that time it had 2623 full-time equivalent staff and a sickness absence rate of 3.99%. 61% of staff recommend it as a place for treatment and 58% recommended it as a place to work. The trust halved its £21m agency spend between 2015 and 2019 after introducing a series of workforce benefits. The electronic rostering system has been particularly successful.

== Location ==
The hospital is just south of Central Milton Keynes, off Standing Way (A421, H8) near its junction with Marlborough Street (B4034, V8). It is well served by public transport. Its post-code is MK6 5LD.

== See also ==
- List of hospitals in England
