= Milton Keynes Academy =

The Milton Keynes Academy
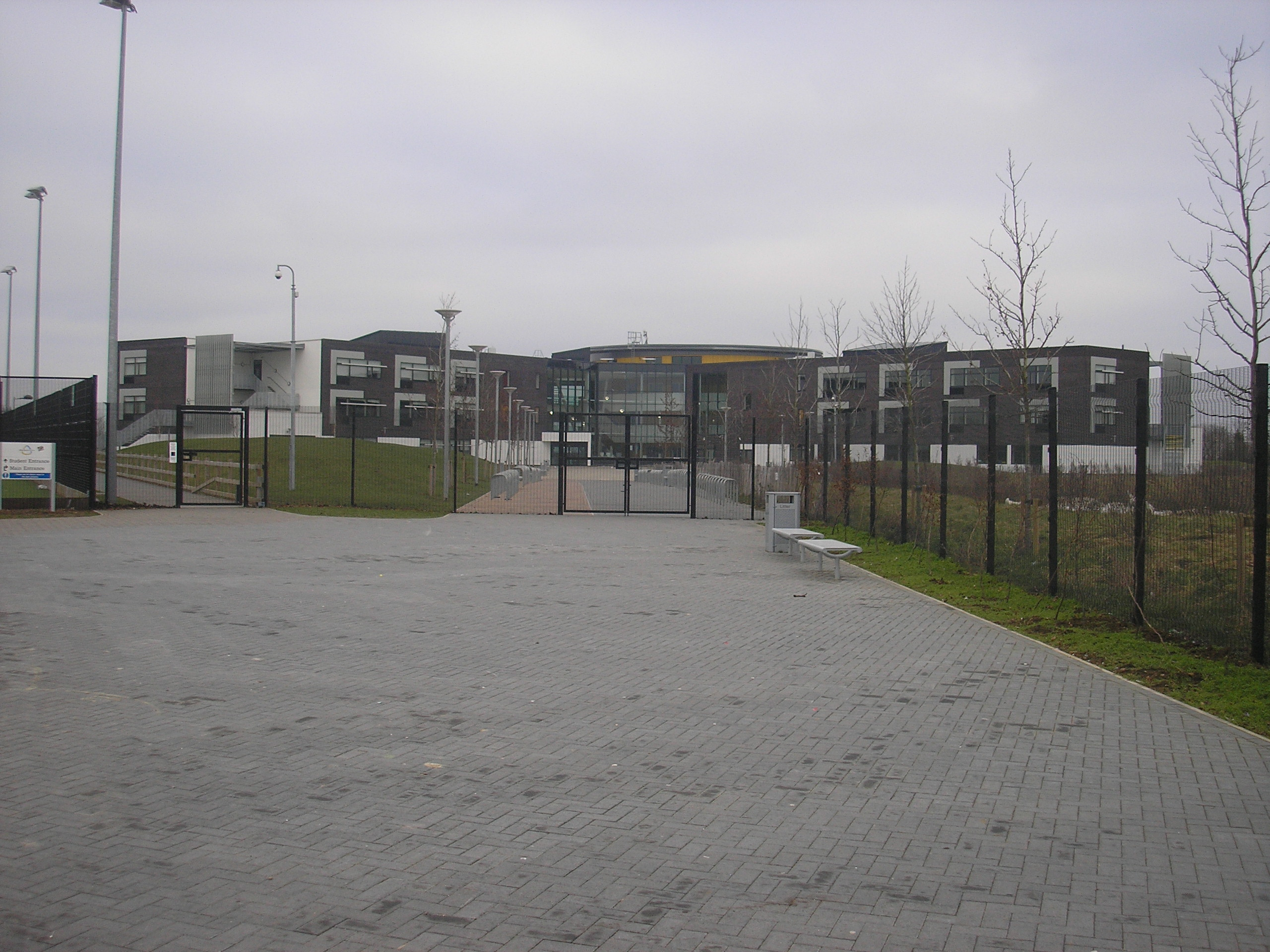

Location
- Fulwood Drive; Milton Keynes, MK6 5LA; England
- Coordinates: 52.0286°N 0.7458°W

Information
- Type: Academy
- Established: 2011
- Local authority: Milton Keynes Council
- Department for Education URN: 135665 Tables
- Principal: Gordon Farquhar
- Gender: Coeducational
- Age: 11 to 16
- Website: http://www.miltonkeynesacademy.co.uk

Milton Keynes Academy (formerly known as the Sir Frank Markham Community School), is a secondary school in Leadenhall, Milton Keynes, United Kingdom. The Academy was built in 2009 on the site of the former Sir Frank Markham Comprehensive School. It is situated adjacent to Milton Keynes College. It specialises in business and enterprise and is designed to cater for 1,550 students.

== Notable former pupils ==
Sir Frank Markham Community School

- Lord Wei - Social entrepreneur, former Govt. advisor on the Big Society and former joint head of the Big Society Network.
- Tania Wiseman - Author and academic,
