= MK Lions Arena =

Basketball arena in Milton Keynes, England

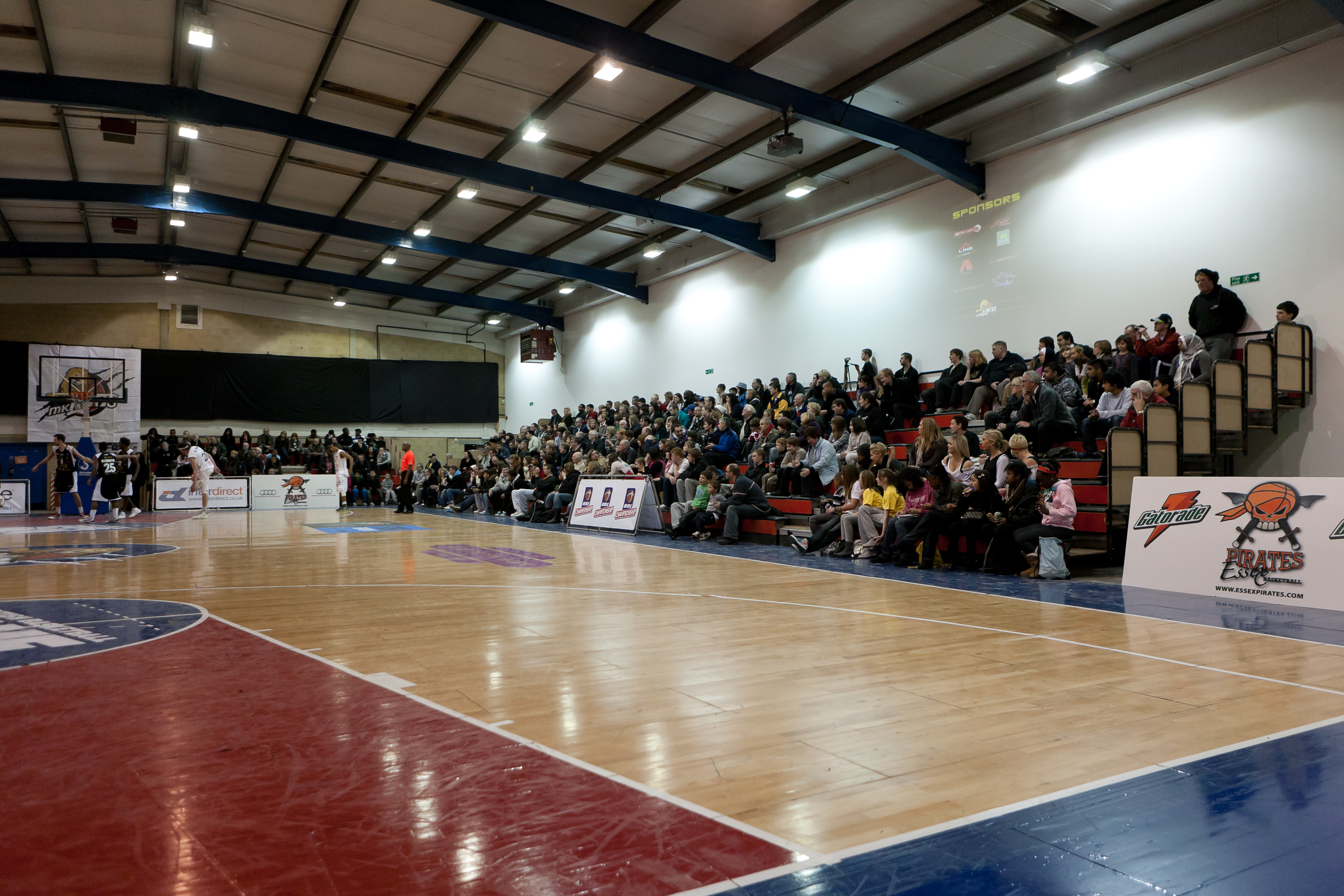
MK Lions Arena

MK Lions Arena, also known as Prestige Homes Arena due to sponsorship reasons, was a basketball arena in Milton Keynes, England. It was the home venue for the Milton Keynes Lions of the British Basketball League from 2010 to 2012.

The venue - a former warehouse - was acquired by the Lions franchise in 2010, after being forced out of their previous homes at the Bletchley Centre - due to a regeneration project - and the temporary set-up at Middleton Hall, in the thecentre:mk. With the team still awaiting the completion of arena:mk - a purpose-built muilti-function arena next to the stadium:mk - an immediate solution was sought and the city centre facility was converted into a new basketball centre for the 2010-11 season.

As well as the main arena, which has seating for 1,400 spectators, the venue featured two practice courts under the same roof of the 30,000 square foot facility. The arena, was located in the Winterhill district, a five-minute walk from the city centre and from Milton Keynes Central railway station.

Lions' first game at the new venue was played on 28 November 2010, with the home team winning 79–73 against BBL rookies Essex Pirates with the game televised live on SkySports.

The lease between Lions and the building owners featured an opt-out cause which was triggered in order to let the building as a retail unit. The final basketball game at the arena was played on 18 April 2012, with Lions defeating Plymouth Raiders 128–113. This proved to be the Lions last ever game in Milton Keynes as the club were forced to re-locate from the 2012–13 season to London, due to being unable to find an alternate venue in the city capable of hosting British Basketball League games.

== See also ==
- Milton Keynes Lions
- Milton Keynes Breakers
