= Milton Keynes College =

FE college in Milton Keynes, UK

Coordinates: 52.023°N 0.757°W

- Motto: Transforming lives through learning
- Type: Public FE
- Established: 1982
- Chancellor: David Meadowcroft
- Principal: Sally Alexander
- Students: 4,000 annually
- Location: Milton Keynes, Buckinghamshire, England
- Campus: Main Campus Chaffron Way (headquarters), Bletchley and Central MK (outer campus facilities)
- Colours: Light blue and white
- Website: http://www.mkcollege.ac.uk/

Milton Keynes College is a general further education and training college, serving the City of Milton Keynes. It also serves the surrounding areas (northern Aylesbury Vale, south Northamptonshire, north west Bedfordshire and north east Oxfordshire). It also provides tertiary education to Foundation Degree level. Its degree-level courses are validated by the Open University and the University of Bedfordshire.

== History ==
Milton Keynes College was created in 1982, when the further education colleges at Wolverton and Bletchley combined. Wolverton College's roots stem back to its association with neighbouring railway works, where it had a reputation for engineering training. The Bletchley College, founded in the early 70s, specialised in general education catering and art and design.

The main "Chaffron Way" Campus in Leadenhall (in Woughton, between Saxon Street and Grafton Street) opened in 1985.

In January 2019, the college won a government contract to provide education in the majority of the long-term prisons in the country.

== Present day ==
The college is the largest provider of further education and training in Milton Keynes, offering a varied mix of vocational courses to a diverse set of students. It also provides a range of part-time, work-based, community-based, and distance-learning courses.

=== Chaffron Way Campus ===
At the front of the campus stands a sculpture 'Unity', designed by Dominic Warpole (an Art, Design and Media student). It is intended to represent the three college campuses and the staff, stakeholders and the community all coming together to support students.

August 2008 saw a £3.5million extension plan on Milton Keynes College’s Chaffron Way campus. The extra 1,300 square feet (120 m^{2}) saw the addition on a new learning resource centre and an IT training suite housing 70 PCs, along with a new library and a new reception area. A large outside court area to provide space for students to socialise in a secure environment was created.

The Chaffron Way Campus teaches Accounting; Business & Administration; Childcare; Computing; Construction (Bricklaying, Carpentry, Plumbing & Electrical Installation); Engineering; English for International Students; Foundation Learning; Health & Social Care; Performing Arts; Retail; Skills; Uniformed Public Services.

=== Bletchley Campus ===
Bletchley Campus teaches Access; Art, Design & Media; Beauty & Holistic Therapy; Floristry, GCSEs and A-Levels; Hairdressing; Hotel, Catering & Hospitality; Motor Vehicle & Motor Sport; Sports Science and Travel and Tourism.

=== Innovation and Technology Centre ===
The Innovation and Technology Centre (also known as the Engineering Building) opened November 2011 on the College's Chaffron Way Campus following investment in modern equipment and facilities. It enables the teaching of advanced design, prototyping, manufacturing and inspection, automation and control, renewable energy and hydraulics, alongside existing classes in engineering and construction. The building itself was part of the former Frank Markham Community School (now demolished), and thus became part of the college.

=== University Centre Milton Keynes ===
Until summer 2012, the University Centre Milton Keynes was associated with the college. Since September 2012, the centre ceased to be part of MK College and has become part of the University of Bedfordshire.

== Ofsted reports ==
Ofsted graded the college as "Good" during the most recent inspection in May 2017, one of only 14 colleges to improve their Ofsted grade in the 2016/17 academic year.

The college had previously been graded as "Requires Improvement" in an inspection carried out in February 2014, and again in June 2015

== See also ==
- Milton Keynes Academy
