= New City College =

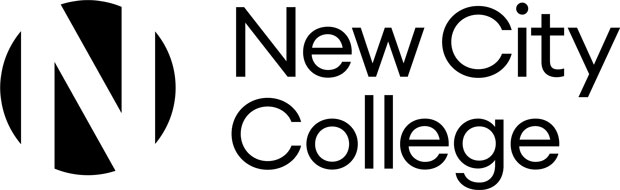

Location
- Poplar High Street, E14 0AF; London; England; 51.5086°N 0.0166°W

Information
- Type: Further education college
- Established: c. 1906–2016 – founding institutions 2016 – New City College
- Local authority: Tower Hamlets, Hackney, Redbridge, Epping Forest, Havering
- Department for Education URN: 130418 Tables
- Ofsted: Reports
- Group Principal: Gerry McDonald
- Gender: Coeducational
- Age: 16+
- Enrolment: 13,000+ (2018–19)
- Website: www.ncclondon.ac.uk

New City College (NCC) is a large college of further education with campuses in east London and Essex. The college was formed in 2016 through the amalgamation of separate colleges, beginning with the merger of Tower Hamlets College and Hackney Community College. This was followed by the gradual additions of Redbridge College, Epping Forest College, and both Havering College of Further and Higher Education, Havering Sixth Form College and Hackney Sixth Form (formerly BSix Sixth Form College). It has been the second-largest provider of post-16 education in the country since 2019.

== Courses ==
Various vocational and academic programmes are offered across New City Colleges such as A levels, T Levels, BTECs, ESOL programmes and Higher Education courses.

== History and sites ==
The college has 9 buildings and 5 campuses around London and Essex: Redbridge (Ilford and Chadwell Heath), Tower Hamlets (Poplar and Arbour Square), Hackney, Epping Forest (Debden) and Havering (Ardleigh Green, Rainham and Hornchurch). All of these were inherited from its predecessors. The college is partnered with Tottenham Hotspur Football Club, with Tottenham's academy staff providing professional coaching to students of all genders in support of the college's sports courses.

=== Tower Hamlets ===
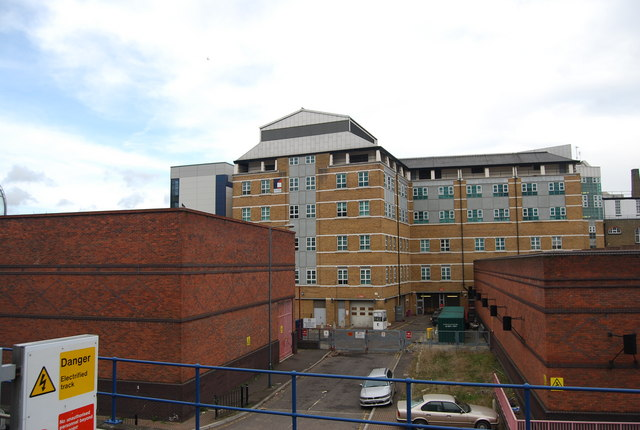
Tower Hamlets main campus

The largest building of the Tower Hamlets campus is on Poplar High Street, about 700 m north of Canary Wharf; the others are at Arbour Square, Bethnal Green and the TowerSkills on East India Dock Road.

The college is housed in the former building of the School of Marine Engineering and Navigation established by the London County Council opened in 1906. This later evolved into Poplar Technical College, which retained a maritime focus. Tower Hamlets College (THC) was established in 1990.

The College faced increasing competition at sixth form provision from local schools in Tower Hamlets and underwent an OFSTED inspection in December 2013 which awarded the College good college status (Ofsted, December 2013) As of 2009/10 the college had 18,986 enrolments, of which 66% were adults age 19 and over.

The College launched the Attlee A Level Academy in 2019 at its Arbour Square Centre in Stepney. This is a specific A Level centre dedicated to high achievement and university progression. It is named after the UK's post-war prime minister Clement Attlee who was committed to positive social change and opportunity for all. It was opened by Attlee's great grandson and the college continues to have strong links with the Attlee Foundation which has the mission 'opportunity for all'.

=== Hackney (Hoxton) ===
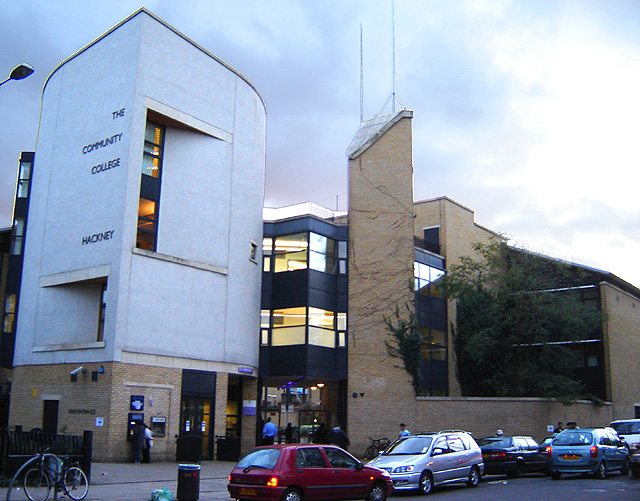
Hackney Community College in 2005

Its campus is in Falkirk Street in Hoxton, backing onto Hoxton Street. When the campus opened in 1996, it was Britain's largest capital further education building project.

The college was originally named Hackney College when it was formed in 1974 by the amalgamation of Hackney and Stoke Newington College of Further Education with those sites of Poplar Technical College that had been established in Hackney. It was initially run by Inner London Education Authority (ILEA) and, following that, by Hackney Council, when it was renamed. For a few years it was known as The Community College Shoreditch, but later reverted to the name Hackney Community College (dating from the process known as "incorporation" in 1993 when it was formed from the merger of Hackney College, Hackney Sixth Form Centre and Hackney Adult Education Institute, as a result of the Further and Higher Education Act 1992). In August 2016, Hackney Community College merged with Tower Hamlets to create a larger organisation, named New City College.

It is home to the Tech City Apprenticeship, the London Technical Fashion Academy, the London City Hospitality Centre and its training restaurant, Open Kitchen.

HCC's SPACe (Sport and Performing Arts Centre) was funded by Sport England as a centre of excellence in cricket and basketball. SPACe was home to London United Basketball. It is now branded New City Fitness and is still the base for the Hackney Community College Basketball Academy, as well as academies in other sports and is open to the public as a commercial gym. The impressive sports centre was used as a training camp for basketball during the London 2012 Olympic and Paralympic Games.

=== Hackney (Clapton) ===
In August 2024 BSix Sixth Form College in Clapton joined New City College as a new site. Before September 2002, this was one of the sites of the Hackney College. From 2002 to 2024 the site was operated as an independent sixth form college.

==== Previous Hackney institutions ====
The modern version of the term should also be distinguished from previous Hackney Colleges:

- One name for the dissenting academy set up by Calvinists in Homerton (in the parish of Hackney) in 1786, also known in various accounts as Homerton Academy, or Homerton College. In these years it attracted some notable students, including William Hazlitt. In 1850 it split into two parts. The teacher training component moved to Cambridge, where it is still known as Homerton College; the theological functions stayed in London as part of the three-college merger that created New College London.
- One name for the seminary co-founded by George Collison (b. 1772 – d. 1847). It was also known as Hackney Academy or Hackney Theological Seminary, or Hackney Itineracy, but became best known as the Hackney College after 1871, a name which stuck even after its 1887 move to Finchley Road in Hampstead, North London. Its principal at about this time was Peter Taylor Forsyth.

Hackney and New College Act 1924
- Act of Parliament
- Parliament of the United Kingdom
- Long title: An Act to unite the Hackney College Foundation and the New College London Foundation in one corporation to be called Hackney and New College and for other purposes.
- Citation: 14 & 15 Geo. 5. c. xliii

Dates
- Royal assent: 14 July 1924

Text of statute as originally enacted

Both of these merged in 1900, becoming the University of London's first Faculty of Theology. This became, by the Hackney and New College Act 1924 (14 & 15 Geo. 5. c. xliii), a constituent college known as Hackney and New College, the two names by which its disparate buildings throughout north London were commonly known. In 1934 new premises were planned. In 1936, the name of the college was simplified to New College London, harking back to the Congregationalist merger of 1850.

=== Redbridge ===
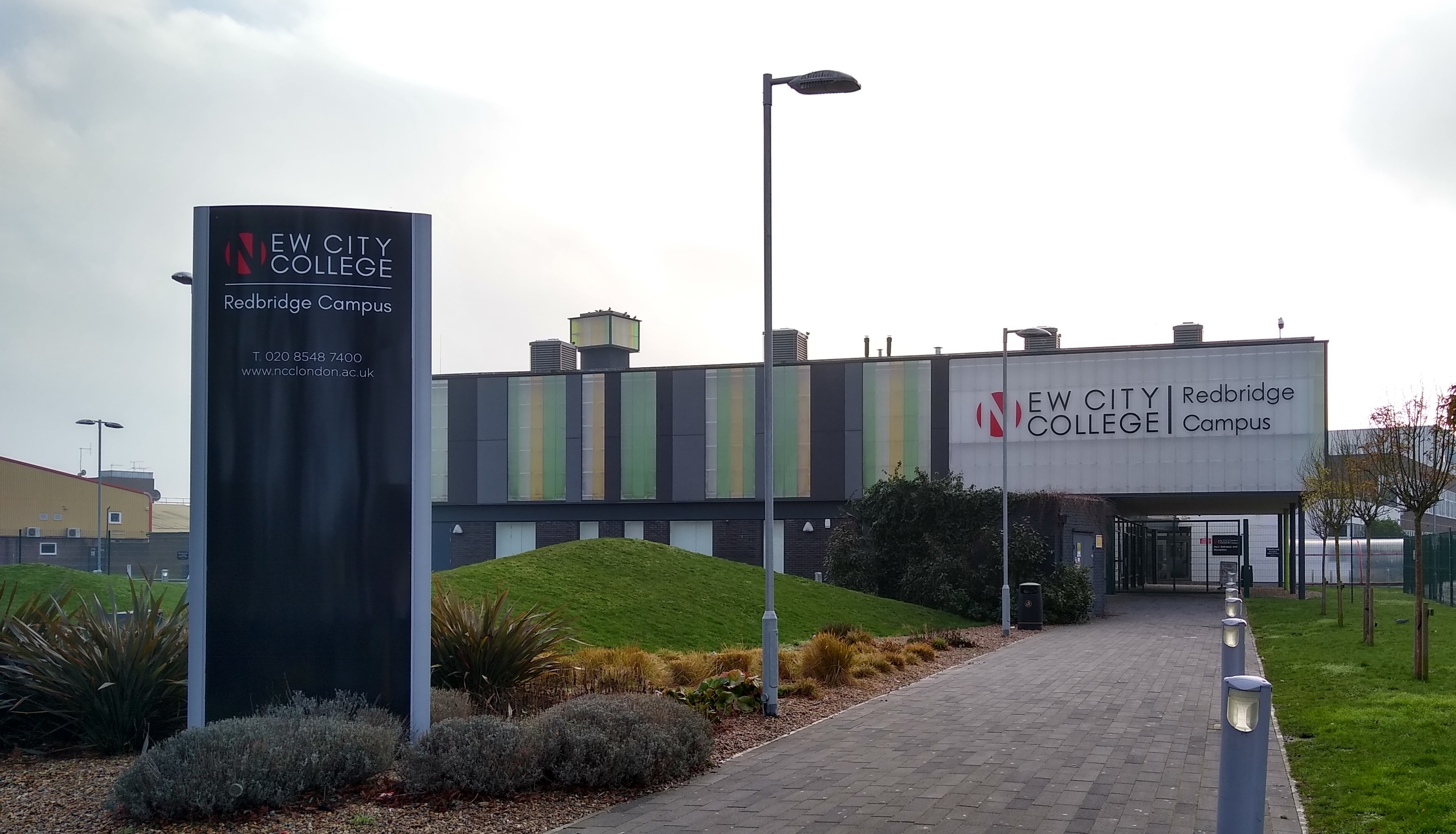
New City College Redbridge Campus, near King George Hospital

The Redbridge Campus has two sites in Ilford, one in the town centre and another next to King George Hospital.

Redbridge College began life as Redbridge Technical College on 2 June 1970. It offered vocational courses in a range of subjects. It was once a major centre for deaf students or those with learning difficulties. The college merged into New City College in 2017.

=== Epping Forest ===
The Epping Forest campus is located in Borders Lane in Debden, a suburb of Loughton.

Epping Forest College was founded in 1989 as a tertiary college after the re-organisation of post-16 education in south-west Essex. It was created from the Loughton College of Further Education and the sixth forms from seven local secondary schools. Due to financial and quality issues, the college merged with New City College in 2018, a move that was protested by Epping Forest District council fearing it would lose community focus.

=== Havering Sixth Form College ===
Havering Sixth Form College, part of the New City College Group, is a high achieving sixth form college in Wingletye Lane, Hornchurch in the London Borough of Havering, east London, England. Built on the site of Dury Falls Secondary School, it opened in September 1991, and educates full-time students from the ages of 16 to 19. The college offers a wide range of subjects, in A-level, BTEC and diploma formats, amongst others.

=== Havering College ===
Havering College is part of New City College since it merged with the NCC Group in 2019. The main campus is on Ardleigh Green Road. It is also linked to the New City College Rainham campus which was significantly re-built and re-opened in 2020.

== Notable alumni ==
- Kate Osamor – Labour Party politician (Hackney College)
- Darius Defoe – Newcastle Eagles player (Hackney College)
- Dire Straits guitarist and singer Mark Knopfler lectured at the Epping Forest site when it was known as Loughton College
- Micheal Ward – actor (Epping Forest College)
- Alan Davies - actor, comedian (Loughton College)
- Simon Woolley, Baron Woolley of Woodford – Politician and activist (Epping Forest College)
- Coco Khan, writer and presenter
