= David Aliu =

British basketball player (born 1981)

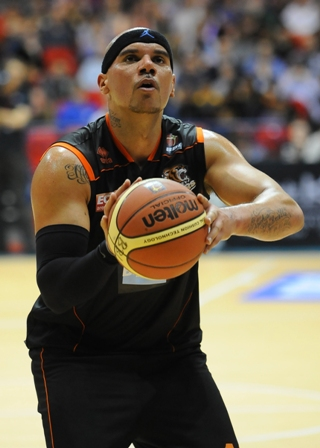

Personal information
- Born: 13 March 1981 (age 45) Liverpool, England
- Listed height: 1.98 m (6 ft 6 in)

Career information
- High school: Notre Dame Academy (Middleburg, Virginia)
- College: Morehead State University (2000–2004)
- NBA draft: 2004: undrafted
- Playing career: 2004–2016
- Position: Power forward
- Number: 11

Career history
- 2004: Scottish Rocks
- 2005: Tindastóll
- 2005–2006: Hamar/Selfoss
- 2006–2007: Leicester Riders
- 2006–2007: Þór Þorlákshöfn
- 2007: Celso Míguez Procolor
- 2007–2008: Everton Tigers
- 2008–2009: Lausanne
- 2010–2012: Mersey Tigers
- 2012–2014: Manchester Giants
- 2014–2016: Cheshire Phoenix

Career highlights
- BBL champion (2011); BBL Trophy winner (2011)

David Aliu (born 13 March 1981) is a British former basketball player. He last played for Cheshire Phoenix in the British Basketball League (BBL). Aliu was part of the Mersey Tigers' treble-winning 2010/11 team, and in November 2011, became the Tigers' record points scorer in the BBL.

== Early life and career ==
Born in Liverpool, England, Aliu started playing basketball at the age of 14 in his home town of Liverpool, playing for local side Toxteth Tigers. He landed a scholarship in the US, playing at the Notre Dame Academy in Virginia, before moving on to and graduating from Morehead State University, Kentucky in 2004.

== Professional career ==
The power forward made his British Basketball League debut on 01/10/2004 playing for Scottish Rocks against Newcastle Eagles, and he went on to make 11 appearances for the Rocks, averaging 6.27 PPG.

He then moved on to play for three teams in the Icelandic Úrvalsdeild karla - Tindastóll (15.7 ppg and 5.0 rpg), Hamar/Selfoss (20.7 ppg and 8.9 rpg) and Þór Þorlákshöfn (23.6 ppg and 9.5 rpg) - from 2005 to 2007, with a short spell at Leicester Riders in the BBL in the middle.

After a brief spell with Celso Míguez Procolor in Spain, Aliu returned to his home city to play for the new professional franchise, Everton Tigers.

He averaged 15.8 points per game in 33 appearances for the Tigers, before leaving to play for BBC Lausanne in Switzerland. He took a year out of the sport following the birth of his daughter, but returned to the re-branded Mersey Tigers for the 2010/11 season. Aliu won the BBL Championship, BBL Trophy and BBL play-off titles, playing alongside Great Britain players Andrew Sullivan and Nate Reinking, in a very successful season.

In August 2011, Aliu signed a new two-year deal with the Tigers to keep him at the club until the end of the 2012/13 season.

In September 2012, Aliu signed with a contract with the Manchester Giants.

In June 2014, Aliu signed a two-year contract with the Cheshire Phoenix. On 20 July 2016 Aliu retired from basketball.

== Other Notes ==
Aliu was the first person to score a basket at the ECHO Arena in Liverpool.
