= Hackney Community College Basketball Academy =

Basketball programme in London, England

Coordinates: 51.5303°N 0.0784°W

The Hackney Community College's Basketball Academy is a basketball programme located in the London Borough of Hackney in the United Kingdom. It was originally designed to engage young people vulnerable to exclusion from education to gain qualifications through engagement with a sport in which they demonstrated talent and potential.

== History ==
The programme was launched in September 2001 following the opening of the College's SPACe Sports Centre in Shoreditch in February that year. Construction of SPACe was funded by Sport England as a Centre of Excellence in basketball and cricket. Following the success of the Football Academy set up by Malcolm Williams in 1996, the College's Sport, Leisure and Tourism team designed the basketball programme. A Cricket Academy Programme was launched along similar lines by the same HCC team in 2002.

An athletics academy was established in 2007. The basketball academy has grown and experienced unprecedented success on court and in developing players aged between 16 and 20 (men and women) from all over London, as well as enhancing their life chances through qualifications gained whilst studying at Hackney College.

Operating in an area recognised historically as a hot-bed of basketball development and talent thanks to the work carried out by Joe White at Homerton House School and Hackney White Heat along with the success of East London Royals Basketball Club and Haringey Angels Women, HCCA coaches Tony Garbelotto (co-founder with Joe White of the London Towers Junior Programme in the 1990s), Solomon Ayinla, Andrea Norton and Sam Stiller have helped develop over 250 players since 2001. Players such as Darius Defoe, Perry Lawson, Serhat Urkut Jeff Danchie and Jean Wakanena have graduated to play professionally for Newcastle Eagles and Plymouth Raiders in the British Basketball League. Eddie Morrison (MK Lions) and Darrell Bethune (Everton Tigers) also went on to play in the BBL in the 2008/09 season. Samuel Toluwase entered the BBL with Essex Pirates (2009/10 season). In 2011/12, Courtney Van Beest joined Worcester Wolves and Albert Margai Guildford Heat. Many others have represented England and Great Britain at junior level and have moved on to US high school/college programmes and British universities.

== Programme overview ==
Academy players train for 2 hours every week-day and play matches on Wednesday afternoons and Friday evenings in a variety of competitions. From an initial fixture list of 25 matches in 2001/02, all Academy teams now play a combined total close to 100 matches per season. In 2008/09, Academy teams played 77 competitive matches in 13 different competitions, winning 6 titles and finishing runners-up in 2. Academy Teams had a 66/11 winning record in 08/09. The programme is fully inclusive. Students who want to learn/improve their basketball skills train alongside the "elite" players. These players form the HCCA B Team and have won the South East Student Sports Association (SESSA) Cups and Premier League for 4 of the last 7 years. In July 2009, HCCA became the only inner-London academy (and one of only 12 nationally, expanding to 20 in 2010) accredited by England Basketball to deliver the AASE programme to talented players from September 2009 onwards.

== Achievements ==
On-court success has been constant over the last ten seasons and unrivalled by any other College Academy Programme in the UK (of which there are now many). HCCA U19 Men went unbeaten in any National competition from 2002 to 2008 and won the British Colleges Sport (BCS) National Championship from 2004 to 2008 (5 years in succession), finishing 3rd in 2009, regaining the title in 2010 and winning both BCS and English Schools (ESBBA) National Academies Cups for the last six years. HCCA Under 19 Women have also won all their equivalent BCS and ESBBA Cups and Championships over the last six years. The HCCA Women also won the World Corporate Games title in Leeds (August 2008). The Senior Men (all under 20) have won the London Metropolitan Basketball League Premier Division Championship for seven out of the last nine years regaining the title in 08/09, retaining it in 2009/10 and defending the title in 2010/11 and 2011/12. HCCA won the LMBL Men's Cup for the first time in 07/08 and became the first team in the history of the LMBL to complete the Premier Division/Cup double in 2011/12. Four HCCA players were selected to represent Great Britain U 20 Men in the European Youth Championships in Romania (August 2008). Not only was this more than from any other single Academy programme, these players were also the only ones to be selected from a British development programme. These players were Darrell Bethune, Ali Fullah, Michael Ochareobia and Orlan Jackman (HCCA 2005/06)

The aggregate total of matches played by HCCA teams between September 2001 and June 2009 is 567 of which 504 were won, a win percentage of 88.9%. A combined total of 92 competitions and tournaments have been entered by HCCA teams over the last 8 full seasons. 66 of these have been won and HCCA have been runner's up in a further 13, an overall success rate of 72%.

HCCA Coach Tony Garbelotto is now Head Coach of Everton Tigers (now Mersey Tigers) and former Lead Assistant Head Coach of the Great Britain national basketball team(men) and led Tigers to the BBL Cup victory beating Plymouth Raiders, BBL Championship and BBL Play-Off runner's up in his first season (2008/09)and winning the BBL Play-Off title in May 2010. He left HCCA to take up the Everton Tigers (now Mersey Tigers) post in April 2008. HCCA Coach Solomon Ayinla is a former pro player (Europe and the UK), Assistant Coach with the Nigerian National team and Head Coach of the London Metropolitan University Basketball Programme (runners-up in the BUCS Championship in 2006 and 2007). Ayinla guided London Met Men from England Basketball Div 4 to Div 1 (2009/10) in consecutive seasons. London Mets won the England Basketball Senior Men's National Trophy in March 2010. This was achieved with teams made up predominately of present players and graduates of the HCCA programme. Well publicised financial difficulties experienced by London Met University in 2010 saw the National League programme disbanded later the same year. Chris Morris was Programme Administrator for HCCA since it was established in 2001 until December 2010. At the London Olympic Basket ball Test Event in 2011 Morris was Team Attache for Great Britain and Men and for the gold medal winning USA Men at the 2012 Olympic Tournament. He fulfilled the same role for the South Africa Men's Wheelchair Basketball Team at the London 2012 Paralympics. From December 2017 to February 2024 Morris was Team Manager and Head of Delegation for the Great Britain Men's Basketball Team. Morris also led a team of volunteers providing Althlete and Para-Athlete Transport Services at the 2017 World Athletics Championship in London.

The name "SPACe", home of the HCC Basketball Academy, derives from Sport and Performing Arts Centre. See Hackney Space Centre. Joe White died in December 2002 (aged 39). Malcolm Williams died in May 2006 (aged 68). In October 2006 SPACe sports hall was named in honour of Malcolm Williams, recognition of the work he carried out at Hackney Community College. A plaque commemorating the dedication was unveiled by Lord Sebastian Coe who had been a close friend of Malcolm for many years.

== List of titles ==
=== Senior Men ===
- London Metropolitan Basketball Premier League Champions 2004, 2005, 2007, 2009, 2010, 2011, 2012
  - Runner's Up 2008 (Rocco's Raiders), 2006 (Camden Knights)
- LMBL Division 1 North Winners 2003 (promoted to Premier Division)
- LMBL Cup Winners 2008 (White Heat),2012 (Westminster Warriors)
  - Runner's Up 2011 (Westminster Warriors), 2009 (Rocco's Raiders), 2007 (MacPro), 2005 (White Heat)
- SESSA Men's Cup Winners 2002, 2003 (HCCA B), 2004 (Middlesex University), 2005 (Chichester University), 2006 (Kingston University)
  - Runner's Up 2007, 2008 (LSBU in both years)
- SESSA Men's Premier League Champions 2002, 2003, 2004, 2005, 2006 (B team)
  - Runner's Up 2008 and 2009 (University of East London, Milton Keynes Lions Academy)
- SESSA Men's Tournament Winners 2002 (Anglia Polytechnic University)
- SESSA Men's Div 1 Winners 2004/5, (B Team promoted to Premier League)
- Operation Trident Tournament Winners 2010

=== Under 19 Men's Titles ===
- British Colleges Sport (BCS) National Champions 2004 (East Durham Academy), 2005 (South Notts College), 2006 (Matthew Boulton College), 2007 (Matthew Boulton College), 2008 (Richmond-upon-Thames College Academy), 2010 (Birmingham Met College),2011 (Derby College) 3rd 2009
- BCS National Cup Winners 2005 (Middlesbrough College), 2006 (East Durham Academy), 2007 (Filton College Academy)
- BCS "Elite" Cup 2008 (Moulton College Academy)1st year of comp. 2010 (Loreto College Academy), 2011 (Loreto College Academy)
- BCS National Academy League - South East Divisional Champions 2007, 2008 - East Div Champions 2009/10, 2010/11
- BCS National Academy League Champions 2009 (Milton Keynes Lions Academy),2010 (Loreto College Academy),3rd 2011 (Loreto)
- BCS South East Regional Runner's Up 2002 (Richmond-upon Thames College Academy)
- BCS Eastern England Regional Champions - 2003 (Moulton College Academy), 2004 (Cambridge Regional College), 2005 (South East Essex 6th Form College SEEVIC), 2006 (Suffolk Regional College) 2007 (Havering 6th Form College), 2008 (SEEC), 2009 (SEEC), 2010 (SEEVIC)
- BCS London Regional Champions 2012
- English Schools Basketball Assoc. (ESBBA) National Academy Cup Winners 2005 (Cardinal Newman College Academy, 2006 (Loreto 6th Form College), 2007 (Barking Abbey School Academy), 2008 (Barking Abbey School Academy), 2009 (Barking Abbey School Academy)
- England Basketball National Under 19 Schools/College Cup Winners 2010 (Birmingham Met College)1st (and only) year of competition, replacing ESBBA National Academy Cup

=== Senior Women's Titles ===
- World Corporate Games Champions - 2008 (Leeds Metropolitan University)
- Shoreditch Corporate Games Champions - 2008 (BNP ParisBas)
- SESSA Women's Premier League Champions - 2003, 2004, 2005, 2006, 2007, 2008 (no competition 2009 onwards)
- SESSA Women's Cup Winners -2004, 2005 (Hertfordshire University), 2006 (Kingston University), 2007 (LSBU), 2008 (Kingston University) (no competition 2009 onwards)

=== Under 19 Women's National Titles ===
- BCS National Champions - 2006 (Bilborough College, Notts), 2007 (Peter Symonds College, Winchester), 2008 (Holy Cross 6th Form College, Bury), 2010 (Tyne Met College),2012(Burnley College). 3rd 2009, 4th 2011
- BCS National Cup Winners - 2007 (Moulton College Academy), 2008 (Newcastle College Academy), 2010 (Hartlepool College Academy)
  - Runner's Up 2006 (Bilborough College), 2009 (Loreto College Academy)
- BCS Eastern England Regional Champions - 2004 (Moulton College), 2005 (SEEVIC), 2006 (SEEVIC), 2007 (SEEVIC), 2008 (SEEVIC), 2009 (COLVIC), 2010 (COWA), 2011 (COLVIC)
- ESBBA National Academy Cup Winners - 2006 (Moulton College)
  - Runner's Up - 2007 (Barking Abbey School Academy), 2008 (Barking Abbey School Academy)
