= Mersey Tigers =

Former British basketball team

- League: British Basketball League
- Established: 2007
- Folded: 2013
- History: Everton Tigers; 2007–2010; Mersey Tigers; 2010–2013
- Arena: Knowsley Park
- Capacity: 500
- Location: Liverpool, England

The Mersey Tigers were a professional basketball team based in the city of Liverpool, England. The club was established in 2007 as a start-up franchise of the British Basketball League, the country's elite competition. The Tigers started competing at the start of the 2007–08 season, and won the BBL Cup in their second season as well as finishing as runners-up in the league. In 2013 it was officially announced that the Tigers franchise had been withdrawn from the BBL due to financial difficulties that had plagued the club throughout the previous season, which resulted in the Tigers becoming the first ever BBL club to complete an entire season without a single victory.

Previously, under the name Everton Tigers, the club was an Official Partner of the Everton Football Club organisation and an amalgam of the Toxteth Tigers community youth programme which started in 1968. The club also operated the Tigers Basketball Academy in partnership with Childwall Academy, founded in 2009. However, in July 2010 Everton withdrew funding and the club re-launched as Mersey Tigers.

== Franchise history ==
=== Establishment ===
The Everton Tigers was officially presented as the 12th member of the British Basketball League on 19 June 2007, after a professional basketball franchise was awarded to the city of Liverpool based on a sound business plan, community focus and their association with a Premier League football club.

The club was part of Bill Kenwright's Everton F.C. organisation, who became the fifth football club in the history of British basketball to field a basketball team, following in the footsteps of Manchester United, Glasgow Rangers, Portsmouth and Newcastle United (now Newcastle Eagles).

Based around the community work of Everton Football Club, headed by Gary Townsend, and existing community basketball club Toxteth Tigers, the new club specifically targeted youth development as one of the main goals, while the senior team was to be spearheaded by Henry Mooney, head of the Toxteth programme.

On 17 August it was announced that Tigers would be using the Greenbank Sports Academy in Sefton Park as their home venue which holds a capacity for 800 spectators. However, according to various articles in the media it is believed that the long-term ambition of the club is to occupy the 7,513-seat capacity Echo Arena, which was completed in early 2008.

=== 2007–08 season ===
After months of speculation in the rumour mill prior to the season opening, Everton boasted several high-profile signings including that of Chris Haslam, Calvin Davis and BBL veteran Delme Herriman. The players were officially presented in front of 40,000 fans at Goodison Park on 20 September, during the half-time of the football team's UEFA Cup home game against FC Metalist Kharkiv. The assembled squad played their first ever game on 29 September 2007, an exhibition match away to neighbouring Manchester Magic. Despite trailing for most of the match, with Magic leading 71–62 in the final two minutes, Tigers salvaged the match and pulled together a 14–0 run, storming to a 71–76 victory.

Tigers' inaugural league campaign tipped-off with an away defeat to Plymouth Raiders on 6 October. Despite early domination from the Tigers, they consistently lost the lead throughout the game and lost 82–73, with Chris Haslam and Tony Robertson both posting 21 points each. The Tigers' first home game, on 12 October, also ended in defeat, with visiting fellow rookies London Capital running out 58-69 winners at Greenbank. The clubs' first main sponsor for the 2007–08 season was announced the following week, the press release stating that locally based Bibby Maritime Ltd, the world's leading provider of floating accommodation, had agreed a deal to partner the first team and their development teams with sponsorship.

An impressive start to the season for the rookie franchise was buoyed in December, when coach Henry Mooney pulled off a major coup with the signing of Great Britain international Richard Midgley from Newcastle Eagles. Liverpool's interest in its new local basketball team developed significantly as the season progressed, and with this in mind, the club moved the local derby home game against Cheshire Jets from their usual Greenbank home to the brand-new Echo Arena, selling out the entire 7,513-seat capacity venue within days of tickets going on sale. The match was also the first time the Tigers featured in a live televised broadcast, through the league's partnership with Setanta Sports. The historic game was played on 19 March 2008 and the capacity crowd witnessed a spirited Tigers suffer defeat, finishing 80–103. The team completed their rookie season with a 16–17 record, finishing in 7th place and qualifying for the end-of-season play-offs, an incredible achievement for any brand-new franchise. The fairytale season, came to an abrupt end however in the quarter-final of the play-offs, with the Tigers going down 81–72 away to eventual champions Guildford Heat.

=== 2008–09 season ===
The club looked to build on the success of their first season by appointing Tony Garbelotto, assistant coach of Great Britain, as the new first team coach. The announcement was made on 30 April, and also indicated that Garbelotto's predecessor Henry Mooney would take the reins as Head of Basketball Development. Garbelotto's first signing of the season was announced several weeks later, with the capture of veteran star Tony Dorsey from Guildford adding to a roster that already included Delme Herriman, John Simpson, Richard Midgley and Chris Haslam. James Jones, also from Guildford, was the second confirmed signing of the summer on 10 July. Following the inclusion of Andre Smith and Marcus Bailey on the new-look roster, the Tigers' secured a massive coup with the signing of Josh Gross from Austin Toros of the NBA D-League where he averaged 14 points-per-game in 45 games. Despite the impressive signings, an under-strength Tigers lost their opening game, an exhibition with Manchester Magic at the Echo Arena, going down to a 61–65 defeat, while a pre-season three-game series in Belgium with Dexia Mons-Hainaut and Antwerp Diamond Giants, ended 1–2.

The Tigers opened their league campaign with a comprehensive 61-80 demolition of Sheffield Sharks in Sheffield, summer signing Andre Smith posted a game-high 29 points and collected 15 rebounds on his way to claiming the MVP. A week later, Tigers destroyed London Capital 107–69 at Greenbank, Andre Smith again in the limelight with 33 points. Tigers' first loss of the season came on 24 October, at home to Worcester Wolves, in which the visitors scalped a 101–106 victory with Smith again recording a 32-point haul and contributing to his Player of the Month award for October. During the same week, following the release of John Simpson, Tigers announced the signing of Olu Babalola.

After eliminating Sheffield (69-88) and Milton Keynes Lions (75-97) in the BBL Cup, the Tigers found themselves in a semi-final match-up with last season's runner-up Newcastle Eagles and just one round away from the team's first-ever appearance in a major final. Newcastle edged the first leg with a 112–105 victory at the Metro Radio Arena however Everton rallied and with a 97–86 victory – 202–198 over the series – subsequently reached the Final for the first time in history, where they would face the Plymouth Raiders. The game was played at the traditional home of the BBL Cup, the National Indoor Arena in Birmingham on 18 January 2009. Although on paper the teams were closely matched, Tigers went on to destroy the Raiders and write themselves into the history books, not only by claiming their first piece of silverware but also by recording the biggest winning margin in BBL history, showing no mercy in a 103–49 victory.

A month later and the Tigers, having finished top of BBL Trophy Group 2, found themselves in another semi-final clash with Newcastle, who took revenge by scrapping to an 82–88 victory in Liverpool, dumping Everton out of the competition. The Tigers finished the regular season as runner-up to Newcastle, with a 24–9 record (1-2 against the Eagles), and qualified as second seed for the post-season play-off in which they were drawn to play Scottish Rocks. Everton made light work of the game and progressed to the Finals Weekend in Birmingham with an 84–64 home victory. Despite staking a claim for the league's MVP award, Andre Smith didn't travel with his team to Birmingham for personal reasons and didn't figure throughout the weekend. The Semi-final, against the season's surprise package Leicester Riders was equally as straightforward as the quarter-final, sweeping past the Riders 81–65, and thus Everton qualified for its first ever Play-off Final, facing familiar foes in the form of Newcastle Eagles. The match proved to be one of the most memorable in recent years and even though it was Newcastle who prevailed in a close contest, winning 87–84, it was Everton who stole the show. After trailing for most of the game, the Tigers found themselves 70-52 down at the end of the third quarter. Down but not out, Great Britain international Richard Midgley fought valiantly and his 36-point haul – a new record in Final's history – helped Everton claw back to within 2 points of the leading Eagles. But with only 9 seconds left, and Everton in the penalty, their forced fouls were enough for Newcastle to hold on and win the game.

=== 2009–10 season ===
Olu Babalola was the first player to recommit to the Tigers, signing a new contract on 16 July, while coach Tony Garbelotto was on a scouting mission in Las Vegas at the NBA Summer League. In a quest to develop future talent, the club announced the launch of the new Everton Tigers Basketball Academy in partnership with Childwall Sports College. On the eve on the new season, the franchise announced that Chairman Gary Townsend would be stepping down to assume a similar role at football club Notts County, to be replaced by Vice-chairman Martyn Best. This could have been a huge loss for the club, having already lost star player Richard Midgley, who retired through injury earlier in the summer. However, Best, a co-founder of PR agency Paver smith, and Henry Mooney, helped secure the ongoing support of Everton football club as Official Partner and has helped stabilise the Tigers. On-court, the Tigers opened the season with an away defeat to Leicester (95-98), new signing Dzaflo Larkai making his debut by posting 22 points. The first home fixture with visiting Guildford was played out of the Echo Arena, and saw the hosts conquer in an 85–79 victory. Tigers' defence of their BBL Cup crown didn't last long as the holders crashed out in the quarter-final following an overtime defeat to Sheffield, 99–90.

Despite many challenges facing the Tigers during this third season, they overcame injuries to Kevin Bell and James Jones, the untimely departure of Larkei, and kept in contention for a top 5 spot all season. Trey Moore joined towards the end of the season, and the team gained a strong momentum as the play-offs loomed. Kevin Bell's return from a hand injury helped propel the Tigers to the play-off final, with in particular to crushing defeats of Newcastle Eagles. The play-off final against the Glasgow Rocks showed the full spirit of the Tigers, and a great comeback by the Rocks was halted for a stirring and nerve-jangling 8 point win for the Tigers. Kevin Bell was MVP, and Chris Hulme received an emotional send-off in his last professional game.

During the close season, Gary Townsend returned to Liverpool and took ownership of the franchise with the Everton Tigers becoming the Mersey Tigers, and another new age for the Tigers began.

Tony Garbelotto began his third season as head coach with the audacious signing of GB captain and former Eagle, Drew Sullivan. Tigers favourites James Jones and Andrew Thompson signed on their for third and second season's respectively.

== Home arenas ==
Greenbank Sports Academy (2007–2010)
Echo Arena (2008–2011)
Knowsley Leisure & Culture Park (2011–2013)

== Trophies ==
=== League ===
- BBL Championship Winners: 2010/11
- BBL Championship Runners Up: 2008/09

=== Playoffs ===
- BBL Championship Play Off Winners: 2009/10, 2010/11
- BBL Championship Play Off Runners Up: 2008/09

=== Cup ===
- BBL Cup Winners: 2008/09
- BBL Cup Runners Up: 2010/11

=== Trophy ===
- BBL Trophy Winners: 2010/11

== Season-by-season records ==
Season	Division	Tier	Regular Season						Post-Season	Trophy	Cup	Head coach
Season	Division	Tier	Finish	Played	Wins	Losses	Points	Win %	Post-Season	Trophy	Cup	Head coach
Everton Tigers
2007–2008	BBL	1	7th	33	16	17	32	0.485	Quarter-finals	1st round (BT)	1st round (BC)	Henry Mooney
2008–2009	BBL	1	2nd	33	24	9	48	0.727	Runners Up	Semi-finals (BT)	Winners, beating Plymouth	Tony Garbelotto
2009–2010	BBL	1	5th	36	21	15	42	0.583	Winners, beating Glasgow	Semi-finals (BT)	Quarter-finals (BC)	Tony Garbelotto
Mersey Tigers
2010–2011	BBL	1	1st	33	25	8	50	0.758	Winners, beating Sheffield	Winners, beating Guildford	Runners Up	Tony Garbelotto
2011–2012	BBL	1	10th	30	10	20	20	0.333	Did not qualify	1st round (BT)	Quarter-finals (BC)	Tony Garbelotto
2012–2013	BBL	1	12th	33	0	33	0	0.000	Did not qualify	1st round (BT)	1st round (BC)	Tony Walsh

== Players ==
=== Final roster ===
Note: Flags indicate national team, as has been defined under FIBA eligibility rules. Players may hold more than one non-FIBA nationality.

No.	Pos.	Nat.	Player
	PG	(England) ENG	Jack Hudson
	SF	(England) ENG	Osemweggie Semi Ebogbe
	PG	(England) ENG	Josh McGinn
	G	(Belgium) BEL	Gael Hulsen
	F	(Spain) ESP	Martin Calvo
	F	(England) ENG	Chris Bigley
	F	(England) ENG	Daniel Pilkington
	F	(England) ENG	Ryan Gallagher
	F	(England) ENG	Nathan Schall
	SF	(Spain) ESP	Daniel Brito
	C	(England) ENG	Philip Wait
	C	(Germany) GER	Joshua Lockett
	G	(England) ENG	Matthew Allerston

=== Notable former players ===
- (United Kingdom) David Aliu
- (United Kingdom) Olu Babalola
- (United Kingdom) Devan Bailey
- (United States) Marcus Bailey
- (United States) (United Kingdom) Calvin Davis
- (United States) (United Kingdom) Tony Dorsey
- (France) Rudy Etilopy
- (United States) (Germany) Chuck Evans
- (United States) Josh Gross
- (United Kingdom) Craig Hopkins
- (United Kingdom) Chris Haslam
- (United Kingdom) Delme Herriman
- (United Kingdom) James Jones
- (United Kingdom) Dzaflo Larkai
- (United Kingdom) Perry Lawson
- (United Kingdom) Richard Midgley
- (Senegal) Mohamed Niang
- (United States) (Netherlands) Matthew Otten
- (United States) (United Kingdom) Nate Reinking
- (United Kingdom) John Simpson
- (United States) Andre Smith
- (United Kingdom) Drew Sullivan
- (United Kingdom) Andrew Thomson
- (United States) (United Kingdom) Tafari Toney

== See also ==
- British Basketball League
- Everton F.C.
