= Lijah Perkins =

British basketball player (born 1977)

Lijah Perkins (born 22 January 1977) in Birmingham, United Kingdom is a professional basketball player, currently signed to Worthing Thunder, playing as a Power forward or Centre.

== Biography ==
Known as somewhat of a journeyman in British basketball, Perkins started his career playing for his hometown team Birmingham Bullets in 1995, making his professional debut against the Sheffield Sharks on 9 September 1995. He has since then gone on to play for no fewer than 7 British teams and over 9 European teams in his career as well as earn 6 appearances for the England national team.

Perkins enjoyed most of his success with the famous Bullets team of the mid-nineties. In 1996 he picked up his first award as BBL Play-off winner, helping the Bullets to defeat London Towers 78-72 in front of a packed Wembley Arena crowd. Perkins and the Bullets were to regain the Play-off title two years later in 1998 with a close 78-75 victory over Thames Valley Tigers, capping off another successful season where the team finished as Runners-up in the League Championship. Perkins left the UK that year to pursue dreams of a career in Europe, finding himself in the Icelandic league where he was the league leader of Blocked Shots for 1998–1999.

After stints at several other European clubs, the Small/Power forward returned home to sign for National Basketball League side Teesside Mohawks, one of the frontrunners of the lower leagues. Success returned again for Perkins, and inside his first season with the club he had already won the National Trophy, Conference Championship and Play-off final with an incredible double-overtime 127-117 victory against Solent Stars.

Though his time at the Mohawks was a resounding success, Perkins soon moved on during the following season and returned to Europe and Finland where his achievements continued. Playing for Forssan Koripojat, he helped the team to second-place in the First Division finishing with impressive stats 19 points and 11 rebounds per-game, and picking up both the league's award for Player of the Year, Forward of the Year and Bosman of the Year. He was named in the All-Star 1st Team & All-Bosman Team for the 2004-05 Season.

His stats caught the attention of Brighton Bears coach Nick Nurse who promptly signed up Perkins, leading the way for another return home and back into the BBL. His stint did not last long however and he was soon transferred to London Towers, where within a few months of being at the club, he helped the team to the Final of the 2006 BBL Cup, eventually losing to Newcastle Eagles, 83-69.

Following the closure of the Towers that summer, Perkins was again on the lookout for a team and moved on to the Scottish Rocks for a brief period before travelling through Switzerland, Spain and France and eventually ending up back in London under the command of Steve Bucknall at BBL rookies London Capital, where he signed on a temporary basis. After the end of a shambolic first season for London, Perkins opted to sign for another rookie team Worthing Thunder, who had just joined the BBL from the English Basketball League. After retiring from the game of basketball in November 2008, Perkins has decided to revitalise his career and get back to playing and has journeyed back to Europe to France once again.

He is now head of year 11 at Four Dwellings academy, Quinton, birmingham (B32 1RJ).

== Playing history ==
- 2010–2011 (France) Caen Basket Calvados
- 2008 (United Kingdom) Worthing Thunder
- 2007–2008 (United Kingdom) London Capital
- 2007 (France) Etoile d'Or St-Leonard
- 2006–2007 (Spain) Grupo Salmerón Guadix
- 2006 (Switzerland) Union Neuchâtel
- 2006 (United Kingdom) Scottish Rocks
- 2005–2006 (United Kingdom) London Towers
- 2005 (United Kingdom) Brighton Bears
- 2004–2005 (Finland) Forssan Koripojat
- 2003–2004 (Spain) Coruna
- 2001–2003 (United Kingdom) Teesside Mohawks
- 2001 (Netherlands) Werkendam
- 2000–2001 (Belgium) Hasselt
- 1999–2000 (Iceland) KR Basket
- 1998–1999 (Iceland) Thorlakshofn
- 1995–1998 (United Kingdom) Birmingham Bullets
