= Chris Haslam =

Chris Haslam may refer to:

- Chris Haslam (basketball) (born 1974), British former basketball player
- Chris Haslam (skateboarder) (born 1980), Canadian skateboarder
