= Darius Defoe =

British basketball player

No. 13 – Newcastle Eagles
- Position: Power forward / centre
- League: Super League Basketball

Personal information
- Born: 14 November 1984 (age 42) Bataka, Dominica
- Listed height: 2.04 m (6 ft 8 in)
- Listed weight: 100.7 kg (222 lb)

Career information
- College: Hackney Community College
- Playing career: 2004–2026

Career history
- 2005–2026: Newcastle Eagles

Darius Defoe (born 14 November 1984) is a retired British basketball player. Defoe is a 6 ft 8 in (2.03 m) power forward, who is able to play in the centre. From September 2005 until his retirement from playing in May 2026, Defoe was a member of the Newcastle Eagles.

== Early years ==
Defoe attended St. David & St. Katharine School (now known as Greig City Academy) in Haringey, north London and is a graduate of the Hackney Community College Basketball Academy Programme. He currently plays for the Newcastle Eagles in the British Basketball League. Defoe has played with the Eagles since the 2004-2005 Season.

== Professional career ==
=== Newcastle Eagles ===
As at 20 March 2011 the official British Basketball League website shows that Defoe has made 217 appearances for Newcastle Eagles and has an 8.81 Points Per Game Average, a 5.24 Rebounds Per Game Average and a 0.62 Assists Per Game Average.

=== 2004-2005 ===
Defoe joined Newcastle Eagles in 2004 from Hackney White Heat. He made his debut on 1 October 2004 against the Scottish Rocks. In his debut season of Professional Basketball, Defoe played 40 games, playing 521 minutes, while recording averages of 4.80 Points Per Game and 3.33 Rebounds Per Game. In this season Defoe picked up a BBL Trophy winners medal and a British Basketball League Play-Off winners medal.

=== 2005-2006 ===
In the 2005-06 Season, Defoe made 32 appearances, bettering his averages with 8.34 Points Per Game, and 4.78 Rebounds Per Game, while putting in some impressive performances for the team in their Trophy "Clean Sweep" of BBL Cup, BBL Trophy, British Basketball League Championship, and British Basketball League Play-Offs.

=== 2006-2007 ===
In the 2006-07 Season Defoe made 36 appearances with averages of 7.36 Points Per Game and 5.81 Rebounds Per Game. In this season Defoe picked up his third British Basketball League Play-Offs winner medal.

Defoe was also a winner of the 2006 Nike Midnight Madness Trophy.

=== 2007-2008 ===
In the 2007-08 Season Defoe made 33 appearances with averages of 9.52 Points Per Game and 5.09 Rebounds Per Game. In this season Defoe picked up his second British Basketball League Championship winner medal.

Defoe was also a winner of the 2007 Nike Midnight Madness Trophy. In the summer of 2007 he played as part of the British team called Midnight Madness which competed and won against an American team in Chicago.

=== 2008-2009 ===
In the 2008-09 Season Defoe made 31 appearances with averages of 10.71 Points Per Game and 6.13 Rebounds Per Game. In this season Defoe picked up his third British Basketball League Championship winner medal, his third BBL Trophy winner medal and his fourth British Basketball League Play-Offs winner medal.

=== 2009-2010 ===
In the 2009-10 Season Defoe made 35 appearances with averages of 11.94 Points Per Game and 6.34 Rebounds Per Game. Statistically this was Defoe's best season to date. In this season Defoe picked up his fourth British Basketball League Championship winner medal and his fourth BBL Trophy winner medal.

=== 2010-2011 ===
In the 2010-011 Season after 10 appearances Defoe had averaged 12.3 Points Per Game and 6.2 Rebounds Per Game.

== Honours and awards ==
- 2 Great Britain Caps
- 4-Time British Basketball League Championship Winner
- 1-Time British Basketball League Championship Runner Up
- 4-Time British Basketball League Play-Off Winner
- 1-Time British Basketball League Cup Winner
- 1-Time British Basketball League Cup Runner Up
- 4-Time British Basketball Trophy Winner
- 2-Time British Basketball Trophy Runner Up
