= Richard Midgley =

British basketball player

Career information
- Playing career: 2006–2009

Career history
- 2007–2008: Newcastle Eagles

Richard Midgley (born 7 July 1983 in Burgess Hill, England) is a retired British professional basketball player who finished his career at the age of 26. He played point guard and played for Great Britain. His final club was Everton Tigers of the British Basketball League; he previously played for Newcastle Eagles after graduating from the University of California, and subsequently became a high-school basketball coach.

== Early career ==
The 6'3" Midgley began his career with his local club team, Haywards Heath Eagles, also played for the junior teams of the powerhouse club London Towers, and served as captain of the England Youth National team.

In 1999 he moved to Modesto, California, where he played two seasons at Modesto Christian High School. He was ruled ineligible to compete in his senior year on grounds of age.

== College career ==
In 2002 Midgley entered the University of California, where he starred for the Cal Bears; he was named to the Pac-10 All-Freshman team and set a Cal freshman record by connecting on 44.9 per cent of his three-point attempts (44–98) as he started the Bears' final 22 games of the season. His best moment of the season came in the first-round game of the NCAA tournament against North Carolina State, when he sank a game-winning three-pointer with 3.9 seconds left in the overtime to give the eight-seeded Cal Bears a dramatic 76–74 win.

In the 2004–05 season, after a slow start he averaged 12.9 points in 26 games during the Pac-10 season, with a field-goal percentage of 38.6%.

Midgley played his senior year at Cal averaging 8.6 points in 30 games, in a season where the Bears advanced to the championship game of the 2006 Pac-10 Conference tournament, only to fall 72–51 to the eventual national runner-up UCLA. Midgley played alongside Leon Powe, tournament MVP and draftee to NBA franchise Boston Celtics.

== Professional career ==
In 2006 Midgley was recruited out of Cal to Spanish LEB1 side Tenerife, but suffered from tendinitis of the knee, which hampered his progress at the club. He was released before playing a game.

After a season of rehab he joined the Great Britain squad in July 2007. The following month, upon the recommendation of teammate Drew Sullivan, Midgley signed for Newcastle Eagles. He was officially released from his contract on 13 December 2007, and signed for league rivals Everton Tigers a couple of days later. He led the team to the BBL Trophy but retired after the 2008–09 season and returned to the United States.

== Coaching ==
In 2010 Midgley became an assistant coach at Modesto Christian; in 2014 he became head basketball coach. He left in 2016 to become a scout for the Atlanta Hawks.
