= Basketball at the 2012 Summer Olympics – Men's team rosters =

This is a list of players named to participate in the men's basketball competition at the Games of the XXX Olympiad.

== Group A ==
=== Argentina ===
The following is the Argentina roster in the men's basketball tournament of the 2012 Summer Olympics.

Argentina men's national basketball team – 2012 Summer Olympics roster
Players
Coaches

Pos.	No.	Name	Age – Date of birth	Height	Club
F	4	Luis Scola	32 – 30 April 1980	2.07 m (6 ft 9 in)	Phoenix Suns
G	5	Manu Ginóbili	35 – 28 July 1977	1.98 m (6 ft 6 in)	San Antonio Spurs
F	6	Marcos Mata	25 – 1 August 1986	2.01 m (6 ft 7 in)	Peñarol de Mar del Plata
G	7	Facundo Campazzo	21 – 23 March 1991	1.79 m (5 ft 10 in)	Peñarol de Mar del Plata
G	8	Pablo Prigioni	35 – 17 May 1977	1.91 m (6 ft 3 in)	New York Knicks
C	9	Juan Pedro Gutiérrez	28 – 10 October 1983	2.05 m (6 ft 9 in)	Obras Sanitarias
G	10	Carlos Delfino	29 – 29 August 1982	2.00 m (6 ft 7 in)	Milwaukee Bucks
C	11	Martín Leiva	32 – 23 April 1980	2.10 m (6 ft 11 in)	Peñarol de Mar del Plata
F	12	Leonardo Gutiérrez	34 – 16 May 1978	2.01 m (6 ft 7 in)	Peñarol de Mar del Plata
F	13	Andrés Nocioni	32 – 30 November 1979	2.01 m (6 ft 7 in)	Caja Laboral
F	14	Hernán Jasen	34 – 4 February 1978	1.99 m (6 ft 6 in)	CB Sevilla
F	15	Federico Kammerichs	32 – 21 June 1980	2.02 m (6 ft 8 in)	Regatas Corrientes

Head coach

- Julio Lamas

Legend

- Club – describes last
  club before the tournament
- Age – describes age
  on 29 July 2012

=== France ===
The following is the France roster in the men's basketball tournament of the 2012 Summer Olympics.

France men's national basketball team – 2012 Summer Olympics roster
Players
Coaches

Pos.	No.	Name	Age – Date of birth	Height	Club
C	4	Kevin Séraphin	22 – 7 December 1989	2.06 m (6 ft 9 in)	Washington Wizards
F	5	Nicolas Batum	23 – 14 December 1988	2.03 m (6 ft 8 in)	Portland Trail Blazers
G	6	Fabien Causeur	25 – 16 June 1987	1.93 m (6 ft 4 in)	Caja Laboral
F	7	Yakhouba Diawara	29 – 29 August 1982	2.01 m (6 ft 7 in)	Pallacanestro Varese
F/C	8	Ali Traoré	27 – 28 February 1985	2.08 m (6 ft 10 in)	BC Lokomotiv–Kuban Krasnodar
G	9	Tony Parker	30 – 17 May 1982	1.88 m (6 ft 2 in)	San Antonio Spurs
G	10	Yannick Bokolo	27 – 19 June 1985	1.88 m (6 ft 2 in)	BCM Gravelines
F	11	Florent Piétrus	31 – 19 January 1981	2.02 m (6 ft 8 in)	Valencia BC
G	12	Nando de Colo	25 – 23 June 1987	1.96 m (6 ft 5 in)	San Antonio Spurs
F	13	Boris Diaw	30 – 16 April 1982	2.03 m (6 ft 8 in)	San Antonio Spurs
C	14	Ronny Turiaf	31 – 18 June 1981	2.08 m (6 ft 10 in)	Los Angeles Clippers
F	15	Mickaël Gelabale	29 – 22 May 1983	2.01 m (6 ft 7 in)	BC Khimki

Head coach

- Vincent Collet

Legend

- Club – describes last
  club before the tournament
- Age – describes age
  on 29 July 2012

=== Lithuania ===
The following is the Lithuania roster in the men's basketball tournament of the 2012 Summer Olympics.

Lithuania men's national basketball team – 2012 Summer Olympics roster
Players
Coaches

Pos.	No.	Name	Age – Date of birth	Height	Club
G	4	Rimantas Kaukėnas	35 – 11 April 1977	1.94 m (6 ft 4 in)	Mens Sana Basket
G	5	Mantas Kalnietis	25 – 6 September 1986	1.96 m (6 ft 5 in)	BC Žalgiris
F	6	Jonas Mačiulis	27 – 10 February 1985	1.98 m (6 ft 6 in)	Mens Sana Basket
G	7	Martynas Pocius	26 – 28 April 1986	1.96 m (6 ft 5 in)	Real Madrid Baloncesto
G	8	Renaldas Seibutis	27 – 23 July 1985	1.98 m (6 ft 6 in)	BC Lietuvos rytas
F	9	Darius Songaila	34 – 14 February 1978	2.06 m (6 ft 9 in)	CB Valladolid
G	10	Simas Jasaitis	30 – 26 March 1982	2.01 m (6 ft 7 in)	Türk Telekom B.K.
F	11	Linas Kleiza (C)	27 – 3 January 1985	2.03 m (6 ft 8 in)	Toronto Raptors
C	12	Antanas Kavaliauskas	27 – 19 September 1984	2.09 m (6 ft 10 in)	BK VEF Rīga
G	13	Šarūnas Jasikevičius	36 – 5 March 1976	1.93 m (6 ft 4 in)	Panathinaikos B.C.
C	14	Jonas Valančiūnas	20 – 6 May 1992	2.11 m (6 ft 11 in)	BC Lietuvos rytas
F	15	Paulius Jankūnas	28 – 29 April 1984	2.06 m (6 ft 9 in)	BC Žalgiris

Head coach

- Kęstutis Kemzūra

Assistant coach(es)

- Valdemaras Chomičius
- Robertas Kuncaitis
- Donaldas Kairys

Team manager

- Antanas Guoga

Legend

- Club – describes last
  club before the tournament
- Age – describes age
  on 29 July 2012
- (C) – team captain

=== Nigeria ===
The following is the Nigeria roster in the men's basketball tournament of the 2012 Summer Olympics.

Nigeria men's national basketball team – 2012 Summer Olympics roster
Players
Coaches

Pos.	No.	Name	Age – Date of birth	Height	Club
G	4	Tony Skinn	29 – February 8, 1983	6 ft 3 in (1.91 m)	Ironi Ashkelon
F	5	Ekene Ibekwe	27 – July 19, 1985	6 ft 11 in (2.11 m)	BBC Bayreuth
F	6	Ike Diogu	28 – September 11, 1983	6 ft 10 in (2.08 m)	Capitanes de Arecibo
F	7	Al-Farouq Aminu	21 – September 21, 1990	6 ft 9 in (2.06 m)	New Orleans Hornets
G	8	Ade Dagunduro	26 – May 22, 1986	6 ft 5 in (1.96 m)	Stella Artois Leuven Bears
G	9	Chamberlain Oguchi	26 – April 28, 1986	6 ft 6 in (1.98 m)	Panteras de Miranda
F	10	Koko Archibong	30 – October 5, 1981	6 ft 9 in (2.06 m)	LTi Giessen 46ers
G	11	Richard Oruche	24 – August 30, 1987	6 ft 4 in (1.93 m)	Académica Coimbra
F	12	Ejike Ugboaja	27 – May 28, 1985	6 ft 9 in (2.06 m)	Jahesh Tarabar Qom
G	13	Derrick Obasohan	31 – April 18, 1981	6 ft 6 in (1.98 m)	Joventut Badalona
C	14	Alade Aminu	24 – September 14, 1987	6 ft 11 in (2.11 m)	Élan Chalon
C	15	Olumide Oyedeji	31 – May 11, 1981	6 ft 11 in (2.11 m)	Qingdao Double Star

Head coach

- Ayo Bakare

Legend

- Club – describes last
  club before the tournament
- Age – describes age
  on 29 July 2012

=== Tunisia ===
The following is the Tunisia roster in the men's basketball tournament of the 2012 Summer Olympics.

Tunisia men's national basketball team – 2012 Summer Olympics roster
Players
Coaches

Pos.	No.	Name	Age – Date of birth	Height	Club
F	4	Radhouane Slimane	31 – 16 August 1980	2.05 m (6 ft 9 in)	Al Nasr Dubai
G	5	Marouan Laghnej	26 – 22 April 1986	1.92 m (6 ft 4 in)	JS Kairouan
G	6	Nizar Knioua	29 – 8 June 1983	1.88 m (6 ft 2 in)	Stade Nabeulien
G	7	Mourad El Mabrouk	25 – 19 October 1986	1.85 m (6 ft 1 in)	Ezzahra Sport Rades
G	8	Marouan Kechrid	31 – 2 June 1981	1.78 m (5 ft 10 in)	US Monastir
F	9	Mohamed Hdidane	26 – 27 April 1986	2.05 m (6 ft 9 in)	Stade Nabeulien
F	10	Mehdi Hafsi	34 – 23 February 1978	2.03 m (6 ft 8 in)	ESSM Le Portel
C	11	Mokhtar Ghyaza	25 – 15 November 1986	2.04 m (6 ft 8 in)	Ezzahra Sport Rades
F	12	Makrem Ben Romdhane	23 – 27 March 1989	2.04 m (6 ft 8 in)	Étoile Sportive du Sahel
F	13	Amine Rzig	31 – 25 August 1980	1.98 m (6 ft 6 in)	Étoile Sportive du Sahel
F	14	Youssef Gaddour	22 – 15 March 1990	2.03 m (6 ft 8 in)	US Monastir
C	15	Salah Mejri	26 – 15 June 1986	2.17 m (7 ft 1 in)	Étoile Sportive du Sahel

Head coach

- Adel Tlatli

Legend

- Club – describes last
  club before the tournament
- Age – describes age
  on 29 July 2012

=== United States ===
The following is the United States roster in the men's basketball tournament of the 2012 Summer Olympics.

United States men's national basketball team – 2012 Summer Olympics roster
Players
Coaches

Pos.	No.	Name	Age – Date of birth	Height	Club
C	4	Tyson Chandler	29 – October 2, 1982	7 ft 1 in (2.16 m)	New York Knicks
F	5	Kevin Durant	23 – September 29, 1988	6 ft 10 in (2.08 m)	Oklahoma City Thunder
F	6	LeBron James	27 – December 30, 1984	6 ft 8 in (2.03 m)	Miami Heat
G	7	Russell Westbrook	23 – November 12, 1988	6 ft 3 in (1.91 m)	Oklahoma City Thunder
G	8	Deron Williams	28 – June 26, 1984	6 ft 3 in (1.91 m)	Brooklyn Nets
F	9	Andre Iguodala	28 – January 28, 1984	6 ft 6 in (1.98 m)	Philadelphia 76ers
G	10	Kobe Bryant	33 – August 23, 1978	6 ft 6 in (1.98 m)	Los Angeles Lakers
F	11	Kevin Love	23 – September 7, 1988	6 ft 9 in (2.06 m)	Minnesota Timberwolves
G	12	James Harden	22 – August 26, 1989	6 ft 5 in (1.96 m)	Oklahoma City Thunder
G	13	Chris Paul	27 – May 6, 1985	6 ft 0 in (1.83 m)	Los Angeles Clippers
C	14	Anthony Davis	19 – March 11, 1993	6 ft 10 in (2.08 m)	Kentucky Wildcats
F	15	Carmelo Anthony	28 – May 29, 1984	6 ft 7 in (2.01 m)	New York Knicks

Head coach

- Mike Krzyzewski

Assistant coach(es)

- Jim Boeheim
- Mike D'Antoni
- Nate McMillan
- Jerry Colangelo (executive director)

Legend

- Club – describes last
  club before the tournament
- Age – describes age
  on 29 July 2012

== Group B ==
=== Australia ===
The following is the Australia roster in the men's basketball tournament of the 2012 Summer Olympics.

Australia men's national basketball team – 2012 Summer Olympics roster
Players
Coaches

Pos.	No.	Name	Age – Date of birth	Height	Club
SG	4	Peter Crawford	32 – 6 November 1979	1.93 m (6 ft 4 in)	Townsville Crocodiles
PG	5	Patty Mills	23 – 11 August 1988	1.83 m (6 ft 0 in)	San Antonio Spurs
PG	6	Adam Gibson	25 – 30 October 1986	1.88 m (6 ft 2 in)	Adelaide 36ers
SF	7	Joe Ingles	24 – 2 October 1987	2.03 m (6 ft 8 in)	FC Barcelona Bàsquet
G/F	8	Brad Newley	27 – 18 February 1985	1.99 m (6 ft 6 in)	CB Gran Canaria
SG	9	Matthew Dellavedova	21 – 8 September 1990	1.93 m (6 ft 4 in)	Saint Mary's Gaels
SF	10	David Barlow	28 – 22 October 1983	2.05 m (6 ft 9 in)	CB Murcia
PF	11	Mark Worthington	29 – 8 June 1983	2.02 m (6 ft 8 in)	Radnički Kragujevac
F/C	12	Aron Baynes	25 – 9 December 1986	2.08 m (6 ft 10 in)	Ikaros Kallitheas B.C.
C	13	David Andersen	32 – 23 June 1980	2.12 m (6 ft 11 in)	Fenerbahçe Ülker
PF	14	Matthew Nielsen (C)	34 – 3 February 1978	2.08 m (6 ft 10 in)	BC Khimki
C	15	Aleks Marić	27 – 22 October 1984	2.11 m (6 ft 11 in)	PBC Lokomotiv-Kuban

Head coach

- Brett Brown

Assistant coach(es)

- Andrej Lemanis
- Marty Clarke

Legend

- Club – describes last
  club before the tournament
- Age – describes age
  on 29 July 2012

=== Brazil ===
The following is the Brazil roster in the men's basketball tournament of the 2012 Summer Olympics.

Brazil men's national basketball team – 2012 Summer Olympics roster
Players
Coaches

Pos.	No.	Name	Age – Date of birth	Height	Club
G/F	4	Marcelo Machado	37 – 12 April 1975	2.01 m (6 ft 7 in)	CR Flamengo
PG	5	Raul Togni Neto	20 – 19 May 1992	1.85 m (6 ft 1 in)	Lagun Aro GBC
C	6	Caio Torres	25 – 3 June 1987	2.11 m (6 ft 11 in)	CR Flamengo
PG	7	Larry Taylor	31 – 31 October 1980	1.85 m (6 ft 1 in)	Bauru Basketball
G/F	8	Alex Garcia	32 – 4 March 1980	1.91 m (6 ft 3 in)	UniCEUB/BRB
PG	9	Marcelinho Huertas	29 – 25 May 1983	1.91 m (6 ft 3 in)	FC Barcelona Bàsquet
SG	10	Leandro Barbosa	29 – 28 November 1982	1.91 m (6 ft 3 in)	Indiana Pacers
F/C	11	Anderson Varejão	29 – 28 September 1982	2.11 m (6 ft 11 in)	Cleveland Cavaliers
F	12	Guilherme Giovannoni	32 – 2 June 1980	2.04 m (6 ft 8 in)	UniCEUB/BRB
F/C	13	Nenê Hilário	29 – 13 September 1982	2.11 m (6 ft 11 in)	Washington Wizards
F	14	Marcus Vinicius de Souza	28 – 31 May 1984	2.08 m (6 ft 10 in)	CR Flamengo
C	15	Tiago Splitter	27 – 1 January 1985	2.11 m (6 ft 11 in)	San Antonio Spurs

Head coach

- Rubén Magnano

Assistant coach(es)

- Fernando Duró
- José Alves Neto
- Demétrius Conrado Ferraciú

Legend

- Club – describes last
  club before the tournament
- Age – describes age
  on 29 July 2012

=== China ===
The following is the China roster in the men's basketball tournament of the 2012 Summer Olympics.

China men's national basketball team – 2012 Summer Olympics roster
Players
Coaches

Pos.	No.	Name	Age – Date of birth	Height	Club
PF	4	Ding Jinhui	22 – 27 October 1989	2.04 m (6 ft 8 in)	Zhejiang Golden Bulls
PG	5	Liu Wei (C)	32 – 15 January 1980	1.90 m (6 ft 3 in)	Shanghai Sharks
SF	6	Yi Li	26 – 7 November 1985	2.03 m (6 ft 8 in)	Jiangsu Dragons
SG	7	Wang Shipeng	29 – 6 April 1983	1.96 m (6 ft 5 in)	Guangdong Southern Tigers
SF	8	Zhu Fangyu	29 – 5 January 1983	2.01 m (6 ft 7 in)	Guangdong Southern Tigers
SG	9	Sun Yue	26 – 6 November 1985	2.05 m (6 ft 9 in)	Beijing Olympians
C	10	Zhang Zhaoxu	24 – 18 November 1987	2.21 m (7 ft 3 in)	Shanghai Sharks
PF	11	Yi Jianlian	24 – 27 October 1987	2.12 m (6 ft 11 in)	Dallas Mavericks
PG	12	Guo Ailun	18 – 14 November 1993	1.92 m (6 ft 4 in)	Liaoning Dinosaurs
PG	13	Chen Jianghua	23 – 12 March 1989	1.88 m (6 ft 2 in)	Guangdong Southern Tigers
C	14	Wang Zhizhi	35 – 8 July 1977	2.14 m (7 ft 0 in)	Bayi Rockets
SF	15	Zhou Peng	22 – 11 October 1989	2.06 m (6 ft 9 in)	Guangdong Southern Tigers

Head coach

- Bob Donewald

Assistant coach(es)

- Li Nan
- Peter Philo

Legend

- Club – describes last
  club before the tournament
- Age – describes age
  on 29 July 2012

=== Great Britain ===
The following is the Great Britain roster in the men's basketball tournament of the 2012 Summer Olympics.

Great Britain men's national basketball team – 2012 Summer Olympics roster
Players
Coaches

Pos.	No.	Name	Age – Date of birth	Height	Club
PF	4	Kieron Achara	29 – 3 July 1983	2.08 m (6 ft 10 in)	Assignia Manresa
PG	5	Andrew Lawrence	22 – 4 June 1990	1.85 m (6 ft 1 in)	Charleston Cougars
SG	6	Mike Lenzly	31 – 1 May 1981	1.89 m (6 ft 2 in)	ČEZ Nymburk
F/C	7	Pops Mensah-Bonsu	28 – 7 September 1983	2.06 m (6 ft 9 in)	Beşiktaş Milangaz
SF	8	Andrew Sullivan	31 – 12 February 1980	2.03 m (6 ft 8 in)	Leicester Riders
SF	9	Luol Deng	27 – 16 April 1985	2.06 m (6 ft 9 in)	Chicago Bulls
C	10	Robert Archibald	32 – 29 March 1980	2.11 m (6 ft 11 in)	CAI Zaragoza
PF	11	Joel Freeland	25 – 7 February 1987	2.08 m (6 ft 10 in)	Portland Trail Blazers
PG	12	Nate Reinking	38 – 12 December 1973	1.88 m (6 ft 2 in)	Sheffield Sharks
PF	13	Daniel Clark	23 – 16 September 1988	2.10 m (6 ft 11 in)	CB Estudiantes
SG	14	Kyle Johnson	23 – 31 December 1988	1.95 m (6 ft 5 in)	APOEL B.C.
C	15	Eric Boateng	26 – 20 November 1985	2.08 m (6 ft 10 in)	Peristeri B.C.

Head coach

- Chris Finch

Assistant coach(es)

- Paul Mokeski
- Nick Nurse

Legend
- Club is latest as prior to tournament.
- Age is as at 29 July 2012.

=== Russia ===
The following is the Russia roster in the men's basketball tournament of the 2012 Summer Olympics.

Russia men's national basketball team – 2012 Summer Olympics roster
Players
Coaches

Pos.	No.	Name	Age – Date of birth	Height	Club
G	4	Alexey Shved	23 – 16 December 1988	1.98 m (6 ft 6 in)	Minnesota Timberwolves
C	5	Timofey Mozgov	26 – 16 July 1986	2.15 m (7 ft 1 in)	Denver Nuggets
G	6	Sergey Karasev	18 – 26 October 1993	2.00 m (6 ft 7 in)	BC Triumph Lyubertsy
G	7	Vitaly Fridzon	26 – 14 October 1985	1.96 m (6 ft 5 in)	BC Khimki
C	8	Alexander Kaun	27 – 8 May 1985	2.11 m (6 ft 11 in)	PBC CSKA Moscow
G	9	Evgeny Voronov	26 – 7 May 1986	1.96 m (6 ft 5 in)	PBC CSKA Moscow
F	10	Victor Khryapa	29 – 3 August 1982	2.06 m (6 ft 9 in)	PBC CSKA Moscow
F	11	Semyon Antonov	23 – 18 July 1989	2.02 m (6 ft 8 in)	BC Nizhny Novgorod
F	12	Sergei Monia	29 – 15 April 1983	2.03 m (6 ft 8 in)	BC Khimki
G	13	Dmitri Khvostov	22 – 21 August 1989	1.90 m (6 ft 3 in)	BC Khimki
G	14	Anton Ponkrashov	26 – 23 April 1986	2.02 m (6 ft 8 in)	PBC CSKA Moscow
F	15	Andrei Kirilenko	31 – 18 February 1981	2.07 m (6 ft 9 in)	Minnesota Timberwolves

Head coach

- David Blatt

Legend

- Club – describes last
  club before the tournament
- Age – describes age
  on 29 July 2012

=== Spain ===
The following is the Spain roster in the men's basketball tournament of the 2012 Summer Olympics.

Spain men's national basketball team – 2012 Summer Olympics roster
Players
Coaches

Pos.	No.	Name	Age – Date of birth	Height	Club
PF	4	Pau Gasol	32 – 6 July 1980	2.13 m (7 ft 0 in)	Los Angeles Lakers
SF	5	Rudy Fernández	27 – 4 April 1985	1.98 m (6 ft 6 in)	Real Madrid Baloncesto
PG	6	Sergio Rodríguez	26 – 12 June 1986	1.92 m (6 ft 4 in)	Real Madrid Baloncesto
SG	7	Juan Carlos Navarro (C)	32 – 13 June 1980	1.92 m (6 ft 4 in)	FC Barcelona Bàsquet
PG	8	José Calderón	30 – 28 September 1981	1.92 m (6 ft 4 in)	Toronto Raptors
C	9	Felipe Reyes	32 – 16 March 1980	2.06 m (6 ft 9 in)	Real Madrid Baloncesto
SF	10	Víctor Claver	23 – 30 August 1988	2.07 m (6 ft 9 in)	Portland Trail Blazers
SF	11	Fernando San Emeterio	28 – 1 January 1984	1.99 m (6 ft 6 in)	Caja Laboral Baskonia
SG	12	Sergio Llull	24 – 15 November 1987	1.92 m (6 ft 4 in)	Real Madrid Baloncesto
C	13	Marc Gasol	27 – 29 January 1985	2.16 m (7 ft 1 in)	Memphis Grizzlies
PF	14	Serge Ibaka	23 – 18 July 1989	2.08 m (6 ft 10 in)	Oklahoma City Thunder
PG	15	Víctor Sada	28 – 8 March 1984	1.92 m (6 ft 4 in)	FC Barcelona Bàsquet

Head coach

- Sergio Scariolo

Assistant coach(es)

- Juan Antonio Orenga
- Quim Costa

Legend

- Club – describes last
  club before the tournament
- Age – describes age
  on 29 July 2012
