= John Simpson (basketball) =

English basketball player

John Simpson is a British former professional basketball player. He was one of the original members of the Everton Tigers in the British Basketball League. Before joining the Tigers, he played for the Cheshire Jets. He left the Tigers in October 2008 for personal reasons.
