= Jeff Danchie =

English basketball player

Jeff Danchie (born 19 April 1984 in Ghana) is an English professional basketball player, and currently plays for the London Mets in the English Basketball League's first division. Previously, Jeff played was a reserve player for the Plymouth Raiders in the British Basketball League.

The 5ft10 Guard attended the UK's student basketball powerhouse, Marjon's College, whilst also playing with the Plymouth Raiders from 2004, having been signed from Hackney White Heat.

Daniche holds dual British and Ghanaian citizenship. He is a graduate of the Hackney Community College Basketball Academy Programme and received an AoC Gold Award in 2009.
