= New College London =

Former Congregationalist college

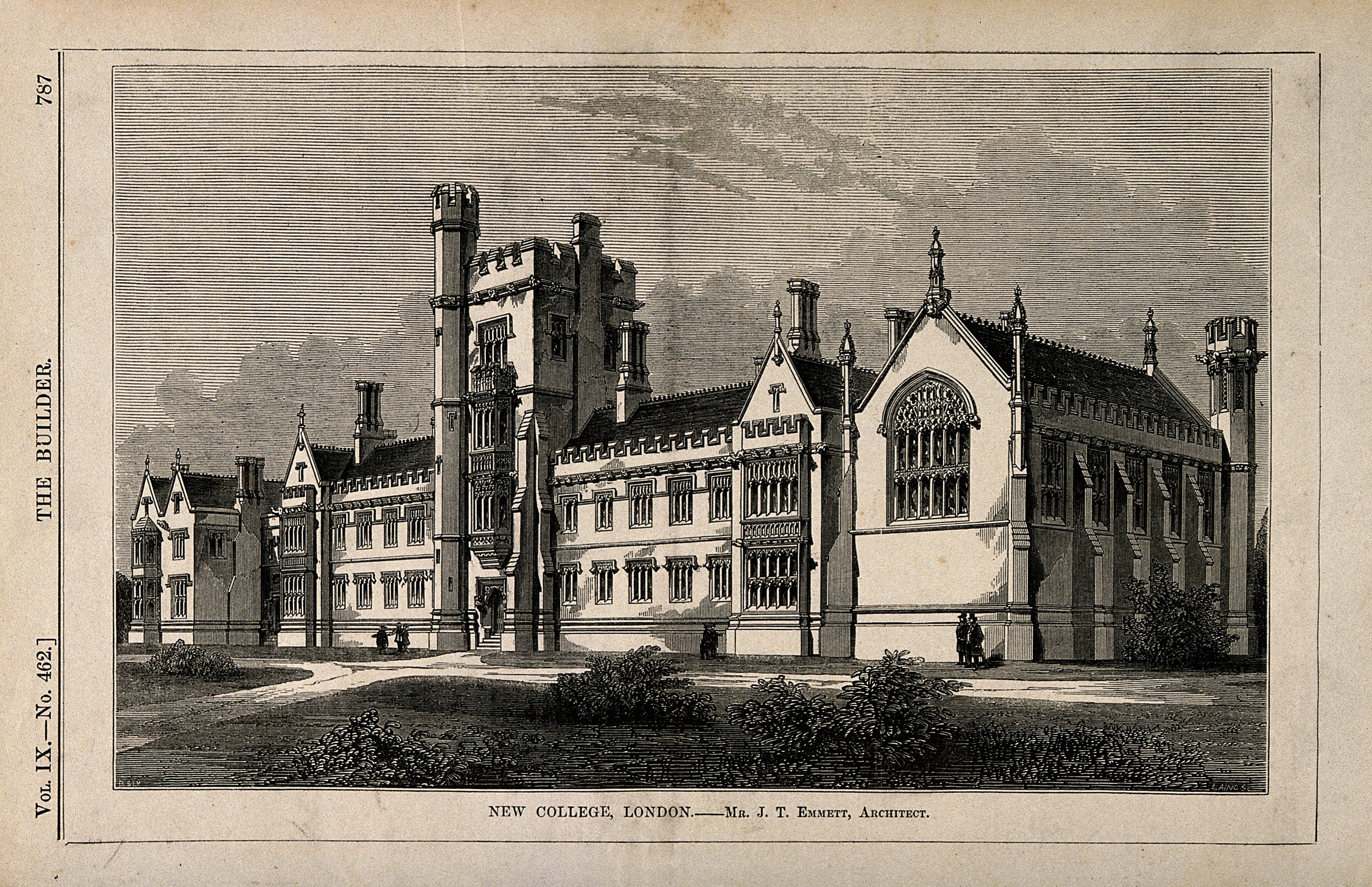
- New College, St John's Wood, London. Wood engraving by C.D. Laing after B. Sly, 1851
- Hampstead; England

Information
- Established: 1850

New College London (1850–1980) (sometimes known as New College, St John's Wood, or New College, Hampstead) was founded as a Congregationalist college in 1850.

== Predecessor institutions ==
New College London came into being in 1850 by the amalgamation of three dissenting academies.

The first was associated with William Coward (died 1738), a London merchant who used his money to train ministers for the "protestant dissenters". The trustees of his will supported, among others, the academy started by Philip Doddridge, taking it over after Doddridge's death in 1751. This establishment, founded at Market Harborough, moved to Northampton, to Daventry, back to Northampton, then to Wymondley, and finally in 1833 to London. Its final home was built by Thomas Cubitt the year before, and was located in Byng Place, Torrington Square, south of the Catholic Apostolic Church in the heart of Bloomsbury, when it was known as Coward College. Two of its principals were the Rev. Thomas Morell and Dr Thomas William Jenkyn. Despite the financial support of Coward, the college is probably best known as the Daventry Academy. Its best-known student was the polymath Joseph Priestley.

The second dissenting academy, which ended up known as Highbury College, started out in Mile End in 1783, moved to Hoxton in 1791, and then to Highbury in 1826. Its most famous student was Christopher Newman Hall.

The third, Homerton College, was split into two. Its theological function became part of New College, whereas the rest of it, refounded as a teacher training college, became Homerton College, Cambridge, part of the University of Cambridge.

These three (Daventry, Highbury, and Homerton) merged as New College London. Its initial programme is laid out in the final chapter of The introductory lectures delivered at the opening of the college: October, 1851.

Meanwhile, the Village Itinerancy Society (1796–1839) was transformed into the Hackney Theological Seminary (1839–1871), which was renamed as Hackney College in 1871. Later this was relocated from its origins in Hackney to a fine new building in Hampstead, and became associated with Peter Taylor Forsyth.

== Merger into the University ==
New College and Hackney College became constituents of the University of London's Faculty of Theology when the faculty was created in 1900. They were united by Act of Parliament in 1924 as Hackney and New College, which was renamed New College, London in 1936.

"New buildings were erected behind the Hackney College premises at Hampstead, and were opened in 1938."

When, in 1972, most English Congregational churches joined the newly formed United Reformed Church (URC), and only a small number remained independent, the New College's work was reorganised. In 1976, its library was donated to Dr Williams's Library. Since 1981, the work of the college has been continued by the New College London Foundation, which trains ministers for the URC and Congregational churches.

After closure in 1977 the New College buildings were leased to the Open University, which assigned its rights to the Paris Chamber of Commerce in 2001, as the campus of ESCP-EAP. The freehold of the buildings were sold to the Paris CofC in 2005 and the funds distributed to the four beneficiaries, the United Reformed Church, the Congregational Federation, The Evangelical Fellowship of Congregational Churches and the Unaffiliated Congregational Churches Charity.

Despite the name the college was never associated with Royal Holloway and Bedford New College, also a constituent college of the University of London.

== Notable people ==
New College has gathered many leading thinkers from the Congregationalist, Calvinist and United Reformed traditions.

- John Harris was its first Principal, succeeded by Robert Halley
- Edwin Lankester was appointed professor of natural sciences in 1850. He held this position until 1872.
- Robert Jermain Thomas was educated at the college 1861–1863.
- Walter Frederic Adeney was educated at the college and was lecturer in Biblical and systematic theology at New College in the 1880s.
- Geoffrey Nuttall, Lecturer in Church History at the college, was elected to membership of the British Academy in 1991.
