= BSix Sixth Form College =

Coordinates: 51.5592°N 0.0569°W

Hackney Sixth Form
- Upper Clapton, London; England

Information
- Former name: BSix Sixth Form College
- Established: 2002
- Department for Education URN: 130418 Tables
- Ofsted: Reports

Hackney Sixth Form (formerly BSix Sixth Form College) is a sixth form college in Upper Clapton, London. Established in September 2002 as BSix, the college merged with New City College in August 2024 and now operates as part of its Hackney campus. The merger transferred BSix’s assets and liabilities to New City College Ltd, dissolving the BSix corporation effective 1 August 2024.

== Merger ==
In March 2024, a consultation was launched proposing the merger of Brooke House Sixth Form College (BSix) with New City College. The consultation concluded in May, and a statutory notice confirmed the dissolution of BSix Corporation effective 1 August 2024. The merger completed with BSix relaunched as the Hackney Sixth Form campus of New City College. After the merger proposed changes to the curriculum, which included no longer offering A Levels, were met with significant local opposition.

== History ==
BSix Brooke House Sixth Form College was opened on the Brooke House school site in September 2002, on a site that was previously part of Hackney College. It was set up by the then Secretary of State for Education, David Blunkett, and formed part of an unrealised plan to build eleven new sixth form colleges in London. BSix was unusual in the sixth form college sector because it offered courses at all levels and across a wide range of subjects, including vocational courses, like hair and beauty, business and art as well as A-Levels. In 2010 it was considered to be one of the top colleges in England for improving the performance of its students.

After an initial surge of enthusiasm, the educational context changed rapidly. Hackney's local education authority, the Learning Trust, introduced a programme to create five City Academies in the borough, all with sixth forms. As a consequence, many other 11-16 schools applied to open their own sixth forms. The growth in student recruitment was not as rapid as the Learning and Skills Council (LSC), the funding body, had anticipated. Although by 2019 it had seen improvements to A and AS level results.

== Students ==
In 2014, around 88% of its pupils came from disadvantaged areas.
