= Devan Bailey =

British basketball player

Beyssac Beaupuy Marmande
- Position: Guard
- League: British Basketball League

Personal information
- Born: 10 May 1989 (age 36) Rochford, England
- Listed height: 1.87 m (6 ft 2 in)
- Listed weight: 89 kg (196 lb)

Career information
- College: Central Connecticut (2009–2011)
- Playing career: 2011–present

Career history
- 2011–2012: Mersey Tigers
- 2012–2013: Manchester Giants
- 2013–2014: Cheshire Phoenix
- 2014–2017: Saint François Basket
- 2017: Maia Basquetebol Clube
- 2017-2018: Cheshire Phoenix
- 2018-present: Beyssac Beaupuy Marmande

Career highlights
- BBL All-Defensive First Team (2018); HASC All Star (2014)

Devan Bailey (born 10 May 1989) is a British basketball player.

== College career ==
Devan played two seasons of college basketball at Central Connecticut State, appearing in a total of 61 games, before leaving after his second year in 2011.

== Professional career ==
After having a trial with Italian Seria A giants Victoria Libertas Pesaro in 2011, Bailey signed his first professional contract with British Basketball League team Mersey Tigers. Throughout the 2011–2012 season, he averaged 9.4 points-per-game in 32 appearances. In 2012, he signed for Manchester Giants where he was reunited with Coach Jeff Jones who trained Bailey during his days in the Manchester Magic junior teams. In 30 games for the Giants, Bailey averaged 8.6 points and 3.5 assists. In 2013, Bailey signed for Cheshire Phoenix.

== International ==
Bailey is part of the Great Britain national basketball team, having earned 13 caps. He represented England at the 2012 event of the 3x3 World Championships in Greece.
