= Walter Frederic Adeney =

English biblical scholar (1849–1920)

The Reverend Walter Frederic Adeney
- Born: 14 March 1849; Ealing, England
- Died: 1 September 1920 (aged 71); Lewes, England

Academic background
- Education: New College London; University College London

Academic work
- Discipline: Biblical studies Church history

Walter Frederic Adeney (14 March 1849 – 1 September 1920) was an English Congregationalist minister, theologian, and biblical scholar. Born in Ealing in 1849, he was educated at New College and University College London. He served as a minister in Acton from 1872 to 1889 and became a lecturer in biblical and systematic theology at New College, London, in 1887. He was promoted to a professorship in New Testament exegesis and church history at New College in 1889, before moving to become Principal of Lancashire Independent College in Manchester in 1903. In addition to the numerous works he wrote on the Bible, for both academic and popular audiences, Adeney was general editor of the Century Bible Commentary, and in 1908 he published an extensive history of Eastern Christianity, The Greek and Eastern Churches. He retired in 1913, and died in Lewes on 1 September 1920.

== Selected works ==
- Adeney, Walter F. (1893). Ezra, Nehemiah, and Esther. London: Hodder and Stoughton.
- ——— (1894). The Theology of the New Testament. London: Hodder and Stoughton.
- ——— (1898). The Construction of the Bible. New York: Thomas Whittaker.
- ———; Bennett, W. H. (1899). A Biblical Introduction. New York: Thomas Whittaker.
- ——— (1899). Women of the New Testament. London: James Nisbett and Co.
- ——— (1901). A Century's Progress in Religious Life and Thought. London: James Clarke.
- ——— (1906). The New Testament Story Retold for Young People. London: Macmillan.
- ——— (1908). The Greek and Eastern Churches . New York: Charles Scribner's Sons – via Wikisource. [scan ]
