= PAWS London Capital =

- League: EBL Division 2 (At time of closing)
- Established: 1998
- Folded: 2013
- History: North West; London Wolverines; 1998-2004; London Capital; 2004-2013
- Arena: Capital City Academy (Capacity: 300)
- Location: London, Greater London
- Team colours: Blue, Orange and White
- Website: www.londoncapital.org (No longer active)
| Home | Away |

London Capital, officially called PAWS London Capital in reference to their partnership with PAWS Foundation, were a basketball team based in London, England. The team competed in the British Basketball League for a three-year period in 2007-2010, but were demoted to the second-tier EBL Division 1 following a review of the team's progress both on and off the court. The team were subsequently relegated to Division 2 at the end of the 2011/2012 season, and were withdrawn from the league in October 2013 for "failing to fulfil National League obligations".

== Franchise history ==
=== Early years ===
The franchise started out as the North West London Wolverines, and were immediately accepted into Division 3 of the National Basketball League in 1998, but only after withdrawals from the originally accepted 12 teams meant that a replacement was required. However, they quickly justified their inclusion, finishing that first season just behind Hull and North London, who were both promoted. In 2000, they finished seventh (out of thirteen), and in the 'clean-sheet' reorganisation of the League they were accepted into Division 2 (though this was still the third-ranked division, after the formation of the Conference), but again only after withdrawals created extra vacancies.

Finishing ninth in 2001, they continued their 'skin of the teeth' progress by gaining promotion to the expanded Division 1 after Birmingham Aces dropped out. The next season was one of consolidation, as they finished ninth, but they continued their steady progression, finishing third (behind Team Bath Romans on countback), and reaching the Championship Final, but just missing out on promotion. That promotion, though, was won in fine style the following year (2004), when they took the newly renamed EBL Division 2 title, though they again fell at the final hurdle in the playoffs.

During that season they had begun to draw together the various stands of the club's development work, and their entry into Division 1 for the 2004/2005 season came under their new name after a partnership was agreed with local community support group PAWS Foundation. Again, the team spent some time consolidating their position after promotion, finishing 9th and 11th in successive years, before the 2006/2007 season saw them rise to 5th in the league, and saw them make the semi-finals in their first Division One playoff appearance.

=== Entry to the BBL ===
On 10 May 2007 it was announced that London Capital would become the latest addition to the British Basketball League's mass-expansion for the 2007-08 season, as the 12th team to line up after the newly formed Birmingham Panthers. The new elite franchise wasted no time in preparing for life in the professional league and on 28 June announced that former Los Angeles Lakers player Steve Bucknall would be coaching the team for their rookie season in the BBL. Following the announcement on 5 September that London United had withdrawn from the upcoming BBL season, London Capital were to be the capital city's sole representative in the top-tier league.

A major coup during pre-season for the fledgling franchise was the acquisition of North Carolina's starting guard Wes Miller, who made his debut with a 49-point haul against Milton Keynes Lions on 22 September 2007, Capital's first game in the top flight. Despite this, Capital as a team recorded an unspectacular start to their rookie campaign, recording three wins in their first 9 games, the first an 84–85 overtime away victory against Sheffield Sharks. In the BBL Cup, Capital delivered a huge blow to Plymouth Raiders, dumping the favourites out in the first round with a 74-83 win in Plymouth, before being knocked out themselves by Milton Keynes, 73-78. During the Christmas period, there were major changes in the team's roster, signing Czech international Jaromir Fohler and American Fred Williams, but losing their star player Miller through retirement. As a result, Capital were knocked out of the BBL Trophy at the group stage, and continued to languish near the foot of the table for most of the season and suffered poor attendance. The season ended with a 9th-place finish and a 12–21 record, finishing above established teams such as Leicester Riders and Cheshire Jets.

Capital's second BBL season proved to be even less fruitful, despite early promise with new coach Malik Jivens securing the signings of experienced Marcus Knight, formerly of Guildford Heat, Darren Mills from Leicester, and Ajou Deng coming later in the season. The season turned out to be a disaster, with the roster seemingly becoming a revolving door and constant changes to the line-up ensured a lack of consistency and a disappointing 2-31 finish in last place in the league, along with early exits in both Cup and Trophy. The team's only two victories were at home to Guildford and Worcester Wolves, the latter effectively ending Wolves’ play-off hopes. The downward spiral for Capital continued in the 2009/2010 season, which saw the team again finish in last place, their final 3-33 record even placing them behind rookie franchise the Essex Pirates.

=== Return to the EBL, and departure ===
On 18 May 2010, it was announced that Capital would be withdrawing from the BBL and returning to the second-tier EBL Division 1. However, any hope that the drop to a lower division would help to stop the decline in the team's fortunes proved to be short-lived, as the battered franchise returned to Division 1 with a 5-13 record, leaving them finishing rock-bottom of their league for the third successive season. The club were spared a second relegation in as many seasons, as the EBL took the decision to expand Division 1 to 14 teams in the 2011/2012 season, but even this reprieve didn't help Capital's position, as they limped to last place, this time with an even worse win–loss record of 2–22. To make matters worse, Capital were found to have fielded an ineligible player during the course of the season, and would begin life in Division 2 with a 12-point deficit as a result.

Despite the penalty, the return to Division 2 finally saw some signs of recovery from Capital, with the team winning 17 of their 22 games to make the playoffs in their first season, finishing the league in 6th place. Even though the team exited the playoffs at the quarter-final stage, there should have been cause for optimism for the upcoming season. However, the start of the following season led to the team failing to fulfill their opening fixtures in the National Cup, Patron's Cup and the league, leading England Basketball to finally withdraw the team from competition.

== Home arenas ==
Capital City Academy (2004-2013)

== Season-by-season records ==
| Season | Div. | Pos. | Pld. | W | L | Pts. | Play Offs | Trophy | Cup |
|---|---|---|---|---|---|---|---|---|---|
North West London Wolverines
| 1998–1999 | NBL 3 | 3rd | 20 | 12 | 8 | 24 | Semi-final | - | - |
| 1999–2000 | NBL 3 | 7th | 24 | 9 | 15 | 18 | Quarter-final | - | - |
| 2000–2001 | NBL 3 | 9th | 24 | 9 | 15 | 18 | DNQ | - | - |
| 2001–2002 | NBL 1 | 8th | 22 | 7 | 15 | 14 | Quarter-final | - | - |
| 2002–2003 | NBL 1 | 3rd | 16 | 10 | 6 | 20 | Runner-up | - | - |
| 2003–2004 | EBL 2 | 1st | 20 | 19 | 1 | 38 | Runner-up | - | - |
London Capital
| 2004–2005 | EBL 1 | 9th | 22 | 7 | 25 | 14 | DNQ | - | - |
| 2005–2006 | EBL 1 | 11th | 26 | 6 | 20 | 12 | DNQ | - | - |
| 2006–2007 | EBL 1 | 5th | 22 | 13 | 9 | 26 | Semi-final | - | - |
| 2007–2008 | BBL | 9th | 33 | 12 | 21 | 24 | DNQ | 1st round | Quarter-final |
| 2008–2009 | BBL | 12th | 33 | 2 | 31 | 4 | DNQ | 1st round | Quarter-final |
| 2009–2010 | BBL | 13th | 36 | 3 | 33 | 6 | DNQ | 1st round | 1st round |
| 2010–2011 | EBL 1 | 10th | 18 | 5 | 13 | 10 | DNQ | 1st round | DNQ |
| 2011–2012 | EBL 1 | 13th | 24 | 2 | 22 | 4 | DNQ | 1st round | 1st round |
| 2012–2013 | EBL 2 | 6th | 22 | 17 | 5 | 22* | Quarter-final | 2nd round | 1st round |

Notes:

- In 2001 the NBL was restructured so Division One became the third tier replacing Division Two.
- In 2003 the NBL was replaced by the EBL which reverted Division Two back to the third tier.
- DNQ denotes Did not qualify.
- London Capital were deducted 12 points in the 2012/2013 campaign as a result of fielding an ineligible player in the previous season.

=== Notable former players ===
- (Nigeria) (United Kingdom) Kabiru Abu
- (United Kingdom) Steve Bucknall
- (Ghana) (United Kingdom) Jeff Danchie
- (South Sudan) (United Kingdom) Ajou Deng
- (Czech Republic) Jaromir Fohler
- (United Kingdom) Gareth Laws
- (United Kingdom) Chi Lewis-Parry
- (United States) (United Kingdom) Corey McGee
- (United States) Wes Miller
- (United Kingdom) Lijah Perkins
- (Nigeria) (United Kingdom) Lekan Popoola

== See also ==
- Basketball in England
- English Basketball League
