= Mohamed Niang =

Senegalese basketball player

retired
- Position: Power forward / center

Personal information
- Born: 14 March 1976 (age 50)
- Listed height: 6 ft 10 in (2.08 m)

Career information
- College: Delaware (1998-1999)
- Playing career: 1999–2008

Career history
- 2000–2001: Jilin Northeast Tigers
- 2003–2004: BG DEK/Fichte Hagen
- 2007–2008: Everton Tigers

Mohamed Niang (born 1976 in Dakar, Senegal) is a retired professional basketball player, who lastly played for British Basketball League rookies Everton Tigers, with whom he signed for in 2007.

== College career ==
After attending the University of Reims Champagne-Ardenne in France from 1994 to 1996, the 6 ft 10 in Centre then moved to the U.S. and to the University of Delaware, where from 1996 to 1999 he played on the university's Blue Hens basketball team.

In his first season, he played 12 games, scoring five points and pulled 10 rebounds. The 1997–98 season saw him feature in 11 games, scoring nine points, pulling six rebounds and blocking two shots.

== Professional career ==
Mohamed was a fifth round pick for the Huntsville Flight in the 2001-02 inaugural draft of the National Basketball Development League (Now called NBA D-League).

Niang most recently played in Denmark for Aalborg in 2004, averaging 22.5 pts, 9 rebounds, 2 blocks and 1.4 assists. He coached the team the following season while recovering from ACL injury and signed up to be a player/coach for Everton Tigers during the summer of 2007.

== Sources ==
- National Basketball Development League Announces Inaugural Draft Results
- Mohamed Niang - Sæson 2003- 2004 - Grundspillet
- Mohamed Niang er ny cheftræner hos AaB Basket
