= Hackney Academy (later Hackney College) =

Hackney Academy (later Hackney College) was a 19th-century seminary in London, known variously as Hackney Theological College, Hoxton Academy, and Highbury College. As the changing names suggest, it did not spend all of its existence in what is now the London Borough of Hackney. It eventually became part of New College, London, now subsumed within the University of London. The Hackney Theological Seminary began in 1802 as a philanthropic non-denominational venture promoted by the Anglican Rev. John Eyre of Homerton, and the Independent Rev. George Collison, with their associates, the Rev. Matthew Wilks of Whitefield's Tabernacle, Moorfields, and Rev. Rowland Hill of Surrey Chapel, Southwark. It opened the following year, with £10,000 from a wealthy resident of Homerton named Charles Townsend. This seminary was intended to send evangelical preachers into the countryside, what was at first called the Village Itinerancy Society, or Evangelical Association for the Propagation of the Gospel.

According to the Victoria County History:

The academy was managed by a committee, with George Collison of Walthamstow (Essex) as tutor, and used Eyre's house in Well Street, where the students lived in converted stabling until new quarters were built after purchase of the freehold in 1843. Training of Congregational ministers came to predominate over missionary work, although in 1898 the college's trustees had built or enlarged over 50 chapels, many of which they still maintained. The college moved to Finchley Road, Hampstead, in 1887.

The training of ministers evolved as only part of the academy's function. It also raised funds to build dozens of new chapels, and worked closely with the non-denominational London Missionary Society, with which several of the college's founders were associated, to promote missionary work. On Collison's death in 1847, the presidency of Hackney Academy passed to the Rev. John Watson (1804–1859) of Union Chapel, Islington, who died when struck down by a vehicle on London Bridge.

After 1871, the academy formally used the name Hackney College. In 1887, as it had outgrown its Well Street premises in Hackney, it took on new premises in Finchley Road, Hampstead, where it was associated with Peter Taylor Forsyth.

In 1900, it merged with New College London and became part of the University of London. From 1924 onwards, it was known as Hackney and New College. Confusingly, the Hampstead building frequently used the name Hackney College.

== See also ==
- Previous institutions known as Hackney College
