= Havering Sixth Form College =

Coordinates: 51.560911°N 0.232912°E

Location
- Wingletye Lane; Hornchurch, London, RM11 3TB; England

Information
- Type: Sixth Form College
- Established: 1991
- Principal: Janet Smith
- Deputy Principal: Paul Nutter
- Gender: Mixed
- Age: 16 to 19
- Enrolment: 2,060 (approx.)
- Telephone: 01708 514400
- Fax: 01708 514488
- Website: http://www.havering-sfc.ac.uk/

Havering Sixth Form College (alternatively styled Havering VI Form College), abbreviated as HSFC, is a sixth form college in Wingletye Lane, Hornchurch in the London Borough of Havering, East London, England. It is part of the New City College Group. Built on the site of Dury Falls Secondary School, it opened in September 1991, and educates full-time students from the ages of 16 to 19. The college offers a wide range of subjects, in A-level, BTEC and diploma formats, amongst others. The current principal is Janet Smith.

== Courses ==
The college offers many programmes of study for students of different abilities and talents. Qualifications offered include:

- AS level (Level 3)
- A level (Level 3)
- BTEC (Level 2, Level 3, Level 4 Art)
- GCSE (Level 2)
- ILEX (Level 2)
- T Level (Level 3)
- Extended Project Qualification

The International Baccalaureate formally used to offered however, now that is no longer the case.

== Buildings ==
The college is divided into nine main buildings, or blocks:

- Library Wing (ICT, computing, history, politics, health and social care)
- Science Wing (sciences)
- Theatre Wing (performing arts, music)
- Dury Falls Wing (business studies, economics, law)
- Newcourt (sociology, psychology, mathematics, law)
- Gatehouse (English, classical civilization, languages)
- Minster Court (art, graphics, photography, product design, media)
- Horsa Building (art, dance)
- International Building (geography, religious studies, philosophy, archaeology)
- Berners-Lee House (ICT, computing)
- Olympia House (Travel and Tourism)

== Facilities ==
- Large athletics hall
- Completely furbished gym, complete with all manner of exercise machines
- Fully equipped theatre space, with lighting, sound and recording facilities
- Numerous sound-proof recording studios
- Comprehensive library, with internet capabilities

== Notable alumni ==
- Michael Adebolajo, Islamic terrorist convicted of the Murder of Lee Rigby
- Tim Aker, Politician and MEP
- Alex Day, Musician
- Eddie Hearn, Sports Promoter
- Mark Hunter, Olympic Gold Medalist
- Sally Oliver, Actress
- Sara Pascoe, Comedian
