= Drew Sullivan =

English professional basketball player (born 1980)

Personal information
- Born: 12 February 1980 (age 46) London, England
- Listed height: 6 ft 8 in (2.03 m)
- Listed weight: 104 kg (229 lb)

Career information
- High school: St. Augustine Prep (Richland, New Jersey)
- College: Villanova (1999–2003)
- NBA draft: 2003: undrafted
- Playing career: 2003–2016
- Position: Forward

Career history

Playing
- 2003–2004: EiffelTowers Nijmegen
- 2004–2006: Newcastle Eagles
- 2006–2007: Joventut Badalona
- 2007–2008: Dexia Mons-Hainaut
- 2008: Newcastle Eagles
- 2008–2009: CSK VVS Samara
- 2009–2010: Apollon Limassol
- 2010: Newcastle Eagles
- 2010–2011: Mersey Tigers
- 2011–2014: Leicester Riders
- 2014–2015: London Lions
- 2015–2016: Leicester Riders

Coaching
- 2017–2018: Great Britain national team (assistant)

Career highlights
- 2× British League MVP (2006, 2013); 3× BBL Trophy MVP (2006, 2011, 2016); BBL Cup MVP (2014)
Medals
Men's basketball
Representing England
Commonwealth Games
| Bronze medal – third place | 2006 Melbourne | Team |

Andrew Raymond Richard Sullivan (born 12 February 1980), known as Drew Sullivan, is a British retired basketball player. In his career, he played for several clubs in Europe and was the captain of the Great Britain national team. He was a two-time MVP of the British Basketball League.

== High school career ==
The only child of Eunice Sullivan, Andrew moved from his London home to the United States in 1996 where he attended St. Augustine Preparatory School, in Richland, New Jersey. In his prep career, he scored 1,368 points, averaging 19.8 PPG as a senior. Coached by Paul Rodio his team had a 24–6 record and he was named in the first team all-state as well as being voted as South Jersey Player of the Year 1999.

== College career ==
In 1999, Sullivan enrolled in the School of Arts & Sciences at Villanova University, home of the Wildcats basketball team, from which he graduated in 2003. The athlete was Villanova's most versatile defender and could guard four positions.

Sullivan took to his first season with the Wildcats in 1999–2000, on his debut playing with three rebounds and tough defense in seven minutes against Lafayette, and later the freshman converted his first career points with a 3-point shot from the top of the key in the first half against Fairleigh Dickinson. He tied a career-high with seven points in 12 minutes in a 67–66 loss to Miami on 17 January 2000 and three days later grabbed five rebounds and scored five points in a 66–57 win at Providence. Overall, it was a successful rookie season for the Englishman, in which another highlight unfolded when he made several plays in an 86–69 win over Notre Dame, ending the night with seven points and five rebounds in 14 minutes of activity. By the end of the season, Sullivan had played 29 games, averaging 2.31 PPG.

His second season saw his minutes fluctuate throughout the campaign, playing just 20 games and averaging a mere 1.65 PPG, although he did earn a career-high 26 minutes, playing with energy and strong defense in an 87–75 win over Towson University on 26 November 2000 he contributed four points and five rebounds. Returning from injury, Sullivan also scored another four points in 23 minutes of activity in a 74–60 win over Connecticut on 10 February 2001.

The following season would prove to be much more successful than the previous when he established himself as Villanova's best perimeter defensive player in 2001–02.He was the only Wildcat to start all 32 contests and connected on .529 of his field goal attempts, chalking up a 5.65 PPG average, or a combined total of 181 points throughout the season.

Sullivan started the season well, when he contributed six points and six rebounds in a 59–57 win over Dayton on 24 November 2001. His key steal on Dayton's last offensive possession gave the Wildcats a chance to win on a final trip down the floor and his 28 minutes established a new career high as did his point total. Three days later Sullivan better his minutes record, logging a career-high 39 minutes in a 61–58 overtime loss against La Salle University.

Later that season Sullivan came within a whisker of his first career double-double, with nine points and nine rebounds in a 71–59 loss at University of Pittsburgh on 2 February 2002 and a week later helped hold Jason Kapono to nine points on 3-of-9 shooting in 58–57 Villanova victory over UCLA. Sullivan's season finished in a 72–70 loss to Connecticut in Big East tournament on 7 March 2002 where he produced nine rebounds and four points.

== Professional career ==
After leaving Villanova in 2003, Sullivan travelled to the Netherlands to sign a professional contract with leading Dutch club EiffelTowers from the city of Nijmegen. After just one season in the Netherlands, Sullivan returned to his homeland and immediately signed for leading British Basketball League team the Newcastle Eagles in 2004. Despite being pipped to the league title by just two points, "Sulli's" season was incredibly successful. Not only did he help his team win the Championship Play-offs in a 78–75 win over the Chester Jets, but he was also the game high scorer with 27 points and was named as the MVP of the Championship.

Following an incredible debut season in England, the future was looking bright for the British talent, and despite receiving several offers to play on the European continent, Sullivan opted to stay with the Eagles for another season, resigning for 2005–06, and it paid handsomely.

The Newcastle Eagles dominated the regular season, and conquered every tournament they participated in. First claiming the BBL Trophy with a 71–51 win over the Leicester Riders, Sullivan himself contributing with a game high 18 points, as well as 11 rebounds, 4 assists and 3 steals, which earned him the MVP award. The Eagles doubled their success with an 83–69 victory in the final of the BBL Cup against London Towers, with another 18 points, and also 2 blocked shots coming from the power forward.

After capturing the League title, Newcastle then went on to win the Championship Play-offs to complete the "clean sweep" of trophies. Sullivan scored 19 points in the final, an 83–68 win against the Scottish Rocks at Birmingham's National Indoor Arena. To complete his victorious season, Sullivan was also named as the BBL Player of the Year 2006.

With every title won in just two years in England, seemingly Sullivan's work there was done and a fresh challenge was sought after. Europe came calling again and this time, he jumped at the chance of playing with European basketball's elite in the Euroleague. In the summer of 2006, he signed for Spanish ACB club Joventut Badalona, where he joined fellow Brits Robert Archibald and Andy Betts.

After a season struggling with minutes and court time in Spain, and following the departure of his British teammates, Sullivan moved to Belgium to sign for Dexia Mons-Hainaut, who is coached by Great Britain coach Chris Finch.

In September 2008 it was announced that Sullivan would once again represent the Newcastle Eagles after signing a two-month contract with the Eagles while waiting for the right offer from a European outfit. He quickly moved on to CSK VVS Samara of the Russian basketball league where he also played in the EuroChallenge.

In November 2009 Sullivan played for Pizza Express Primetel Apollon in the first division of Cyprus.

In January 2010 Sullivan moved back to the Newcastle Eagles and has helped win the BBL Cup and the League Title. In summer 2010 he signed for Mersey Tigers.

In October 2011 Sullivan quit Mersey Tigers following a dispute regarding pay. A week later, he signed with Leicester Riders on a week-to-week contract. and then on 1 December 2011 he signed to the riders for the rest of the season. Sullivan remained at Riders for three successful years and was part of the 2013 treble winning team, claiming the BBL Championship regular season and Play-off crown's as well as winning the BBL Cup.

In August 2014, after weeks of speculation, Sullivan was signed by his hometown team London Lions for the 2014–15 season. At the official unveiling, Sullivan claimed it was his intention to see out the remainder of his career at the Lions, although he subsequently returned to the Leicester Riders for the following season.

== International career ==
=== England ===
Sullivan's successes have not just been restricted to his club teams, but continued with the England national team competing at the 2006 Commonwealth Games in Melbourne. An 80–58 victory against Nigeria in the third place game, in which Sullivan did not play, awarded England the bronze medal and the team returned home triumphant. In the four games that he did feature, Sullivan averaged 31 minutes-per-game, 5 rebounds-per-game and 18.25 points-per-game, with his tournament high coming against South Africa where he scored 23 points in a 95–53 win.

=== Great Britain ===
More recently, Andrew has featured in the newly founded Great Britain national team who competed in Eurobasket 2009 and whose aim is to push for a medal at the London 2012 Olympic Games. One of only two players, along with Nate Reinking, to remain from the inception of the Great Britain programme in 2006, Andrew has been the GB team's captain in recent years. He starred in GB's successful promotion campaign out of Division B in 2006-7 when he averaged 10.6 ppg. However, he has been a stalwart presence ever since and enters 2012 as the country's second most capped player (behind Reinking).

Sullivan competed for Great Britain at the 2012 Summer Olympics, where the British team finished 9th.
