= Chris Haslam (basketball) =

British basketball player and coach

Chris Haslam (born 27 May 1974 in Southport, England) is a British basketball coach and former player.

He played at the University of Wyoming in NCAA Division I in the mid 1990s. He has spent spells all over Europe, with Apollon Patras BC in Greece, RBC Verviers-Pepinster and Euphony Liège in Belgium, Mitteldeutscher BC in Germany and for the last three seasons, Pallacanestro Messina, Teramo Basket and Basket Trapani in Italy. He also played for Everton Tigers in the British Basketball League.

He was an assistant coach at Montana State University from 2013-2023, helping the Bobcats to the 2022 and 2023 Big Sky tournament Championships.

After Montana State, Haslam became an assistant coach at Utah State University. While at Utah State, Haslam helped the Aggies win an outright Mountain West title in the 2023-24 season.

Haslam is now an assistant at Oregon State Beavers men’s basketball
