= Steve Bucknall =

English basketball player (born 1966)

Personal information
- Born: 17 March 1966 (age 60) London, England
- Listed height: 6 ft 6 in (1.98 m)
- Listed weight: 215 lb (98 kg)

Career information
- High school: Governor Dummer Academy (Byfield, Massachusetts)
- College: North Carolina (1985–1989)
- NBA draft: 1989: undrafted
- Playing career: 1989–2007
- Position: Shooting guard
- Number: 24

Career history
- 1989–1990: Los Angeles Lakers
- 1990–1991: Sunderland Saints
- 1991–1992: Stuttgart
- 1992–1993: ASVEL Basket
- 2005–2007: Leicester Riders

Career highlights
- Second-team All-ACC (1989); Second-team Parade All-American (1985); McDonald's All-American (1985)
- Stats at NBA.com
- Stats at Basketball Reference

Steven Lee Bucknall OBE (born 17 March 1966) is a retired English professional basketball player, and former head coach of British Basketball League (BBL) expansion franchise London Capital.

A 1.98 m (6 ft 6 in) and 97.5 kg (215 lb) shooting guard, Bucknall was the third English-born player in the United States' NBA and the first who actually grew up in his country of birth, where he started playing as a Junior at Crystal Palace Basketball Club in London. He played for the Los Angeles Lakers, with whom he had a brief stint after graduating from the University of North Carolina.

Prior to matriculation at the University of North Carolina, he played high school basketball for Governor Dummer Academy, now known as The Governor's Academy, which is part of the ISL (Independent School League).

He subsequently went on to play in a number of European countries including Greece, France, Italy as well as his native UK.

Prior to his retirement, Bucknall played for the bronze medal-winning English basketball team in the Melbourne Commonwealth Games in 2006. He also has a son Marcus Bucknall who plays for Mandoulides Thessaloniki. He follows his father's footsteps, playing for the All-Thassaloniki team.

== Playing history ==
- London Thunder (2016–2017)
- Leicester Riders (2005–2006)
- Olympique Antibes, France (2004–05)
- Iraklis Thessaloniki, Greece (2003–04)
- Birmingham Bullets, (2002-transferred)
- Aris Thessaloniki, Greece (2001–02)
- London Towers (1999–2001)
- Reggio Emilia, Italy (1998–99)
- Iraklis Thessaloniki, Greece (1996–98)
- London Towers (1995–96)
- Thames Valley Tigers (1994–95)
- Le Mans, France (1993–94)
- Villeurbanne, France (1992–93)
- Stuttgart, Germany (1991–92)
- Sunderland (1990–91)
- Los Angeles Lakers, U.S. (1989–90)
- Tulsa Fast Breakers (CBA), U.S. (drafted only)
- Crystal Palace (1983–84) (three games only)
- Crystal Palace Juniors

== Coaching history ==
- London Capital (2007–2008)
- Thunder Basketball club (2008–present), national champions, 2011 U18 Boys
- London Capitals BBL 2007 -2008
- England U18 Boys 2010–2013, achieved promotion into Division A

== Career statistics ==
Legend
GP	Games played	GS	Games started	MPG	Minutes per game
FG%	Field goal percentage	3P%	3-point field goal percentage	FT%	Free throw percentage
RPG	Rebounds per game	APG	Assists per game	SPG	Steals per game
BPG	Blocks per game	PPG	Points per game	**Bold**	Career high

=== NBA ===
==== Regular season ====
Year	Team	GP	GS	MPG	FG%	3P%	FT%	RPG	APG	SPG	BPG	PPG
1989–90	L.A. Lakers	18	0	4.2	.273	.000	.833	.4	.6	.1	.1	1.3

== Honors ==
- Championship Winner – 1995–96
- Championship Runner-up – 1994–95, 1990–91
- Play-off Runner-up – 1995–96, 1990–91
- BBL Trophy Winner – 1999–2000, 1995–96, 1994–95
- Southern Conference Winner – 2000–01, 1999–2000
- National Cup Winner – 1995–96, 1990–91
- National Cup Runner-up – 1994–95
- England International (91 caps) Debut v Spain 1990–1252 points (15.3ppg)
- League All-Star Team – 2000–01, 1999–2000, 1995–96, 1994–95, 1990–91
- All-Star Game – 1999–2000, 1994–95, 1990–91
- Great Britain 1988 & 1992 (22 caps)

== See also ==
- 1989–90 NBA season
- England national basketball team
