= Perry Lawson =

British basketball player

Essex Leopards
- League: English Basketball League

Personal information
- Listed height: 6 ft 1 in (1.85 m)

Career information
- Playing career: 2006–present

Career history
- 2006–2006: Newcastle Eagles
- 2016–present: Essex Leopards

Perry Lawson (born 8 March 1982 in Northampton, England) is a British professional basketball player who currently plays for Essex Leopards in the English Basketball League.

The 6 ft 1 in (1.85 m) in tall guard, able to play both shooting guard and point guard, was educated at South Georgia Tech in the United States. Lawson is an upcoming talent in the BBL, and joined London United from the Newcastle Eagles at the beginning of the 2006-07 season. He was a key part of the Newcastle Eagles 2006 team that won the clean sweep of BBL Championship, BBL Play-offs, BBL Cup and BBL Trophy. Lawson has also played for the England National Team and is a current member of GB National Team.

Lawson is an adept guard either as a starter or off the bench, who is solid and reliable bringing the ball up court, and making assists and chances for others. He started his playing career with local team Hackney White Heat (2002) before eventually turning professional with the Eagles in 2004. He is a graduate of the Hackney Community College Basketball Academy programme, current coach and founder of Enfield Scorpions Basketball Club playing in National and Community Basketball League [CBL]
