= Delme Herriman =

British basketball player (born 1973)

Personal information
- Born: 8 May 1973 (age 53) Harrogate, England
Medals
Men's basketball
Representing England
Commonwealth Games
Bronze medal – third place	2006 Melbourne	Team

Delme Herriman (born 8 May 1973) is a British former professional basketball player.

Herriman, who was born in Harrogate and grew up in Widnes, played college basketball in the United States for Wright State University. During a 1995 Midwestern Collegiate Conference quarterfinal game, he made what has been called "the most famous shot in Wright State basketball history", a last-second, game-winning jumper against a ranked Xavier University team. After college, Herriman played in Italy, Belgium, the Netherlands, Germany, France, Austria, and England. Herriman was also part of the England team that claimed the bronze medal in Men’s Basketball at the 2006 Commonwealth Games. Head Coach of Liverpool Basketball D2 Men's team, 2016 – present. D2 Coach of the year 2017/18 D2 Coach of the year 2018/19 D2 National Champions undefeated 20–0 (2018/19) D2 National play-off Champions 2019 Director of Archbishop beck sports college. ABL North Coach of the year 2018/19 Undefeated ABL North:10-0 2018/19 National quarter finalists 2019.

Herriman later became a basketball coach. He has completed an autobiography titled Mr. Versatility.
