= Thomasius =

Thomasius is a surname, and may refer to:

- Jakob Thomasius (1622–1684), German philosopher
- Christian Thomasius (1655–1728), German jurist and philosopher
- Gottfried Thomasius (1802–1875), German theologian
