= P. T. Forsyth =

Scottish theologian (1848–1921)

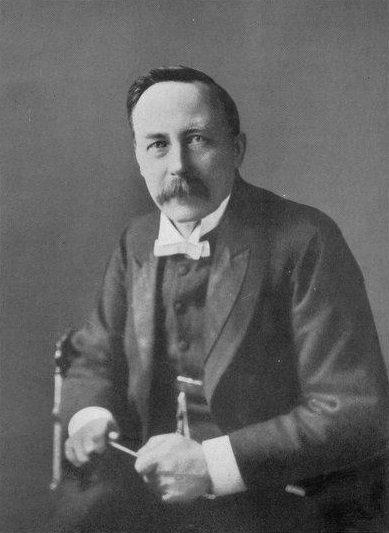
P. T. Forsyth

Peter Taylor Forsyth (1848–1921) was a Scottish theologian.

== Biography ==
The son of a postman, Forsyth studied at the University of Aberdeen and then in Göttingen (under Albrecht Ritschl). He was ordained into the Congregational ministry and served churches as pastor at Bradford, Manchester, Leicester and Cambridge, before becoming Principal of Hackney College, London (later subsumed into the University of London) in 1901.

== Theology ==
An early interest in critical theology made him suspect to some more 'orthodox' Christians. However, he increasingly came to the conclusion that liberal theology failed to account adequately for the moral problem of the guilty conscience. This led him to a moral crisis which he found resolved in the atoning work of Christ. The experience helped to shape and inform a vigorous interest in the issues of holiness and atonement. Although Forsyth rejected many of his earlier liberal leanings he retained many of Adolf von Harnack's criticisms of Chalcedonian Christology. This led him to expound a kenotic doctrine of the incarnation (clearly influenced by Bishop Charles Gore and Thomasius). Where he differed from other kenotic theologies of the atonement was the claim that Christ did not give up his divine attributes but condensed them; i.e., the incarnation was the expression of God's omnipotence rather than its negation. His theology and attack on liberal Christianity can be found in his most famous work, The Person and Place of Jesus Christ (1909), which anticipated much of the neo-orthodox theology of the next generation. He has sometimes been coined the 'Barthian before Barth', but this fails to account for many areas of divergence with the Swiss theologian's thought.

While many of Forsyth's most significant insights have largely gone ignored, not a few consider him to be among the greatest English-speaking theologians of the early twentieth century.

In his Christian Theology: An Introduction, Alister E. McGrath describes Forsyth's Justification of God (1916). The book

represents an impassioned plea to allow the notion of the “justice of God” to be rediscovered. Forsyth is less concerned than Anselm for the legal and juridical aspects of the cross; his interest centers on the manner in which the cross is inextricably linked with “the whole moral fabric and movement of the universe.” The doctrine of the atonement is inseparable from “the rightness of things.”

In his Theology and the Problem of Evil, Kenneth Surin points to Forsyth's Justification of God as offering a theodicy based on the cross. God can be justified for creating a world with so much pain and suffering “only if [God] were prepared to share the burden of pain and suffering with [God's] creatures.” Surin concurs with Forsyth.

Forsyth wrote The Justification of God while the first world war was killing ten million and wounding another twenty million from around the world. Through the lens of biblical faith, Forsyth saw even “a world catastrophe and judgment of the first rank like the war” as “still in the hand and service of God.”

Before the start of World War I, widely held views about God and human progress muted the theodic question. “Popular religion” had preached a God whose sole purpose was “to promote and crown [human] development.” The “doctrine of progress” (first formulated by Abbé de Saint-Pierre) dominated Europe. But as Forsyth observed, the war's “revelation of the awful and desperate nature of evil” exploded these optimistic views and raised the theodic question about the goodness of God to full force.

There was no theodicy extant to which Forsyth could turn. In spite of his extensive theological studies, he could find no satisfactory “philosophical theodicy or vindication of God's justice.” From this, Forsyth concluded that no human reason can "justify God in a world like this. [God] must justify [God's] self, and [God] did so in the Cross of [God's] Son." Forsyth began formulating what he called "God's own theodicy" with Romans 1.17: "the righteousness of God is revealed from faith to faith". There he found the righteousness of God revealed in the Christ who "is the theodicy of God and the justifier both of God and the ungodly."

[Christ] brings God's providence to the bar of God’s own promise. In Christ, God is fully justified by [God's] self. If any [one] thinks [one] has anything to suffer in the flesh, God more. In all their afflictions [God] was more afflicted.

For Forsyth, "God's own theodicy" stood in contrast to theodicies devised by humans. God's own theodicy provided Forsyth no philosophical answers to why in God's "creation must the way upward lie through suffering?" "The tactics of providence cannot be traced," but God's "purpose we have, and [God's] heart. We have [God]." God's own theodicy is a theodicy of reconciliation and relationship, a theodicy that enables trust in God in spite of unanswered questions.

Forsyth's understanding of "God's own theodicy" as enabling a right relationship with God rather than a philosophical justification of God contrasts two alternative connotations of the word 'theodicy'. Theodicy derives from the Greek words theos ("God") and dikē, which can be translated either (a) just (and its derivatives justice, justified, etc.) or (b) right (and its derivatives righteousness, righteoused, etc.). Righteoused is an obsolete verb meaning “made righteous.” A theodicy designed to justify connotes rational arguments. But a theodicy designed to righteous connotes relationship. In the Bible righteousness is primarily relational.

== Selected Books by Forsyth ==
- Pulpit Parables for Young Hearers. Manchester/London: Brook & Chrystal/Simpkin, Marshall/Hamilton, Adams, 1886.
- Religion in Recent Art: Being Expository Lectures on Rossetti, Burne Jones, Watts, Holman Hunt, and Wagner. Hodder and Stoughton, 1889.
- The Charter of the Church: Six Lectures on the Spiritual Principle of Nonconformity. Alexander & Shepheard, 1896.
- The Holy Father and the Living Christ. London: Hodder & Stoughton, 1897.
- Intercessory Services for Aid in Public Worship. Manchester: John Heywood, 1896.
- Rome, Reform and Reaction: Four Lectures on the Religious Situation. London: Hodder & Stoughton, 1899.
- Positive Preaching and Modern Mind: The Lyman Beecher Lecture on Preaching, Yale University, 1907. Hodder & Stoughton, 1907.
- Missions in State and Church: Sermons and Addresses. Hodder & Stoughton, 1908.
- Socialism, the Church and the Poor. Hodder & Stoughton, 1908.
- The Cruciality of the Cross. Hodder & Stoughton, 1910.
- The Person and Place of Jesus Christ: The Congregational Union Lecture for 1909. Congregational Union of England and Wales/Hodder & Stoughton, 1909.
- The Work of Christ. Hodder & Stoughton, 1910.
- Christ on Parnassus: Lectures on Art, Ethic, and Theology. Hodder & Stoughton, 1911.
- Faith, Freedom, and the Future. Hodder & Stoughton, 1912.
- Marriage: Its Ethic and Religion. Hodder & Stoughton, 1912.
- The Principle of Authority in Relation to Certainty, Sanctity and Society: An Essay in the Philosophy of Experimental Religion. Independent, 1912.
- Theology in Church and State. Hodder & Stoughton, 1915.
- The Christian Ethic of War. Longmans, Green, 1916.
- The Justification of God: Lectures for War-Time on a Christian Theodicy. Duckworth, 1916.
- The Soul of Prayer. Charles H. Kelly, 1916.
- The Church and the Sacraments. Independent, 1917.
- This Life and the Next: The Effect on This Life of Faith in Another. Macmillan, 1918.

== Secondary Literature ==
- Benedetto, Robert. P. T. Forsyth Bibliography and Index. Greenwood Press, 1993.
- Brown, Robert McAfee. P. T. Forsyth: Prophet for Today. Westminster, 1952.
- Escott, Harry, ed. Peter Taylor Forsyth (1848–1921), Director of Souls: Selections from his Practical Writings. Epworth, 1948.
- –––––––. P. T. Forsyth and the Cure of Souls: An Appraisement and Anthology of His Practical Writings. George Allen and Unwin, 1970.
- Floyd, Richard L. When I Survey the Wondrous Cross: Reflections on the Atonement. Pickwick, 2000.
- Goroncy, Jason A. Hallowed be Thy Name: The Sanctification of All Things in the Soteriology of P. T. Forsyth. T&T Clark, 2013.
- Goroncy, Jason A., ed. Descending on Humanity and Intervening in History: Notes from the Pulpit Ministry of P. T. Forsyth. Pickwick, 2013.
- Hart, Trevor A., ed. Justice the True and Only Mercy: Essays on the Life and Theology of Peter Taylor Forsyth. T&T Clark, 1995.
- Hunter, Archibald M. P. T. Forsyth: Per Crucem ad Lucem. SCM, 1974.
- Kawakami, Naoya. 日本におけるフォーサイス受容の研究 –神学の現代的課題の探求. Christian Literature Society of Japan, 2012.
- Leow, Theng Huat. The Theodicy of Peter Taylor Forsyth: A “Crucial” Justification of the Ways of God to Man. Wipf and Stock, 2011.
- McCurdy, Leslie C. Attributes and Atonement: The Holy Love of God in the Theology of P. T. Forsyth. Paternoster, 1998.
- Moser, Paul K. and Benjamin Nasmith, eds. God of Holy Love: Essays of Peter Taylor Forsyth. Pickwick, 2019.
- Sell, Alan P. F., ed. P T Forsyth: Theologian for a New Millennium. The United Reformed Church, 2000.

== See also ==
- Theodicy and the Bible
