= Hackney White Heat =

- League: EBL Division 3 (South)
- Established: 1996
- History: London Towers B 1996-1998; London Towers A 1998-1999; Islington White Heat; 1999-2000; InterBasket London; 2000-2002; Hackney White Heat; 2002-present
- Arena: The SPACe Centre, Hackney Community College
- Location: Hackney, London
- Team colours: White / Black
- Head coach: James Hoyle
Home	Away

Hackney White Heat was an English basketball team from the district of Hackney in London. The club were members of the top tier of the former National Basketball League before the competition was reformatted into the current English Basketball League.

== History ==
The team originally began as the "B" team of the London Towers, largely consisting of the Towers' under-23 players. The club joined NBL Division 2 in 1996, and quickly earned promotion to Division 1 in 1998 by claiming 3rd place in the league and the runner-up position in the playoffs. After a single season in Division 1, they were forced to break away from their link to the Towers, following a ruling banning 'reserve' teams from the division. The newly independent team competed for a year as the Islington White Heat, and were almost removed again when the NBL rebranded their upper rank as the NBL Conference. Following an appeal, the team were allowed to continue in the new league, and took the name Inter-Basket London to try and appeal to a wider community.

The club's time in the short-lived NBL Conference saw little return for their efforts, never finishing above the bottom three. By the time the English Basketball League was formed in 2003, the club had rebranded themselves again, becoming the Hackney White Heat. The new league saw new, tougher rules for their upper tier, leaving Hackney no choice but to drop from the new EBL Division 1 into EBL Division 2 before a single game had tipped off. Further decline was to follow, as they finished next to bottom in Division 2 in 2005, leading to relegation to Division 3.

== Season-by-season records ==
Season	Division	Played	Won	Lost	Points	League	Playoffs	National Cup	National Trophy	Patron's Cup	National Shield
London Towers 'B'
1996-97	D2	26	22	4	44	2nd	Semi-final		1st Round	DNE	DNE
1997-98	D2	24	19	5	38	3rd	Runner-up		Quarter-final	DNE	DNE
London Towers 'A'
1998-99	D1	26	17	9	34	5th	Quarter-final		3rd Round	DNE	DNE
Islington White Heat
1999-00	D1	24	12	12	24	6th	Quarter-final		Quarter-final	DNE	DNE
InterBasket London
2000-01	Conf	21	7	14	14	6th	Quarter-final		Runner-up	DNE	DNE
2001-02	Conf	18	5	13	10	8th	Quarter-final		1st Round	DNE	DNE
Hackney White Heat
2002-03	Conf	22	3	19	6	11th	DNQ		Quarter-final	DNE	DNE
2003-04	D2	20	12	8	24	5th	Semi-final	1st Round	DNE	Runner-up	DNE
2004-05	D2	19	5	14	10	10th	DNQ	3rd Round	DNE	1st Round	DNE
2005-06	D3 SE	16	9	7	18	5th	DNQ	2nd Round	DNE	DNE	1st Round
2006-07	D3 S	16	9	7	18	4th	Semi-final	1st Round	DNE	DNE	2nd Round
2007-08	D3 S	22	10	12	20	7th	DNQ	2nd Round	DNE	DNE	3rd Round
2008–09	D3 S	22	9	13	18	8th	DNQ	1st Round	DNE	DNE	2nd Round
2009–10	D3 S	17	5	12	10	8th	DNQ	2nd Round	DNE	DNE	2nd Round
2010–11	D3 S	20	5	15	10	11th	DNQ	2nd Round	DNE	DNE	2nd Round
2011–12	D3 S	20	11	9	18	6th	DNQ	1st Round	DNE	DNE	2nd Round
2012–13	D3 S	17	8	9	16	6th	DNQ	1st Round	DNE	DNE	3rd Round
2013–14	D3 S	20	12	8	24	4th	Semi-final	1st Round	DNE	DNE	2nd Round

Notes:

- From 2000 to 2003 the NBL Conference operated as the second-tier league, ahead of Division One.
- In 2003 the NBL was replaced by the EBL, which reinstated Division One as the second tier.

== Former players ==
- Pops Mensah-Bonsu
- Perry Lawson
- Serhat Urkut A.K.A Haribo
