= Nate Reinking =

British-American basketball player and coach (born 1973)

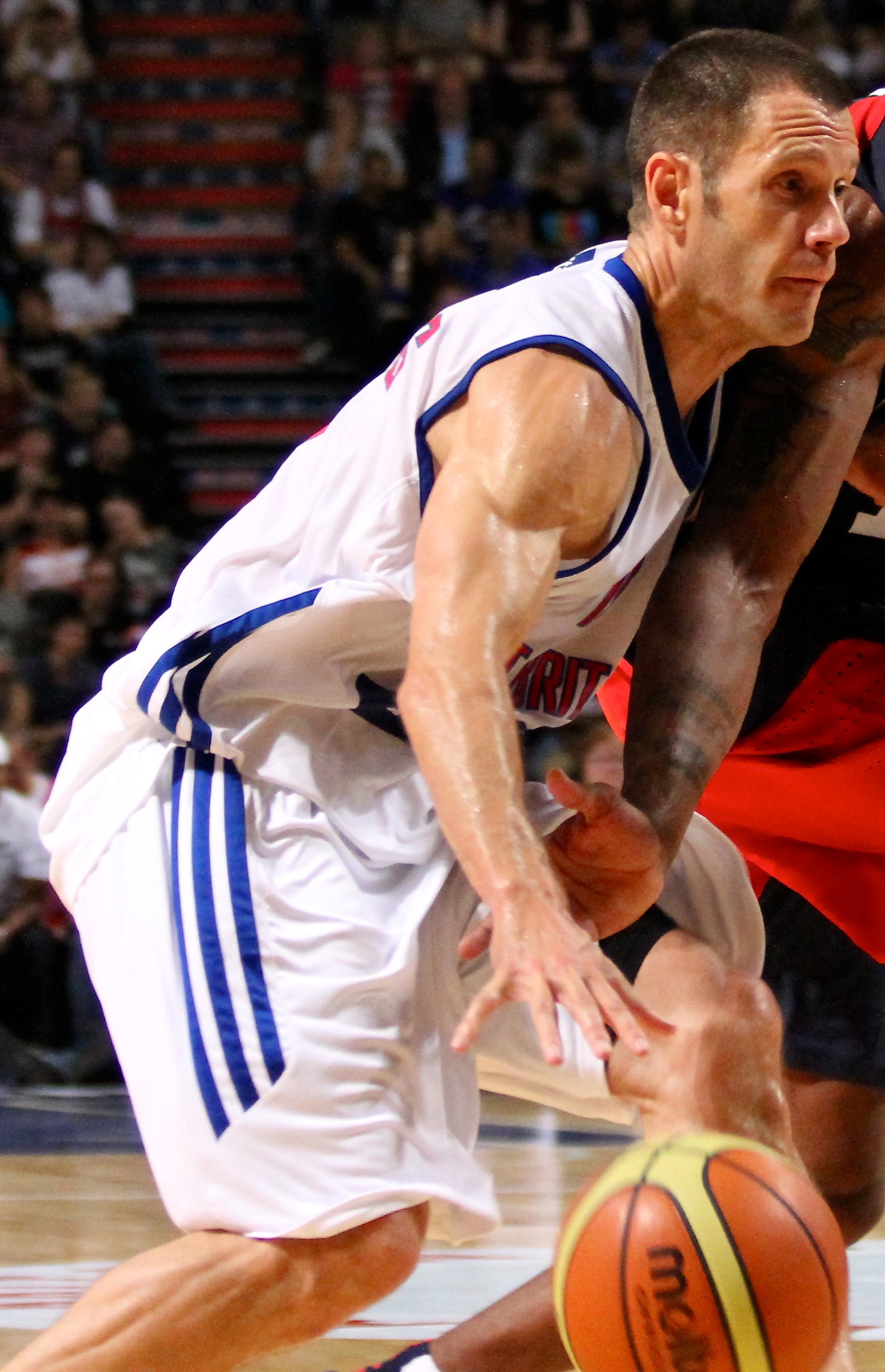
- Reinking in 2012

Cleveland Cavaliers
- Title: Assistant coach
- League: NBA

Personal information
- Born: 12 December 1973 (age 52) Upper Sandusky, Ohio, U.S.
- Listed height: 1.88 m (6 ft 2 in)

Career information
- High school: Galion (Galion, Ohio)
- College: Kent State (1992–1996)
- NBA draft: 1996: undrafted
- Playing career: 1996–2012
- Position: Point guard
- Coaching career: 2013–present

Career history
- 1996–1998: Leicester Riders
- 1998–1999: Derby Storm
- 1999–2005: Sheffield Sharks
- 2005–2007: Bree
- 2007–2010: Belfius Mons-Hainaut
- 2010–2011: Mersey Tigers
- 2011–2012: Sheffield Sharks

Coaching
- 2013–2015: Canton Charge (assistant)
- 2016–2021: Canton Charge
- 2021–present: Cleveland Cavaliers (assistant)

Nate James Reinking (born 12 December 1973) is a British-American professional basketball coach and former player who serves as an assistant coach for the Cleveland Cavaliers of the National Basketball Association (NBA).

== Professional career ==
Having graduated from Kent State University, Reinking came to England and signed with the British Basketball League club Leicester Riders in 1996. He averaged 18.3 points per game and 3.0 rebounds per game in his first season for the Midlands team. In 1998, Nate joined Riders' rivals the Derby Storm, where he posted 17.9 points per game and 2.3 rebounds per game. The following season, he moved further north again to sign with the Sheffield Sharks, where he spent six seasons before moving to the Belgian League and Euphony Bree in 2005, and then onto Dexia Mons-Hainaut in 2007.

== Coaching career ==
In October 2013, Reinking was hired by the Canton Charge as an assistant coach for the 2013–14 season. After Jordi Fernandez accepted an assistant coach job with the Nuggets, Reinking was promoted to head coach of the Canton Charge. In July 2019, Reinking was named head coach of the Great Britain national team, to go alongside his position with Canton. In 2021, he became an assistant coach with the Charge's parent team, the Cleveland Cavaliers in the National Basketball Association.

== National team career ==
Reinking made his debut for the Great Britain men's national team in a FIBA EuroBasket 2007 qualifying match against Slovakia, on 2 September 2006. He was a member of every Great Britain squad as a player until his retirement following the 2012 Summer Olympics, and then as an assistant coach from 2013 to 2017. On 26 July 2019, Reinking was named head coach of Great Britain, where he led GB to a 4–0 record during round three of FIBA EuroBasket 2022 pre-qualifiers. On 3 May 2023, Reinking stepped down as head coach of Great Britain.
