= Rashaad Powell =

American basketball player

Personal information
- Born: June 14, 1981 (age 45) Renton, Washington, U.S.
- Listed height: 6 ft 5 in (1.96 m)
- Listed weight: 215 lb (98 kg)

Career information
- High school: Renton (Renton, Washington)
- College: Chemeketa CC (1999–2001); Idaho (2001–2004)
- NBA draft: 2004: undrafted
- Playing career: 2004–2015
- Position: Shooting guard

Career history
- 2004–2005: Bellevue Blackhawks
- 2005: Tacoma Thunder
- 2005: Yakima Sun Kings
- 2005–2006: Tacoma Navigators
- 2006: Seattle Mountaineers
- 2007: Everett Explosion
- 2007–2008: Albany Patroons
- 2007–2008: An Nahl Sharjah Club
- 2008: Snohomish County Explosion
- 2008–2009: Bucaneros de Campeche
- 2008–2009: Al Fatah
- 2009: Al Kahraba
- 2009: Satria Muda BritAma Jakarta
- 2009–2011: Seattle Mountaineers
- 2011: West Coast Hotshots
- 2011–2015: Seattle Mountaineers

Career highlights
- BWC Defense Player of the Year (2004)

Rashaad Dominic Powell (born June 14, 1981) is an American basketball coach and former player. He played college basketball for Idaho, where he was named the Big West Conference Defense Player of the Year in 2004, and later professionally for several seasons.

== Basketball career ==
=== Scholastic ===
Powell attended Renton High School in Renton, graduating in 1999. As a senior, he averaged 20 points, 12 rebounds, six assists, three steals and two blocks per game en route to becoming the league's most valuable player. He then attended Chemeketa Community College (Salem, Oregon) from September 1999 to June 2001. While at Chemeketa, Powell continued to hone his skills, playing multiple positions. By his sophomore year he was the team co-captain, and concluded the season averaging 14 points, six rebounds, three assists, one steal and one block per game. Upon graduating with a General Studies Associate Arts degree, he accepted an offer from the University of Idaho to join the team as a walk-on. By the third game he had become a starter. He was sidelined shortly thereafter due to a dislocated right shoulder, and would medical redshirt the remainder of the 2001–2002 season. Powell returned for the next two seasons. Powell was also named the 2003–04 Big West Conference Defensive Player of the Year, while graduating with a Bachelor of Science degree in communication with a minor in Recreation.

=== Professional ===
He began his professional career in 2004–05 in the American Basketball Association (ABA) with the Bellevue Blackhawks, as he was the first player signed in franchise history. His career was yet again put on hold, as he suffered a broken right hand shortly after training camp. In the fall of 2005 he was invited to training camp with the Yakima Sun Kings of the Continental Basketball Association (CBA), and was the last player released before the season began.

Powell returned to the ABA for the 2005–06 season signing with the Tacoma Navigators. At the conclusion of the ABA season, he signed with the Seattle Mountaineers of the International Basketball League (IBL) and was named First Team All-IBL, IBL Western Conference All-Star (All-Star game Most Valuable Player), and number 16 in Pro Basketball News' Top 20 Minor League Players in America. In the fall of 2006 Powell was invited to a mini-camp with the Seattle SuperSonics of the National Basketball Association (NBA) prior to the start of their training camp. He then signed with the Everett Explosion of the IBL for the 2006–07 season, in which he was named to the Western Conference All-Star team.

Following the 2007 IBL season, Powell signed with Club de Deportes Provincial Llanquihue de Puerto Varas in the División Mayor del Básquetbol de Chile. From August 2007 to November 2007 he averaged 29 points per game, 11 rebounds per game, five assists per game, two steals per game, and one block per game. He led the league in virtually every statistical category, and prior to his departure, was ranked the number one player in the league. In November 2007 he returned to the United States, was invited to training camp again with the Yakama Sun Kings of the CBA, and again was the last player released prior to season. Shortly thereafter, he signed with the Albany Patroons of the CBA. Prior to the conclusion of the CBA season, Powell signed with the Sharjah Club in Sharjah, United Arab Emirates. In 2011, he played for the West Coast Hotshots in the International Basketball League.
