= Battle Creek Flight =

Sports team

- Founded: 2004
- League: IBL (2004–08); PBL (2008–09); IBL (2009–10); IBA (2011–present)
- Team history: Battle Creek Knights (2004–2013); Battle Creek Flight (2013–present)
- Based in: Battle Creek, Michigan
- Arena: Kellogg Arena; 2004–present
- Colors: Black, Silver, Orange
- Owner: Scott Niecko Co-owners: James King; Mike Lee; Mike Beck
- Head coach: Terry Sare
- Championships: 1 (2005: IBL)
- Dancers: Illegal Motion
- Mascot: Sir Jam A Lot

The Battle Creek Flight are a team in the Independent Basketball Association (IBA) located in Battle Creek, Michigan. They previously played in the Premier Basketball League (PBL) and in the International Basketball League. The team was known as the Battle Creek Knights before the 2013–14 season.

== 2005 season ==
Previous logo used from 2004 to 2013

The Knights lived up to their nickname of "The IBL's Power Team", by beating opponents by an average of 128–114. The Knights were led in scoring by Mike Williams, at 22.4 ppg. The Knights were undefeated in the regular season, and won the championship game, beating the Dayton Jets 124–121, for a final record of 21–0.

In addition to being the IBL's power team on the court, the Knights also led the league in attendance. Playing at Kellogg Arena, crowds of 2,500+ were not uncommon, and the team drew 1,854 to the championship and All-Star game, which they hosted. Three Knights made the all-star team; Bobby Madison, Jamal Gooding, and Mike Williams.

== 2006 season ==
The 2006 Knights were a victim of the IBL's expansion. The team finished 11–10, respectable, yet a far cry from being undefeated. The team lost their only playoff game 144–139 to the Holland Blast, an expansion team. Again, three all-stars were named, Logan Vander Velden, Mike Williams, and Jay Youngblood. Youngblood was also in the top 25 scorers, averaging 22.0 ppg (he also played part of the season with the Cuyahoga Falls Cougars. After the season, coach Williams resigned and was replaced by former Knight Logan Vander Velden.

== 2007 season ==
With Vander Velden at the helm, the Knights began to regain their winning ways, and locked into the 5th seed for the IBL playoffs, where they were eliminated by the defending champion Elkhart Express in the East final.

== 2008 season ==
The Knights started off with a 1–4 record, but rebounded to eventually end the regular season with a record of 9–11. The Knights opened the playoffs with a win against the Elgin Racers 116–100, only to fall to the Elkhart Express in the Eastern Conference finals 130–147.

During the off season, the Knights announced a switch to the winter playing Premier Basketball League (PBL).

== 2009 season ==
In their first year in the PBL, the Knights reeled off 12 straight wins before falling on the road to the Wilmington Sea Dawgs. They would lose only one other game and finish with a regular season record of 18–2, taking first place in the PBL's Central Division. However, after controversy in the PBL championship series against the Rochester Razorsharks, the Knights left the PBL, first announcing they were taking a year off, but later changing that to playing in the IBL for 2010.

== Current roster ==
As of December 27, 2013

Head Coach: Terry Sare

#	Pos.	Ht.	Player	Acquired	College
34	F	6'7"	Antione Lundy	2012	South Alabama
23	G	6'4"	Tihon Johnson	2012	Mountain State
5	G	6'4"	Dave Boykin	2012	Bridgeport
–	PG	5'10"	Ameer Watts	2012	Missouri Southern State
1	PG	5'10"	Marcus Lancaster	2012	Montevallo
7	F	6'5"	Corey Massey	2011	Alma
11	PG	6'2"	Ben Fuller	2012	Liberty
10	SF	6'5"	Randon Dyer	2011	Did not attend college

== 2009 season schedule ==
Date	Opponent	Score	High points	High rebounds	High assists	Location (Att.)	Record
January 2	Chicago Throwbacks	W 120–113	Rashi Johnson, Kenny Langhorne (19)	Florentino Valencia (11)	Rashi Johnson (11)	Kellogg Arena (1,257)	1–0
January 8	Wilmington Sea Dawgs	W 96–95	Kenny Langhorne (24)	Chris Gaines (9)	Rashi Johnson (6)	Kellogg Arena	2–0
January 10	at Chicago Throwbacks	W 106–94	Rashi Johnson (25)	Rashi Johnson, Chris Wesby (5)	Rashi Johnson (5)	Attack Athletics	3–0
January 17	Detroit Panthers	W 109–101	Rashi Johnson (24)	Jason Arbet, Chris Wesby (7)	Rashi Johnson (10)	Kellogg Arena	4–0
January 19	Augusta Groove	W 107–98	Florentino Valencia (18)	Florentino Valencia (11)	Rashi Johnson (10)	Kellogg Arena	5–0
January 24	at Mid-Michigan Destroyers	W 120–116	Kenny Langhorne (29)	Kenny Langhorne (10)	Jeremy File, Deon Rose, Coleco Buie, Chris Gaines, Rashi Johnson (1)	Western High School	6–0
January 31	at Detroit Panthers	W 119–106	Kenny Langhorne (23)	Jeremy File (6)	Jeremy File, Rashi Johnson (4)	Groves High School	7–0
February 5	Quebec Kebs	W 104–101	Kenny Langhorne (20)	Coleco Buie, Rashi Johnson (6)	Rashi Johnson (5)	Kellogg Arena	8–0
February 6	Chicago Throwbacks	W 117–112	Kenny Langhorne (19)	Jason Arbet (9)	Rashi Johnson (12)	Kellogg Arena	9–0
February 13	at Quebec Kebs	W 94–86	Kenny Langhorne (23)	Florentino Valencia (14)	Allen White, Frank Phillips, Jason Arbet (1)	Pavillon de la Jeunesse	10–0
February 19	Mid-Michigan Destroyers	W 131–111	Kenny Langhorne (19)	Kenny Langhorne (7)	Rashi Johnson (12)	Kellogg Arena	11–0
February 20	Detroit Panthers	W 143–133	Coleco Buie (32)	Frank Phillips (7)	Rashi Johnson (15)	Kellogg Arena	12–0
February 22	at Wilmington Sea Dawgs	L 121–117	Kenny Langhorne (21)	Rashi Johnson (7)	Frank Phillips, Rashi Johnson (5)	Schwartz Center	12–1
February 27	Buffalo Stampede	W 114–90	Kenny Langhorne (24)	Frank Phillips (10)	Rashi Johnson (7)	Kellogg Arena	13–1
March 1	at Detroit Panthers	L 110–108	Florentino Valencia (19)	Frank Phillips (9)	Jeremy File (5)	Groves High School	13–2
March 8	at Chicago Throwbacks	W 114–109	Florentino Valencia (20)	Rashi Johnson (10)	Rashi Johnson (7)	Attack Athletics	14–2
March 13	Chicago Throwbacks	W 123–120	Chris Gaines (21)	Deon Rose (10)	Rashi Johnson (7)	Kellogg Arena	15–2
March 22	at Augusta Groove	W 122–97	Kenny Langhorne (24)	Frank Phillips (7)	Jason Arbet, Frank Phillips (3)	Richmond Academy	16–2
March 27	at Chicago Throwbacks	W 121–95	Rashi Johnson (38)	Kenny Langhorne, Rashi Johnson (5)	Rashi Johnson (5)	Attack Athletics	17–2
March 28	at Buffalo Stampede	W 109–106	Kenny Langhorne (23)	Florentino Valencia (10)	Rashi Johnson (8)	Koessler Athletic Center	18–2
Playoffs; Semifinal series
April 3	at Wilmington Sea Dawgs	L 112–108	Rashi Johnson, Frank Phillips (22)	Frank Phillips (14)	Rashi Johnson (7)	Schwartz Center	18–3
April 5	Wilmington Sea Dawgs	W 111–90	Kenny Langhorne (20)	Kenny Langhorne (7)	Rashi Johnson (8)	Kellogg Arena	19–3
April 6	Wilmington Sea Dawgs	W 119–112	Rashi Johnson (24)	Frank Phillips (1)	Rashi Johnson (10)	Kellogg Arena	20–3
PBL Finals
April 19	at Rochester Razor Sharks	L 152–115	Coleco Buie (24)	Kenny Langhorne (8)	Rashi Johnson (6)	Blue Cross Arena	20–4

== Season results ==
Year	Wins	Losses	Pct.	Finish
2005	21	0	1.000	1st – East Division
2006	11	10	.524	T-5th – East Division
2007	14	9	.609	3rd – East Division
2008	10	12	.455	4th – East Division
2009	18	2	.900	1st – Central Division

2005 – IBL Champions

== All-Stars ==
=== 2005 ===
- Jamel Gooding
- Bobby Madison
- Mike Williams

=== 2006 ===
- Jamel Gooding
- Logan Vander Velden
- Jay Youngblood

=== 2007 ===
- Isaac Jefferson
- Nick Zachery

=== 2008 ===
- Bobby Madison
