= Paul Haynes (basketball) =

American basketball player (born 1982)

Personal information
- Born: 1982 (age 43–44) Auburn Hills, Michigan, U.S.
- Listed height: 6 ft 8 in (2.03 m)
- Listed weight: 215 lb (98 kg)

Career information
- High school: Pontiac Northern (Pontiac, Michigan)
- College: Grambling State (2000–2004)
- NBA draft: 2004: undrafted
- Playing career: 2004–2010
- Position: Forward

Career history
- 2004–2005: TSV Troester Breitenguessbach
- 2005–2006: Detroit Wheels
- 2006: Columbus Cyclones
- 2009–2010: Lake Michigan Admirals

Career highlights
- SWAC Player of the Year (2002); 3× First Team All-SWAC (2002–2004); SWAC Freshman of the Year (2001)

Paul Haynes (born 1982) is an American former professional basketball player. After a six-year career spanning from 2004 to 2010, Haynes retired from the sport to pursue business in the Detroit, Michigan area.

== Playing career ==
After graduating from Pontiac Northern High School in Pontiac, Michigan in 2000, Haynes attended Grambling State University to play for the Tigers. Haynes made an immediate impact as he averaged 13.9 points and 5.8 rebounds per game and was named the Southwestern Athletic Conference (SWAC) Freshman of the Year in 2001. His sophomore season in 2001–02 was his most successful. That year, he averaged career highs in points (20.2) and rebounds (8.4), finished first in the SWAC in scoring, first in double-doubles (10), second in rebounding, scored a career-high 40 points in a game and also recorded at least 20 points in 15 games. He was named the SWAC Player of the Year and became just the third Grambling State player to be honored as such. Although he never repeated as the conference's player of the year, Haynes did manage to become a three-time All-SWAC First Team member from 2002 through 2004. He finished his collegiate career with 1,958 points and 849 rebounds.

Haynes went undrafted in the 2004 NBA draft. From 2004 through 2010 he found himself playing for various semi-professional and professional basketball leagues. Haynes played in the Continental Basketball Association (Great Lakes Storm), International Basketball League (Marysville Meteors), Premier Basketball League (Detroit Panthers and Lake Michigan Admirals) as well as for TSV Troester Breitenguessbach in Germany.
