= Mark Baker (basketball) =

American basketball player and coach

Personal information
- Born: November 11, 1969 (age 57) Dayton, Ohio
- Listed height: 6 ft 1 in (1.85 m)
- Listed weight: 175 lb (79 kg)

Career information
- High school: Dunbar (Dayton, Ohio)
- College: Ohio State (1989–1992)
- NBA draft: 1992: undrafted
- Playing career: 1992–2001
- Position: Point guard
- Number: 3

Career history
- 1992–1993: Columbus Horizon
- 1993: Palm Beach Stingrays
- 1995: Long Island Surf
- 1996–1997: WBC Wels
- 1997: Atlantic City Seagulls
- 1997–1998: Basket Livorno
- 1998–1999: Grand Rapids Hoops
- 1999: Toronto Raptors
- 1999–2000: Cibona
- 2001: Florida Sea Dragons

Career highlights
- Third-team Parade All-American (1988)
- Stats at NBA.com
- Stats at Basketball Reference

LaMark Anthony Baker (born November 11, 1969) is a retired American basketball player and current coach. He is the former head coach of the Dayton Jets of the International Basketball League.

He played collegiately for the Ohio State University as point guard from 1989 to 1992. He is currently sixth in all-time assists in Ohio State history.

After graduating, he was not drafted and signed with the National Basketball Association's Charlotte Hornets, but was waived before the 1992–93 season started. Baker played two seasons in the Continental Basketball Association (CBA) for the Columbus Horizon (1992–93) and the Grand Rapids Hoops (1998–99), averaging 10.6 points and 7.2 assists per game for his CBA career. He played one game for the Toronto Raptors in the 1999 season. He also played professionally in Italy in Serie A2 for Bini Viaggi Livorno (1997–98). In 2001, he played for the Florida Sea Dragons of the USBL.
