= Jazz of Tacoma =

- League: IBL 2007–09
- Founded: 2007
- Folded: 2009
- History: Tacoma Jazz; 2007–08; Jazz of Tacoma; 2008–09
- Arena: Mount Tahoma High School; 2007–09
- Location: Tacoma, Washington
- Team colors: green, dark green, yellow
- Head coach: Dearmon Frankie
- Ownership: Dr. Antoine Johnson

The Jazz of Tacoma were a professional basketball team based in Tacoma, Washington which were members of the International Basketball League (IBL) from 2007 to 2009. This was not the first attempt at a professional basketball franchise in Tacoma. The Tacoma Thunder played for two seasons in the league and were replaced by a franchise named the Tacoma Jets. However, the Jets never played any games and were subsequently replaced by the Jazz. In 2009, the team was replaced by the Tacoma Tide.

== See also ==
- Bellingham Slam
- Olympia Reign
- Seattle Mountaineers
