= Salem Soldiers =

Basketball team

- Founded: 2005
- Folded: 2012
- League: IBL (2006–07)(2012); NABL (2010)
- Team history: Salem Stampede (2005–2011); Salem Soldiers (2012)
- Based in: Salem, Oregon
- Arena: Salem Armory; 2005–2006; Douglas McKay High School (2007–2011) Salem Hoop (2012)
- Colors: Silver and blue
- Owner: Anthony Veilz
- Head coach: Joe Becerra
- Championships: 0

The Salem Soldiers were a basketball team from Salem, Oregon that played in the International Basketball League from 2005 to 2007 and in 2012. Originally the Salem Stampede, they played home games in the Salem Armory, which seats 3,000 for basketball. In 2007 the team played home games in Salem's Douglas McKay High School. The team became the Soldiers in 2012 when they returned to the IBL, their final season, as the Salem Sabres entered the league the next year.

== Notable players ==
Notable past and present players for the Stampede include:

- Eric Fiegi — 2006 IBL scoring champion
- Antone Jarrell — all-time IBL single game scorer for points in a game (68)
- Jeff Dunn — two-time IBL All-Star
- Will Funn — 2007 IBL assist leader (14.9 per game); also the single game IBL assist record holder (27)
- Mike Tabb — 2007 ABA and IBL rebound champion
- Blake Walker — averaged over 32 ppg in 2007
- Nick DeWitz — averaged 20 points, 12 rebounds, 4 assists and 3 blocks per game in 2007
- Grayson "The Professor" Boucher of AND1 Mixtape Tour fame.
