= Bellingham Slam =

- League: ABA 2005–07; IBL 2007–14; Seattle Pro-Am 2016–present
- Founded: 2005
- History: Bellingham Slam; 2005–present
- Arena: Whatcom Pavilion
- Location: Bellingham, Washington
- Team colors: light blue, black white
- Head coach: Tyler Amaya
- Ownership: Bellingham Basketball, Inc.
- Championships: 4 (2008, 2012, 2013, 2014)

The Bellingham Slam are a semi-professional basketball team that formerly competed for seven seasons in the International Basketball League. Before joining the IBL, they played two seasons in the American Basketball Association. They were originally expected to play in Everett, Washington, but were relocated to Bellingham, Washington under the ownership of John Dominguez. The team currently competes in the annual Seattle Pro–Am basketball tournament organized by Seattle, Washington native and former National Basketball Association (NBA) player Jamal Crawford.

The head coach from 2005 to 2013 was Rob Ridnour, father of former NBA guard Luke Ridnour. On March 31, 2014, the team announced that Ridnour was stepping down as coach and former assistant Tyler Amaya was named as his replacement. In their third season of existence, the team won an IBL championship in 2008 and repeated again as league champions in 2012, 2013 and 2014. The Slam have found success by primarily utilizing lesser-known NCAA Division II players rather than Division I players. Each season the Slam's roster features several players who played collegiately in the Great Northwest Athletic Conference. They play their home games at Whatcom Pavilion on the campus of Whatcom Community College.

== History ==
=== American Basketball Association (2005–07) ===
The Slam finished their inaugural season 18–14, good for second place in the Red Conference's Ron Boone Division and a #10 seed in the playoffs. They won their first two playoff games (over the Tacoma Navigators, 134–116 in the first round and over the Pittsburgh Xplosion, 122–115 in the second round) in 2005, but lost in the Great Eight Tournament in Rochester to the San Jose SkyRockets by a score of 138–119 on March 22, 2006. The team averaged 529 fans per game, with a high of 1,078 when Dennis Rodman and the Tijuana Dragons came to Bellingham.

The Slam finished their second season 21–10, which was good for first place in the Red Conference's North Division, a #8 seed in the playoffs, and a first-round bye. They won their first playoff game 137–103 over the Hollywood Fame before losing to the Vermont Frost Heaves by a score of 119–103 in the league quarterfinals. The Slam averaged 437 fans per game, with a high of 960 coming in their home opener.

=== International Basketball League (2007–2014) ===
The Slam finished their first season in the International Basketball League and third overall with a 19–4 record, winning the West Division during the regular season's final weekend. At the Western Conference Tournament at the Monroe Sports Arena, they received a first round bye, won their conference semi-final game 129–101 over the Edmonton Chill, and won their conference final game over the Vancouver Volcanoes 120–106.

The Slam hosted the 2008 IBL Championship Game against the Elkhart Express at Whatcom Pavilion on July 18. Bellingham defeated Elkhart 118–111 in front of a sell-out crowd of 1,100 to claim their first championship.,. With the championship game included, the Slam set a franchise record of 621 fans per game.

The Slam were unable to repeat as IBL Champions in 2009, as they were defeated in the third round of the playoffs by the eventual champions, the Los Angeles Lightning. The Slam reached the third round by finishing the regular season first in the IBL's North Division with a 16–4 record and earning a first round bye in the playoffs. Bellingham defeated the Tacoma Tide in the second round, 116–111, before losing to Los Angeles 132–121. With their two playoff games included, the Slam finished the 2009 season with a 17–5 record. The 2009 season also saw the Slam's home court winning streak of 19 games broken in their season opener to the Seattle Mountaineers, although following the loss the Slam went on to win their remaining nine home games. The Slam averaged 524 fans per home game and 240 fans per road game in 2009.

The Bellingham Slam made a playoff run defeating the Los Angeles Lightning in the Second Round, 112–94, and the Yamhill Highflyers in the Conference Final, 136–105. Then, on July 16, the Slam played the Albany Legends in the Championship Game and suffered a 126–111 loss. The Slam finished the regular season with a record of 13–7 and with the playoffs included, they had a 15–8 record. The Bellingham Slam allowed an average of 105.8 points per game during their fifth season.

The Slam opened the 2011 season with a three-game win streak and finished the season with a 14–6 record. They had three different three game win streaks throughout the season. The Bellingham Slam had a solid regular season but then on July 2, they went to Vancouver, WA, and played the Vancouver Volcanoes. They suffered a 105–96 loss in the Semi-Finals of the International Basketball League Playoffs. During the 2011 season, the Slam set the record for most points in a single game with 179 points against the Kankakee Soldiers on June 26. They also set the team record for free throw percentage with 77% shooting on the year.

The Bellingham Slam finished their seventh season with an overall record of 17–3. The Slam finished the regular season with a 14–3 record, including an eleven-game win streak. They defeated the Vancouver Volcanoes 127–98 in the Semi-Finals of the IBL Playoffs and finished the season by defeating the Portland Chinooks, 142–109. This victory gave the Slam their second IBL Championship. Three players on the Bellingham Slam, as well as their head coach, received end-of-season league accolades. Morris Anderson received the Defensive Player of the Year award and Paul Hafford earned the IBL's Most Improved Player award. Also, Rod Ridnour, the Slam's head coach, was named the league's Coach of the Year.

The Bellingham Slam finished the 2013 regular season with a 16–2 record, their best winning percentage in team history, and won consecutive IBL titles for the first time in league history, defeating the Vancouver Volcanoes in the championship game, 117–114. Morris Anderson, Blake Poole and Jacob Stevenson were named IBL All-Stars for the 2013 season.

Despite a slow start to the season, the Bellingham Slam once again finished first in the IBL with a 13–3 regular season record, which included a record-tying 12 game winning streak. In the 2014 IBL Championship game, the Slam dominated the Vancouver Volcanoes on their home floor, winning 143–126, to capture their third straight league title. Austin Bragg was named the game's MVP with 27 points and 12 rebounds. For the second straight season, the trio of Morris Anderson, Blake Poole and Jacob Stevenson were named 2014 IBL All-Stars.

On February 16, 2015, the Slam announced that the team would be suspending operations.

=== Seattle Pro–Am summer league (2016–present) ===
After a one-year hiatus, the Slam returned to action by accepting an invitation to compete in the Seattle Pro-Am summer league, organized by NBA veteran and Seattle native Jamal Crawford.

The team finished their first season in the Seattle Pro-Am with a 7–3 record and reached the semi-finals of the playoffs. Paul Hafford finished as the Slam's leading scorer with 22.4 points per game, and Anye Turner was the leading rebounds with 10.5 rebounds per game. Hafford was selected to compete in the 2016 Seattle Pro-Am All-Star game on August 14, 2016.

== See also ==
- Bellingham Mariners
