= Las Vegas Stars =

Las Vegas Stars is a professional sports team nickname that can refer to:

- Las Vegas Stars (baseball), a Minor League Baseball team of the Pacific Coast League from 1983 to 2000
- Las Vegas Stars (USBL), a minor league basketball team of the United States Basketball League
