= Cedric Ceballos =

American basketball player (born 1969)

Personal information
- Born: August 2, 1969 (age 57) Maui, Hawaii, U.S.
- Listed height: 6 ft 7 in (2.01 m)
- Listed weight: 220 lb (100 kg)

Career information
- High school: Dominguez (Compton, California)
- College: Ventura (1986–1988); Cal State Fullerton (1988–1990)
- NBA draft: 1990: 2nd round, 48th overall pick
- Drafted by: Phoenix Suns
- Playing career: 1990–2011
- Position: Small forward
- Number: 23, 1

Career history
- 1990–1994: Phoenix Suns
- 1994–1997: Los Angeles Lakers
- 1997–1998: Phoenix Suns
- 1998–2000: Dallas Mavericks
- 2000: Detroit Pistons
- 2000–2001: Miami Heat
- 2002: Las Vegas Slam
- 2002: Harlem Globetrotters
- 2002: Hapoel Tel Aviv
- 2002–2003: Lokomotiv Mineralnye Vody
- 2003: Sioux Falls Skyforce
- 2003–2004: San Miguel Beermen
- 2004–2005: Los Angeles Stars
- 2005–2007: Orange County / Maywood Buzz
- 2007: Phoenix Flame
- 2008–2011: Maywood Buzz

Career highlights
- NBA All-Star (1995); NBA Slam Dunk Contest champion (1992); 2× First-team All-Big West (1989, 1990)

Career statistics
- Points: 8,693 (14.3 ppg)
- Rebounds: 3,258 (5.3 rpg)
- Assists: 723 (1.2 apg)
- Stats at NBA.com
- Stats at Basketball Reference

Cedric Zelos Ceballos (born August 2, 1969) is an American former professional basketball player. As a small forward, he played mostly for the Phoenix Suns and the Los Angeles Lakers, later finishing his National Basketball Association (NBA) career with the Dallas Mavericks, Detroit Pistons, and Miami Heat.

== Playing career ==
Ceballos attended college at Ventura College and later Cal State Fullerton.

Ceballos' career highlights include winning the NBA Slam Dunk Contest with a blindfolded dunk in 1992. He also led the NBA in field goal percentage (57.6) in 1992–93 with the Suns. Ceballos played a major role for the Suns during the playoffs, leading the team to a Western Conference Finals Game 1 victory over the Seattle SuperSonics with a team high 21 points. After beating Seattle in a seven-game series, the Suns reached the Finals, where they lost to the Chicago Bulls. Ceballos went on to play for the Los Angeles Lakers after being traded in 1994 for a first-round draft pick, where he led the Lakers in scoring in 1994–95 with a 21.7 average and made the All-Star team, but could not participate due to an injury. That season, on December 20, 1994, he set a career high with 50 points scored, including a three-point shot to secure the win with 5.7 seconds left, in a game against the Minnesota Timberwolves. The following season, on December 3, 1995, Ceballos recorded 19 points and a career high six steals in a 104–96 victory over the Indiana Pacers. That year, he again led the Lakers with a 21.2 scoring average.

This fell to just 10.8 points per game in a mere 8 games in 1996-1997. Prior to the 1996-1997 season, Ceballos was traded back to the Phoenix Suns, alongside Rumeal Robinson, for Robert Horry and Joe Kleine, starting just 32 of 42 games and scoring 15.6 points per game; it would be the most starts over the last 7 years of his career. In 1998, Ceballos was traded to the Dallas Mavericks for Dennis Scott. In 2000, Ceballos was traded to the Detroit Pistons with John Wallace and Eric Murdock for Christian Laettner and Terry Mills. Ceballos would only appear in thirteen games for Detroit before being traded to the Miami Heat with two second-round draft picks for a single second-round pick. In 2001, Ceballos attempted to sign with the Denver Nuggets but was cut.

In 2002, Ceballos signed with Israeli team Hapoel Tel Aviv, but was waived after a couple of games. Shortly afterward, he moved to Russia and was signed by BC Lokomotiv Mineralnye Vody. Ceballos also played for the San Miguel Beermen in the Philippine Basketball Association (PBA).

In late 2004, Ceballos signed with the Los Angeles Stars from the ABA. He later became employed by the Suns as their in-arena emcee and host of a weekly webcast, "Nothin' but Net". Ceballos also hosted a morning music program for Phoenix, Arizona rhythm & blues radio station MEGA 104.3 FM.

In March 2007, the Phoenix Flame of the IBL announced the signing of Ceballos for its inaugural season in the league, but he quickly moved behind the lines as an assistant coach the next month.

Ceballos has toured with the "USA Legends". On June 19, 2011, the USA Legends defeated the Indonesian NBL All Star team 97–79, with Ceballos being the unofficial MVP of the game. A notable highlight of Ceballos' performance during the game was when he donned one of the Indonesian player's jerseys and played for the Indonesian team over a stretch of a few possessions, scoring a breakaway dunk during one of them.

Ceballos later became part owner of the American Basketball Association's Arizona Scorpions, and also played for the team.

== Personal life ==
Ceballos was invited to play for the Mexico national basketball team in the 1992 Summer Olympics. He is also a second cousin of his former Lakers teammate Kobe Bryant as their grandfathers were brothers.

In 2011, Ceballos suffered "a series of small heart attacks", as described by his publicist. Ceballos successfully recovered by undergoing an angioplasty with two stents placed in his heart.

In 2021, Ceballos contracted COVID-19 and posted photos of himself in the intensive care unit. On September 13, he tweeted that he was free of COVID, but was still having difficulty breathing and walking.

== In media ==
In 1996, Ceballos made a guest appearance on the PBS children's series The Puzzle Place. The following year, he played himself on an episode of Living Single titled "High Anxiety". In 1998, Ceballos was a guest panelist on the Nickelodeon game show Figure It Out.

Ceballos also worked on the album titled B-Ball's Best Kept Secret, a 1994 record featuring tracks of an array of early 1990s NBA players. He is featured on multiple tracks performing with hip-hop star Warren G on "Flow On" and later on the track "Ya Don't Stop" also featuring fellow NBA All-Star Dana Barros and rappers Grand Puba, Sadat X, AG, and Diamond D.

Ceballos appeared along with Shawn Marion in the 30th season of The Amazing Race. They finished in ninth place out of 11 teams, having raced a total of four legs.

== NBA career statistics ==
Legend
GP	Games played	GS	Games started	MPG	Minutes per game
FG%	Field goal percentage	3P%	3-point field goal percentage	FT%	Free throw percentage
RPG	Rebounds per game	APG	Assists per game	SPG	Steals per game
BPG	Blocks per game	PPG	Points per game	**Bold**	Career high
*	Led the league

=== Regular season ===
Year	Team	GP	GS	MPG	FG%	3P%	FT%	RPG	APG	SPG	BPG	PPG
1990–91	Phoenix	63	0	11.6	.487	.167	.663	2.4	0.6	0.2	0.1	8.2
1991–92	Phoenix	64	4	11.3	.482	.167	.736	2.4	0.8	0.3	0.2	7.2
1992–93	Phoenix	74	46	21.7	**.576***	.000	.725	5.5	1.0	0.7	0.4	12.8
1993–94	Phoenix	53	43	30.2	.535	.000	.724	6.5	1.7	1.1	0.4	19.1
1994–95	L.A. Lakers	58	54	**35.0**	.509	**.397**	.716	**8.0**	1.8	1.0	0.3	**21.7**
1995–96	L.A. Lakers	**78**	**71**	33.7	.530	.277	.804	6.9	1.5	**1.2**	0.3	21.2
1996–97	L.A. Lakers	8	8	34.9	.410	.238	.867	6.6	1.9	0.6	**0.8**	10.8
1996–97	Phoenix	42	32	27.3	.464	.259	.737	6.6	1.2	0.7	0.4	15.3
1997–98	Phoenix	35	16	17.9	.500	.300	.714	4.3	1.0	0.6	0.2	9.5
1997–98	Dallas	12	9	30.3	.478	.300	.770	6.0	**2.1**	0.9	0.7	16.9
1998–99	Dallas	13	5	27.1	.421	.393	.694	6.5	0.9	0.5	0.4	12.5
1999–00	Dallas	69	25	29.9	.446	.328	.843	6.7	1.3	0.8	0.3	16.6
2000–01	Detroit	13	0	12.8	.394	.275	.800	2.0	0.5	0.5	0.2	5.8
2000–01	Miami	27	0	14.6	.462	.333	**.879**	3.0	0.5	0.4	0.1	6.9
Career		609	313	24.2	.500	.309	.753	5.3	1.2	0.7	0.3	14.3

=== Playoffs ===
Year	Team	GP	GS	MPG	FG%	3P%	FT%	RPG	APG	SPG	BPG	PPG
1991	Phoenix	3	0	8.0	**.583**	–	.333	1.7	0.7	0.7	0.0	5.3
1992	Phoenix	8	8	23.5	.550	–	.667	6.4	1.5	0.8	**0.8**	13.5
1993	Phoenix	**16**	3	11.6	.571	–	.727	2.3	0.8	0.3	0.4	6.0
1994	Phoenix	10	8	21.2	.462	.000	.833	4.4	0.8	0.8	0.2	10.1
1995	L.A. Lakers	10	**10**	34.0	.381	**.360**	.737	6.1	**1.8**	**1.2**	0.7	14.2
1996	L.A. Lakers	4	4	**35.5**	.484	.313	.917	**8.3**	1.3	1.0	0.3	**19.0**
1997	Phoenix	5	0	21.4	.333	.250	**1.000**	5.2	0.6	0.8	0.6	6.6
2001	Miami	3	0	5.0	.286	–	.500	2.0	0.3	0.0	0.0	1.7
Career		59	33	20.6	.466	.325	.743	4.5	1.1	0.7	0.4	9.8
