= Chico Force =

Franchise in International Basketball League in California, USA

- Founded: 2004
- League: IBL 2004-2007
- Team history: Chico Force; 2004-2007
- Based in: Chico, California
- Arena: Chico High School; 2007
- Colors: Red and black
- Owner: Bryan Buck, Skip Riley, and Dan Rodrigues
- Head coach: Ron DuBois
- Championships: None

The Chico Force were a franchise in the International Basketball League based in Chico, California. The team was highly successful in their first season, sporting a 13–7 record, second in the west and 1/2 games behind the Tacoma Thunder. The Force are coached by Ron Dubois, and the team's 2005 leading scorer was Chris Gonzalez, who tied for 22nd in the league with 20.2 ppg.

The Force played their initial season at Pleasant Valley High School. In 2006, games will be played at Marsh Junior High School.

== Season by season ==
Regular Season
Year	Wins	Losses	Percentage	Division
2005	13	7	.650	2nd - West Division
2006	9	9	.500	T-6th - West Division
2007	4	14	.222	5th - Southwest Division

== All-Stars ==
=== 2005 ===
- Will Bonner
- Chris Gonzalez
- Ed Madec

=== 2006 ===
- Franco Harris
- Jason VanEck

=== 2007 ===
- Tyree Jones
