= Arizona Veterans Memorial Coliseum =

Multi-purpose indoor arena in Phoenix, Arizona, U.S.

- "The Madhouse on McDowell"
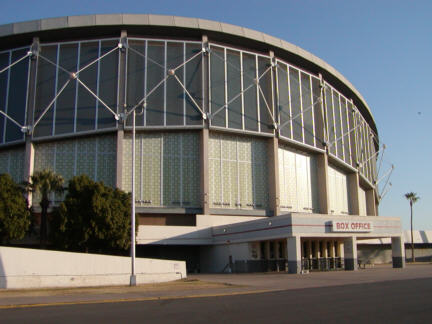
- Interactive map of Arizona Veterans Memorial Coliseum
- Address: 1826 West McDowell Road
- Location: Phoenix, Arizona
- Coordinates: 33°28′10″N 112°5′48″W
- Owner: Arizona Exposition and State Fair Board
- Operator: Arizona Exposition and State Fair Board
- Capacity: Basketball: 14,870; Ice hockey: 13,730

Construction
- Groundbreaking: August 11, 1964
- Opened: November 3, 1965
- Cost: US$7 million
- Architects: Lescher & Mahoney; Place & Place
- Structural engineer: T. Y. Lin International
- General contractor: Manhattan–Dickman

Tenants
- Phoenix Roadrunners (WHL) (1967–1974); Phoenix Suns (NBA) (1968–1992); Phoenix Roadrunners (WHA) (1974–1977); Phoenix Racquets (WTT) (1975–1978); Phoenix Roadrunners (PHL) (1977–1979); Phoenix Inferno (MISL) (1980–1984); Phoenix Roadrunners (IHL) (1989–1997); Phoenix Cobras (RHI) (1994–1995); Phoenix Mustangs (WCHL) (1997–2001); Arizona Thunder (WISL) (1998–2000); Phoenix Eclipse (ABA) (2001–2002); Phoenix Flame (IBL) (2007); Arizona Derby Dames (2009–present)

Arizona Veterans Memorial Coliseum, also called the Madhouse Coliseum or Phoenix Memorial Coliseum, is a 14,870-seat multi-purpose indoor arena in Phoenix, Arizona, United States, located at the Arizona State Fairgrounds. It hosted the Phoenix Suns of the National Basketball Association from 1968 to 1992, as well as indoor soccer, professional roller hockey, multiple professional minor league ice hockey teams, and roller derby.

== History ==
The Arizona State Fair Commission began planning an "Arizona State Fairgrounds Exposition Center" as early as February 1960. The Commission envisioned an indoor facility which could be used during the state fair as well as year-round. In 1964, Phoenix architect Leslie Mahoney, of the firm Lescher and Mahoney (designers of the Orpheum Theatre in downtown Phoenix) presented the final plans to the commission, and construction began that summer. Tucson architect Lew Place (son of University of Arizona chief campus architect Roy Place, who later took over his father's firm) was also involved in the design. The structural engineering firm was T. Y. Lin International.

The distinctive saddle-shaped, tension-cable roof, supporting over 1,000 precast concrete panels, was considered innovative architectural engineering. It may have been at least partially influenced by the equally innovative Dorton Arena at the North Carolina State Fair in Raleigh, completed in 1952. Veterans Memorial Coliseum contains a series of murals by Phoenix artist Paul Coze. The design influenced later arenas' architecture, including the defunct Capital Centre in Landover, Maryland, and the Scotiabank Saddledome in Calgary, Alberta.

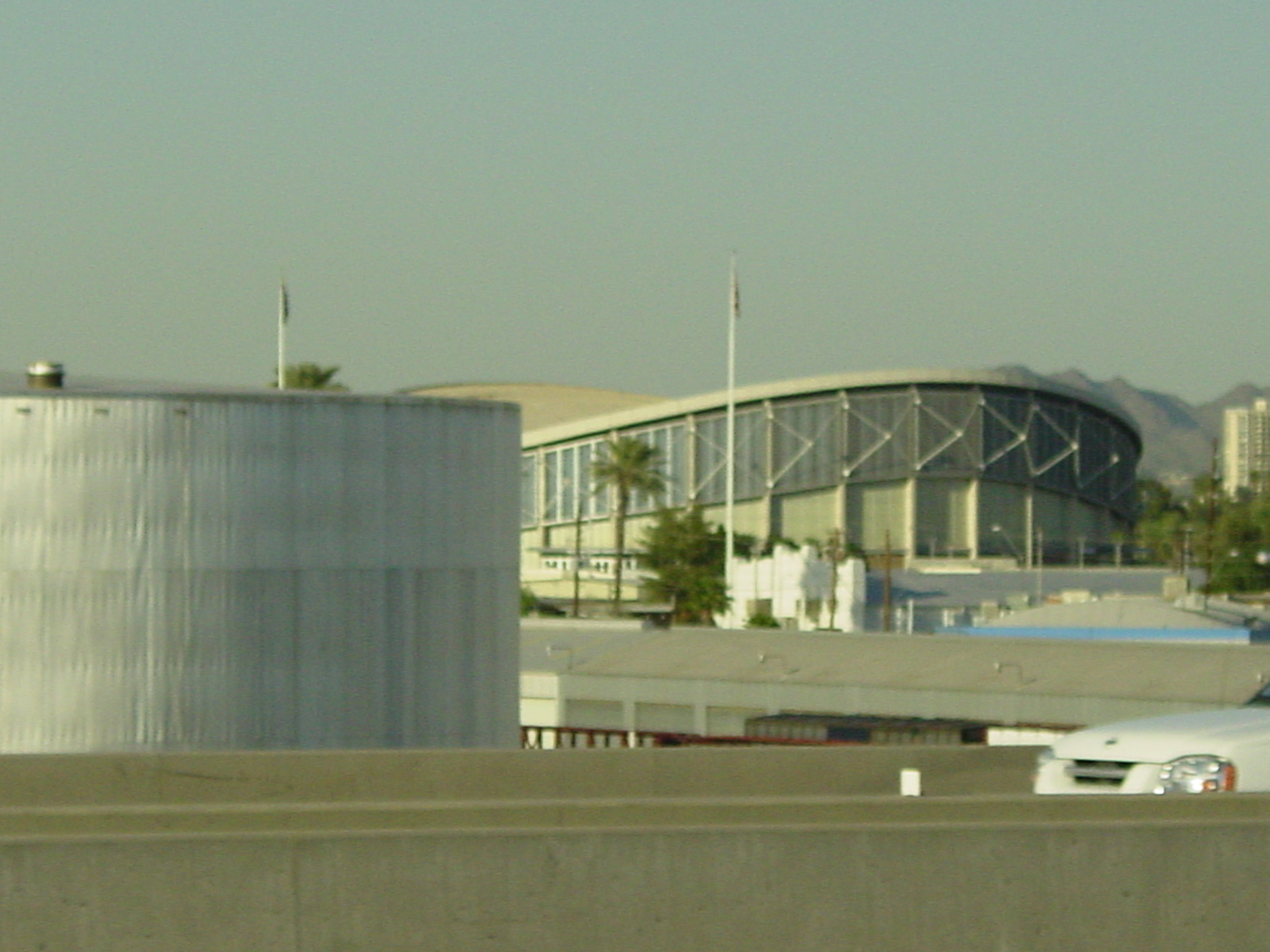
The Coliseum in 2007

In April 1965, the name was changed to honor Arizona's war veterans. There was an early controversy over whether alcohol would be served at the new facility, but legislation was signed in April 1965 by Governor Sam Goddard providing for limited liquor sales. The Coliseum opened November 3, 1965, with a production of Ice Follies. The final cost was estimated at $7 million, all privately funded.

The Coliseum suffers from a leaky roof dating back to at least its first anniversary, when management put a 25-foot (7.6 m) candle on the roof to celebrate the building's first birthday. The candle broke the roof's seal, which caused a number of leaks over the years.

=== Concerts ===
On January 21, 1967, The Monkees performed at the Coliseum on their first ever live tour, which was filmed and portions used in episode 4753, "The Monkees on Tour". The episode first aired on NBC, April 24, 1967, and included footage of the band's stay at Mountain Shadows Resort. On November 11, 1969, The Rolling Stones played a show for their Let it Bleed tour at the Coliseum. On September 9, 1970, Elvis Presley kicked off his first tour after returning to live performing, to a sell-out crowd of 13,000 as he did his first tour of 1973 on April 22 in front of 15,000. On October 18, 1993, Nirvana kicked off their In Utero world tour with a sold-out concert at the Coliseum.

=== Basketball ===
The arena hosted the Phoenix Suns of the NBA from 1968 to 1992. During the Suns' tenure, the Coliseum was affectionately referred to as "The Madhouse on McDowell" (for McDowell Road on which the arena is located) by both fans and the local media. Ironically, it was Lakers broadcaster Chick Hearn who conferred the nickname during the 1970 playoffs. The first home game for the Suns at the arena took place on October 18, 1968, a 116–107 win against the Seattle SuperSonics.

A preseason game against the Portland Trail Blazers had to be canceled on October 6, 1974, after a leaky roof rendered the floor unplayable.

The Coliseum hosted the 1975 NBA All-Star Game, and the Boston Celtics won the NBA championship there in 1976.

The last regular season home game for the Suns at the arena took place on April 16, 1992, a 101–121 loss to the Portland Trail Blazers. The final Suns home game at the arena took place on May 11, 1992 during the playoffs, a 151–153 double overtime loss to the Trail Blazers in the second round.

Due to renovations at Talking Stick Resort Arena (now Mortgage Matchup Center), the WNBA's Phoenix Mercury was to play at the Coliseum for the 2020 season, though the COVID-19 pandemic moved the Mercury to a league-wide bubble environment at IMG Academy in Bradenton, Florida.

== Seating capacity ==
Seating capacity for basketball went as follows:

Years	Capacity
1965–1971	12,371
1971–1975	12,534
1975–1976	13,036
1976–1977	13,274
1977–1981	12,660
1981–1985	14,660
1985–1987	14,519
1987–1989	14,471
1989–1991	14,487
1991–1992	14,496

== Tenants ==
This arena seats 13,730 for ice hockey and 14,870 for basketball. In addition to the Suns, the Coliseum hosted the Phoenix Roadrunners of the Western Hockey League from 1967 to 1974 and the WHA from 1974 to 1977 and of the now-defunct International Hockey League from 1989 to 1997, the Phoenix Racquets of World Team Tennis from 1975 to 1978, the Arizona Thunder of the World Indoor Soccer League from 1998 to 2000, and the Phoenix Mustangs of the now-defunct WCHL from 1997 to 2001. The Coliseum was again home to pro sports starting in 2006, when the IBL's Phoenix Flame played home games there until their move to Grand Canyon University.

The Coliseum hosted the Arizona Derby Dames banked track roller derby league from 2008 to 2015.

The arena hosted truck pulling sanctioned by USHRA in the late 1980s. It was frequently featured on USHRA's truck pulling series on ESPN.

The Coliseum also housed the Phoenix Inferno (also known as the Phoenix Pride) of the MISL from 1980 to 1984.

The Coliseum also hosted a Saturday Night's Main Event taping on Feb. 15, 1986 (shown on NBC on March 1, 1986), when King Kong Bundy attacked Hulk Hogan at the end of his title defense versus Magnificent Muraco. Hogan suffered (kayfabe) rib injuries, setting up their steel cage main event match at WrestleMania 2.

It hosted the WCW WrestleWar 1991. The Coliseum was also host to the Phoenix Mustangs hockey team as part of the West Coast Hockey League and the Phoenix Eclipse ABA basketball team.

The arena remains open for some events, even though the Suns left in 1992 for America West Arena (now Mortgage Matchup Center), schedules concerts, comedy shows and other events in the Coliseum during the Fair's annual season (which begins each October). For several years, it hosted portions of Arizona's high school basketball championships; those were moved to the newer Gila River Arena (now Desert Diamond Arena) in 2005 and returned to the Coliseum for 2020.

In the fall of 2005, the Coliseum sheltered up to 2,500 evacuees from New Orleans in the wake of Hurricane Katrina. The evacuees were relocated to other housing in time for the opening of the Fair that October.

The Coliseum most recently hosted Sam Smith on his In The Lonely Hour Tour in the summer of 2015. The Phoenix Suns returned to the Veterans Memorial Coliseum for a pre-season scrimmage on October 3, 2015, as a part of their "We Are PHX" movement, as well as unveiled signs commemorating the 50th anniversary of the Coliseum's existence.

In the late spring and early summer of 2021, the Coliseum was the site of the controversial multi-month audit of Maricopa County's 2020 presidential election ballots by the Republican caucus of the state Senate.

The Phoenix Union High School District holds its high school graduation ceremonies for all its schools each May at the Coliseum.

== See also ==
- Dorton Arena
- Capital Centre
- London Velopark
- Scotiabank Saddledome
- Hyperboloid structure
- Tensile architecture
- Thin-shell structure

== Sources ==
- The Arizona Republic: May 28, 1964; April 20, 1965
- The Phoenix Gazette: April 24, 1963; March 27, 1965; October 28, 1966
- Arizona Journal: November 14, 1962

Events and tenants
Preceded by first arena	Home of the Phoenix Roadrunners; 1967–1977	Succeeded by last arena
Preceded by first arena	Home of the Phoenix Suns; 1968–1992	Succeeded by America West Arena
Preceded by Seattle Center Coliseum	Host of the NBA All-Star Game; 1975	Succeeded by The Spectrum
