= Whatcom Pavilion =

Sports arena in Bellingham, Washington

Coordinates: 48°47′43″N 122°29′38″W

- Location in Washington Location in the United States
- Address: 233 W Kellogg Rd, Bellingham, WA 98226
- Location: Bellingham, Washington
- Owner: Whatcom Community College
- Operator: Tyler Gilmore
- Capacity: 1,200
- Surface: Ice Rink / Wood, Maple, Parquetry

Construction
- Opened: 1995
- Renovated: 2014, 2018,
- Expanded: 2018
- Cost: $31.6 million
- Project manager: Stan Jaworowski
- Main contractor: Seattle-Based SRG Partnership

Tenants
- WCC Orcas (NWAC); Bellingham Slam (ABA/IBL) (2005–2014)

Website
- Venue Website

Whatcom Pavilion is a 1,200 seat multi-purpose arena located in Bellingham, Washington, United States on the campus of Whatcom Community College. It is home to the Whatcom Community College Orcas and was the home of the Bellingham Slam of the International Basketball League,.
