= Hara Arena =

Multi-purpose arena in Ohio, United States

- Trotwood Dome
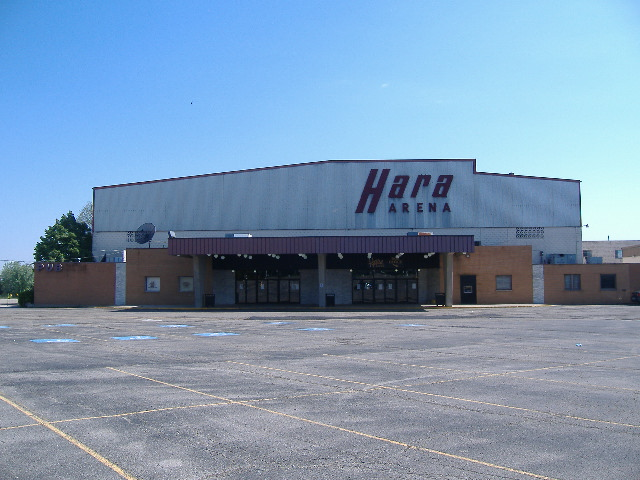
- Interactive map of Hara Arena
- Location: 1001 Shiloh Springs Road; Trotwood, Ohio 45415
- Coordinates: 39°49′16″N 84°15′22″W
- Capacity: 5,500 permanent seats 1,500 additional festival seats
- Surface: Concrete/Ice
- Field size: Ice surface: 195 × 84 ft (59 × 26 m)

Construction
- Opened: October 27, 1964
- Closed: August 27, 2016
- Demolished: September 25, 2020 - February 12, 2021

Tenants
- Dayton Gems (IHL) (1964–1977, 1979–1980); Dayton Dynamo (AISA) (1988–1990); Dayton Jets (IBL) (2005); The Marshals (NIFL) (2007); Dayton Gems (IHL/CHL) (2009–2012); Dayton Silverbacks (CIFL) (2011–2012); Dayton Demonz (FHL) (2012–2015); Gem City Rollergirls (WFTDA) (2012–2014); Dayton Sharks (CIFL) (2013–2014); Dayton Demolition (FHL) (2015–2016)

Website
- www.haracomplex.com

Hara Arena was a 5,500-seat multi-purpose arena located largely in the Trotwood, Ohio suburb of Dayton and partly in the Harrison Township suburb. The facility began as a ballroom in 1957, added an arena in 1964 and grew to a six-building complex which closed in August 2016.

At various times, it hosted the Dayton Jets basketball team and Dayton Gems (1964–1977, 1979–1980 and 2009–2012), Dayton Blue Hawks, Dayton Demonz, Megacity Hockey Club, Dayton Dynamo, Dayton Demolition ice hockey teams and the Marshals, Dayton Silverbacks, and Dayton Sharks indoor football teams.

== History ==
The site was originally the family-owned fruit orchard of Harold and Ralph Wampler. In 1957, the Wamplers opened their new ballroom called Wampler's Ball-Arena. The structure was built one-half mile northwest of the Wampler barn off Shiloh Spring Road. The venue was large enough to accommodate 3,000 dancers. It was the third dance hall the Wamplers built. The first one was destroyed by fire and a second one was built in its place on the Wampler's fruit farm.

Wampler's Hara Arena was opened with the Dayton Gems ice hockey team hosting an exhibition game against the Toledo Blades on October 27, 1964. The name Hara stems from the first two letters of Harold and Ralph's name. Both of the arena's founders were Shriners, and originally founded the venue after realizing that there was nowhere suitable in the area to hold the Shrine Circus. The original plans did not include an ice rink but were changed to accommodate the Dayton Gems who were looking for a home arena. As of 2016, the complex spanned 165,000 square feet (15,300 m^{2}) which includes the main arena, four exhibition halls, a conference center, a pub and a golf course. The Arena regularly used the slogan in advertising "Nowhere Else But Hara."

On July 29, 2016, it was announced that the facility would close after hosting a final event on August 27, 2016, due to ongoing financial issues and a 20-year long legal fight over the unresolved estate of founder Harold Wampler. At the time of the closure announcement, the facility was said to have a $36 million annual impact to the area. The closure forced events, like the annual Dayton Hamvention, to search for an alternative venue. It also forced the Dayton Demolition ice hockey team to cease operations after only one season. Prior to its closure, the Arena was said to have had a parking lot filled with potholes and not received any significant update since 1975.

As of March 2018, the property had been abandoned for over a year and a half, at times vandalized and broken into. In December 2017, PNC Bank foreclosed on the property, seeking to collect on $350,000 owed to the bank. It was reported that many had called Trotwood's government with ideas for the property, which had a list price of $775,000, but anyone seeking to acquire the property would need a "specific plan for the complicated situation of 'well over $1 million' in taxes that are due, and the multiple parcels of land and arena." In April 2018, YouTube video from a self-described "local explorer" illicitly entering the arena showed disrepair and deteriorating conditions. The city of Trotwood had made attempts to secure the property, but with limited success, and it was reported to have hundreds of code violations.

On May 2, 2018, it was revealed that the property was purchased by Michael Heitz, a developer based in Louisville, Kentucky. Heitz stated that he had bought the income tax liens from Montgomery County and hoped to close on further liens with the banks later in the week. Heitz stated that his first priority was to clean up the site and secure the property. He is known for purchasing other distressed properties within the area and getting them shovel ready for users.

On February 25, 2019, at least three individuals were arrested for breaking into the property in an attempt to steal air conditioning parts.

On the night of May 27–28, 2019, the property suffered extensive damage when tornadoes and severe storms moved through the area. The roof and sides of the structure were blown off in several places. In response, Heitz stated that he was cautiously optimistic that the building could be salvaged, but if not, it would have to be demolished. He noted that much of the main arena looked fine and that the metal which had been lost could be replaced and likely needed to be replaced anyway. He also stated that he had recently secured a grant to conduct a phase 2 environmental study of the site, with the possibility of selling the building to another buyer, which would bring new jobs to the area.

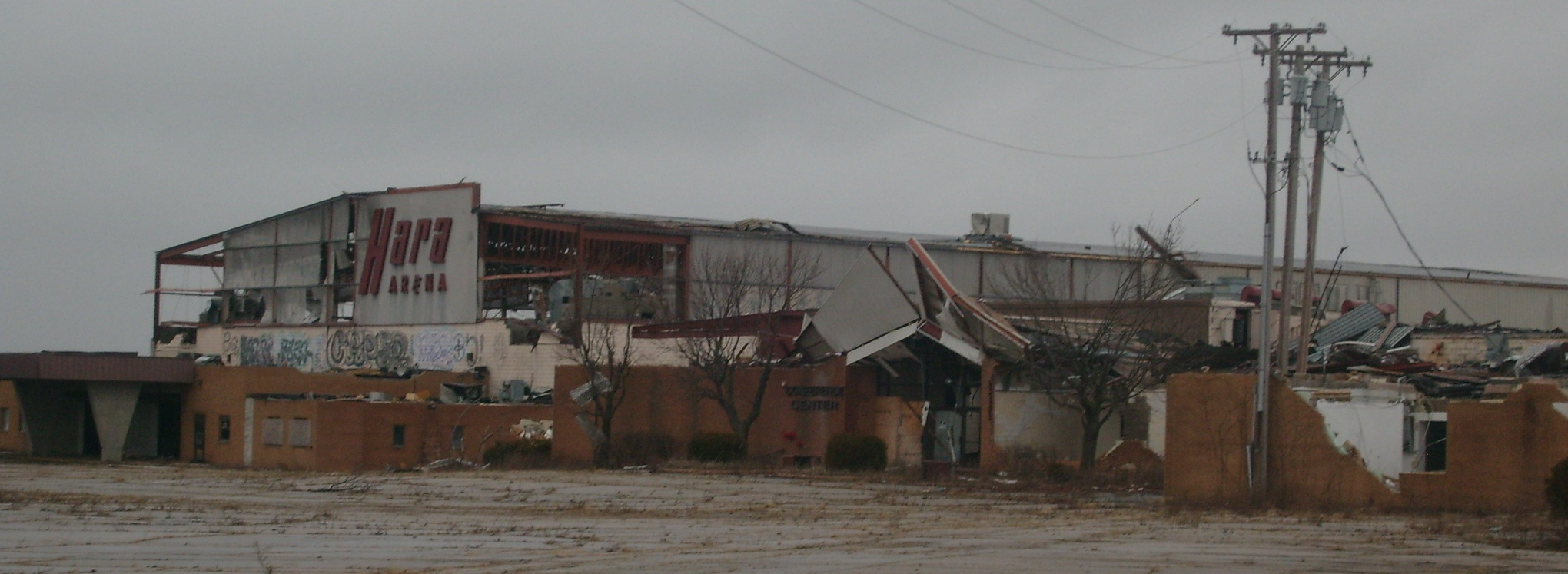
Hara Arena, December 31, 2019, badly damaged by an EF4 tornado and tagged with graffiti

In October 2019, it was reported the existing facility would not be able to be salvaged due to the already existing damage having been compounded by the tornado. The owners planned to request rezoning from entertainment to commercial in order to attract interest that would aid the facility's cleanup and redevelopment. It was estimated that the facility suffered $7.5 million in damages, the most for any property in the Montgomery County area.

In March 2020, it was announced the property had been rezoned and that demolition was likely to start soon. However, it was unclear how any such plans might be affected by the increased restrictions and financial difficulties put in place shortly afterwards due to the COVID-19 pandemic.

In May 2020, Heitz revealed that a multi-million dollar NASDAQ corporation was interested in the plot and could bring at least 50 new jobs to the area. He and the client planned to present a plan for construction to Trotwood in late July, with demolition to start immediately if the plan was approved.

In September 2020, Trotwood officially announced plans to demolish the arena and rezone the land.

In November 2020, it was announced that the lettering from the arena's iconic sign as well as bricks from the arena would be auctioned for charity. Heitz said that his company had hoped to salvage seating from the building, but was unable due to mold damage from the tornado.

In 2025, it was reported that the state of Ohio was planning to purchase the property with the intent to build a Forensic Mental Health Facility. The plan was supported by Harrison Township, on which approximately one third of the property lies, but objected to by the City Council of Trotwood, which stated they felt the project does not align with their vision for economic revitalization, job creation, and quality of life improvements for the city. In November 2025, despite reports that the funding had been obtained to move forward with the project, Trotwood mayor Yvette F. Page stated at a town hall that she would not give up fighting against the project until they started digging up dirt. Nevertheless, it was reported in January 2026 that the state of Ohio had purchased the property, with the intent to begin work within the next few months and a projected opening date sometime in 2030.

=== Championship Teams at Hara ===
- 1968–69 Dayton Gems
- 1969–70 Dayton Gems
- 1975–76 Dayton Gems
- 2013–14 Dayton Demonz

== Professional wrestling ==
Hara was the scene every other Monday night in the 1960s and 1970s for the "Original" Big Time Wrestling, featuring such stars as the Sheik, Bobo Brazil, Fred and Bull Curry, Igor, Mark Lewin, Ox Baker, and many other wrestling stars. Hara also hosted Georgia Championship Wrestling in 1983 and 1984. It also hosted a WWF Superstars of Wrestling TV taping in March, 1987, a WWF Wrestling Challenge taping in August, 1988, and the Pay-Per-View events as follows: the 1995 WCW Great American Bash, WCW/NWO Souled Out (1998), and ECW's Heat Wave (1998) and Heat Wave (1999). Hara Arena was known as being "legendary" for wrestling, with the WWF's first show at the Arena featuring the famed André the Giant. The Sheik held his first event at Hara Arena in 1965, just one year after its opening.

== Notable events ==
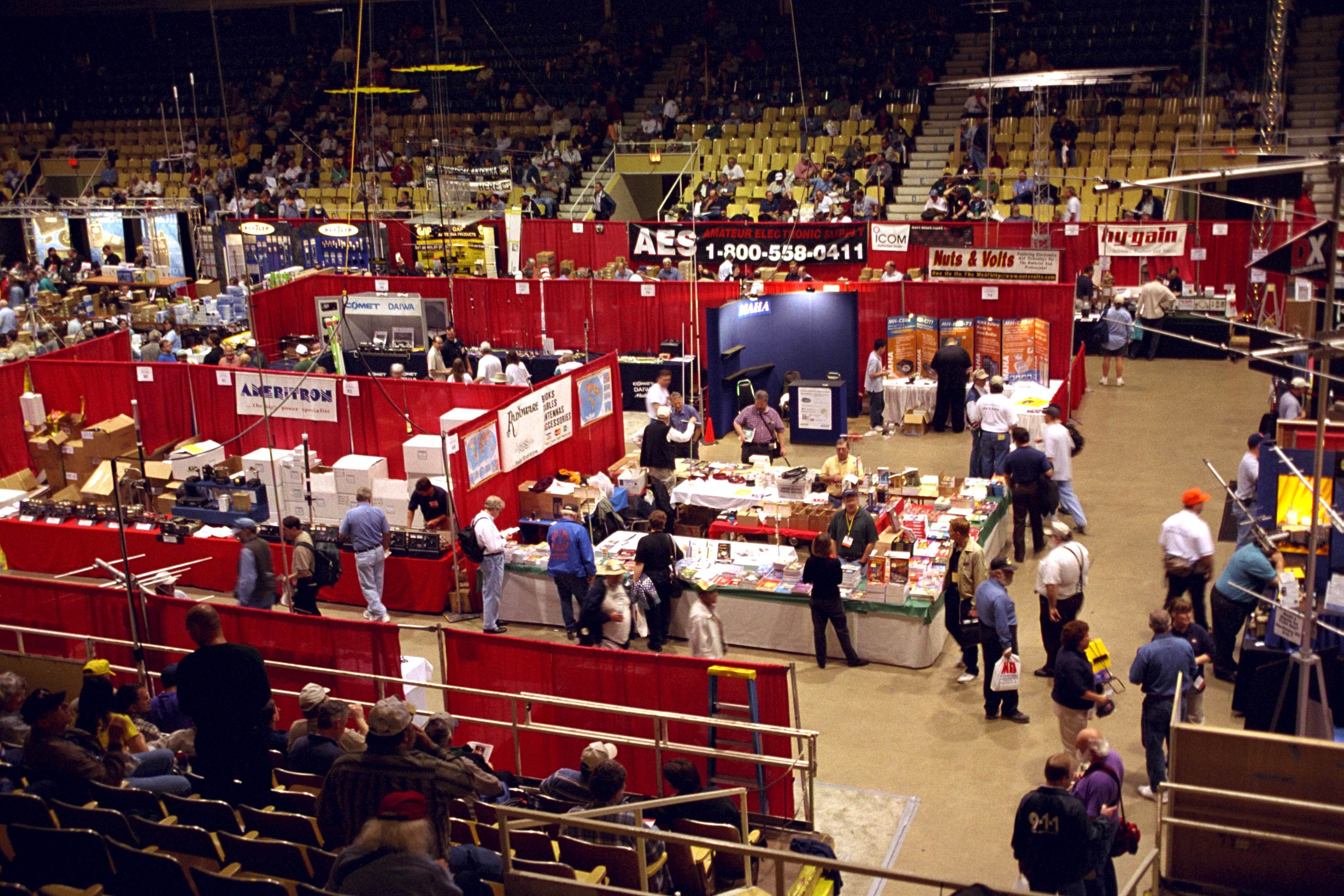
Interior of the arena during the 2003 Hamvention.

The arena was also venue to many types of concerts, including Nirvana who played there on the 30th October 1993, music festivals, trade shows and conventions, formerly including the annual Dayton Hamvention (which, starting in 2017, is held at the Greene County Fairgrounds and Expo Center). The Miami Valley Home Improvement Show was also held annually here. According to the American Radio Relay League, the 2016 Hamvention had been the 65th held in Dayton and the Hara complex hosted more than 25,000 visitors in that final year. Hara Arena was where Wayne Gretzky played his first professional hockey game; a pre-season game between the Indianapolis Racers and the Cincinnati Stingers, on September 27, 1978.

Karen Wampler, arena marketing director at the time of its closure, cited a visit from the Ringling Bros. Circus as being particularly memorable, due to it to being the last stop on the tour for the circus.

Events and tenants
Preceded by None	Home of the Dayton Bombers; 1991–1996	Succeeded by Ervin J. Nutter Center
Preceded by None; None; None	Home of the Dayton Gems; 1964–1977; 1979–1980; 2009–2012	Succeeded by None; None; None
Preceded by Biltmore Hotel	Host of the Dayton Hamvention; 1964–2016	Succeeded by Greene County Fairgrounds
