= Seattle Flight =

Basketball team based in Lakewood, Washington

- Founded: 2010
- League: IBL 2013–2014
- Team history: Seattle Flight; 2013–Present
- Based in: Lakewood, Washington
- Arena: Pierce College Fort Steilacoom Health Education Center Gymnasium
- Colors: green, gold and white
- Owner: Shawn Kemp and Marvena Kemp
- Head coach: Ron Brown
- Championships: 0
- Website: http://www.ibl.com/seattle_flight

The Seattle Flight are a professional men's basketball based in Lakewood, Washington, approximately forty miles south of Seattle. They are former members of the International Basketball League and began play in the league in 2013 and ended in 2014. The team is backed by former Seattle SuperSonics star Shawn Kemp and his wife Marvena. They play their home games at the Pierce College Fort Steilacoom Health Education Center Gymnasium in Lakewood. The team colors of emerald green and gold are to honor their predecessors from the NBA.

== Season results and standings ==
The Flight's inaugural season ended with a 1–4 record.

Sat., June 1 Seattle 91 at Bellingham Slam 105
Sun., June 16 Seattle 110 at Vancouver Volcanoes 122
Sun., June 23 Vancouver Volcanoes 106 at Seattle 100
Wed., June 26 Seattle 136 at Japan Nippon Tornadoes 109
Sun., June 30 Bellingham Slam 117 at Seattle 104
