= North Side Gymnasium =

Arena in Indiana, United States

Coordinates: 41.701748°N 85.975463°W

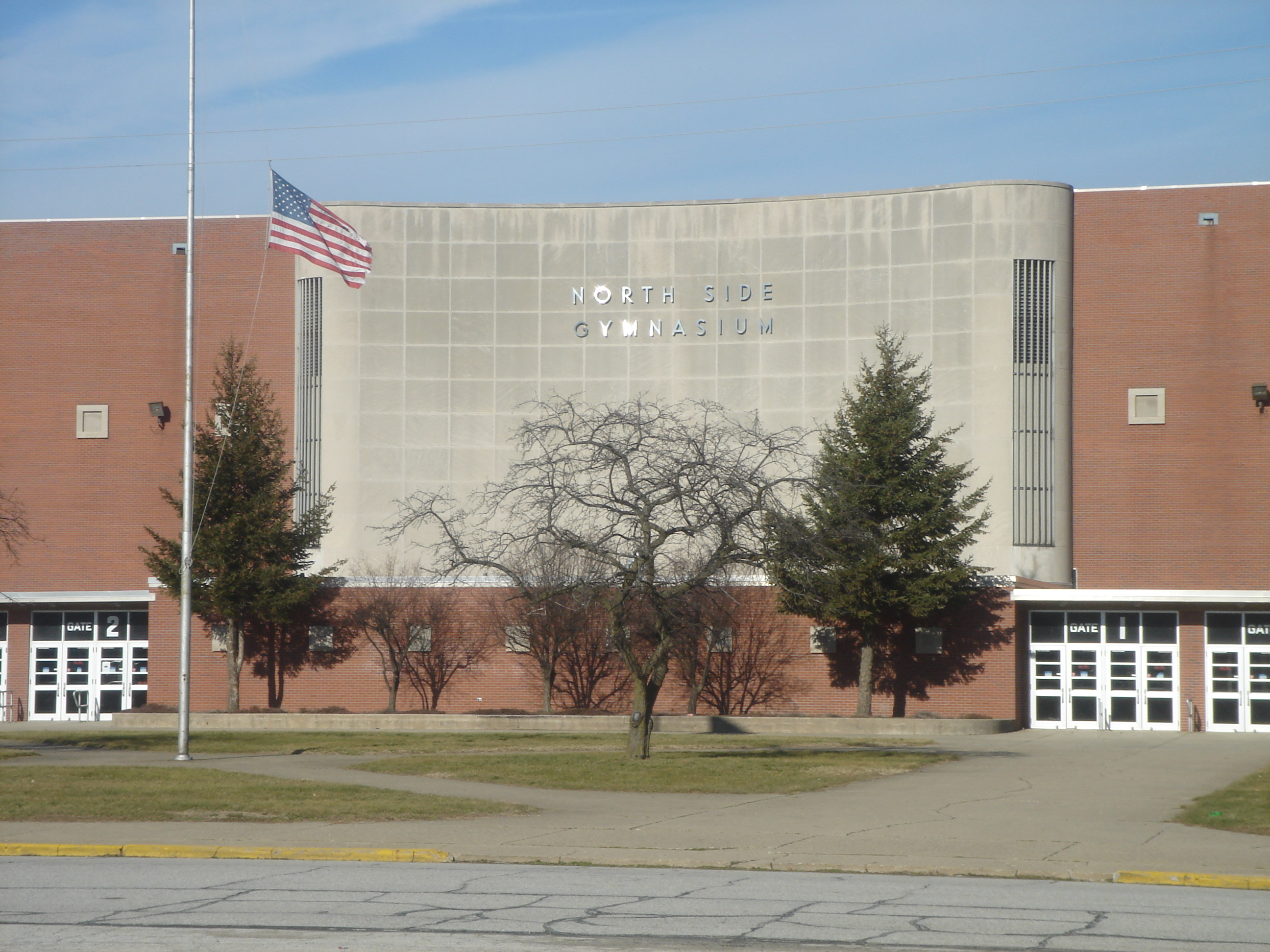
The Northside Gymnasium.

The North Side Gymnasium is a 7,373 seat multi-purpose arena opened in 1954 located in Elkhart, Indiana, United States on the campus of North Side Middle School. Elkhart High School, hosts their varsity boys' and girls' basketball games along with other varsity sports such as volleyball and wrestling. It was home to the Elkhart Express of the International Basketball League. At one point it was the largest high school gym in the country, seating 8,200 prior to renovation.

Ground was broken on the building in July 1953 and the project cost a total of $6.9 million, with work proceeding after a protest filed with the Indiana State Board of Tax Commissioners was rejected. When the field house was opened on November 24, 1954, the facility was the largest high school gym in the United States. In its initial season of operation, the gym generated $57,500 in revenue from ticket sales, concessions and parking fees from the 134,000 fans who attended high school games.

The gym has also hosted professional wrestling matches, ice shows and the Harlem Globetrotters.

For the 2005 season, the Elkhart Express of the International Basketball League debuted in the North Side Gymnasium, under a deal in which the arena was leased by the school district to the park board, which then leased it to the team, as part of an effort to skirt restrictions on leasing the facility for financial gain.

== See also ==
- Largest high school gyms in the United States
