= Akron Lightning =

Akron Lightning logo

The Akron Lightning was a team in the International Basketball League's inaugural 2005 campaign. The team played home games at Stow-Munroe Falls High School. Boasting a lineup of primarily local players, the Lightning finished with a dismal 2-15 record, the worst in the 17 team league. The team's only player to crack the league's top 25 scorers was Jason Edwin, who tied for 13th with 21.8 ppg. Later in the season, for away games, the team had to use a roster of players local to their opponent's area in order to save money. The team was suspended after the season and the team eventually became what are now the Akron Quakers.

== Roster ==
- Chet Feldman - #25 College: Ohio University Height: 6' 0
- Shawn Chisholm - #69 College: Dalhousie University Height: 7' 1
- Kevin Kovach - #4 College: Oakland University Height: 6' 2
- Nate Schindewolf - #23 College: University of Akron Height: 6' 5
- Greg Lewis - #2 College: Winthrop College Height: 6' 5
- Bryant Bowden - #5 College: DePaul University Height: 6' 8
- Andy Norman - #15 College: University of Akron Height: 5' 10
- Richard Bradley - #30 College: Mercyhurst College Height: 6' 2
- Rob Wininger - #32 College: Ashland University Height: 6' 4
- Roger Evans - #21 College: Ashland University Height: 6' 7
- Kevin Verde - #33 College: Walsh University Height: 6' 7
- Jason Hamilton - #1 College: Walsh University Height: 6' 1
- Chris Workman - #22 College: Loras College Height: 6' 1
- Chester Harper - #31 School: Alliance High School Height: 6' 5
- Jason Workman - #3 College: Ashland University Height: 6' 1
- Jason Herceg - #12 School: Stow High School Height: 6' 2
- Antoine Campbell - #20 College: Ashland University Height: 5' 10
