= Ball Don't Lie =

2008 film directed by Brin Hill

- Directed by: Brin Hill
- Written by: Brin Hill; Matt de la Peña
- Produced by: Brin Hill; Mark G. Mathis; Brigitte Mueller; Michael Roiff; Jeffrey Smith
- Starring: Grayson Boucher; Kim Hidalgo; Rosanna Arquette; Emilie de Ravin; Nick Cannon; Ludacris
- Cinematography: Matthew Jensen
- Edited by: Steven Pilgrim
- Music by: Tony Morales
- Release date: April 25, 2008 (Tribeca Film Festival)
- Running time: 102 minutes
- Country: United States
- Language: English

Ball Don't Lie is a 2008 film directed by Brin Hill. It is an adaptation of the novel of the same name, written by Matt de la Peña. It stars AND1 Mixtape team member Grayson Boucher, a.k.a. The Professor. The film premiered at the 2008 Tribeca Film Festival.

== Plot ==
Ball Don't Lie plays out over one day in the life of Sticky (Boucher), a skinny high school sophomore basketball prodigy from Venice, California. Burdened with emotional scars from a traumatic childhood, a callous foster care system, and obsessive-compulsive personality disorder, Sticky manages to transcend his limitations whenever he has a ball in his hands.

== Cast ==
- Maxim Knight as "Sticky", Age 7
- Grayson Boucher as "Sticky"
- Kim Hidalgo as Annie
- Emilie de Ravin as "Baby"
- Rosanna Arquette as Francine
- Ludacris as Julius
- Cress Williams as Dante
- Nick Cannon as Mico
- Dania Ramirez as Carmen
- Melissa Leo as Georgia
- Harold Perrineau as Jimmy
- Mykelti Williamson as Dallas
- Robert Wisdom as Perkins
- Steve Harris as Rob
- Allen Maldonado as "Sin"
- John Bryant Davila as Venice Hardcore Teen
- Mathew St. Patrick as Louis Accord
- Michael Shamus Wiles as Coach Reynolds
- Kirby Bliss Blanton as Jamie Smith
