= Tri Valley Titans =

Defunct Californian basketball team

- Founded: 2005
- League: IBL 2005-2007
- Team history: San Jose Ballers (2005), Tri City Ballers (2006), Tri Valley Titans (2007)
- Based in: Livermore, California
- Arena: Las Positas College; Physical Education Complex; 2007
- Colors: Black, Red & Yellow.
- Owner: TriValley Titans, Inc.
- Head coach: Ward Farris
- Championships: None

The Tri Valley Titans were an International Basketball League franchise based in Livermore, California. The Titans represented the Tri-Valley area of California, an area that also includes Danville, Dublin, San Ramon and Pleasanton, California. The team normally played its home games at Las Positas College, in Livermore. The IBL is a spring league, playing a March through June regular season.

== History ==
The Tri Valley Titans were introduced by the International Basketball League on August 10, 2006.

== 2005 Season ==
The team nickname in 2005 and 2006 was the Ballers. The team played its first season in San Jose, California at San Jose City College. The team boasted the IBL's two top scorers in Jovan Harris (35.3 ppg), and Alejandro Thomas (28.3 ppg), but finished a disappointing 10-10.

== 2006 season ==
As the newly relocated Tri City Ballers, playing in Newark, California, the franchise displayed much better results, finishing 14–4, and pacing the west. All-Star Jovan Harris once again led the team in scoring, but this time with just 24.6 ppg. The team also featured all-star Rock Winston (21.0 ppg).

== 2007 season ==
The nomadic franchise again was on the move to Livermore, California for 2007, this time taking on the name, Tri Valley Titans. The team compiled a record of 10–4 as a member of the Southwest Division, but three of its scheduled regular season games were apparently not played. The IBL deactivated the team at the end of the regular season.

== Standings ==
Regular Season
Year	Wins	Losses	Percentage	League	Division
2005	10	10	.500	T-9th - IBL	T-5th - West Division
2006	14	4	.777	3rd - IBL	1st West Division
2007	10	4	.714	8th - IBL	3rd Southwest Division
Total	34	18	.654	N/A	N/A
