= Dominic Waters =

American professional basketball player (born 1986)

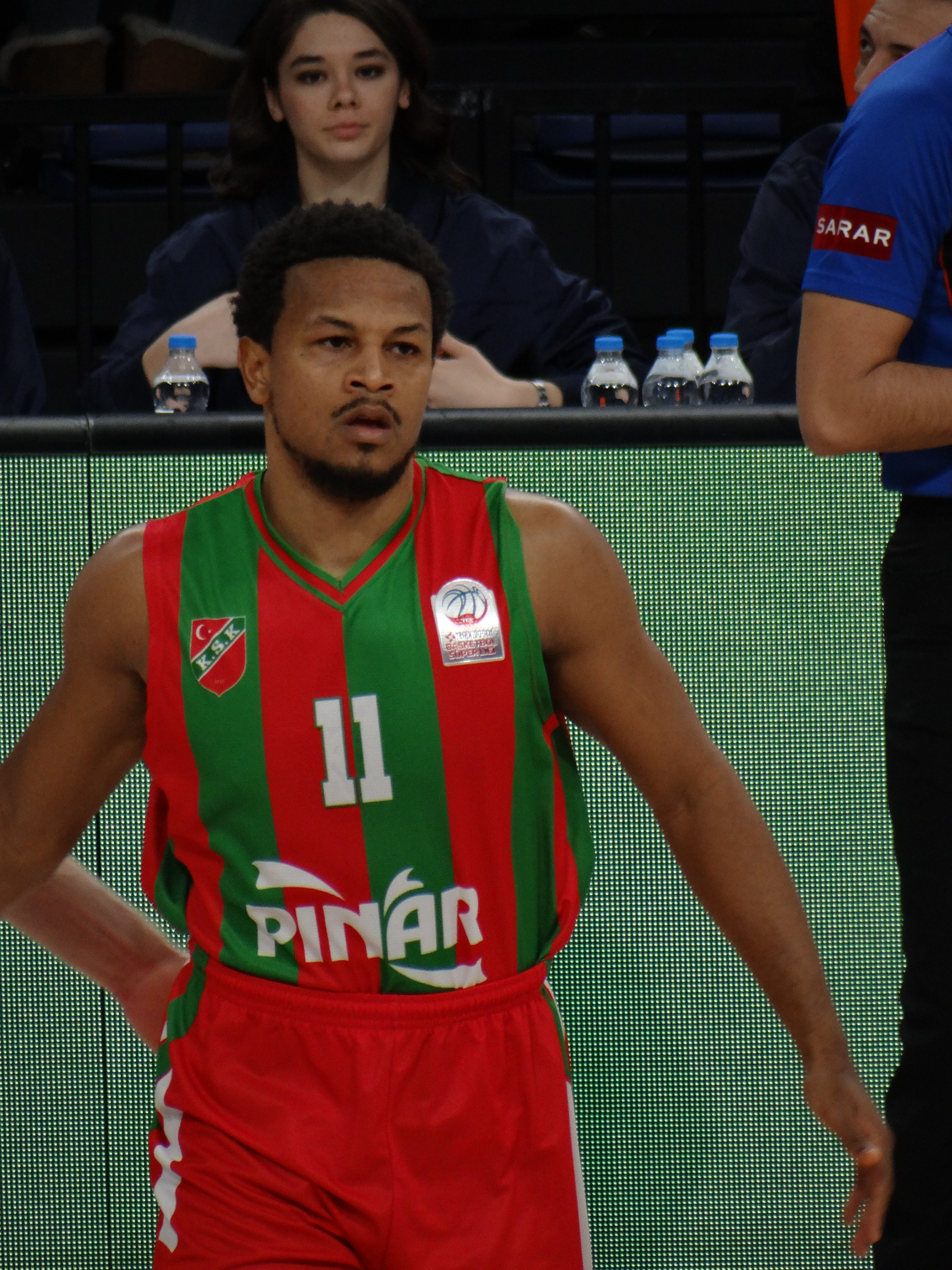

Free agent
- Position: Point guard

Personal information
- Born: September 28, 1986 (age 40) Portland, Oregon, U.S.
- Listed height: 6 ft 1 in (1.85 m)
- Listed weight: 180 lb (82 kg)

Career information
- High school: Grant (Portland, Oregon)
- College: Hawaii (2005–2007); Portland State (2008–2010)
- NBA draft: 2010: undrafted
- Playing career: 2010–present

Career history
- 2010: Portland Showtime
- 2010–2011: VOO Verviers-Pepinster
- 2011–2012: Liège Basket
- 2012: Union Olimpija
- 2012–2013: Hapoel Holon
- 2013–2014: Bàsquet Manresa
- 2014: s.Oliver Baskets
- 2014: Grand Rapids Drive
- 2014–2015: Kolossos Rodou
- 2015–2016: Aris Thessaloniki
- 2016: Pallacanestro Cantù
- 2016–2017: Olympiacos
- 2017–2018: Pınar Karşıyaka
- 2018–2019: Nanterre 92
- 2019–2020: Ironi Nahariya
- Hapoel Be'er Sheva B.C.

Career highlights
- Israeli League assists leader (2013); Belgian League assists leader (2012); NABL All-Star (2010); All-NABL Second Team (2010); 2× Second-team All-Big Sky (2009, 2010); WAC Freshman of the Year (2006)
- Stats at Basketball Reference

Dominic Wayne Waters (born September 28, 1986) is a Former American professional basketball player, who lastly played for Ironi Nahariya of the Israeli Premier League. Standing at 1.85 m (6 ft 1 in), he plays at the point guard position. In 2013, he was the Israeli Premier League Assists Leader.

== High school career ==
Waters played high school basketball at Grant High School, in Portland, Oregon.

== College career ==
Waters played college basketball at the University of Hawaii, where he played with the Hawaii Rainbow Warriors and at Portland State University, where he played with the Portland State Vikings.

== Professional career ==
After graduating from Portland State, Waters joined the Portland Showtime for the 2010 NABL season. He went on to go undrafted in the 2010 NBA draft, and subsequently joined the Utah Jazz for the NBA Summer League. In August 2010, he signed with STB Le Havre of France for the 2010–11 season. However, he was later released by Le Havre a month later, after the team was not satisfied with him. In October 2010, he signed with VOO Verviers-Pepinster of the Belgian Basketball League.

On May 29, 2011, Waters signed with the Belgian club Liège Basket for the 2011–12 season.

On July 29, 2012, Waters signed a one-year deal with Union Olimpija of the Slovenian Basketball League and ABA League. In December 2012, he left Olimpija.

On January 2, 2013, he signed with Hapoel Holon of Israel, for the rest of the 2012–13 season. In 2013, he was the Israeli Premier League Assists Leader.

On August 12, 2013, Waters signed with the Liga ACB club Bàsquet Manresa of Spain for the 2013–14 season. On January 14, 2014, he parted ways with Manresa. Three days later, he signed with the Basketball Bundesliga club s.Oliver Baskets, of Germany, for the rest of the 2013–14 season.

On November 1, 2014, Waters was selected by the Grand Rapids Drive in the third round of the 2014 NBA Development League Draft. On November 21, 2014, he was released by the Drive, after averaging 3.0 points and 3.5 rebounds in two games. On December 17, 2014, he signed with Kolossos Rodou of Greece for the rest of the Greek Basket League's 2014–15 season.

On July 29, 2015, he signed a one-year deal with Aris Thessaloniki of Greece.

On August 2, 2016, Waters signed with the VTB United League club Yenisey Krasnoyarsk of Russia. On September 11, 2016, he left the team because he didn't pass his physical tests. On September 22, 2016, he joined the German club Bayern Munich's training camp.

On October 6, 2016, he signed with the LBA club Pallacanestro Cantù of Italy. On December 27, 2016, he left Cantù, and signed with the Greek team Olympiacos for the rest of the 2016–17 season. Waters played in 21 EuroLeague games with the Reds, including an appearance in the championship game of the 2017 EuroLeague Final Four versus Fenerbahçe, and counted 4.1 points plus 1.5 assists per game on average. On March 2, 2017, he achieved a career-high by scoring 14 points at Menora Mivtachim Arena of Tel Aviv against Israeli powerhouse Maccabi. At the end of the season, Waters left Olympiacos after team's failure to defend the national league title in a dramatic best-of-five finals series versus rivals Panathinaikos.

On August 13, 2017, Waters signed with Turkish club Pınar Karşıyaka for the 2017–18 season.

On July 20, 2018, Waters signed a one-year deal with the French team Nanterre 92. In 37 games played for Nanterre, he averaged 11.1 points and 4.1 assists per game, while shooting 46.7 percent from three-point range. Waters led Nanterre to the 2019 Basketball Champions League Quarterfinals, where they eventually were eliminated by Virtus Bologna.

On August 5, 2019, Waters returned to Israel for a second stint, signing with Ironi Nahariya for the 2019–20 season. On November 18, 2019, Waters recorded a season-high 26 points, while shooting 9-of-14 from the field, along with nine assists and three rebounds in a 95–76 win over Hapoel Gilboa Galil. Two days later, he was named Israeli League Round 6 MVP. Waters averaged 15.1 points, 2.3 rebounds and 6.3 assists per game. He re-signed with the team on October 13, 2020.

== Personal life ==
Waters is a personal friend of Ndamukong Suh.
