= Mahoning Valley Wildcats =

Former International Basketball League team

The Mahoning Valley Wildcats (sometimes referred to as the Youngstown Wildcats), were a team in the International Basketball League based in Struthers, Ohio. The team shared its name with the mascot of Struthers High School, whose gym they shared.

Rob Spon coached the Wildcats, who went 12-7 in their first season. The Wildcats were led in scoring by Rick McFadden, who tied for ninth in the league with 22.8 ppg. Three players made the all-star team, McFadden, Lawrence Culver, and TeJay Anderson.

With no notice, the Wildcats were removed from the IBL schedule in early 2006, having been replaced by the Lansing Capitals.
