= Arizona Derby Dames =

Roller derby league

- Metro area: Phoenix, Arizona
- Country: United States
- Founded: 2005
- Teams: Bombshells; Brutal Beauties; Coffin Draggers; Doomsday Valkyries; Schoolyard Scrappers; Runaway Brides
- Track type(s): Banked track
- Venue: Hall of Dames
- Affiliations: RDCL
- Website: arizonaderbydames.com

Arizona Derby Dames (AZDD) is an amateur roller derby league based in the Phoenix, Arizona metropolitan area, established in 2005. The league currently plays RDCL ruleset. The Arizona Derby Dames are one of the only banked track roller derby leagues in the world, and a unique experience that can only be seen in Phoenix and a small handful of other cities.

AZDD was founded by four skaters, Suzy Homewrecker (XXX), Joan Threat (50), All The Way Mae (213) and Prima Donna (32). These skaters aspired for AZDD to become Arizona's first banked-track roller derby league. These founding skaters were originally members of Arizona Roller Derby.

AZDD holds one doubleheader bout about once a month (September to May). Between 2006 and 2008, these bouts were held at the Castle Sports Club in Phoenix. In late 2008, the league announced that the 2009 season would be held in the Arizona Veterans Memorial Coliseum. On March 20, 2010, AZDD played their first doubleheader at the Veteran's Memorial Coliseum using a newly designed banked track. The crowd, estimated to be over 4,000, is a record for the league and a record crowd for "resurgence era" roller derby in Arizona. Previously, the last known banked-track events in Arizona were in the 1960s with the Arizona Raiders of the National Skating Derby. In 2013 AZDD began hosting bouts in their own space, called The Hall of Dames.

Arizona Derby Dames became a founding member of the Roller Derby Coalition of Leagues in January 2012.

== Teams ==
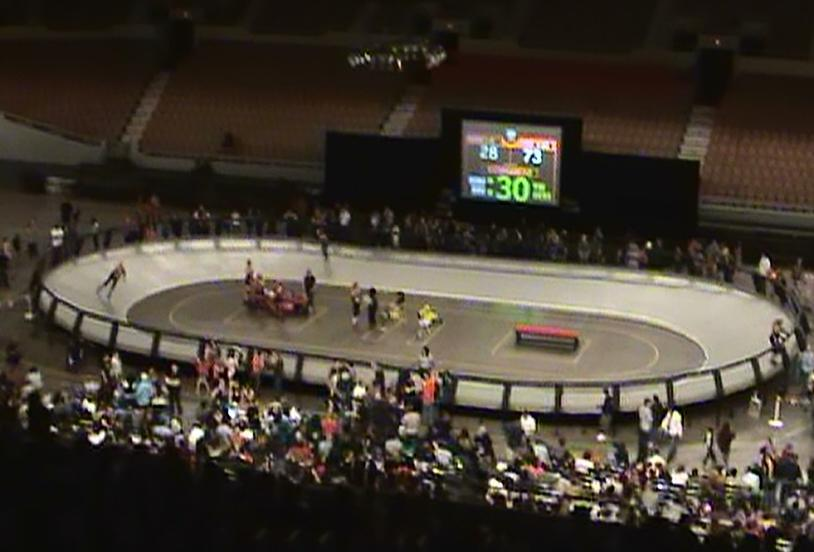
AZDD's banked track for the 2010 season

The Arizona Derby Dames has five home teams:

- The Bombshells are themed after the pin-up girls of the 1940s. Teams colors are red and leopard print. With their vintage flair and explosive energy, The Bombshells are a force to be reckoned with on the track. They skate with style and finesse, dazzling the crowd with their flashy moves and killer teamwork. Team chant: "Give 'em Hell Bombshells!"
- The Brutal Beauties are the beauty queen rejects of the league, apparently inspired by Tonya Harding. The team colors are pink and black. The Brutal Beauties are a fierce combination of beauty and brawn, bringing a whole new meaning to the phrase "beauty with a punch." Don't let their glamorous appearance fool you—they're tough as nails and ready to rumble. Team chant: "Viva La Pink!"
- The Coffin Draggers are dubbed "the prettiest ghouls in the morgue". Step into the spooky realm of the Coffin Draggers, where ghoulish vibes meet roller derby madness. Some team members will wear face make-up and much fake blood. Team colors are neon green and black. Team chant: "Coffin F***ing Draggers!"
- The Runaway Brides was the league's 2008 expansion team. This team was inspired by the story of Jennifer Wilbanks. Say "I do" to chaos with the Runaway Brides, a team of roller derby rebels who refuse to play by the rules. Having left good manners at the altar, the Brides are here to break hearts and break ankles. Team colors: White and Maroon. Team chant: "Bride tribe!"
- The Doomsday Valkyries are the league's 2016 expansion team. Team colors are orange and black. Some team members will wear face make-up. The Doomsday Valkyries are a force of nature, embodying the strength and ferocity of post apocalyptic warriors. Team chant: "Valhalla!"
- The Schoolyard Scrappers are the league's 2007 expansion team. Team colors Royal blue, yellow and plaid, these "good girls gone bad" reminiscent of the private school bully. Due to low numbers, the Scrappers have been placed in detention beginning in season 19 (2024), hoping to return once the league has enough skaters to support 6 home teams again.

Additional teams:

- Hot Shots is Arizona Derby Dames travel team representing the state of Arizona on the banked track, and one of the strongest reigning banked track travel teams to date. The team name is inspired by the Granite Mountain Hot Shots, a crew within the Prescott Fire Department whose mission was to fight wildfires. On June 30, 2013, 19 of the 20 members of the group perished fighting the Yarnell Hill Fire. The Hot Shots won their first RDCL tournament, Battle on the Bank, in July 2024.
- Minor Assaults is AZDD's junior roller derby team (ages 13-18). The Minor Assaults are a team of up-and-coming roller derby prodigies ushering in the next generation of skaters as the future of the sport.
- Regulators are the incredible team of officials who keep the game safe and fair. The team is inspired by Young Guns, with the team chant, "Mount Up!"

== "Rookie" program ==
AZDD recruits members through tryouts that are held a couple times per year. Those new recruits who pass the tryouts start attending required practices and will eventually need to pass a skills test and a scrimmage test before being drafted to a team. While waiting for placement on a team, the rookie skaters perform other tasks at the bout such as the sale of raffle tickets, talking to fans, and cleanup duties throughout bout nights. More info about joining the AZDD rookie program can be found on the website.
