= Grayson Boucher =

American basketball player (born 1984)

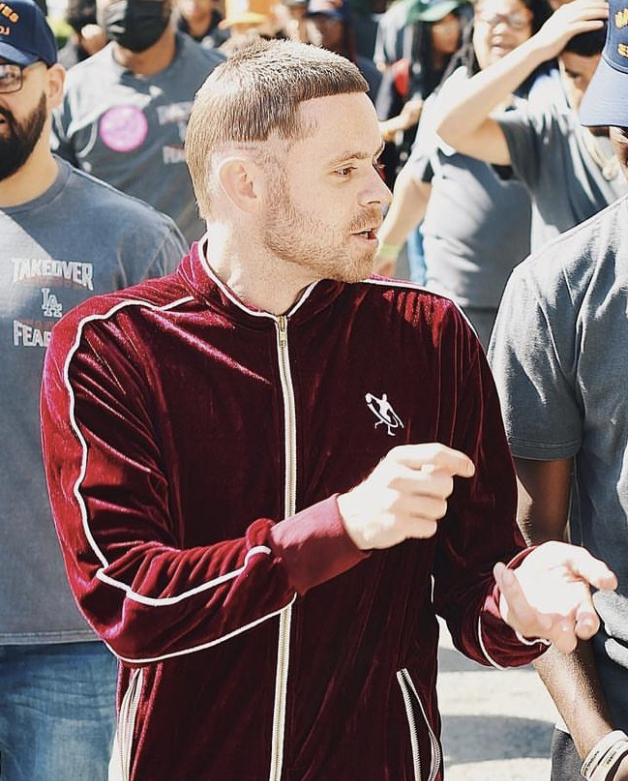
- Boucher in 2022

Personal information
- Born: June 10, 1984 (age 42) Keizer, Oregon, U.S.
- Listed height: 5 ft 10 in (1.78 m)
- Listed weight: 155 lb (70 kg)

Career information
- High school: McNary (Keizer, Oregon); Salem Academy (Salem, Oregon)
- College: Chemeketa CC (2002–2003)
- Playing career: 2006–2008
- Position: Guard

Career history
- 2006: Salem Stampede
- 2007–2008: Atlanta Krunk

Other information

YouTube information
- Channel: Professor Live
- Genre: Streetball
- Subscribers: 8 million
- Views: 1.3 billion
- Last updated: 24 April 2024

Grayson Scott "The Professor" Boucher (born June 10, 1984) is an American professional streetball player. He is most known for playing on the highly stylized, international AND1 Mixtape Tour; he has also appeared in several movies including Semi-Pro, Ball Don't Lie, and Hustle, and he is a playable character in several video games.

Boucher attended McNary High School but transferred to nearby Salem Academy where he made all-state honors. With a billed height of 5'10" and weight of 155 pounds (178 cm, 70 kg), he was given no scholarship offers in high school. Boucher attended Chemeketa Community College, where he played on the basketball team. As a sophomore, he forfeited his college eligibility when he became a professional streetballer. Between 2006 and 2008, he had short stints in professional basketball with the Salem Stampede of the IBL and the Atlanta Krunk of the CBA.

Since the AND1 Mixtape Tour folded, he has played on several other streetball teams, but most notably has transferred his fame into coaching NBA players, and a YouTube channel with over 8 million subscribers.

== Professional career ==
=== Salem Stampede (2006) ===
On February 9, 2006, Boucher signed with the Salem Stampede of the International Basketball League.

=== Atlanta Krunk (2007–2008) ===
Boucher played for the Atlanta Krunk of the Continental Basketball Association during the 2007–08 season.

== Street basketball career ==
When the AND1 Mixtape Tour stopped in Portland, Oregon, Boucher and his brother attended as fans. Boucher found out there was an "open run" tryout to join the tour, and earned a spot on the team. By summer 2009, Boucher was featured prominently in the tour's marketing, appearing on the main page of its website and in various advertisements.

He has played in over 30 countries and has been featured in seven seasons of Streetball on ESPN, five AND1 mixtape DVDs, four AND1 commercials, and an AND1 video game.

After leaving AND1 in January 2011, Boucher played streetball for Ball Up. He became acquainted with Ball Up's CEO, Demetrius Spencer, in late 2008. The Ball Up Tour featured most of the players from the AND1 Mixtape Tour and focused more on the on-the-court action, a departure from the AND1 tour, which featured more behind-the-scenes footage. The international tour stopped in over 10 countries, and had plans for a winter tour in the U.S.

== Career statistics ==
=== CBA ===
==== Regular season ====
Year	Team	GP	GS	MPG	FG%	3P%	FT%	RPG	APG	SPG	BPG	PPG
2007–08	Atlanta	13	5	20.7	.429	.444	.333	.8	2.3	.9	.0	4.5

== Media career ==
Boucher has used his status to appear in several films portraying basketball players. He appeared in the film Semi-Pro, starring Will Ferrell, as a point guard on the opposing squad in the final game of the movie, and was featured in the special features section of the DVD version as well. Boucher played the lead role of Sticky in the film Ball Don't Lie, based on the book of the same name. The film was completed and shown nationally at several film festivals but was never officially released.

Boucher also took on the role of Spider-Man in a YouTube web-series he created. In the series, he disguised himself as the superhero and went to various basketball courts in the Los Angeles area to play against unsuspecting competitors. The first episode reached 14 million views on YouTube within a week of being uploaded. It was featured on the ESPN website, and gained further attention from Shaquille O'Neal, who tweeted the video to his followers. The third episode featured NBA star Jamal Crawford, and further plans were made to feature other known basketball players. The fourth episode of the series featured another street basketball player, Larry "Bone Collector" Williams, who disguised himself as the popular Marvel Comics superhero Captain America. The sixth installment featured a basketball player disguised as Deadpool. The seventh part of series had a disguised Boucher facing off against another basketball player, disguised as Carnage.

Boucher also launched a ball-handling guide called Super-Human Dribbling, a web-based tutorial available for download online, that features Boucher's drills and workouts.

Boucher now has his own YouTube channel where he posts mixtapes of him playing in local basketball leagues, fun and comical videos, tutorials, and other entertaining basketball videos.

In April 2019, Boucher suffered a career-threatening non-contact total tear of his Achilles tendon. He also suffered from accidental overdose of hydrocodone and acetaminophen during the early stages of rehabilitation, but had made a full recovery as of June 2020. During his rehab period, he continued to publish YouTube content consisting of undated footage from before the injury, choosing not to make news of the injury public until August 2020, after his recovery was complete.

== Filmography ==
Year	Title	Role	Notes
2003–2008	Streetball: The AND1 Mixtape Tour	Himself	TV series
2004	AND1 Mixtape Vol. 7	Himself	DVD release
2004	AND1 Ball Access: Global Invasion	Himself	DVD release
2005	AND1 Mixtape Vol. 8: Back on the Block	Himself	DVD release
2006	AND1 Mixtape Tour: Asia Pacific	Himself	DVD release
2006	AND1 Mixtape Vol. 9: Area Codes	Himself	DVD release
2006	AND1 Streetball	Himself	Video game
2008	AND1 Mixtape X: The United Streets of America	Himself	DVD release
2008	Semi-Pro	Spurs Player #22	Uncredited
2008	Ball Don't Lie	Sticky	Lead role
2012	Ball Up: Life on the Road	Himself	Documentary series
2018	3on3 Freestyle	Himself	Video game
2018	NBA Live 19	Himself	Video game
2022	Hustle	Himself	Movie
2022	Dem Tinseltown Homiez, the Hollywood Guys	Himself	TV series
2022	Untold: The Rise and Fall of And1	Himself	Documentary
