= Arizona Flame =

International Basketball League team

- League: IBL 2007–09
- Founded: 2007
- History: Phoenix Flame 2007; Scottsdale Flame 2007; Arizona Flame 2008–09
- Arena: Arizona Veterans Memorial Coliseum; Grand Canyon University
- Location: Casa Grande, Arizona
- Team colors: red, orange
- Head coach: Maury Samilton
- Ownership: Stephen Moss-Kelley

The Arizona Flame, formerly the Phoenix Flame and the Scottsdale Flame, were an International Basketball League (IBL) team based in Casa Grande, Arizona. The team played home games at the Arizona Veterans Memorial Coliseum and on the campus of Grand Canyon University. The Flame was the Phoenix's first minor league basketball team since the Phoenix Eclipse folded after the 2001–02 American Basketball Association season. It was owned by Stephen Moss-Kelley, professional basketball player and former IBL all-star. When the team was announced in June 2006, the Flame named their home venue as North Phoenix Baptist Church. By October 2006, the Arizona Republic listed Arizona Veterans Memorial Coliseum as the team's home venue. Tickets for the Flame's opening season were eight dollars for adults and four dollars for children. Maury "Mo" Samilton was the team's head coach in 2007.

On February 19, 2007, the Phoenix Flame owners acquired a new IBL franchise, the Arizona Lightning. The Lightning announced they would begin play for the 2008 IBL season. It was the second active professional minor league basketball team in the Arizona. The Lightning hit the court in 2007 as a traveling team for the IBL.

== All-time roster ==
- Brandon Bardwell
- Cedric Ceballos
- Devin Greene
- Michael Hawkins
- Monte Jones
- Tony Jones
- Robert Keil
- Donnell Knight
- Jamal Livingstone
- Arthur Lewis
- Craig Lewis
- Larry Morinia
- Stephen Moss-Kelley
- Mike Schwertly
- Quincy Shannon
- Maurice Shaw
- James Singleton
- Derrick Smith
- Sascha Stafford
- Del Summers
- Jimmy Tricco
- Omar Waller
- Brandon Wells
- Chris White

== Season by season ==
Regular Season
Year	Wins	Losses	Percentage	Division
2007	9	10	.474	4th – Midwest Division

== All-stars ==
- Jamal Livingston
- Larry Morinia
- Abraham Osayomi
