= Lake County Lakers =

The Lake County Lakers was a franchise in the International Basketball League, that played home games in Lake County, Illinois.

The team was owned by Shawn Chism, who also served as the team's General Manager.

== Former venues ==
- College of Lake County, Grayslake
- Grayslake North High School, Grayslake
- Lakes Community High School, Lake Villa
- Trinity International University, Deerfield
- Waukegan High School, Waukegan
- Woodland School, Gurnee
