= Oakland Slammers =

Basketball team from Oakland, California, active from 2005-2006

The Oakland Slammers, based in Oakland, California were members of the International Basketball League (2005-) for two seasons, and completed their second season in the league in 2006.

In its first year, the Slammers finished 5–14, good for seventh in the west, and was led by Solomon Wilkins 25.9 ppg, Delonte Hoskins 17.9 ppg, Carey Williams 17.5 ppg, Larry Morinia 16.2 ppg and Jairus Michael 11.6 ppg.

The Slammers played their home games at Merritt College in Oakland.

== Related Links/Sources ==
- - Team page on IBL Website
