= Snohomish County Explosion =

Semi-professional basketball team

- League: IBL 2006–09; NABL 2010
- Founded: 2006
- Folded: 2010
- History: Everett Explosion; 2006-2007; Snohomish County Explosion; 2007–2010
- Arena: Everett Events Center; 2007, 2010; Monroe Sports Arena; 2008–2009
- Location: Monroe, Washington; 2008–2009; Everett, Washington; 2007, 2010
- Team colors: Yellow, Blue
- Head coach: Nathan Mumm
- Ownership: Courtyard Media Foundation

The Snohomish County Explosion was a semi-professional basketball team that last played in the National Athletic Basketball League (NABL) in 2010. The team was based in Everett, Washington, in 2007 in Monroe, Washington, from 2008 to 2010. The Explosion is owned by Courtyard Media Foundation, whose president Nathan Mumm oversaw team operations. The Explosion were the IBL's 2007 Western Division Champions.

== History ==
On March 17, 2007, The Everett Explosion in its first season went 16-4 regular season, and 17-5 overall and won the International Basketball League (IBL) West Division. The Explosion sent three All-Stars to the IBL All Star Game. The first season for the Everett Explosion ended on a high note, being ranked number one in the nation by the Massey Ratings index. The Explosion at that time was owned by Courtyard Media Foundation, the current president is Nathan Mumm.

The Everett Explosion moved out of Everett to Monroe and changed their name to "Snohomish County Explosion" as the begin to build a new sports facility. Randy Redwine returned for the second season as the head coach. The team went 14-9 regular season, and 14-10 overall with a first round loss in the playoffs. Donald Watts University of Washington basketball star retired from basketball ending his career with the Explosion. The Explosion was successful in the move, drawing attendance numbers close to 1000 people for key games during the season, with over 3700 in attendance on opening night. The Explosion was also the first team to play a truly international game, hosting the Chinese Shaanxi Kylins team on May 10, 2008.

In 2009 the Snohomish County Explosion changed the coaching staff as Chris Weakley former Explosion player moved into the Head Coach Position and later returned as a player. This team finished 9-11 in the regular season and secured second place in the IBL Western Conference Finals, defeating the number one-seeded Edmonton Energy in the biggest upset in IBL Playoff history. The team announced at the end of the season that it would not continue with the IBL league as the leagues stability was a concern with the Explosion ownership.

In 2010, the Snohomish County Explosion started the season with Chris Weakley as the head coach and was later replaced by Nathan Mumm, who took over a sub .500 team. The team finished third in the league with an 8-4 record and was eliminated in the Playoffs by the Salem Stamped two games to one in the best of three series. The Explosion were 7-1 at home in Monroe and Chris Weakley set a huge minor league record scoring 1000 points with the Explosion in his career. The Explosion retired his number three (3) to the Explosion Hall of Fame during the NABL Playoffs.

=== Team details ===
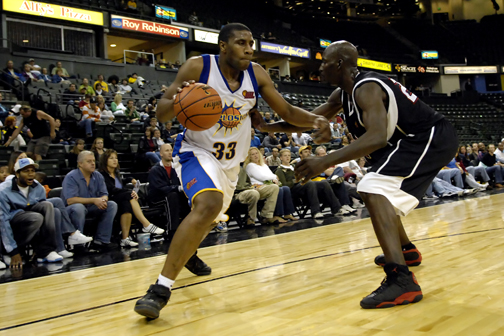
An unidentified Explosion player driving to the basket on the baseline in 2008.

Division titles: West Division Champions (2007)

General managers:

Nathan Mumm (May 2006 - May 2007) Brad Sturlaugson (May 2007 - Feb 2009) Sean Keck (Feb 2009 - Feb 2010)

Head coach:

Randy Redwine (2007) Randy Redwine (2008)

Redwine coached the Explosion to a 31-15 winning record in the IBL along with winning the Western Division Title in 2007. Randy was born in Louisville, Kentucky, and attended Central High School. While in high school he earned All-State honors his Jr. & Sr. year and competed against Wes Unseld in basketball for two years. After high school he attended college in Wyoming, and afterwards he moved to Denver, Colorado. After playing for many years, he began coaching youth teams, winning 4 city championships in a 6-year span. He moved to Seattle in October 1982 and coached in several leagues, winning multiple city championships. In 1994–1996 Randy coached a women's Pro-Am team that featured Joyce Walker & La Shanna White, who were both All-Americans. Under Randy's coaching, Club Seattle (Pro-Am) won over 10 league titles, 4 straight Reignman Classics, 3 RIP The Cut Championships, and 2 Emerald City Championships. He has coached various other teams and has an immense knowledge of coaching basketball.

Chris Weakley (2009–2010)

Coach Weakley went to Salem International University in West Virginia. He played two years of basketball under now head coach for the women's team West Virginia University, Mike Carey. He graduated with a criminal law degree. From there proceeded to play pro basketball.

During his playing career he set an NJCAA record for most three-point field goals in a single tournament game, hitting thirteen out of twenty-one baskets from beyond the arc. He averaged 25.5 points per game during this season before moving up the Salem International. His postseason accolades include setting an IBL record, hitting ten three-point baskets in 2007. After his collegiate career, Weakley endured 6 different minor league teams on his journey to the Explosion. Weakley has played professional ball overseas and helped coaching in the minor leagues the last 4 months in California.

He coached at Prince Avenue Prep in South Carolina for a year and a half, where he was able to accomplish winning a national championship, while posting a 48–2 record, and graduating 12 blue chip players. He has had the opportunity to learn from coaches such as Don Casey former coach of the L.A. Clippers, and Orlando Woolridge, former WNBA coach and current ABA coach, and Randy Redwine former coach for the Explosion in the IBL. As previously stated he has had the opportunity to experience pro basketball not only as a player, but also to learn the game from professional players and coaches getting a significant amount of experiencie at a young age. He feels extremely privileged and excited for the opportunity to coach and be affiliated with this organization, having played two seasons with the Explosion.

Nathan Mumm (2010)

Nathan Mumm took over the bench for the Explosion in the fourth season halfway through the season. Mumm was the athletic director and head basketball coach for Puget Sound CC, and in his second season at the school, he led PSCC to a National Championship in the NACCAA. Mumm a graduate from Marysville Pilchuck High School has coached on all levels, including high school basketball for 10 years before being hired into the college ranks. After three years of college coaching, Mumm was hired as an assistant coach for two years in the minor leagues.

Attendance:

Inaugural Game: 3,777 (4/10/2007)

Largest Game: 3,777 (4/10/2007)

Season Average: 1583 (2007) 845 (2008)

=== All-time player records ===
Triple Doubles: Rashaad Powell (4/7/2007) Devon Greene (5/24/2009) Jason Hicks (5/23/2009)

Most Points (Game): 62 Devon Greene (6/28/2009)

Most Assists (Game): 24 Anthony Slater (6/28/2009)

Most Rebounds (Game): 21 Eddie Brown (5/30/2010)

1000 Points Club: Chris Weakley

Team records

Best Regular Season Record: 16-4 (2007) Best Post Season Record: 2-1 (2009)

Winning Streak: 8 games (2007) Losing Streak: 4 games (2009)

Points per game, Season: 129.60 (2007) Points allowed per game, Season: 114.40 (2007)

Most Points in a game: 184 (6/6/2009) vs Japan

Most Assist in a game: 32 (6/14/08)

IBL Most Three Pointers in an IBL Playoff Game: Nine (9) Chris Weakley (July 2007)

Most Points in an IBL Playoff Game: Fifty Two (52) points - Devon Greene (July 2, 2009)

Most Three Pointers in a NABL Playoff Game: Eight (8) - Chris Ferguson (July 2010)

=== All-stars ===
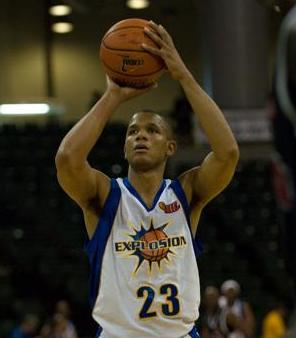
Donald Watts was an all-star in 2007 and 2008 as a member of the Explosion.

2007

- Justin Murray
- Rashaad Powell
- Donald Watts
- Jamaal Miller

2008

- Chris Weakley
- Shawn Kemp
- Donald Watts

2009

- Ike Ohanson
- Anthony Slater
- Devon Greene

2010

- Chris Weakley
- Shawn Wolter
- Chris Ferguson

== Season standings ==
Full Season
| Year | Wins | Losses | Percentage | Division |
|---|---|---|---|---|
| 2007 | 17 | 5 | .772 | 1st - West Division |
| 2008 | 14 | 10 | .583 | 3rd - West Division |
| 2009 | 9 | 11 | .450 | 3rd - America West Division |
| 2010 | 8 | 4 | .667 | 3rd - NABL League |

== Press links ==
In 2007-2010, Mumm served as the Snohomish County Explosion Chairman and was also the General Manager of the club in 2007-2008.

In 2008, Mumm serves as assistant coach to fix defensive problems on the court.

It was business as usual for the Everett Explosion. Despite the game not meaning anything in the standings, the Explosion continued their winning ways Tuesday night, defeating the Seattle Mountaineers 133-119 in an International Basketball League game played in front of 2,066 fans at the Everett Events Center.

The Explosion was led by Rashaad Powell, Donald Watts and Justin Murray, all with 21 points. Murray added 10 rebounds and five assists, and Powell tacked on four assists.

== Courtyard Media Foundation ==
Courtyard Media Foundation operated the Explosion Basketball from 2006 - 2010 with Nathan Mumm as the acting President of the organization.

In 2006, Courtyard Media became the owner of the Snohomish County Explosion. In 2010, Nathan became the Head Coach of the Snohomish County Explosion.
