= West Coast Hotshots =

- Founded: 2005
- Folded: 2012
- League: IBL
- Team history: Central Oregon Hotshots; 2005–2010; West Coast Hotshots; 2010–2012
- Based in: Bend, Oregon
- Colors: Red, yellow, and black
- Championships: 0

The West Coast Hotshots were a basketball team based in Bend, Oregon. The Hotshots played in the International Basketball League (IBL).

The team was founded in 2005 as the Central Oregon Hotshots. The team name was changed in 2010 to West Coast Hotshots.

The Hotshots played one game in the 2012 IBL season and then did not return in 2013.
