= Lansing Capitals =

Former team in the Independent Basketball Association

- Founded: 2006
- League: IBL (2006-07, 2010-11); IBA (2011-2016)
- Team history: Lansing Capitals (2006-2016)
- Based in: Dimondale, Michigan
- Arena: Aim High Sports
- Colors: Purple, Gold, white
- Owner: Renardo Jefferson
- Head coach: Dale Beard
- Championships: 0

The Lansing Capitals are a now-defunct member of the Independent Basketball Association (IBA). Founded in 2006, the Capitals were originally members of the International Basketball League. The team played their home games at Aim High Sports at The Summit Sports and Ice Complex in Dimondale, Michigan.

== IBL history ==
The Capitals played a full IBL season in 2006 and a partial season in 2007. In the first full season of competition, the Capitals had two players named to the 2006 IBL All-Star team: Cory Coe, who was the third leading scorer in the league at 28.1 ppg, and Steve Ordiway, who averaged 23.5 ppg.

The team went on hiatus in summer of 2007 and did not play again until the 2010 IBL Spring season, when they returned to the IBL as a "branding" (part-time) team. After another part-time season in the 2011 winter season, Lansing played their final IBL campaign during the 2011 Spring season before leaving for the IBA. In 2016, the team folded.

== Player advancement ==
The Capitals have placed multiple players in other leagues, such as the ABA, IBA, PBL, and UBA, as well as in European professional leagues, including: Cory Coe (Portugal), Carlos Gill (Spain), David Kone (France), Jonathan Jones (Slovakia), and Derrick Nelson (Saudi Arabia).

== Season-by-season ==
Year	League	W	L	Standings
2006	IBL	5	17	10th of 12
2007	IBL	2	11	-
2010 Spring	IBL	2	0	-
2010 Winter	IBL	0	2	-
2011 Spring	IBL	3	5	N/A
2012	IBA	7	8	N/A
2012-13	IBA	1	5	8th of 10
2014	IBA	3	6	N/A
2014-15	IBA	0	7	6th of 6
