= Holland Dream =

- Founded: 2005
- League: IBL (2005-11); IBA (2012-present)
- Team history: Holland Blast (2005-11); Holland Dream (2012-present)
- Based in: Holland, Michigan
- Arena: Holland Civic Center (2005-present)
- Owner: Fast Forward Sports, LLC
- Head coach: Teddy Davis
- Championships: 0

The Holland Dream was a semi-professional basketball team in the Independent Basketball Association based in Holland, Michigan. The team began as the Holland Blast, and changed its name when the team entered the IBA. The team was last owned by Tom Moore. The Dream played at the Holland Civic Center, former home of Hope College, who moved into the new DeVos Fieldhouse. They were members of the International Basketball League from 2005 to 2011.

== History ==
The Holland Blast produced two IBL Hall of Fame players:

- Jared Bledsoe, a 6'2" guard originally from Memphis, averaged a league-best, 43 points per game in the 2006 IBL playoffs and is the Holland Blast all-time leading scorer. The 6’2” guard scored a career and IBL playoff high 49 points vs Elkhart Express in the IBL Semifinals Playoffs. He was twice an All-NSIC selection while playing at Moorhead State University, Bledsoe accepted the women's assistant coach position at Concordia College in 2012.
- Dennis Springs from Toledo, Ohio. Ranked 3rd in the IBL in scoring at 27.9 points per game and 1st in the IBL in Assists with 10.9 assist per game.

Both have enjoyed successful careers playing basketball overseas.

Former assistant coach Terry Smith took over as head coach for the 2007 season after Mike Ahrens submitted his resignation.

Coach Smith was Grand Valley State University’s Men's Basketball Coach from 1997-2004 where he won 110 games. Smith has received many professional honors including the 1996 NABC Coach of the Year.

== Season by season ==
Regular Season
Year	Wins	Losses	Division	Playoffs
2006	14	8	4th	Lost in semifinals
2007	10	12	4th	
2009	15	4	1st	
2010	7	9	5th	
2012-13 Fall	4	12	7th	DNQ

== IBL All-Stars ==
=== 2006 ===
- Jared Bledsoe
- James Jackson
- Dennis Springs

=== 2007 ===
- Jared Bledsoe
- Dennis Springs
