= Logan Vander Velden =

American basketball player (born 1971)

Personal information
- Born: April 3, 1971 (age 55) Valders, Wisconsin, U.S.
- Listed height: 6 ft 8 in (2.03 m)
- Listed weight: 215 lb (98 kg)

Career information
- High school: Valders (Valders, Wisconsin)
- College: Green Bay (1990–1994)
- NBA draft: 1994: undrafted
- Playing career: 1995–2006
- Position: Small forward
- Number: 25

Career history

Playing
- 1995: Memphis Fire
- 1995–1996: Los Angeles Clippers
- 1996: Connecticut Pride
- 1996–1997, 1998–2000: Fort Wayne Fury
- 2000–2001: Atletico Queluz
- 2004–2005: Cincinnati Monarchs
- 2005: Deportes Castro
- 2005: Gaiteros del Zulia
- 2005–2006: Battle Creek Knights

Coaching
- 2006–2008: Battle Creek Knights
- Stats at NBA.com
- Stats at Basketball Reference

Logan Vander Velden (born April 3, 1971) is an American former professional basketball player. He was a member of the 1995–96 Los Angeles Clippers team for 15 games. Born in Valders, Wisconsin, Vander Velden attended high school in his home town, and played basketball for the Green Bay Phoenix at the University of Wisconsin–Green Bay.
