= Marysville Meteors =

- Founded: 2006
- League: IBL 2006-2007
- Team history: Columbus Cyclones; 2006; Marysville Meteors; 2007
- Based in: Marysville
- Arena: Westerville North High School Gymnasium; 2006; Marysville High School Gymnasium; 2007
- Colors: Red, Yellow, & Black
- Owner: Charlie Mitchell
- Head coach: Shaun Smith
- Championships: None
- Dancers: Meteorites

The Marysville Meteors were a professional basketball team located in Marysville, Ohio, United States.

== 2006 season ==
The Meteors played with the Columbus Cyclones nickname during the 2006 season, all home games were played at Westerville North High School. The team finished 20–3, and played in the IBL Championship Game, where they lost to the Elkhart Express 119–108 in overtime. The team was led in scoring by Michael Brownlee(21.7 ppg), and also featured Paul Haynes(18.8 ppg). Both were all-stars. The team averaged roughly 1,000 fans per game that first season.

== 2007 season ==
According to a press release, the Cyclones would be moving to Marysville, Ohio for their 2007 season. Coached by former OSU Buckeye Shaun Smith, the Meteors continued to dominate the league. Esteban Weaver lead the Meteors in scoring, with 33.2 ppg in 13 games, not enough to appear on the IBL leader board. Micheal Brownlee also contributed, with 25.2 ppg, good for tenth in the IBL.

== Roster & coaching staff ==
Roster for the 2007 season

Marsyville Meteors; Current Roster
G	6'1	#	Michael Brownlee Jr.	(Charleston)
F	6'6	#	Kenny Chaffin	(Mount Vernon Nazarene)
G	6'3	#	Kendrick Cornelius	(Indiana Tech)
F	6'7	#	John Davis	(Tarleton State)
G	6'5	#	Larry Drake	(Miami (OH))
G	6'2	#	Chris Dunn	(West Virginia State)
G	6'1	#	Adrick Hicks	(Bethel (IN))
F	6'6	#	Shun Jenkins	(Ohio State)
G	6'4	#	Ish Kamara	(California (PA))
G	6'1	#	J.P. Maszczak	(Westminster (PA))
G	6'5	#	Belgium Deon Rose	(Missouri Southern State)
G	6'3	#	Justus Thigpen	(Iowa State)
C	6'8	#	Aaron Turner	(Xavier (OH))
F	6'8	#	Omari Wesley	(Cleveland State)

Marsyville Meteors; Coaching Staff
Head coach	Shaun Smith
Assistant head coach	Lamont Tillman

== Season by season ==
Regular Season
Year	Wins	Losses	Percentage	Division
2006	20	3	.869	2nd - East Division
2007	20	5	.800	2nd - East Division

== All-Stars ==
=== 2006 ===
As Columbus Cyclones

- Michael Brownlee
- Paul Haynes

=== 2007 ===
- Mike Brownlee
- Larry Drake
- Aaron Turner
