= Salem Sabres =

- Founded: 2012
- Folded: 2014
- League: IBL (2013-2014); ABA (2012)
- Team history: Salem Sabres; 2012-2014
- Based in: Salem, Oregon
- Arena: Chemeketa Community College
- Colors: Purple and black
- Owner: C. Neiman Sports, Inc.
- Head coach: Willie Freeman
- Championships: 0
- Website: http://www.ibl.com/salem_sabres/

The Salem Sabres were a professional men's basketball based in Salem, Oregon. They were last members of the International Basketball League and began play in the league in 2012. The team was owned by C. Neiman Sports, Inc. and the team's general manager was Joe Becerra. They played their home games at Chemeketa Community College. They joined the league after playing one season in the American Basketball Association. After the 2014 season they folded along with the league.
