= Las Vegas Stars (USBL) =

- Leagues: International Basketball League; 2007-2008; United States Basketball League; 2025–present
- Founded: 2007
- Location: Las Vegas, Nevada
- Team colors: Gold, Black
- General manager: Cliff Levingston
- Head coach: Cliff Levingston
- Championships: IBL 1st Place Southwest Champions 2008

The Las Vegas Stars are a professional basketball team in the United States Basketball League. The inaugural head coach and GM is Cliff Levingston.

== History ==
The Las Vegas Stars was a professional basketball team in the International Basketball League. The inaugural head coach was George Tarkanian, son of Hall of Fame college coach Jerry Tarkanian. The CEO/General Manager, Alexis Levi-Scott, became the first African American female owner in professional basketball when she purchased the team. After the 2008 International Basketball League season the team became defunct.

The team was revived and joined the United States Basketball League in 2026.

== Season by season ==
Regular Season
Year	Wins	Losses	Percentage	Division
2007	12	5	.705	2nd - Midwest Division
2008	10	10	.500	2nd - Southwest Division

== 2008 roster ==
'Final 2007-08 Roster'

Head Coach: Dan Savage

Assistant Coach: Mike Meister

#		Pos.	Ht.	Player	Acquired	College
	(United States)	F	6'5	Corey Bailey	2008	UNLV
	(United States)	G/F	6'3	Demario Butler	2008	Azusa Pacific University
	(Guinea)	C	6'11	Mohammed Camara	2008	San Diego State
3	(United States)	G	6'1	Hollis Hale	2007	Concordia
1	(United States)	G	6'0	Willie Hall	2007	Augusta G.
5	(United States)	G/F	6'4	Julius Johnson	2008	Chabot CC
10	(United States)	F	6'7	Elliott Magee	2008	Texas A&M
	(United States)	G/F	6'5	Demetrius Orme	2008	CSU Bakersfield
2	(United States)	G	6'2	Keena Payton	2008	Fresno City JC
	(United States)	G/F	6'4	Mike Scott	2008	Chabot CC
8	(Canada)	G	6'3	Eddie Shelby	2007	CSU Bakersfield

The Las Vegas Stars completed this season in first place in the Southwest Division.

== 2007 roster ==
'Final 2006-07 Roster'

Head Coach: Dan Savage

#		Pos.	Ht.	Player	Acquired	College
	(United States)	F/C	6'8	Vinzant Deveraux	2007
	(United States)	G/F	6'5	Herb Gibson	2007	Michigan
3	(United States)	G	6'1	Hollis Hale	2007	Concordia
1	(United States)	G	6'0	Willie Hall	2007
8	(Canada)	G	6'3	Eddie Shelby	2007	CSU Bakersfield
23	(United States)	G/F	6'5	DaJuan Tate	2007	Mountain State
	(United States)	G	5'11	Maurice Thomas	2007	UTEP
4	(United States)	F	6'5	Jonathan Walker	2007
	(United States)	G	6'7	Tarron Williams	2007	Cal State San Bernardino
	(United States)	F	6'6	Matthew Winans	2007	Brigham Young University–Hawaii
