= Dayton Jets =

Basketball team in Dayton, Ohio

The Dayton Jets were a team in the International Basketball League based in Dayton, Ohio. The team made the championship game their first year.

In the team's first season, the Jets were coached by former Ohio State University standout Mark Baker. Baker returned as coach for the 2006 season. Home games were played at Hara Arena, but at the end of the season, the league forced them to look for a smaller venue. The Jets settled on Colonel White High School. The Jets were undefeated at home.

None of the team's players made the league's top 25 in scoring. The Jets were led by Dubrey Black with 19.2 ppg. Black was an all-star, along with Brooks Hall, Carl Edwards, and Michael Brownlee. The Jets were 15-2, losing only to the Mahoning Valley Wildcats during the regular season. The Battle Creek Knights defeated the Jets 124-121.

The Jets did not play at the Hara Arena or Colonel White High School in 2006. The team played their first two home games at Trotwood-Madison High School, and were looking for other area venues for their second season.

In 2006, the Dayton Jets became a non-profit organization.
