= Akron Cougars =

- Founded: 2005
- League: IBL 2005-2006; UBL 2007-2007
- Team history: Cuyahoga Falls Cougars; 2005-2006; Akron Cougars; 2006-present
- Based in: Akron, Ohio
- Arena: Cuyahoga Falls High School Gymnasium; 2005-2006; TBA 2006-present
- Colors: Dark red, yellow and orange
- Owner: Marc J. Cook
- Head coach: Lee Cotton(2006), Tom Vilk(2006), Lee Cotton(2007-)
- Championships: 0

The Akron Cougars are a professional men's minor league basketball team, members of the upstart Universal Basketball League, based in Akron, Ohio.

== 2006 Season ==
Former Cuyahoga Falls Cougars logo

The Cougars formed in 2005 as the Cuyahoga Falls Cougars (playing at Cuyahoga Falls High School (capacity: 3,300) and practicing at the Cuyahoga Falls Natatorium) and begun their inaugural IBL season in March 2006. They were led by head coach Lee Cotton, who formerly coached LeBron James at St. Vincent-St.Mary High School in Akron, Ohio; he was replaced later in the season by General Manager Tom Vilk. The team finished 6–14.

== Akron Cougars/Oblivion ==
The team announced that they would be relocating to Akron, Ohio for the 2007 season, replacing the previously announced Akron Quakers. Soon after, the team announced a move to the Universal Basketball League. However, given the state of the Universal Basketball League today, and given the recent announcement of the Akron Energy, a new IBL team headed by Marc Cook, it appears as though the Cougars are defunct.
