= National Athletic Basketball League =

National Athletic Basketball League (NABL)
- Sport: Basketball
- Founded: 2010
- Folded: 2013
- Country: United States
- Continent: FIBA Americas (Americas)
- Last champion: Portland Showtime

The National Athletic Basketball League (NABL) was a men's semi-professional basketball league featuring teams from the West Coast of the United States. The league was founded by Nathan Mumm and Joe Becerra. The NABL was an owner controlled league, which enabled the owners to vote on all aspects of the business.

== History ==
The 2010 NABL season saw six teams competing: Portland Showtime, Salem Stampede, Snohomish County Explosion, Seattle Aviators/Mountaineers, Tacoma Thunder and Tualatin Rainmakers. On May 25, 2010, the Mountaineers withdrew from the NABL mid-season to join the ABA, citing "The NABL was not a good fit for our organization, and we need to go in another direction." The 2010 NABL Finals were contested between the Portland Showtime and the Salem Stampede, with the Showtime winning the best-of-three series 2–0 to claim the inaugural championship.

League play was cancelled for the 2011 season, with exhibition games replacing the schedule as the league was being revised.

In September 2011, a group of investors from the Portland area known as Productive Citizens Incorporated purchased the league from its founder Nathan Mumm. The 2012 NABL season was scheduled to begin in April with at least nine teams: Portland Showtime, Salem Stampede, Seattle Aviators, Snohomish Explosion, Tacoma Undertakers, Tualatin Black Barons and Washington Sabers. However, the 2012 season never went ahead, and the NABL ceased operations.

== 2010 All-Star Weekend ==
=== Washington All-Stars ===
- Chris Weakley (Snohomish County Explosion)
- Shawn Wolters (Snohomish County Explosion)
- Chris Ferguson (Snohomish County Explosion)
- Jason Hicks (Snohomish County Explosion)
- Chris Keller (Seattle Mountaineers)
- Rashad Powell (Seattle Mountaineers)
- Jamaal Miller (Seattle Mountaineers)
- Brian Spielman (Seattle Mountaineers)
- Nate Jackson (Tacoma Thunder)
- Jason Stromvall (Tacoma Thunder)
- Brandon Larrieu (Tacoma Thunder)
- Head Coach: Don Sims (Seattle Mountaineers)

=== Oregon All-Stars ===
- Chris Hoyt (Tualatin Rainmakers)
- Doug Lamb (Tualatin Rainmakers)
- Frantz Dorsainvil (Tualatin Rainmakers)
- Terrence Twotwo (Portland Showtime)
- Mac Hopson (Portland Showtime) – All-Star Game MVP
- Dominic Waters (Portland Showtime)
- Seth Tarver (Portland Showtime)
- Jeremiah Dominguez (Salem Stampede)
- Mike Tabb (Salem Stampede)
- Cameron Mitchell (Salem Stampede)
- Jeff Dunn (Salem Stampede)
- Antone Jarrell (Salem Stampede)
- Head Coach: Paul Kelly (Portland Showtime)

=== Slam Dunk Contest ===
- Shawn Wolters (Snohomish County Explosion)
- Jalonta Martin (Portland Showtime)
- Brandon Larrieu (Tacoma Thunder)
- Rashad Powell (Seattle Mountaineers)
- Tavar Nesbitt (Tualatin Rainmakers)
- Mike Tabb (Salem Stampede)

Shawn Wolters was the eventual winner.

=== Three-Point Contest ===
- Anthony Lackey (Portland Showtime)
- Chris Ferguson (Snohomish County Explosion)
- Chris Weakley (Snohomish County Explosion)
- Nate Jackson (Tacoma Thunder)
- Jason Stromvall (Tacoma Thunder)
- Jeff Dunn (Salem Stampede)
- Jeremiah Dominguez (Salem Stampede)
- Chris Keller (Seattle Mountaineers)
- Jamaal Miller (Seattle Mountaineers)
- Jaxin Skyward (Tualatin Rainmakers)
- Cody Tesoro (Tualatin Rainmakers)

Jason Stromvall was the eventual winner.

== 2010 award winners ==
- Most Valuable Player: Mac Hopson (Portland Showtime)
- Defensive Player of the Year: Mike Tabb (Salem Stampede)
- Sixth Man of the Year: Chris Ferguson (Snohomish County Explosion)
- Coach of the Year: Paul Kelly (Portland Showtime)
- Executive of the Year: Joe Becerra (Salem Stampede)
- All-NABL First Team:
  - F: Cameron Mitchell (Salem Stampede)
  - F: Terrence Twotwo (Portland Showtime)
  - F: Mike Tabb (Salem Stampede)
  - G: Chris Weakley (Snohomish County Explosion)
  - G: Mac Hopson (Portland Showtime)
- All-NABL Second Team:
  - F: Antone Jarrell (Salem Stampede)
  - F: Anthony Lackey (Portland Showtime)
  - F: Shawn Wolter (Snohomish County Explosion)
  - G: Jason Hicks (Snohomish County Explosion)
  - G: Dominic Waters (Portland Showtime)
- All-NABL Third Team:
  - F: Villi Dorsainvil (Tualatin Rainmakers)
  - F: Willie Freemann (Salem Stampede)
  - F: Seth Tarver (Portland Showtime)
  - G: Jason Stromvall (Tacoma Thunder)
  - G: Nate Jackson (Tacoma Thunder)

== See also ==
- List of developmental and minor sports leagues
