= Tacoma Jets =

- Founded: 2005
- League: IBL (2005-07); NABL (2010)
- Team history: Tacoma Thunder; 2005–2006; Tacoma Jets; 2007; Tacoma Thunder; 2010
- Based in: Tacoma, Washington
- Arena: Clover Park High School; 2005; Mount Tahoma High School; 2006; Tacoma Christian Center; 2007
- Owner: Christian Holden
- Head coach: Arvin Chris Mosley Jr
- Championships: 0

The Tacoma Thunder were an International Basketball League team based in Tacoma, Washington. The Tacoma Jets were named the Tacoma Thunder for their first two campaigns, but were renamed in the off-season after an ownership change to the Jets. The Tacoma Thunder rejoined the National Athletic Basketball League in 2010 for the NABL's first season.

== History ==
=== 2005 ===
Former logo

The Thunder had an impressive inaugural campaign, leading the west with a 12–6 record. However, due to the IBL's inaugural season playoff setup, the team was denied a spot in the championship game. They were led by IBL All-Stars Dontay Harris, Jimmy Haywood and Lamar Morinia. PG Chris Hyppa led the IBL with 10.6 assists per game.

=== 2006 ===
Being a returning team was no help to the Thunder as their record was worse in 2006, 11-11. Three expansion teams placed higher than the Thunder did. The team was led by two high-scoring all-stars, Kenny Tate(25.1 ppg), and Lamar Morinia(23.6 ppg).

=== 2007 ===
It was announced by the IBL that the Thunder had changed hands and would now be known as the Jets, promising a new focus for the team. Inexplicably, the franchise was removed from the IBL website, having been replaced by the Tacoma Jazz. The Jazz of Tacoma is off to an 0–2 start but have yet to play a game with their full squad. Marlon Bailey and PG Chris Hyppa are currently rehabilitating injuries and should be back soon. IBL All-Star Lamar Morinia will join the team once his season in Germany concludes.

The Jazz of Tacoma struggled through coaching changes and an instability of players in 2007. The team finished 5-17 and chose not to participate in the Western Conference Playoffs. Once again, Dontay Harris was the anchor as he averaged 20.1ppg. Guards Michael Claxton and Lorenzo Rollins were also consistent performers as they both averaged over 18ppg.

=== 2010 ===
The Tacoma Thunder returned to the town for basketball in the 2010 in a new league with a new head coach Doug Hockenbury and new venue. In May 2010, player of the month Jason Stomvall averaged 34ppg and 14rpg and received All-League third team honors along with teammate Nate Jackson.

== Standings ==
Regular Season
Year	Wins	Losses	Percentage	League	Division
2005	12	6	.666	4th - IBL	1st - Western Division
2006	11	11	.500	T-8th - IBL	T-6th - Western Division

== Related Links/Sources ==
www.na-bl.com - Team's official website
