= Whatcom Community College =

Public college in Bellingham, Washington, US

Coordinates: 48°47′43″N 122°29′38″W

- Type: Public community college
- Established: 1967
- President: Justin Guillory
- Administrative staff: 1071 employees
- Students: 11,457
- Location: Bellingham, Washington, United States
- Campus: 72 acres
- Colors: Burgundy and blue
- Mascot: Orca
- Website: www.whatcom.edu

Whatcom Community College (WCC or Whatcom) is a public community college in Bellingham, Washington, United States, in Whatcom County. It was established in 1967 and is accredited by the Northwest Commission on Colleges and Universities.

== Academics ==
Whatcom offers transfer degrees, professional and technical training programs, basic education, job skills, online courses, and Community & Continuing Education classes.

== Campus ==
WCC's 72-acre campus, located in north Bellingham, is made up of 13 buildings: Auxiliary Services Building, Baker Hall, Cascade Hall, Cedar Hall, Foundation Building, Health Professions Education Center, Heiner Center, Kelly Hall, Kulshan Hall, Laidlaw Center, Pavilion, Roe Studio, and Syre Student Center.

== Athletics ==
WCC competes in the Northern Region of the Northwest Athletic Conference (NWAC). WCC has intercollegiate teams in three sports: men's and women's soccer, women's volleyball and men's and women's basketball. Soccer and volleyball seasons begin in September and end in late November. Basketball begins in mid-November and runs through the end of February. All of the Orcas' home games are held in either the Pavilion or the Orca athletic field on campus.

== Honors ==
In October 2014, the National Security Agency and Department of Homeland Security designated Whatcom Community College as a national center of academic excellence in information assurance and cyber defense. WCC is among the first community colleges in the nation to earn this distinction. In 2021, WCC was designated one of the National Science Foundation (NSF) Advanced Technological Education National Cybersecurity Centers. This will allow students to be fast tracked from academics to employment in cybersecurity and to train WCC's cybersecurity faculty.

WCC's auxiliary services building earned LEED Silver certification for its sustainable design elements. The building, which opened in spring 2013, is home to the campus facilities department and the copy, print and mail center.
