= Elkhart Express =

American basketball team

- Founded: 2006
- League: IBL 2006-2008
- Team history: Elkhart Express; 2006-2008
- Based in: Elkhart, Indiana
- Arena: North Side Gymnasium; 2006-2008; TBA 2010
- Colors: Black, Royal Blue & Trophy Gold
- Owner: Pro Basketball Elkhart, LLC
- President: Daimon Beathea
- Head coach: Daimon Beathea
- Championships: 2 (2006, 2007)
- Dancers: LocoMotion
- Mascot: Ernie Express

The Elkhart Express were an International Basketball League team based in Elkhart, Indiana. The team won the 2006 and 2007 IBL championships. The Express officially released that they were folding on January 5, 2009. On January 18, 2010, head coach and founder Daimon Beathea announced that the team would return for the 2010 season, but gym agreements had not been finalized.

== 2006 season ==
The Express played home games at North Side Gym in Elkhart, which was the home for the IBL Championship and All-Star game. The Express dominated the league for most of the season, and crowds of over 2,000 were routine. At home, the Express won the championship 119–108 over the Columbus Cyclones.

== Roster ==
2008 Elkhart Express roster
Players

Pos.	No.	Player	Height	Weight	DOB	From
F	43	Byron Allen	6 ft 7 in (2.01 m)	275 lb (125 kg)		Northwestern State
G	23	Mike Brownlee	6 ft 2 in (1.88 m)			College of Charleston
G	15	Coleco Buie	6 ft 5 in (1.96 m)			Missouri State
C	32	Chris Charles	7 ft 1 in (2.16 m)			Villanova
G	1	Lincoln Glass				Auburn Montgomery
F	33	Marques Lewis	6 ft 8 in (2.03 m)	265 lb (120 kg)		UAB
F/C	45	Jarrod Lovette	6 ft 10 in (2.08 m)		1977	Marquette
G	11	Prentice McGruder	6 ft 2 in (1.88 m)			California
G	5	Cedric Moodie	6 ft 2 in (1.88 m)			Ball State
G	3	Tim Pledger	5 ft 9 in (1.75 m)			Delta State
G	2	Ron Timus	6 ft 5 in (1.96 m)			Morgan State
C	55	James Tyler	7 ft 3 in (2.21 m)			Patterson Academy (OH)

Coaches
Head coach
- (United States) Daimon Beathea (Michigan State)
Assistant(s)
- (United States) Ramsey Nichols (Albion)
- (United States) William Coatie (Illinois Valley CC)

Legend
- (DP) Unsigned draft pick
- (FA) Free agent
- (S) Suspended
- Injured

Roster

== Season-by-season ==
Regular Season
Year	Wins	Losses	Percentage	Division
2006	23	2	.920	1st - East Division
2007	23	4	.846	1st - East Division

2006 and 2007 IBL Champions

== All-stars ==
=== 2006 ===
- Eric Brand
- Cedric Moodie

=== 2007 ===
- Coleco Buie
- Cedric Moodie
- Tim Pledger
