= Seattle Mountaineers =

- League: IBL (2006; 2009); NABL (2010); ABA (2010–present)
- Founded: 2005
- History: Seattle Mountaineers; 2006–present
- Arena: Everett Community College
- Location: Everett, Washington
- Team colors: silver, orange, yellow, black, white
- President: Don Sims
- Head coach: Don Sims
- Ownership: Don Sims
- Championships: 0
- Website: Seattle Mountaineers

The Seattle Mountaineers are a semi-professional basketball club and a member of the American Basketball Association (ABA). They are currently a touring exhibition team that plays against junior and community colleges within the United States and Canada. After four years as an IBL franchise, the Mountaineers jumped to the ABA in 2010 and applied and received non-profit status. Team owner, president and head coach is Don Sims. The club's stated goal is to provide "an inclusive, Christian-based experience" and teach players the benefits of competition and understand its redemptive value.

== History ==
The Mountaineers were established in 2005 and began play in the 2006 IBL season. After sitting out 2007 and 2008, the Mountaineers returned to the IBL for the 2009 season.

In 2010, the Mountaineers joined the NABL for the competition's inaugural season. Seattle Mountaineers basketball team subsequently entered the ABA's Pacific Far West division and finished the 2009–10 season with a 16–11 record.

== Season-by-season ==
Season	Record
2011–12	26–7
2012–13	17–5
2013–14	20–8
2014–15	15–5
2015–16	26–6
2016–17	13–6
2017–18	9–7
2018–19	13–12
2019–20	14–6
2021–22	10–8
2022–23	12–5
2023–24	8–7
2024–25	6–8

Source: Don Sims bio
