= International Basketball League =

Sport's league

International Basketball League (IBL)
- International Basketball League logo
- Sport: Basketball
- Founded: August 2004; 21 years ago
- First season: 2005
- Folded: 2014
- No. of teams: 13
- Countries: United States
- Continent: FIBA Americas (Americas)
- Last champion: Bellingham Slam (2014)
- Most titles: Bellingham Slam (4)
- Website: www.ibl.com

The International Basketball League (IBL) was a semi-professional men's basketball league featuring teams from the West Coast of the United States. In 2010 the Albany Legends became the first team in the Northeastern United States to join. The IBL also sometimes featured teams from China and Japan which temporarily relocated to the United States for the IBL season. The IBL season typically ran from the end of March through July.

== History ==
Founded by Portland area sports promoter Mikal Duilio, the league featured rules designed to create a fast-paced, high-scoring brand of basketball. Duilio first began planning for the league with a series of test games in Portland and Seattle in November 2003. These games featured a mixture of traditional college and NBA rules, plus two rules created specifically for the league:

- The "Immediate Inbound" Rule: After a made basket, the referee threw the ball to a nearby player from the team which had been scored on, instead of a player throwing in the ball from under the basket, to eliminate wasted time.
- A 22-second shot clock was used instead of the NBA's 24-seconds. A defensive non-shooting foul or kicked ball reset it to 12.

The test games proved popular and resulted in the founding of the IBL in August 2004. Founded with eight teams, the league expanded to 17 by the start of the season in April 2005. Each team played approximately 20 regular season games, most of them centered on their home region, with the teams with the two best records playing in a championship game at the end of the season. The Battle Creek Knights won the inaugural title by going undefeated in the regular season and beating the Dayton Jets in the finals.

In the league's first year, the up-tempo rules resulted in the average team scoring 126.9 points per game, nearly 30 points more than the NBA team average in 2004–05, and slightly higher than the NBA record for points per game by a team in a single season, set by the Denver Nuggets in 1981–82.

In 2010, the league launched a winter season which saw nine different teams compete. Four teams played an entire schedule and thus made them eligible for the playoffs.

In July 2011, Duilio sold the league to Vancouver, Washington, businessman Bryan Hunter. Sharleen Graf was appointed as the league's new commissioner.

In March 2014 the IBL ceased operation as an independent entity and combined with the West Coast Basketball League (WCBL). Teams were split into an International Conference and Continental Conference based on geography.

== Teams ==
International Conference Team	City, State	Arena	Founded	Joined
Bellingham Slam	Bellingham, WA	Whatcom Pavilion	2005	2007
Lone Star Strikers	Conroe, TX	Oak Ridge High School	2013	
Olympia Reign	Olympia, WA	Little Creek Casino	2008	
Portland Chinooks	Beaverton, OR	Eastmoreland Courts	2009	
Salem Sabres	Salem, OR	Chemeketa Community College	2013	
Seattle Flight	Seattle, WA	North Seattle Community College Wellness Center	2013	
Vancouver Volcanoes	Vancouver, WA	O'Connell Sports Center	2005	
Continental Conference Team	City, State	Arena	Founded	Joined
Hollywood Shooting Stars	Hollywood, California		2012	2014
Los Angeles Team Macleem	Los Angeles, California	Mt. Carmel Recreation Center	2014	2014
Malibu Beachdogs	Mailibu, California		2014	2014
Santa Barbara Breakers	Santa Barbara, California	Santa Barbara City College	2006	2014
Santa Monica Jump	Santa Monica, California		2012	2014
Venice Beach Warriors	Venice Beach, California		2013	2014

=== Joined other leagues ===
- Akron Cougars (joined the Universal Basketball League. The league folded before the first season.)
- Battle Creek Knights (joined the Independent Basketball Association)
- Dayton Air Strikers (rejoined the Premier Basketball League)
- Gary Splash (joined the Independent Basketball Association
- Holland Blast (joined the Independent Basketball Association)
- Lake County All-Stars (joined the Independent Basketball Association)
- Lansing Capitals (joined the Independent Basketball Association)
- Kankakee County Soldiers (left to form the Independent Basketball Association)
- Salem Stampede (joined the National Athletic Basketball League)
- Santa Barbara Breakers (joined the West Coast Pro Basketball League)
- Snohomish County Explosion (joined the National Athletic Basketball League)
- Washington Raptors (joined the American Basketball Association)
- West Virginia Wild (joined the National Professional Basketball League, then the American Basketball Association)

=== Teams history ===
- Akron Cougars (2007), as Cuyahoga Falls Cougars (2005–06)
- Akron Energy (2007)
- Akron Lightning (2005)
- Albany Legends (2010–11)
- Arizona Flame (2008–09), as Scottsdale Flame (2007); as Phoenix Flame (2007)
- Arizona Lightning (2007)
- Arizona Raptors (2010), as Phoenix Red Rock Raptors (2009)
- Aurora Cavalry (2006)
- Battle Creek Knights (2005–08, 2010-11)
- BC Titans (2010), as Vancouver Titans (2008–09)
- Bellingham Slam (2008–2014); migrated to Seattle Pro-Am
- Cedar Valley Jaguars (2005–06)
- Chicago Steam (2009)
- Chico Force (2005–07)
- Colorado Crossover (2006–07)
- Dayton Air Strikers (2011)
- Dayton Jets (2005–06)
- Des Moines Heat (2005)
- Detroit Pros (2005)
- Edmonton Chill (2008)
- Edmonton Energy (2009–12)
- Elgin Racers (2007–08), as Windy City Dawgs (2005–06)
- Elkhart Express (2006–08)
- Eugene Chargers (2006–07)
- Gary Splash (2010-11)
- Gary Steelheads (2008)
- Grand Rapids Flight (2005–09)
- Great Lakes All-Stars (2010)
- Holland Blast (2006–11)
- Hub City Hurricanes (2007)
- Jersey G-Force (2012–2014), as New Jersey Titans (2011)
- Kankakee County Soldiers (2009–11), as Windy City Soldiers (2008), as Chicago Heights Soldiers (2007)
- Lake County All-Stars (2010–11)
- Lake County Lakers (2006)
- Lansing Capitals (2006–07, 2010–11)
- Las Vegas Pride (2009–10), as Nevada Pride (2009)
- Las Vegas Stars (2007–08)
- L.A. Lightning (2008–2010)
- Macomb County Mustangs (2005–06)
- Mahoning Valley Wildcats (2005)
- Marysville Meteors (2007), as Columbus Cyclones (2006)
- Nippon Tornadoes (2008–09, 2012)
- Oakland Slammers (2005–06)
- Ohio Hidden Gems (2010)
- Olympia Reign (2008–2014)
- Orlando Venom (2012–2014), as Florida Winning Ways (2011)
- Portland Chinooks (2005–08; 2011–2014), as Oregon Waves (2009–11)
- Salem Stampede (2006–07)
- Salem Soldiers (2005–07; 2012)
- Santa Barbara Breakers (2007)
- Seattle Mountaineers (2006–07, 2009)
- Shaanxi Kylins (2008)
- Shanxi Zhongyu (2008–09)
- Snohomish County Explosion (2008–09), as Everett Explosion (2007)
- Tacoma Tide (2009–10)
- Tacoma Jazz (2007–08)
- Tacoma Jets (2007), as Tacoma Thunder (2005–06)
- Tri Valley Titans (2007), as Tri City Ballers (2006); as San Jose Ballers (2005)
- USA All-Stars (2008–2014)
- Vancouver Volcanoes (2005–2014); migrated to The Basketball League
- Washington Raptors (2007)
- West Coast High Flyers (2008)
- West Coast Hotshots (2005–2012), as Central Oregon Hotshots (2005–10)
- West Virginia Wild (2006)
- Yamhill High Flyers (2009–2012)

== Champions ==
Year	Champion	Score	Runner-up
2005	Battle Creek Knights	124-121	Dayton Jets
2006	Elkhart Express	119-108 (OT)	Columbus Cyclones
2007	Elkhart Express	113-109	Portland Chinooks
2008	Bellingham Slam	118-111	Elkhart Express
2009	Los Angeles Lightning	2-1 (best-of 3)	Oregon Waves
2010 Summer	Albany Legends	126-111	Bellingham Slam
2010 Winter	Kankakee County Soldiers	88-87	Gary Splash
2011	Vancouver Volcanoes	124-116	Edmonton Energy
2012	Bellingham Slam	142-109	Portland Chinooks
2013	Bellingham Slam	117-114	Vancouver Volcanoes
2014	Bellingham Slam	143-126	Vancouver Volcanoes

=== Wins by club ===
Team	Championships	Summer Seasons	Winter Seasons
Bellingham Slam	4	2008, 2012, 2013, 2014	
Elkhart Express	2	2006, 2007	
Battle Creek Knights	1	2005	
Los Angeles Lightning	1	2009	
Albany Legends	1	2010	
Kankakee County Soldiers	1		2010
Vancouver Volcanoes	1	2011	

== Notable people ==
=== Commissioners ===
- Mikal Duilio (2004–July 2011)
- Sharleen Graf (July 2011 – 2014)

=== Players ===
- Toby Bailey, former UCLA player and NCAA Champion; NBA player
- Tim Hardaway, former Golden State Warriors star
- David Jackson, former NBA and Euroleague player; former Oregon Duck
- Shawn Kemp, former Seattle SuperSonics star
- Lamond Murray, 13-year NBA veteran
- Dennis Rodman, former Chicago Bulls player and Naismith Memorial Basketball Hall of Fame member
- Bryon Russell, former Utah Jazz star
- Fred Vinson, former Seattle SuperSonics player and current NBA Assistant Coach
- Grayson Boucher American street ball player

=== Coaches ===
- Rob Ridnour, head coach of the Bellingham Slam and father of Seattle SuperSonics guard Luke Ridnour
- Logan Vander Velden, head coach of the Battle Creek Knights and former Los Angeles Clippers player

== See also ==
- USA All-Stars
