= St John's, Worcester =

Suburb of Worcester in Worcestershire, England

Coordinates: 52.188489°N 2.234536°W

St John's
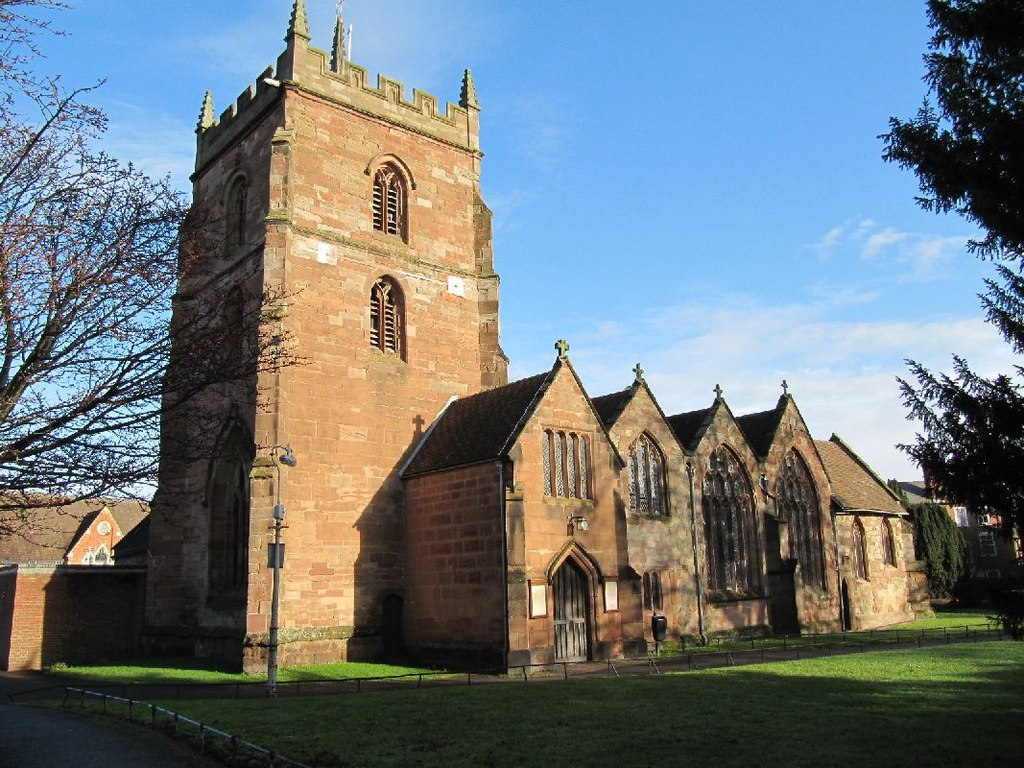
- St John's Church

- Location within Worcestershire
- Population: 8,982 2021 Census
  - London: 137 mi (220 km) SE
- District: Worcester
- Shire county: Worcestershire
- Region: West Midlands
- Country: England
- Sovereign state: United Kingdom
- Post town: Worcester
- Postcode district: WR2
- Dialling code: 01905
- Police: West Mercia
- Fire: Hereford and Worcester
- Ambulance: West Midlands
- UK Parliament: Worcester

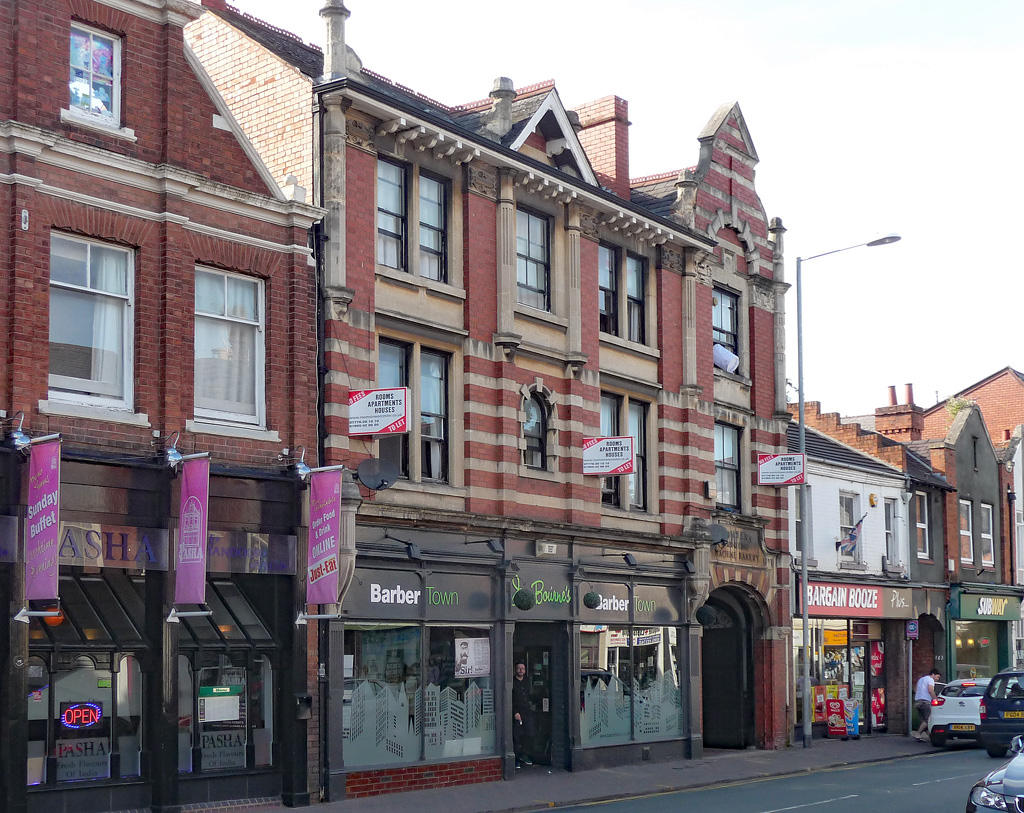
Shops typically found in St John's

St John's is a western suburb of Worcester in Worcestershire, England, lying west of the city centre and the River Severn. St. John's is referred to locally as the "Village in the City", which is partly due to being an independent township, before joining the city in 1837. There is still a sense of identity within the community.

The Ward of St. John constitutes one of the fifteen wards of the city. See map of Wards within Worcester City Council. St John borders the St. Clement Ward to the North, Cathedral Ward to the East and Bedwardine Ward. to the South. It adjoins the Civil Parish of Broadheath to the West. The A44 runs through the area and is the most direct route from Worcester City Centre to Hereford. St John's is roughly 1.2 km (1,300 yards) West of the city centre. It comprises the area surrounding St John's Church, a short part of Bromyard Road, Bransford Road and Bromwich Lane. However; the area West of the River Severn is often wholly referred to as St John's, therefore encompassing the university, the Worcestershire County Cricket Club ground and Cripplegate Park.

== Toponymy ==
The name St John's probably derives from the Saint John the Baptist; the parish name is 'St John-in-Bedwardine' which refers to the Baptist.

== History ==
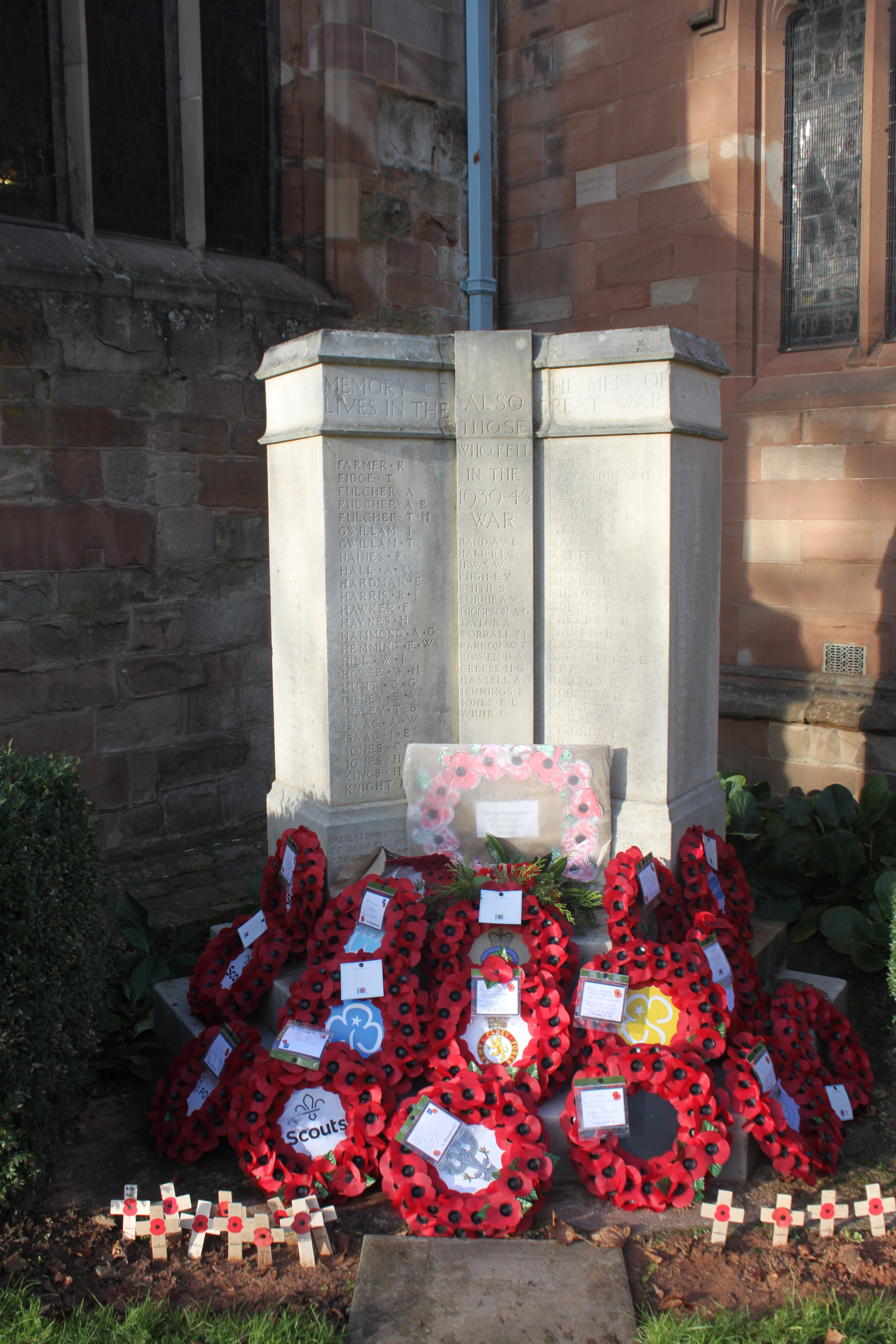
St John in Bedwardine War Memorial, Worcester

St John's played a role in the English Civil War. The Parliamentary commander Fleetwood forced his way across the River Teme, to the south of the parish and successfully managed to force his way into St John's, pushing back Royalist forces. Parliamentary soldiers plundered the nearby parish church and set it on fire. The soldiers also used the church walls to sharpen their pikes and even today the scars are still visible on the sandstone. The tower was also used by the soldiers as an observation post, but the spire was shot off by cannon fire, most likely being hit by Cromwell's artillery bombardment on the city, from Red Hill and Perry Wood across the river on the western heights of the city. When the civil war was over, Parliament gave £80 towards its restoration.

Parts of the Parish church of St John in Bedwardine are dated to the late 12th century, although much of the church was rebuilt during the 19th century.

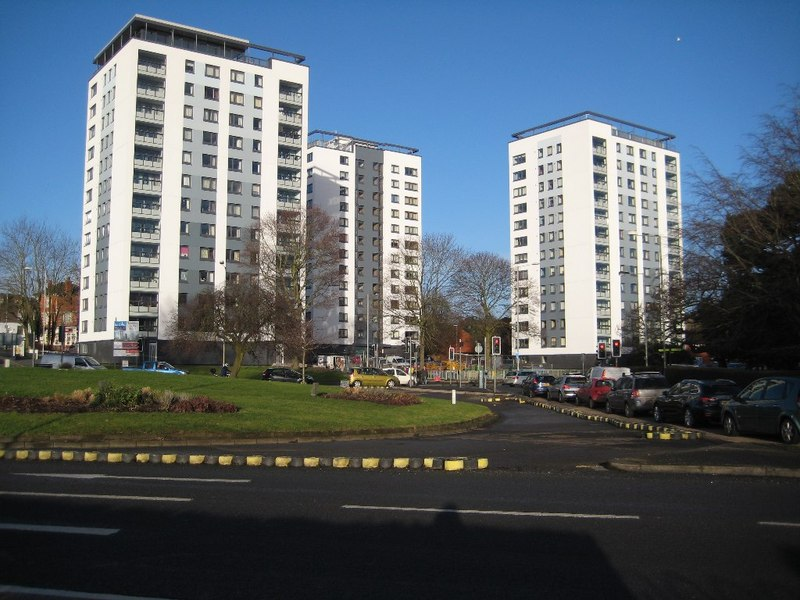
High Rise Flats in St John's, Worcester

St John's Parish was once an independent township having only been part of Worcester since 1837. St John's was able to expand and flourish because of its location on the roads leading from the city centre, westwards into Mid Wales. It was also situated close to the River Severn Bridge which was a very important crossing on the River Severn linking the city to Western areas of the country and other western towns, such as Hereford. This attracted many people to trade and settle in St John's. The parish also provided lodging for Welsh people trading with the city, who were not permitted to sleep on the streets within the city walls. The Parish was allowed its own fayre and bullring, maintaining its independence from the city. The bullring was located on the eastern side of the parish, outside the city walls. In the bullring, cattle were enraged before being slaughtered because this was believed to improve the quality of the meat.

In recent times, St John's has become home to a large student population, as a result of the increased growth of the University of Worcester. St John's was the first suburb of Worcester to have high-rise flats. These have recently (May 2015) been subject to a £5,000,000 visual overhaul to improve their aesthetics.

== Demography ==
The 2021 Census found that St John's is quite a diverse suburb of Worcester, it found that of the population at the 2021 Census, 93.9% is White British, followed by 2.2% Mixed, 1.8% Asian, and 1.5% Black. The area residents identifying as Christian was recorded at 50.8%, followed by 46.8% Irreligious, 1.1% Muslim and other religions were less than 1%.

== Transport ==
=== Walking/Cycling ===
Routes towards the city are commonly found with walks through Cripplegate Park previously via the subway, which has been closed for some years for security reasons, or past the Worcestershire County cricket ground and over the Worcester Bridge across the River Severn. Attractive views of Worcester Cathedral are obtained from the Worcester Bridge. Alternate routes include the Sabrina Bridge, which has undergone renovation during 2020, near the Worcester Arena.

=== Buses ===
There are many bus stops in St. John's and 3 public buses travel through the area. The No. 44 bus is operated by First Midlands and takes passengers from Crowngate Bus Station in Worcester to Malvern, Worcestershire. The 31, 31b and the 31c travel from the University of Worcester, to the city centre.

=== Railway Station ===
St. John's was formerly served by its railway station, situated on the Malvern and Hereford line. It also served trains on the now-defunct branch line to Bromyard. The station was called Henwick railway station, and was located on Henwick Road very near to St. Clement's church. It seems unlikely ever to reopen, as a nursing home was constructed on the former site at the beginning of the 21st century. The station was closed on 3 April 1965; the Signal Box and Level Crossing remain.

== Geography ==
=== Centre of the suburb ===
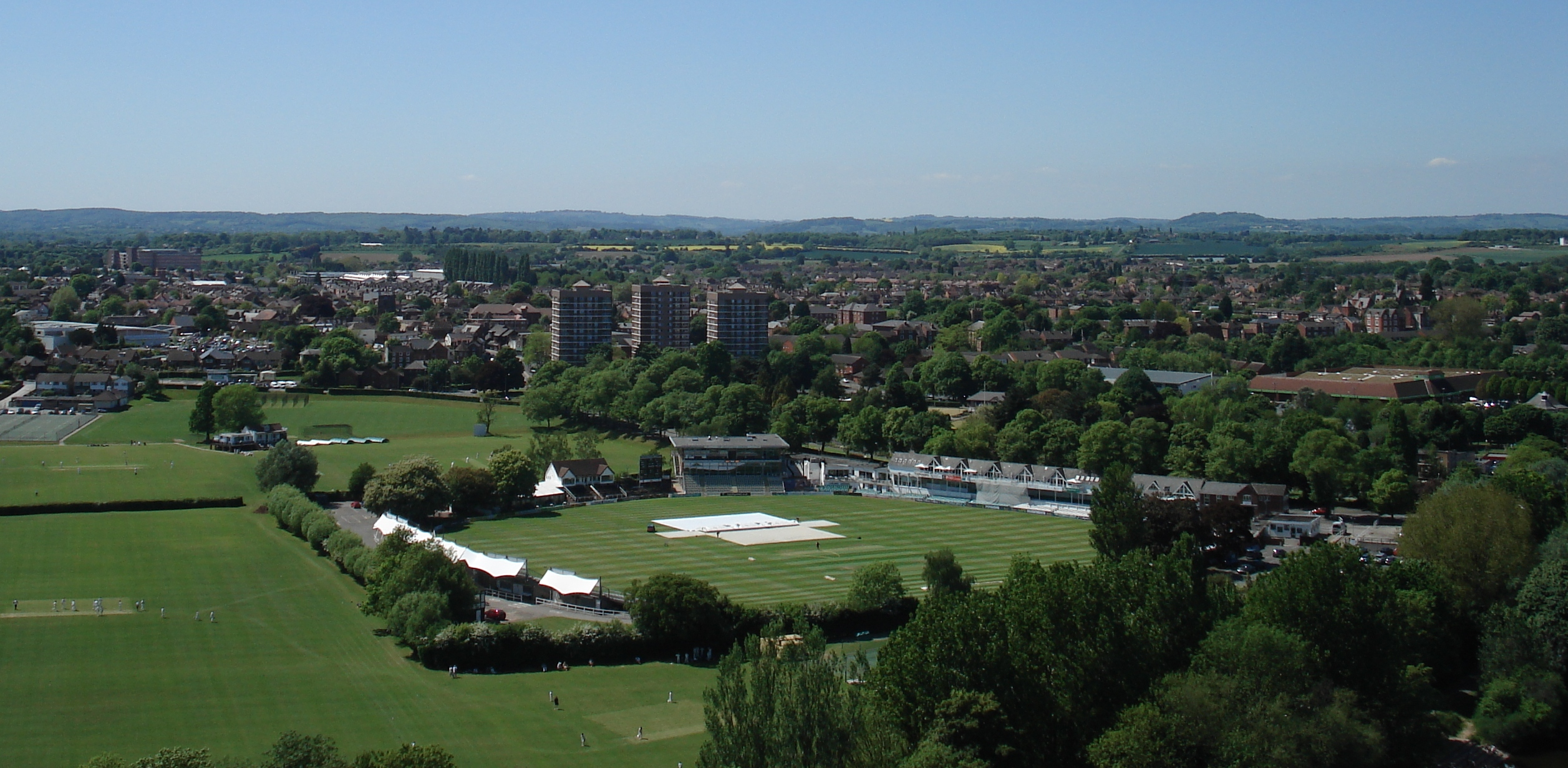
Skyline of St John's and Henwick

The heart of the suburb consists of one A road, the A44 which is known as the Bromyard Road and the B4206, Malvern Road. The B4485, Bransford Road joins Malvern Road. The A44 rises a little from New Road, avoiding the frequent flooding of the New Road cricket ground and adjacent sports fields. Road access to St John's was often cut by the flooding of New Road by the River Severn. Road works in (2018?) raised the level of New Road, maintaining access between Worcester City Centre and St John's. Larger buildings include a Sainsbury's and Aldi supermarket, three high-rise flats, a sports centre, a Catholic church a Church of England church, and a library. A post office, two dentists, a chiropractic clinic, several barbers, two butchers and many other independent shops will be found in the area. The last remaining bank in St John's, Lloyds, is scheduled to close in March 2021.

An important landmark is the Church of St John in Bedwardine which is the Church of England.

=== Climate ===
St John's enjoys a temperate climate with warm summers and mild winters generally. However, the area can experience more extreme weather and flooding around New Road is often a problem. During the winters of 2009–10 and 2010–11 the area experienced prolonged periods of sub-freezing temperatures and heavy snowfalls. The Severn, close to St John's, partially froze over in Worcester during this cold snap. In contrast, Worcester recorded 37 °C (98.6 °F) on 3 August 1990.

Climate data for Worcester
Month	Jan	Feb	Mar	Apr	May	Jun	Jul	Aug	Sep	Oct	Nov	Dec	Year
Mean daily maximum °C (°F)	8 (46)	9 (48)	11 (52)	14 (57)	18 (64)	20 (68)	23 (73)	23 (73)	19 (66)	15 (59)	11 (52)	7 (45)	15 (59)
Mean daily minimum °C (°F)	3 (37)	4 (39)	4 (39)	6 (43)	8 (46)	12 (54)	13 (55)	13 (55)	11 (52)	8 (46)	6 (43)	4 (39)	8 (46)
Average precipitation mm (inches)	63.2 (2.49)	51.2 (2.02)	46.5 (1.83)	77.7 (3.06)	45.9 (1.81)	52.3 (2.06)	43.3 (1.70)	53.9 (2.12)	63.4 (2.50)	93.3 (3.67)	69.5 (2.74)	77.8 (3.06)	738 (29.1)

== Leisure ==
=== Park ===
In 1878 a Public Health Act was passed by the city, declaring that land, now referred to as Cripplegate Park, would become a refuse tip followed by a recreation ground for the enjoyment of the public. In the 1940s a bowling green emerged and it has been maintained to the present day. Along the Bromyard Road there is a bowling alley.

There used to be a house at the park which was an odd shape, almost a circle. It had been a café, a library, issuing ration books and a clinic. It seemed to be the custodian of the park (which used to be its garden and before that its farmland). There was a paddling pool in the garden for the visitors to the park. The house and paddling pool were removed when the high-rise flats were built and the road layout was altered.

There are municipal tennis courts at the park and an interactive game.

The Worcester Music Festival is held there in August.

=== The Fountain ===
The Fountain was originally cast in 1858 by Hardy & Padmore and intended to relieve the heat in the market hall. Found to be leaking at a time when the hall needed thousands of pounds to repair it so it was not a priority, after a year's delay and for £300 it was re-erected in the park. It was restored in 2004 for £28,000 and the lion masks were replaced.

== Education ==
=== Primary schools ===
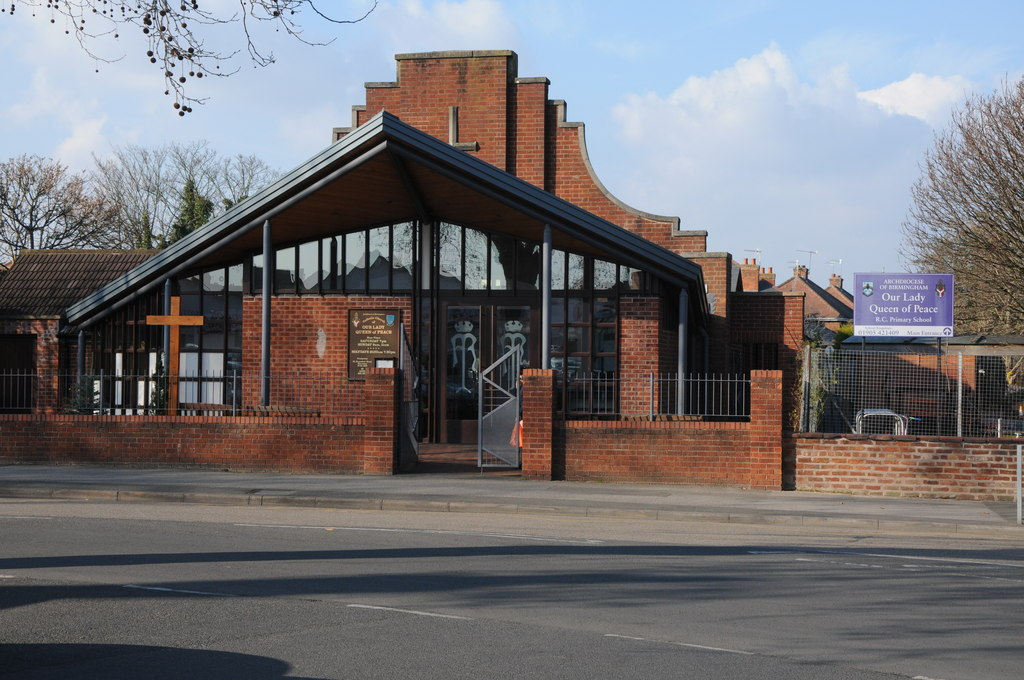
OLQP Parish Church located next to the primary school

St.John's is the home to a few of Worcestershire's 49 primary schools. The most central of these schools is Our Lady Queen of Peace RC Primary School which was founded in 1971 by the diocese. The uniform's primary colour is purple. There are other primary schools which are scattered around St.John's, though technically situated in Bedwardine and St Clement respectively; these schools are Pitmaston Primary School, Oldbury Park Primary School and St.Clements Primary School.

=== High schools ===
The only High School in St John's is Christopher Whitehead Language College which was founded in 1983 after a boys' school and a girls' school merged. It is co-educational and it caters for about 1100 students. The school's status as a language college was granted in 2005. The school has grounds close to the river used for sports but it also uses the state-of-the-art astro turf pitches on its site along with the facilities of the St John's sports centre, which is situated directly next to the school. There are two entrances to the school, one being on the Malvern Road and the other being on the A44.

=== The University ===
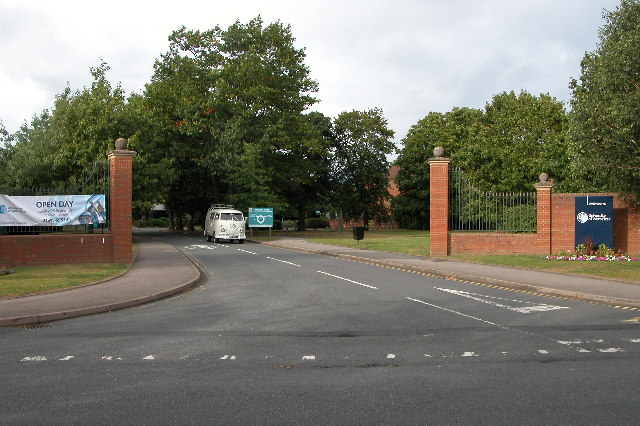
University Entrance on the Oldbury Road

The University of Worcester was granted University status in 2005. Its original campus, based on the west side of the River Severn, is named St John's Campus. This is likely due to its proximity to the St John's area. The University has many facilities including two full-size astro turf pitches for hockey and football. It has around 18,000 alumni which range from undergraduate students to post-graduate students. Its first-class science facilities, specifically the Darwin Building, are "cementing the University's status as one of the best learning environments in the UK." Perhaps the University's largest expansion came in 2010 when they opened their Business school in the centre of the city. The school is situated in a Georgian building, formerly the city hospital, where the British Medical Association was founded. Next door to this £100m investment is the Hive which is Europe's first University and Public library. It was opened by the Queen in 2012.

== Sport ==
=== Worcestershire County Cricket Club ===
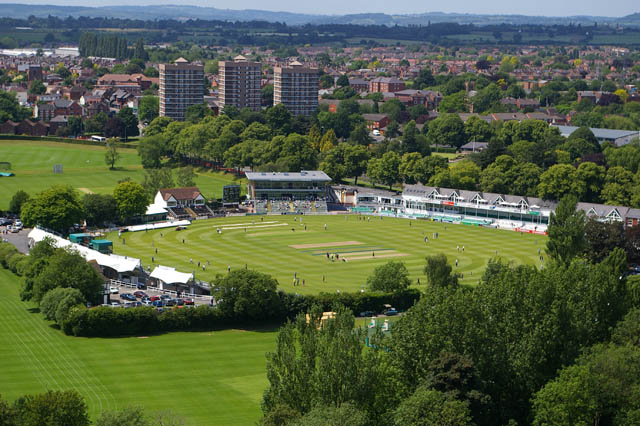
The New Road Stadia with the 3 towers of St John's in the distance

Worcestershire County Cricket Club has been a part of the St John's community since 1896 when they first played at New Road, the ground that they still use today. Although in recent years success on the pitch has been limited the club has a rich history and has been home to many great cricketers such as Graeme Hick, Basil D'Oliveira, Ian Botham, Moeen Ali and Glenn McGrath. The New Road ground is often flooded in winter by the nearby river and was severely affected by the floods of July 2007, leading to the cancellation of several matches, and losses that were estimated to take nine years to recoup.

Elton John played a concert at the ground in 2006.

=== Worcester Wolves ===
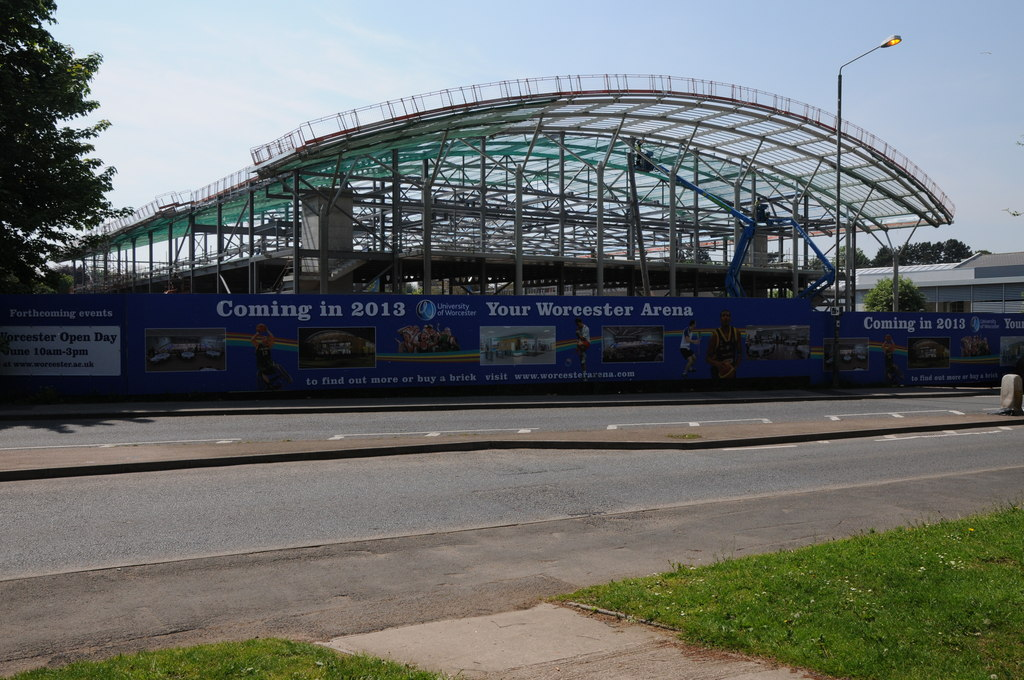
The Worcester Arena under construction in 2011

In May 2000 Roger Clarke and Mick Donovan announced the formation of the Worcester Wolves Basketball Team franchise to play at the University of Worcester's brand new £2.5 million 'state of the art' Sports Hall. 12 years later and the club is now part of the top division in British Basketball. The club's development has largely been down to the development of the University of Worcester but its fan base is spread across the city. Many of these fans are based in St John's due to the team's involvement with local schools from early on in the club's existence. Players from the first team would run after-school basketball sessions at schools such as Olbury Park Primary School and OLQP. This resulted in many students going to see their coaches playing at the University of Worcester where the Wolves are based. A new million-pound development by the riverside was constructed in 2012. It is called the Worcester Arena and it has a capacity of 1,500. As of the 2013/2014 season, it will be the location of the Worcester Wolves's home games.

Notable former players include Chuck Evans, James Life, Anthony Paez, Rick Solvason, Ty Shaw and Skouson Harker.

=== Worcester St Johns Cycling Club ===
In 1888 Worcester St Johns Cycling Club was founded. The club has always been a racing club and from early on it had success; Ernie Payne joined the club in 1903 and went on to win an Olympic Gold Medal at the London Games in 1908.

=== Oldbury Park Tigers ===
Oldbury Park Tigers FC is a community football club which operates many different youth teams across the city. Its creation came about in 2001 when a group of parents and students from Oldbury Park Primary School set up the team. Since its foundation, it has grown into an organisation with 11 teams and over 140 players.
