= Skouson Harker =

Canadian basketball player

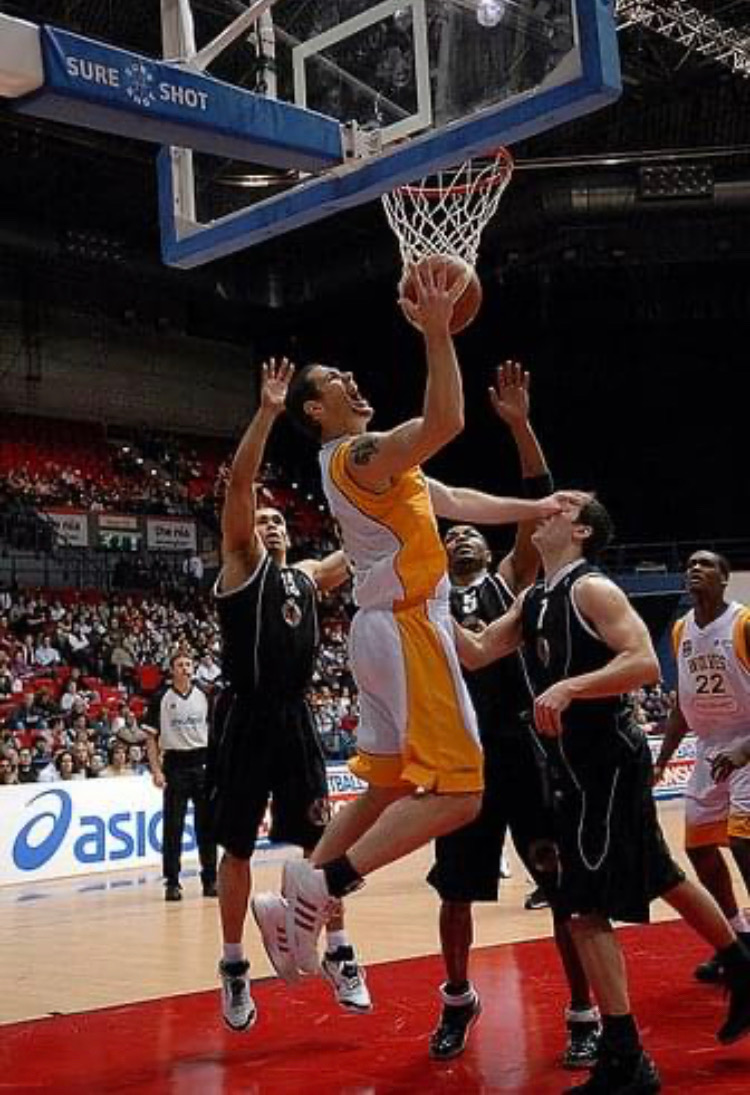
Skouson Harker competing in the British Basketball League

Skouson Hicken Harker (born February 16, 1977) is a Canadian former professional basketball player of the FIBA European Leagues. Harker is from Raymond, Alberta, Canada. After five seasons as a Head Coach in the British Basketball League, Harker most recently coached the Edmonton Energy of the International Basketball League.

== Raymond High School ==
Harker led the Raymond Comets to three straight Alberta Schools Athletic Association 4A (unlimited enrollment) Provincial Silver Medals (1993–1995), including a controversial 1995 4A final game versus Lester B. Pearson High School, in which one referee counted the winning basket, and the other waved it off. CTV Calgary and Sports @ 11 Highlights concluded the ball was on the backboard before the buzzer sounded. The correct call would have given the Comets their first provincial crown since Richard Bohne led the Comets to the 1989 title.

Raymond, population 3,674, has a long history in athletics and a reputation of winning versus Alberta's largest schools from Calgary and Edmonton. This reputation includes producing players like Harker.

== NCAA ==
Harker attended the University of Oregon. The Pac-10 featured 25 future NBA players in the 1999 season, including standouts Baron Davis, Matt Barnes, Jason Terry, Richard Jefferson, Mark Madsen, Brian Scalabrine, Eddie House, Todd MacCulloch and Oregon Ducks teammate and Harkers college roommate, Fred Jones. Harker played for Ducks head coach Ernie Kent, and assistant coaches Greg Graham (former Boise State University head coach) and Don Newman (present San Antonio Spurs assistant coach). The Ducks ended the 1999 regular season with a 40 RPI but were left out the NCAA Tournament due to finishing fifth behind four nationally ranked Pac-10 teams; Stanford, Arizona, UCLA, and Washington. As a result, the Ducks advanced to the National Invitational Tournament Final Four.

An injury sustained by Harker during a 92–63 win versus Brigham Young University six games into the season limited his productivity, and forced him from being sixth man and potential starter into a reserve role. Harker chose to play and help the team as he was not made aware by the coaching staff that an NCAA Medical Red Shirt would have saved his eligibility and season. Harker managed 15 points versus St. Martins and was named Player of the Game, and 10 points versus Washington State Cougars, six points and a team high eight rebounds versus University of Washington Huskies in what proved to be his best Pacific-10 conference weekend.

== Professional career ==
=== Birmingham Bullets ===
After playing two season's in US minor leagues NABL and IBA and one in Germany, Harker signed 2-year contract to play for the Birmingham Bullets of the British Basketball League. http://www.bbl.org.uk

During his second season with the Bullets Harker averaged just under 19 points and 7.9 rebounds, with his 668 points good for 6th in the league, and finished 9th in rebounding. He also added 3.1 assists per game, which ranked in the BBL's top 15.

During the 2005–2006 season while playing for the Bullets during a match with Newcastle Eagles, Harker and Eagles player/head coach Fabulous Flournoy became involved in an on-court fight in which Fabulous swung from behind punching Harker in the head, which resumed in the locker rooms post-game.

Both Harker and Flournoy were banned one (Harker) and five (Flournoy) games. Flournoy's ban was later reduced to three games. Police were informed about the incident and an investigation into Flournoy took place.

During the summers of 2005 and 2006 the Bullets became the first professional basketball club from Britain to tour China competing against Chinese Basketball Association clubs during the 'UK/China Basketball Friendship Tour'. Over the two summers Harker led the Bullets to 13 wins and 11 losses. Harker scored a professional career high of 44 points versus the Shandong Lions in 2006. Harker left Birmingham prior to the 2006 season after the franchise was forced into liquidation- after a two-year arena rental dispute with the City of Birmingham. After a strong season and summer the Canadian Senior Men's National Team invited Harker to their training camp.

=== Worcester Wolves ===
He returned to the British Basketball League as the player-coach of BBL franchise Worcester Wolves in July 2007.

After a four wins and 36 losses season in 2006/07 Harker led the club to 20 wins and 20 losses and the BBL Trophy Semi-Finals in his first season at the helm in 07/08. The 2008/09 season saw the Wolves beat three Eurobasket.com 'European Top 100 Clubs'(Newcastle Eagles, Everton Tigers, and Scottish Rocks). The 2008/09 season was the first season ever to see three BBL clubs in the Eurobasket Top 100, with Newcastle and Everton both in the top 75 at one stage. The Wolves fell out of the playoff race after losing former NCAA assists leader William Funn (Portland State) and the BBL assists leader at the time, for the season as the club was in a playoff position. Following a very successful two-year stint as the Wolves head coach-player, in which Harker averaged 16 points and 8 rebounds, he opted to return to the club as strictly a professional player for the 2009/10 season.

Harker's list of BBL recruits includes Jeff Bonds (Birmingham 2005/06) who went on to become BBL Co-MVP in 2006/07. Prior to the 2007 season Skouson recruited BBL All-Star, Slam Dunk Champ and BBL leading scorer Anthony Paez (Worcester 2007–08). Yorick Williams also led the BBL in scoring after being recruited to play for Harker (Birmingham 2005/06). Former All-Pac-10 performer Dino Tanner of Oregon State was recruited by Harker to the Bullets. Harker also brought in former Euroleague http://www.euroleague.com assists leader and former CSKA Moscow point guard Chuck Evans to the Wolves for the 2007–08 season.

As a player Harker left the BBL with over 4000 points in all competitions scoring over 16.7 per game. He also proved a reliable rebounder with a career average of 8.9 rebounds per contest. After an injury-riddled college career, Harker never missed a professional game due to injury.

=== Edmonton Energy ===
After being an All-Star the previous two IBL seasons, Harker was named the Head Coach of the Edmonton Energy in March 2011.

Harker was named International Basketball League All-Star for the second consecutive season in August 2010 after helping the Edmonton Energy and Coach Paul Sir to finishing Runner-up in the Continental Division. Harker signed for German team SC Rist Wedel in August 2010.

During spring 2009 the 6-foot-9-inch (206 cm) 240 lb Harker played for Coach Paul Sir and the Edmonton Energy of the International Basketball League. The Energy won the 2009 Regular Season Championship with a 17–3 record.

Harker was named a 2009 IBL All-Star with a well rounded 18.5 ppg and 8.3 rpg playing all 21 games. The forward scored 32 points versus the Vancouver Titans, as well as 34 points versus the Oregon Wave.

== Controversy ==
Harker continued with the Worcester-based club until 2010. A week prior to his departure, both Harker and Evaldas Zabas were named to the BBL Team of the Week. A week later Head Coach Chuck Evans' racist rant during a film session forced six Wolves players to refuse to play for the coach, as the club wanted to keep the 'incident quite' and not fire the coach. Coach Evans' resigned. Numerous teachers and fans wrote in to the Worcester News to show their support for their fired Wolves players, making it the Worcester News' most commented story within 2009. The community of Worcester schools, both pupils and teachers, as well as many concerned fans and citizens wrote to the newspaper and rallied around the six sacked players; all to no avail as the Wolves Owner Roger Clarke refused to let the players back on the team, even after the coach had resigned.

Harker's two-year stint as Head Coach at the Wolves has been said to have saved the Wolves from relegation back down to England's 2nd Division. Additionally Harker's tenor may have put the club in a position to hire current England National Team Head Coach Paul James, as well a move forward with the new Worcester Arena. Without the conviction and principle of which the sacked Wolves players demonstrated, the club would have never been in a position to hire Coach James.

== Career history ==
- 1995-96 (United States) Utah Valley Wolverines
- 1996-98 (United States) McCook College Indians
- 1998-99 (United States) University of Oregon Ducks
- 2001-02 (United States) Frontier City River Dogz
- 2002-03 (United States) Akron Wingfoots
- 2003-04 (Germany) TS Göppingen
- 2004-06 (United Kingdom) Birmingham Bullets Head Coach/player
- 2007-2010 (United Kingdom) Worcester Wolves Head Coach/player
- 2009 (Canada) Edmonton Energy
- 2009-10 (United Kingdom) Worcester Wolves
- 2010 (Canada) Edmonton Energy
- 2010-11 (Germany) SC Rist Wedel
- 2011 (Canada) Edmonton Energy Head Coach
