= Edmonton Energy =

- Founded: 2007
- Dissolved: 2012
- League: IBL (2008–12)
- Team history: Edmonton Chill (2007–08); Edmonton Energy (2009–12)
- Based in: Edmonton, Alberta, Canada
- Arena: Universiade Pavilion
- Colours: Blue, green, black, and white
- Owner: SMG Pro Hoops
- Head coach: Paul Sir
- Championships: 0

The Edmonton Energy were a professional basketball team in the International Basketball League. It was founded in 2007 as the Edmonton Chill until the name was revoked in August 2008, after allegations of misconduct were filed with the league regarding Troy Barns, the majority shareholder in the team.

On 27 January 2009, the Edmonton Chill were renamed Edmonton Energy. Eleven local business owners, led by businessman, chartered accountant, and mayoral candidate David Dorward came together to keep the IBL in Edmonton. Paul Sir was head coach and general manager of the Edmonton Energy.

The Edmonton Energy formerly played their home games at the MacEwan Centre for Sport and Wellness at MacEwan University, just north of Downtown Edmonton, but moved to the "Butterdome" (or Universiade Pavilion), located at the University of Alberta in the Windsor Park/Garneau area. The Energy was the second Canadian team in the International Basketball League, as Vancouver, British Columbia also had a team called the BC Titans.

The team folded in the summer of 2012 due to financial problems.

== 2009 season ==
The Edmonton Energy finished the regular season at the top of the IBL with a 17-3 record. The entire starting five of Will Funn (Portland State), J.R. Patrick (Santa Clara), Steve Sir (Northern Arizona), Skouson Harker (Oregon), and Lee Scruggs (Georgetown) were named 2009 IBL All-Stars. The team managed to split with the Los Angeles Lightning in LA, who eventually won the Playoffs. LA featured six former NBA players, including Bryon Russell and Lamond Murray.

=== Schedule ===
#	Date	Opponent	Score	OT	Record
1	May 2	@ Los Angeles	L 108 – 102	-	0 – 1
2	May 3	@ Los Angeles	W 128 – 115	-	1 – 1
3	May 8	BC	W 114 – 96	-	2 – 1
4	May 9	BC	W 144 – 119	-	3 – 1
5	May 15	Bellingham	W 144 – 134	-	4 – 1
6	May 16	Bellingham	L 141 – 121	-	4 – 2
7	May 22	Snohomish Co.	W 159 – 127	-	5 – 2
8	May 23	Snohomish Co.	W 148 – 120	-	6 – 2
9	May 29	Portland	W 131 – 99	-	7 – 2
10	May 30	Portland	W 129 – 100	-	8 – 2
11	June 5	Yamhill	W 145 – 99	-	9 – 2
12	June 6	Yamhill	W 162 – 94	-	10 – 2
13	June 8	Yamhill	W 142 – 86	-	11 – 2
14	June 9	Yamhill	W 159 – 101	-	12 – 2
15	June 13	Vancouver	W 109 – 104	-	13 – 2
16	June 14	Vancouver	W 120 – 107	-	14 – 2
17	June 20	Tacoma	W 101 – 85	-	15 – 2
18	June 21	Tacoma	W 133 – 101	-	16 – 2
19	June 28	@ Bellingham	L 121 – 115	-	16 – 3
20	June 29	@ BC	W 129 – 100	-	17 – 3

== 2010 season ==
Edmonton had another solid season in the IBL, with the team finishing 14-6. The Energy ended the regular season with a 2-1 series victory over the LA Lightning. Will Funn, Rashaun Broadus (BYU), Steve Sir, Dave Patten (Weber State), and Skouson Harker were named 2010 IBL All-Stars. Lee Scruggs was also named Honorable Mention for his veteran leadership and superb shooting as the team captain.

On 30 June 2010, it was announced by the team's ownership group that the team will not be participating in the 2010 playoffs in Portland, Oregon. After finishing second in the Continental Conference, the Energy qualified for the playoffs with a 14-6 record, however team ownership stated that they did not have enough money to fund the trip.

Coach Paul Sir finished his career with the Edmonton Energy with a 31–10 record over his two years as head coach.

=== Schedule ===
#	Date	Opponent	Score	OT	Record
1	May 14	Tacoma	W 120 – 94	-	1 – 0
2	May 15	Tacoma	W 124 – 100	-	2 – 0
3	May 16	Tacoma	W 128 – 121	-	3 – 0
4	May 21	BC	W 124 – 103	-	4 – 0
5	May 22	BC	L 126 – 118	-	4 – 1
6	May 23	BC	W 126 – 112	-	5 – 1
7	May 27	Bellingham	W 132 – 129	-	6 – 1
8	May 28	Bellingham	L 114 – 104	-	6 – 2
9	May 29	Bellingham	W 122 – 120	-	7 – 2
10	June 4	@ Albany	L 128 – 122	-	7 – 3
11	June 6	@ Albany	W 126 – 112	-	8 – 3
12	June 7	@ Albany	L 125 – 115	-	8 – 4
13	June 10	@ Battle Creek	W 129 – 122	-	9 – 4
14	June 11	@ Battle Creek	W 143 – 125	-	10 – 4
15	June 17	Yamhill	W 121 – 108	-	11 – 4
16	June 18	Yamhill	W 126 – 100	-	12 – 4
17	June 19	Yamhill	L 128 – 126	-	12 – 5
18	June 25	Los Angeles	W 144 – 103	-	13 – 5
19	June 26	Los Angeles	L 136 – 133	-	13 – 6
20	June 27	Los Angeles	W 146 – 131	-	14 – 6

== 2011 season ==
On February 11, 2011 the Club announced that it would be back for the 2011 season. Andrew Parker, Edmonton Energy guard, stated "We will play this year with a chip on our shoulder and show the fans that we deserve it." .

The team also announced that Rick Stanley will take over as the club's general manager for the 2011 season. The Energy's head coach is Skouson Harker.

The Edmonton Energy launched a dance team for the 2011 season, and coined them the "NRG Girls." The team is coached by former Grant MacEwan University dance coach and former Edmonton Crush coach Danielle Alasaad. It is composed of 13 dancers from Edmonton and surrounding areas. Girls on the team range from age 17 to age 25.

Team captain and All-Star Lee Scruggs stands 6’11" and is nicknamed ‘Captain Leezy’. The Energy team captain re-signed to the Edmonton IBL team. He began his career on the starting line for the Georgetown Hoyas. Scruggs was named an IBL All-Star in both the 2008 and 2009 Energy seasons, he spent two years in the NBA-D League as a professional rookie and has played for various FIBA leagues around the world. Scruggs said "I am super motivated to win it all this year; that has been my goal from day one in Edmonton. [W]e have a great team coming into training camp so our expectations are very high and I expect us to be a pretty good team this year- stay tuned for something special."

In April 2011, the Energy signed the Premier Basketball League's 2010-2011 official Player of the Year, Quinnel "Q" Brown. "Q" stands 6 feet 6 inches tall. He is a solid 37% 3 point shooter & an aggressive defenseman. Prior to the season's first game, "Q said that he was, "looking forward to a strong regular season with the goal being to win the championship and play with a good group of guys."

During their home opener, the Energy had a 129 - 107 victory over the Bellingham Slam on Friday, May 20. They lost the following two games in the series against the Bellingham Slam. The following weekend, the team played one home-game in Edmonton, and then travelled to Raymond, Alberta and Olds, Alberta where they won the entire series against the USA All-Stars. Friday: 131 - 123, Saturday: 140 - 91 and Sunday: 115 - 82.

=== Schedule ===
#	Date	Opponent	Score	OT	Record
1	May 13	@ Albany	L 109 – 106	-	0 – 1
2	May 14	@ Albany	L 120 – 113	-	0 – 2
3	May 15	@ Albany	W 124 – 108	-	1 – 2
4	May 20	Bellingham	W 129 – 107	-	2 – 2
5	May 21	Bellingham	L 128 – 95	-	2 – 3
6	May 22	Bellingham	L 111 – 99	-	2 – 4
7	May 27	USA All-Stars	W 131 – 123	-	3 – 4
8	May 28	USA All-Stars	W 140 – 92	-	4 – 4
9	May 29	USA All-Stars	W 115 – 82	-	5 – 4
10	June 2	Portland	W 133 – 102	-	6 – 4
11	June 3	Portland	W 158 – 126	-	7 – 4
12	June 4	Portland	W 139 – 129	-	8 – 4
13	June 10	West Coast	W 119 – 97	-	9 – 4
14	June 11	West Coast	W 115 – 107	-	10 – 4
15	June 12	West Coast	W 103 – 96	-	11 – 4
16	June 24	Albany	W 126 – 114	-	12 – 4
17	June 25	Albany	L 120 – 118	-	12 – 5
18	June 26	Albany	W 119 – 102	-	13 – 5
19	June 28	@ Olympia	W 103 – 97	-	14 – 5
20	June 29	@ Portland	L 125 – 106	-	14 – 6

== 2012 season ==
=== Schedule ===
#	Date	Opponent	Score	OT	Record
1	April 27	@ Orlando	W 112 – 97	-	1 – 0
2	April 28	@ Orlando	W 110 – 108	-	2 – 0
3	May 4	New Jersey	W 98 – 90	-	3 – 0
4	May 5	New Jersey	L 89 – 88	-	3 – 1
5	May 18	@ Bellingham	L 112 – 107	-	3 – 2
6	May 19	@ Salem	W 111 – 110	-	4 – 2
7	May 20	@ Portland	L 120 – 113	-	4 – 3
8	May 25	Salem	W 142 – 72	-	5 – 3
9	May 26	Salem	W 131 – 103	-	6 – 3
10	June 1	Olympia	W 126 – 69	-	7 – 3
11	June 2	Olympia	W 138 – 104	-	8 – 3
12	June 8	Yamhill	W 143 – 103	-	9 – 3
13	June 9	Yamhill	W 118 – 91	-	10 – 3
14	June 22	Vancouver	W 106 – 105	-	11 – 3
15	June 23	Vancouver	W 114 – 100	-	12 – 3
16	June 29	Nippon			
17	June 30	Nippon			
18	July 3	@ Olympia			

== Notable players ==
- (Canada) Jeff Ferguson
- (United States) Rashaun Broadus
- (Canada) Skouson Harker
