= 2011 FIBA Americas Championship squads =

These were the rosters of the 10 teams competing at the 2011 FIBA Americas Championship.

== Group A ==
=== Brazil ===
Brazil men's national basketball team roster
Players
Coaches

Pos.	No.	Name	Age – Date of birth	Height	Club	Ctr.
G/F	4	Marcelo Machado	36 – 12 April 1975	2.01 m (6 ft 7 in)	CR Flamengo	(Brazil)
PG	5	Nezinho dos Santos	30 – 21 January 1981	1.85 m (6 ft 1 in)	UniCEUB/BRB	(Brazil)
G	6	Rafael Luz	19 – 11 February 1992	1.85 m (6 ft 1 in)	CB Lucentum Alicante	(Spain)
PF	7	Augusto César Lima	19 – 17 September 1991	2.07 m (6 ft 9 in)	CB Málaga	(Spain)
SG	8	Vítor Benite	21 – 20 February 1990	1.90 m (6 ft 3 in)	Winner/Limeira	(Brazil)
PG	9	Marcelinho Huertas	28 – 25 May 1983	1.90 m (6 ft 3 in)	FC Barcelona Bàsquet	(Spain)
G/F	10	Alex Garcia	31 – 4 March 1980	1.89 m (6 ft 2 in)	UniCEUB/BRB	(Brazil)
F/C	11	Rafael Hettsheimeir	25 – 16 June 1986	2.09 m (6 ft 10 in)	CAI Zaragoza	(Spain)
F	12	Guilherme Giovannoni	31 – 2 June 1980	2.04 m (6 ft 8 in)	UniCEUB/BRB	(Brazil)
C	13	Caio Torres	24 – 3 June 1987	2.11 m (6 ft 11 in)	CR Flamengo	(Brazil)
F	14	Marcus Vinicius	27 – 31 May 1984	2.07 m (6 ft 9 in)	EC Pinheiros	(Brazil)
C	15	Tiago Splitter	26 – 1 January 1985	2.09 m (6 ft 10 in)	San Antonio Spurs	(United States)

Head coach

- (Argentina) Rubén Magnano

Legend

- nat field describes country
  of last club
  before the tournament
- Age field is age on August 30, 2011

=== Canada ===
Canada men's national basketball team roster
Players
Coaches

Pos.	No.	Name	Age – Date of birth	Height	Club	Ctr.
SG	4	Jermaine Anderson	28 – 8 February 1983	1.86 m (6 ft 1 in)	Panionios B.C.	(Greece)
PG	5	Cory Joseph	20 – 20 August 1991	1.93 m (6 ft 4 in)	San Antonio Spurs	(United States)
C	6	Jeff Ferguson	29 – 18 December 1981	2.11 m (6 ft 11 in)	Saint John Mill Rats	(Canada)
C	7	Kelly Olynyk	20 – 19 April 1991	2.13 m (7 ft 0 in)	Gonzaga University	(United States)
SG	8	Carl English	30 – 2 February 1981	1.95 m (6 ft 5 in)	CB Sevilla	(Spain)
SF	9	Denham Brown	26 – 6 January 1985	1.95 m (6 ft 5 in)	BC Dnipro	(Ukraine)
SG	10	Andy Rautins	24 – 2 November 1986	1.98 m (6 ft 6 in)	New York Knicks	(United States)
PF	11	Aaron Doornekamp	25 – 12 December 1985	2.01 m (6 ft 7 in)	Juvecaserta Basket	(Italy)
PF	12	Jesse Young	31 – 29 April 1980	2.08 m (6 ft 10 in)	Teramo Basket	(Italy)
SF	13	Jevohn Shepherd	25 – 8 April 1986	1.96 m (6 ft 5 in)	Skyliners Frankfurt	(Germany)
C	14	Levon Kendall	27 – 4 July 1984	2.10 m (6 ft 11 in)	Obradoiro CAB	(Spain)
C	15	Joel Anthony	29 – 9 August 1982	2.06 m (6 ft 9 in)	Miami Heat	(United States)

Head coach

- (Canada) Leo Rautins

Legend

- nat field describes country
  of last club
  before the tournament
- Age field is age on August 30, 2011

=== Cuba ===
Cuba men's national basketball team roster
Players
Coaches

Pos.	No.	Name	Age – Date of birth	Height	Club	Ctr.
PG	4	Alexis Mestre	25 – 19 August 1986	1.80 m (5 ft 11 in)	Sancti Spíritus BC	(Cuba)
SG	5	Juan Pablo Piñeiro	21 – 15 April 1990	1.93 m (6 ft 4 in)	Matanzas BC	(Cuba)
C	6	Abraham Richardson	22 – 13 August 1989	2.04 m (6 ft 8 in)	Capitalinos BC	(Cuba)
PG	7	Yaser Rodriguez	22 – 13 August 1989	1.86 m (6 ft 1 in)	Ciego de Ávila BC	(Cuba)
SF	8	Yorman Polas	26 – 8 August 1985	1.92 m (6 ft 4 in)	Camagüey BC	(Cuba)
SF	9	Lisvan Valdez	22 – 13 October 1988	1.94 m (6 ft 4 in)	Capitalinos BC	(Cuba)
C	10	Leonel Batista	25 – 29 March 1986	2.06 m (6 ft 9 in)	Camagüey BC	(Cuba)
SF	11	Yordanis Jaca	28 – 14 January 1983	1.96 m (6 ft 5 in)	Camagüey BC	(Cuba)
PF	12	Yoan Luis Haiti	29 – 20 April 1982	2.00 m (6 ft 7 in)	Ciego de Ávila BC	(Cuba)
SG	13	Yudniel Perez	27 – 7 March 1984	1.89 m (6 ft 2 in)	Ciego de Ávila BC	(Cuba)
PF	14	Orestes Torres	24 – 26 February 1987	2.02 m (6 ft 8 in)	Capitalinos BC	(Cuba)
PF	15	Enrique Ramos	21 – 14 September 1989	2.01 m (6 ft 7 in)	Ciego de Ávila BC	(Cuba)

Head coach

Legend

- nat field describes country
  of last club
  before the tournament
- Age field is age on August 30, 2011

=== Dominican Republic ===
Dominican Republic men's national basketball team roster
Players
Coaches

Pos.	No.	Name	Age – Date of birth	Height	Club	Ctr.
PG	4	Édgar Sosa	23 – 15 January 1988	1.85 m (6 ft 1 in)	Pallacanestro Biella	(Italy)
PF	5	Charlie Villanueva	27 – 24 August 1984	2.11 m (6 ft 11 in)	Detroit Pistons	(United States)
SG	6	Kelvin Peña	30 – 5 October 1980	1.93 m (6 ft 4 in)	Tiburones de Puerto Plata	(Dominican Republic)
PG	7	Luis Flores	30 – 11 April 1981	1.88 m (6 ft 2 in)	BC Krasnye Krylya Samara	(Russia)
SG	8	Manuel Fortuna	26 – 23 March 1985	1.86 m (6 ft 1 in)	Leones de Santo Domingo	(Dominican Republic)
SF	9	Francisco García	29 – 31 December 1981	2.01 m (6 ft 7 in)	Sacramento Kings	(United States)
C	10	Al Horford	25 – 3 June 1986	2.08 m (6 ft 10 in)	Atlanta Hawks	(United States)
C	11	Elys Guzmán	29 – 24 May 1982	2.06 m (6 ft 9 in)	Leones de Santo Domingo	(Dominican Republic)
SF	12	Orlando Sánchez	23 – 26 May 1988	1.98 m (6 ft 6 in)	Monroe College	(United States)
SF	13	Eulis Báez	29 – 18 March 1982	1.96 m (6 ft 5 in)	CB Valladolid	(Spain)
PG	14	Ronald Ramón	25 – 14 January 1986	1.82 m (6 ft 0 in)	Winner/Limeira	(Brazil)
PF	15	Jack Michael Martinez	29 – 12 October 1981	2.03 m (6 ft 8 in)	Cocolos de San Pedro de Macorís	(Dominican Republic)

Head coach

- (United States) John Calipari

Legend

- nat field describes country
  of last club
  before the tournament
- Age field is age on August 30, 2011

=== Venezuela ===
Venezuela men's national basketball team roster
Players
Coaches

Pos.	No.	Name	Age – Date of birth	Height	Club	Ctr.
PG	4	Heissler Guillen	24 – 17 December 1986	1.83 m (6 ft 0 in)	Bucaneros de La Guaira	(Venezuela)
PF	5	Nestor Colmenares	23 – 5 September 1987	2.03 m (6 ft 8 in)	Cocodrilos de Caracas	(Venezuela)
PG	6	Greivis Vásquez	24 – 16 January 1987	1.98 m (6 ft 6 in)	Memphis Grizzlies	(United States)
SG	7	Dwight Lewis	23 – 7 October 1987	1.98 m (6 ft 6 in)	Trotamundos de Carabobo	(Venezuela)
SG	8	David Cubillan	24 – 27 July 1987	1.82 m (6 ft 0 in)	Marquette University	(United States)
SG	9	Óscar Torres	34 – 18 December 1976	1.98 m (6 ft 6 in)	Marinos de Anzoátegui	(Venezuela)
SG	10	José Vargas	29 – 23 January 1982	1.96 m (6 ft 5 in)	Trotamundos de Carabobo	(Venezuela)
C	11	José Bravo	25 – 16 May 1986	2.02 m (6 ft 8 in)	Gigantes de Guayana	(Venezuela)
PF	12	Héctor Romero	31 – 3 January 1980	2.02 m (6 ft 8 in)	Indios de Mayagüez	(Puerto Rico)
SF	13	Axiers Sucre	33 – 27 July 1978	1.99 m (6 ft 6 in)	Marinos de Anzoátegui	(Venezuela)
C	14	Gregory Echenique	20 – 23 November 1990	2.02 m (6 ft 8 in)	Creighton University	(United States)
C	15	Windi Graterol	24 – 10 September 1986	2.04 m (6 ft 8 in)	Cocodrilos de Caracas	(Venezuela)

Head coach

- (United States) Eric Musselman

Legend

- nat field describes country
  of last club
  before the tournament
- Age field is age on August 30, 2011

== Group B ==
=== Argentina ===
Argentina men's national basketball team roster
Players
Coaches

Pos.	No.	Name	Age – Date of birth	Height	Club	Ctr.
PF	4	Luis Scola	31 – 30 April 1980	2.07 m (6 ft 9 in)	Houston Rockets	(United States)
SG	5	Emanuel Ginóbili	34 – 28 July 1977	1.98 m (6 ft 6 in)	San Antonio Spurs	(United States)
PG	6	Juan Ignacio Sánchez	34 – 8 May 1977	1.93 m (6 ft 4 in)	Weber Bahía Estudiantes	(Argentina)
C	7	Fabricio Oberto	36 – 21 March 1975	2.08 m (6 ft 10 in)	Unattached
PG	8	Pablo Prigioni	34 – 17 May 1977	1.86 m (6 ft 1 in)	Caja Laboral	(Spain)
C	9	Juan Pedro Gutiérrez	27 – 10 October 1983	2.05 m (6 ft 9 in)	Obras Sanitarias	(Argentina)
SF	10	Carlos Delfino	29 – 29 August 1982	1.98 m (6 ft 6 in)	Milwaukee Bucks	(United States)
SG	11	Paolo Quinteros	32 – 15 January 1979	1.88 m (6 ft 2 in)	CAI Zaragoza	(Spain)
C	12	Martín Leiva	31 – 23 April 1980	2.10 m (6 ft 11 in)	Peñarol	(Argentina)
SF	13	Andrés Nocioni	31 – 30 November 1979	2.01 m (6 ft 7 in)	Philadelphia 76ers	(United States)
SF	14	Hernán Jasen	33 – 4 February 1978	1.99 m (6 ft 6 in)	Cajasol Banca Cívica	(Spain)
PF	15	Federico Kammerichs	31 – 21 June 1980	2.05 m (6 ft 9 in)	CR Flamengo	(Brazil)

Head coach

- (Argentina) Julio Lamas

Assistant coach(es)

- (Argentina) Gonzalo García
- (Argentina) Néstor García

Legend

- nat field describes country
  of last club
  before the tournament
- Age field is age on August 30, 2011

=== Panama ===
Panama men's national basketball team roster
Players
Coaches

Pos.	No.	Name	Age – Date of birth	Height	Club	Ctr.
F	4	Reyjavick DeGracia	29 – 5 November 1981	2.03 m (6 ft 8 in)	Navieros de Colón	(Panama)
PG	5	Jamar Warren	32 – 18 February 1979	1.83 m (6 ft 0 in)	Toros de Aragua	(Venezuela)
SG	6	J. R. Pinnock	27 – 11 December 1983	1.98 m (6 ft 6 in)	Capitanes de Arecibo	(Puerto Rico)
SG	7	Ariel Robinson	22 – 14 February 1989	1.89 m (6 ft 2 in)	Unattached
F/C	8	Eduardo Archibold	24 – 19 May 1987	2.06 m (6 ft 9 in)	LeMoyne College	(United States)
SG	9	Gary Forbes	26 – 25 February 1985	2.01 m (6 ft 7 in)	Denver Nuggets	(United States)
F/C	10	Josimar Ayarza	24 – 3 May 1987	2.00 m (6 ft 7 in)	Unattached
C	11	Joel Tesis	29 – 19 March 1982	2.04 m (6 ft 8 in)	Escuela Superior Politecnica del Litoral	(Ecuador)
PF	12	Gyno Pomare	25 – 5 April 1986	2.04 m (6 ft 8 in)	Sendai 89ers	(Japan)
SF	13	Desmond Smith	24 – 24 November 1986	1.99 m (6 ft 6 in)	Magnates	(Panama)
C	14	Jaime Lloreda	30 – 10 November 1980	2.06 m (6 ft 9 in)	Atléticos de San Germán	(Puerto Rico)
C	15	Rubén Garcés	37 – 17 October 1973	2.08 m (6 ft 10 in)	Club La Unión	(Argentina)

Head coach

- (Panama) David Rosario

Legend

- nat field describes country
  of last club
  before the tournament
- Age field is age on August 30, 2011

=== Paraguay ===
Paraguay men's national basketball team roster
Players
Coaches

Pos.	No.	Name	Age – Date of birth	Height	Club	Ctr.
SG	4	Derlis Torres	31 – 6 July 1980	1.76 m (5 ft 9 in)	Club Olimpia	(Paraguay)
SF	5	Daniel Pérez	27 – 13 August 1984	1.89 m (6 ft 2 in)	Club Libertad	(Paraguay)
PG	6	Enrique Martinez	33 – 31 May 1978	1.89 m (6 ft 2 in)	Regatas Corrientes	(Argentina)
SF	7	Bruno Zanotti	28 – 13 September 1982	1.98 m (6 ft 6 in)	Club Atlético Lanús	(Argentina)
SG	8	Ramón Sánchez	19 – 1 October 1991	1.90 m (6 ft 3 in)	1ero de Mayo	(Paraguay)
PG	9	Victor Ozuna	29 – 19 April 1982	1.82 m (6 ft 0 in)	Club Sol de América	(Paraguay)
PG	10	Federico Mellone	26 – 20 January 1985	1.86 m (6 ft 1 in)	Deportivo San José	(Paraguay)
C	11	Guillermo Araujo	28 – 20 September 1982	2.02 m (6 ft 8 in)	Club Libertad	(Paraguay)
SF	12	José Manuel Fabio	33 – 31 December 1977	2.00 m (6 ft 7 in)	Club Sol de América	(Paraguay)
C	13	Cristian Rodas	22 – 7 August 1989	2.06 m (6 ft 9 in)	Félix Pérez Cardozo	(Paraguay)
SF	14	Alejandro Barreto	20 – 17 April 1991	1.92 m (6 ft 4 in)	Club Sol de América	(Paraguay)
PF	15	Adolfo López	22 – 7 May 1989	1.99 m (6 ft 6 in)	Félix Pérez Cardozo	(Paraguay)

Head coach

Legend

- nat field describes country
  of last club
  before the tournament
- Age field is age on August 30, 2011

=== Puerto Rico ===
Puerto Rico men's national basketball team roster
Players
Coaches

Pos.	No.	Name	Age – Date of birth	Height	Club	Ctr.
SG	4	Javier Mojica	26 – 31 August 1984	1.86 m (6 ft 1 in)	Weber Bahía Estudiantes	(Argentina)
PG	5	José Juan Barea	27 – 26 June 1984	1.80 m (5 ft 11 in)	Dallas Mavericks	(United States)
SF	6	John Holland	23 – 11 June 1988	1.96 m (6 ft 5 in)	Chorale Roanne Basket	(France)
PG	7	Carlos Arroyo	32 – 30 July 1979	1.88 m (6 ft 2 in)	Boston Celtics	(United States)
SG	8	Bimbo Carmona	28 – 14 June 1983	1.96 m (6 ft 5 in)	Indios de Mayagüez	(Puerto Rico)
PF	9	Angel Alamo	26 – 9 June 1985	2.06 m (6 ft 9 in)	Piratas de Quebradillas	(Puerto Rico)
PG	10	Andrés Rodríguez	30 – 27 February 1981	1.84 m (6 ft 0 in)	Obradoiro CAB	(Spain)
PF	11	Ricky Sánchez	24 – 6 July 1987	2.11 m (6 ft 11 in)	Weber Bahía Estudiantes	(Argentina)
C	12	Manuel Narvaez	30 – 12 May 1981	2.11 m (6 ft 11 in)	Maratonistas de Coamo	(Puerto Rico)
PF	13	Renaldo Balkman	27 – 14 July 1984	2.03 m (6 ft 8 in)	New York Knicks	(United States)
SF	14	Alexander Galindo	26 – 6 May 1985	2.00 m (6 ft 7 in)	Ciclista Olímpico	(Argentina)
C	15	Daniel Santiago	35 – 24 June 1976	2.16 m (7 ft 1 in)	Spirou Charleroi	(Belgium)

Head coach

- (Puerto Rico) Flor Meléndez

Legend

- nat field describes country
  of last club
  before the tournament
- Age field is age on August 30, 2011

=== Uruguay ===
Uruguay men's national basketball team roster
Players
Coaches

Pos.	No.	Name	Age – Date of birth	Height	Club	Ctr.
PG	4	Fernando Martínez	31 – 9 December 1979	1.76 m (5 ft 9 in)	Club Malvín	(Uruguay)
PG	5	Gustavo Barrera	28 – 3 February 1983	1.94 m (6 ft 4 in)	Club Unión Atlética	(Uruguay)
SF	6	Mauricio Aguiar	23 – 11 June 1988	1.99 m (6 ft 6 in)	Gruppo Triboldi Basket	(Italy)
C	7	Mathías Calfani	19 – 21 January 1992	2.05 m (6 ft 9 in)	Biguá	(Uruguay)
PG	8	Bruno Fitipaldo	20 – 2 August 1991	1.84 m (6 ft 0 in)	Club Malvín	(Uruguay)
PF	9	Sebastián Izaguirre	25 – 4 December 1985	2.07 m (6 ft 9 in)	Defensor Sporting	(Uruguay)
SG	10	Leandro Garcia Morales	31 – 27 June 1980	1.88 m (6 ft 2 in)	Cocodrilos de Caracas	(Venezuela)
PG	11	Martín Osimani	30 – 22 May 1981	1.94 m (6 ft 4 in)	Obras Sanitarias	(Argentina)
C	12	Reque Newsome	29 – 8 October 1981	2.04 m (6 ft 8 in)	Club Malvín	(Uruguay)
PF	13	Sebastián Vázquez	25 – 4 September 1985	2.03 m (6 ft 8 in)	Club Malvín	(Uruguay)
PF	14	Nicolás Borsellino	25 – 8 May 1986	2.02 m (6 ft 8 in)	Club Malvín	(Uruguay)
C	15	Esteban Batista	27 – 2 September 1983	2.08 m (6 ft 10 in)	Anadolu Efes S.K.	(Turkey)

Head coach

- (Uruguay) Gerardo Jauri

Legend

- nat field describes country
  of last club
  before the tournament
- Age field is age on August 30, 2011
