= Masiulis =

Masiulis is the masculine form of a Lithuanian family name. Its feminine forms are: Masiulienė (married woman or widow) and Masiulytė (unmarried woman). Notable people with the surname include:

- Algimantas Masiulis (1931–2008), Lithuanian actor
- Artūras Masiulis (born 1980), Lithuanian basketball player
- Eligijus Masiulis (born 1974), Lithuanian politician
- Gytis Masiulis (born 1998), Lithuanian basketball player
- Juozas Masiulis, Lithuanian knygnešys
- Laurynas Masiulis, baptismal name of Laurynas Gucevičius, 18th-century Lithuanian architect
- Tomas Masiulis (born 1975), Lithuanian basketball player
