= Olympia Reign =

Semi-professional basketball team that played in the IBL in 2014

- Founded: 2008
- League: International Basketball Association (IBL)
- Team history: Olympia Reign (2008-2014)
- Based in: Tumwater, Washington
- Arena: Skookum Creek Event Center
- Owner: Mark Felton
- Head coach: Steve Smothers
- Championships: 0

The Olympia Reign was a semi-professional basketball team competing in the International Basketball League (IBL). The club ceased operations after playing two of a scheduled six-game schedule in 2014.

== History ==
Based in Tumwater, Washington, they were founded in 2008 and played home games in the Nisqually Tribe Youth Recreation Center. They were sponsored by the Little Creek Casino Resort, the Kamilche Trading Post, Farmers Insurance Group, Oympia Physical Therapy, Northwest Sports Medicine Center, and the Brick on Trosper.

After three full seasons in the IBL the Reign and Little Creek Casino Resort parted ways. The club played just two games in 2013 and again in 2014 as a "branding team" in the league, not eligible for IBL playoffs.

== Season-by-season ==
Season	W	L	Result	Playoffs
2009	0	7	5th of 5 International Conf.	DNP
2010	17	6	2nd of 8 International Conf.	Lost quarterfinal to Yamhill High Flyers
2011	6	15	7th of 8 International Conf.	Lost quarterfinal to Albany Legends
2012	8	14	4th of 4 International Conf.	Lost semifinal to Portland Chinooks
2013	2	0	N/A	DNP
2014	0	2	N/A	DNP
TOTALS	33	44		
