= Nate Bowie =

American basketball player (born 1986)

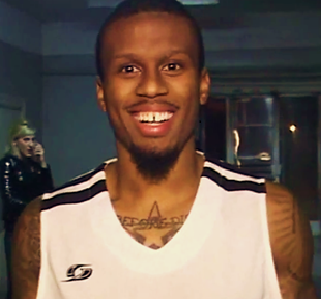

Personal information
- Born: June 11, 1986 (age 40) Kansas City, Kansas
- Listed height: 6 ft 0 in (1.83 m)
- Listed weight: 165 lb (75 kg)

Career information
- High school: Washington (Kansas City, Kansas)
- College: Colby CC (2004–2006); Central Arkansas (2006–2008)
- NBA draft: 2008: undrafted
- Playing career: 2009–2015
- Position: Point guard

Career history

Playing
- 2009: Vancouver Titans
- 2009–2010: Otero Xuven Cambados
- 2010: Yamhill Highflyers
- 2010–2012: Terceira Basket
- 2012: Al Ahli Doha
- 2012–2013: Rustavi
- 2013–2014: Kryvbas
- 2014: Maliye Milli Piyango
- 2014: Aries Trikala
- 2015: Sigal Prishtina

Coaching
- 2015–2016: Allen Community College (assistant)
- 2016–2019: Mt. Hood CC (assistant)
- 2019–2022: Mt. Hood CC

Career highlights
- Proliga winner (2011); IBL All-Star (2010); Georgian Superliga All-Star (2013)

Nathan Ezell Bowie (born June 11, 1986) is an American basketball coach and former player.

His first experience as a basketball player was at Washington High School in Kansas City, Kansas. He played for Colby Community College in Kansas from 2004 to 2006. At the end of his sophomore season, he realized he had two years left in college career to prolong his basketball career. He decided to transfer to the University of Central Arkansas. He played for the Central Arkansas Bears basketball from 2006 to 2008.

Bowie declared for the 2008 NBA Development League Draft, but was undrafted. From March 2008 to 2014 he played on eleven different professional basketball teams.

== Early life and high school ==
The son of Ernest and Barbara Bowie, Nate Bowie grew up in Kansas City, Kansas. Basketball developed as an early passion from a young age. He was influenced by watching vintage basketball games and the early influences of his brother and father. Bowie used to compete a lot against his older brother, who was his role model. These early family influences helped him develop his competitive spirit and his basketball skills.

Bowie attended Washington High School in Kansas, where he averaged 25 points, 6 rebounds and 4 assists per game. His team finished third in the state, in the 5A Tournament. Bowie was First Team All State, All Region and All Conference in his senior year. He holds the single game scoring record for the school, with 38 points in a game against Olathe South High School, breaking Earl Watson's school record.

== Collegiate career ==
=== Colby Community College (2004–2006) ===
Bowie started his college career in 2004 playing for Colby Community College, a first division National Junior College Athletic Association team. For his freshman year, he averaged 10.9 points per game. For his sophomore year, he doubled his scoring stats, averaging 20.8 points per game. In 2006, he won NJCAA awards and distinctions. He was All-Tournament First Team, All Conference First Team, All Region Team and All American. He was also the NJCAA Co-Player of the Year in 2006.

=== University of Central Arkansas (2006–2008) ===
At the end of his sophomore season at Colby, Bowie transferred to the University of Central Arkansas, a National Collegiate Athletic Association team in order to have a chance to become a professional player. As a junior, Bowie averaged 10.8 points per game. The next season (2007–2008), he averaged 17.5 points per game. He also averaged 20.3 points per game in the Southland Conference, winning the scoring title. On February 2, 2008, he scored 39 points in a win against Nicholls State University. He became All-Southland Conference 2nd Team, All-Southland American Team, and also NCAA All-American Nominee. At the end of his college career, Rand Chappell described Bowie's career as "solid, and sometimes spectacular".

== Professional career ==
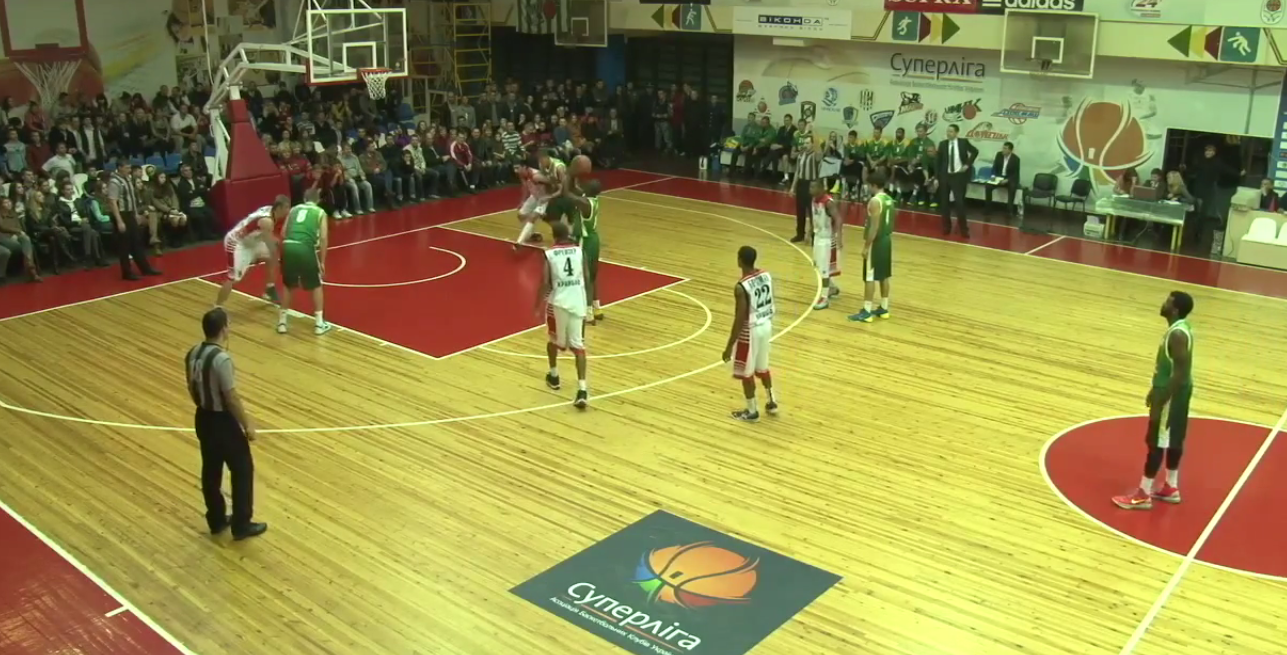
Nate Bowie at the free throw line.

=== Vancouver BC Titans (2008–2009) ===
At the end of his senior year in college, Bowie signed for NBA D-League Draft. However, he was not drafted. In March 2009, he joined the Vancouver Titans, a team in the International Basketball League. He played 10 games and he averaged 23.1 points per game. During the season, he left his team in order to train in Morocco.

=== Establencimientos Otero Xuven Cambados (2009–2010) ===
Before the beginning of the season, he signed with Zasavje PRO-TEK of the Slovenian Premier A League, but only appeared in pre-season games. He moved to Spain in October 2009, to play for Establencimientos Otero Xuven Cambados, in the fourth-tier Liga EBA. He played 27 games, scoring 14.5 points per game. In March 2010, he signed at Yamhill High Flyers, in the International Basketball League. He played 25 games, and averaged 23.8 points per game. He became an IBL All Star, and had the IBL Honorable Mention. His team went to the semifinals of the championship.

=== Terceira Basket (2010–2012) ===
Bowie signed with Terceira Basket of the Portuguese second-tier Proliga at the beginning of the 2010–2011 season. He played 32 games and averaged 25.6 points per game, 6.7 rebounds per game, and 5.3 assists per game. Terceira Basket won the Proliga Championship in 2011 and was promoted to the top-tier Liga Portuguesa de Basquetebol. The following season, Bowie played 15 games for Terceira, averaging 19.1 points per game. He left Terceira Basket in March 2012, and joined Al Ahli Sports Club Doha, in the Qatar-D1, where he played 3 games.

=== Energy Invest Rustavi (2012–2013) ===
At the beginning of the season 2012–2013, Bowie joined Georgian Superliga club Energy Invest Rustavi, where he played 23 games, and averaged 21.9 points per game. He played the entire season with Energy, and played in the All-Star Game. Rustavi finished the season in second place, losing in the finals.

=== SC Kryvbas Kryvyi Rih (2013–2014) ===
Bowie started the 2013–2014 season in the Ukraine-Superleague, playing for SC Kryvbas Kryvyi Rih. He played 19 games, averaging 10.8 points per game, before moving to Maliye Milli Piyango, in the Turkish third-tier TB2L in March 2014. He played 4 games with the team, averaging 11.0 points per game.

=== Trikalla (2014–2015) ===
He joined Trikala Basketball Club for the 2014–15 season in the Greek Basket League. In 10 games, he averaged 10.2 points and 6.0 assists per game.

== Coaching career ==
In 2015, Bowie became an assistant coach at Allen Community College. The following season, he was hired as an assistant coach at Mt. Hood Community College. He later became the head coach of the men's team.

== Personal life ==
In March 2022 he was arrested on two counts of using a child in a display of sexually graphic content and one count of first-degree online sexual corruption of a minor.

== Statistics ==
Legend
GP	Games played	GS	Games started	MPG	Minutes per game
FG%	Field goal percentage	3P%	3-point field goal percentage	FT%	Free throw percentage
RPG	Rebounds per game	APG	Assists per game	SPG	Steals per game
BPG	Blocks per game	PPG	Points per game	**Bold**	Career high

College:

Year	Team	GP	GS	MPG	FG%	3P%	FT%	RPG	APG	SPG	BPG	TO	PPG
2004–05	Colby Community College				42,3	35,3	73,5	2,2	3,1	1,8	0		10,9
2005–06	Colby Community College	27			45,2	39,5	65,8	3,6	3,9	1,9	0		20,8
2006–07	Central Arkansas	30	13	25,4	36,9	28,8	77,6	2,47	3,03	1,17	0,07	3,00	10,83
2007–08	Central Arkansas	30	30	35,2	40,0	33,5	77,3	3,47	3,47	1,93	0,03	3,13	17,5

Professional:

Year	Team	GP	GS	MPG	FG%	3P%	FT%	RPG	APG	SPG	BPG	PPG
2008–09	Vancouver BC Titans	10						5	3,2	4	0	23,1
2009–10	Otero Xuven Cambados	27			52	32	74	3,4	3,1	1,6	0	14,5
2009–10	Yamhill Highflyers	25						4,7	5,3		0	23,8
2010–11	Terceira Basket	16	16	38,7	36,5	26,4	78,1	3,51	3,88	1,62	0	19,00
2011–12	Forum Terceira Basket	16	16	38,7	36,5	26,4	78,1	3,51	3,88	1,62	0	19,00
2011–12	Al Ahli Sports Club Doha	3	3		56,4	39,8	75,6	6,6	7			17,1
2012–13	Rustavi	22	21	30,2	49,9	38,3	60,6	5,86	4,77	2,82	0	22,00
2013–14	Maliye Milli Piyango	4	4	29,3	27,1	7,7	65,4	2,25	2,25	4,75	0	11,00
2013–14	Kryvbasbasket-Lux Kryvyi Rih	18	8	25,1	43,8	32,1	52,2	2,67	4,67	1,17	0	10,89

== Awards and accomplishments ==
=== Club honours ===
- Proliga winner (2011)

=== Individual awards ===
- NJCAA All-Tournament First Team (2006)
- NJCAA First Team All Conf (2006)
- NJCAA All-Region Team (2006)
- Co-Player of the Year (2006)
- All-Southland Conf. 2nd Team (2008)
- All-Southland American Team (2008)
- NCAA All-American Nominee (2008)
- IBL All-Star (2010)
- Georgian Superliga All-Star (2013)
