= Paul James (basketball) =

British basketball player and coach (born 1964)

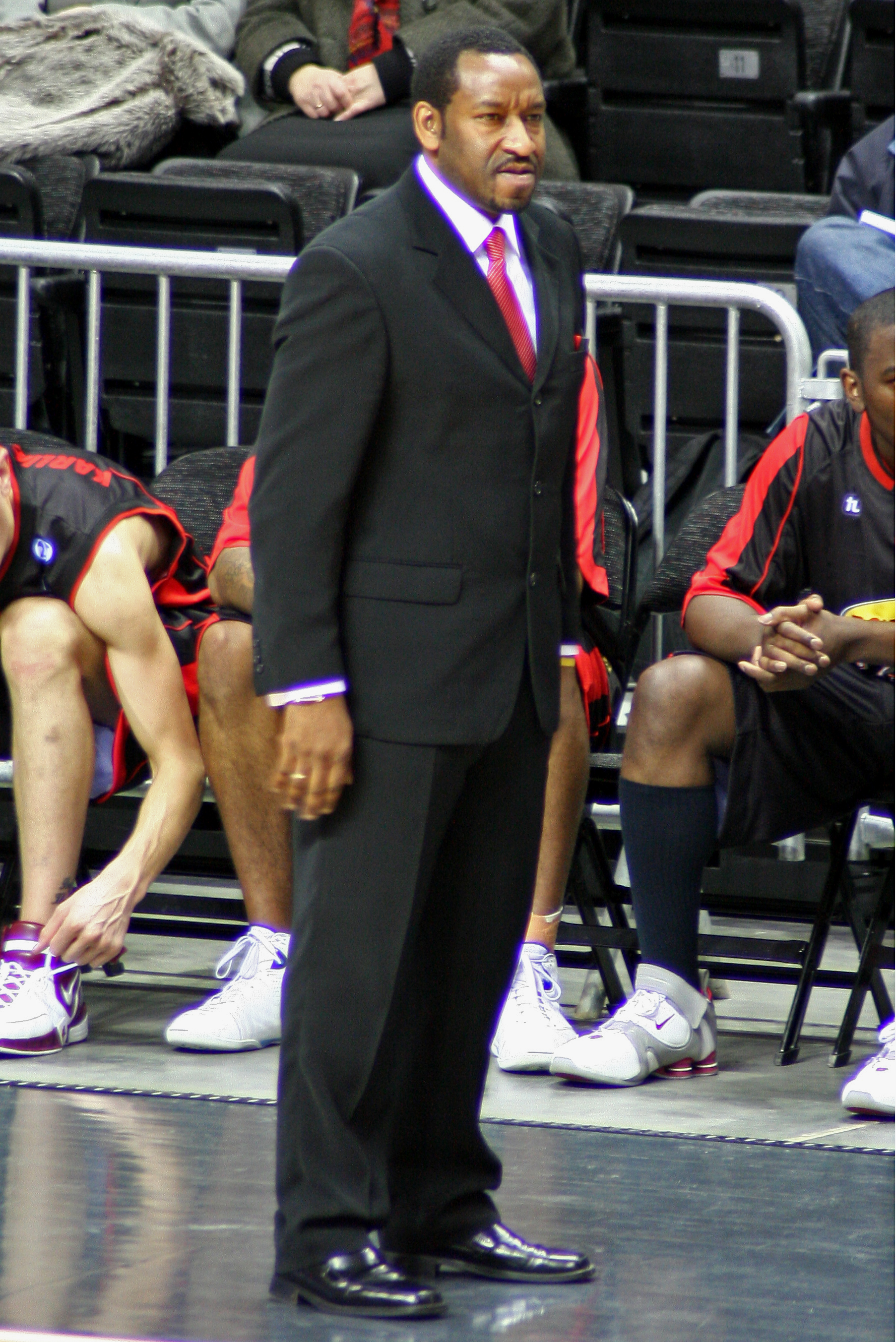
- James in 2007

Plymouth City Patriots
- Title: Head coach
- League: BBL

Personal information
- Born: 11 September 1964 (age 62) Leicester, England
- Listed height: 1.75 m (5 ft 9 in)

Career information
- Playing career: 1981–1996
- Position: Point guard
- Coaching career: 1996–present

Career history

Playing
- 1981–1988: Leicester All-Stars
- 1988–1996: Bracknell / Thames Valley Tigers

Coaching
- 1996–2005: Thames Valley Tigers
- 2005–2009: Guildford Heat
- 2009–2018: Worcester Wolves
- 2010–2016: England
- 2018–2021: Plymouth Raiders
- 2021–present: Plymouth City Patriots

Paul Julian James (born 11 September 1964) is a former professional basketball player and current head coach of the British Basketball League (BBL) team Plymouth City Patriots.

Born in Leicester, England, James' career in basketball started out as a player for his hometown team Leicester All-Stars. He made his league debut on 26 September 1981, just weeks after his 17th birthday, against local rivals Nottingham. He enjoyed seven successful years at the All-Stars (now known as Riders) before moving south to sign for Bracknell Tigers in 1988.

After nine years as a player, James was then promoted head coach of the Tigers in 1997, a position he retained until 2005 when the franchise was pulled from the league. However, he was soon offered the coaching position of Guildford Heat, a club established by fans of the former Tigers to take their place in the BBL. In just two seasons, James led the new franchise to fifth place in their rookie season and a League and Cup double in 2007, an achievement for the club, for which he was awarded BBL Coach of the Year 2007. The proceeding season saw James lead the Heat into its first European adventure, competing in the ULEB Cup, however a disappointing campaign finished 0-10 in a Group that contained the likes of DKV Joventut, Alba Berlin and BC Šiauliai.

The 2008-2009 season was one of financial struggle for Guildford, and as a cost-cutting measure confirmed that James's contract would not be renewed at the end of the season. Thus leading to the appointment of Chad McKnight, a former player under James at the Heat, as the new player/coach of the Guildford team.

On 7 December 2009 it was announced that James was appointed as the new head coach of Worcester Wolves following the resignation of Chuck Evans.

On 29 January 2010 it was announced that James was appointed as head coach of the England men's team.

On 10 August 2021, it was announced that James was appointed as inaugural head coach of the Plymouth City Patriots a new franchise for the 2021–22 BBL season.
