= Markus Hallgrimson =

German basketball player (born 1975)

Markus Hallgrimson (born May 31, 1975 in Germany) is a German-American professional basketball player, most notable for his NCAA D2 record for 16-three-point field goals in a single game. Hallgrimson was born on May 31, 1975, in Lörrach, Germany, where his American father, Paul, was working as an exchange teacher. Later that decade in 1979, the family moved to Langen, where his father took on the role of coach for the men's basketball team at TV 1862 Langen, leading the team to promotion to the Basketball Bundesliga in 1981.

Hallgrimson grew up in Langen and learned to play basketball at TV 1862 Langen. In 1992, he left Germany for the United States to complete his high school education. At the same time, he played for the Mercer Island High School basketball team in Washington State, where one of his teammates was David Arigbabu, where they won the Washington State AAA title in 1993. After graduating from high school, Hallgrimson returned to Germany at the end of 1994 and rejoined his old team in Langen. During the 1996/97 season, he spent time at Hiwassee College before playing for USC Heidelberg in Germany’s second-tier Basketball Bundesliga.

In 1997, Hallgrimson returned to the U.S. to accept a full basketball scholarship at Montana State University Billings. In his final year with the university team, during the 1999/2000 season, he attracted attention by setting a record for hitting 16 three-pointers in a single game. Over the season, he maintained a 40% success rate from beyond the arc and averaged 24 points per game. As a result, Hallgrimson, also known by the nickname "Montana," was named to the NCAA Division II All-American team. He also set an NCAA record with an average of 6.2 three-pointers per game.

In 2000, Hallgrimson returned to Germany to join MTV Gießen in the Basketball Bundesliga. However, after just one year, he moved to Hamburg in the second-tier league, where his team won the 2nd Basketball Bundesliga North championship. Following the financial collapse of the Hamburg team, he transferred to NVV Lions Mönchengladbach but, after averaging 24.9 points per game, moved on to BV Chemnitz 99 after just seven games. At Chemnitz, Hallgrimson became a key player, averaging 17.5 points per game and setting a personal second-tier record with 44 points, including ten three-pointers, in a game against the Iserlohn Kangaroos in November 2002.

After another season in the first-tier league with TSK Würzburg, where he mostly came off the bench, Hallgrimson had a brief stint with Los Barrios in Spain before joining the Genève Devils in Switzerland, where he played for one season. In November 2005, he returned to his former team, TV 1862 Langen, and stayed until the end of the season. After a short period with ASC Theresianum Mainz, Hallgrimson returned to the Basketball Bundesliga for the third time, this time with Mitteldeutscher BC, but stayed for only one season. He then moved to England to play for the Worcester Wolves before returning to Würzburg in 2007, this time in the Regionalliga Südost with the Würzburg Baskets. During the 2008/09 season, he became a key player and fan favorite, helping the team secure promotion to Pro B. After the season, he asked the club to release him from his contract, which ran until 2010, for personal reasons.

After a brief stint with Ithri Rif Nador in Morocco, Hallgrimson joined Pro B team SC Rasta Vechta in December 2009. Over the course of the season, he averaged 12.3 points per game. A few weeks into the 2010/11 season, he moved to another Pro B team, Wiha Panthers Schwenningen, where he became the highest-scoring German player in the league. He averaged 20.1 points per game, ranking third in the Pro B South division and ninth overall in the Pro B. He also set season records during a game against Konstanz.

In the 2013/14 season, Hallgrimson joined the RheinStars Köln. For the 2014/15 season, he initially played for league rival Erftbaskets Euskirchen before transferring to BSG Grevenbroich, another Regionalliga team, where he finished the season.

In veteran-level basketball, he played for TG Würzburg and won championships with the team. Hallgrimson eventually took over the management of the student exchange business founded by his late father, which facilitates exchanges between Europe and the United States.

== Career history ==
- 2000–2001 (Germany) Avitos Giessen
- 2001–2002 (Germany) BCJ Hamburg Tigers
- 2002 (Germany) NVV Lions Mönchengladbach
- 2002–2003 (Germany) Chemnitz 99
- 2003–2004 (Germany) TSK Würzburg
- 2004 (Spain) Los Bairros
- 2004–2006 (Switzerland) Geneve Devils
- 2006 (Germany) ASC Theresianum Mainz
- 2006–2007 (Germany) Mitteldeutscher BC
- 2007 (United Kingdom) Worcester Wolves
- 2007–2008 (Germany) Würzburg Baskets
- 2009-2010 (Germany) SC Rasta Vechta
- 2010–2011 Wiha Panthers Schwenningen
- 2011–2013 Giants Düsseldorf
- 2013–2014 RheinStars Köln
- 2014–2015 Grevenbroich Elephants
