= Chuck Evans (basketball) =

American basketball player and coach (born 1971)

Charles Lee Evans (born December 12, 1971) is a retired American professional basketball player, and former coach of British team Worcester Wolves.

Evans was born in Atlanta, Georgia. A 1.80 m tall point guard, he led the 1994–95 Euroleague in assists with 6.2 per game. At the time he was playing for Russian club CSKA Moscow. Later he played in Germany with the Bayer Giants Leverkusen and Alba Berlin. In 2007, he signed for British Basketball League side Worcester Wolves, joining the club at the same time as fellow Americans James Life and Anthony Paez. As starting point guard that year, he recorded two triple doubles, in back-to-back home games, and was widely thought of as the best creative point guard in the BBL and received an honourable mention for Player of the Month in March 2008. At the end of the season, he moved to rival BBL side Everton Tigers, for whom he played for one season before returning to coach Worcester Wolves. He is also writing a regular column for the local newspaper, the Worcester Evening News.
