= Terry Emmert =

American businessman and entrepreneur

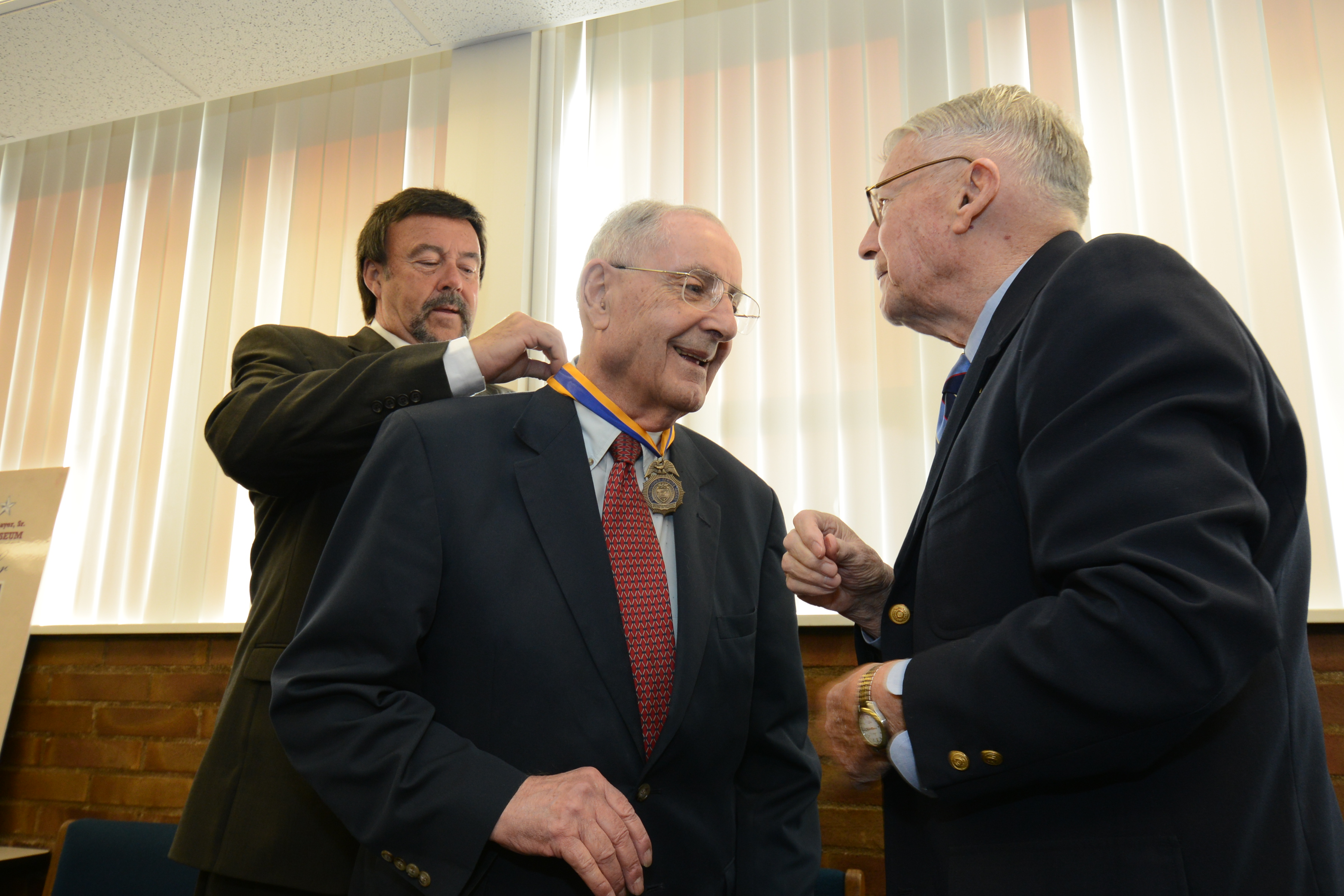
- Emmert (left) with former Oregon Governor Vic Atiyeh (center)
- Born: Terry W. Emmert
- Education: Central Catholic High School
- Occupations: Businessman; entrepreneur; sports franchise owner

Terry W. Emmert is an American businessman, entrepreneur and former sports franchise owner from Clackamas, Oregon, a suburb of Portland. He is the founder and owner of Emmert International, an engineering and transport service company, and the former owner of International Basketball League's Portland Chinooks and the Portland Thunder professional Arena Football League team. He has two children, Terry Michael Emmert, who is vice president of Emmert International, and Christine Vessey, the vice president of Multrec Corporation.

== Background ==
He is a 1962 graduate of Central Catholic High School.

== Business ventures ==
=== Emmert International ===
Emmert's company, Emmert International, is an asset-based engineered transport, rigging, and structural relocation service company based out of Clackamas, Oregon. The company specializes in the most massive and heavy-hauling and rigging projects in the world moving everything from houses to airplane engines.

=== Sports ownership ===
An avid sports fan, Emmert began dabbling in the world of professional sports. In 2002, he and his close friend former Portland Trail Blazers legend Clyde Drexler worked on finalizing a deal to purchase the original Portland Fire of the WNBA after that franchise had three bad seasons under the ownership of then Blazers owner Paul Allen. Unfortunately, Drexler, Emmert and the WNBA could not come to a deal to finalize the sale of the franchise and it eventually folded.

==== Portland Chinooks ====
Emmert was the principal owner of the Portland Chinooks of the International Basketball League. He bought the team due in part to his problems with the ABA's Portland Reign, yet did not escape problems with the Chinooks in his attempt to bring minor league hoops to Portland. His choice to have home games played at Portland's Eastmoreland Racquet Club created a furor among members, and forced the Chinooks to find a new venue for the team's second season (this decision was also influenced by the need for a larger venue).

==== Portland Thunder ====
In 2013, Emmert finalized a deal with the Arena Football League to purchase the franchise rights to the Milwaukee Mustangs team and relocate them to Portland. The deal was finalized and the team became the Portland Thunder and began play at the Moda Center on March 17, 2014 against the San Jose SaberCats (televised on CBS Sports Network). Emmert's franchise is the second AFL team to play in Portland after the now-defunct Portland Forest Dragons. His team made the playoffs twice with 5–13 records, yet fired its coaches in each of the first two seasons.

On January 6, 2016, the AFL announced that it had taken over operations of the Thunder from Emmert. He told the Portland Tribune newspaper that the future of the team was up in the air because he was concerned with the league's medical insurance policies and was hoping to try to attract more investors to help fund the team. This prompted league officials and the board of directors to take control of the franchise and look for new owners. However, Emmert had trademarked all logos, the colors and the "Thunder" name, similar to what Dallas Cowboys owner Jerry Jones had done with the Dallas Desperados. Thus the AFL had no alternative but to create a new franchise with a new identity. His former franchise would soon be rebranded the Portland Steel under the league's ownership. The Steel folded in October 2016.

This may open the door for Emmert to take his identity to another league, likely the Indoor Football League much like former AFL/af2 teams in the past such as the Green Bay Blizzard, Tri-Cities Fever, Iowa Barnstormers and Spokane Shock. (The Shock would later become the Spokane Empire due to trademark issues with the AFL's Shock identity.) This was only if the previous Portland AFL franchise folded after the 2016 season or beyond, which never happened.

The current Arena Football One franchise, the Oregon Lightning, were rumored to have paid partial tribute to Emmert's former Thunder team by rebranding their team previously known as the Oregon High Desert Storm to the "Lightning".

== Real estate ==
Emmert has owned a 33,800 square feet (3,140 m^{2}) plot of land in Portland's Cully neighborhood since 1985. He tore down the occupied buildings in 2008 and began construction on an apartment building. The construction was abandoned, leaving a partially-constructed apartment building, described by Willamette Week as looking like "the movie set of a ghost town in a post-apocalyptic film".
