= Emmert International =

- Founded: 1964
- Founder: Terry Emmert
- Headquarters: Clackamas, Oregon
- Services: specialized heavy transportation and rigging

Emmert International is a specialized heavy transportation and rigging company based in Clackamas, Oregon. Founded by Terry Emmert as a house and small building relocation company, the majority of the company’s revenue is generated from its commercial division. Emmert International has three branches; Rhome, Texas, Danbury, Texas and the corporate branch in Clackamas, Oregon.

Emmert International’s commercial division specializes in mega-load relocation via road, marine and rail, as well as rigging and gantry crane lifts. Most commercial work falls under the category of "engineered transport," wherein each load is carried on a custom transporter.

Some of Emmert International's notable projects include the Spruce Goose airplane designed by Howard Hughes, the Hubble Space Telescope, the 3.2 million-pound brick Fairmount Hotel, the Los Angeles County Museum of Art installation "Levitated Mass," and Fermilab's g-2 muon particle accelerator. Emmert International’s primary focus is on the power, oil gas and chemical, nuclear, mining, and aerospace industries.

Emmert International is a division of Emmert Industrial Corporation.

== History ==
During the rapid urban expansion of the 1960s, Terry Emmert began purchasing homes from properties set for commercial development and relocating them to undeveloped properties he had acquired. As Emmert began hiring out his crew for other structure relocation projects, in 1964 he established Emmert International as a house and small building relocation company.

To expand the business further, Emmert International designed and manufactured a new dolly and jacking system. The project, led by Mike Albrecht, led the company to further growth.

In the 1990s, Emmert International launched its commercial division, with the vision of pursuing larger clients. The company grew considerably, with company revenue increasing by 2000%. During this growth period, Emmert International opened two new branches in Rohme and Danbury, Texas, and Clackamas became its corporate headquarters.

In June 2009, a 411-ton electrical transformer made in China was delivered to a utility in New Hampshire over the Conway Scenic Railroad using a Schnabel car from Emmert International.

In 2020, Emmert International set a record in Nevada by hauling a 2.5 million pound decommissioned nuclear reactor to Salt Lake City.
