= Universiade Pavilion =

Multi-purpose indoor arena in Alberta, Canada

Coordinates: 53°31′24″N 113°31′41″W

- The Butterdome
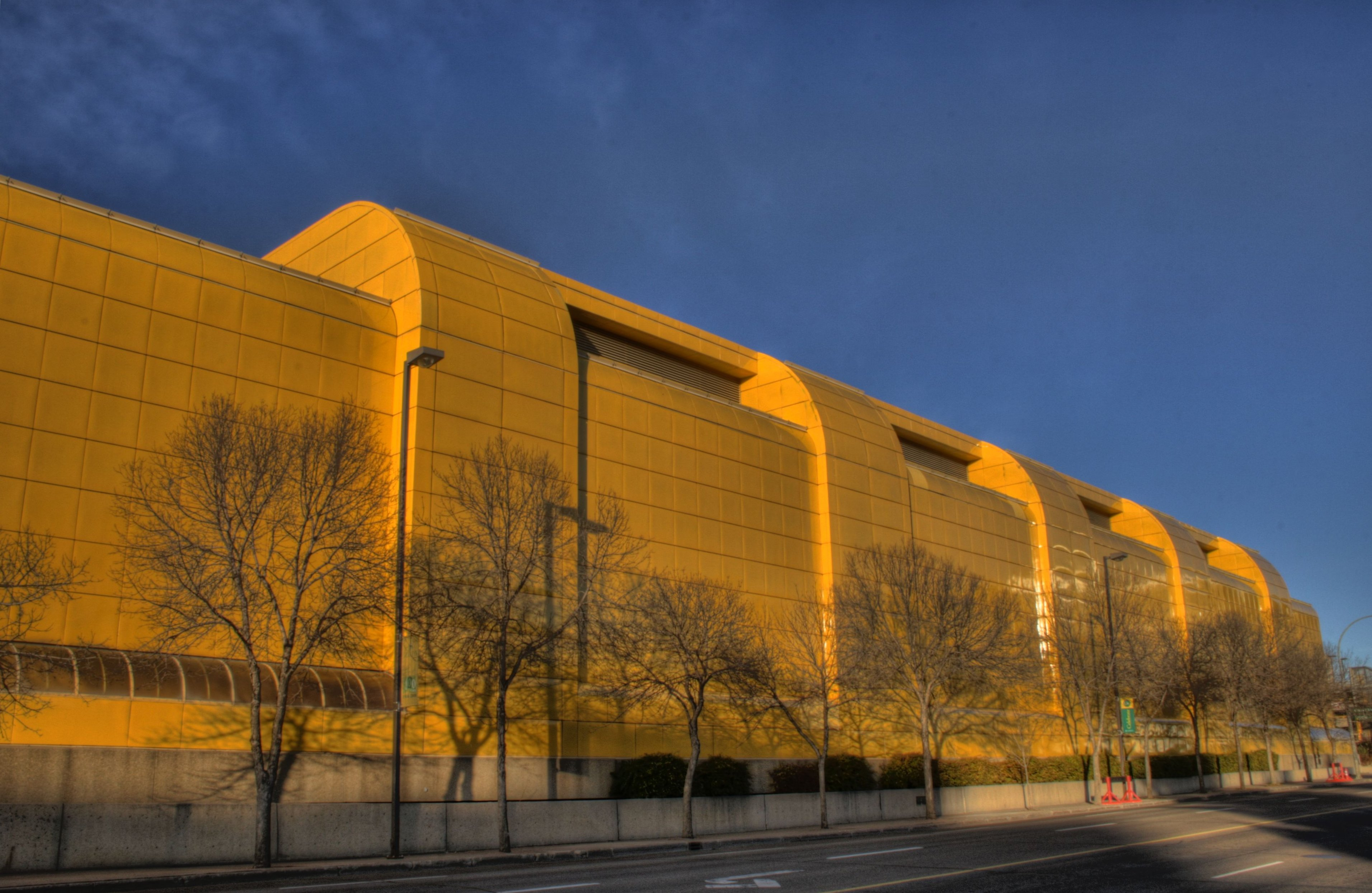
- Interactive map of Universiade Pavilion
- Location: Main Campus
- Owner: University of Alberta
- Capacity: 5,500

Construction
- Opened: 1983

Tenants
- Alberta Golden Bears/Alberta Pandas (U Sports); Edmonton Energy (IBL) (2009–2011)

The Universiade Pavilion, better known as the Butterdome, is a 5,500-seat multi-purpose arena in Edmonton, Alberta, Canada, on the campus of the University of Alberta. It was built for the 1983 Summer Universiade.

While the official name of the facility is the Universiade Pavilion, because of its rectangular shape and bright yellow exterior, locals quickly began referring to it as the Butterdome. Today, even the University of Alberta often uses this nickname to refer to this structure.

The upper sections of the regular seating are permanently mounted, while the lower sections are collapsible to increase the space available on the floor. During the University Games, the capacity was increased to 11,000 using temporary bleachers.

Facilities at the Pavilion include:

- 6-lane rubberized 200 m indoor track (10-lane 60 m sprint straightaway)
- 4 basketball/volleyball/tennis courts
- 4 badminton courts
- Long jump and pole vault
- Wrestling room

In 2025, the University of Alberta began a $27 million renovation of the Pavilion. The renovation will change the building's exterior to a yellow and green design, remove rounded portions of the roof that caused snow and ice to collapse onto the adjacent sidewalk, and replace deteriorating components of the building's envelope. Work on the renovation is expected to finish in fall 2027.

== Uses and events ==
In addition to university athletics and indoor sports, the Universiade Pavilion has hosted consumer and community events, including the Butterdome Craft Sale. The craft sale has holiday and spring editions at the Butterdome and features Canadian artists, artisans, makers and designers from across Canada. The holiday edition has been described by CityNews Edmonton as Alberta's largest craft sale.
