= James Noel (basketball) =

James Noel (born 18 October 1982) is a British professional basketball player and professor of English literature. He played for the Wolverhampton Wolves and Plymouth Raiders in the British Basketball League (BBL).

Born in Catford, London, to a Jamaican mother, Noel was educated at the Masters College in California. The 6'7 power forward returned to England in 2006 to sign with rookie professional outfit Worcester Wolves in the BBL. Despite the Wolves' dismal season, where they ended with a 4–32 record and a last-place finish, Noel shone through as a revelation recruit. Averaging 26.48 minutes per game, Noel posted 8.57 points and 7.96 rebounds in his first season out of college.

Noel finished seventh in the Floor Shooting percentages table, with a tally of 54.19%, which raised awareness amongst rival coaches in the league. Plymouth Raiders head coach Gary Stronach was the quickest to react and immediately signed him during the 2007 close-season. Although initially signed as a back-up forward to Raiders' 2007 MVP Gaylon Moore, Noel displayed his tough play and strong hustle whenever he got the chance and soon forced his way up the pecking-order on Raiders' deep bench.

Noel is a published author. He was a contributing author to the 2003 anthology, Open My Eyes, Open My Soul: Celebrating Our Common Humanity, co-created by Elodia Tate and Yolanda King, daughter of Dr. Martin Luther King Jr. and Coretta Scott King. He is also the author and creator of the Boris Basketball And Friends, a series of children's books.

Noel is a professor English literature at Los Medanos College in California.
