= Jeff Ferguson (basketball) =

Canadian professional basketball player

Personal information
- Born: December 18, 1981 (age 44) Toronto, Ontario
- Listed height: 6 ft 11 in (2.11 m)
- Listed weight: 245 lb (111 kg)

Career information
- High school: Benton Harbor (Benton Harbor, Michigan)
- College: Missouri (2001–2005); Wayne State (2005–2006); Pikeville (2007–2008)
- NBA draft: 2008: undrafted
- Playing career: 2008–present
- Position: Power forward

Career history
- Quebec Kebs
- Edmonton Energy

Jeffrey Ferguson (born December 18, 1981) is a Canadian professional basketball player, currently playing for Edmonton Energy of the International Basketball League.

== High school ==
Ferguson attended Northern Collegiate Institute & Vocational School in Sarnia, Ontario after moving from Toronto just to attend the Southwestern Ontario school to play basketball. After a successful junior year averaging 12.2 points, 10.1 rebounds and 2.8 blocks per game Ferguson was forced to miss out on his senior year due to confusing Sarnia rules concerning transfer students. Even missing his last year of High School basketball he was offered scholarships to Michigan, Michigan State, North Carolina and Kentucky however Ferguson selected Missouri.

== College Basketball ==
Ferguson played NCAA Division I college basketball at the University of Missouri. He played two years and was redshirted in his last year.

== Professional Basketball ==
Ferguson played for the Quebec Kebs in the Premier Basketball League. He then joined the Edmonton Energy of the IBL having his best year in the 2010/11 season averaging 10.5 points and 4.89 rebounds per game.

== Canada Basketball ==
Ferguson has represented Canada Basketball at various levels of competition. He was selected to the 2011 FIBA Americas Championship in Argentina making it his first senior tournament team.
