= Artūras Masiulis =

Lithuanian basketball player (born 1980)

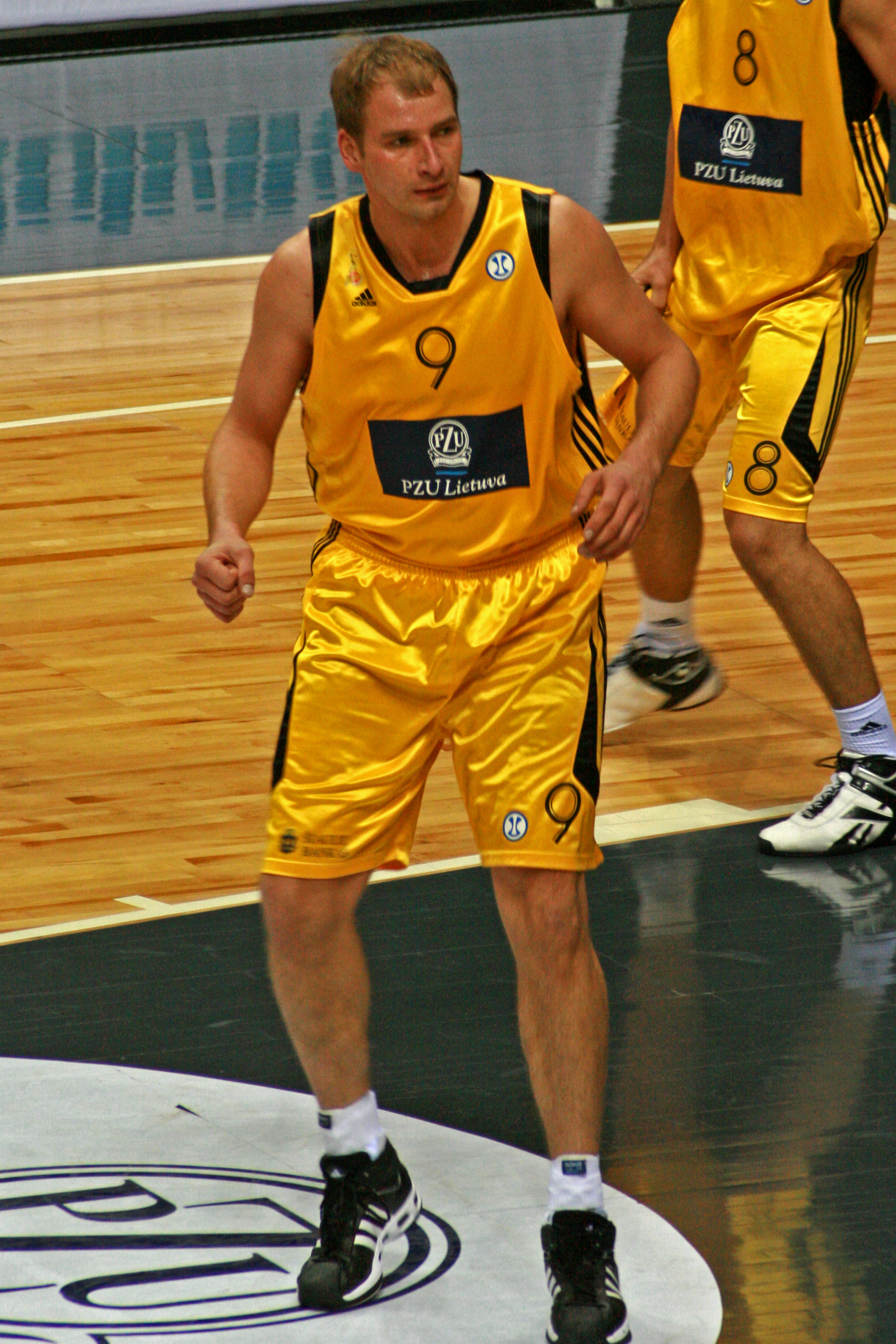

Personal information
- Born: 2 May 1980 (age 46) Anykščiai, Lithuanian SSR, Soviet Union
- Listed height: 6 ft 11 in (2.11 m)
- Listed weight: 275 lb (125 kg)

Career information
- Playing career: 1997–2013
- Position: Center

Career history
- 1997–2000: Jonavos SK Triobet Malsta
- 2000–2003: Žalgiris
- 2003: Tartu Rock
- 2003–2004: Szolnoki Olaj
- 2004: Tartu Rock
- 2004: Sakalai
- 2004-2005: Lokomotiv Rostov
- 2005–2008: Šiauliai
- 2009: Kaunas Triobet
- 2009–2010: Târgu Mureş
- 2010–2011: CSU Sibiu
- 2011: Pieno žvaigždės
- 2011: BC Sūduva
- 2011–2012: BC Kėdainiai Triobet
- 2012–2013: Worcester Wolves

Artūras Masiulis is a retired professional Lithuanian basketball player whose position was center. His best years were in the 2001–2003 seasons as a center for Žalgiris and the 2005–2008 seasons with Šiauliai, during which time he became one of the best centers in the LKL.

== Achievements ==
- 2001 year: LKL Champion
- 2003 year: Estonian basketball league Bronze medal
- 2006 year: Baltic Basketball League Bronze medal
- 2006, 2007, 2008 years: Lithuanian Basketball League Bronze medals
- 2008 year: LKF Cup Bronze medal
