= USA All-Stars =

- Founded: 2008
- League: IBL (2008-2014)
- Team history: USA All-Stars (2008-2014)
- Based in: United States
- Arena: N/A
- Colors: black, red, yellow
- Owner: League Owned
- Head coach: Mikal Duilio
- Championships: N/A

The USA All-Stars is a developmental basketball team in the International Basketball League. The All-Stars are owned and operated by the league. The team will be made up of players which participated in camps, each being signed for six weeks. They will play an all road schedule which will be held in six game sets throughout the season.
