= Enrique Ramos =

Enrique Ramos may refer to:

- Enrique Ramos González ("Quique Ramos", born 1956), Spanish footballer
- Enrique Ramos Ramos (1873–1957), Spanish Republican politician, served in the cabinet of José Giral
- Enrique Ramos Rodríguez (1932–2017), Mexican politician from Veracruz
- Enrique Ramos (writer) (1738–1801), Spanish army officer, translator and playwright, member of the Spanish Royal Academy
