= Worcester Wolves =

British professional basketball team

- League: NBL Division 1
- Established: 2000; 26 years ago
- History: Worcester Wolves; 2000–present
- Arena: Worcester Arena
- Capacity: 2,000
- Location: Worcester, Worcestershire
- Team colours: Navy blue, white, orange
- Ownership: University of Worcester
- Championships: 0 BBL Championship; 1 BBL Playoffs; 1 BBL Cup; 1 BBL Trophy
- Website: worcesterwolves.org

The Worcester Wolves are a basketball club in Worcester, England. The team plays in the NBL Division 2, the third tier of British basketball. The club was formed in 2000, and from 2006 until 2021 competed in the British Basketball League, the top tier of British basketball. Since 2013, the Wolves have played their home games at the 2,000-capacity Worcester Arena.

== History ==
Worcester Wolves logo, used from 2000 until 2013

=== New arena, new franchise ===
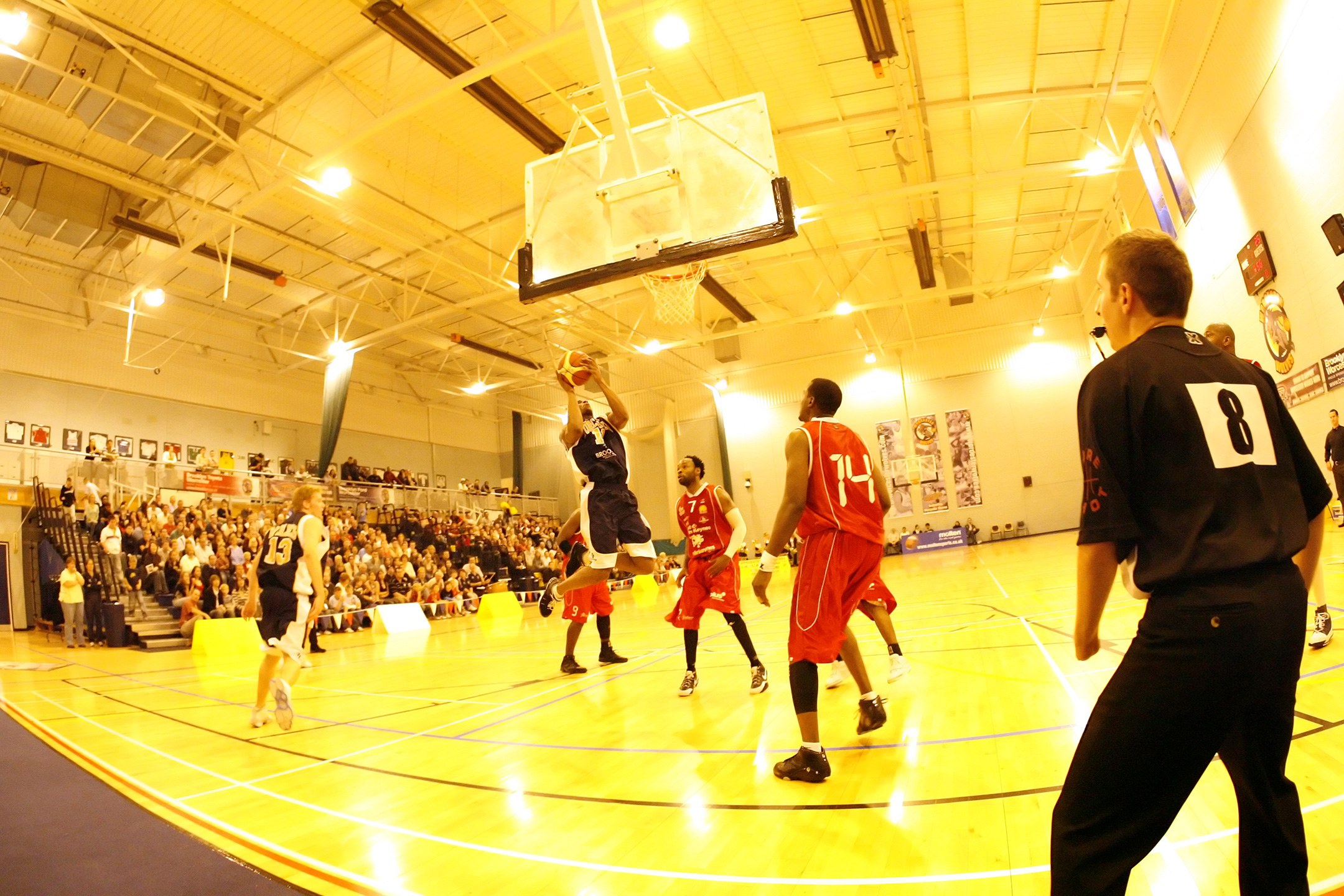
St. John's Sports Centre at the University of Worcester, home of Worcester Wolves until 2013.

The historic city of Worcester has, until recent years, not had much of a basketball history. Worcester City Chiefs were an active lower league club during the mid-1990s before moving to Solihull in 1996, leaving the city without a major basketball club. This changed in May 2000 when Roger Clarke and Mick Donovan announced the formation of the Wolves franchise, centred around player coach Rick Solvason, to play at the University of Worcester's new sports hall.

=== Starting low, aiming high ===
In their first season of action (2000–01) in National Basketball League Division 3 the Wolves finished second in the 12 team league with an 18–3 record. Local rivals Bristol Bombers pipped them to the title, however luck would soon swing their way the following season.

Initially placed in the regionalised NBL Division 2 in the "clean sheet reorganisation" of 2001, the Wolves played only the first game of the season in that division before being elevated (ahead of Bristol) into NBL Division 1 when Doncaster withdrew at the start of the season.

University College Worcester Basketball Scholarships became available in September 2002 for talented players to study and play at the same time, and the club attracted a wealth of new talent including Ty Shaw (Idaho), Keith Jarrett and Rikki Prince (Both from Birmingham Bullets) that became the foundations of a strong first team.

=== Rapid rise ===
The facilities and organisation which earned the team a promotion gave an advantage, and over the years they became established in what has now been renamed EBL Division 2, and won promotion to EBL Division 1 following a campaign from 2003 to 2004. Despite finishing in second place behind London Capital, they managed to beat them in the Playoff final at the National Indoor Arena, winning 95–87. The victory finished a season that saw the Wolves also win the Patron's Cup, following a 111–100 win against Hackney White Heat in the final that was played at the University of Worcester, their home location.

Worcester had a relatively successful debut season (2004–05) in EBL Division 1, finishing above fellow promotion winners London in 4th place with 13–9 record, which earned them a place in the post season playoffs. They built on their successes for the second season and finished 2005–06 in 4th place with a 17–9 record in the expanded Division 1. That season also saw the Wolves claim their biggest success to date, winning the National Trophy at the SkyDome Arena in Coventry, beating holders Sheffield Arrows 97–82 in the final.

=== Mixing with the elite ===
At the end of the 2005–06 season, the British Basketball League, the country's elite league was, not for the first time, suffering a membership crisis with three franchises, Birmingham Bullets, Brighton Bears and London Towers withdrawing from the league set-up. Although the Wolves management have claimed it was always their intention to move into the BBL, the possibility of it happening so quickly seemed near impossible. However, with the lack of a West Midlands-based franchise in the league, the BBL approached the Wolves and elected them into the league, along with London United.

2006–07 season
With an influx of new players, including former Plymouth Raider Solomon Sheard, Caja Rioja's Sergio Rodriguez and James Noel of the Masters College all players signed up for the new-look team, and expectations of challenging the stronger sides were high, but the promising start did not materialize. The Wolves opened the season with a 77–82 home loss to Plymouth on 30 September 2006, followed by a 21-point away defeat to Milton Keynes Lions (74–96). It was a case of third time lucky as, on 7 October, in front of a packed crowd at the "Wolves' Lair", Worcester edged past the Chester Jets with an 82–79 victory and Andy Harper posting 28 points for the home side.

However the Wolves struggled and soon fell behind the pack, spending most of the season at the foot of the table. The highlight of the season for the Midlands club came on 20 January 2007, when second-place Sheffield Sharks were the visitors to the Wolves' Lair. The home side caused, without doubt, the biggest shock of the season by defeating the title-challengers 70–65, a result that would ultimately hand the Championship to Guildford. Despite this moral boosting win, Worcester continued to flounder and ended the season in tenth and last place with just four league wins to their name, eventually forcing head coach Josh Cooprider to resign after a 4–36 Campaign (4–41 overall).

2007–08 season
On 15 July, Wolves announced that former Birmingham Bullets head coach Skouson Harker would lead the team into the 2007–08 season. Worcester had a record of 14–19, and 20–20 overall qualifying for the playoffs. They lost to Newcastle Eagles in the first round. Players James Life and Anthony Paez were the BBL's two leading scorers, Paez leading the league with 24.5 points per game. Centre Shaun Durant led the league in rebounds with 11.2 per game. Wolves also reached the semi-finals of the BBL Trophy in Sheffield. Anthony Paez finished second in MVP voting in the BBL. Point Guard Chuck Evans recorded back to back triple doubles earlier in the season.

2008–09 season
The 2008–09 season wouldn’t be quite as successful as the previous, and started off with a dismal run of defeats including a 135–103 blowout away to Cheshire Jets on the opening weekend of the campaign, as Wolves waited for their point guard, Will Funn and other import to be cleared to play. In fact, it wasn’t until Wolves’ fifth game of the season, at Everton Tigers, that the first victory came, the result was an impressive 101–106 win against a team who had previously gone undefeated. Anthony Paez posted an incredible 31 points for Wolves in that game.

The team saw first round exits in both the Trophy and the BBL Cup and also missed out on the post-season Play-offs, finishing in 10th place with a 14–24 overall record, (11–22 BBL Championship) down slightly from the previous season. At one point the club was 9–12 after a three-game winning streak only to lose starting import point guard for the season. Following the end of the campaign the club announced on 19 May 2009, that player/coach Harker would be replaced by former Wolves star Chuck Evans as the team’s coach for the upcoming season, with Harker continuing as a player only.

2009–10 season
After failing to agree to his higher wage demands, franchise star Paez left the Wolves for pastures new during the close season. Days later, Wolves announced their first signing of the season, with US guard Chey Christie joining the roster after a spell in Sweden. He was later joined by British Virgin Islands international Randy George, BBL veteran Anthony Martin, and the return of Harry Disy, after his move to France broke down.

Their season didn't start off well, with an opening-day 94–81 defeat away to Milton Keynes. Following a 96–83 loss at Cheshire Jets, the team’s third defeat in three games, changes were made including the departure of new recruit Anthony Martin. Wolves’ first league win came two weeks later in a 98–80 demolition of London Capital at home, and with the signing of Martin’s replacement Nerijus Karlikanovas coming in, things were starting to look up with wins over Leicester and Milton Keynes.

However, the franchise was thrown into turmoil when, on 27 November, it was announced that six players were having their contracts terminated by the club following an unauthorised strike over racially orientated comments made by Head Coach Chuck Evans during a video analysis session. This sent the basketball community of Worcester into an uproar; the story receiving more comments than any other Worcester News story in 2009. Coach Evans ultimately handed in his resignation. Although their names were first kept confidential, the players were later identified as Randy George, Chey Christie, and Lithuanians Evaldas Zabas, Vidmantas Uzkuraitis and Nerijus Karlikanovas, with former player/coach Skouson Harker facing disciplinary action that ultimately led to his departure from the club. Harker's father wrote this letter of support for his son to the Worcester News. Due to the depletion of the roster, a weakened team including several second-team promotees lost heavily 111–59 away to Glasgow Rocks two days later. On 1 December, the BBL announced in a statement on its website that it had agreed to the postponement of Wolves’ next five games until later dates, plus in accordance with the league’s rules, the franchise had been fined an undisclosed amount. The following week the club announced the appointment of former Guildford, Thames Valley Tigers and England national team coach Paul James as Chuck Evans' successor.

=== Exiting the BBL ===
In June 2021, the owners withdrew the team from the BBL. Since the 2021–22 season, the Wolves have played in the National Basketball League (England), where they have secured successive promotions, ending the 2025-26 season as runners up in Division 1.

== Home arenas ==
St. John's Sports Centre (2000–2013)
Worcester Arena (2013–present)

== Season-by-season records ==
Season	Division	Tier	Regular Season						Post-Season	Trophy	Cup	Head Coach
Season	Division	Tier	Finish	Played	Wins	Losses	Points	Win %	Post-Season	Trophy	Cup	Head Coach
Worcester Wolves
2000–01	NBL 3	4	2nd	22	18	3	36	0.818	Semi-final	—	—	
2001–02	NBL 1	3	9th	22	7	15	14	0.318	Did not qualify	—	—	
2002–03	NBL 1	3	7th	16	6	10	12	0.375	—	Quarter-final (NT)	—	
2003–04	EBL 2	3	2nd	20	18	2	36	0.900	Winners	Winners (PC)	—	
2004–05	EBL 1	2	4th	22	13	9	26	0.591	—	—	—	
2005–06	EBL 1	2	4th	26	17	9	34	0.654	Quarter-Finals	Winners (NT)	Quarter-finals (NC)	Josh Cooprider
2006–07	BBL	1	10th	36	4	32	8	0.111	Did not qualify	1st round (BT)	1st round (BC)	Josh Cooprider
2007–08	BBL	1	8th	33	14	19	28	0.424	Quarter-Finals	1st round (BT)	Semi-finals (BC)	Skouson Harker
2008–09	BBL	1	10th	33	11	22	22	0.333	Did not qualify	1st round (BT)	1st round (BC)	Skouson Harker
2009–10	BBL	1	9th	36	18	18	36	0.500	Did not qualify	Quarter-final (BT)	Quarter-final (BC)	Chuck Evans; Paul James
2010–11	BBL	1	9th	33	15	18	30	0.455	Did not qualify	1st round (BT)	Quarter-final (BC)	Paul James
2011–12	BBL	1	3rd	30	22	8	44	0.733	Quarter-Finals	1st round (BT)	Semi-final (BC)	Paul James
2012–13	BBL	1	5th	33	20	13	40	0.606	Quarter-Finals	Semi-final (BT)	Quarter-final (BC)	Paul James
2013–14	BBL	1	3rd	33	27	6	54	0.818	Winners, beating Newcastle	Winners, beating Glasgow	Quarter-final (BC)	Paul James
2014–15	BBL	1	3rd	36	28	8	56	0.777	Quarter-Finals	Quarter-finals (BT)	Quarter-finals (BC)	Paul James
2015–16	BBL	1	4th	33	19	14	38	0.576	Quarter-Finals	Semi-finals (BT)	Quarter-finals (BC)	Paul James
2016–17	BBL	1	5th	33	20	13	40	0.606	Semi-Finals	Semi-finals (BT)	Quarter-finals (BC)	Paul James
2017–18	BBL	1	7th	33	19	14	38	0.576	Quarter-Finals	Semi-finals (BT)	Runners Up, losing to Cheshire (BC)	Paul James
2018–19	BBL	1	11th	33	6	27	12	0.182	Did not qualify	1st round (BT)	Quarter-finals (BC)	Ty Shaw; Tony Garbelotto
2019–20	BBL	1	Season cancelled due to COVID-19 pandemic							1st round (BT)	Winners, beating Bristol (BC)	Matthew Newby
2020–21	BBL	1	6th	30	14	16	28	0.467	Quarter-finals	Quarter-finals (BT)	Pool Stage (BC)	Matthew Newby
2021–22	NBL D3	4	1st	16	15	1	30	0.938	Runners-Up	-	1st round (NC)	Dean Blake
2022–23	NBL D2	3	3rd	22	15	7	30	0.682	Semi-finals	-	1st round (NC)	Dean Blake
2022–23	NBL D2	3	6th	22	10	12	20	0.455	Did not qualify	-		Dean Blake

Notes:

- In 2001 the NBL was restructured so Division One became the third tier replacing Division Two.
- In 2003 the NBL was replaced by the EBL which reverted Division Two back to the third tier.

== Honours ==
Playoffs

- BBL Playoff Winners: 2013-14

Cup

- BBL Cup Winners: 2019-20

Trophy

- BBL Trophy Winners: 2013-14

Other

- NBL Division Two Playoff Winners: 2003–04
- National Trophy Winners: 2005–06
- Patron's Cup Winners: 2003–04

== Players ==
=== Current roster ===
Note: Flags indicate national team, as has been defined under FIBA eligibility rules. Players may hold more than one non-FIBA nationality.

No.	Pos.	Nat.	Player
4		(United Kingdom) GBR	John Lenton-Jinks
9	G	(United Kingdom) GBR	Lucas Mcgregor
18	G	(United Kingdom) GBR	Shaun Parren-Rackley
		(Spain) ESP	Sergi Estany

=== Notable former players ===
- (Indonesia) Lester Prosper
- (Nigeria) Alex Owumi
- (United States) Will Creekmore
- (Portugal) (Serbia) Stefan Djukic
- (United Kingdom) Zachariah Noble
- (United States) Chuck Evans
- (United States) Tommy Freeman
- (United States) Richie Gordon
- (Germany) Markus Hallgrimson
- (Canada) Skouson Harker
- (Canada) Marek Klassen
- (Lithuania) Arnas Kazlauskas
- (United Kingdom) Barry Lamble
- (United States) (Puerto Rico) James Life
- (United Kingdom) Anthony Martin
- (Lithuania) Artūras Masiulis
- (United Kingdom) James Noel
- (Sweden) Andreas Schreiber
- (United States) Anthony Paez
- (United States) Zaire Taylor
- (United Kingdom) Stuart Thomson
- (Lithuania) Evaldas Zabas
- (Lithuania) Aleksas Zimnickas
- (France) Harry Disy
- (United Kingdom) David Watts
- (United Kingdom) Callum Jones

== See also ==
- Basketball in England
- British Basketball League
- University of Worcester
