= Yamhill High Flyers =

- Founded: 2009
- Folded: 2012
- League: IBL 2009–2012
- Team history: Yamhill HighFlyers; 2009–2012
- Based in: McMinnville, Oregon
- Arena: Linfield College; 2009–2012
- Colors
- Owner: YHF Entertainment, LLC
- Head coach: Bubba Jones
- Championships: 0

The Yamhill HighFlyers were an International Basketball League team based in McMinnville, Oregon. It was the first professional sports franchise of Yamhill County, Oregon. The team was founded by owner/general manager Eric Bailey in 2009 and was operated by YHF Entertainment, LLC. The High Flyers worked to gain the support of local business and offer opportunities for local athletes. The team did not field a team in 2013. The voice of the HighFlyers was the local radio personality Brian Eriksen, games were carried on local radio station KLYC 1260AM.

== 2009 Season ==
The HighFlyers played an abbreviated four game schedule in 2009 for their branding year. Home games were played on Thursday May 28 against Japan's Nippon Tornadoes and on Friday June 26 against the Vancouver BC Titans. Both games were played at Patton Middle School in McMinnville, Oregon.

== 2010 Season ==
Following the abbreviated 2009 branding season, the HighFlyers played a full 20 game schedule in 2010. These games were split between being played at McMinnville High School and Linfield College's Ted Wilson Gym. The team made it to the IBL semi-finals, losing to the Bellingham Slam, and falling just short of playing in the IBL Championship. Four HighFlyers were named IBL All-Stars: Jason Hartford, Curtis Nash, Durrell Nevels, and Nate Bowie. Roughly half of the Yamhill team went on to sign professional basketball contracts in Europe.

== 2012 Season ==
The HighFlyers returned to play another abbreviated season in 2012. The 2012 Schedule:

Date	Away team	@	Home team
Friday, June 8	HighFlyers	@	Edmonton Energy
Saturday, June 9	HighFlyers	@	Edmonton Energy
Friday, June 15	Japan Nippon Tornadoes	@	HighFlyers
Friday, June 22	Vancouver Volcanoes	@	HighFlyers
Saturday, June 23	Highflyers	@	Bellingham Slam
