= BC Titans =

- Founded: 2008
- League: IBL (2009–2010)
- Team history: Vancouver Titans (2008-2009); BC Titans (2010)
- Based in: Langley, British Columbia
- Arena: Langley Events Centre
- Colours: Green, blue, and white
- Owner: Jonathan Mara
- Head coach: Scott Allen
- Championships: 0

The BC Titans were a professional basketball team in the International Basketball League located in Langley, British Columbia. The team name was announced on April 2, 2008 and the Titans started play in 2009. The Titans played all home games at the Langley Events Centre. The Titans joined the International Basketball League as the second Canadian team, after Edmonton Energy.

They were previously known as the Vancouver Titans. To reduce confusion with the Vancouver Volcanoes, the Titans changed their name to the BC Titans for the 2010 season.

According to a statement posted on their website, the team declined to participate in the 2011 season, effectively shutting down the team.

== See also ==
- Canada Basketball
