= James Life =

Puerto Rican-American basketball player

James Jimmy Life (born October 19, 1983, in Fort Myers, Florida) is an American professional basketball player, currently starring in the British Basketball League for the Worcester Wolves.

The 6'4" Shooting guard signed for Worcester in 2007, after graduating from the University of Massachusetts Amherst where he majored in sociology. He earned a reputation while playing for the UMass Minutemen as a three-point specialist, in his senior year finishing fifth-best in single-season 3-pointers (With 87) in UMass history, whilst also being all-time sixth in career 3-pointers made (148) and 3-point field goal attempts at 425. Life's ability to shoot from anywhere on the court would lead to all deep 3-pointers being dubbed “from Life Range”.

He has represented the Puerto Rico national team, as his mother is Puerto Rican. He played at 2010 Centrobasket and the 2010 Central American and Caribbean Games.
