= Portland Chinooks =

- Founded: 2004
- Folded: 2014
- League: IBL 2004-2014
- Team history: Portland Chinooks; 2004-2014
- Based in: Portland, Oregon
- Arena: Eastmoreland Courts
- Colors: Red, black and white
- Owner: Terry Emmert
- Head coach: Trevor Kiser
- Championships: 0
- Website: http://www.ibl.com/portland_chinooks

The Portland Chinooks were a professional men's basketball team based out of Portland, Oregon. They were charter members of the International Basketball League and began play in the league in 2004. The team was owned by local businessman Terry Emmert. They played their home games at various locations since their inception, including the Peter Stott Center, the Rose Garden, and at Eastmoreland Courts in southeast Portland. The team colors of red and black were shared with their predecessors from the NBA, the Portland Trail Blazers.

Emmert, who bought the team due in part to his problems with the ABA's Portland Reign, did not escape problems with the Chinooks in his attempt to bring minor league hoops to Portland. His choice to have home games played at Portland's Eastmoreland Racquet Club created a furor among members, and forced the Chinooks to find a new venue for the team's second season (this decision was also influenced by the need for a larger venue).

The team was a strong success on the court, going 14–8 to grab third in the west. Lincoln Smith (24.1 ppg) and Kenny Tate (21.8 ppg) made the league's top 25 in scoring.

For 2006, the team reportedly pursued several venues, and played their home opener at the Rose Garden on March 12. The team's scheduled venue for the 2014 season was the Eastmoreland Courts.

== Oregon Waves ==
The Oregon Waves was a team of the International Basketball League set to begin play for the 2009 season. Based in Beaverton, the Waves play at the Beaverton Hoop YMCA. The Waves are the second IBL franchise in the Portland metropolitan area after the folding of the charter IBL franchise Portland Chinooks.

== Standings ==
Regular Season
Year	Wins	Losses	Percentage	League	Division
2005	14	8	.636	5th - IBL	3rd - West Division
2006	9	11	.450	15th - IBL	9th - West Division
2007	20	7	.785	3rd - IBL	1st - West Division
Overall	43	26	.622		
