= University of Worcester Arena =

Sports venue in Worcester

Coordinates: 52.1927°N 2.2317°W

- Worcester Arena
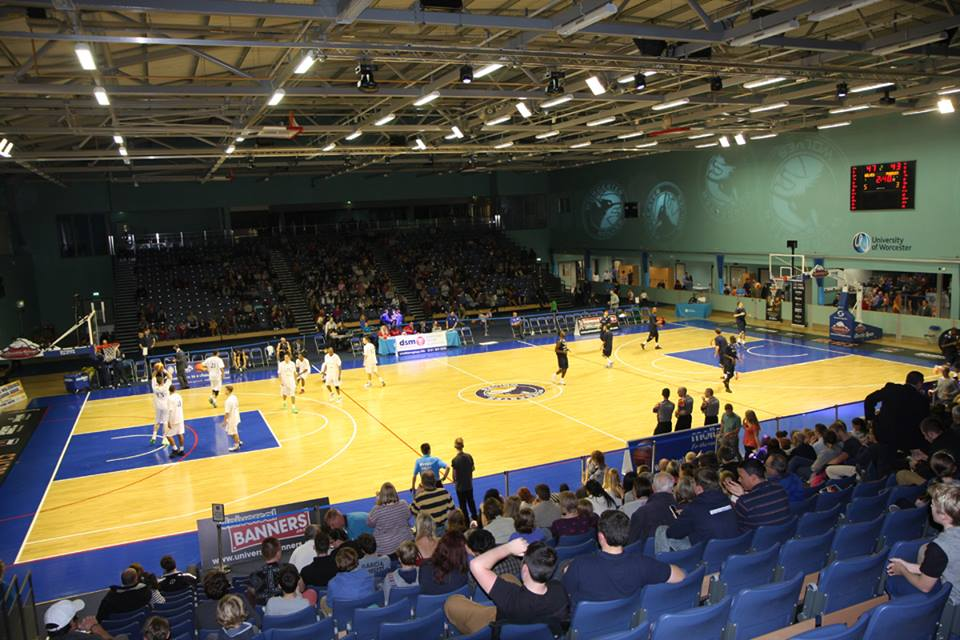
- Interactive map of University of Worcester Arena
- Location: Hylton Road; Worcester; WR2 5JN
- Owner: University of Worcester
- Capacity: 2,000

Construction
- Groundbreaking: 2012
- Opened: 12 April 2013
- Cost: £15 million
- Architect: Roberts Limbrick

Tenant
- Worcester Wolves (BBL)

The University of Worcester Arena, commonly referred to as Worcester Arena, is a multi-purpose sports venue and events arena in Worcester, England. The 2,000-seat capacity venue opened in April 2013 and is the home arena of Worcester Wolves basketball team, whilst also being a national centre of excellence for disability sports.

Plans for the construction of a new sports arena were first unveiled in January 2010 after the University of Worcester had purchased land on Hylton Road used previously as a fruit and vegetable market. Initial reports indicated the capacity of the new venue would seat 1,500 people, cost £10 million and would be due to open in the Spring of 2012.

Willmott Dixon was appointed as the project's developer, working alongside architect Roberts Limbrick. Construction of the sports arena started in early 2012 and was due to be completed by January 2013 but several delays during construction meant that the opening of arena was setback until April 2013.

The University of Worcester officially announced the opening of the new sports arena on 12 April 2013, completed at a cost of £15 million. The first event to be staged at the arena was the 2013 Netball Superleague Grand Final which saw Team Bath defeat Celtic Dragons 62-56. 1,509 spectators attended the inaugural event, which was heralded as a resounding success by local media.

Worcester Wolves made their first official appearance at their new home on 4 October, marking the occasion with a 73–61 victory over the reigning British Basketball League champions Leicester Riders.

The Arena has been the home of the annual British Winter Guard Championships - organised by Winter Guard United Kingdom (www.wguk.org.uk) - since 2017.
