= Anthony Paez =

American basketball player

Personal information
- Born: June 18, 1984 (age 41) Brooklyn, New York
- Listed height: 6 ft 7 in (201 cm)

Anthony Paez (born 1984) is an American basketball player, who played professionally in Europe. He played varsity basketball at Lehigh Senior High School in Florida, where he set the school record for most career points and won the Class 4A District 12 championships. He played NCAA basketball at Stephen F. Austin State University. He then signed with Danish club AaB Aalborg for the 2006-7 season, where he led league in scoring, followed by a few years with the Worcester Wolves in the British Basketball League where he became a league star. Paez returned to the Florida where he became a high school basketball coach.

== Early life and education ==
Paez was born on June 18, 1984, in Brooklyn, New York. His father, Bernardo Paez, had played football at the University of Pittsburgh. The family moved to Lehigh Acres, Florida in 1994.

== Varsity basketball ==
Paez attended Lehigh Senior High School, graduating in 2022. Paez finished his high school career with a school record 1,708 points and, in his senior year, was named to the Class 4A All State Second Team. He also played in the City of Palms Classic opposite Leon Powe. He led the team to wins at the Class 4A District 12 championships, the school's first, and the Pepsi Big Eight Invitational.

After high school, Paez attended Central Florida Community College in Ocala where he led the team in points and rebounds in first year. At the end of the first year, he made the decision to stay for a second year to get more playing time rather than to be a second stringer at a bigger school. At CFCC, he was named a junior college All-American.

Paez obtained an associates degree from CFCC and transferred to Stephen F. Austin State University in Texas where he majored in kinesiology and played college basketball from 2004-2006. In the 2004–05 season, Paez made appearances in 27 games, averaging 27 minutes per game, as well as 10.8 points per game, 4.6 rebounds per game and a .705 free-throw percentage. In his second season, his stats improved slightly as did his minutes. In 29 appearances, the small forward averaged 11.6 points and 4.7 boards per outing.

== Professional basketball ==
After graduation, Paez signed a deal with Danish club AaB Aalborg for the 2006-7 season. He led the league with an average of 27.73 points per game, and was named to the Basketliga All-Star Game and finishing 2nd in the 2007 Slam Dunk competition.

In 2007, he joined the Worcester Wolves in the British Basketball League where he soon became a league star.

== Coaching ==
After playing, Paez returned to Florida where he became a high school basketball coach. He was an assistant coach of the East Lee County boys team, followed by two years as the head coach for the girls team, followed by two years in the top job for the boys team from 2014 to 2016.

== Career history ==
- 2006-07 (Denmark) AaB Aalborg
- 2007-2008 (United Kingdom) Worcester Wolves
- 2008–present (Hungary) Dombóvár KC
- 2008–present (United Kingdom) Worcester Wolves
- 2009-2010 (Austria) Oberwart Gunners
