= 2016–17 English Basketball League season =

2016–17 NBL season
- League: English Basketball League
- Sport: Basketball
- Teams: 96

Regular-season

English Basketball League seasons
- ← 2015–16 2017–18 →

The 2016–17 season was the 45th edition of the National Basketball League of England. Northumbria University won their 1st league title.

== NBL1 ==
=== Regular season ===
Pos	Team	Pld	W	L	GF	GA	GD	Pts	
1	Team Northumbria (C)	26	23	3	2161	1869	+292	46	League Champions
2	Manchester Magic	26	21	5	2056	1755	+301	42	Qualification to playoffs
3	Reading Rockets	26	20	6	2335	2021	+314	40	Qualification to playoffs
4	Derby Trailblazers	26	16	10	2076	1953	+123	32	Qualification to playoffs
5	Loughborough University	26	15	11	1943	1855	+88	30	Qualification to playoffs
6	Solent Kestrels	26	15	11	2052	1982	+70	30	Qualification to playoffs
7	Bradford Dragons	26	14	12	2346	2307	+39	28	Qualification to playoffs
8	Hemel Storm	26	13	13	2223	2192	+31	26	Qualification to playoffs
9	Leicester Warriors	26	11	15	1985	2032	−47	22	
10	London Lituanica	26	11	15	1899	2111	−212	22	
11	Lancashire Spinners	26	7	19	1922	2118	−196	14	
12	Worthing Thunder	26	7	19	2020	2214	−194	14	
13	Essex Leopards (R)	26	6	20	1948	2092	−144	12	Relegation to NBL2
14	Westminster Warriors (R)	26	2	24	1791	2256	−465	4	Relegation to NBL2

Source: https://www.basketballengland.co.uk/fixtures-and-results/national-league-tables
(C) Champions; (R) Relegated

=== Playoffs ===
==== Quarter-finals ====
1 April 2017

Manchester Magic	87–62	Bradford Dragons

2 April 2017

Team Northumbria	94–75	Hemel Storm

2 April 2017

Reading Rockets	71–87	Solent Kestrels

2 April 2017

Derby Trailblazers	61–78	Loughborough University

==== Semi-finals ====
8 April 2017

Manchester Magic	89–73	Solent Kestrels

9 April 2017

Team Northumbria	57–75	Loughborough University

==== Final ====
23 April 2017
15:30 GMT

Manchester Magic	73–53	Loughborough University

National Basketball Performance Centre, Manchester

== NBL2 ==
=== Regular season ===
Pos	Team	Pld	W	L	GF	GA	GD	Pts	
1	Kent Crusaders (C, P)	22	19	3	1752	1388	+364	38	Promotion to NBL1
2	Newcastle University (P)	22	19	3	1586	1371	+215	38	Promotion to NBL1
3	Thames Valley Cavaliers	22	18	4	1969	1702	+267	36	Qualification to playoffs
4	Ipswich	22	12	10	1870	1698	+172	24	Qualification to playoffs
5	London Westside	22	11	11	1548	1563	−15	22	Qualification to playoffs
6	Nottingham Hoods	22	10	12	1517	1497	+20	20	Qualification to playoffs
7	Tees Valley Mohawks	22	9	13	1723	1845	−122	18	Qualification to playoffs
8	Derbyshire Arrows	22	8	14	1585	1697	−112	16	Qualification to playoffs
9	London Greenhouse Pioneers	22	8	14	1078	1248	−170	16	
10	Liverpool	22	7	15	1546	1770	−224	14	
11	Doncaster Danum Eagles (R)	22	6	16	1520	1740	−220	12	Relegation to NBL3
12	Newham Neptunes (R)	22	5	17	1654	1847	−193	10	Relegation to NBL3

Source: https://www.basketballengland.co.uk/fixtures-and-results/national-league-tables
(C) Champions; (P) Promoted; (R) Relegated

== NBL3 ==
North Division

Pos	Team	Pld	W	L	%	Pts
1	Birmingham Elite	20	17	3	0.850	34
2	University of Chester	20	16	4	0.800	32
3	Charnwood College	20	16	4	0.800	32
4	Stoke-on-Trent Knights	20	14	6	0.700	28
5	Birmingham Mets	20	11	9	0.550	22
6	Myerscough College Spinners	20	9	11	0.450	18
7	Worcester Wolves II	20	9	11	0.450	18
8	Sheffield Hallam Sharks	20	8	12	0.400	16
9	Coventry Tornadoes	20	7	13	0.350	14
10	Mansfield Giants	20	2	18	0.100	4
11	Sefton Stars	20	0	20	0.000	0

South Division

Pos	Team	Pld	W	L	%	Pts
1	Middlesex LTBC	18	15	3	0.833	30
2	Sussex Bears	18	13	5	0.722	26
3	Solent Kestrels II	18	12	6	0.667	24
4	Brunel University	18	11	7	0.611	22
5	Cardiff Met Archers	18	10	8	0.556	20
6	Southwark Pride	18	9	9	0.500	18
7	Greenwich Titans	18	8	10	0.444	16
8	Northants Thunder	18	5	13	0.278	10
9	Oxford Brookes University	18	5	13	0.278	10
10	Thames Valley Cavaliers II	18	1	17	0.056	2

=== Playoffs ===
==== Quarter-finals ====
1 April 2017

Team Birmingham Elite	81–67	Brunel University

1 April 2017

University of Chester	77–81	Solent Kestrels II

1 April 2017

Sussex Bears	95–64	Charnwood College

2 April 2017

Middlesex LTBC	87–71	Stoke-on-Trent Knights

==== Semi-finals ====
8 April 2017

Team Birmingham Elite	79–71	Sussex Bears

9 April 2017

Middlesex LTBC	90–83	Solent Kestrels II

==== Final ====
22 April 2017
16:30 GMT

Team Birmingham Elite	62–63	Middlesex LTBC

National Basketball Performance Centre, Manchester

== NBL4 ==
North

Team	Pld	W	L
1. Manchester Giants II	18	17	1
2. Sunderland University	18	14	4
3. Leeds Force Academy	18	12	6
4. Tameside	18	12	6
5. Calderdale Explorers	18	11	7
6. Kingston Panthers	18	7	11
7. Kendal Warriors	18	6	12
8. Barrow Thorns	18	4	14
9. Stockport Falcons	18	4	14
10. Sefton Stars II	18	3	15

Midlands

Team	Pld	W	L
1. Northants Taurus	18	16	2
2. Wolverhampton Univ.	18	16	2
3. Shropshire Warriors	18	13	5
4. Warwickshire Hawks	18	10	8
5. City of Birmingham	18	10	8
6. Nottingham Hoods II	18	7	11
7. Kings Lynn Fury	18	6	12
5. Derby Trailblazers II	18	6	12
9. Sheffield Sabres	18	4	14
10. Birmingham Mets II	18	2	16

South East

Team	Pld	W	L
1. Essex Blades	18	14	4
2. Middlesex Saxons	18	13	5
3. Barking Abbey	18	12	6
4. London Thunder	18	12	6
5. Chelmsford Lions	18	11	7
6. Kent Crusaders II	18	11	7
7. Folkestone Saints	18	8	10
8. Oaklands Wolves	18	5	13
9. Cambridge Cats	18	4	14
10. Anglia Ruskin Univ.	18	0	18

South West

Team	Pld	W	L
1. Swindon Shock	16	12	4
2. Cardiff City	16	12	4
3. RCT Gladiators	16	11	5
4. Bristol Storm	16	8	8
5. Woking Blackhawks	16	7	9
6. Reading Rockets II	16	7	9
7. Oxford Stealers	16	5	11
8. Southampton Univ.	16	5	11
9. Plymouth Rebels	16	4	12

=== First round ===
Manchester Giants II	88–55	Bristol Storm

Northants Tauras	87–81	Warwickshire Hawks

Swindon Shock	61–55	Barking Abbey Crusaders

Sunderland University	C–W	Leeds Force Academy

Cardiff City	59–52	Shropshire Warriors

Middlesex Saxons	116–78	RCT Gladiators

Essex Blades	85–69	Tameside

Wolverhampton University	78–65	London Thunder

=== Quarter-finals ===
1 April 2017

Northants Tauras	103–85	Cardiff City

1 April 2017

Essex Blades	77–89	Leeds Force Academy

1 April 2017

Swindon Shock	76–75	Wolverhampton University

1 April 2017

Manchester Giants II	W–C	Middlesex Saxons

=== Semi-finals ===
8 April 2017

Northants Tauras	102–92	Leeds Force Academy

9 April 2017

Manchester Giants II	72–79	Swindon Shock

=== Final ===
22 April 2017
12:00 GMT

Swindon Shock	91–96	Northants Tauras

National Basketball Performance Centre, Manchester
