= 2015–16 National Basketball League (England) season =

2015–16 NBL season
- League: English Basketball League
- Sport: Basketball
- Teams: 95

Regular Season

English Basketball League seasons
- ← 2014–15 2016–17 →

The 2015–16 season was the 44th edition of the National Basketball League of England. Manchester Magic won their second league title.

== NBL1 ==
=== Regular season ===
Pos	Team	Pld	W	L	GF	GA	GD	Pts	
1	Manchester Magic (C)	26	23	3	2144	1696	+448	46	League Champions
2	Derby Trailblazers	26	19	7	2156	1952	+204	38	Qualification to playoffs
3	Reading Rockets	26	19	7	2033	1904	+129	38	Qualification to playoffs
4	Hemel Storm	26	18	8	2198	2109	+89	36	Qualification to playoffs
5	Team Northumbria	26	16	10	1918	1824	+94	32	Qualification to playoffs
6	Essex Leopards	26	16	10	1996	1882	+114	32	Qualification to playoffs
7	Lancashire Spinners	26	16	10	2101	2042	+59	32	Qualification to playoffs
8	London Lituanica	26	16	10	1986	1911	+75	32	Qualification to playoffs
9	Leicester Warriors	26	10	16	1891	1909	−18	20	
10	Worthing Thunder	26	10	16	2007	2109	−102	20	
11	Westminster Warriors	26	6	20	1980	2146	−166	12	
12	Bradford Dragons	26	6	20	1963	2134	−171	12	
13	Tees Valley Mohawks (R)	26	4	22	1878	2171	−293	8	Relegation to NBL2
14	Kent Crusaders (R)	26	3	23	1631	2093	−462	6	Relegation to NBL2

Source: https://www.basketballengland.co.uk/fixtures-and-results/national-league-tables
(C) Champions; (R) Relegated

=== Playoffs ===
==== Quarter-finals ====
2 April 2016
18:30

Manchester Magic	71–55	London Lituanica

Amaechi Basketball Centre, Manchester

2 April 2016
19:15

Derby Trailblazers	91–61	Lancashire Spinners

Noel Baker School, Derby

3 April 2016
17:00

Reading Rockets	102–84	Essex Leopards

Rivermead Leisure Complex, Reading

2 April 2016
19:00

Hemel Storm	85–95	Team Northumbria

Sportspace, Hemel Hempstead

==== Semi-finals ====
9 April 2016
18:30

Manchester Magic	77–45	Team Northumbria

Amaechi Basketball Centre, Manchester

9 April 2016
19:30

Derby Trailblazers	69–72	Reading Rockets

Noel Baker School, Derby

==== Final ====
24 April 2016
16:00

Manchester Magic	72–65	Reading Rockets

National Basketball Performance Centre, Manchester

== NBL2 ==
=== Regular season ===
Pos	Team	Pld	W	L	GF	GA	GD	Pts	
1	Solent Kestrels (C, P)	22	18	4	1635	1361	+274	36	Promotion to NBL1
2	Loughborough University (P)	22	17	5	1573	1214	+359	34	Promotion to NBL1
3	London Greenhouse Pioneers	22	16	6	1460	1270	+190	32	Qualification to playoffs
4	Nottingham Hoods	22	15	7	1638	1447	+191	30	Qualification to playoffs
5	Ipswich	22	13	9	1694	1596	+98	26	Qualification to playoffs
6	East London All Stars	22	13	9	1751	1667	+84	26	Qualification to playoffs
7	Liverpool	22	12	10	1704	1532	+172	24	Qualification to playoffs
8	Derbyshire Arrows	22	11	11	1647	1736	−89	22	Qualification to playoffs
9	Brixton Topcats	22	6	16	1272	1445	−173	12	
10	London Westside	22	5	17	1185	1402	−217	10	
11	Worcester Wolves II (R)	22	3	19	1303	1700	−397	6	Relegation to NBL3; North/South
12	Eastside Eagles (R)	22	2	20	1227	1709	−482	4	Relegation to NBL3; North/South

Source: https://www.basketballengland.co.uk/fixtures-and-results/national-league-tables
(C) Champions; (P) Promoted; (R) Relegated

=== Playoffs ===
==== Quarter-finals ====
2 April 2016
14:00

Loughborough University	66–73	Liverpool

Loughborough University

2 April 2016
18:30

Nottingham Hoods	80–55	Ipswich

Nottingham Wildcats Arena, Nottingham

3 April 2016
14:00

London Greenhouse Pioneers	66–60	East London All-Stars

Academy Sport, London

3 April 2016
14:30

Solent Kestrels	80–79	Derbyshire Arrows

St Mary's Leisure Centre, Southampton

==== Semi-finals ====
10 April 2016
16:30

Solent Kestrels	70–51	Nottingham Hoods

St Mary's Leisure Centre, Southampton

10 April 2016
13:00

Liverpool	76–75	London Greenhouse Pioneers

Archbishop Beck Catholic Sports College, Liverpool

==== Final ====
24 April 2016
13:30

Solent Kestrels	75–80	Liverpool

National Basketball Performance Centre, Manchester

== NBL3 ==
=== Regular season ===
North Division

Pos	Team	Pld	W	L	%	Pts
1	Newcastle University	20	19	1	0.950	38
2	Doncaster Danum Eagles	20	16	4	0.800	32
3	NULC Knights	20	12	8	0.600	24
4	Sefton Stars	20	12	8	0.600	24
5	Birmingham Elite	20	12	8	0.600	24
6	City of Sheffield Saints	20	8	12	0.400	16
7	Birmingham Mets	20	8	12	0.400	16
8	Mansfield Giants	20	7	13	0.350	14
9	Myerscough College	20	7	13	0.350	14
10	Derby Trailblazers II	20	6	14	0.300	12
11	Leeds Force Academy	20	2	18	0.100	4

South Division

Pos	Team	Pld	W	L	%	Pts
1	Thames Valley Cavaliers	22	21	1	0.955	42
2	Brunel University	22	15	7	0.682	30
3	Oxford Brookes University	22	14	8	0.636	28
4	Team Solent	22	14	8	0.636	28
5	Middlesex LTBC	22	13	9	0.591	26
6	Plymouth Raiders II	22	12	10	0.545	24
7	London United	22	8	14	0.364	16
8	Brentwood Fire	22	8	14	0.364	16
9	Northants Thunder	22	8	14	0.364	16
10	Loughborough University II	22	7	15	0.318	14
11	Barking Abbey Crusaders	22	6	16	0.273	12
12	Barking & Dagenham Thunder	22	5	17	0.227	10

=== Playoffs ===
==== Quarter-finals ====
2 April 2016
18:00

Team Newcastle University	82–61	Team Solent

Sport Central, Northumbria University

2 April 2016
13:00

Doncaster Danum Eagles	105–77	Oxford Brookes University

Danum Academy, Doncaster

3 April 2016
17:00

Thames Valley Cavaliers	100–70	Sefton Stars

East Berkshire College, Slough

2 April 2016
18:00

Brunel University Ducks	93–74	NULC Knights

Brunel University, London

==== Semi-finals ====
10 April 2016
13:00

Team Newcastle University	105–70	Brunel University Ducks

Tyne Metropolitan College, Newcastle

10 April 2016
17:00

Thames Valley Cavaliers	99–90	Doncaster Danum Eagles

Uxbridge College, Greater London

== NBL Development League ==
=== Regular season ===
North East

Team	Pld	W	L	Pts
1. Gateshead Phoenix	12	11	1	22
2. Sheffield Hallam Sharks	12	9	3	18
3. Sheffield Sabres	12	8	4	16
4. Sunderland City Predators	12	6	6	12
5. Nottingham Hoods II	12	5	7	10
6. Kingston Panthers	12	2	10	4
7. Derby Trailblazers III	12	1	11	2

South East

Team	Pld	W	L	Pts
1. Greenwich Titans	18	16	2	32
2. Southwark Pride	17	15	2	30
3. Kings Lynn Fury	18	15	3	30
4. Essex Blades	18	10	8	20
5. London Thunder	18	9	9	18
6. Dagenham Dragons	16	7	9	14
7. Cambridge Cats	18	7	11	14
8. West Herts Warriors	18	5	13	10
9. Northants Taurus	18	3	15	6
10. Anglia Ruskin University	17	1	16	2

North West

Team	Pld	W	L	Pts
1. University of Chester	16	14	2	28
2. Prestons College Titans	15	13	2	26
3. Blackburn College Spinners	16	13	3	26
4. Tameside	16	9	7	18
5. Manchester Magic II	16	8	8	16
6. Calderdale Explorers	16	8	8	16
7. Liverpool BC II	16	3	13	6
8. Kendal Warriors	15	2	13	4
9. Carlisle Panthers	16	1	15	2

South

Team	Pld	W	L	Pts
1. Sussex Bears	12	10	2	20
2. Thames Valley Cavaliers II	12	9	3	18
3. Kent Crusaders II	12	7	5	14
4. Woking Blackhawk Flyers	12	6	6	12
5. Southampton University	12	5	7	10
6. Folkestone Saints	12	4	8	8
7. Reading Rockets II	12	1	11	2

South West

Team	Pld	W	L	Pts
1. Cardiff Met Archers	20	15	5	30
2. Coventry Tornadoes	19	13	6	26
3. City of Birmingham	20	12	8	24
4. Sporting Club Albion	20	12	8	24
5. Cardiff City	20	12	8	24
6. Bristol Flyers II	19	10	9	20
7. Oxford City Hoops	20	9	11	18
8. Shropshire Warriors	20	9	11	18
9. Swindon Shock	19	8	11	16
10. Oxford Stealers	20	6	14	12
11. Birmingham Mets II	19	2	17	4

=== Playoffs ===
==== First round ====
19 March 2016
14:00

Gateshead Phoenix (1)	65–54	Sporting Club Albion (16)

Gateshead Leisure Centre

19 March 2016
12:15

Greenwich Titans (2)	61–91	Kent Crusaders II (15)

Thomas Tallis School

19 March 2016
18:00

University of Chester (3)	70–66	City of Birmingham (14)

Ellesmere Port Sports Village

19 March 2016
15:00

Sussex Bears (4)	C–C	Sheffield Sabres (13)

Sir Robert Woodard Academy

19 March 2016
16:30

Cardiff Met Archers (5)	87–68	Blackburn College Spinners (12)

Archers Arena

19 March 2016
16:15

Southwark Pride (6)	89–77	Kings Lynn Fury (11)

City of London Academy

19 March 2016
19:00

Prestons College Titans (7)	89–69	Coventry Tornadoes (10)

Prestons College Sports Centre

19 March 2016
15:00

Sheffield Hallam Sharks (8)	78–68	Thames Valley Cavaliers II (9)

Parkwood Academy

==== Quarter-finals ====
3 April 2016
13:00

Gateshead Phoenix (1)	79–65	Sheffield Hallam Sharks (8)

Tyne Metropolitan College

2 April 2016
15:00

Kent Crusaders II (15)	74–63	Prestons College Titans (7)

Brompton Academy

2 April 2016
12:00

University of Chester (3)	85–77	Southwark Pride (6)

Ellesmere Port Sports Village

2 April 2016
15:00

Sussex Bears (4)	87–70	Cardiff Met Archers (5)

Sir Robert Woodard Academy

==== Semi-finals ====
9 April 2016
14:00

Gateshead Phoenix (1)	94–74	Sussex Bears (4)

Gateshead Leisure Centre

9 April 2016
14:30

Kent Crusaders II (15)	vs.	University of Chester (3)

Brompton Academy

==== Final ====
23 April 2016
14:30

Gateshead Phoenix (1)	66–62	University of Chester (3)

Belle Vue National Performance Centre, Manchester
