= 2017–18 National Basketball League (England) season =

2017–18 NBL season
- League: National Basketball League
- Teams: 90

2017–18

English Basketball League seasons
- ← 2016–17 2018–19 →

The 2017–18 season was the 46th edition of the National Basketball League of England. Loughborough University won their 1st league title.

== NBL1 ==
=== Teams ===
Team changes

Promoted from NBL2

- Kent Crusaders
- Newcastle University

Relegated to NBL2

- Essex Leopards
- Westminster Warriors

Folded

- London Lituanica

=== Regular season ===
Pos	Team	Pld	W	L	GF	GA	GD	Pts	
1	Loughborough Riders (C)	24	20	4	1956	1617	+339	40	League Champions
2	Solent Kestrels	24	20	4	1906	1682	+224	40	Qualification to playoffs
3	Reading Rockets	24	17	7	2065	1867	+198	34	Qualification to playoffs
4	Worthing Thunder	24	16	8	2089	1969	+120	32	Qualification to playoffs
5	Northumbria University	24	16	8	1944	1788	+156	32	Qualification to playoffs
6	Bradford Dragons	24	13	11	1993	1938	+55	26	Qualification to playoffs
7	Hemel Storm	24	12	12	2003	1906	+97	24	Qualification to playoffs
8	Manchester Magic	24	11	13	1885	1905	−20	22	Qualification to playoffs
9	Leicester Warriors	24	9	15	1796	1859	−63	18	
10	Kent Crusaders	24	9	15	1774	1925	−151	18	
11	Newcastle University	24	7	17	1708	1765	−57	14	
12	Derby Trailblazers	24	6	18	1794	1964	−170	12	
13	Lancashire Spinners (R)	24	0	24	1462	2190	−728	0	Relegated to NBL2
14	London Lituanica	0	0	0	0	0	0	0	Club folded

Source: https://www.basketballengland.co.uk/competitions/nbl/standings/
(C) Champions; (R) Relegated

=== Playoffs ===
Quarter-finals

7 Apr 2018

Loughborough University	73–71	Manchester Magic

Netball and Badminton Centre

8 Apr 2018

Solent Kestrels	72–82	Hemel Storm

St. Mary's Leisure Centre

8 Apr 2018

Reading Rockets	89–78	Bradford Dragons

Rivermead Leisure Complex

7 Apr 2018

Worthing Thunder	98–89	Northumbria University

Worthing Leisure Centre

Semi-finals

14 Apr 2018

Statcast

Loughborough University	65–76	Worthing Thunder

Victory Hall, Loughborough University

14 Apr 2018

Statacast

Hemel Storm	98–75	Reading Rockets

Hemel Sports Centre

Final

29 Apr 2018

Worthing Thunder	67–57	Hemel Storm

National Basketball Performance Centre, Manchester

== NBL2 ==
=== Teams ===
Team changes

Promoted to NBL1

- Kent Crusaders
- Newcastle University

Relegated from NBL1

- Essex Leopards
- Westminster Warriors

Promoted from NBL3

- Birmingham Elite
- Middlesex LTBC
- Sussex Bears

Relegated to NBL3

- East London All-Stars

Folded

- Doncaster Danum Eagles (relegated)
- Tees Valley Mohawks

=== Regular season ===
Pos	Team	Pld	W	L	GF	GA	GD	Pts	
1	Nottingham Hoods (C, P)	22	20	2	1956	1526	+430	40	League Champions
2	Thames Valley Cavaliers (P)	22	18	4	2019	1734	+285	36	Qualification to playoffs
3	Liverpool	22	15	7	1634	1449	+185	30	Qualification to playoffs
4	Essex Leopards (P)	22	14	8	1793	1745	+48	28	Qualification to playoffs
5	Westminster Warriors	22	14	8	1798	1663	+135	28	Qualification to playoffs
6	Derbyshire Arrows	22	9	13	1549	1738	−189	18	Qualification to playoffs
7	London Greenhouse Pioneers	22	7	15	1553	1606	−53	14	Qualification to playoffs
8	Middlesex LTBC (Note: Middlesex LTBC received a four points deduction)	22	9	13	1531	1642	−111	14	Qualification to playoffs
9	Ipswich	22	7	15	1765	1927	−162	14	
10	Sussex Bears (Note: Sussex Bears received a two points deduction)	22	7	15	1602	1789	−187	12	
11	London Westside	22	6	16	1567	1755	−188	12	
12	Birmingham Elite (R)	22	6	16	1453	1646	−193	12	Relegated to NBL3

Source: https://www.basketballengland.co.uk/fixtures-and-results/national-league-tables
(C) Champions; (P) Promoted; (R) Relegated

=== Playoffs ===
Quarter-finals

Nottingham Hoods	97–77	Middlesex LTBC

Thames Valley Cavaliers	93–77	London Greenhouse Pioneers

Liverpool	95–57	Derbyshire Arrows

Essex Leopards	80–84	Westminster Warriors

Semi-finals

Nottingham Hoods	89–65	Westminster Warriors

Thames Valley Cavaliers	97–84	Liverpool

Final

29 Apr 2018

Nottingham Hoods	77–80	Thames Valley Cavaliers

National Basketball Performance Centre, Manchester

== NBL3 ==
=== Teams ===
Team changes

Promoted to NBL2

- Birmingham Elite
- Middlesex LTBC
- Sussex Bears

Relegated from NBL2

- East London All-Stars

Folded

- Coventry Tornadoes
- Brunel University

Promoted from NBL4

- Manchester Giants II
- Sunderland University
- Northants Taurus
- WLV Albion
- University of Essex
- Swindon Shock
- Cardiff City

Relegated to NBL4

- Sefton Stars
- Mansfield Giants
- Thames Valley Cavaliers II

=== Regular season ===
==== North Division ====
Pos	Team	Pld	W	L	GF	GA	GD	Pts
1	Myerscough College (C, P)	18	15	3	1480	1103	+377	30
2	Loughborough University II	18	13	5	1297	1192	+105	26
3	Stoke-on-Trent Knights	18	11	7	1251	1243	+8	22
4	Chester University	18	10	8	1284	1234	+50	20
5	Sunderland University	18	10	8	1208	1125	+83	20
6	Birmingham Mets	18	7	11	1143	1213	−70	14
7	WLV Albion	18	7	11	1160	1282	−122	14
8	Sheffield Sharks II	18	6	12	1149	1247	−98	12
9	Manchester Giants II (R)	18	5	13	896	1035	−139	10
10	Worcester Wolves II (R)	18	4	14	1146	1340	−194	8

Source: https://www.basketballengland.co.uk/fixtures-and-results/national-league-tables
(C) Champions; (P) Promoted; (R) Relegated

==== South Division ====
Pos	Team	Pld	W	L	GF	GA	GD	Pts
1	Greenwich Titans (C, P)	18	14	4	1438	1333	+105	28
2	Northants Taurus	18	13	5	1696	1492	+204	26
3	East London All-Stars	18	13	5	1511	1203	+308	26
4	Cardiff City	18	9	9	1510	1527	−17	18
5	Cardiff Metropolitan University	18	9	9	1370	1372	−2	18
6	University of Essex	18	9	9	1330	1285	+45	18
7	Solent Kestrels II	18	8	10	1403	1404	−1	16
8	Swindon Shock	18	6	12	1410	1415	−5	12
9	Oxford Brookes University (R)	18	6	12	1153	1481	−328	12
10	Southwark Pride (R)	18	2	16	1143	1452	−309	4

Source: https://www.basketballengland.co.uk/fixtures-and-results/national-league-tables
(C) Champions; (P) Promoted; (R) Relegated

=== Playoffs ===
Quarter-finals

Myerscough College	75–71	Cardiff City

Loughborough University II	75–82	East London All Stars

Northants Taurus	116–103	Stoke-on-Trent Knights

Greenwich Titans	W–C	Chester University

Semi-finals

Myerscough College	88–78	Northants Taurus

East London All Stars	63–57	Greenwich Titans

Final

29 April 2018

Myerscough College	71–57	East London All Stars

National Basketball Performance Centre, Manchester

== NBL4 ==
=== Regular season ===
North
Pos	Team	Pld	W	L
1	Calderdale Explorers	22	19	3
2	Sheffield Sabres	22	17	5
3	Blackpool	21	14	7
4	Tameside	21	14	7
5	Kingston Panthers	21	14	7
6	Newcastle Eagles U23	22	14	8
7	Manchester Magic II	22	10	12
8	Myerscough College II	20	9	11
9	York Vikings	21	7	14
10	Stockport Falcons	22	5	17
11	Barrow Thorns	21	3	18
12	Sefton Stars	21	0	21

Midlands
Pos	Team	Pld	W	L
1	Derby University	22	19	3
2	Derby Trailblazers II	22	19	3
3	Northants Thunder	22	16	6
4	Birmingham Rockets	22	16	6
5	Nottingham Univ.	22	15	7
6	Warwickshire Hawks	22	11	11
7	Birmingham Mets II	22	8	14
8	Shropshire Warriors	22	8	14
9	Charnwood College	22	7	15
10	Nottingham Hoods II	22	5	17
11	Mansfield Giants	22	4	18
12	Notts. Trent Univ.	22	4	18

South East
Pos	Team	Pld	W	L
1	London BC Medelynas	18	18	0
2	Barking Abbey	18	15	3
3	Richmond Knights	18	12	6
4	Kent Crusaders II	18	11	7
5	Chelmsford Lions	18	9	9
6	Lewisham Thunder	18	7	11
7	Anglia Ruskin Uni.	18	5	13
8	Folkestone Saints	18	5	13
9	Cambridge Cats	18	4	14
10	Norfolk Titans	18	4	14

South West
Pos	Team	Pld	W	L
1	Bristol Flyers II	20	17	3
2	Huish Taunton Tigers	20	17	3
3	RCT Gladiators	19	13	6
4	Reading Rockets II	20	11	9
5	Southampton Univ.	20	11	9
6	London United	20	11	9
7	Oxford City Hoops	20	10	10
8	Thames Valley Cavs II	20	9	11
9	Surrey Rams	19	4	15
10	Oxford Stealers	19	3	16
11	Gloucester Saxons	19	2	17

=== Playoffs ===
Quarter-finals

Derby University	89–54	Huish Taunton Tigers

Calderdale Explorers	58–74	Barking Abbey

Bristol Flyers II	90–109	Derby Trailblazers II

London BC Medelynas	102–82	Sheffield Sabres

Semi-finals

London B.C. Medelynas	105–100	Derby Trailblazers II

Barking Abbey	71–90	Derby University

Final

29 April 2018

London B.C. Medelynas	70–90	Derby University

National Basketball Performance Centre, Manchester

== Cup Competitions ==
=== National Cup ===
21 January 2018
15:30 GMT

http://www.fibalivestats.com/u/BBE/811070/

Hemel Storm	94–77	Manchester Magic
Scoring by quarter: 19-31, 26-16, 25-12, 24-18
Pts: A.J. Roberts (33)		Pts: Stefan Gill (24)

University of East London

=== National Trophy ===
25 February 2018
15:30 GMT

Northumbria University	74–88	Solent Kestrels
Scoring by quarter: 11-28, 19-20, 24-15, 20-25

University of Worcester Arena

=== Patrons Cup ===
25 February 2018
13:15 GMT

Westminster Warriors	86–85	Thames Valley Cavaliers
Scoring by quarter: 27-22, 14-23, 20-25, 24-16
Pts: Justin Hitchman (26)		Pts: Martelle McLemore (25)

University of Worcester Arena

=== National Shield ===
25 February 2018
11:00 GMT

Myerscough College	75–55	Solent Kestrels II
Scoring by quarter: 17-12, 18-12, 16-9, 24-22
Pts: Konrad Kantorski (17)		Pts: Bryan (16)

University of Worcester Arena
