= Essex Leopards =

Essex & Herts Leopards
- League: NBL Division 1
- Established: 1997
- Folded: 2020
- History: Ware Fire; 1997–2000; Ware Rebels; 2000–2004; Essex & Herts Leopards; 2004–2006; London Leopards; 2006–2012; Essex Leopards; 2012–2019; Essex & Herts Leopards; 2019-2020
- Arena: Brentwood Centre
- Capacity: 1,200
- Location: Essex and Hertfordshire
- Team colours
- Website: Official website

The Essex & Herts Leopards were an English semi-professional basketball club, based in Brentwood, Essex and St Albans, Hertfordshire. The Leopards competed in Division 1 of the English Basketball League. The team was established in 1997 as Ware Fire, but following the demise and eventual closure of the former British Basketball League franchise Essex Leopards in 2003, a supporters group known as 'Leopards Alive' merged with the Ware-based club and rebranded the team as Essex & Herts Leopards in 2004.

== Franchise history ==
Basketball in Ware
For much of the 1990s the town of Ware in Hertfordshire was home to National League (NBL) basketball following the arrival of the original Rebels franchise, who moved from Watford in 1991. The Rebels team consistently finished in the top three of NBL Division 1 and were crowned Champions in 1997, after finishing two points ahead of Plymouth Raiders with an overall record of 21 wins and 5 losses. Following their most successful season, the team was uprooted and moved to Stevenage to become the Stevenage Rebels, though the success didn't follow and the franchise would eventually relocate again in 1999 to become Worthing Rebels.

Following the Rebels' move to Stevenage, a brand-new team, Ware Fire, was established and admitted to NBL Division 3 for the 1997–98 season. In their rookie season they finished 7th out of 11 teams with an amicable 9–17 record. A mild improvement to 6th place in the 1998–99 season was followed with a successful campaign in 1999–00, finishing in 4th place (16–8) and earning promotion to Division 2 (though with the "clean-sheet" League restructuring that followed that season, Division 2 became the third tier division). After destroying Birmingham University 117–71 in Play-off Quarter-finals, Ware were comfortably beaten in their first Semi-final appearance, losing 84–72 away to Division champions Doncaster Eagles.

The 2000–01 season saw the club compete in Division 2 for the first time and also brought a new name for the club with the return of the Rebels name following the original club's rebranding from Worthing Rebels to Worthing Thunder in the same year. The reincarnated Ware Rebels went on to have their most successful season to date, finishing third in the Division with 17 wins and 7 losses and earning promotion to Division 1. The post-season Play-off's saw a rematch of the previous season's Semi-final match-up against Doncaster, though the new and improved Ware swept them aside with a 92–54 home victory in the Quarter-final. The Semi-finals again proved to be the stumbling block though as Ware were defeated 86–75 to eventual winners Ealing Tornadoes.

Rebels continued their rise through the League in the 2001–02 season, competing for the first time in Division 1. Another 3rd-place finish in the League with a 16–6 record and another promotion followed. The post-season Play-off's saw Rebels sweep aside Westminster Warriors 109–96 in the Quarter-finals before being matched up with familiar foes Ealing, who knocked out the Rebels for the second consecutive year with a 99–88 defeat, in the Semi-final. Ware's first appearance in the new NBL Conference for the 2002–03 season saw them pitted against much tougher opponents in the second-tier league and unsurprisingly Rebels successes of the previous season's were not replicated. Finishing 10th out of the 12 teams competing, Ware could only put together 4 victories out of 22 games, whilst missing out on the Play-off's for the first time in the club's history.

The 2003–04 season would see Rebels fare much better in the newly rebranded English Basketball League (EBL) Division 1, following a change in administration from the now defunct National Basketball League. In the 12-team competition, Ware managed to finish in 8th place with 9 wins and 13 defeats. The season saw the start of a new partnership with the University of Hertfordshire, which saw the first team use the venue facilities of the brand-new Hertfordshire Sports Village as well as their traditional Wodson Park home. However the season will be best remembered for three records broken by the Rebels, thanks in-part to the three-point shooting abilities of American-import Michael Williamson. In Rebels' 117–87 National Cup first round win over Northampton Neptunes, Williamson scored a National Cup record 13 three-pointers, scoring two within the first 10 seconds of the game, whilst the team broke the record for a team effort, scoring a 20 three-pointers in total. Two months later, Williamson along with teammates Hayden Herrin and Ben Wallis, combined to score 21 three-pointers in a 116–105 defeat to Worthing Thunder, setting a new NBL/EBL record.

Merger with Leopards Alive
In the summer of 2003 it was announced that British Basketball League (BBL) team, and twice former League champions, Essex Leopards would be dropping out of the League as a buyer for the struggling franchise could not be found. A supporters group called "Leopards Alive" was set up in September 2003, aiming to resurrect the Leopards franchise and bring professional basketball back to their base in Brentwood. Initially seeking to enter a team into the BBL, the supporters group opted for the English Basketball League due to the expected costs of running the team. It was formally announced in May 2004 that Leopards Alive and the Ware Rebels were merging for the 2004–05 season, and would be re-branded as the Essex & Herts Leopards, taking the names of both counties (Essex and Hertfordshire) they would be representing.

Jon Burnell, coach of the Ware Rebels in their final season, was given the Head Coach job for the new-look Leopards. The 2004–05 season was business as normal on-court as the team finished 8th for the second consecutive season, totalling 9 wins and 13 defeats. An early exit in the National Cup came at the hands of Nottingham Knights after a 58–62 defeat at Wodson Park in the 3rd round, whilst they didn't fare much better in the post-season Play-offs, exiting in the Quarter-final after a 103–72 defeat at the hands of Division Champions Sheffield Arrows.

It was announced in the summer of 2005, after just one season of splitting home games between both Ware's venue, Wodson Park, and Essex's Brentwood Centre, that the club would drop Wodson Park in favour of the Goresbrook Centre in Dagenham. On-court, the Leopards went from strength to strength and the 2005–06 season would prove to be one of their strongest yet. The club competed for the first time in the BBL Trophy as an invitee, though they lost all four games to Birmingham Bullets, Leicester Riders, Milton Keynes Lions and Leopards' old BBL rival London Towers . In the National Cup, Leopards fared much better and after early round victories over Colchester and London United, a 101–75 win over Solent Stars in the Quarter-final and an 84–51 Semi-final victory against Worcester Wolves, Leopards had qualified for their first National Final in the franchise's history. In front of a packed National Indoor Arena in Birmingham the Leopards defeated Reading Rockets 79–75 and claim the club's first-ever piece of silverware. In Division 1, the team finished in 6th place, the highest placing the club has achieved to date, with a 17–9 record. In the Play-offs, they were matched up with Sheffield Arrows for the second consecutive season and again for the second time were knocked out in the Quarter-final after losing 69–93.

Return of the London Leopards
The 2006–07 season saw another major rebranding for the franchise as the club was renamed as London Leopards in an effort to attract a bigger fanbase from Britain's capital city, whilst following a disagreement with the new owners of the club's home venue, the Brentwood Centre, the Leopards would play all home games between Wodson Park and the Goresbrook Centre. The newly renamed side underperformed in all three knockout competitions, with a 3rd round exit in the National Cup after an 85–123 defeat to London Capital, and 1st round exits in the National Trophy and the BBL Trophy, to which Leopards competed as invitees again. In Division 1, the team recorded a 4th-place finish, the club's highest ever league placing and secured home-court advantage in the Division 1 Play-offs for the first time, however they couldn't use this to their advantage, losing 70–80 to local rival London Capital in the Quarter-final.

A full-time move back to the club's original home at Wodson Park in Ware greeted the 2007–08 season and a poor showing in the Trophy started off the season with the Leopards team failing to progress from the group stage. The Leopards reached the Quarter-final in the National Cup, but were narrowly beaten by Worthing Thunder in a close 77–79 home defeat. In a condensed Division 1, the team finished with a 50% record, tallying 9 wins and 9 losses and narrowly missed out on a 4th-place finish and home court advantage in the Play-offs, after losing the last three regular season games. The Leopards lost in the Quarter-finals of the Play-off away to Bristol Flyers with a 96–105 loss.

The franchise returned to the Brentwood Centre in 2008 after a two-year absence, whilst still using Wodson Park as a secondary venue. The 2008–09 season opened with five consecutive victories in the Trophy and National Cup, however the team were eventually knocked out of the Trophy by Manchester Magic in a close 81–89 Semi-final defeat, whilst in the National Cup a narrow 72–75 loss meant a Quarter-final exit at the hands of familiar foes Reading. Leopards still fared better than previous seasons and their form was much improved in the League, finishing the season with an all-time high third place (12–6) behind Reading and Manchester. Croatian player Hrvoje Pervan's 22.1 points-per-game proved instrumental in the season's success which continued through to the Play-offs. A 74–71 win at home to Coventry Crusaders meant that for the first time in the club's history, they had won a Play-off game and advanced to the Semi-finals and the Final Four's weekend at the Amaechi Centre in Manchester. However, after being pitted against the hosts, Manchester Magic, in the Semi-finals, the occasion proved too much and Leopards fell to 92–76 defeat with Manchester's Stefan Gill posting a game-high 35 points, driving the hosts into the Final.

Leopards couldn't capitalize on their successes of the previous season and so the 2009–10 campaign saw a disappointing 9th-place finish (out of 12 teams) with a 6–16 record, meaning that the London team didn't qualify for the post-season Play-offs for the first time since the Rebels-Leopards merger. An early exit in the Trophy in a group that contained Reading and London Mets was quickly forgotten after a promising run of results in the National Cup. Victories against Milton Keynes Lions II, Hackney White Heat, London Westside and Brixton TopCats saw Leopards earn a place in the Semi-finals for only the second time in the franchise's history, but in a repeat of Leopards' Play-off Semi-final clash last season, the London side were defeated by Manchester 69–77.

In April 2010, the club announced a merger with Barking Abbey Basketball Academy, one of the country's leading basketball academy's. As a result, the senior men's Division 1 team was renamed as the BA London Leopards, whilst the women's team and the men's second team were rebranded as Barking Abbey Leopards to reflect the new partnership. Due to the new partnership, the senior team was made up mainly of Barking Abbey recruits, with American import-player Josh Sharlow brought in to add experience to the team. The new-look team enjoyed their best season yet in the League and also another encouraging run in the Trophy, after overcoming the group stage including wins over Brixton and London Capital (after the team failed to fulfil a fixture), Leopards progressed through the 1st Knockout Round with a comfortable 78–56 away win over Bristol to progress to the Semi-final. The London side were edged out narrowly though by their traditional Cup rivals Reading in a close 62–60 defeat, whilst Reading went on to win the competition, beating Leeds Carnegie in the Final. The addition of American forward Ousman Krubally, from Georgia State, in December brought extra firepower to the team and helped propel the team to second-place finish in Division 1, with a 14–4 record, beating the previous best from last season's campaign. Krubally finished the season averaging 22.1 points-per-game, the second highest in the Division. The Leopards overcame Durham Wildcats in the Play-off Quarter-finals with a 77–68 victory at the Brentwood Centre, in a game that Leopards always held the lead. Unfortunately poor free-throw shooting contributed to a disappointing Semi-final exit at the hands of Reading at the Amaechi Centre in Manchester. Reading ran out winners with a 69–80 scoreline, meaning Leopards failed to reach yet another major Final.

Following the end of season, Coach Mark Clark stepped down from his position to concentrate on his work with the Academy, with his replacement coming in the form of Slovenian Dejan Mihevc, a former Coach of various Slovenia international youth teams. Mihevc's first move as new Head Coach was to resign last season's MVP Ousman Krubally, whilst bringing-in Lithuanian Vilius Šumskis and former young star Lukas Volskis. Following the late withdrawal of Essex Pirates from the BBL, Leopards accepted an invite to compete in the BBL Trophy in their place, pitting them in a group with Leicester Riders and Milton Keynes Lions.

In November 2011 the Leopards organisation announced that they were intending to apply for a British Basketball League franchise, bidding to return to the top flight as soon as the 2012–13 season. The bid was later deferred for two seasons The 2011/12 season proved to be the most successful in the club's history as they won the EBL Division One regular season title, the play-offs and the National Cup. The Big Cats lost four of their first five league games but then reeled off 19 straight victories, winning the Division One title at Reading with two games to spare. Bristol Academy Flyers had already been beaten in a thrilling National Cup final at Ponds Forge, Sheffield, and the treble was completed as Medway Park Crusaders, Leicester Warriors and Derby Trailblazers were beaten on the way to play-off success. American point guard Vernon Teel won the MVP award in both finals and completed a hat-trick by taking the Division honour, while teammate Krubally was runner-up for the second straight season. The Leopards also began playing some home games at Basildon Sporting Village, starting with a home victory against Brixton Topcats in January 2012. Barking Abbey dissolved the agreement with Leopards in the summer of 2012, announcing that they were forming their own professional BBL Club East London Royals (though they never played a game), and Robert Youngblood – captain of the original Leopards when they won the BBL – was appointed as the club's first player-coach. Younblood's opening game in charge saw the Big Cats slip to a controversial defeat at Tees Valley Mohawks in the National Trophy pool game, but his side recovered to finish second behind the Mohawks and qualify for the knockout stages. Derby Trailblazers were hammered in the quarter-final before a fine performance from American guard Simon Cummings saw Leopards win at Hemel Storm in the semi-final. Mohawks where the opponents in the final at Leicester, and after trailing by nine at half-time, Youngblood stepped up with his biggest game of the season to take the game into overtime and Leopards then took control to win 99–91 and win the one piece of silverware that had eluded them the previous year. American big man Greg Hernandez took home the MVP award after recording 26 points and ten rebounds while Cummings had 23 points, seven rebounds and six assists. With Hernandez and former England international Taner Adu suffering early season injuries, Leopards’ defence of the Division One title never really got going, but they slowly moved up the table and a pair of victories in the north east over the final weekend of the season saw them grab and improbable fourth-place finish and home court advantage in the play-offs. Mohawks were beaten for the second successive Saturday in front of a big Brentwood Centre crowd, and the 90–75 victory sent the Big Cats into the Final Four at Manchester where champions Reading Rockets edged home 75–70 in overtime to end their season.

The Leopards completed the 2014–15 season as Division 1 Champions. The Big Cats secured the Division One title after beating the only remaining challengers Team Northumbria 84–72 in a must-win game at Brentwood Centre. The Leopards claimed their 18th win of the season to build an unassailable lead at the top of the standings with just one regular season game remaining. Robert Youngblood's side were beaten just once at home going into the title showdown and a strong finish wrapped up their first D1 Championship since the 2011–12 season.

During a turbulent 2016–17 season, the Leopards were relegated to Division 1 for the first time in 13 years. Relegation was confirmed in the penultimate game against Lancashire Spinners where a final second shot saw them go down 83–82.

== Home arenas ==
Brentwood Centre (2008–present)
Oaklands College (2019-present)

== Players ==
=== Final squad ===
Note: Flags indicate national team, as has been defined under FIBA eligibility rules. Players may hold more than one non-FIBA nationality.

No.	Pos.	Nat.	Player
4	F	(Lithuania) LTU	Osvaldas Gaizauskas
5	G	(England) ENG	Toby Gastaldi-Davies
6	G	(England) ENG	James Cummings
7	PG	(Lithuania) LTU	Marius Kaftaniukas
8	PG	(England) ENG	Aaron Williams
9	PG	(Albania) ALB	Elvisi Dusha
10	G/F	(England) ENG	Chuck Duru
11	PG	(England) ENG	Teni Mongo
12	PG	(England) ENG	Prince Larty
13	SF	(England) ENG	Orlan Jackman
14	F	(England) ENG	Ray Akpofure
15	F	(England) ENG	Simeon Douglas
41	F	(England) ENG	Ahmed Ketiri
99	F	(England) ENG	Jeremy Lievin

=== Notable former players ===
Note: Flags indicate national team eligibility at FIBA-sanctioned events. Players may hold other non-FIBA nationalities not displayed.

Criteria

To appear in this section a player must have either:

- Set a club record or won an individual award while at the club
- Played at least one official international match for their national team at any time
- Played at least one official NBA match at any time.

- (United Kingdom) Tanner Adu
- (United Kingdom) David Attewell
- (Albania) Elvisi Dusha
- (The Gambia) (United States) Ousman Krubally

== Season-by-season records ==
Season	Division	Tier	Regular Season						Post-Season	National Cup
Season	Division	Tier	Finish	Played	Wins	Losses	Points	Win %	Post-Season	National Cup
Essex & Herts Leopards
2004-05	D1	2	8th	22	9	13	18	0.409	Quarter-finals	
2005-06	D1	2	6th	26	17	9	34	0.654	Quarter-finals	
London Leopards
2006-07	D1	2	4th	22	13	9	26	0.591	Quarter-finals	
2007-08	D1	2	5th	18	9	9	18	0.500	Quarter-finals	
2008-09	D1	2	3rd	18	12	6	24	0.667	Semi-finals	
2009-10	D1	2	9th	22	6	16	12	0.273	Did not qualify	Semi-finals
BA London Leopards
2010-11	D1	2	2nd	18	14	4	28	0.778	Semi-finals	Quarter-finals
2011-12	D1	2	1st	24	20	4	40	0.833	Winners, beating Derby	Winners, beating Bristol
Essex Leopards
2012-13	D1	2	4th	26	16	10	32	0.615	Semi-finals	3rd round
2013-14	D1	2	2nd	26	20	6	40	0.769	Semi-finals	Semi-finals
2014-15	D1	2	1st	24	18	6	36	0.750	Semi-finals	3rd round
2015–16	D1	2	6th	26	16	10	32	0.615	Quarter-finals	Quarter-finals
2016–17	D1	2	13th	26	6	20	12	0.231	Did not qualify	4th round
2017–18	D2	3	4th	22	14	8	28	0.636	Semi-finals	4th round
2018–19	D1	2	7th	26	12	14	24	0.462	Quarter-finals	Semi-finals
Essex & Herts Leopards
2019–20	D1	2	11th	23	5	18	13	0.217	Did not qualify	Quarter-finals
