= Kingston Panthers =

- League: NBL D3 North
- Established: 2011; 15 years ago
- History: Kingston Panthers (2011–present)
- Location: Hull, East Riding of Yorkshire
- Website: Official website

The Kingston Panthers are an English basketball club, based in the city of Hull, East Riding of Yorkshire.

== History ==
The Panthers were founded in November 2011, competing in the local Humber Basketball League. Based at Bishop Burton College, the team was composed of local players from Hull and surrounding areas as well as players from the college. During the 2012/13 season, the Panthers merged with another local team, East Hull Harriers, allowing the club to field a reserve team, as well as taking on a robust and thriving junior setup boasting an under 13's and under 16's team. Following a second season in the local leagues, director Karl Buitendam declared his intention for the team to enter into the English Basketball League system for the 2013/14 season.

Following a successful first season in the National League, the loss of a major sponsor forced the Panthers to withdraw part way through the 2014-15 season. The club however was able to re-enter the following season.

The Panthers, as well as Senior Men's and Women's teams in the NBL, now run multiple junior, wheelchair and over 50s basketball programmes.

== Home Venue ==
The Panthers are based at the Hull Trinity House Academy in the city. They previously played home games at the Hull Arena.

== Season-by-season records ==
Season	Division	Tier	Regular Season						Post-Season	National Cup
Season	Division	Tier	Finish	Played	Wins	Losses	Points	Win %	Post-Season	National Cup
Kingston Panthers
2013–14	D4 Nor	5	3rd	14	9	5	18	0.643	Did not qualify	Did not compete
2014–15	D4 Mid	5	W/D	-	-	-	-	-	-	-
2015–16	Dev NE	5	6th	12	2	10	4	0.167	Did not qualify	Did not compete
2016–17	D4 Nor	5	6th	18	7	11	14	0.389	Did not qualify	Did not compete
2017–18	D4 Nor	5	5th	22	14	8	28	0.636	Did not qualify	Did not compete
2018–19	D4 Nor	5	4th	16	9	7	18	0.563	1st round	1st round
2019–20	D3 Nor	4								
