= 2019–20 National Basketball League (England) season =

2019-20 NBL season
- League: NBL England
- Sport: Basketball
- Teams: 86

2019-20

English Basketball League seasons
- ← 2018–19 2020–21 →

The 2019–20 season of the English Men's National Basketball League, known as the NBL, was the 48th edition of the league. Solent Kestrels were league champions for the second consecutive year.

Following the 2018–19 season, the league structure was reorganised. Division 2 was regionalised into North and South regions, while Divisions 3 and 4 were merged to form 5 regional leagues.

In March 2020, the season was cancelled due to the COVID-19 pandemic. The league season finished immediately and there were no end-of-season playoffs.

== National League Division 1 ==
=== Teams ===
Location of teams in 2019–20 NBL Division 1

Club	Formed	Last season	Location
Barking Abbey	2005	12th	London (Barking)
Bradford Dragons	2001	11th	Bradford
Derby Trailblazers	2000	5th	Derby
Essex & Herts Leopards	1997	7th	Brentwood; St Albans
Hemel Storm	2006	9th	Hemel Hempstead
Leicester Warriors	2004	8th	Leicester
Liverpool	1969	Div. 2, 1st (promoted)	Liverpool
Loughborough Riders	2010	3rd	Loughborough
Nottingham Hoods	2009	10th	Nottingham
Reading Rockets	1997	6th	Reading
Solent Kestrels	1998	1st	Southampton
Thames Valley Cavaliers	2011	4th	London (Uxbridge)
Westminster Warriors	1987	Div. 2, 2nd (promoted)	London (Kensal Green)
Worthing Thunder	1999	2nd	Worthing

Team changes

- Barking Abbey Crusaders to Barking Abbey
- Essex Leopards to Essex & Herts Leopards

Promoted from Division 2

- Liverpool
- Westminster Warriors

Relegated to Division 2

- Newcastle University
- Manchester Magic

=== Regular season ===
Pos	Team	Pld	W	L	GF	GA	GD	Pts	Qualification or relegation
1	Solent Kestrels (C)	22	22	0	2255	1575	+680	47	
2	Thames Valley Cavaliers	23	18	5	2405	2122	+283	39	
3	Derby Trailblazers	23	16	7	2112	1898	+214	35	
4	Hemel Storm	23	16	7	2249	2041	+208	35	
5	Worthing Thunder	22	15	7	2097	1928	+169	34	
6	Loughborough Riders	23	15	8	1986	1827	+159	33	
7	Reading Rockets	23	14	9	2024	1941	+83	31	
8	Bradford Dragons	23	12	11	1854	1888	−34	27	
9	Leicester Warriors	23	10	13	1977	2011	−34	23	
10	Nottingham Hoods	23	7	16	1983	2223	−240	16	
11	Essex & Herts Leopards	23	5	18	1884	2174	−290	13	
12	Barking Abbey	21	4	17	1517	1772	−255	12	
13	Westminster Warriors (R)	24	3	21	1985	2351	−366	8	Relegation to NBL D2
14	Liverpool (Note: Liverpool deducted two points for failing to fulfil fixture against Solent Kestrels due to be played on 23 November 2019.) (R)	24	3	21	1849	2383	−534	6	Relegation to NBL D2

(C) Champions; (R) Relegated
Notes:
- Following the cancellation of the season on 13 March 2020, it was decided that for games cancelled due to the early end to the season, the number of points on offer would be divided equally between the two teams involved (one point per team). This process applied to fixtures that were scheduled between 13 March (the date on which Basketball England suspended the playing season) and the end of the regular season. Games that were postponed before March 13 and had not been rearranged were voided. (zero points per team).

=== Player of the Week awards ===
Week	Player	Team	Ref	Week	Player	Team	Ref
1	(England) Cameron Hildreth	Worthing Thunder		14	(United States) Treshawn Wilford	Derby Trailblazers	
2	(United States) Ian Smith	Solent Kestrels		15	(England) Brendan Okoronkwo	Solent Kestrels	
3	(England) Lee Hodges	Hemel Storm		16	(Germany) Hakeem Sylla	Thames Valley Cavaliers	
4	(United States) Rasheed Worrell	Loughborough Riders		17	(Latvia) Rihards Sulcs	Bradford Dragons	
5	(Germany) Hakeem Sylla	Thames Valley Cavaliers		19	(Germany) Hakeem Sylla	Thames Valley Cavaliers	
6	(United States) Mike Williams	Hemel Storm		20	(United States) Taylor Johnson	Thames Valley Cavaliers	
7	(United States) Nick Richards	Reading Rockets		21	(United States) Ian Smith	Solent Kestrels	
8	(England) Elliott Sentance	Solent Kestrels		22	(Albania) Elvisi Dusha	Essex & Herts Leopards	
9	(United States) Taylor Johnson	Thames Valley Cavaliers		23	(England) Orlan Jackman	Essex & Herts Leopards	
10	(United States) Travis Charles	Solent Kestrels					
11	(England) Elliott Sentance	Solent Kestrels					
12	(United States) Martelle McLemore	Thames Valley Cavaliers					
13	(United States) Travis Charles	Solent Kestrels					

=== Statistics ===
Minimum 10 games

Scoring

As of 16 May 2020

Rank	Player	Club	PPG
1	(United States) TJ Henderson	Leicester Warriors	27.2
2	(United States) Taylor Johnson	Thames Valley Cavaliers	26.0
3	(United States) Mike Williams	Hemel Storm	23.3
4	(United States) Nick Richards	Reading Rockets	22.2
5	(United States) Travis Charles	Solent Kestrels	22.1

Rebounding

As of 16 May 2020

Rank	Player	Club	RPG
1	(Germany) Hakeem Sylla	Thames Valley Cavaliers	13.7
2	(United States) Greg Poleon	Hemel Storm	10.8
3	(United States) Ricky Fetske	Bradford Dragons	9.8
4	(United States) Travis Charles	Solent Kestrels	9.7
5	(England) Oliver Stanley	Derby Trailblazers	8.5

Assists

As of 16 May 2020

Rank	Player	Club	APG
1	(United States) Ian Smith	Solent Kestrels	6.4
2	(England) Alex Roberts	Loughborough Riders	6.1
3	(England) Elliot Dadds	Solent Kestrels	5.9
4	(England) Charlie Brown	Derby Trailblazers	5.8
5	(England) Bode Adeluola	Hemel Storm	5.8

== National League Division 2 ==
=== Regular season ===
North
Pos	Team	Pld	W	L	GF	GA	GD	Pts
1	Team Newcastle Knights (C)	18	16	2	1488	1201	+287	34
2	Myerscough College	17	14	3	1330	1108	+222	31
3	Charnwood College	17	12	5	1465	1278	+187	27
4	Derbyshire Arrows	18	10	8	1561	1536	+25	22
5	Manchester Magic	18	10	8	1357	1288	+69	22
6	Birmingham Elite	18	8	10	1317	1304	+13	18
7	Chester University	18	8	10	1358	1346	+12	18
8	Bristol Flyers II	18	7	11	1378	1422	−44	16
9	Derbyshire Spartans	17	6	11	1406	1531	−125	15
10	Bristol Hurricanes	17	6	11	1208	1249	−41	15
11	Sheffield Hallam University (R)	18	0	18	951	1556	−605	2

(C) Champions; (R) Relegated

South
Pos	Team	Pld	W	L	GF	GA	GD	Pts
1	Essex Rebels (C)	17	15	2	1520	1312	+208	31
2	London Westside	16	11	5	1317	1244	+73	24
3	London BC Medelynas	17	11	6	1421	1271	+150	23
4	Ipswich	17	10	7	1467	1445	+22	21
5	East London All-Stars	14	7	7	1155	1090	+65	18
6	London Greenhouse Pioneers	16	8	8	1322	1321	+1	18
7	Solent Kestrels II	15	6	9	1166	1201	−35	14
8	Greenwich Titans	17	6	11	1394	1425	−31	13
9	Sussex Bears	17	4	13	1308	1408	−100	9
10	Cardiff Met Archers	18	4	14	1359	1712	−353	8

(C) Champions

== National League Division 3 ==
=== Regular season ===
North
Pos	Team	Pld	W	L	Pts
1	Lancashire Spinners (C)	22	19	3	38
2	Newcastle Eagles U23	21	16	5	33
3	Tees Valley Mohawks	21	15	6	31
4	Calderdale Explorers	21	15	6	31
5	Myerscough College II	20	14	6	29
6	Teesside Lions	19	9	10	20
7	Team Sunderland	21	9	12	19
8	Stockport Falcons	21	9	12	19
9	Barrow Thorns	20	7	13	16
10	Tameside	21	7	14	15
11	Liverpool II	21	4	17	9
12	Cheshire Wire	20	0	20	2

(C) Champions

Midlands
Pos	Team	Pld	W	L	Pts
1	Doncaster Eagles (C)	21	20	1	41
2	City of Birmingham Rockets	21	17	4	35
3	Birmingham Mets	21	12	9	25
4	Derby Trailblazers II	21	12	9	25
5	Wolverhampton University	20	11	9	24
6	Coventry Flames	21	10	11	21
7	Warwickshire Hawks	21	9	12	19
8	Sheffield Sabres	21	9	12	19
9	Stourport Spartans	20	8	12	18
10	Stoke-on-Trent Knights	21	8	13	17
11	Mansfield Giants	21	5	16	11
12	Derbyshire Arrows II	21	4	17	9

(C) Champions

East
Pos	Team	Pld	W	L	Pts
1	Northamptonshire Titans (C)	13	13	0	27
2	Anglia Ruskin University	13	9	4	19
3	Nottingham Trent University	13	8	5	17
4	Essex Rebels II	12	7	5	16
5	Nottingham University	13	5	8	11
6	County Upper Wolves	13	5	8	11
7	Hemel Storm II	14	4	10	8
8	Bury St. Edmunds Bulldogs	13	1	12	3

(C) Champions

South East
Pos	Team	Pld	W	L	Pts
1	Richmond Knights (C)	14	11	3	24
2	London Thunder	15	11	4	23
3	Southwark Pride	14	9	5	20
4	Chelmsford Lions	15	9	6	19
5	Barking Abbey II	14	8	6	18
6	Surrey Rams	15	7	8	15
7	Canterbury Crusaders	16	5	11	10
8	Barking & Havering RDF	15	2	13	5
9	London Warriors	14	1	13	4

(C) Champions

South West
Pos	Team	Pld	W	L	Pts
1	Oxford Brookes University (C)	18	15	3	30
2	RCT Gladiators	17	14	3	29
3	Cardiff City	16	12	4	26
4	Huish Taunton Tigers	17	11	6	23
5	Dorset Storm	17	8	9	17
6	Gloucester Saxons	17	6	11	13
7	Bognor GSD	17	5	12	11
8	Swindon Shock	18	5	13	10
9	Cardiff Met Archers II	17	4	13	9
10	Oxford Stealers	16	2	14	6

(C) Champions

== National Cup ==
=== First round ===
28 Sep 2019

Dorset Storm	80–87	Chelmsford Lions

29 Sep 2019

City of Birmingham Rockets	62–64	Wolverhampton University

29 Sep 2019

Warwickshire Hawks	73–82	Northamptonshire Titans

29 Sep 2019

Richmond Knights	59–75	Lewisham Thunder

29 Sep 2019

Cardiff Met Archers II	56–100	Surrey Rams

29 Sep 2019

Barking & Havering	56–74	Barking Abbey II

29 Sep 2019

Taunton Tigers	87–69	Swindon Shock

=== Second round ===
6 Oct 2019

Southwark Pride	81–84	Ipswich Tomcats

12 Oct 2019

Derbyshire Arrows	59–56	Wolverhampton University

13 Oct 2019

Sussex Bears	80–67	Bristol Flyers II

13 Oct 2019

Bristol Hurricanes	100–91	Cardiff Met Archers

13 Oct 2019

Bury St. Edmunds Bulldogs	63–82	Derbyshire Spartans

13 Oct 2019

Newcastle Eagles U23	50–73	Manchester Magic

13 Oct 2019

Newcastle University	87–80	Northamptonshire Titans

13 Oct 2019

Essex Rebels	85–64	Canterbury Crusaders

13 Oct 2019

Lewisham Thunder	80–85	London BC Medelynas

13 Oct 2019

Greenwich Titans	69–74	Surrey Rams

13 Oct 2019

Chelmsford Lions	61–89	London Westside

20 Oct 2019

Barking Abbey II	69–101	East London All-Stars

=== Third round ===
3 Nov 2019

Sussex Bears	86–72	Bristol Hurricanes

3 Nov 2019

Surrey Rams	37–120	Solent Kestrels

3 Nov 2019

Barking Abbey	77–87	East London All-Stars

3 Nov 2019

Liverpool	85–55	Derbyshire Spartans

3 Nov 2019

Essex & Herts Leopards	108–74	London Greenhouse Pioneers

3 Nov 2019

Essex Rebels	93–91	Thames Valley Cavaliers

3 Nov 2019

Derby Trailblazers	104–56	Sheffield Hallam University

3 Nov 2019

Birmingham Elite	52–101	Reading Rockets

3 Nov 2019

Leicester Warriors	89–63	Chester University

3 Nov 2019

Worthing Thunder	83–77	Ipswich Tomcats

3 Nov 2019

Nottingham Hoods	101–91	Derbyshire Arrows

3 Nov 2019

London BC Medelynas	68–99	Hemel Storm

3 Nov 2019

Manchester Magic	79–80	Myerscough College

10 Nov 2019

Bradford Dragons	97–88	Newcastle University

17 Nov 2019

London Westside	92–97	Westminster Warriors

=== Fourth round ===
24 Nov 2019

Sussex Bears	78–88	Essex & Herts Leopards

24 Nov 2019

Bradford Dragons	77–87	Solent Kestrels

24 Nov 2019

Leicester Warriors	89–92	Hemel Storm

24 Nov 2019

Essex Rebels	80–82	Loughborough Riders

24 Nov 2019

Nottingham Hoods	77–78	Reading Rockets

28 Nov 2019

Myerscough College	101–67	Liverpool

1 Dec 2019

East London All-Stars	74–83	Westminster Warriors

7 Dec 2019

Derby Trailblazers	94–72	Worthing Thunder

=== Quarter-finals ===
15 Dec 2019

Hemel Storm	87–97	Solent Kestrels

15 Dec 2019

Loughborough Riders	83–77	Derby Trailblazers

15 Dec 2019

Essex & Herts Leopards	82–98	Reading Rockets

12 Jan 2020

Myerscough College	71–62	Westminster Warriors

=== Semi-finals ===
The draw for the semi-finals took place on 18 December 2019.

19 Jan 2020

Loughborough Riders	70–86	Solent Kestrels

19 Jan 2020

Reading Rockets	77–58	Myerscough College

=== Final ===
2 Feb 2020
15:30

Solent Kestrels	90–67	Reading Rockets
Scoring by quarter: 28-15, 21-15, 16-19, 25-18
Pts: Travis Charles (21); Rebs: Elliott Sentance (10); Asts: Ian Smith, Brendan Okoronkwo (5)		Pts: Nicholas Richards (22); Rebs: Ed Potter (13); Asts: Nicholas Richards (5)

Essex Arena
