= Mansfield Giants =

- League: NBL D3 Midlands
- Established: 1990; 36 years ago
- History: Mansfield Giants; 1990-present
- Arena: Oak Tree Leisure Centre
- Capacity: 300
- Location: Mansfield, Nottinghamshire
- Website: Official Facebook Page

The Mansfield Giants are a basketball club from Mansfield, Nottinghamshire, England. The club was originally formed in 1990, and home games are played at the Oak Tree Leisure Centre.

The Giants debuted in the English Basketball League in the 2006/07 season, with the Men's team entering the newly formed Division 4 (North), starting with a 10–4 record in their first year, which was enough to earn them a quick promotion to Division 3. Two years later, the Giants' Men's team repeated their success, taking second place in the D3 North bracket with a 17–5 win–loss record to earn promotion to Division 2. By comparison, the Women's team entered directly into Division 2 (North) on their debut in 2006, with their second place in the 2008–09 season the highlight so far.

== Season-by-season records ==
Season	Division	Tier	Regular Season						Post-Season	National Cup
Season	Division	Tier	Finish	Played	Wins	Losses	Points	Win %	Post-Season	National Cup
Mansfield Giants
2006–07	D4 Mid	5	2nd	14	10	4	20	0.714		
2007–08	D3 Nor	4								
2008–09	D3 Nor	4	2nd	22	17	5	34	0.773		
2009–10	D2	3	3rd	20	14	6	28	0.700	Semi-finals	
2010–11	D2	3	9th	20	6	14	12	0.300	Did not qualify	
2011–12	D2	3	9th	20	6	14	12	0.300	Did not qualify	3rd round
2012–13	D2	3	8th	22	8	14	16	0.364	Quarter-finals	Quarter-finals
2013–14	D2	3	11th	20	1	19	2	0.050	Did not qualify	2nd round
2014–15	D3 Nor	4								Did not compete
2015–16	D3 Nor	4	8th	20	7	13	14	0.350	Did not qualify	Did not compete
2016–17	D3 Nor	4	10th	20	2	18	4	0.100	Did not qualify	Did not compete
2017–18	D4 Mid	5	11th	22	4	18	8	0.182	Did not qualify	Did not compete
2018–19	D4 Mid	5	7th	16	5	11	10	0.313	Did not qualify	Did not compete
2019–20	D3 Mid	4	11th	21	5	16	11	0.238	Did not qualify	Did not compete
