= Doncaster Danum Eagles =

Doncaster Eagles
- League: NBL Division 2 North
- Established: 2000; 26 years ago
- History: Danum Eagles; 2000-2019; Doncaster Eagles; 2019-present
- Arena: New College Doncaster (Auckley, Doncaster)
- Location: Doncaster, England
- Website: Official Facebook Page

The Doncaster Eagles are an English basketball club, based in the city of Doncaster, South Yorkshire. The team plays in the North conference of the 2nd Division in the National Basketball League (NBL), the third tier of British Basketball.

== History ==
The Eagles joined the English Basketball League in 2014, and rapidly ascended through the Divisions 3 and 4, achieving back-to-back promotions. However, upon reaching Division 2, the club were forced to move their home games 25 miles away to Scunthorpe due to the unsuitably of their home venue to host Division 2 games. The team struggled with the move, losing the positive momentum built up over the last couple of years, finishing 11th in their inaugural Division 2 season and facing relegation back to Division 3.

The Eagles took the decision to withdraw during 2017–18 season due to financial constraints, re-entering the NBL in Division 4 for the 2018–19 season.

As of the 2021–22 season, the Eagles have competed in the NBL Division 2's North conference, finishing third-place at the end of the season, with the Eagles' own Robert Marsden being awarded 'Player of the Year' in Division 2 North.

The team continues to compete in the 2nd Division going into the 2022–23 season.

== Players ==
Former Eagles players Matthew Martin and Oliver Hylands have both played in the top-tier British Basketball League in recent years, for Sheffield and Leeds respectively.

== Season-by-season records ==
| Season | Division | Tier | Regular Season | | | | | | Post-Season | National Cup |
| Season | Division | Tier | Finish | Played | Wins | Losses | Points | Win % | Post-Season | National Cup |
|---|---|---|---|---|---|---|---|---|---|---|
Doncaster Danum Eagles
| 2014–15 | D4 Nor | 5 | 1st | 16 | 15 | 1 | 30 | 0.938 | Semi-finals | Did not compete |
| 2015–16 | D3 Nor | 4 | 2nd | 20 | 16 | 4 | 32 | 0.800 | Semi-finals | 1st round |
| 2016–17 | D2 | 3 | 11th | 22 | 6 | 16 | 12 | 0.273 | Did not qualify | 2nd round |
| 2017–18 | Withdrew from league | | | | | | | | | |
| 2018–19 | D4 Nor | 5 | 2nd | 16 | 14 | 2 | 28 | 0.875 | Semi-finals | Did not compete |
Doncaster Eagles
| 2019–20 | D3 Mid | 4 | 1st | 21 | 20 | 1 | 41 | 0.952 | No playoffs | Did not compete |
| 2020-21 | D2 Nor | 3 | Season cancelled due to COVID-19 pandemic | | | | | | | |
| 2021–22 | D2 Nor | 3 | 3rd | 22 | 15 | 7 | 30 | 0.682 | Semi-finals | 4th round |
| 2022–23 | D2 Nor | 3 | 8th | 22 | 8 | 14 | 16 | 0.364 | Did not qualify | 2nd round |
| 2023–24 | D2 Nor | 3 | 12th | 22 | 3 | 19 | 6 | 0.136 | Did Not Qualify | |
