= Tosin Oyelese =

English basketball player

Tosin Oyelese (born 14 May 1991) is an English professional basketball player who started his career playing for the Essex Leopards of the English Basketball League. From 2017 to 2020 he was a forward in Westminster Warriors.
