= London Thunder Lewisham B.C. =

English basketball club

London Thunder
- League: NBL D3 South East
- Established: 2007; 19 years ago
- History: Lewisham Thunder; 2007-2015; London Thunder; 2015–present
- Arena: The Thunderdome
- Location: Lewisham, England
- Head coach: Steve Bucknall
- Website: Official website

The London Thunder are an English basketball club, based in the borough of Lewisham, London, England.

== History ==
The club was established in September 2007. The club has developed from a community session with 12 youngsters to a registered charity engaging with over 200 registered players and 1000+ young people every year. The club is led by Steve Bucknall, the first Englishman to play in the NBA.

In 2018, the club were visited by Golden State Warriors guard Steph Curry, running a skills session with a number of junior players.

The Thunder entered the Men's English Basketball League in 2015. The club won the Division 4 Playoff final in 2019.

== Players ==
Former Thunder player Kavell Bigby-Williams signed a one-year contract with the Charlotte Hornets of the NBA in July 2019. He currently plays for the Erie BayHawks in the NBA G League.

Former Thunder player Rowell Graham-Bell currently plays for CB Almansa in Spain's LEB Oro.

Josh Uduje Josh Uduje who initially attended Coastal Carolina has now committed to Utah State for his final 2 years

== Home venue ==
In December 2012 the club were approached by the Surrey Canal Sports Foundation, the charitable body overseeing the sports and leisure aspect of the New Bermondsey Regeneration project. The club were offered the opportunity to take on a tenancy of a converted warehouse situated within the development location. This opportunity was on the premise that the new development (to include a 3,000-seat arena with show court) will become the eventual permanent home of the club. The Thunderdome, officially launched in July 2014, means that the Thunder are therefore one of the few clubs in the country to manage their own dedicated basketball facility.

== Academy ==
Thunder, have in previous years been involved in the academy programme and in partnership with King Henry School, have run an under-19 team in the Academies Basketball League, the second tier under 19s basketball competition in the United Kingdom.

== Season-by-season records ==
Season	Division	Tier	Regular Season						Post-Season	National Cup
Season	Division	Tier	Finish	Played	Wins	Losses	Points	Win %	Post-Season	National Cup
London Thunder
2015–16	Dev SE	5	5th	18	9	9	18	0.500	Did not qualify	1st round
2016–17	D4 SE	5	4th	18	12	6	24	0.667	1st round	1st round
2017–18	D4 SE	5	7th	18	7	11	14	0.389	Did not qualify	3rd round
2018–19	D4 SE	5	2nd	18	12	6	24	0.667	Winners	1st round
2019–20	D3 SE	4	2nd	15	11	4	23	0.733	No playoffs	2nd round
