= 2018–19 National Basketball League (England) season =

2018–19 NBL season
- League: National Basketball League
- Teams: 82

2018–19

English Basketball League seasons
- ← 2017–18 2019–20 →

The 2018–19 season was the 47th edition of the National Basketball League of England. Solent Kestrels won their 1st league title.

== Division 1 ==
=== Teams ===
Location of teams in 2018–19 NBL Division 1

Team changes

- Loughborough University to Loughborough Riders
- Kent Crusaders to Barking Abbey Crusaders

Promoted from Division 2

- Thames Valley Cavaliers
- Nottingham Hoods
- Essex Leopards

Folded

- Northumbria University
- Lancashire Spinners

=== Regular season ===
Pos	Team	Pld	W	L	GF	GA	GD	Pts	
1	Solent Kestrels (C)	26	22	4	2273	1769	+504	44	League Champions
2	Worthing Thunder	26	22	4	2417	2098	+319	44	Qualification to playoffs
3	Loughborough Riders	26	19	7	2199	1986	+213	38	Qualification to playoffs
4	Thames Valley Cavaliers	26	16	10	2185	2103	+82	32	Qualification to playoffs
5	Derby Trailblazers	26	15	11	2214	2157	+57	30	Qualification to playoffs
6	Reading Rockets	26	14	12	2276	2205	+71	28	Qualification to playoffs
7	Essex Leopards	26	12	14	2224	2295	−71	24	Qualification to playoffs
8	Leicester Warriors	26	12	14	2071	2239	−168	24	Qualification to playoffs
9	Hemel Storm	26	11	15	2343	2374	−31	22	
10	Nottingham Hoods	26	11	15	2033	2103	−70	22	
11	Bradford Dragons	26	11	15	2163	2273	−110	22	
12	Barking Abbey Crusaders	26	8	18	1894	2096	−202	16	
13	Newcastle University (R)	26	7	19	1932	2077	−145	14	Relegated to NBL2
14	Manchester Magic (R)	26	2	24	1847	2296	−449	4	Relegated to NBL2

(C) Champions; (R) Relegated

=== Playoffs ===
Quarter-finals

6 Apr 2019

Solent Kestrels	100–71	Leicester Warriors

6 Apr 2019

Worthing Thunder	107–85	Essex Leopards

6 Apr 2019

Loughborough Riders	83–63	Reading Rockets

6 Apr 2019

Thames Valley Cavaliers	90–81	Derby Trailblazers

Semi-finals

13 Apr 2019

Solent Kestrels	104–64	Thames Valley Cavaliers

13 Apr 2019

Worthing Thunder	86–72	Loughborough Riders

Final

28 Apr 2019

Solent Kestrels	100–81	Worthing Thunder
Scoring by quarter: 25-21, 24-22, 20-19, 31-19
Pts: Travis Charles (25); Rebs: Tayo Oyefusi (13); Asts: Herm Senor (12)		Pts: Zaire Taylor, Jorge Ebanks (20); Rebs: Zaire Taylor (10); Asts: Jorge Ebanks (10)

National Basketball Performance Centre, Manchester
Attendance: 700

== Division 2 ==
=== Teams ===
Location of teams in 2018–19 NBL Division 2

Team changes

- Middlesex LTBC to London United

Promoted from Division 3

- Myerscough College
- East London All-Stars

Relegated from Division 2

- Birmingham Elite

=== Regular season ===
Pos	Team	Pld	W	L	GF	GA	GD	Pts	
1	Liverpool (C, P)	20	20	0	1862	1498	+364	40	Promoted to Division 1
2	Westminster Warriors (P)	20	14	6	1655	1466	+189	28	Promoted to Division 1
3	London United	20	11	9	1657	1594	+63	22	Qualification to playoffs
4	Sussex Bears	20	11	9	1521	1477	+44	22	Qualification to playoffs
5	Myerscough College	20	10	10	1527	1533	−6	20	Qualification to playoffs
6	London Greenhouse Pioneers	20	10	10	1490	1475	+15	20	Qualification to playoffs
7	East London All-Stars	20	9	11	1564	1553	+11	18	Qualification to playoffs
8	London Westside	20	7	13	1431	1558	−127	14	Qualification to playoffs
9	Derbyshire Arrows	20	6	14	1515	1720	−205	12	
10	Greenwich Titans	20	6	14	1609	1721	−112	12	
11	Ipswich	20	5	15	1556	1792	−236	10	

(C) Champions; (P) Promoted

=== Playoffs ===
Quarter-finals

6 Apr 2019

Liverpool	103–72	London Westside

6 Apr 2019

Westminster Warriors	89–74	East London All-Stars

6 Apr 2019

London United	95–60	London Greenhouse Pioneers

6 Apr 2019

Sussex Bears	50–77	Myerscough College

Semi-finals

13 Apr 2019

Liverpool	80–63	Myerscough College

13 Apr 2019

Westminster Warriors	77–75	London United

Final

27 Apr 2019

Liverpool	82–74	Westminster Warriors
Scoring by quarter: 24-26, 26-15, 14-20, 18-13
Pts: Mark Rangeley (23); Rebs: Jack Hudson, Kehinde Ogunneye (8); Asts: Jack Hudson (8)		Pts: Jon Johnson (21); Rebs: Johnathan Lashley (11); Asts: Florian Damptey (6)

National Basketball Performance Centre, Manchester
Attendance: 200

== Division 3 ==
=== Regular season ===
North Division

Pos	Team	Pld	W	L	GF	GA	GD	Pts
1	Chester University (C)	22	19	3	1812	1540	+272	38
2	Team Derby Spartans	22	17	5	2088	1744	+344	34
3	Derby Trailblazers II	22	16	6	1868	1767	+101	32
4	Birmingham Elite	22	13	9	1763	1630	+133	26
5	Sheffield Hallam Sharks	22	12	10	1757	1792	−35	24
6	Charnwood College Riders	22	12	10	1814	1764	+50	24
7	Birmingham Mets	22	10	12	1750	1807	−57	20
8	Stoke-on-Trent Knights	22	8	14	1782	1813	−31	16
9	Sheffield Sabres	22	8	14	1670	1748	−78	16
10	WLV Albion	22	8	14	1353	1545	−192	16
11	Sunderland University	22	7	15	1448	1614	−166	14
12	Calderdale Explorers	22	2	20	1523	1864	−341	4

Source: https://www.basketballengland.co.uk/fixtures-and-results/national-league-tables
(C) Champions

South Division

Pos	Team	Pld	W	L	GF	GA	GD	Pts
1	London BC Medelynas (C)	16	14	2	1458	1083	+375	28
2	Solent Kestrels II	16	12	4	1290	1096	+194	24
3	Bristol Flyers II	16	12	4	1353	1234	+119	24
4	Essex University	16	10	6	1358	1325	+33	20
5	Swindon Shock	16	9	7	1515	1430	+85	18
6	Cardiff Metropolitan University	16	7	9	1225	1218	+7	14
7	Cardiff City	16	4	12	1196	1501	−305	8
8	Barking Abbey II	16	3	13	1076	1234	−158	6
9	Oxford Brookes University	16	1	15	1098	1518	−420	2

Source: https://www.basketballengland.co.uk/fixtures-and-results/national-league-tables
(C) Champions

=== Playoffs ===
Final

27 April 2019

Solent Kestrels II	66–80	London BC Medelynas
Scoring by quarter: 12-20, 18-16, 10-25, 26-19
Pts: Ben Maranan (18); Rebs: Alex Grant (14); Asts: Bikram Rana (3)		Pts: Algirdas Jaras (18); Rebs: Algirdas Jaras (11); Asts: Donatas Juodeikis (6)

National Basketball Performance Centre, Manchester
Attendance: 200

== Division 4 ==
=== Regular season ===
North

Team	Pld	W	L
1. Newcastle Eagles U23	16	14	2
2. Doncaster Danum E.	16	14	2
3. Liverpool Stars	16	9	7
4. Kingston Panthers	16	9	7
5. Myerscough College II	16	8	8
6. Tameside	16	7	9
7. Stockport Falcons	16	5	11
8. Barrow Thorns	16	5	11
9. Cheshire Wire	16	1	15

Midlands

Team	Pld	W	L
1. Nottingham University	16	13	3
2. Northants Thunder	16	12	4
3. Warwickshire Hawks	16	11	5
4. Trent University	16	9	7
5. Birmingham Rockets	16	8	8
6. Coventry Flames	16	8	8
7. Mansfield Giants	16	5	11
8. Charnwood College II	16	4	12
9. Birmingham Mets II	16	2	14

South East

Team	Pld	W	L
1. Chelmsford Lions	18	15	3
2. Lewisham Thunder	18	12	6
3. Richmond Knights	18	12	6
4. Canterbury Academy	18	12	6
5. Southwark Pride	18	10	8
6. Anglia Ruskin Univ.	18	9	9
7. Hemel Storm II	18	8	10
8. London United II	18	8	10
9. Canterbury CC Saints	18	3	15
10. Westminster Dragons	18	1	17

South West

Team	Pld	W	L
1. Bristol Hurricanes	14	14	0
2. Huish Taunton Tigers	14	9	5
3. RCT Gladiators	14	9	5
4. Dorset Storm	14	9	5
5. Surrey Rams	14	8	6
6. Oxford Stealers	14	4	10
7. Cardiff Met Univ. II	14	3	11
8. Gloucester Saxons	14	0	14

=== Playoffs ===
Final

27 April 2019

Bristol Hurricanes	71–88	Lewisham Thunder
Scoring by quarter: 18-22, 15-24, 15-16, 23-26
Pts: Zymantas Armonas (17); Rebs: Benas Andriekus (9); Asts: Benas Andriekus (9)		Pts: Josh Uduje (24); Rebs: Alberto Ortiz (10); Asts: Alberto Ortiz (6)

National Basketball Performance Centre, Manchester
Attendance: 100
