= Derbyshire Spartans =

- League: NBL D2 North
- Established: 2012; 14 years ago
- History: Ripley Ravens (2012-2015); Amber Valley Spartans (2015-2017); Derbyshire Spartans (2017-present)
- Arena: Repton School
- Capacity: 250
- Location: Ripley, Derbyshire, England
- Website: Official website

The Derbyshire Spartans are an English basketball club, based in the town of Ripley, South Derbyshire.

== Home venue ==
The Spartans play their home National League games at the Repton School in nearby Repton. The arena has capacity for 250 spectators.

== Season-by-season records ==
| Season | Division | Tier | Regular Season | | | | | | Post-Season | National Cup |
| Season | Division | Tier | Finish | Played | Wins | Losses | Points | Win % | Post-Season | National Cup |
|---|---|---|---|---|---|---|---|---|---|---|
Team Derby
| 2017–18 | D4 Mid | 5 | 1st | 22 | 19 | 3 | 38 | 0.863 | Winners | 2nd round |
Team Derby Spartans
| 2018–19 | D3 Nor | 4 | 2nd | 22 | 17 | 5 | 34 | 0.773 | Semi-finals | 2nd round |
Derbyshire Spartans
| 2019–20 | D2 Nor | 3 | 9th | 17 | 6 | 11 | 15 | 0.353 | Did not qualify | 3rd round |
