= Birmingham Elite B.C. =

- League: NBL D2 North
- Established: 2004; 21 years ago
- History: Aston Athletics; 2004-2006; Birmingham Athletics; 2006-2007; Birmingham A's; 2007-2015; Birmingham Elite; 2015-present
- Arena: The Factory YPC
- Location: Birmingham, West Midlands
- Team colours
- Head coach: Steven Hansell
- Website: Official website

Team Birmingham Elite are an English basketball club, based in the Longbridge area of the city of Birmingham.

== History ==
The club was founded in 2004, as the Aston Athletics, to play at the Aston Events Centre, which had just been vacated by British Basketball League side Birmingham Bullets. Starting out in English Basketball League Division 3 North, the Athletics enjoyed excellent rookie season which saw them lift the Men's National Shield and finish second in the league, but only on countback in games against winners Plymouth Raiders II. They also reached the semi-finals of the EBL3 Play-offs.

The team relocated, from Aston Events Centre to Birmingham Sports Centre in 2006, and, following the dissolution of the Bullets, the club changed its name to Birmingham Athletics to reflect its status as the only National League team representing the city at the time. They subsequently stated their desire to turn professional by becoming the second EBL team (after Coventry Crusaders) to apply for membership of the proposed British Basketball Association (BBA), a league devised to compete with the incumbent British Basketball League as the premier basketball competition in the country, in its inaugural season in 2007–08. However, the BBA never materialized; and this, combined with the BBL and members of the defunct Birmingham Bullets team creating a new Birmingham franchise, the Birmingham Panthers, ultimately prevented Athletics from realizing their professional ambitions.

Elite are now primarily a development-focused club; with teams from under 14s to senior, the first team had been based around under-19 players from Elite Academies Basketball League side Bournville College. As of 2019, the academy is now based at James Watt College in the city. The development pathway is completed with a link between the club and Birmingham City University, who compete in the British Universities and Colleges Sport League. The first team and academy is currently coached by Birmingham born, former Euroleague player Steven Hansell.

== Teams ==
As of the 2019–20 season, Elite field teams in the following National League divisions:

- Senior Men
- Senior Women
- U18 Men
- U18 Women
- U16 Boys
- U14 Boys

== Honours ==
U18 Men's National Cup: (1) 2013–2014

== Notable former players ==
Note: Flags indicate national team eligibility at FIBA-sanctioned events. Players may hold other non-FIBA nationalities not displayed.

Criteria

To appear in this section a player must have either:

- Set a club record or won an individual award while at the club
- Played at least one official international match for their national team at any time
- Played at least one official NBA match at any time.

- (United Kingdom) Myles Hesson

== Home Venue ==
Elite are based at The Factory Young People's Centre in the Longbridge area of the city.

== Men's season-by-season records ==
Season	Division	Tier	Regular Season						Post-Season	National Cup
Season	Division	Tier	Finish	Played	Wins	Losses	Points	Win %	Post-Season	National Cup
Aston Athletics
2005-06	D2	3	7th	22	10	12	20	0.455		
Birmingham Athletics
2006-07	D2	3	7th	22	11	11	22	0.500		
2007-08	D2	3	3rd	22	15	7	30	0.682		
Birmingham A's
2008-09	D2	3	4th	22	14	8	28	0.636		
2009-10	D2	3	9th	20	8	12	16	0.400	Did not qualify	3rd round
2010-11	D2	3	11th	20	1	19	2	0.050	Did not qualify	Did not compete
2011-12	D2	3	11th	20	2	18	4	0.100	Did not qualify	Did not compete
2012-13	D3 Nor	4	9th	22	11	11	14*	0.500	Did not qualify	2nd round
2013-14	D3 Nor	4	7th	20	7	13	14	0.350	Did not qualify	1st round
Team Birmingham Elite
2015–16	D3 Nor	4	5th	20	12	8	24	0.600	Did not qualify	Did not compete
2016–17	D3 Nor	4	1st	20	17	3	34	0.850	Runners Up	4th round
2017–18	D2	3	12th	22	6	16	12	0.273	Did not qualify	3rd round
2018–19	D3 Nor	4	4th	22	13	9	26	0.591	Quarter-finals	4th round
2019–20	D2 Nor	3	6th	18	8	10	18	0.444	Did not qualify	3rd round
