= Ipswich B.C. =

- League: Men: NBL D2 South; Women: NBL D1
- Established: 1976; 50 years ago
- History: Ipswich B.C. (1976–present)
- Arena: Copleston High School
- Capacity: 200
- Location: Ipswich, Suffolk
- Team colours
- Main sponsor: Turners Motor Group
- Website: Official website

Ipswich Basketball Club are an English basketball club, based in the town of Ipswich, Suffolk, England.

== Women's team ==
=== Honours ===
Women's National Cup Champions: 2017-18
Women's National League Division 2 North League Champions: 2017-18
Women's National League Division 2 Playoff Champions: 2017-18

=== Season-by-season records ===
Season	Division	Tier	Regular Season					Post-Season	National Cup
Season	Division	Tier	Finish	Played	Wins	Losses	Win %	Post-Season	National Cup
Ipswich
2017–18	D2 Nor	3	1st	15	15	0	1.000	Winners	Winners
2018–19	D1	2	6th	18	9	9	0.500	Quarter-finals	Quarter-finals
2019–20	D1	2							

== Men's team ==
=== Season-by-season records ===
Season	Division	Tier	Regular Season					Post-Season	National Cup
Season	Division	Tier	Finish	Played	Wins	Losses	Win %	Post-Season	National Cup
Ipswich
2011–12	D4 Mid	5	2nd	22	20	2	0.909	Semi-finals	1st round
2012–13	D3 Sou	4	2nd	18	14	4	0.778	Semi-finals	1st round
2013–14	D2	3	3rd	20	14	6	0.700	Runners Up	3rd round
2014–15	D2	3	3rd	22	15	7	0.682	Semi-finals	2nd round
2015–16	D2	3	5th	22	13	9	0.591	Quarter-finals	2nd round
2016–17	D2	3	4th	22	12	10	0.545	Semi-finals	Did not compete
2017–18	D2	3	9th	22	7	15	0.318	Did not qualify	3rd round
2018–19	D2	3	11th	20	5	15	0.250	Did not qualify	3rd round
2019–20	D2 Sou	3	4th	17	10	7	0.588	No playoffs	
2020–21	D2 Sou	3	No season due to COVID-19 pandemic						
2021–22	D2 Sou	3	9th	22	8	14	0.364	Did not qualify	
2022–23	D2 Sou	3	3rd	22	15	7	0.682	Quarter-finals	
2023–24	D2 Sou	3	10th	22	7	15	0.318	Did not qualify	

== Academy ==
In partnership with Copleston High School, Ipswich run elite men's and women's under 19 academies, which compete in the Elite Academies Basketball League (EABL) and Women's Elite Academies Basketball League (WEABL) respectively. Both leagues are the top-tier leagues for under 19's basketball in the United Kingdom. Many players have graduated from the academies to further their education and basketball development in the NCAA system in the United States.
