= Sussex Bears =

Brighton Bears
- League: NBL D2 South
- Established: 2014; 12 years ago
- History: Sussex Bears (2014–2022); Brighton Bears (2022-present)
- Arena: Sir Robert Woodard Academy
- Capacity: 700
- Location: Lancing, West Sussex
- Team colours
- Website: Official website

The Brighton Bears are an English basketball club, based in the town of Lancing, West Sussex.

== History ==
The Bears were formed in 2014. Former Worthing Thunder coach and local basketball legend Gary Smith was brought in to lead the club as chairman and first team coach, and with him he brought a number of former Thunder players to form the nucleus of the new team.

The Bears' name is not a new one to basketball in the area - the Brighton Bears played in the top-flight BBL for many years until their final season in 2006.

The 'new' club has since developed rapidly, increasing the number of men's, women's and youth teams representing under the Bears' name. The Bears have also risen through the divisions of the English Basketball League, reaching their current position in Division 2 in 2017.

The Bears announced plans to build a new stadium at the Black Rock seafront area and return the Brighton Bears name to the top flight British Basketball League.

== Honours ==
Men's National Shield: 2016-17
Men's National Development League South: 2015-16

== Season-by-season records ==
Season	Division	Tier	Regular Season						Post-Season	National Cup
Season	Division	Tier	Finish	Played	Wins	Losses	Points	Win %	Post-Season	National Cup
Sussex Bears
2014–15	D4 SE	5	3rd	20	15	5	30	0.750	1st round	Did not compete
2015–16	Dev Sou	5	1st	12	10	2	20	0.833	Semi-finals	1st round
2016–17	D3 Sou	4	2nd	18	13	5	26	0.722	Semi-finals	3rd round
2017–18	D2	3	10th	22	7	15	14	0.318	Did not qualify	2nd round
2018–19	D2	3	4th	20	11	9	22	0.550	Quarter-finals	Did not compete
2019–20	D2 Sou	3	9th	17	4	13	9	0.235	Did not qualify	4th round
2020-21	D2 Sou	3	Season cancelled due to COVID-19 pandemic							
2021–22	D2 Sou	3	2nd	22	16	6	32	0.727	Quarter-finals	3rd round
Brighton Bears
2022–23	D2 Sou	3	2nd	22	16	6	32	0.727	Quarter-finals	4th round
2023–24	D2 Sou	3	11th	22	5	17	10	0.227	Did Not Qualify	

== See also ==
- Brighton Bears (1973-2006)
