= London Westside =

- League: NBL D2 South
- Established: 2000; 26 years ago
- History: London Westside (2000–present)
- Arena: Kensington Leisure Centre
- Capacity: 500
- Location: Kensington, West London
- Team colours
- Website: Official website

London Westside B.C. are an English basketball club, based in the North Kensington area of West London, England.

== History ==
The club was founded in 2000, with strong links to the local community and to provide opportunity for talented local players to develop.

Westside had much early success in the regional leagues, and entered the English Basketball League for the first time in 2004.

The club was severely disrupted by the Grenfell Tower fire in 2017, with their main home venue out of action for a considerable period as a hub for the relief effort. The club were later awarded funds from the Grenfell Young People's Fund, raised by readers who donated to the London Evening Standard's Dispossessed Fund Grenfell Appeal, to support their youth development work.

== Honours ==
Men's National League Division 3 South League Champions: 2010-11
Men's National League Division 3 Playoffs Champions: 2010-11
Men's National Founders Cup: 2002-03

== Academy ==
The club is partnered with St Charles College, who compete in the Academies Basketball League. The ABL is the second-tier under 19's competition in the United Kingdom. St Charles were runners-up in the competition in 2019.

== Teams ==
For the 2019–20 season, Westside will field the following teams:

Senior Men - National League Division 2 South
U18 Men - National League U18 Premier South

U16 Boys - National League U16 Premier South
U16 Girls - National League U16 Premier South

U14 Boys - National League U14 Premier South East

== Home Venue ==
Westside are based at Kensington Leisure Centre and St Paul's School, London.

== Season-by-season records ==
Season	Division	Tier	Regular Season						Post-Season	National Cup
Season	Division	Tier	Finish	Played	Wins	Losses	Points	Win %	Post-Season	National Cup
London Westside
2011–12	D2	3	7th	20	9	11	18	0.450	Runners-Up	2nd round
2012–13	D2	3	9th	22	7	15	14	0.318	Did not qualify	2nd round
2013–14	D2	3	9th	20	8	12	16	0.400	Did not qualify	2nd round
2014–15	D2	3	8th	22	8	14	16	0.364	Quarter-finals	3rd round
2015–16	D2	3	10th	22	5	17	10	0.227	Did not qualify	1st round
2016–17	D2	3	5th	22	11	11	22	0.500	Quarter-finals	4th round
2017–18	D2	3	11th	22	6	16	12	0.273	Did not qualify	2nd round
2018–19	D2	3	8th	20	7	13	14	0.350	Quarter-finals	3rd round
2019–20	D2 Sou	3	2nd	16	11	5	24	0.688	No playoffs	3rd round
