= Greenwich Titans =

English basketball club

- League: NBL D2 South
- Established: 2012; 14 years ago
- History: Greenwich Titans (2012–present)
- Location: Greenwich, South London
- Team colours
- Website: Official website

The Greenwich Titans are an English basketball club, based in the London Borough of Greenwich.

== History ==
The Titans were formed in 2012 by the Greenwich Sports Academy, on the back of the London 2012 Olympics, to provide opportunities for the residents of Greenwich to play basketball and represent the area. The Titans entered the English Basketball League in the same year, and have steadily risen through the lower divisions of the league. As of the 2019-20 season, the Titans play in Division 2 South, the third tier of the British basketball system. The club also run 4 youth teams in the respective junior national leagues.

== Honours ==
National League Men's Division 3 South (1) : 2017–18
National League Men's Development League South East (1): 2015–16

== Teams ==
Senior Men - National League Division 2 South
U-18 Men - National League U-18 Premier South
U-16 Boys - National League U-16 Conference South

U-16 Girls - National League U-16 Conference South
U-14 Boys - National League U-14 Conference South

== Home Venue ==
The Titans are based at the Thomas Tallis School in Kidbrooke, Greenwich and Greenwich University.

== Notable former players ==
Worcester Wolves and BBL forward Jordan Williams has played for the Titans.

== Season-by-season records ==
Season	Division	Tier	Regular Season						Post-Season	National Cup
Season	Division	Tier	Finish	Played	Wins	Losses	Points	Win %	Post-Season	National Cup
Greenwich Titans
2012–13	D4 SE	5	9th	18	6	12	12	0.333	Did not qualify	1st round
2013–14	D4 SE	5	5th	22	14	8	28	0.636	Did not qualify	1st round
2014–15	D4 SE	5	4th	20	15	5	30	0.750	1st round	2nd round
2015–16	Dev SE	5	1st	18	16	2	32	0.889	1st round	2nd round
2016–17	D3 Sou	4	7th	18	8	10	16	0.444	Did not qualify	3rd round
2017–18	D3 Sou	4	1st	18	14	4	28	0.778	Semi-finals	2nd round
2018–19	D2	3	10th	20	6	14	12	0.300	Did not qualify	3rd round
2019–20	D2 Sou	3	8th	17	6	11	13	0.353	Did not qualify	2nd round
