= Sheffield Elite B.C. =

The Sheffield College
- League: NBL Division 2
- Established: 2001; 25 years ago
- History: Sheffield Sabres (2001–2021); Sheffield Elite (2021–present)
- Arena: The Sheffield College
- Location: Sheffield, England
- Head coach: Tom Morey (player-coach)
- Website: Official website

Sheffield Elite Basketball Academy, also known as The Sheffield College is an English basketball club and academy from Sheffield, South Yorkshire. They compete in NBL Division 2 which is 4th-tier in the British basketball pyramid.

== History ==
=== Sabres (2001–2021) ===
The Sabres entered NBL Division 2 North in 2001, effectively as a "spin off" second team for the Sheffield Sharks.who played in the BBL. The team initially struggled, finishing bottom of the league twice. With close links to Sheffield Hallam University, they had problems with matches near the start and end of terms, and during busy periods such as exams. They failed to complete all their matches in both their first and third seasons, and in 2003-4 they also forfeited no less than five games through late cancellation, thus playing only 15 of their 22 scheduled matches.

2004–5 proved much better for the Sabres, with a completed schedule and a fifth-place finish in Division 3 North, they built on this the following season as the Sharks junior programme became an integral part of the tie-up between the clubs. This enabled younger players to gain experience at Senior level, with several of the Juniors regularly playing for the Sabres.

This policy paid dividends in 2006, with a third-placed finish, and an appearance in the Division 3 Championship Final, and they remained competitive, finishing third again in 2010.

=== Elite (2021–present) ===
In 2021, the Sabres merged with the academy at Sheffield College to form Sheffield Elite.

== Season-by-season records ==
Season	Division	Tier	Regular Season						Post-Season	National Cup
Season	Division	Tier	Finish	Played	Wins	Losses	Points	Win %	Post-Season	National Cup
Sheffield Sabres
2009–10	D3 Nor	4	3rd	22	16	6	32	0.727	Quarter-finals	Did not compete
2010–11	D3 Nor	4	3rd	22	17	5	34	0.773	Quarter-finals	Did not compete
2011–12	D3 Nor	4	5th	22	13	9	26	0.591	Did not qualify	Did not compete
2012–13	D3 Nor	4	5th	22	14	8	28	0.636	Did not qualify	Did not compete
2013–14	D3 Nor	4	8th	20	6	14	12	0.300	Did not qualify	2nd round
2014–15	D3 Nor	4							Did not qualify	Did not compete
2015–16	Dev NE	5	3rd	12	8	4	16	0.667	1st round	Did not compete
2016–17	D4 Mid	5	9th	18	4	14	8	0.222	Did not qualify	Did not compete
2017–18	D4 Nor	5	2nd	22	17	5	34	0.773	Quarter-finals	Did not compete
2018–19	D3 Nor	4	9th	22	8	14	16	0.364	Did not qualify	Did not compete
2019–20	D3 Mid	4	8th	21	9	12	19	0.429	Did not qualify	Did not compete
Sheffield Elite
2021–22	D3 Nor	4	3rd	15	8	7	16	0.533	Did not qualify	
