= Bristol Storm Basketball Club =

Bristol Storm
- League: National Basketball League (England)
- Founded: 2006; 20 years ago
- History: Avon/Oakleigh 1976–1977; Frome Comets 1977–1986; Bristol Broncos 1995–1996
- Arena: St Mary Redcliffe and Temple School
- Location: Bristol
- Team colours: Blue, White, Black
- Head coach: David Senart
- Ownership: David Senart
- Website: bristolstorm.com

Bristol Storm are currently a juniors focused British Basketball Club based in the city of Bristol, England. Storm compete in multiple leagues affiliated with Basketball England, including local league West England Basketball Association (WEBBA), Southwest Jr Regional League, and Basketball England Jr National League. As of 2023 the club currently runs a total of nine teams including ages U12s, U14s, U16s, U18s, and a women's team. Storm has also partnered with Bristol Met Mambas to provide girls basketball as our sister affiliated program. The team currently play across multiple venues around the city due to the size of the club and lack of facilities in the area, but our home court is currently based out of St Mary Redcliffe and Temple School. Storm's Director and Club Head Coach is currently David Senart who joined the club as the under 18 boys head coach in 2018. After three successful seasons, Coach Senart took over Director duties from club Founder Steven Brocklehurst.

== History ==
The City Academy Bristol Storm are a British basketball team based in Bristol. They currently play in the England Basketball Women's National League South West.

The club was formed for the 2006/2007 season based at the City Academy in the centre of Bristol. The team was built around the players from the Ravens and Thunder local league teams. As additional strength former Backwell School players Nicola Gowing (University of Bath) and Ruth & Trish Groves (UWIC) came home to play for the Storm.

The club has a strong development programme with its development women playing in the West of England Basketball Association (WEBBA) local league, and will be running a summer league during June, July and August to help further develop other local players.

In addition to this the club branched out into Men's, under 12s, under 14s, under 16s and under 18s. The club was previously partnered with City Academy who still fly a Bristol Storm logo in their main sports hall, Storm also partnered with St Mary Redcliffe and over forty two primary schools in the central Bristol area including St Patricks and Hannah Moore. A community programme is also underway with the New Deal Communities covering OBI, Midnight Madness, Youth Clubs etc.

== Current Events & Club Updates ==
Since taking over Bristol Storm during the Covid pandemic, Club Director David Senart has seen tremendous growth in the sport across the city of Bristol. Not only have more players wanted to get involved, the direction of the club has become more performanced focus, looking to compete at the highest level possible in the United Kingdom across all age groups. In previous years the only option for competitive basketball was with the crosstown rivals Bristol Flyers Jr's program, however with a focus on performance and development Bristol Storm is now offering high level basketball to the youth of the city. Coach Senart focuses life skills and development of young men as a priority over basketball, as he feels basketball can teach transferable life skills to help these young men in the real world, such as problem solving, team work, leadership, communication, accountability, work ethic, emotional control, resiliency... the list goes on but all of these are crucial skills to develop to help these young men be successful in life. Integrity and Discipline are at the core of the club supported by Coach Senart's Character Tree and philosophy of Character Matters, supported by the roots of Respect, Integrity, Passion, Faith, Humility.

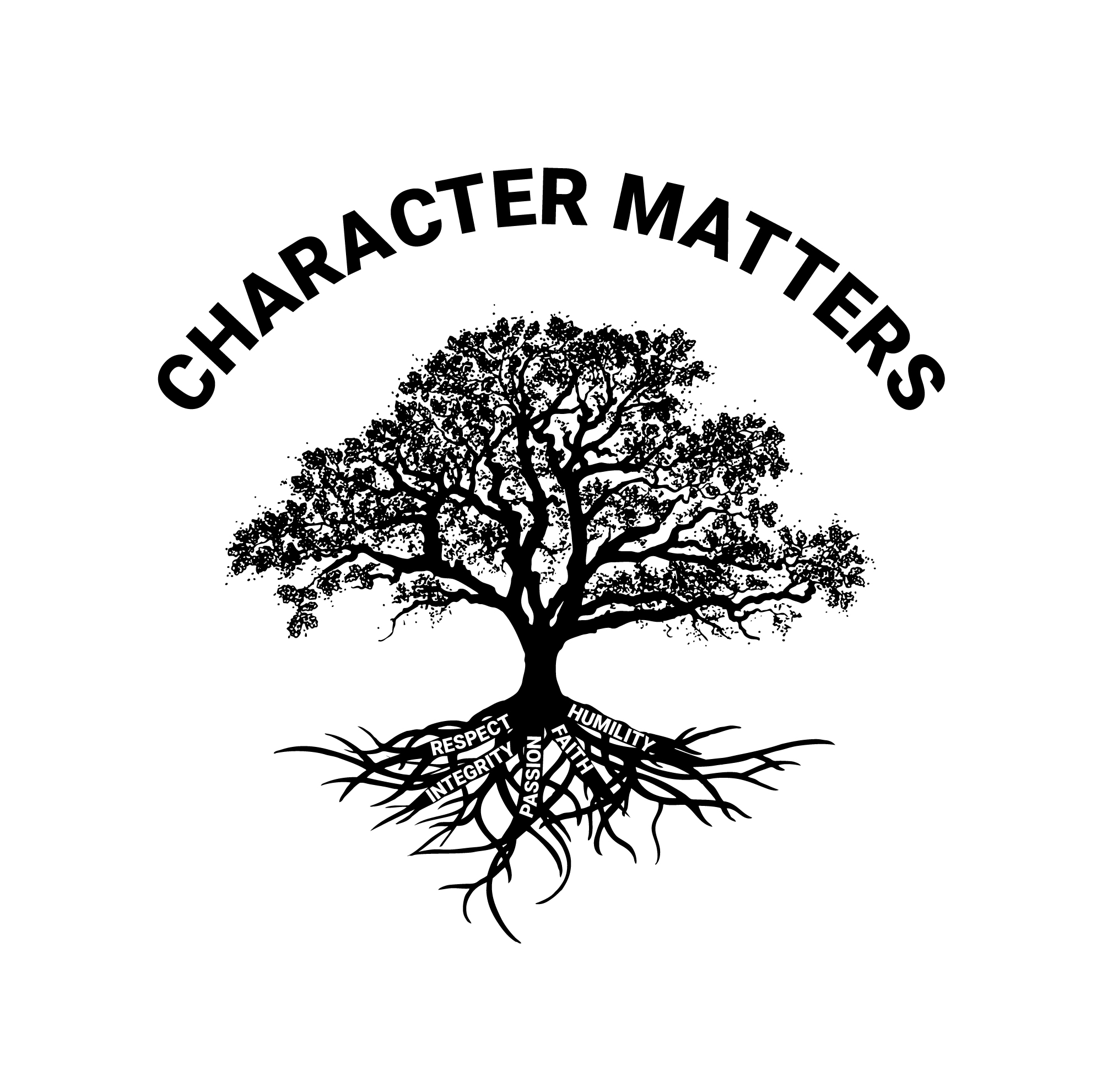
CharacterMatters4

== International Basketball Experiences ==
2022 The U18 Men's program entered into the largest European basketball tournament Euro Youth Basketball Cup. Storm faced teams from Lithuania, Spain, UK, and USA en route to becoming the 2022 U18 Champions.

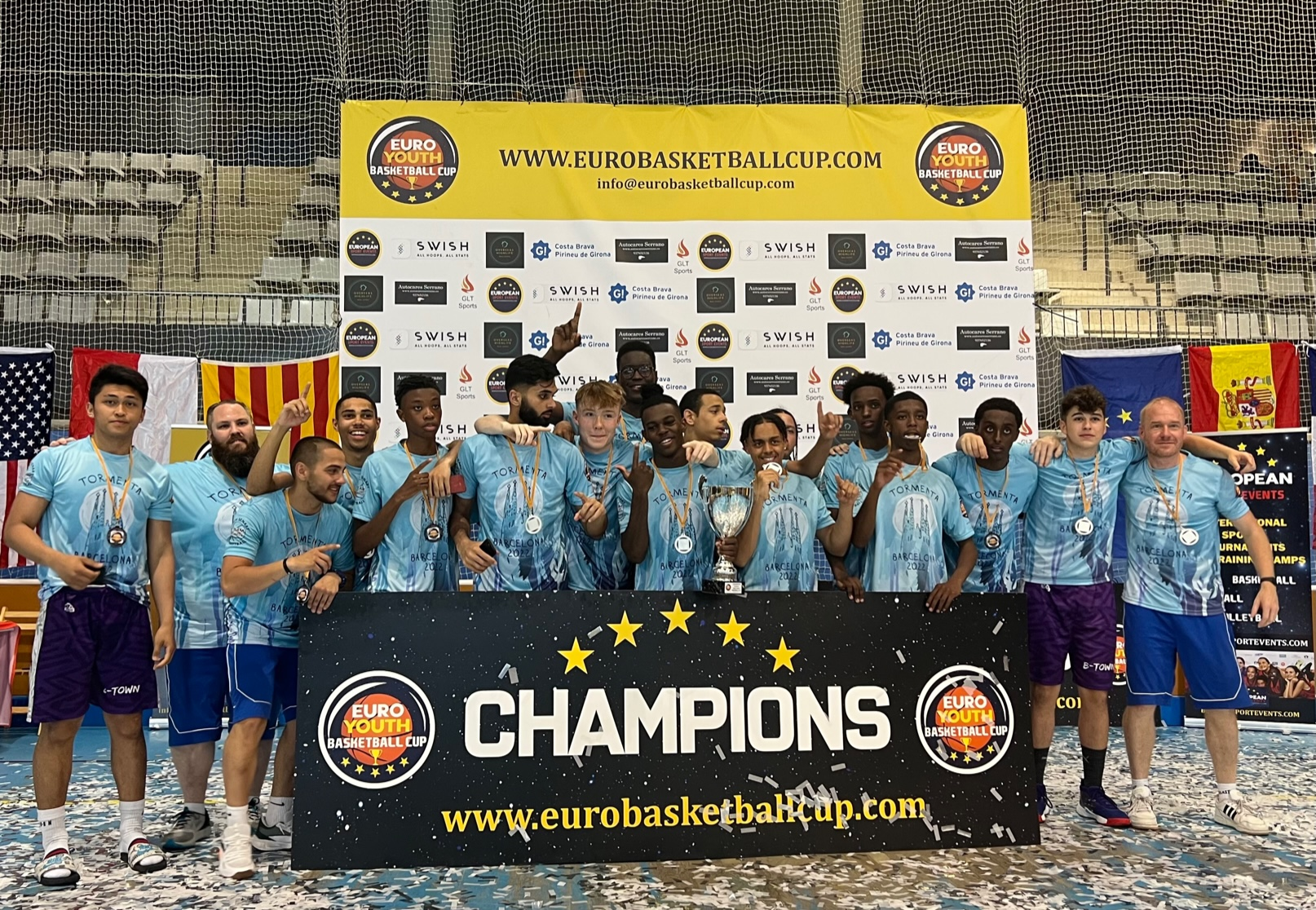
Cup Champions

Game 1 almost started without Head Coach David Senart who had is his passport stolen from the airport in Barcelona so had to spend the morning of day 1 at the US Embassy, however with a bit of luck he turned up with under 5 minutes to go before the first tournament tip. A strong Vilnius Basketball side took an 8-point fourth quarter lead but strong leadership from standout player L.A. Casinillo and a loud and supportive bench saw Storm leave victors 57–54. Game 2 was against a local Spanish side CB Palafolls that Storm won by over 30 points allowing good bench rotation. One Spanish team never arrived so this saw Storm finish top of the group and hosted the first Semi-Final vs English Premiere side Surrey Rams. Storm controlled the semi-final start to finish building a 20-point lead, but Surrey would not go away and dwindled the lead down as the game continued. Storm stayed poised finishing the game 64-54 victors, placing them in the finals vs USA Select team, USA PHD Hoops. Again Storm came out strong, taking double digit leads on multiple occasions. USA would not go away however and continued to push Storm to the buzzer before ultimately falling 68-62 crowning Storm the U18 2022 Euro Youth Cup Champions

Storm has also participated in the Portugal Basketball Festival in 2022, as well as the Euro Youth Cup in 2023 as Bristol Lions.

The year 2023 saw the Storm U16 boys travel to Scotland to participate in preseason friendlies to prepare for the season. Game 1 was a close battle versus a talented Falkirk Fury squad whose roster boasts several Scottish National players and more Scottish Regional players. Storm fell short at the end 49–57. The next day however Storm faced off against former Scottish and GB U18 Head Coach Craig Nicol's City of Edinburgh Kings. Storm having time to recover from the long northern trip and the first day's loss came out on fire ultimately winning day 2's game 95–55. Day 3 saw a double header at Dundee Madsons U16s and Dunfermline Reign U18s. While the trip was taking a toll, the boys came walked away victors in both games ending the trip on a very positive experience.
