= Westminster Warriors =

- League: NBL Division 2
- Established: 1987; 39 years ago
- History: Westminster Warriors; 1987–present
- Arena: Moberly Sports Centre
- Location: Westminster, London
- Website: westminsterwarriors.org

The Westminster Warriors are a basketball club based in the Westminster area of the City of Westminster. The club currently has a senior Men's team competing in the English Basketball League (EBL) Division 1, in addition to a senior Women's team playing in the local London league and junior teams at Under-14, Under-16 and Under-18 levels. The club are based at Moberly Sports Centre, and take pride in having developed 5 Senior Men's England Internationals from within a 3 miles (4.8 kilometres) radius of their home venue.

== History ==
The club were originally formed in 1987 as a community basketball programme, focusing on using basketball as the core of a wider personal development mission, and developing a proud tradition of positively impacting the lives of young people from the local community. The club soon put out a competitive senior Men's team, and enjoyed a long and successful period in the former National Basketball League, working their way up to the pinnacle of Division One before the senior teams were disbanded in 2005 in order to focus on youth development.

The senior Men's team was reinstated in 2007, and began the slow process of working their way back to the heights reached by the former team. Starting in English Basketball League (EBL) Division 4 (Midlands / South), the Warriors won the Division Four title at the first attempt and then followed this up with a victory in the Division 3 playoffs the following year, clinching back-to-back promotions in their first two seasons back in the league. While Division Two proved a sterner test, the Warriors claimed second place in the 2011 Division Two playoffs to claim a further promotion back to Division One, claiming a place once again among the elite of English basketball.

== Season-by-season records ==
Season	Division	Tier	Regular Season						Post-Season	National Cup
Season	Division	Tier	Finish	Played	Wins	Losses	Points	Win %	Post-Season	National Cup
Westminster Warriors
1994-95	D2									
1995-96	D2									
1996-97	D1	2	6th	26	15	11	41	0.578		
1997-98	D1	2	9th	22	6	16	12	0.273	Did not qualify	
1998-99	D1	2	9th	26	9	17	18	0.346	Did not qualify	
1999-00	D1	2	10th	24	7	17	14	0.292	Did not qualify	
2000-01	D1	3	3rd	18	10	8	20	0.556	Quarter-finals	
2001-02	D1	3	6th	22	11	11	23	0.500	Quarter-finals	
2002-03	D1	3	4th	16	9	7	18	0.563	Quarter-finals	
2003-04	D2	3	6th	20	10	10	20	0.500	Semi-finals	
2004-07	Withdrew from league									
2007-08	D4 M/S	5								
2008-09	D3 Sou	4								
2009-10	D2	3	5th	20	12	8	24	0.600	Quarter-finals	2nd round
2010-11	D2	3	4th	20	13	7	26	0.650	Runners-up	3rd round
2011-12	D1	2	12th	24	3	21	6	0.125	Did not qualify	3rd round
2012-13	D1	2	12th	26	10	16	20	0.385	Did not qualify	3rd round
2013-14	D1	2	12th	26	7	19	14	0.269	Did not qualify	3rd round
2014-15	D1	2	12th	24	6	18	12	0.250	Did not qualify	2nd round
2015-16	D1	2	11th	26	6	20	12	0.231	Did not qualify	4th round
2016-17	D1	2	14th	26	2	24	4	0.077	Did not qualify	Quarter-finals
2017-18	D2	3	5th	22	14	8	28	0.636	Semi-finals	4th round
2018-19	D2	3	2nd	20	14	6	28	0.700	Runners-up	3rd round
2019-20	D1	2	13th	24	3	21	8	0.125	Did not qualify	4th round

== Notable players ==
- (United Kingdom) Julius Joseph
- (United Kingdom) Tosin Oyelese
- (United Kingdom) (Nigeria) Oladapo Fagbenle
- (Angola) Edmir Lucas
- (Kosovo) Artan Mehmeti
