= Gateshead Leisure Centre =

Leisure centre in Gateshead, England

Coordinates: 54.9513°N 1.6027°W

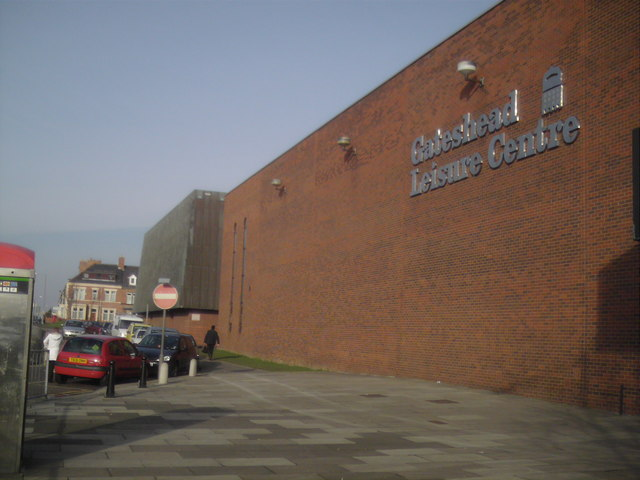
- Interactive map of the Gateshead Leisure Centre area

General information
- Type: Leisure centre
- Location: Alexandra Road, Gateshead, United Kingdom
- Operator: Gateshead Active

Website
- gatesheadleisurecentre.co.uk

Gateshead Leisure Centre is a leisure centre located in Gateshead, England. It offers a variety of facilities and services to the local community, including swimming pools, a fitness suite, sports halls, and various exercise classes.

== History ==
The Gateshead Leisure Centre was opened in the early 1980s. It was originally operated by Gateshead Council. After the council concluded that they were unable to run the centre because of budget issues, it was closed in July 2023. The centre's management was transferred to community-led group Gateshead Active and reopened in June 2024.

== Facilities ==
The leisure centre includes swimming pools, a gym, sports halls and wall climbing. It also provides a range of fitness and exercise classes.
