= London Lituanica =

- League: EBL Division 1
- Established: 2010; 10 years ago
- Dissolved: 2017; 3 years ago
- History: Baltic Staff (2010–2012); London Lituanica (2012–2017)
- Location: London
- Team colours: Yellow and green
- Head coach: (Lithuania) A. Mejeras
- Ownership: Linas Bridickas
- Website: lituanicabc.com
Home

London Lituanica was a British basketball team who competed in the English Basketball League.

== History ==
The team was created in 2010 by Lithuanian immigrants in London and started playing the Britain Lithuanians Basketball League.

In 2012, Lituanica joined the English Basketball League Division 3 finishing as runner-up of the league after losing to Plymouth Marjon in the finals. The club had the goal to be the strongest Lithuanian team in the UK and hopes joining the British Basketball League in the next years.

In 2015 Lituanica achieved promotion to the top division of the EBL after being crowned as champion of the Division 2.

On 14 September 2017, just one season after their debut in the Division 1, the club announced its withdrawal from competition.

== Season to season ==
Season	Division	Pos.	Playoffs
2012–13	EBL Division 3	3rd	Runner-up
2013–14	EBL Division 3	1st	Champion
2014–15	EBL Division 2	1st	Champion
2015–16	EBL Division 1	8th	Quarterfinalist
2016–17	EBL Division 1	10th	

== See also ==
- London BC Medelynas
