= Shropshire Warriors =

- Shropshire Warriors logo
- League: English Basketball League
- Established: 2010
- History: New Franchise
- Location: Shropshire, West Midlands
- Team colours: Yellow
- Ownership: Tom Sunley
Home	Away

The Shropshire Warriors is a basketball team from Shropshire. It competed in the premier basketball league and is now in the English Basketball League in division 4.

== History ==
The club was established in 1998 by members of the Committee of the Shropshire Schools Basketball Association (SSBBA) and the Shropshire Basketball Association to provide opportunities for players in full time education in Shropshire to play regular competitive basketball at higher than Inter-School level.
