= Lancashire Spinners =

English basketball club

- League: Men's: Division 3 North; Women's: Division 2 North
- Established: 1962
- History: Old Rossendalians; 1962-1989; Rossendale Basketball Club; 1989-2010; Rossendale Raptors; 2010-2014; Lancashire Spinners; 2014-present
- Arena: Bury Sport for All Centre'
- Capacity: 150-200
- Location: Whitefield, Greater Manchester
- Team colours
- Head coach: Mbongeni Greg Mpofu
- Website: Official website

The Lancashire Spinners are an English basketball club from Whitefield, Greater Manchester.

The Spinners currently operates a Men's senior team in the National Basketball League, competing in Division 3 North, and a Women's senior team in the Women's National Basketball League. The club have held England Basketball Clubmark accreditation since 2011, and also enter Women's and Junior teams in local competition.

== Club history ==
Originally formed as an amateur outfit, the club started life as the Old Rossendalians, competing in local competition for several years before being invited to join the Manchester & District League in 1968. Despite the step up to regional competition, the club remained a small, locally focused organisation for many years, until a drive to attract players from outside the valley saw the club re-branded as the Rossendale Basketball Club in 1989. The award of a Lottery grant in 2001 paved the way for the club to expand their offering by developing a junior program, leading to a merger with the local Rossendale Aliens junior team.

The growth of the club re-energised the organisation, which led to greater investment from sponsors and in turn saw the club renamed as the Rossendale Raptors in 2010, followed swiftly by successfully applying for Basketball England Clubmark accreditation at the start of 2011 and making their debut in the national Division Four (North) league for the 2011/2012 season. The newly named club's inaugural season at national level saw the Raptors claim the Division Four (North) title with a 20-2 record, setting up a run through to the final of the end-of-season playoffs where they defeated the Worcester Wolves' second team 91-87.

Stepping up to Division Three for the following year, the Raptors took sixth place in their first season and followed that up in their second by winning 17 of their 20 games on the way to the Division Three (North) title. While the Hackney White Heat prevented them from repeating the playoff victory, a second promotion in three years was achieved regardless. With the goal of establishing themselves at national level complete, the club relocated to the Castle Leisure Centre in Bury and rebranded themselves as the Lancashire Spinners in 2014 to attract a wider audience and to prepare for a future push towards the professional leagues.

The following year saw the club battling at the top of the Division Two table against London Lituanica in an incredibly close campaign between two strong teams in the midst of a rapid rise through the league structure. While the Spinners narrowly finished as runners-up to their new rivals in a close league campaign and playoff final, the club did not end the 2014/2015 season empty-handed, claiming the Patrons Cup with a 118-86 win in the final against Lituanica. A post-season merger with the local Bury Blue Devils team also added a Women's team to the Spinners organisation, while massively strengthening the junior ranks to give local talent more opportunities to develop on their way to the senior teams.

== Club Honours ==
NBL Division 3 North Champions

- 2020

Patrons Cup Winners

- 2015

EBL Division 3 League Champions

- 2014

EBL Division 4 League Champions

- 2012

EBL Division 4 Playoff Champions

- 2012

== Season-by-season records ==
Season	Division	Tier	Pos.	Played	Won	Lost	Points	Playoffs	National Cup
Rossendale Raptors
2011-12	D4 North	5	1st	22	20	2	40	Winners	1st round
2012-13	D3 North	4	6th	22	14	8	28	DNQ	2nd round
2013-14	D3 North	4	1st	20	17	3	34	Quarter-final	2nd round
Lancashire Spinners
2014-15	D2	3	2nd	22	19	3	38	Runner-Up	3rd round
2015-16	D1	2	7th	26	16	10	32	Quarter-finals	Quarter-finals
2016-17	D1	2	11th	26	7	19	14	DNQ	3rd round
2017-18	D1	2	13th	24	0	24	0	DNQ	3rd round
2018-19	Withdrew from league								
2019-20	D3 Nor	4	1st	22	19	3	38	No playoffs	Did not compete
