= East London All-Stars =

- League: NBL Division 2
- Established: 2010
- Arena: UEL Sportsdock (Capacity: 500)
- Location: Newham, East London
- Team colours: Black, White and Red
- Website: Official website
Home	Away

The East London All-Stars are a basketball club based in the Newham area of East London.

The team was formed in 2010 as the senior team of the Newham All-Star Sports Academy, or NASSA for short, and were originally named Newham Neptunes before being rebranded to East London All-Stars in 2015. This name lasted only one season, returning to Newham Neptunes in time for the 2016-17 season. As of the 2018-19 season, the club were the All-Stars once more.

The All-Stars play their home games at the University of East London's SportsDock facility, and currently compete in the English Basketball League (EBL) Division 2. The team achieved a rapid ascension through the lower divisions of English basketball since their establishment and spent several years in Division 1 before being relegated in 2015.

== Home arenas ==
Rokeby School (2011–2012)
University of East London - Sportsdock (2012–present)
