= Sheffield Arrows =

Encon Sheffield Arrows
- League: NBL Division 1
- Established: 1991; 35 years ago
- History: Derbyshire Arrows; 1991-2003; City of Sheffield Arrows; 2003-2011; Derbyshire Arrows; 2011-2025; Sheffield Arrows; 2025-present
- Arena: The Sheffield College - Hillsborough Campus
- Location: Sheffield, South Yorkshire
- Main sponsor: Encon Insulation
- Head coach: Jonny Kelly

The Sheffield Arrows, known as The Encon Sheffield Arrows for sponsorship reasons, are an English basketball club based in Sheffield, South Yorkshire. The Arrows play in National Basketball League Division 1, the third tier of British basketball. The club also have a women's academy, partnered with The Sheffield College, and playing in the Elite Academy Basketball League (EABL), the premier junior competition in the country.

== History ==
Founded in 1991 to compete in local league competition, the Men's team joined the National Basketball League in 1998, starting in Division 3. The first couple of years in national competition saw mixed results, before changes at both club and league in 2000 ushered in a golden era for the club. First, former BBL talent Garnet Gayle joined as player/coach, closely followed by a restructure of the league which rebranded the third tier as Division 2. The Arrows then claimed the 2000/2001 league title without suffering a single defeat, earning promotion to Division 1 in the process. Further glories were to follow, taking back-to-back doubles of the league and playoff titles in 2001/2002 and 2002/2003. However, the club were denied a promotion to the NBL Conference as their home court did not meet the minimum standard required.

To allow the club to advance further, they moved to the English Institute of Sport in Sheffield, rebranding as the City of Sheffield Arrows. The national league was also rebranded as the English Basketball League in 2003, and the new league structure saw the Arrows finally admitted to the top level of English competition, taking a place in the new EBL Division 1. Another league and playoff double was to follow in 2005, this time with the National Trophy added to the EBL Division One title and playoff titles. Since winning their last title in 2005, the club have fallen from their peak, a gradual decline in results culminating in a last-place league finish in 2010 and relegation to Division 2. The drop to a more modest league saw the club return to their original Killamarsh home and reclaim their former name in 2011, and despite being ever-present in the end-of-season playoffs, the team have yet to return to Division 1.

== Players ==
=== Current roster ===
Note: Flags indicate national team eligibility at FIBA-sanctioned events. Players may hold other non-FIBA nationalities not displayed.

Sheffield Arrows roster
Players
Coaches

Pos.	No.	Nat.	Name	Ht.	Wt.
G	4	(United States)	Kelly, Porter	1.85 m (6 ft 1 in)
G	5	(United Kingdom)	Nelson, Malachi	1.85 m (6 ft 1 in)
G	7	(United Kingdom)	Paredes, Jacob	1.83 m (6 ft 0 in)
G	10	(United Kingdom)	Handuleh, Harrun	1.85 m (6 ft 1 in)
G	12	(United Kingdom)	Wildie, Harrison	1.91 m (6 ft 3 in)
G	15	(United Kingdom)	Ibrahim, Hamza	1.91 m (6 ft 3 in)
F	23	(Portugal)	Soares, Diogo	1.98 m (6 ft 6 in)
G	23	(United Kingdom)	Askwith, Isaac	1.83 m (6 ft 0 in)
F	33	(Portugal)	Prado, Joao	1.98 m (6 ft 6 in)
F	23	(United Kingdom)	Ibrahim, Mahamud	1.98 m (6 ft 6 in)
F		(United Kingdom)	Weber, Jerry	1.98 m (6 ft 6 in)

Head coach

- Jonny Kelly

Assistant coach(es)

- James Kelly

Legend

- (C) Team captain
- Injured

== Honours ==
NBL Division 1 League Champions

- 2002, 2003

EBL Division 1 League Champions

- 2005

NBL Division 1 Playoff Champions

- 2002, 2003

EBL Division 1 Playoff Champions

- 2005

NBL Division 2 League Champions

- 2001

National Trophy Champions

- 2005

== Season-by-season records ==
Season	Division	Tier	Pos	Played	Won	Lost	Points	Playoffs	National Cup	National Trophy	Patron's Cup	National Shield
Derbyshire Arrows
1998-99	D3 Mid	5	7th	20	9	11	18	Quarter-Final		1st Round	DNE	DNE
1999-00	D3 Mid	5	11th	24	5	19	10	DNQ		3rd Round	DNE	DNE
2000-01	D2	4	1st	24	24	0	48	Runner-Up		DNE	DNE	
2001-02	D1	3	1st	22	20	2	40	Winners		Quarter-Final	DNE	DNE
2002-03	D1	3	1st	16	14	2	28	Winners		Semi-Final	DNE	DNE
City of Sheffield Arrows
2003-04	D1	2	7th	22	10	12	20	Quarter-Final	1st Round	Semi-Final	DNE	DNE
2004-05	D1	2	1st	22	21	1	42	Winners	Runner-Up	Winners	DNE	DNE
2005-06	D1	2	3rd	26	20	6	40	Semi-Final	Semi-Final	Runner-Up	DNE	DNE
2006-07	D1	2	7th	22	11	11	22	Quarter-Final	Quarter-Final	1st Round	DNE	DNE
2007-08	D1	2	7th	18	8	10	16	Quarter-Final	2nd Round	Semi-Final	DNE	DNE
2008-09	D1	2	4th	18	10	8	20	Semi-Final	2nd Round	Semi-Final	DNE	DNE
2009-10	D1	2	12th	22	3	19	6	DNQ	Quarter-Final	1st Round	DNE	DNE
2010-11	D2	3	10th	20	2	18	4	DNQ	3rd Round	DNE	1st Round	DNE
Derbyshire Arrows
2011-12	D2	3	6th	20	10	10	20	Semi-Final	2nd Round	DNE	Runner-Up	DNE
2012-13	D2	3	4th	22	13	9	26	Quarter-Final	2nd Round	DNE	Semi-Final	DNE
2013-14	D2	3	8th	20	9	11	18	Quarter-Final	2nd Round	DNE	1st Round	DNE
2014-15	D2	3	6th	22	12	10	24	Quarter-Final		DNE		DNE
2015-16	D2	3	8th	22	11	11	22	Quarter-Final		DNE		DNE
2016-17	D2	3	8th	22	8	14	16			DNE		DNE
2017-18	D2	3	6th	22	9	13	18	Quarter-Final		DNE		DNE
2018-19	D2	3	9th	20	6	14	12	DNQ		DNE		DNE

Notes:

- From 2000 to 2003 the NBL Conference operated as the second-tier league, ahead of Division One.
- In 2003 the NBL was replaced by the EBL, which reinstated Division One as the second tier.
