= Manchester Magic =

- League: NBL D2 North
- Established: 1997; 29 years ago
- History: Manchester Giants B 1997-1998; City of Manchester Attitude; 1998-2000; Manchester Magic; 2000-present
- Arena: Manchester Basketball Centre
- Capacity: 1,000
- Team colours
- Website: Official website
Home	Away

The Manchester Giants are an English basketball club from the city of Manchester in the northwest of England.

For the 2019-20 season, the Magic will compete in the National Basketball League Division 2 North. They play their home games at the Manchester Basketball Centre, which was part-funded by former NBA star John Amaechi. A sister team, the Manchester Mystics, compete in the top-tier Women's British Basketball League.

== History ==
The Magic were first established in 1997, originally as a reserve squad for the nearby Manchester Giants, entering the newly founded NBL Division 3 for the 1997/1998 season and winning immediate promotion as league runner-up and playoff champions. A change in direction from their one-time parent club saw the fledgling team become independent mid-way through their first season in Division Two, choosing the City of Manchester Attitude as their new name. A first league title was to follow at the end of the 1999/2000 season, with the club joining the top flight just as the national league was being restructured, forming the short-lived NBL Conference.

After rebranding as the Manchester Magic, the club enjoyed over a decade of success in the top tier of the English Basketball League, with the highlight being a triple title success in the 2007/2008 season, claiming the National Cup alongside the league and playoff titles. The team then took the shock decision to play in Division 3 for the 2011/12 season, in order "to forge a much closer link between the youngsters... and the men's team", in the words of club director Joe Forber. The club worked their way back up the English leagues in record time, winning Division 3 at the first attempt to earn a return to Division 2, and then gaining back-to-back promotions with a runner-up spot in Division 2 in the 2012/13 season.

Since returning to Division 1, the Magic have claimed both the National Cup and National Trophy in the 2014/15 season, alongside second-place finishes in both the league and the end-of-season playoffs.

== Club honours ==
National Cup

- 2007, 2008, 2015, 2016

National Trophy

- 2015, 2016

EBL Division 1 League Champions

- 2008

EBL Division 1 Playoff Champions

- 2008, 2010

EBL Division 2 League Champions

- 2000

EBL Division 3 League Champions

- 2012

EBL Division 3 Playoff Champions

- 1998

== Season-by-season records ==
Season	Division	Tier	Pos.	Played	Won	Lost	Points	Playoffs	National Cup	National Trophy	Patrons Cup	National Shield
Manchester Giants B
1997-98	D3	4	2nd	26	15	11	30	Winners		1st round	DNE	DNE
City of Manchester Attitude
1998-99	D2	3	3rd	24	18	6	36	Semi-Final		2nd round	DNE	DNE
1999-00	D2	3	1st	24	20	4	40	Runner-Up		2nd round	DNE	DNE
Manchester Magic
2000-01	Conf	2	4th	21	9	7	18	Semi-Final		Quarter-Final	DNE	DNE
2001-02	Conf	2	5th	18	9	9	18	Semi-Final		Semi-Final	DNE	DNE
2002-03	Conf	2	5th	22	12	10	24	Semi-Final	1st round	1st round	DNE	DNE
2003-04	D1	2	4th	22	16	6	32	Quarter-Final	Quarter-Final	1st round	DNE	DNE
2004-05	D1	2	6th	22	12	10	24	Quarter-Final	Quarter-Final	1st round	DNE	DNE
2005-06	D1	2	4th	26	19	7	38	Semi-Final	Quarter-Final	1st round	DNE	DNE
2006-07	D1	2	3rd	22	17	5	34	Runner-Up	Winners	Semi-Final	DNE	DNE
2007-08	D1	2	1st	18	16	2	32	Winners	Winners	Semi-Final	DNE	DNE
2008-09	D1	2	2nd	18	15	3	30	Runner-Up	Runner-Up	Runner-Up	DNE	DNE
2009-10	D1	2	2nd	22	16	6	32	Winners	Runner-Up	Runner-Up	DNE	DNE
2010-11	D1	2	6th	18	7	11	14	Quarter-Final	3rd round	1st round	DNE	DNE
2011-12	D3 Nor	4	1st	22	19	3	38	Runner-Up	2nd round	DNE	DNE	Quarter-Final
2012-13	D2	3	2nd	22	15	7	30	Runner-Up	3rd round	DNE	1st round	DNE
2013-14	D1	2	5th	26	16	10	32	Quarter-Final	Semi-Final	Runner-Up	DNE	DNE
2014-15	D1	2	2nd	24	17	7	34	Runner-Up	Winners	Winners	DNE	DNE
2015-16	D1	2	1st	26	23	3	46	Winners			DNE	DNE
2016-17	D1	2	2nd	26	21	5	42	Winners			DNE	DNE
2017-18	D1	2	8th	24	11	13	22	Quarter-finals			DNE	DNE
2018-19	D1	2	14th	26	2	24	4	Did not qualify			DNE	DNE
2019-20	D2 Nor	3	5th	18	10	8	22	Did not qualify	3rd round			
