= Mid-South Basketball Association =

Minor league men's basketball circuit

Mid-South Basketball Association (MSBA)
- Sport: Basketball
- Founded: 2018
- First season: 2019
- Folded: 2019
- No. of teams: 4
- Country: United States
- Continent: FIBA Americas (Americas)
- Last champion: St. Louis Trotters (Fall 2019)
- Most titles: St. Louis Trotters (2)
- Website: midsouthball.com

The Mid-South Basketball Association (MSBA) was a minor league men's basketball circuit that began play in the spring of 2019 with teams in Kentucky, Missouri, and Tennessee. The league had two seasons (spring and fall) per calendar year.

== History ==
The inaugural spring season of 2019 began with seven member teams. In addition two teams (Cincinnati Movement, Louisville Diesel) played as affiliates with their games counting in the regular season standings was played with seven teams. Following a 10-game regular season the St. Louis Trotters defeated Tennessee Sting to win the first MSBA championship. It was a third league title for the Trotters who won championships in the Independent Basketball Association in Spring 2015 and Spring 2017.

MSBA sat out 2020 due to the COVID-19 pandemic. On February 13, 2021, the MSBA and its teams merged with the Pro Basketball Association. Less than two months later four of the original MSBA teams left the PBA to form the New Nation Basketball Association.

== Teams ==
Team	City	Home facility	First MSBA season
Henderson Hornets	Henderson, KY	Henderson County High School	Fall 2019
Memphis Blues	Memphis, TN	Juvenile Intervention and Faith-based Follow-Up	Fall 2019
St. Louis Trotters	St. Louis, MO	Mathews-Dickey Boys' & Girls' Club	Spring 2019
Tennessee Sting	Nashville, TN	St. Pius X Classical Academy	Spring 2019

=== Former teams ===
- Henderson Stars (2019)
- Hoptown Hustlas (2019)
- Kentucky Flash (2019) - removed after Fall regular season after failing to fulfill obligations to league
- Kentucky Warriors (2019)
- Music City Kings (2019) - removed after failing to fulfill obligations to league
- Smoky Mountain Black Bears (2019) - team folded
- Southeast Kentucky Soldiers (2019) - dismissed by the league after four games

== Champions ==
MSBA champions
Season	Champion	Runner-up	Result
Spring 2019	St. Louis Trotters	Tennessee Sting	120-108
Fall 2019	St. Louis Trotters	Memphis Blues	109-105
