= John Coffino =

John D. Coffino
- Born: November 7, 1962; The Bronx, New York
- Citizenship: U.S.
- Education: B.C. Social Science, Criminal Justice and Communications
- Occupations: American & international basketball coach, scout, athletic mentor
- Years active: 1992–present

John D. Coffino is an American basketball coach, athletic mentor, and scout with extensive experience across the NBA, D-League, FIBA, Europe, Asia, Africa, and the Middle East. He coached for 5 years for NJCAA, National Powerhouse Weschester Community College, NCAA Div I & II, the ABA, ABL, and high school levels. After a long tenure coaching overseas, Coffino returned to the United States in 2018, going on to serve as head coach at several post-graduate sports academies, including IMG Academy, FCP Coastal Prep Sports Academy, and a 4A academy in Florida. In February 2024, he headed overseas once more, signing with Al Qadsiah Club in Saudi Arabia as Head Coach to build and lead a Senior Men's Basketball program while overseeing their youth program. He led his all-Saudi team to the Championship Finals and earned a promotion to the next level of Division I. Coffino now brings that wealth of experience to coaching, player development, and college placement programs. Beyond coaching and recruiting, he also trains and certifies coaches, runs grassroots youth programs, and leads basketball clinics. Presently coach Coffino is working as a trainer for the nonprofit organization Klinic Kids. Every summer, he works at overseas and U.S. basketball camps across Los Angeles, Las Vegas, Florida, Massachusetts, and New York. Coffino speaks several languages and is active on social media.

== Early Coaching (1992–2006) ==
Coffino began his coaching career at Westchester Community College (1992–97) in Valhalla, New York, where he served as Associate Head Coach and guided the Vikings to the National Junior College Athletic Association (NJCAA) Division I Tournament in 1993. Coffino was inducted into the Westchester Sports Hall of Fame in November 2026. Before joining the professional ranks, Coffino served as a Division I assistant coach at three Metro Atlantic Athletic Conference (MAAC) schools: * Iona College, New Rochelle, New York (1997–99) * Niagara University, New York (1999–2002) * St. Peter's College, Jersey City (2002–06) Each program advanced to the MAAC Championship game during his tenure. Notably, the St. Peter's team rose from last place in the conference to the MAAC Championship game after Coffino joined the coaching staff. While at St. Peter's, Coffino and Wagner College head coach Mike Deane served as NCAA Tournament analysts on The Wally and the Keeg Show on 1050 ESPN Radio in New York City.

== NBA Development League (2007–2010) ==
Coffino was originally asked by then-head coach Jeff Ruland to join the Albuquerque Thunderbirds of the NBA Development League as an assistant coach in 2007–08, reuniting the two after their time together at Iona College in the late 1990s. Coffino was subsequently promoted to head coach, a position he held from 2008 to 2010. Players he coached with the Thunderbirds included Alando Tucker, DJ Strawberry (Phoenix Suns), Carlos Powell, Kevin Pittsnogle, Keith McLeod, and Antoine Agudio.

== Albany Legends and Twin City United (2012) ==
In April 2012, Coffino was named head coach of the Albany Legends of the Independent Basketball Association (IBA), guiding them to the IBA Championship game. He subsequently served as Head Coach and General Manager of the Twin City United in the ABL, leading the team to the Texas Division Championship in 2012–13.

== International coaching (2011–to present ) ==
Coffino began his international coaching career in 2011 as Head Coach of Qatar Sports Club in the Qatar Basketball League. He also worked as an analyst on Al Jazeera Sport's sports programming and at EuroBasket Academy during this period. In August 2013, Coffino became Head Coach and Director of Basketball Operations at Dankind Academy in Nairobi, Kenya, where his team won the NBA Africa championship. He also coached the varsity boys basketball team and JV girls basketball team at the International School of Kenya, leading the boys team to the ISEAA Championship Finals in 2013–14.

In June 2014, Coffino was appointed head coach of the Cheshire Phoenix of the British Basketball League (BBL). His hiring was endorsed by several prominent NBA figures, including Mitch Kupchak, General Manager of the Los Angeles Lakers, former coach Bob Hill, and Jeff Ruland, former NBA All-Star and coach of the Philadelphia 76ers. In December 2014, Coffino was awarded the Molten BBL Coach of the Month award after leading the Phoenix on an eight-game winning streak.

In the summer of 2015, Coffino was appointed head coach of BC Sukhumi in the Georgian Superliga, and simultaneously coached the under-20, under-18, and under-16 Georgia Basketball League teams. In November 2015, he became Head Coach of the Boys and Girls Basketball Program at QSI International School of Tbilisi, whose High School Boys team won 1st place in the Basketball Classics Tournament in 2015, 2016, 2017, and 2018. From September 2017 to May 2018, he served as Supervisor of Basketball Coaches at Zaza Pachulia's Basketball Academy in Tbilisi.

From May to December 2018, Coffino served as head coach of the senior men's national basketball team for the Republic of the Maldives, guiding the team to the gold round of the regional tournament in Bangladesh.

In June 2019, Coffino signed with BK Vejen '82 in Denmark's first division, guiding the club from the bottom of the league to one of its most competitive teams.

In February 2024, Coffino signed a contract with Al Qadsiah Club in Saudi Arabia as Head Coach, tasked with building and leading a new Senior Men's Basketball program from the ground up. Under his direction, the team advanced to the Saudi Championship Finals and earned promotion to the next level of Division I competition.

== The United States (2019–present) ==
In October 2019, Coffino returned to Florida, where he joined IMG Academy in Bradenton, Florida as a coach and recruiter. From September 2020 to April 2021, he served as Head Coach of the Boys Basketball Post-Graduate 4A Sports Academy. In September 2021, he became Director of Basketball at Prestige Worldwide Sports Academy, where he oversees coaching, player development, and college placement.

In addition to his coaching duties, Coffino trains and certifies coaches, runs grassroots youth programs, and works at overseas basketball camps each summer in Los Angeles, Las Vegas, Florida, Massachusetts, and New York. He is a frequent guest on sports programs and podcasts including the MVP Cast, Never Follow Trends Podcast, The Mindset Athlete, and FBBL360.

Coffino has participated as a coach or guest speaker at numerous basketball schools, exposure camps, and coaching clinics, including programs at Duke University, Syracuse University, Manhattan College, Iona College, Niagara University, Fairfield University, and Seton Hall University, as well as the Scorers First Las Vegas Showcase, the Las Vegas Combine, Europrobasket, NBA D-League national tryouts, and the Hoop Group Florida Combine.
