= 2004 United States House of Representatives elections in Tennessee =

- November 2, 2004

All 9 Tennessee seats to the United States House of Representatives
- Turnout: 66.32% ▲15.92 pp
	Majority party	Minority party
Party	Democratic	Republican
Last election	5	4
Seats won	5	4
Seat change	Steady	Steady
Popular vote	1,031,959	1,160,821
Percentage	46.51%	52.32%
Swing	▲0.20%	▲1.94%

Democratic hold
Republican hold
Democratic
40–50%
50–60%
60–70%
70–80%
80–90%
Republican
50–60%
60–70%
70–80%
80–90%
90–100%

The 2004 congressional elections in Tennessee was held on November 2, 2004, to determine who will represent the state of Tennessee in the United States House of Representatives. Following the 2004 elections, no seats changed hands, leaving the Tennessee delegation at a 5-4 Democratic majority.

Tennessee was one of four states in which the party that won the state's popular vote did not win a majority of seats in 2004, the other states being Colorado, Connecticut, and New Mexico.

== Overview ==
United States House of Representatives elections in Tennessee, 2004
Party	Votes	Percentage	Seats	+/–
Democratic	1,031,959	46.51%	5	—
Republican	1,160,821	52.32%	4	—
Independents	25,686	1.16%	0	—
Write-in	272	0.01%	0	—
Totals	2,218,738	100.00%	9	—

Popular vote
Republican	52.32%
Democratic	46.51%
Other	1.17%

House seats
Democratic	55.56%
Republican	44.44%

=== By district ===
District	Incumbent	Party	First elected	Result	Candidates
Tennessee 1	William L. Jenkins	Republican	1996	Incumbent re-elected.	▌ ✓ William L. Jenkins (Republican) 73.9%; ▌Graham Leonard (Democratic) 24.1%; ▌Ralph Ball (Independent) 1.3%; ▌Michael Peavler (Independent) 0.7%
Tennessee 2	Jimmy Duncan Jr.	Republican	1998	Incumbent re-elected.	▌ ✓ Jimmy Duncan Jr. (Republican) 79.1%; ▌John Greene (Democratic) 19.1%; ▌Charles Howard (Independent) 1.8%
Tennessee 3	Zach Wamp	Republican	1994	Incumbent re-elected.	▌ ✓ Zach Wamp (Republican) 64.7%; ▌John Wolfe (Democratic) 32.8%; ▌June Griffin (Independent) 1.2%; ▌Doug Vandagriff (Independent) 0.7%; ▌Jean Howard-Hill (Independent) 0.6%
Tennessee 4	Lincoln Davis	Democratic	2002	Incumbent re-elected.	▌ ✓ Lincoln Davis (Democratic) 54.8%; ▌Janice Bowling (Republican) 43.5%; ▌Ken Martin (Independent) 1.7%
Tennessee 5	Jim Cooper	Democratic	1982 1994 (retired) 2002	Incumbent re-elected.	▌ ✓ Jim Cooper (Democratic) 69.3%; ▌Scott Knapp (Republican) 30.7%
Tennessee 6	Bart Gordon	Democratic	1984	Incumbent re-elected.	▌ ✓ Bart Gordon (Democratic) 64.2%; ▌Nick Demas (Republican) 33.6%; ▌J. Patrick Lyons (Independent) 1.5%; ▌Norman Saliba (Independent) 0.7%
Tennessee 7	Marsha Blackburn	Republican	2002	Incumbent re-elected.	▌ ✓ Marsha Blackburn (Republican) Uncontested
Tennessee 8	John Tanner	Democratic	1988	Incumbent re-elected.	▌ ✓ John Tanner (Democratic) 74.3%; ▌James L. Hart (Republican) 25.6%
Tennessee 9	Harold Ford Jr.	Democratic	1996	Incumbent re-elected.	▌ ✓ Harold Ford Jr. (Democratic) 82.0%; ▌Ruben Fort (Republican) 17.9%

== District 1 ==
2004 Tennessee's 1st congressional district election
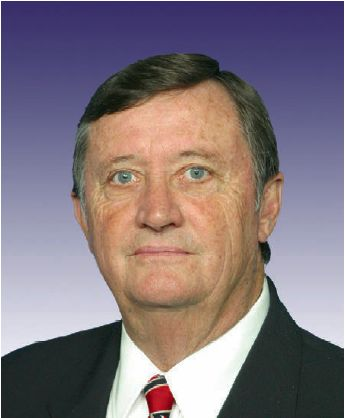

Nominee	Bill Jenkins	Alan Woodruff
Party	Republican	Democratic
Popular vote	172,543	56,361
Percentage	73.88%	24.13%
- County results Jenkins: 70–80% 80–90%
U.S. Representative before election
Bill Jenkins
Republican
Elected U.S. Representative
Bill Jenkins
Republican

Tennessee’s 1st congressional district covered northeast Tennessee, including all of Carter, Cocke, Greene, Hamblen, Hancock, Hawkins, Johnson, Sullivan, Unicoi, and Washington counties and parts of Jefferson County and Sevier County. It has been represented by Republican Bill Jenkins.

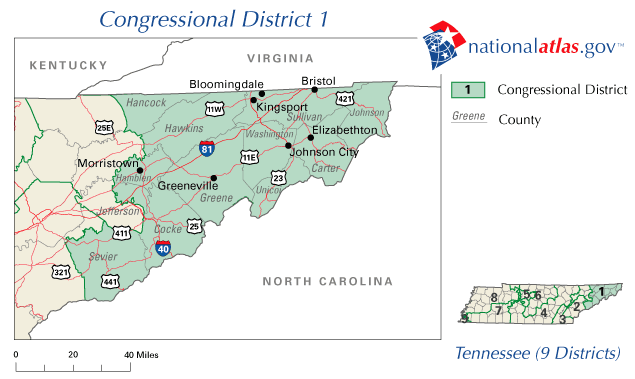

=== Democratic primary ===
- William Malcolm Earp Jr.
- Lewis Hopkins Jr.
- Graham Leonard

Democratic primary results
Party	Candidate	Votes	%
Democratic	William Malcolm Earp Jr.	2,770	26.92%
Democratic	Lewis Hopkins Jr.	2,686	26.10%
Democratic	Graham Leonard	4,834	46.98%
Total votes		10,290	100.00%

=== Republican primary ===
- William L. "Bill" Jenkins
- David R. Smith II

Republican primary results
Party	Candidate	Votes	%
Republican	William L. "Bill" Jenkins	32,726	89.73%
Republican	David R. Smith II	3,747	10.27%
Total votes		36,473	100.00%

=== Predictions ===
Source	Ranking	As of
The Cook Political Report	Safe R	October 29, 2004
Sabato's Crystal Ball	Safe R	November 1, 2004

=== Results ===
Tennessee's 1st congressional district election, 2004
Party	Candidate	Votes	%
Republican	William L. Jenkins (inc.)	172,543	73.88%
Democratic	Graham Leonard	56,361	24.13%
Independent	Ralph J. Ball	3,061	1.31%
Independent	Michael Peavler	1,595	0.68%
Total votes		233,560	100.00%
Republican hold			

== District 2 ==
2004 Tennessee's 2nd congressional district election
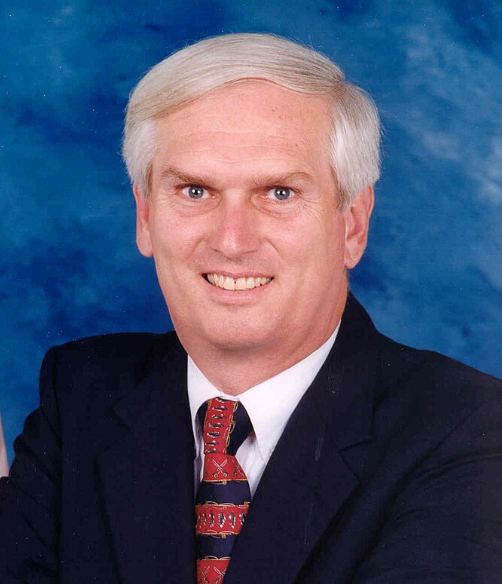

Nominee	Jimmy Duncan	John Greene
Party	Republican	Democratic
Popular vote	215,795	52,155
Percentage	79.07%	19.11%
- County results Duncan: 70–80% 80–90%
U.S. Representative before election
Jimmy Duncan
Republican
Elected U.S. Representative
Jimmy Duncan
Republican

Tennessee’s 2nd congressional district lies in the east-central part of the state, based in Knoxville, and is largely coextensive with that city's metropolitan area. It has been represented by Republican Jimmy Duncan since November 1988. He ran against Democrat Bob Scott. No Democrat has held this seat since 1855.

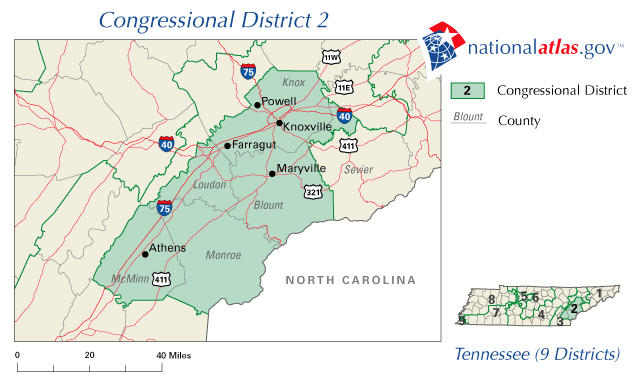

=== Democratic primary ===
- John Greene
- Robert R. (Bob) Scott

Democratic primary results
Party	Candidate	Votes	%
Democratic	John Greene	6,169	51.62%
Democratic	Robert R. (Bob) Scott	5,782	48.38%
Total votes		11,951	100.00%

=== Republican primary ===
- John J. Duncan Jr.
- Debbie Jones Howard

Republican primary results
Party	Candidate	Votes	%
Republican	John J. Duncan Jr.	41,362	91.46%
Republican	Debbie Jones Howard	3,861	8.54%
Total votes		45,223	100.00%

=== Predictions ===
Source	Ranking	As of
The Cook Political Report	Safe R	October 29, 2004
Sabato's Crystal Ball	Safe R	November 1, 2004

=== Results ===
Tennessee's 2nd congressional district election, 2004
Party	Candidate	Votes	%
Republican	Jimmy Duncan Jr. (inc.)	215,795	79.07%
Democratic	John Greene	52,155	19.11%
Independent	Charles E. Howard	4,978	1.82%
Total votes		272,928	100.00%
Republican hold			

== District 3 ==
2004 Tennessee's 3rd congressional district election
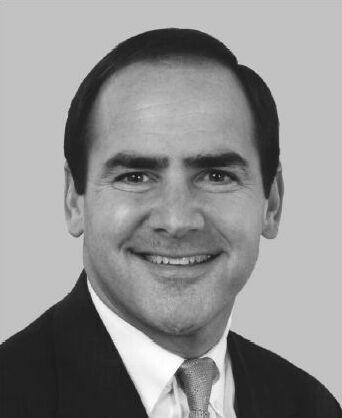

Nominee	Zach Wamp	John Greene
Party	Republican	Democratic
Popular vote	166,154	84,295
Percentage	64.74%	32.85%
- County results Wamp: 50–60% 60–70% 70–80%
U.S. Representative before election
Zach Wamp
Republican
Elected U.S. Representative
Zach Wamp
Republican

Tennessee’s 3rd congressional district, which stretches from the Chattanooga metropolitan area in southern Tennessee to Claiborne County in northern Tennessee, is strongly conservative and has been represented by Republican Congressman Zach Wamp since his initial 1994 election.

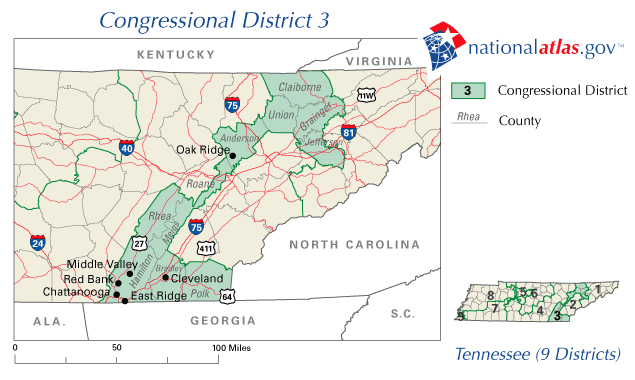

=== Democratic primary ===
- Betty F. Williamson
- John Wolfe

Democratic primary results
Party	Candidate	Votes	%
Democratic	Betty F. Williamson	10,037	40.47%
Democratic	John Wolfe	14,766	59.53%
Total votes		24,803	100.00%

=== Republican primary ===
- Timothy A. Sevier
- Zach Wamp

Republican primary results
Party	Candidate	Votes	%
Republican	Timothy A. Sevier	3,334	9.95%
Republican	Zach Wamp	30,183	90.05%
Total votes		33,517	100.00%

=== Predictions ===
Source	Ranking	As of
The Cook Political Report	Safe R	October 29, 2004
Sabato's Crystal Ball	Safe R	November 1, 2004

=== Results ===
Tennessee's 3rd congressional district election, 2004
Party	Candidate	Votes	%
Republican	Zach Wamp (inc.)	166,154	64.74%
Democratic	John Wolfe	84,295	32.85%
Independent	June Griffin	3,018	1.18%
Independent	Doug Vandagriff	1,696	0.66%
Independent	Jean Howard-Hill	1,473	0.57%
Total votes		256,636	100.00%
Republican hold			

== District 4 ==
2004 Tennessee's 4th congressional district election
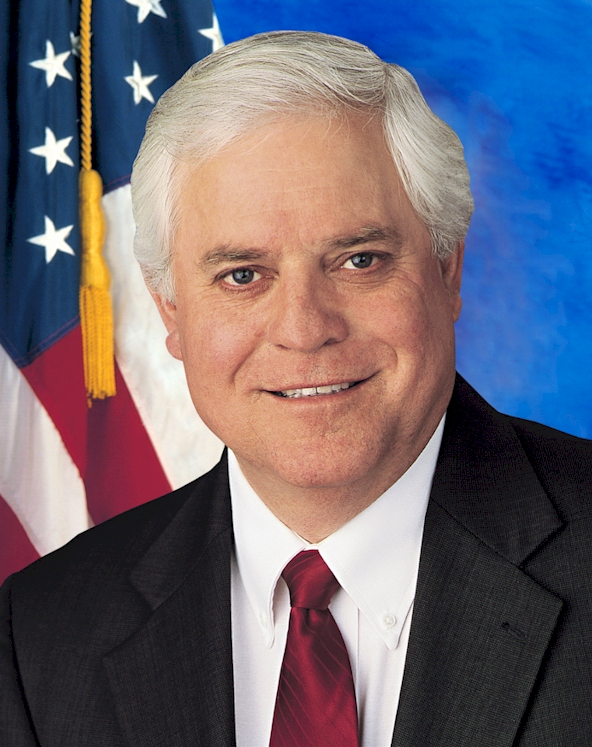

Nominee	Lincoln Davis	Janice Bowling
Party	Democratic	Republican
Popular vote	138.459	109,993
Percentage	54.80%	43.54%
- County results Davis: 40–50% 50–60% 60–70% Bowling: 50–60%
U.S. Representative before election
Lincoln Davis
Democratic
Elected U.S. Representative
Lincoln Davis
Democratic

This district lies in Middle and East Tennessee and includes all of Bledsoe, Campbell, Coffee, Cumberland, Fentress, Franklin, Giles, Grundy, Lawrence, Lewis, Lincoln, Marion, Maury, Moore, Morgan, Pickett, Scott, Sequatchie, Van Buren, Warren, and White Counties, as well as portions of Hickman, Roane, and Williamson counties. It has been represented by Democrat Lincoln Davis since 2003.

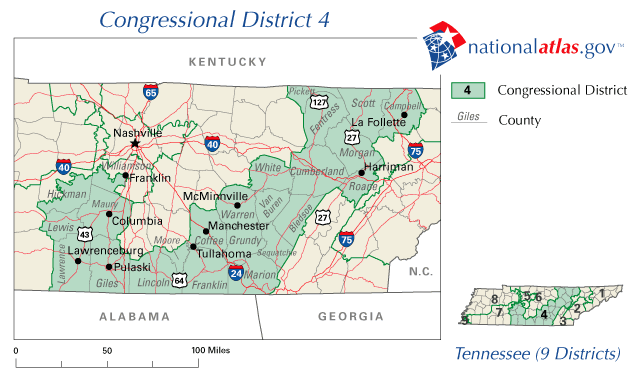

=== Democratic primary ===
- Lincoln Davis
- Harvey Howard

Democratic primary results
Party	Candidate	Votes	%
Democratic	Lincoln Davis	36,462	91.39%
Democratic	Harvey Howard	3,435	8.61%
Total votes		39,897	100.00%

=== Republican primary ===
- Janice Bowling
- Don Cuva
- Dale Harvey

Republican primary results
Party	Candidate	Votes	%
Republican	Janice Bowling	19,246	86.92%
Republican	Dale Harvey	2,431	10.98%
Republican	Don Cuva	465	2.10%
Total votes		22,142	100.00%

=== Predictions ===
Source	Ranking	As of
The Cook Political Report	Likely D	October 29, 2004
Sabato's Crystal Ball	Safe D	November 1, 2004

=== Results ===
Tennessee's 4th congressional district election, 2004
Party	Candidate	Votes	%
Democratic	Lincoln Davis (inc.)	138,459	54.80%
Republican	Janice Bowling	109,993	43.54%
Independent	Ken Martin	4,194	1.66%
Total votes		252,646	100.00%
Democratic hold			

== District 5 ==
2004 Tennessee's 5th congressional district election
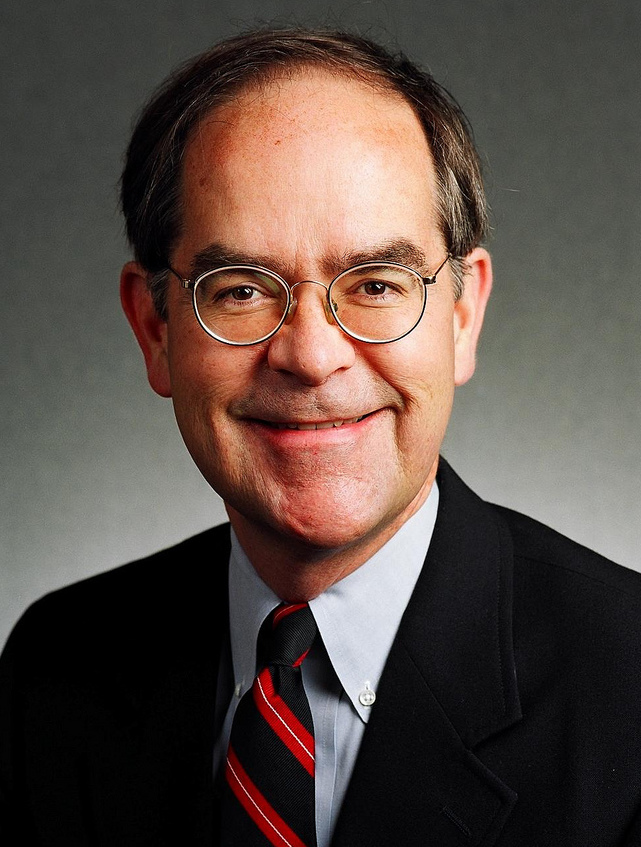

Nominee	Jim Cooper	Scott Knapp
Party	Democratic	Republican
Popular vote	168,970	74,978
Percentage	69.26%	30.73%
- County results Cooper: 50–60% 70–80%
U.S. Representative before election
Jim Cooper
Democratic
Elected U.S. Representative
Jim Cooper
Democratic

Tennessee’s 5th congressional district was centered on Nashville and included portions of the surrounding area. The district was anchored by the majority of Nashville–Davidson County, making Nashville its largest city and primary population center. In addition to Nashville, the district extended into parts of Cheatham County and Wilson County. This included communities such as Ashland City, Pleasant View, and Pegram in Cheatham County, as well as most of Lebanon, as well as Mount Juliet, and Green Hill in Wilson County.

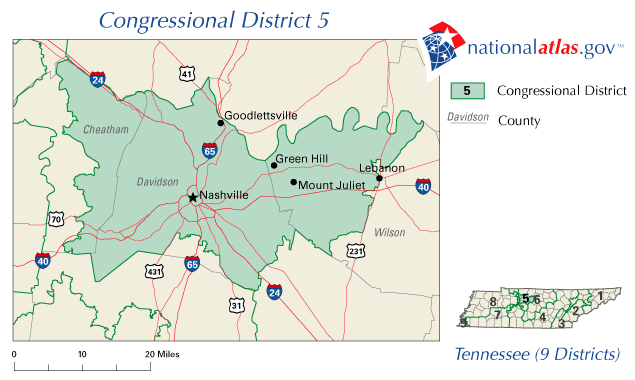

=== Democratic primary ===
- Jim Cooper

Democratic primary results
Party	Candidate	Votes	%
Democratic	Jim Cooper	22,396	100.00%
Total votes		22,396	100.00%

=== Republican primary ===
- Scott Knapp

Republican primary results
Party	Candidate	Votes	%
Republican	Scott Knapp	8,110	100.00%
Total votes		8,110	100.00%

=== Predictions ===
Source	Ranking	As of
The Cook Political Report	Safe D	October 29, 2004
Sabato's Crystal Ball	Safe D	November 1, 2004

=== Results ===
Tennessee's 5th congressional district election, 2004
Party	Candidate	Votes	%
Democratic	Jim Cooper (inc.)	168,970	69.26%
Republican	Scott Knapp	74,978	30.73%
Write-In	Thomas F. Kovach	15	0.01%
Total votes		243,963	100.00%
Democratic hold			

== District 6 ==
2004 Tennessee's 6th congressional district election
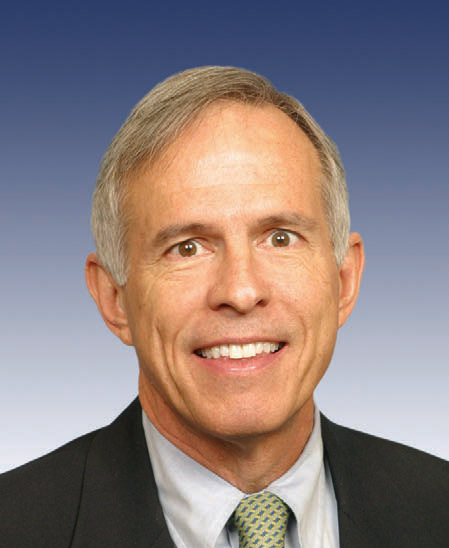

Nominee	Bart Gordon	Nick Demas
Party	Democratic	Republican
Popular vote	167,448	87,523
Percentage	64.24%	33.58%
- County results Gordon: 50–60% 60–70% 70–80%
U.S. Representative before election
Bart Gordon
Democratic
Elected U.S. Representative
Bart Gordon
Democratic

Tennessee’s 6th congressional district lied in Middle Tennessee, including all of Bedford, Cannon, Clay, DeKalb, Jackson, Macon, Marshall, Overton, Putnam, Robertson, Rutherford, Smith, Sumner, and Trousdale Counties, as well as a portion of Wilson County. It had been represented by Democrat Bart Gordon since 1985.

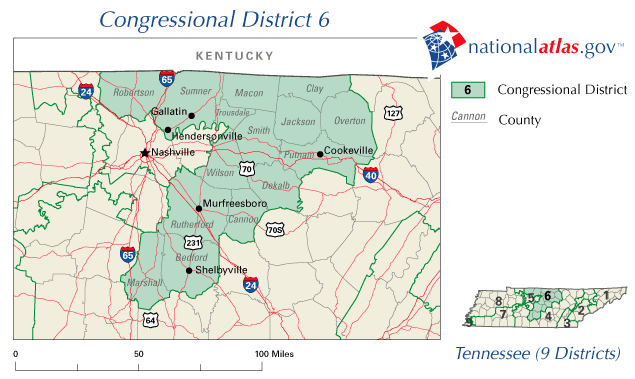

=== Democratic primary ===
- Bart Gordon
- Robert C. Hall

Democratic primary results
Party	Candidate	Votes	%
Democratic	Bart Gordon	28,524	93.25%
Democratic	Robert C. Hall	2,066	6.75%
Total votes		30,590	100.00%

=== Republican primary ===
- Nick Demas
- Elizabeth Hall

Republican primary results
Party	Candidate	Votes	%
Republican	Nick Demas	7,657	51.52%
Republican	Elizabeth Hall	7,205	48.48%
Total votes		14,862	100.00%

=== Predictions ===
Source	Ranking	As of
The Cook Political Report	Safe D	October 29, 2004
Sabato's Crystal Ball	Safe D	November 1, 2004

=== Results ===
Tennessee's 6th congressional district election, 2004
Party	Candidate	Votes	%
Democratic	Bart Gordon (inc.)	167,448	64.24%
Republican	Nick Demas	87,523	33.58%
Independent	J. Patrick Lyons	3,869	1.48%
Independent	Norman R. Saliba	1,802	0.69%
Total votes		260,642	100.00%
Democratic hold			

== District 7 ==
2004 Tennessee's 7th congressional district election
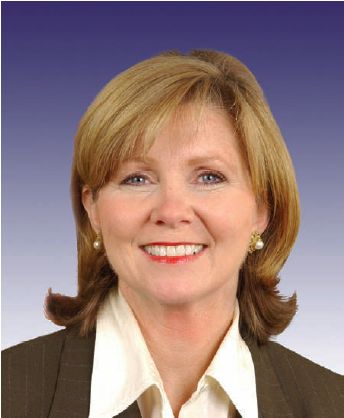
Nominee	Marsha Blackburn
Party	Republican
Popular vote	232,404
Percentage	100.00%
- County results Blackburn: >90%
U.S. Representative before election
Marsha Blackburn
Republican
Elected U.S. Representative
Marsha Blackburn
Republican

Tennessee’s 7th congressional district stretched from portions of Shelby County in West Tennessee through parts of Middle Tennessee which included the majority of Williamson County and a part of southern suburban Nashville and northward to include Clarksville in Montgomery County, resulting in an unusually long and narrow configuration that combined distant suburban and rural areas into a single congressional district.

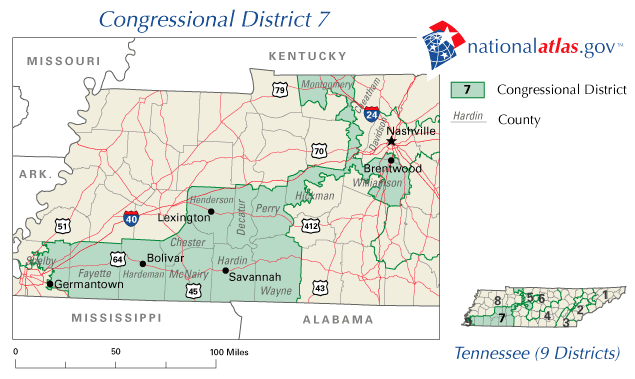

=== Democratic primary ===
No Democratic primary was held.

=== Republican primary ===
- Marsha Blackburn

Republican primary results
Party	Candidate	Votes	%
Republican	Marsha Blackburn	24,233	100.00%
Total votes		24,233	100.00%

=== Predictions ===
Source	Ranking	As of
The Cook Political Report	Safe R	October 29, 2004
Sabato's Crystal Ball	Safe R	November 1, 2004

=== Results ===
Tennessee's 7th congressional district election, 2004
Party	Candidate	Votes	%
Republican	Marsha Blackburn (inc.)	232,404	100.00%
Total votes		232,404	100.00%
Republican hold			

== District 8 ==
2004 Tennessee's 8th congressional district election
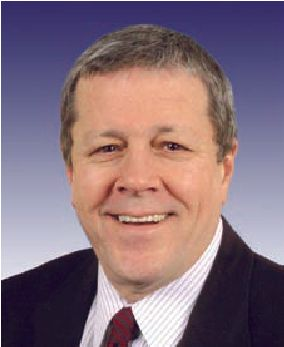

Nominee	John Tanner	James L. Hart
Party	Democratic	Republican
Popular vote	173,623	59,853
Percentage	74.34%	25.63%
- County results Tanner: 50–60% 60–70% 70–80% 80–90%
U.S. Representative before election
John S. Tanner
Democratic
Elected U.S. Representative
John S. Tanner
Democratic

Tennessee’s 8th congressional district, a Republican-leaning district, rooted in the northwestern portion of the state, had been represented by moderate Democratic Congressman John Tanner since 1989.

Republican nominee James L. Hart, a white supremacist and segregationist activist, faced controversy. As the only candidate on the primary ballot (facing only a write-in campaign), he won the Republican nomination, despite listing an out-of-state address in candidate filings. The state Republican Party disavowed his candidacy, describing his views on race as "abhorrent and outrageous" and urging "all Republicans and Tennesseans to reject the candidacy of James Hart wholly and unequivocally." Hart lost to incumbent Democrat John Tanner, receiving 25.6% of the vote.

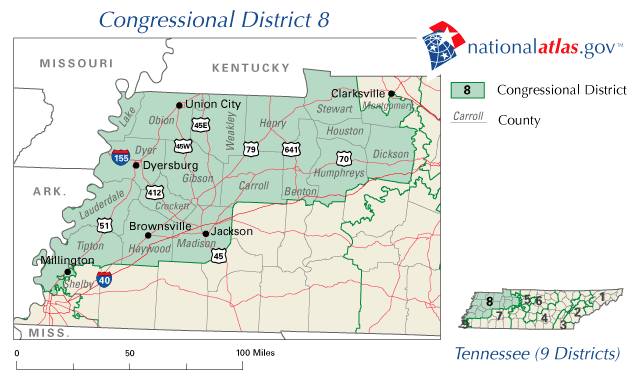

=== Democratic primary ===
- John Tanner

Democratic primary results
Party	Candidate	Votes	%
Democratic	John Tanner	28,427	100.00%
Total votes		28,427	100.00%

=== Republican primary ===
- James L. Hart, a white supremacist, segregationist activist and political candidate in Buchanan, Tennessee
- Dennis K. Bertrand (write-in)

Republican primary results
Party	Candidate	Votes	%
Republican	James L. Hart	8,227	78.50%
Republican	Dennis K. Bertrand	2,253	21.50%
Total votes		10,480	100.00%

=== Predictions ===
Source	Ranking	As of
The Cook Political Report	Safe D	October 29, 2004
Sabato's Crystal Ball	Safe D	November 1, 2004

=== Results ===
Tennessee's 8th congressional district election, 2004
Party	Candidate	Votes	%
Democratic	John Tanner (inc.)	173,623	74.34%
Republican	James L. Hart	59,853	25.63%
Write-In	Dennis Bertrand	91	0.04%
Total votes		233,567	100.00%
Democratic hold			

== District 9 ==
2004 Tennessee's 9th congressional district election
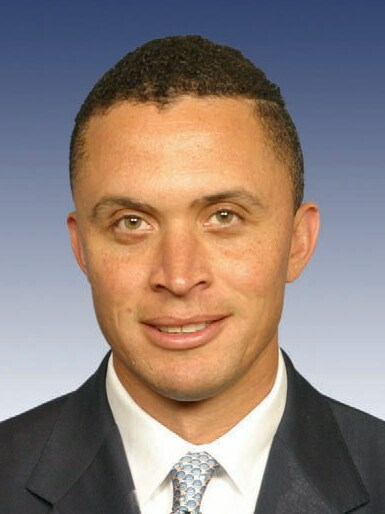

Nominee	Harold Ford Jr.	Ruben M. Fort
Party	Democratic	Republican
Popular vote	190,648	41,578
Percentage	82.04%	17.89%
- County results Ford: 80–90%
U.S. Representative before election
Harold Ford Jr.
Democratic
Elected U.S. Representative
Harold Ford Jr.
Democratic

Tennessee’s 9th congressional district, based exclusively within the city of Memphis, has the distinction of being the state's most liberal district, the only district contained within one county, and Tennessee's only African-American majority district. Incumbent Democratic Congressman Harold Ford, Jr. had represented this district since his initial 1996 election.

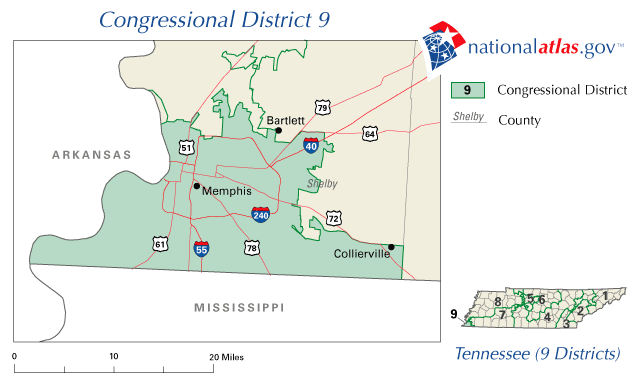

=== Democratic primary ===
- Harold Ford Jr.

Democratic primary results
Party	Candidate	Votes	%
Democratic	Harold Ford Jr.	33,708	100.00%
Total votes		33,708	100.00%

=== Republican primary ===
- Ruben M. Fort

Republican primary results
Party	Candidate	Votes	%
Republican	Ruben M. Fort	12,532	100.00%
Total votes		12,532	100.00%

=== Predictions ===
Source	Ranking	As of
The Cook Political Report	Safe D	October 29, 2004
Sabato's Crystal Ball	Safe D	November 1, 2004

=== Results ===
Tennessee's 9th congressional district election, 2004
Party	Candidate	Votes	%
Democratic	Harold Ford Jr. (inc.)	190,648	82.04%
Republican	Ruben M. Fort	41,578	17.89%
Write-In	Jim Maynard	166	0.07%
Total votes		232,392	100.00%
Democratic hold			

== See also ==
- 2004 United States presidential election in Tennessee
- 2004 Tennessee elections
- 2004 United States elections
