= Scott Knapp =

American basketball player and coach

- Born: August 30, 1978 (age 47)
- Occupations: basketball player, basketball head coach

Scott Knapp (born August 30, 1978) is an American former basketball player from Sherrill, New York. He was the head coach of the Schenectady Legends of the Independent Basketball Association (IBA).

== College career ==
As a player, he played at NCAA Division I Siena College in Loudonville, NY where he played point guard and shooting guard and was named a co-captain at the start of his senior season. Known as a tremendous shooter, Knapp finished with 1,381 career points and is the all time 3-point shot leader (293) and has the all-time record for highest free throw percentage (89.1%) in Siena Saints history. In the 1997–1998 season Knapp won MAAC rookie of the year honors averaging 12.3 Points per game for the Saints. He was twice named to the MAAC all tournament team and once a second team all conference award winner. Under his leadership on the court, Siena advanced to the NCAA Tournament in 1999 and the NIT in 2000.

== Pro career ==
After graduating from Siena College, Scott played basketball professionally in the Continental Basketball Association (Rockford Lightning) and the USBL (Adirondack Wildcats). As a professional, Scott was named CBA All Rookie Team Honorable Mention in 2002.

== Coaching career ==
In August 2014, Knapp was named the head coach of the Schenectady Legends Professional Basketball team in the IBA. He led the team to an undefeated season (13–0) and was named Coach of the Year after winning the league championship versus the Kenosha (WI) Ballers.

== Head coaching record ==
=== IBA ===
Legend
Regular season	G	Games coached	W	Games won	L	Games lost	W–L %	Win–loss %
Playoffs	PG	Playoff games	PW	Playoff wins	PL	Playoff losses	PW–L %	Playoff win–loss %

Team	Year	G	W	L	W–L%	Finish	PG	PW	PL	PW–L%	Result
Schenectady Legends	2014	11	11	0	1.000	1st in IBA	2	2	0	1.000	Won IBA Finals
Career Total		11	11	0	1.000		2	2	0	1.000	1 Championship
