= Rockford Riverdawgs =

- Founded: 2011
- League: IBA (2011–2014)
- Team history: Rockford Riverdawgs (2011–2014)
- Based in: Rockford, Illinois
- Colors: Purple, black, gold
- Championships: 0

The Rockford Riverdawgs were a semi-professional basketball team that competed in the Independent Basketball Association (IBA).

== History ==
The Riverdawgs played their first two IBA seasons at the Clinton Sports Complex in Loves Park. For the 2013–14 season, the team moved its home games to the Patriots' Gateway Center in Rockford.

By January 2013, Riverdawgs player Kwan Waller was averaging 39 points per game with the team.

The Riverdawgs went on hiatus after the 2013–14 season.

== Season results ==
Year	Wins	Losses	Finish	Playoffs
2011-12	11	7	2nd	
2012-13	8	9	5th	DNQ
2013-14	10	6	4th	Semifinals
