= St. Louis Trotters =

- Founded: 1970
- League: IBA (2012–2017)
- Based in: Saint Louis, Missouri
- Arena: Mathews-Dickey Boy's & Girl's Club
- Owner: Milan Pepper
- Head coach: Harold Webster
- Championships: Two (Spring 2015, Spring 2017)

The St. Louis Trotters are a semi-professional basketball team who compete in the Independent Basketball Association (IBA). The franchise has history as far back as the 1970s. The Trotters joined the IBA for the 2012–13 season and have won two championships - one during the Spring 2015 season and the other in Spring 2017).

Notable former players include: Anthony Bonner (Sacramento Kings), Shawn Bush, Shotgun Campbell, Cornell Nelly Haynes, Dink Jones, Ken Kaid, Randy Reed (St. Louis Community College), David Thurkil, Ramon Trice (St. Louis Billikens), Shawn Tunstall (Kansas Jayhawks) and Rob Wallace.

== Season-by-season results ==
| Season | Wins | Losses | Finish | Playoffs |
|---|---|---|---|---|
| 2012-13 Fall | 8 | 8 | 4th | DNQ |
| 2013-14 Fall | 13 | 3 | 1st | 1-1 Runner-up to Kankakee County Soldiers |
| 2014 Spring | 7 | 4 | 2nd | 1-1 Semifinals- lost to Markham City Racers |
| 2014-15 Fall | 10 | 1 | 2nd | 0-1 Semifinals- lost to Kenosha Ballers |
| 2015 Spring | 6 | 2 | 2nd | 2-0 Champions- defeated Kankakee County Soldiers |
| 2015 Fall | 4 | 5 | 3rd | 1-1 Runner-up to Kankakee County Soldiers |
| Total | 48 | 23 | -- | one championship |

== See also ==
- St. Louis Swarm
