= 2004 United States House of Representatives elections in Connecticut =

- November 2, 2004

All 5 Connecticut seats to the United States House of Representatives
	Majority party	Minority party
Party	Republican	Democratic
Last election	3	2
Seats won	3	2
Seat change	Steady	Steady
Popular vote	629,934	785,747
Percentage	44.09%	55.00%

Republican
40–50%
50–60%
60–70%
70–80%
Democratic
40–50%
50–60%
60–70%
70–80%
80–90%

The 2004 United States House of Representatives elections in Connecticut were held on November 2, 2004, to elect the five members of the U.S. House, one from each of the state's congressional districts, to represent Connecticut in the 109th Congress. The elections coincided with the Presidential election and a U.S. Senate election, as well as with Congressional elections in other states.

No seats changed partisan control. The Republicans held on to their majority of districts in Connecticut. This is the last time Republicans had a majority of congressional districts in Connecticut.

Connecticut was one of four states in which the party that won the state's popular vote did not win a majority of seats in 2004, the other states being Colorado, New Mexico, and Tennessee.

== Overview ==
United States House of Representatives elections in Connecticut, 2004
Party	Votes	Percentage	Seats	+/–
Democratic	785,747	55.00%	2	0
Republican	629,934	44.09%	3	0
Green	9,564	0.01%	0	0
Working Families	5,741	<0.01%	0	0
Write-in candidates	134	<0.01%	0	0
Totals	1,428,738	100.00%	5	—

== District 1 ==
2004 Connecticut's 1st congressional district election
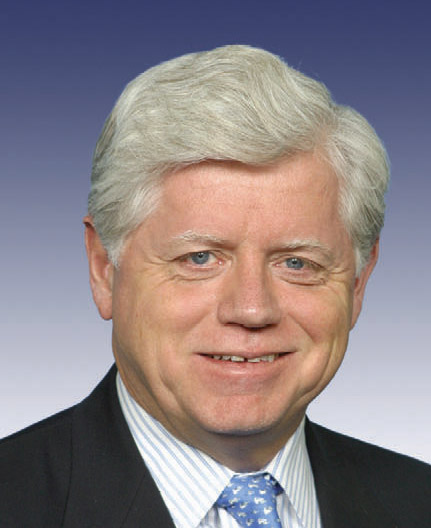

Nominee	John B. Larson	John Halstead
Party	Democratic	Republican
Popular vote	198,802	73,601
Percentage	73.0%	25.5%
- Municipality results Larson: 50–60% 60–70% 70–80% 80–90% Halstead: 50–60%
U.S. Representative before election
John B. Larson
Democratic
Elected U.S. Representative
John B. Larson
Democratic

3 term incumbent, Democrat John Larson faced Republican challenger John Halstead in the election; Larson was re-elected to a fourth term with 72.98 percent of the vote.

=== Predictions ===
Source	Ranking	As of
The Cook Political Report	Safe D	October 29, 2004
Sabato's Crystal Ball	Safe D	November 1, 2004

Results

Connecticut's First Congressional District election, 2004
Party	Candidate	Votes	%
Democratic	John Larson (incumbent)	198,802	72.98
Republican	John Halstead	73,601	25.54
Total votes		272,403	100
Democratic hold			

== District 2 ==
2004 Connecticut's 2nd congressional district election
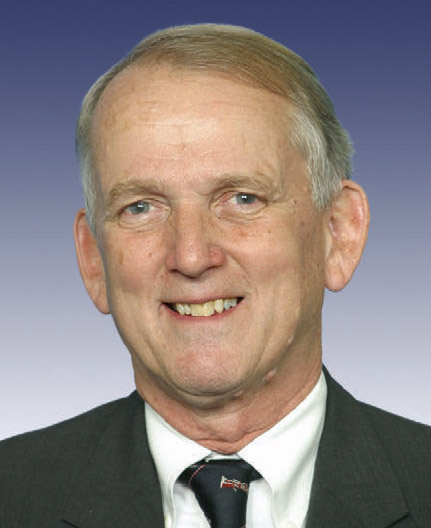

Nominee	Rob Simmons	Jim Sullivan
Party	Republican	Democratic
Popular vote	166,412	140,536
Percentage	54.2%	45.7%
- Municipality results Simmons: 50–60% 60–70% Sullivan: 50–60% 60–70%
U.S. Representative before election
Rob Simmons
Republican
Elected U.S. Representative
Rob Simmons
Republican

Incumbent Republican Rob Simmons went up against Democratic nominee Jim Sullivan. Simmons won re-election to a third term with 54.19% of the vote and a margin of 8.43%.

=== Predictions ===
Source	Ranking	As of
The Cook Political Report	Tossup	October 29, 2004
Sabato's Crystal Ball	Safe R	November 1, 2004

Results

Connecticut's Second Congressional District election, 2004
Party	Candidate	Votes	%
Republican	Rob Simmons (incumbent)	166,412	54.19
Democratic	Jim Sullivan	140,536	45.76
Write-In	David R. Lyon	130	0.05
Total votes		307,078	100
Republican hold			

== District 3 ==
2004 Connecticut's 3rd congressional district election
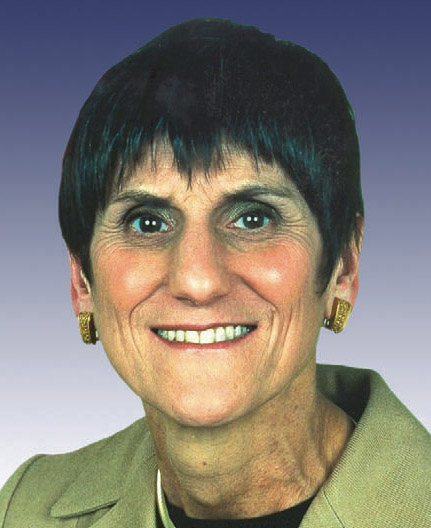

Nominee	Rosa DeLauro	Angel Cadena
Party	Democratic	Republican
Popular vote	200,638	69,160
Percentage	72.4%	25.0%
- Municipality results DeLauro: 50–60% 60–70% 70–80% 80–90%
U.S. Representative before election
Rosa DeLauro
Democratic
Elected U.S. Representative
Rosa DeLauro
Democratic

Incumbent Democrat Rosa DeLauro faced Republican challenger Richter Elser, in the election; DeLauro was re-elected in a landslide margin of 47.47%.

=== Predictions ===
Source	Ranking	As of
The Cook Political Report	Safe D	October 29, 2004
Sabato's Crystal Ball	Safe D	November 1, 2004

Results

Connecticut's Third Congressional District election, 2004
Party	Candidate	Votes	%
Democratic	Rosa DeLauro (incumbent)	200,638	72.44
Republican	Richter Elser	69,160	24.97
Green	Ralph Ferucci,	7,182	2.59
Total votes		276,980	100
Democratic hold			

== District 4 ==
2004 Connecticut's 4th congressional district election
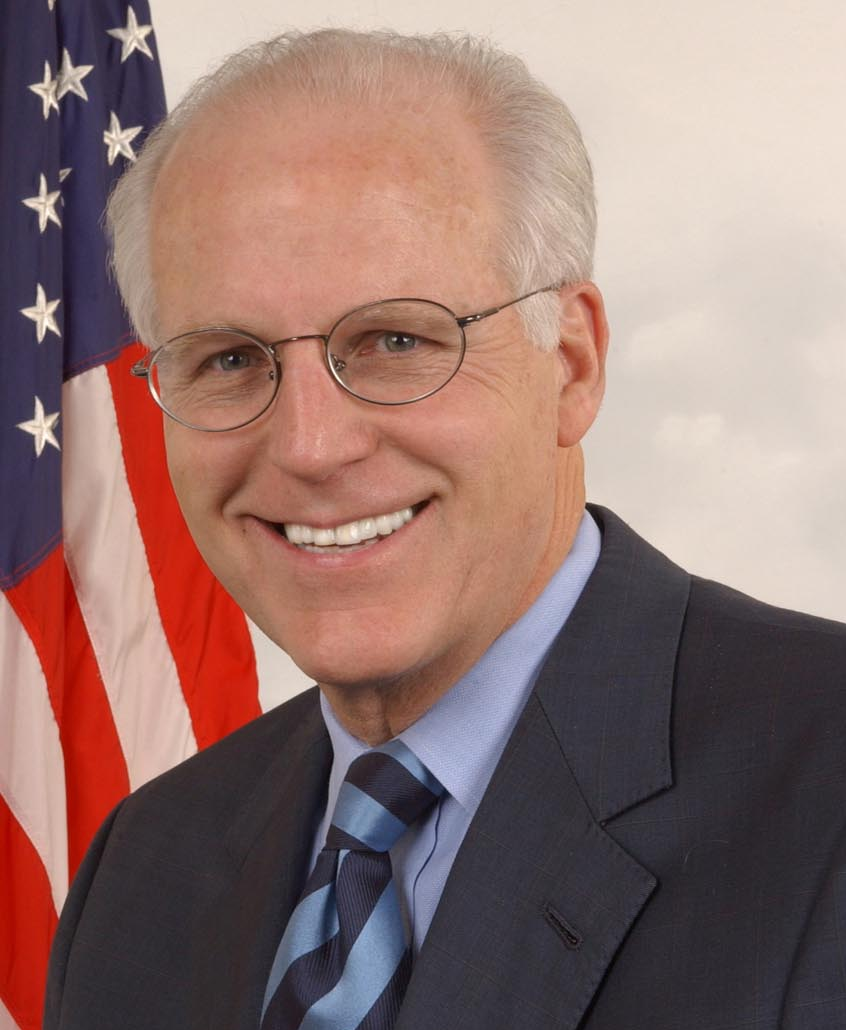

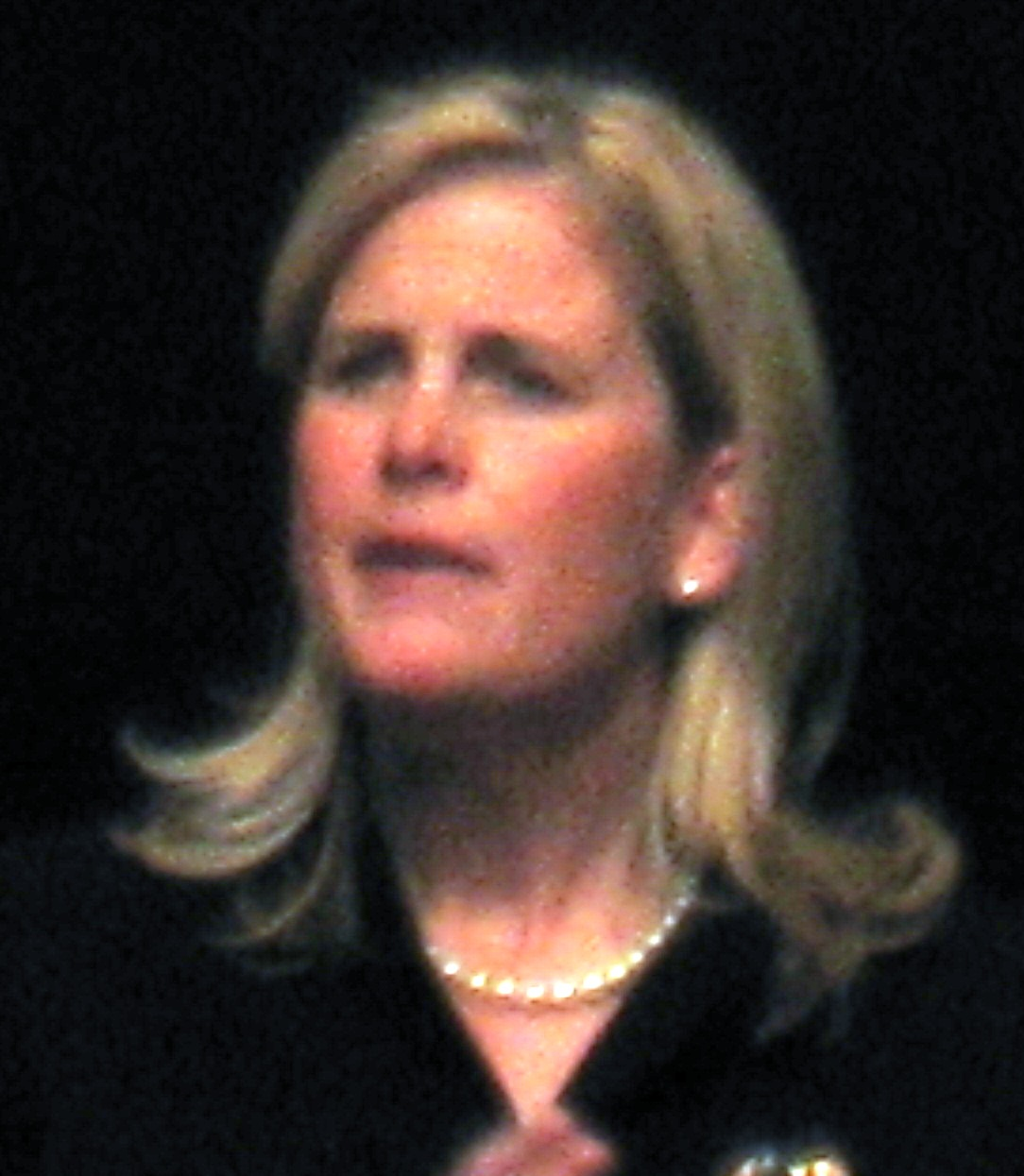
Nominee	Chris Shays	Diane Farrell
Party	Republican	Democratic
Popular vote	152,493	138,333
Percentage	52.4%	47.6%
- Municipality results Shays: 50–60% 60–70% 70–80% Farrell: 50–60% 70–80%
U.S. Representative before election
Chris Shays
Republican
Elected U.S. Representative
Chris Shays
Republican

Incumbent Republican Christopher Shays faced Democratic challenger Diane Farrell in the election; Shays was re-elected with 52.43 percent of the vote.

=== Predictions ===
Source	Ranking	As of
The Cook Political Report	Tossup	October 29, 2004
Sabato's Crystal Ball	Safe R	November 1, 2004

Results

Connecticut's Fourth Congressional District election 2004
Party	Candidate	Votes	%
Republican	Christopher Shays (incumbent)	152,493	52.43
Democratic	Diane Farrell	138,333	47.56
Write-In	Carl E. Vassar	4	0.01
Total votes		290,830	100
Republican hold			

== District 5 ==
2004 Connecticut's 5th congressional district election
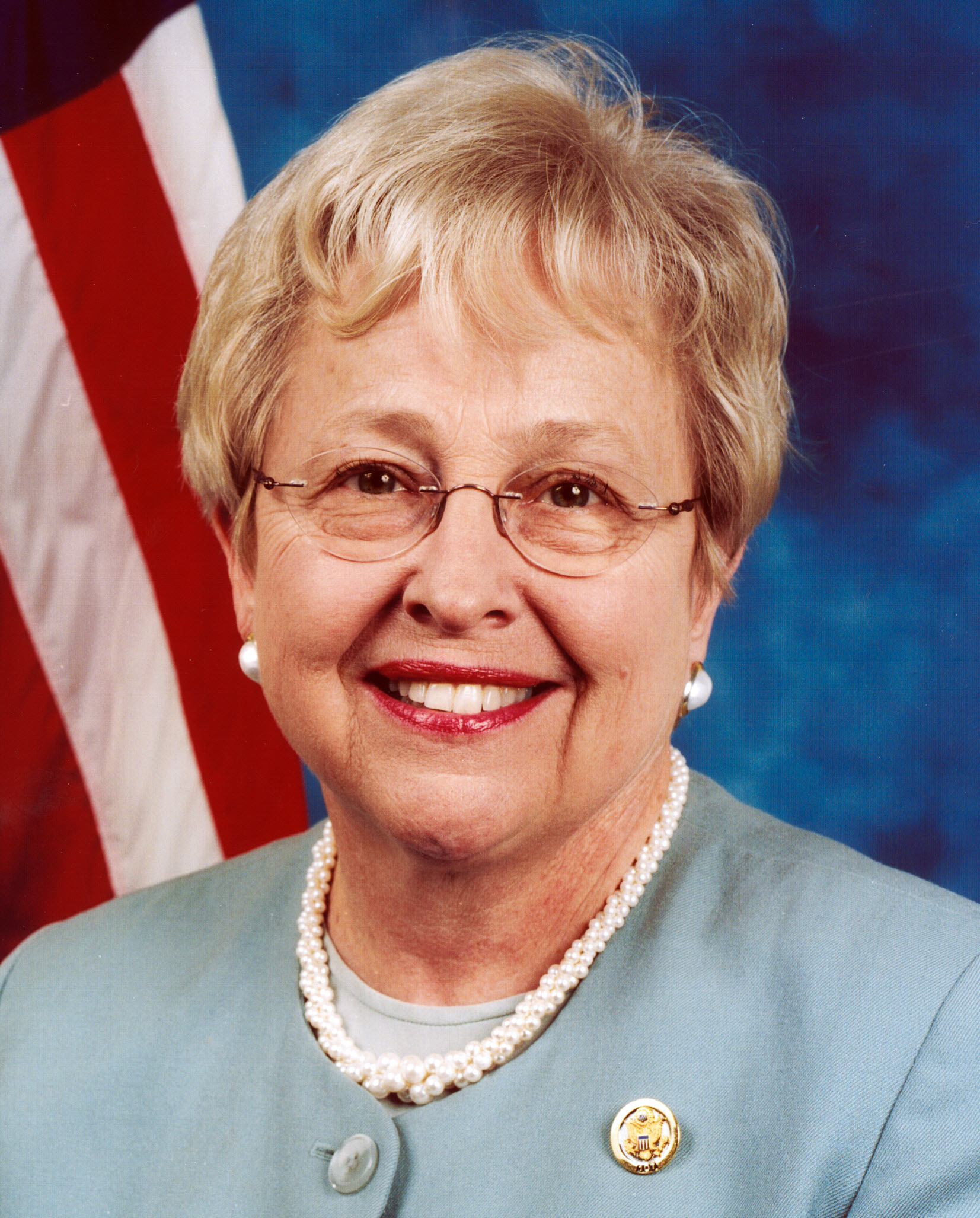

Nominee	Nancy L. Johnson	Theresa B. Gerratana
Party	Republican	Democratic
Popular vote	168,268	107,403
Percentage	59.8%	38.2%
- Municipality results Johnson: 40–50% 50–60% 60–70% Gerratana: 50–60%
U.S. Representative before election
Nancy L. Johnson
Republican
Elected U.S. Representative
Nancy L. Johnson
Republican

Incumbent Republican Nancy L. Johnson faced Democratic challenger Theresa B. Gerratana, Nancy L. Johnson defeated the Gerratana with 59.79% of the vote.

=== Predictions ===
Source	Ranking	As of
The Cook Political Report	Safe R	October 29, 2004
Sabato's Crystal Ball	Safe R	November 1, 2004

Results

Connecticut's Fifth Congressional District election, 2004
Party	Candidate	Votes	%
Republican	Nancy L. Johnson (incumbent)	168,268	59.79
Democratic	Theresa B. Gerratana	107,403	38.18
Working Families	Wildey J. Moore	5,741	2.03
Total votes		281,447	100
Republican hold			
