= 2004 United States House of Representatives elections in New Mexico =

- November 2, 2004

All 3 New Mexico seats to the United States House of Representatives
| | Majority party | Minority party |
|---|---|---|
| Party | Republican | Democratic |
| Last election | 2 | 1 |
| Seats won | 2 | 1 |
| Seat change | Steady | Steady |
| Popular vote | 357,805 | 384,900 |
| Percentage | 48.16% | 51.81% |

Democratic
50–60%
60–70%
70–80%
80–90%
Republican
50–60%
60–70%
70–80%
80–90%

The 2004 United States House of Representatives elections in New Mexico were held on November 2, 2004, to determine who will represent the state of New Mexico in the United States House of Representatives. New Mexico has three seats in the House, apportioned according to the 2000 United States census. Representatives are elected for two-year terms.

New Mexico was one of four states in which the party that won the state's popular vote did not win a majority of seats in 2004, the other states being Colorado, Connecticut, and Tennessee.

== Overview ==
United States House of Representatives elections in New Mexico, 2004
| Party | Votes | Percentage | Seats | +/– |
|---|---|---|---|---|
| Democratic | 384,900 | 51.81% | 1 | — |
| Republican | 357,805 | 48.16% | 2 | — |
| Independents | 194 | 0.03% | 0 | — |
| Totals | 742,899 | 100.00% | 3 | — |

== District 1 ==
2004 New Mexico's 1st congressional district election
- November 2, 2004
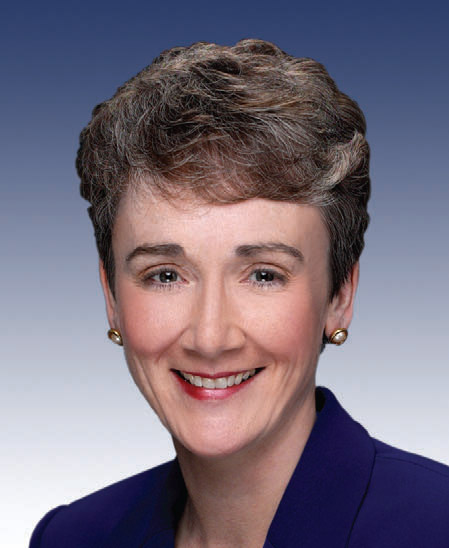

| Nominee | Heather Wilson | Richard Romero |
| Party | Republican | Democratic |
| Popular vote | 147,372 | 123,339 |
| Percentage | 54.40% | 45.53% |
- County results Wilson: 50–60% 60–70% 70–80%
U.S. Representative before election
Heather Wilson
Republican
Elected U.S. Representative
Heather Wilson
Republican

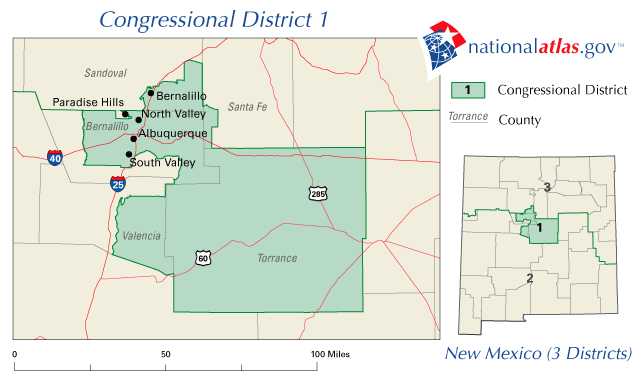

Incumbent Republican Heather Wilson defeated Democrat Richard Romero, the president pro tempore of the New Mexico Senate. This district covers the central part of the state.

=== Democratic primary ===
Democratic primary
| Party | Candidate | Votes | % |
|---|---|---|---|
| Democratic | Richard Romero | 20,632 | 58.28 |
| Democratic | Miles Jay Nelson | 14,768 | 41.72 |
| Total votes | | 35,400 | 100.00 |

=== General election ===
==== Predictions ====
| Source | Ranking | As of |
|---|---|---|
| The Cook Political Report | Tossup | October 29, 2004 |
| Sabato's Crystal Ball | Safe R | November 1, 2004 |

==== Results ====
2004 New Mexico's 1st congressional district election
| Party | Candidate | Votes | % |
|---|---|---|---|
| Republican | Heather Wilson (incumbent) | 147,372 | 54.40 |
| Democratic | Richard Romero | 123,339 | 45.53 |
| Write-in | | 194 | 0.07 |
| Total votes | | 270,905 | 100.00 |
| Republican hold | | | |

== District 2 ==
2004 New Mexico's 2nd congressional district election
- November 2, 2004
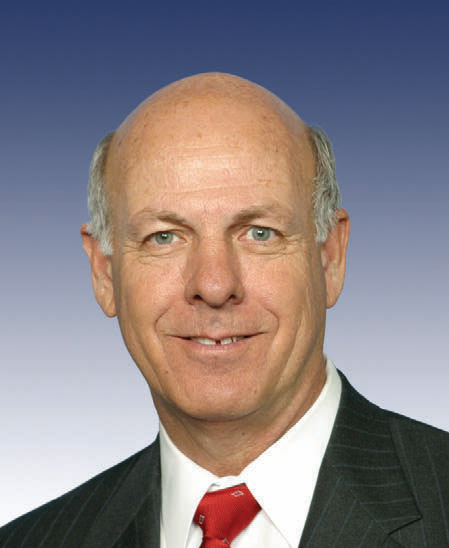

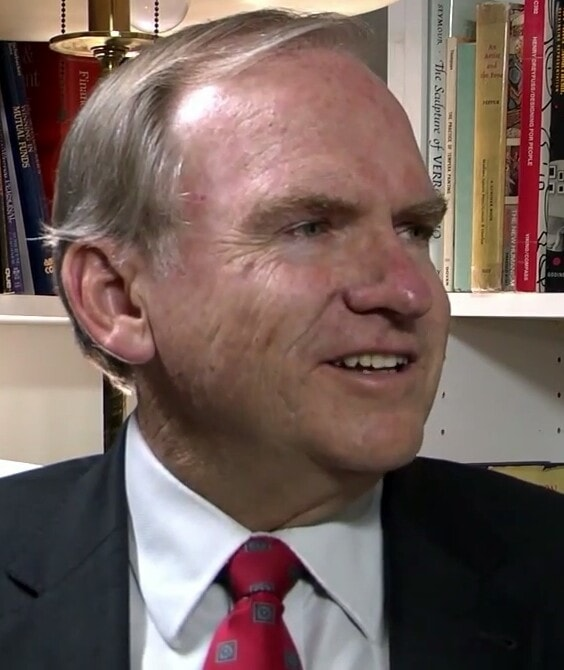
| Nominee | Steve Pearce | Gary King |
| Party | Republican | Democratic |
| Popular vote | 130,498 | 86,292 |
| Percentage | 60.20% | 39.80% |
- County results Pearce: 50–60% 60–70% 70–80% 80–90% King: 50–60% 60–70%
U.S. Representative before election
Steve Pearce
Republican
Elected U.S. Representative
Steve Pearce
Republican

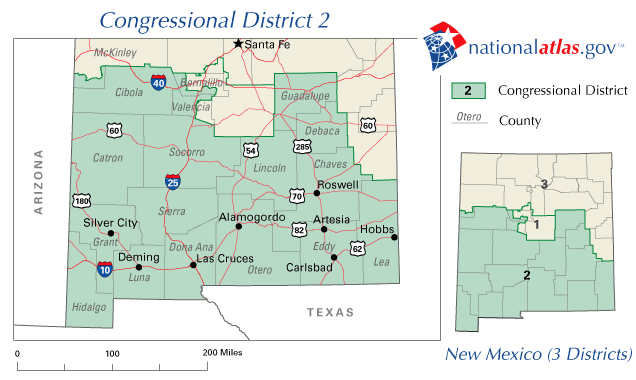

Incumbent Republican Steve Pearce defeated Democrat Gary King, a former state representative. King won the Democratic nomination over Jeff Steinborn, who worked as an aide to Governor Bill Richardson. The district covers the southern part of the state.

=== Democratic primary ===
Democratic primary
| Party | Candidate | Votes | % |
|---|---|---|---|
| Democratic | Gary King | 22,779 | 64.87 |
| Democratic | Jeff Steinborn | 12,335 | 35.13 |
| Total votes | | 35,114 | 100.00 |

=== General election ===
==== Predictions ====
| Source | Ranking | As of |
|---|---|---|
| The Cook Political Report | Likely R | October 29, 2004 |
| Sabato's Crystal Ball | Safe R | November 1, 2004 |

==== Results ====
2004 New Mexico's 2nd congressional district election
| Party | Candidate | Votes | % |
|---|---|---|---|
| Republican | Steve Pearce | 130,498 | 60.20 |
| Democratic | Gary King | 86,292 | 39.80 |
| Total votes | | 216,790 | 100.00 |
| Republican hold | | | |

== District 3 ==
2004 New Mexico's 3rd congressional district election
- November 2, 2004
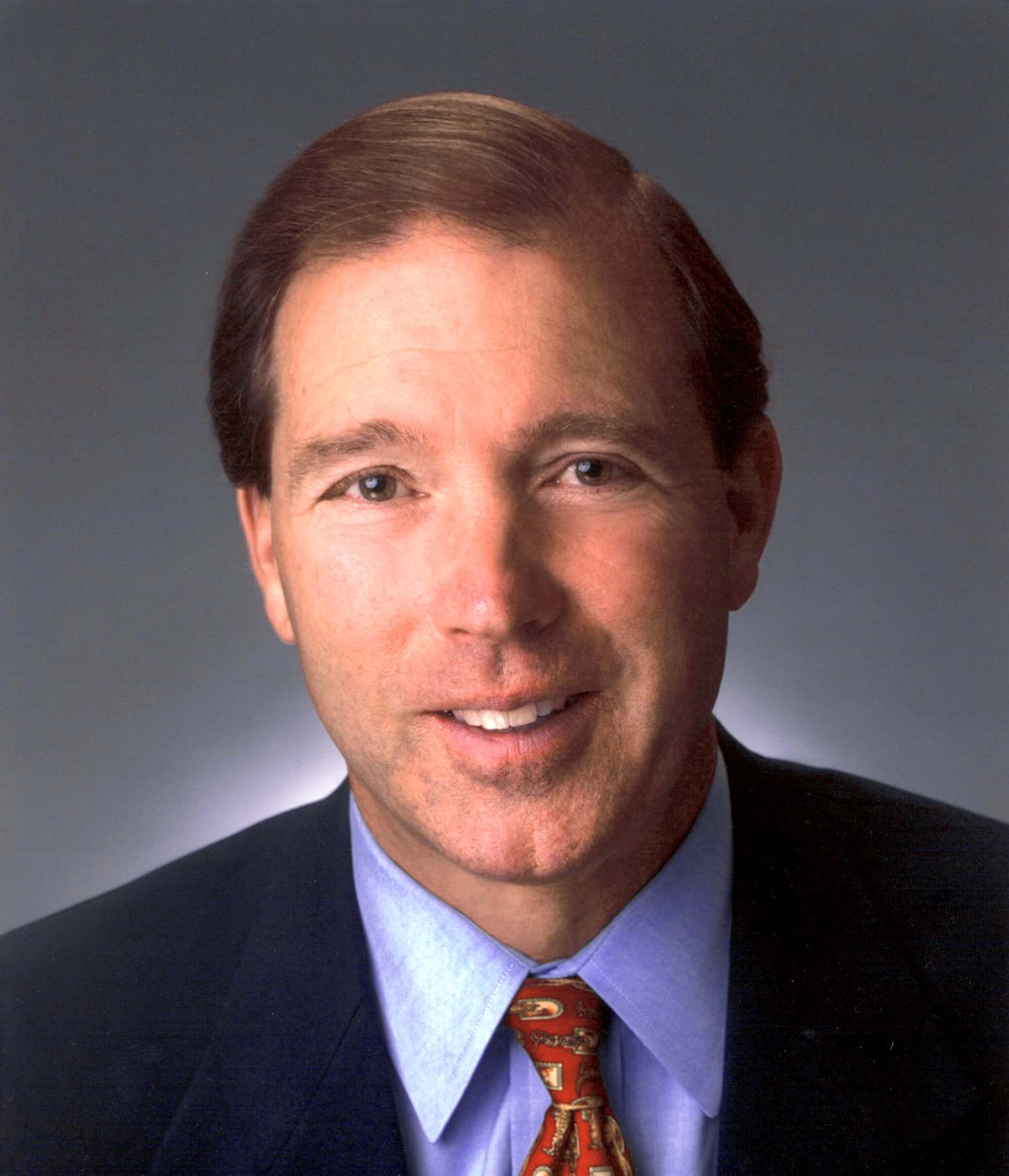

| Nominee | Tom Udall | Gregory M. Tucker |
| Party | Democratic | Republican |
| Popular vote | 175,269 | 79,935 |
| Percentage | 68.68% | 31.32% |
- County results Udall: 50–60% 60–70% 70–80% 80–90% Tucker: 50–60%
U.S. Representative before election
Tom Udall
Democratic
Elected U.S. Representative
Tom Udall
Democratic

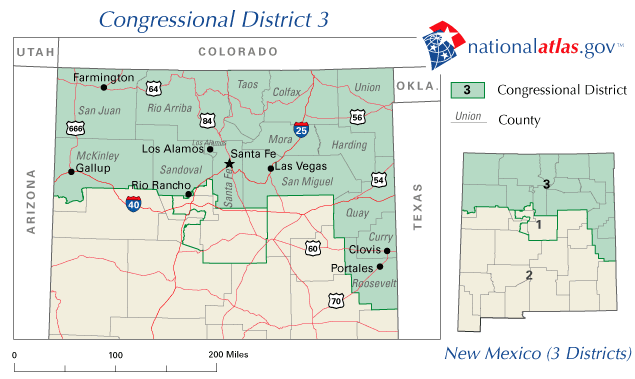

Incumbent Democrat Tom Udall defeated Republican Gregory M. Tucker, a businessman and law professor. The district covers the northern part of the state.

=== General election ===
==== Predictions ====
| Source | Ranking | As of |
|---|---|---|
| The Cook Political Report | Safe D | October 29, 2004 |
| Sabato's Crystal Ball | Safe D | November 1, 2004 |

==== Results ====
2004 New Mexico's 3rd congressional district election
| Party | Candidate | Votes | % |
|---|---|---|---|
| Democratic | Tom Udall (incumbent) | 175,269 | 68.68 |
| Republican | Gregory M. Tucker | 79,935 | 31.32 |
| Total votes | | 255,204 | 100.00 |
| Democratic hold | | | |
