= Kenny Satterfield =

American basketball player (born 1981)

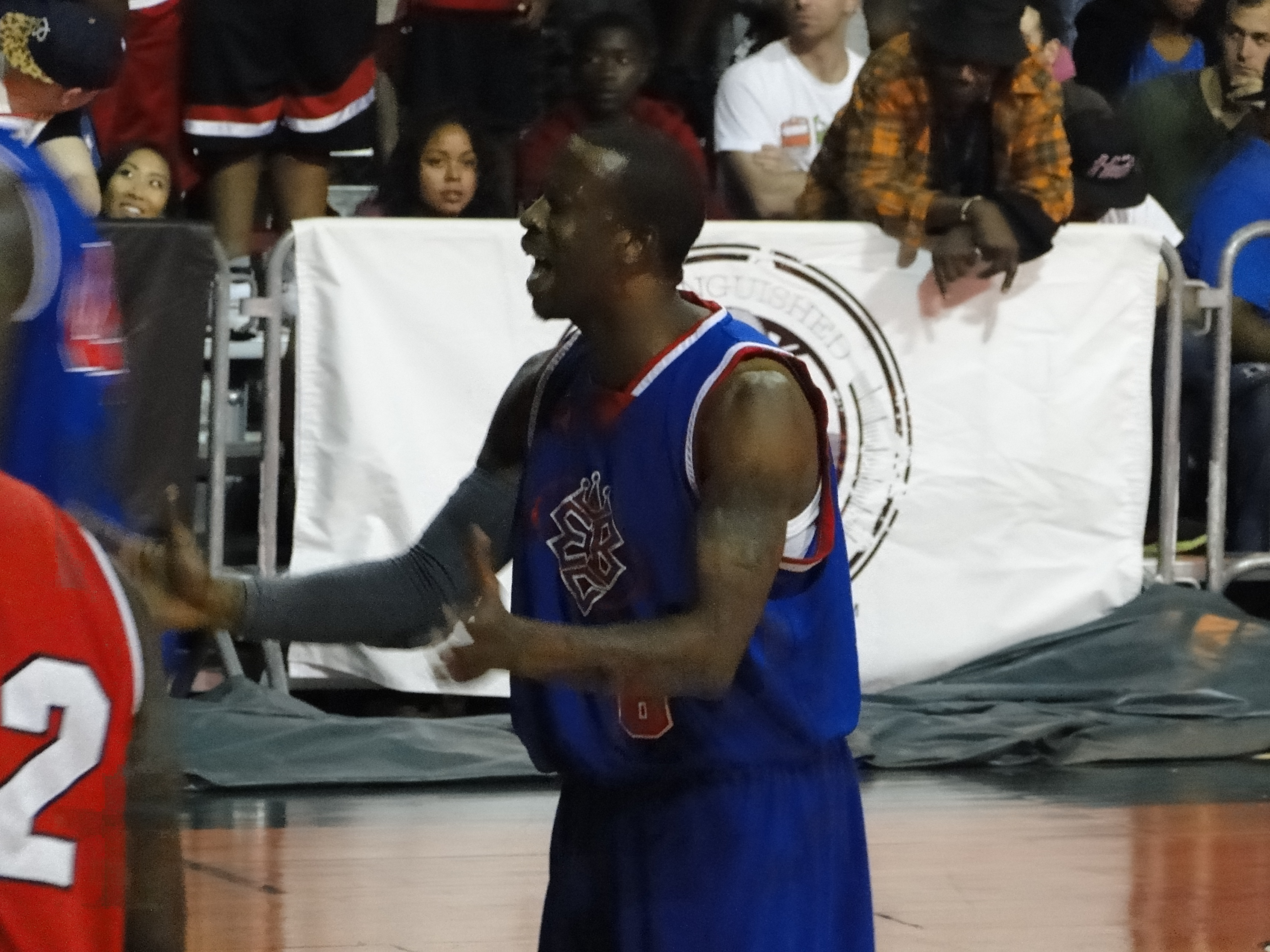

Personal information
- Born: April 10, 1981 (age 45) The Bronx, New York, U.S.
- Listed height: 6 ft 2 in (1.88 m)
- Listed weight: 175 lb (79 kg)

Career information
- High school: Rice (New York City, New York)
- College: Cincinnati (1999–2001)
- NBA draft: 2001: 2nd round, 53rd overall pick
- Drafted by: Dallas Mavericks
- Playing career: 2001–2012
- Position: Point guard
- Number: 11, 12

Career history
- 2001–2002: Denver Nuggets
- 2002–2003: Philadelphia 76ers
- 2003: CSP Limoges
- 2004: Fayetteville Patriots
- 2004: Olympia Larissa
- 2004–2005: Al Hikmeh Sagesse
- 2005: Guaiqueríes de Margarita
- 2005–2006: Al Hikmeh Sagesse
- 2006–2007: Brooklyn Comets
- 2007: San Lazaro
- 2007–2008: Riyadi Beirut
- 2008: Caballeros de Sinaloa
- 2008–2009: Asociacion Quimsa Santiago del Estero
- 2009: Bucaneros de Campeche
- 2009: Ciclista Olimpico de La Banda
- 2010: Albany Legends
- 2010–2011: Saitama Broncos
- 2011: Osaka Evessa
- 2011–2012: Saitama Broncos
- 2012: Gigantes de Guayana

Career highlights
- McDonald's All-American (1999)
- Stats at NBA.com
- Stats at Basketball Reference

Kenneth Alexander Satterfield (born April 10, 1981) is an American former professional basketball player in the National Basketball Association (NBA). He played college basketball for the Cincinnati Bearcats beginning in 1999. In 2001, after a successful sophomore season, he bolted for the NBA, being drafted 53rd overall (second round) by the Dallas Mavericks of the 2001 NBA draft. He played for the Denver Nuggets (2001–2002) and the Philadelphia 76ers (December 2002 – 2003).

During his time with the Nuggets, he coined the nickname "Birdman" for teammate Chris Andersen.

Satterfield posted NBA career averages of 4.3 points, 1.3 rebounds and 2.3 assists in a total of 75 games. Coincidentally, Satterfield's final NBA game ever was also his homecoming game against the Denver Nuggets. After leaving the Nuggets and joining the 76ers, his very first game against Denver at the Pepsi Center (Denver's arena) was on March 2, 2003, which ended up being his last game in the league. Philadelphia won the game 100 - 94 with Satterfield recording 2 assists but no points.

Satterfield a.k.a. "Serious Satellite" is also a well known streetball player on the basketball courts of the New York City summer leagues.

After his NBA venture, Satterfield had a stint with the now defunct NBDL's Fayetteville Patriots. He also played abroad in France, Greece, Venezuela and Lebanon, with Al Hikmeh Sagesse (in 2005–06), which he left in early 2006 without notice, and Riyadi Beirut.

In 2010, he played for the Albany Legends of the IBL. On April 30, 2010, he achieved a triple-double with 13 points, 12 rebounds, and 13 assists in a 100–106 loss to the Tacoma Tide. On May 22, 2010, he put up 31 points and 18 assists in a 142–124 win over the Holland Blast. He finished the season leading the team in points and assists. The Legends went on to win the 2010 IBL Championship.

== Personal life ==
Satterfield was raised in the Castle Hill Houses in Castle Hill, Bronx. Satterfield's daughter Kae Satterfield played basketball collegiately for the Ohio State University, Xavier University, and Seton Hall University.
