= Schenectady Legends =

US basketball team

- Founded: 2010
- League: IBA
- Team history: Albany Legends (2010-14); Schenectady Legends (2014-2017)
- Based in: Schenectady, New York
- Arena: Schenectady YMCA
- Colors: Blue & Yellow
- President: Steve Miller and Bob Hord
- Head coach: Scott Knapp
- Championships: 2 (2010, 2014)

Formed in 2010, the Schenectady Legends were a semi-professional basketball team in the Independent Basketball Association (IBA). The franchise was originally known as the Albany Legends, changing their name in 2014 with a move to Schenectady. They folded in 2017 with the end of the Independent Basketball Association.

As a result of experiences gained while playing with the Legends, more than 80% of alumni and current players, including former NBAers have been promoted to top professional leagues on five continents, including: the NBA D-League (Kyle Cuffe, Springfield Armor 2010), Japan, Denmark, Saudi Arabia, Tunisia, Thailand, Canada, England, Italy, Chile, France and Germany.

Some local capital region players playing abroad include Lloyd Johnson (Lucera, Italy), EJ Gallup (TBB Trier), Evan Lane (Tunisia, Africa), Will Harris (Denmark) and Scotty McRae (Chile and Italy) and Prince Jackson (Italy).

== History ==
The team was established in April 2010 by an independent and locally owned organization, a year after the demise of the Albany Patroons. The team were part of the International Basketball League. The Legends finished off their inaugural season 19-3 and went on to win the IBL 2010 championship.

Albany finished with a 15–7 record in 2011, losing in the IBL semifinals to the Edmonton Energy.

After two seasons in the IBL, the Legends joined the Independent Basketball Association. Albany finished 12–5 in the 2012 spring season, coming up short in the IBA championship game.

In March 2014 the team announced they would be moving to Schenectady County, and compete in the 2014-15 IBA Fall season. The Schenectady Legends played their home games in multiple venues throughout the Mohawk Valley, as a means to increase their local brand and recognition, while raising money for local charities. The team finished a perfect 11–0 in the IBA regular season.

On September 4, 2014, the club announced the hiring of former Siena College player Scott Knapp, as its head coach.

On December 14, 2014, the Legends completed a perfect 13–0 season by defeating the Kenosha Ballers 154–137 in the IBA championship game. Legends player Lloyd Johnson was named the IBA Finals MVP after scoring 61 points in the championship game.

== Current roster ==
Head Coach: Scott Knapp

#		Pos.	Ht.	Player	Acquired	College
3	(United States)	G	6'0"	Lloyd Johnson	2010	Schenectady County Community College
5	(United States)	G	6'4"	EJ Gallup	2011	Coastal Carolina
8	(United States)	G	6'0"	Shea Bromirski	2010	St. Rose College
10	(United States)	G	6'2"	T.J. Czeski	2012	Wagner College
11	(United States)	G	6'1"	Brian Ledbetter	2014	St. Rose College
15	(United States)	G	6'1"	Kareem Thomas	2014	St. Rose College
20	(United States)	G	6'2"	Andy Robinson	2014	University of Buffalo
21	(United States)	F	6'7"	Tyrone Butler	2014	Schenectady High School
23	(United States)	F	6'5"	Zach Bye	2012	St. Rose College
24	(United States)	F	6'5"	Sheldon Griffin	2012	St. Rose College
32	(United States)	C	6'7"	Anthony Bruin	2014	Iona College
33	(United States)	F	6'8"	Clayton Longmire	2014	St. Rose College
42	(United States)	F	7'0"	Brad Sheehan	2014	Georgia Tech

== Notable former players ==
Kenny Satterfield

Rashaun Freeman

== Season results ==
Season	Wins	Losses	Winning Percentage	Finish	Playoff Wins	Playoff Losses	Playoff Results
2010	19	3	(.864)	1st	2	0	IBL Champion
2011	15	7	(.682)	2nd (tie)	1	1	IBL Semifinals
2012 Spring	12	5	(.706)	2nd	2	1	IBA Runner-up
2014 Spring	1	1	(.500)	N/A	DNP	DNP	DNP
2014 Fall	11	0	(1.000)	1st	2	0	IBA Champion
All-time	58	16	(.784)	--	7	2	2 championships

== Coaches ==
#	Name	Term^{[b]}	GC	W	L	Win%	GC	W	L	Win%	Achievements
#	Name	Term^{[b]}	Regular season				Playoffs				Achievements
1	Derek Rowland	2010	22	19	3	.864	2	2	0	.1000	IBL Championship
2	Ben Smith	2011-2012,2014	26	18	8	.692	2	1	1	.500	
3	John Coffino	2012	12	7	5	.583	3	2	1	.667	
4	Nick Dean	2012	3	3	0	.1000	0	0	0	.000	
5	Scott Knapp	2014	11	11	0	.1000	2	2	0	.1000	IBA Championship
All-Time		2010-2014	74	58	16	.784	9	7	2	.778	2 Championships
