= Kankakee County Soldiers =

- Founded: 2007
- League: IBL (2007–2011); IBA (2011–2017)
- Team history: Chicago Heights Soldiers (2007); Windy City Soldiers (2008); Kankakee County Soldiers (2009–2017)
- Based in: Kankakee, Illinois
- Arena: King Middle Grade School
- Colors: Orange, Black
- Owner: Barry Bradford
- Head coach: Tim Riekin
- Championships: 7

The Kankakee County Soldiers was a semi-professional basketball team of the Independent Basketball Association (IBA).

For their first five seasons (2007–11), the Soldiers played in the International Basketball League (IBL). In October 2011 team president Barry Bradford formed the Independent Basketball Association. The Soldiers were one of six charter members of the IBA.

== History ==
Formed in 2007 as the Chicago Heights Soldiers, the club became the Windy City Soldiers in 2008. For the 2009 season it was announced that the team name would change from Windy City Soldiers to Kankakee County Soldiers.

Kankakee County played six seasons in the IBL, winning the 2010 Winter season.

The Soldiers were winners of the first five IBA championships. That streak ended in June 2014 when Grand Rapids Fusion captured the IBA Spring season title.

== Season by season ==
Season	Wins	Losses	Finish	Playoffs
2007 IBL	0	18	6th	
2008 IBL	11	16	4th	
2009 IBL	12	8	4th	
2010 IBL Spring	22	11	4th	
2010 IBL Winter	3	0	1st	IBL Champions
2011 IBL	15	10	5th	
2011-12 Fall	12	5	1st	IBA Champion
2012 Spring	12	3	1st	IBA Champion
2012-13 Fall	18	2	1st	IBA Champion
2013 Spring	?	?	?	IBA Champion
2013-14 Fall	13	3	1st	IBA Champion
2014 Spring	7	4	2nd	IBA Runner-up
2014-15 Fall	5	6	4th	Semifinalist
2015 Spring	6	5	4th	IBA Runner-up
2015 Fall	6	2	1st	IBA Champion

== All-Stars ==
=== 2007 IBL ===
- Barry Bradford
- Amir Major
