= Independent Basketball Association =

Men's league in USA

- Sport: Basketball
- Founded: October 2011
- First season: 2011-12
- Folded: July 2017
- No. of teams: 8
- Country: United States
- Continent: FIBA Americas (Americas)
- Last champion: St. Louis Trotters (Spring 2017)
- Most titles: Kankakee County Soldiers (6)
- Website: www.IBAball.net

The Independent Basketball Association (IBA) was a semi-professional men's basketball league that began play in the fall of 2011. The six charter members were Battle Creek Knights, Chicago Redline, Gary Splash, Kankakee County Soldiers, Lake County Stars and Rockford Riverdawgs.

The IBA played two separate seasons each calendar year: a Spring season (March–June) and a Fall season (September–January). Teams competed in one or both league competitions.

The last commissioner of the IBA was Barry Bradford, president of the Kankakee County Soldiers.

== History ==
The first league championship (2011–12) was won by the Kankakee County Soldiers, who also won the 2012 Spring season championship.

In the Spring of 2012 the league expanded beyond its midwest footprint, adding a total of seven teams: Albany Legends, Kenosha Ballers, Lansing Capitals, Los Angeles Lightning, Malibu Pirates, Springfield Xpress and St. Louis Trotters.

The Holland Dream were added to the IBA for its third season in 2012–13, bringing the league total to 14 teams.

IBA and PBL joined forces in 2013, but the merger was short-lived. Travel issues, questions of league rules and other issues were too much to overcome and the two parted ways before the end of the Spring season.

2013-14 began with the addition of the Windy City Blazers, who played previously as the Windy City Monsters in the ABA. Grand Rapids Fusion and Markham City Racers entered league play for the 2014 Spring season.

In the Fall season of 2014-15 four teams (Binghamton Pioneers, Jersey G-Force, Kansas City Kryptonite, and Toronto 3D) played a partial schedule in anticipation of full league membership in 2015. CyFair Cobras, Houston Xperience and Louisiana Soul also were to compete as "branding teams" in the Fall season. None played an IBA game.

In December 2014 Schenectady Legends captured their first IBA championship, defeating Kenosha 154–137. Albany High School graduate Lloyd "Pooh" Johnson score an IBA championship game record 61 points and was named the game MVP.

Kankakee County won their league-best sixth championship in the Fall of 2015 by avenging their finals loss to St. Louis for the Spring title.

== Teams ==
Team	City	Arena	Founded	First season in IBA
Grand Rapids Fusion	Grand Rapids, Michigan	City High Middle School	2014	2014
Kenosha Ballers	Kenosha, Wisconsin	Boys & Girls Club of Kenosha	1995	2012
Memphis Blues	Memphis, Tennessee	Bert Ferguson Community Center	2016	2017
Milwaukee Falcons	Milwaukee, Wisconsin	Milwaukee Academy of Science	2016	2016
Peoria Panthers	Peoria, Illinois	Peoria High School	2013	2017
St. Louis Trotters	St. Louis, Missouri	Mathews-Dickey Boy's & Girl's Club	1970	2011
Vehicle City Royals	Flint, Michigan	Hamady High School		2017
Windy City Blazers	Aurora, Illinois	Prisco Community Center	2011	2013

=== Former teams ===
Team	City	Arena	Founded	Last season in IBA
Battle Creek Flight	Battle Creek, Michigan	Kellogg Arena	2004	2011
Binghamton Pioneers ^	Binghamton, New York	Binghamton High School	2014	2014
Chicago Redline	Chicago, Illinois	Calument Park Recreation Center	2011	2013
Gary Splash	Gary, Indiana	Genesis Convention Center	2010	2013
Holland Dream	Holland, Michigan	Holland Civic Center	2005	2012
Illinois Hoopville Warriors	Belleville, Illinois	Hoopville Athletic Center	2010	2016
International Racers	Lemont, Illinois	Lithuanian World Center	2014	2014
Jersey G-Force ^	Union City, New Jersey	Union City Sports Complex	2011	2014
Kankakee County Soldiers	Kankakee, Illinois	KVPD RecCenter	2007	2016
Kansas City Kryptonite ^	Kansas City, Kansas	travel team	2014	2014
Lake County Stars	Deerfield, Illinois	Trinity International University	2011	2014
Lansing Capitals	Dimondale, Michigan	Aim High Sports	2006	2016
Los Angeles Lightning	Thousand Oaks, California	Gilbert Sports Arena	2007	2012
Malibu Pirates	Moorpark, California	Moorpark High School	2012	2012
Rockford Riverdawgs	Loves Park, Illinois	Clinton Sports Complex	2010	2011
Schenectady Legends	Scotia, New York	Scotia-Glenville High School	2010	2014
Springfield Xpress	Springfield, Illinois	Lanphier High School	2012	2013
Toronto 3D ^	Toronto, Ontario	The RISE Centre	2014	2014

^ = affiliate members (did not compete for championship)

== Champions ==
Season	Champion	Runner-up	Result
2011 Fall	Kankakee County Soldiers	Gary Splash	2-0 (best-of 3 series)
2012 Spring	Kankakee County Soldiers	Albany Legends	150-116
2012 Fall	Kankakee County Soldiers	Battle Creek Knights	2-1 (best-of 3 series)
2013 Spring	Kankakee County Soldiers	Gary Splash	116-99
2013 Fall	Kankakee County Soldiers	St. Louis Trotters	118-112
2014 Spring	Grand Rapids Fusion	Markham City Racers	104-92
2014 Fall	Schenectady Legends	Kenosha Ballers	154-137
2015 Spring	St. Louis Trotters	Kankakee County Soldiers	100-85
2015 Fall	Kankakee County Soldiers	St. Louis Trotters	95-81
2016 Spring	Kenosha Ballers	St. Louis Trotters	87-83
2016 Fall	Kenosha Ballers	Milwaukee Falcons	117-98
2017 Spring	St. Louis Trotters	Windy City Blazers	123-116

== Awards ==
Season	League MVP	Defensive Player of the Year	Coach of the Year	General Manager of the Year
2011 Fall	Ryan Edwards, Kankakee County Soldiers	Chris Wesby, Gary Splash	Barry Bradford, Kankakee County Soldiers	Melvin Smith, Rockford Riverdawgs
2012 Fall	Billy Baptist, Kankakee County Soldiers	Thomas Cobbs, Kenosha Ballers	Terry Sare, Battle Creek Knights	Barry Bradford, Kankakee County Soldiers
2013 Fall	Ryan Edwards, Kankakee County Soldiers	Willie Davis, St. Louis Trotters	Harold Webster, St. Louis Trotters	Barry Bradford, Kankakee County Soldiers
2014 Fall	Lloyd Johnson, Schenectady Legends	Nicholas Reed, St. Louis Trotters	Scott Knapp, Schenectady Legends	Mike Ceolho, Schenectady Legends
2015 Fall			Jay Bradford, Kankakee County Soldiers	Barry Bradford, Kankakee County Soldiers
2016 Spring	Nicholas Reed, St. Louis Trotters	Thomas Cobbs, Kenosha Ballers	Tony Moore, Kenosha Ballers	Tony Moore, Kenosha Ballers
2016 Fall	Devron Bostick, Kenosha Ballers	Thomas Cobbs, Kenosha Ballers	Richard Moe, Milwaukee Falcons	
