= Lancing College =

Public school in West Sussex, England

Coordinates: 50°50′47″N 00°18′15″W

Lancing College (formerly College of St Mary and St Nicolas)

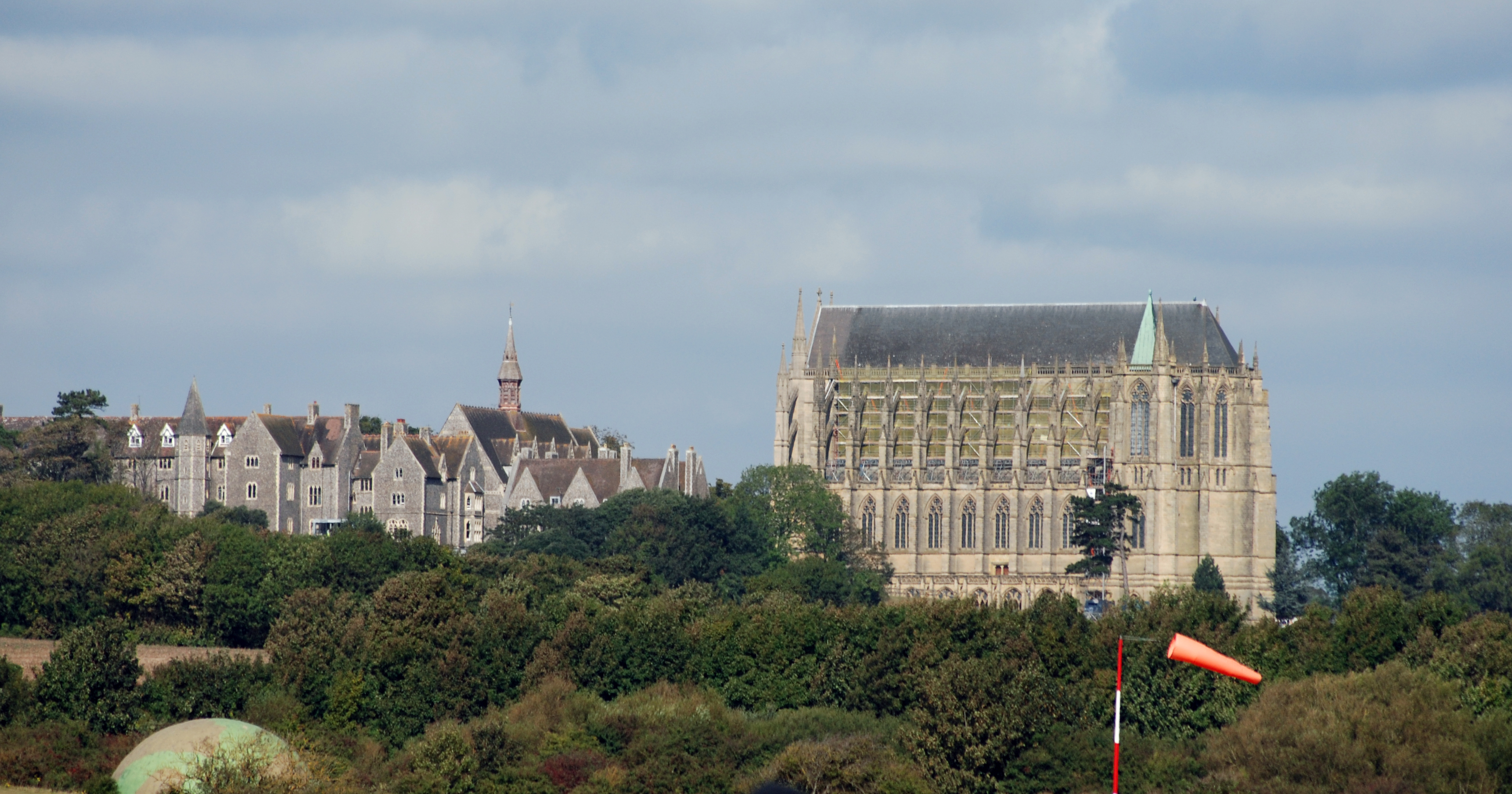
- Lancing, West Sussex, BN15 0RW; England

Information
- Type: Public school Private day and boarding
- Motto: 'Beati Mundo Corde' (Blessed are the pure in heart)
- Religious affiliation: Church of England
- Established: 1848; 178 years ago
- Founder: Nathaniel Woodard
- Department for Education URN: 126108 Tables
- Chairman: Martin Slumbers
- Head Master: Dr Scott Crawford
- Provost: Jonathan Meyrick
- Gender: Mixed
- Age: 13 to 18
- Enrolment: c. 600
- Houses: 10 (Gibbs', School, Head's, Second's, Handford, Sankey's, Field's, Manor, Saints', Teme)
- Colours: Blue and White and Gold
- Publication: The Quad
- Alumni: Old Lancings ("OLs")
- Affiliation: Woodard Corporation
- Website: www.lancingcollege.co.uk

Listed Building – Grade II*
- Official name: Lancing College, Great School
- Designated: 2 December 1985
- Reference no.: 1353753

Lancing College is a public school (English private boarding and day school) for pupils aged 13–18. The school is located in West Sussex, east of Worthing in the parish of Lancing, on the south coast of England. Lancing College was founded in 1848 by Nathaniel Woodard and educates c. 600 pupils between the ages of 13 and 18; the co-educational ratio is c. 60:40 boys to girls. Girls were admitted beginning in 1971. There are five male houses (Gibbs', School, Teme, Head's, Second's) and four female houses (Field's, Sankey's, Manor, Handford). The first mixed house, Saints' House, was established in September 2018, bringing the total number of Houses to 10.

== Overview ==
The college is situated on a hill which is part of the South Downs, and the campus dominates the local landscape. The college overlooks the River Adur, and the Ladywell Stream, a holy well or sacred stream within the College grounds, has pre-Christian significance. Woodard's aim was to provide education "based on sound principle and sound knowledge, firmly grounded in the Christian faith," and the discipline of the prefect's cane. John Dancy was appointed headmaster in 1953 to improve academic standards, which had taken second place to prowess in sport. Lancing was the first of a family of more than 30 schools founded by Woodard. Other schools include Ardingly College, Bloxham School, Denstone College, Ellesmere College, and The Cathedral School, Llandaff.

Roughly 65% of pupils are either full or weekly boarders, at a cost of £18,439 per term; 35% are day pupils, at a cost of £12,602 per term. Occasional overnight stays are available to day pupils at an additional cost of £92 per night.

The school is a member of the Headmasters' and Headmistresses' Conference. Girls were first admitted in 1970. The school is dominated by a Gothic Revival chapel, and follows a high church Anglican tradition. The College of St Mary and St Nicolas (as it was originally known) in Shoreham-by-Sea was intended for the sons of upper middle classes and professional men; in time this became Lancing College, moving to its present site in 1857.

The school's buildings of the 1850s were designed by the architect Richard Cromwell Carpenter, with later ones by John William Simpson.

In 1985 the school hall and classroom blocks were designated a Grade II* listed building.

== History ==
=== Foundation and Early Years (1848–1857) ===
Lancing College was founded in 1848 by the Rev. Nathaniel Woodard, when he published A Plea for the Middle Classes and set out his vision of an Anglican boarding school “based on sound principle and sound knowledge, firmly grounded in the Christian faith”.

Woodard’s aim was to provide for children of the emerging professional and middle-classes the kind of public school education previously reserved for aristocratic families.

Originally known as the “College of St Mary and St Nicolas”, the school initially operated at Shoreham-by-Sea before relocating to its present site on the South Downs above Lancing village.

=== 1854–1911 ===
In 1854 the foundation stone for the new college buildings at Lancing was laid. The architect Richard Cromwell Carpenter was engaged to design the Gothic Revival school buildings, intending the architecture itself to be an “ornament to the country” and to elevate the taste of pupils.

In 1856 Lancing created its own code of football which (unlike other school codes) was regarded as a means of fostering teamwork.

Construction proceeded slowly; the crypt of the chapel was consecrated in 1875, and the upper chapel was dedicated in 1911. Although originally planned to include a great tower, financial constraints meant it was never completed as originally envisaged.

Over the decades the school’s buildings became one of its defining features: commanding the South Downs skyline, and featuring cloister walks and rich Gothic detailing.

=== Developments throughout the 20th Century ===
The 1920's saw significant building developments across the College. The Foundation Stone of the Cloister was laid on 25 June 1921 in memory of the Old Lancings who had died in the First World War. The New Block of classrooms were opened in 1927 and in 1928 The Head Master's House was built at the front of the College, it will later be re-named Teme House.

During the Second World War the College was evacuated to Teme Valley, Shropshire. The naval training establishment HMS King Alfred occupied the College throughout the duration of the war. In 1941 Winston Churchill met with General Montgomery in Teme House at Lancing College.

In 1960 the Amphitheatre was opened by Agatha Christie.

In 1970 the school became fully co-educational, admitting girls and thereby broadening its intake and mission. This was further expanded in the 1990's when day student numbers were allowed to increase to nearly 50% of the student body.

The 150th Anniversary of the College was attended by Princess Anne, The Princess Royal.

=== Recent Developments ===
The west porch of the Lancing College Chapel was completed in April 2022 after fundraising began to complete the Chapel in 2019.

== Chapel ==
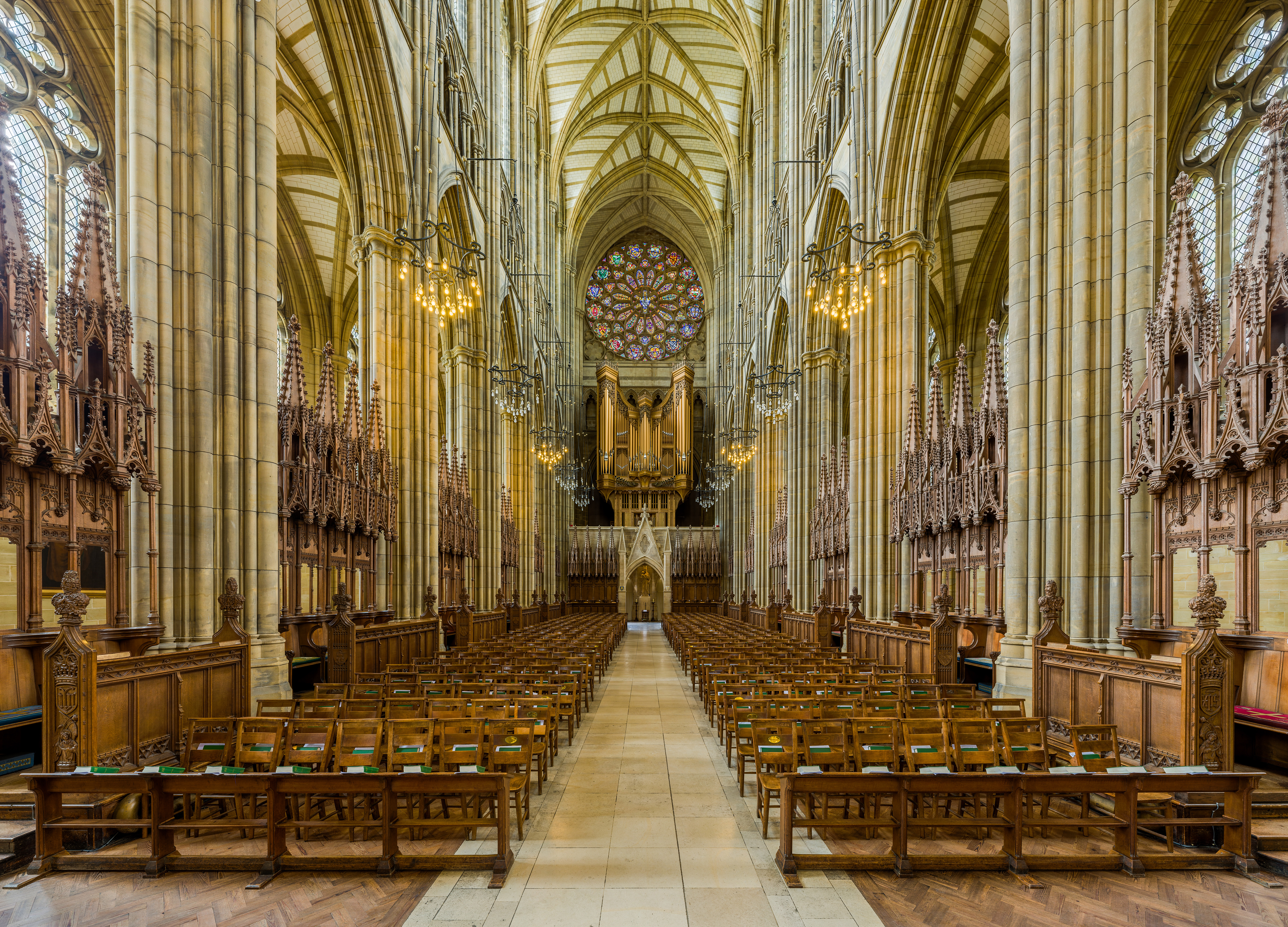
The interior facing west

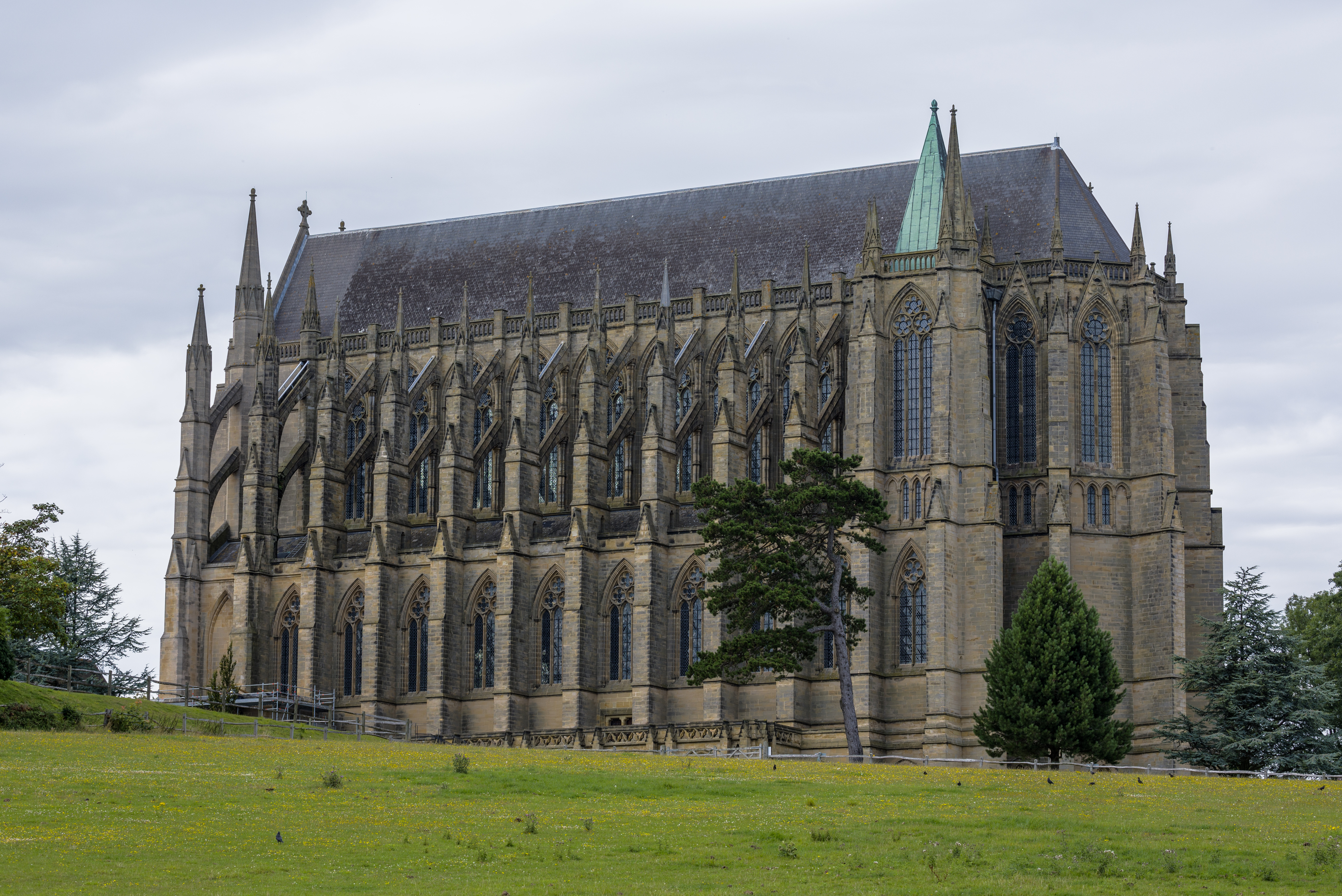
Lancing College Chapel viewed from the south east as of 2014

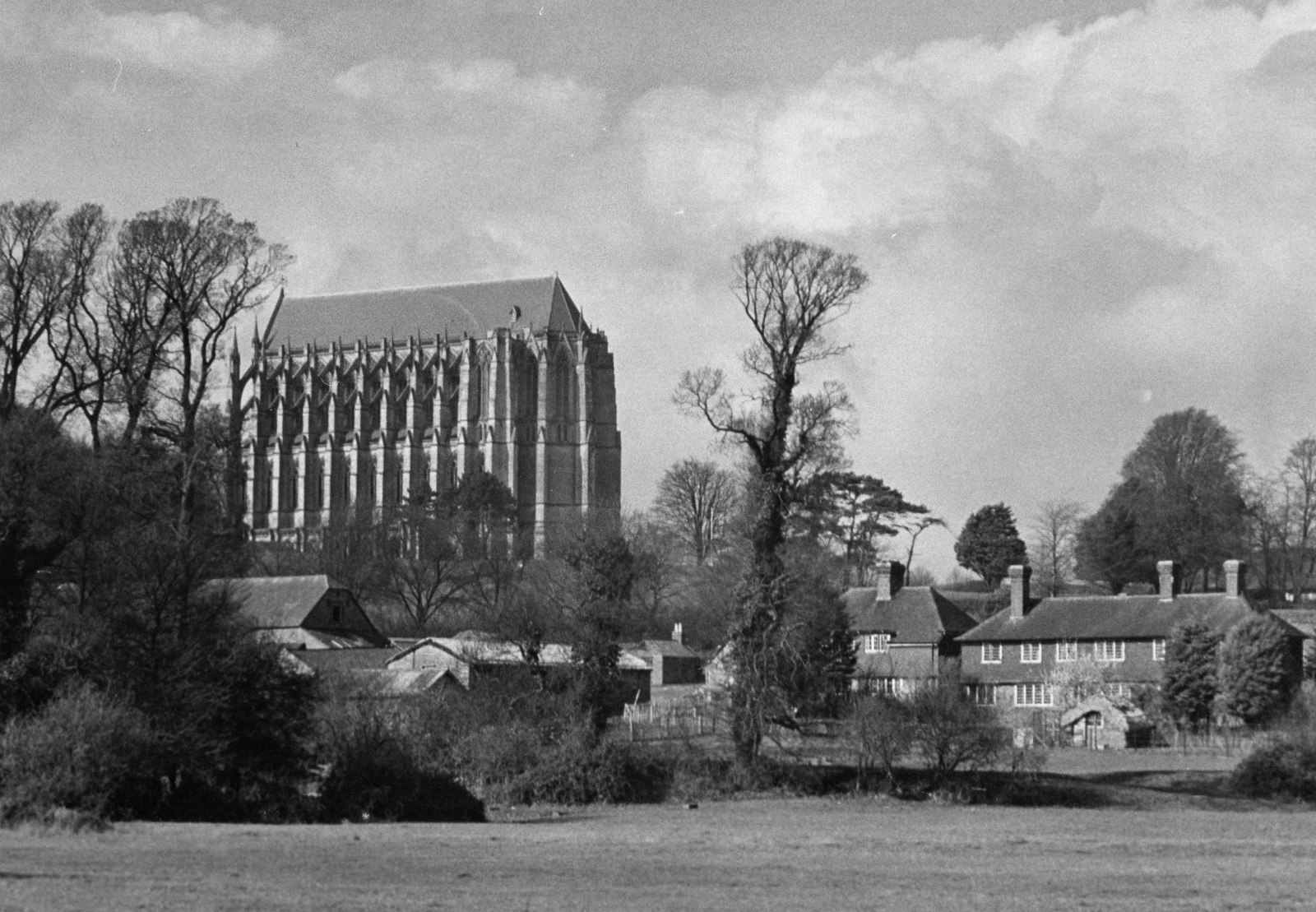
Lancing Chapel in 1950

The college chapel is a Grade I listed building that was finally completed in 2022. The first phase of its construction began in 1863 with the installation of the foundations of the building, completed five years later. One report states that the foundations are 60 feet (18 m) deep. The structure itself would not be fully completed until long after Woodard's death in 1891, although the tower at the west end that had been planned in the 1800s would not be built as of 2024; the tower had been intended to raise the height to 100 metres (330 ft). The apex of the vaulting rises to 27.4 metres (90 ft). It was designed by R. H. Carpenter and William Slater, and is built of Sussex sandstone from Scaynes Hill.

By 18 July 1911, the upper chapel had been built and went into use after its consecration and dedication to St Mary and St Nicholas; this phase of the work was completed through the efforts of Woodard's son, William. "Despite a shortage of funds, he turned all the vaults and oversaw the completion of all but two bays of the main interior ..." according to a 2024 report. The listing by Historic England provides this more specific summary of the Gothic Revival upper chapel at that time:

The main portion of the chapel was finished in 1911. It consists of an apse and 10 bays. Central portion with aisles. Great buttresses flank the windows of the aisles. Over the roof of the aisles double flying buttresses connect the buttresses below to the walls of the main building. Balustrade of pointed arcading. Slate roof. (Historic England)

Prior to July 1911, the college had worshipped in the finished crypt since that was consecrated in 1875.

Before the final completion of the chapel in the 21st century, additional work was completed over the decades. As of May 1978, the structure contained among other things, the tomb of the founder, three organs, and a rose window designed by Stephen Dykes Bower, completed in 1977, and the largest rose window built since the Middle Ages, being 32 feet (9.8 m) in diameter. It was added by James Longley Construction, a building company which operated from 1863 to 2020, and was also involved in the building of Christ's Hospital near Horsham. Some reports state that the structure is the largest school chapel in the world.

The eastern organ is a two-manual mechanical organ built by the Danish firm Frobenius and was installed and voiced in situ in 1986. That year also marked the completion of the rebuild of the four-manual Walker organ at the west end of the chapel – both of which featured in the opening concert by the American organ virtuoso Carlo Curley.

A stained-glass window was commissioned in memory of Trevor Huddleston OL, and consecrated by Desmond Tutu on 22 May 2007. The west wall of the chapel was built between 1960 and 2017. That area had remained bricked up since 1978 when bricks replaced the previous corrugated iron facade.

In 2019 permission was obtained for building the western three-arched porch that had been designed by Michael Drury. During this phase, the brickwork in the facade was also completed, as were the chapel's buttresses.

The chapel was closed to visitors during the coronavirus pandemic and subsequently during the construction of the west end porch and refurbishment work on the school kitchens opposite. It reopened to the public on 25 April 2022.

== Campus ==
During World War II, students were evacuated to Downton Castle in Herefordshire. Both the main college and the prep school buildings were requisitioned by the Admiralty and became part of the Royal Navy shore establishment HMS King Alfred.

== List of headmasters ==
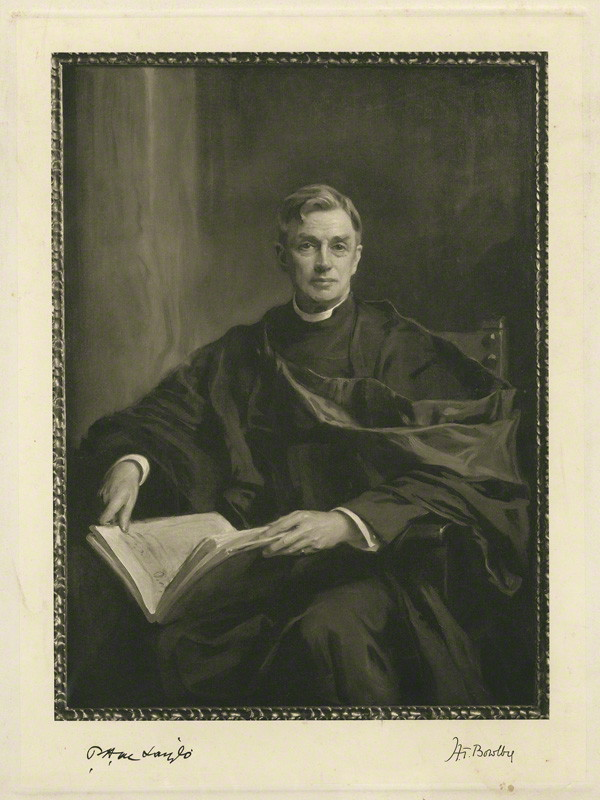
Henry Thomas Bowlby, Headmaster 1909–1925

Ordinal	Name	Dates	Reference
1	Henry Jacobs	Aug–Dec 1848	
2	Charles Edward Moberly	1849–1851	
3	John Branthwaite	1851–1859	
4	Dr Robert Edward Sanderson	1862–1889	
5	Harry Ward McKenzie	1889–1894	
6	Ambrose J. Wilson	1895–1901	
7	Bernard Henry Tower OL	1901–1909	
8	Henry Thomas Bowlby	1909–1925	
9	Cuthbert Harold Blakiston	1925–1934	
10	Frank Cecil Doherty	1935–1953	
11	John Christopher Dancy	1953–1961	
12	Sir William Gladstone, 7th Baronet	1961–1969	
13	Ian David Stafford Beer	1969–1981	
14	James Stephen Woodhouse	1981–1993	
15	Christopher John Saunders	1993–1998	
16	Peter Tinniswood	1998–2005	
17	Jonathan Gillespie FRSA	2006–2014	
18	Dominic Oliver	2014–2025	
19	Dr Scott Crawford	2025–Present	

== House System ==
Name of House	Gender	Day or Boarding	Year Established	Reference
Field's	Girls	Boarding House		
Gibbs'	Boys	Boarding House	1914	
Handford	Girls	Boarding House	1986	
Head's	Boys	Boarding House until 2002. Now a Day House	1857	
Manor	Girls	Boarding House	1978	
Saints'	Mixed	Day House	2018	
Sankey's	Girls	Day House	1973	
School	Boys	Boarding House	1854	
Second's	Boys	Boarding House	1892	
Teme	Boys	Boarding House	1947	

== Co-Curricular and Sports ==
=== Co-Curricular Programs ===
Upper quadrangle view from Great School

Lancing offers a variety of co-curricular programs such as:

- A Combined Cadet Force (CCF)
- Duke of Edinburgh's Award
- Equestrian
- Farming programs
- Scouts

=== Sports ===
Lancing offers a variety of sports for students that include cricket, football, hockey, netball, tennis, and swimming.

==== Cricket ====
Cricket has been played at Lancing since 1857, the first team was captained by G. Woodard, son of Nathaniel Woodard. Cricket is offered during the Summer Term and the program is run by Mr. Rajesh Maru, an ex-professional cricket player.

== Notable alumni ==
=== Arts ===
- George Warner Allen (1916–1988), artist of the Neo-Romantic school
- Tim Battersby (b. 1949), composer, musician and lyricist
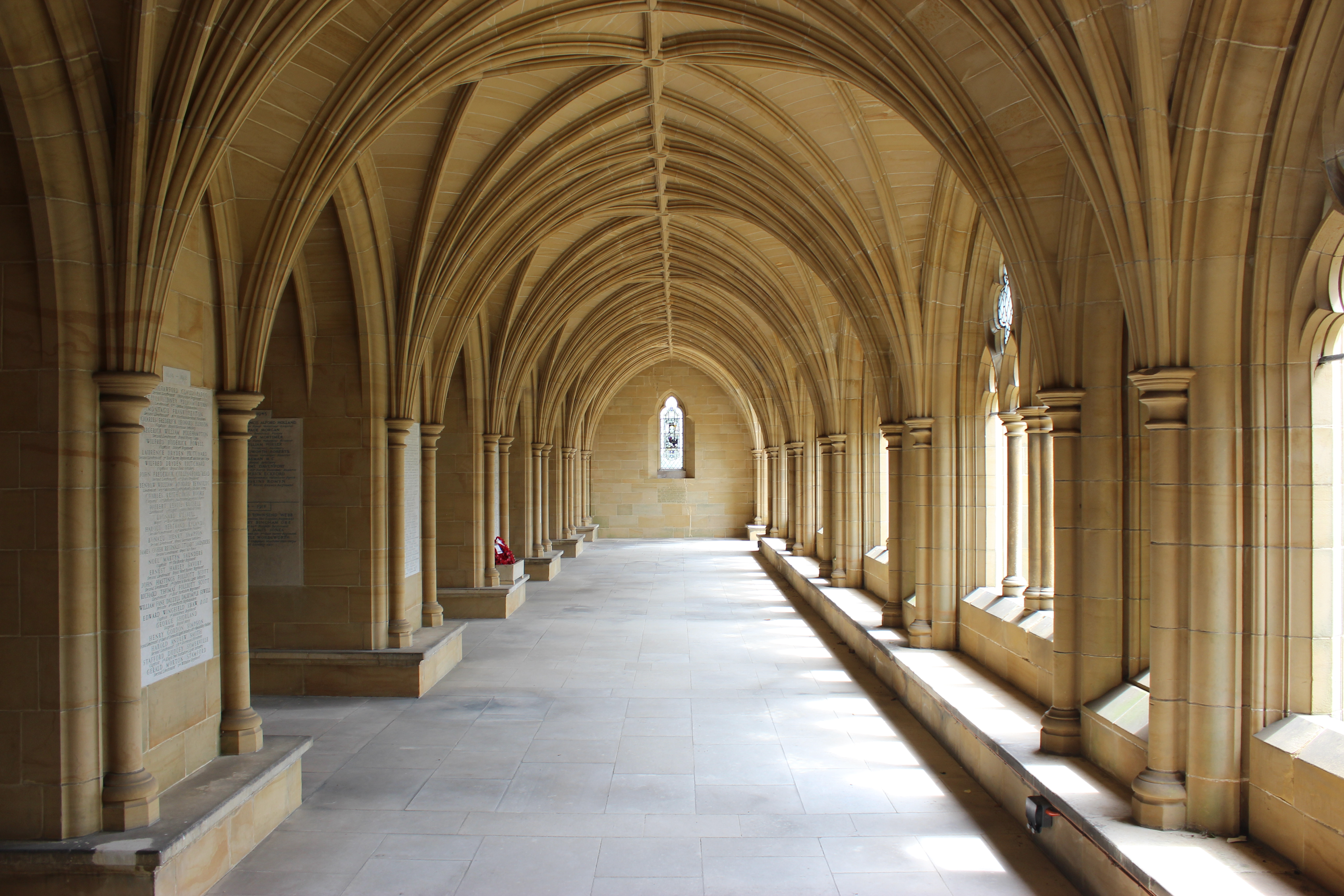
  Memorial Cloister
- David Bedford (1937–2011), composer and musician, worked with (among others) Mike Oldfield, orchestrating Tubular Bells
- Giles Cooper (1918–1966), radio dramatist, injured in The Spanish Civil War, later working with The Royal Shakespeare Company, Kenneth Williams and Harold Pinter and dramatised the works of John Wyndham, Charles Dickens and Sir Arthur Conan Doyle
- John Lowry-Corry, 8th Earl Belmore (b. 1951), Patron of the Arts, on the board of the National Gallery of Ireland
- Frederick Gore (1913–2009), Post-Impressionist artist, educator and author
- Brodrick Haldane (1912–1996), art photographer whom Sir Cecil Beaton described as the founder of modern society photography
- Kenneth Hall (1913–1946), artist, painter, drafter and designer, known for co-founding The White Stag Group
- Henry Hardy (b. 1949), student and editor of the epistemological, dialectical and historiographical works of Isaiah Berlin and music composer
- Sir Peter Pears (1910–1986), tenor, associated with the composer Benjamin Britten, his personal and professional partner
- Edward Piper (1938–1990), artist (son of British Modernist painter and Official War artist, John Piper)
- Sir Tim Rice (b. 1944), lyricist, best known for work with Andrew Lloyd Webber, with whom he wrote Joseph and the Amazing Technicolor Dreamcoat, Jesus Christ Superstar, and Evita; with Björn Ulvaeus and Benny Andersson of ABBA, with whom he wrote Chess
- Neil Richardson (1930–2010), composer, arranger and conductor of various BBC Radio Orchestras

The College Drive

=== Literature and journalism ===
- Nigel Andrews (b. 1947), film critic and author
- Stuart Cloete (1897–1976), novelist
- Andrew Crofts (b. 1953), ghostwriter
- Plantagenet Somerset Fry (1931–1996), historian and author
- Edward Luce (b. 1968), British journalist and chief US commentator for the Financial Times, based in Washington, D.C.
- Mark Mills, novelist and screenplay writer
- Jan Morris (1926–2020), author and journalist
- Alex Preston (b. 1979), novelist
- Tom Sharpe (1928–2013), novelist
- Evelyn Waugh (1903–1966), novelist
- Philip Womack (b. 1981), author and journalist

=== Broadcasting, theatre and film ===
- George Baker (1931–2011), actor best known for portraying Tiberius in I, Claudius, and Inspector Wexford in The Ruth Rendell Mysteries
- Christopher Hampton (b. 1946), playwright
- Sir David Hare (b. 1947), playwright
- Alex Horne (b. 1978), comedian
- Royce Ryton (1924–2009), actor and playwright
- Jeremy Sinden (1950–1996), actor in Chariots of Fire and Brideshead Revisited
- Dali Tambo (b. 1959), South African TV presenter
- Jamie Theakston (b. 1970), TV and radio presenter
- John Williams (1903–1983), actor, appeared in Alfred Hitchcock's Dial M for Murder, The Twilight Zone, Night Gallery, Columbo, and Mission: Impossible

=== Politics and law ===
- Nana Akufo-Addo, President of Ghana (2017–2025)
- Greg Barker, Baron Barker of Battle (b. 1966), Minister of State for Energy and Climate Change (2010–2014)
- Nicholas Browne-Wilkinson, Baron Browne-Wilkinson (1930–2018), Vice-Chancellor of the Supreme Court (1985–1991), Senior Lord of Appeal in Ordinary (1995–2000)
- Tom Driberg, Baron Bradwell (1905–1976), Chairman of the Labour Party (1957–1958)
- Sir Roger Fulford (1902–1983), President of the Liberal Party (1964–1965)
- Patrick Maitland, 17th Earl of Lauderdale (1911–2008), Member of Parliament for Lanark (1951–1959)
- Sir Robert Megarry (1910–2006), Vice-Chancellor of the Chancery Division (1976–1981), Vice-Chancellor of the Supreme Court (1982–1985)
- Hugh Molson, Baron Molson (1903–1991), Minister of Works (1957–1959)
- William Rhys Powell (1948–2022), barrister, Member of Parliament for Corby (1983–1997)
- Sir Charles Arthur Roe (1841–1926), Chief Justice of the Lahore High Court (1895–1898)
- John Sankey, 1st Viscount Sankey (1866–1948), Lord High Chancellor of Great Britain (1929–1935)
- William Thomas Wells (1908–1990), barrister, Member of Parliament for Walsall (1945–1955) and Walsall North (1955–1974)
- Rob Wilson (b. 1965), Minister for Civil Society (Cabinet Office) (2014–2017)

=== Diplomatic service ===
- Sir Philip Adams (1915–2001), British Chargé d'affaires to Sudan (1954–1956), British Ambassador to Jordan (1966–1970), British Ambassador to Egypt (1973–1975)
- David Lloyd (b. 1940), British Ambassador to Slovenia (1997–2000)
- Sir Christopher Meyer (1944–2022), British Ambassador to Germany (1997), British Ambassador to the United States (1997–2003)
- Andrew Page (b. 1965), British Ambassador to Slovenia (2009–2013)
- Sir Elwin Palmer (1852–1906), diplomat and colonial administrator
- Sir John Richmond (diplomat) (1909–1990), British Ambassador to Kuwait (1961–1963), British Ambassador to Sudan (1965–1966)
- Humphrey Trevelyan, Baron Trevelyan (1905–1985), British Chargé d'affaires to China (1953–1955), British Ambassador to Egypt (1955–1956), British Ambassador to Iraq (1958–1961), British Ambassador to Russia (1962–1965), last High Commissioner of Aden (1967)
- Edward Twining, Baron Twining (1899–1967), Governor and Commander-in-Chief, North Borneo (1946–1949); Governor and Commander-in-Chief, Tanganyika (1949–1958)
- Sir Armigel Wade (1890–1966), Colonial Secretary in Kenya (1934–1939)

=== Sciences ===
- Sir Roy Calne (1930–2024), pioneer of liver transplantation
- Jack Herbert Driberg (1888–1946), anthropologist
- Basil William Sholto Mackenzie, 2nd Baron Amulree (1900–1983), physician and geriatrician
- Charles Francis Massey Swynnerton (1877–1938), naturalist
- Richard Mason (1935–1961), last British person to have been killed by uncontacted peoples in the Amazon
- Gino Watkins (1907–1932), Arctic explorer

=== The Church ===
- Michael Ball (b. 1932), suffragan Bishop of Jarrow (1980–1990) and Bishop of Truro (1990–1997)
- Peter Ball (1932–2019), suffragan Bishop of Lewes (1977–1992) and Bishop of Gloucester (1992–1993), convicted sex offender
- Christopher Campling (1925–2020), Dean of Ripon (1984–1995)
- Thomas Cook (1866–1928), Bishop of Lewes (1926–1928)
- Charles Corfe (1843–1921), inaugural Bishop in Korea (1889–1904)
- Anthony Charles Foottit (b. 1935), Bishop of Lynn (1999–2003)
- Sir Francis Heathcote, 9th Baronet (1868–1961), Anglican Bishop of New Westminster (1940–1951)
- Sir Edwyn Hoskyns, 12th Baronet (1851–1925), Bishop of Burnley (1901–1904), Bishop of Southwell (1904–1925)
- Trevor Huddleston (1913–1998), Archbishop of the Indian Ocean (1976–1984), Bishop of Masasi (1959–1968), Bishop of Stepney (1968–1978), Bishop of Mauritius (1978–1984)
- John Kirkham (1935–2019), Bishop of Sherborne (1976–2001)
- Lewis Meredith (1900–1968), Bishop of Dover (1957–1964)
- Cyril Jonathan Meyrick (b. 1952), Bishop of Lynn (2011–2021)
- David Reindorp (b. 1952), vicar of Chelsea Old Church, Chaplain to the Honourable Artillery Company and to the Worshipful Company of Fan Makers
- Erik Routley (1917–1982), Congregational minister, composer and musicologist
- James Leo Schuster (1912–2006), Bishop of St John's (1956–1980)
- Henry Edward Champneys Stapleton (b. 1932), Dean of Carlisle (1988–1998)
- Mark Napier Trollope (1862–1930), third Bishop in Korea (1911–1930)

=== Armed forces ===
- Lt-Gen Sir Louis Jean Bols (1867–1930), Chief of Staff to the Third Army (World War I), Chief Administrator of Palestine (1919–1920)
- Major-General Eric Louis Bols (1904–1985), General Officer Commanding (GOC) 6th Airborne Division (1944–1946)
- Brig Sir Iltyd Nicholl Clayton (1886–1965), policy-maker active in formation of the Arab League
- Col. Andrew Croft (1906—1998), explorer and member of the Special Operations Executive
- Lt-Gen Sir John Fullerton Evetts (1891–1988), Assistant Chief of the Imperial General Staff (1942–1944), Master-General of the Ordnance (1944–1946)
- H.S.H. Maj Prince George G. Imeretinsky (1897–1972), Grenadier Guards and Royal Flying Corps Officer
- H.S.H. Sqn Ldr Prince Michael Imeretinsky (1900–1975), Royal Flying Corps and Royal Air Force Volunteer Reserve Officer
- Col St George Corbet Gore (1849–1913), Surveyor General of India (1899–1904)
- Thomas Percy Henry Touchet-Jesson, 23rd Baron Audley (1913–1963), soldier, playwright
- Capt John Letts (1897–1918), First World War flying ace
- Maj George Henry Wellington Loftus, 7th Marquess of Ely (1903–1969), soldier
- Maj Galbraith Lowry-Corry, 7th Earl Belmore (1913–1960), soldier
- Lt-Gen Vyvyan Pope (1891–1941), GOC XXX Corps (1941)
- AVM John Frederick Powell (1915–2008), Director of Education Services RAF
- Sqn Ldr/Lt Cdr Jeffrey Quill (1913–1996), Spitfire test pilot
- Lt-Gen Sir Alan Reay (1925–2012), Director General Army Medical Services (1981–1984)
- Gen Sir Neil Ritchie (1897–1983), Commander-in Chief, Eighth Army (1941–1942)
- Maj-Gen David Rutherford-Jones, Commandant of the Royal Military Academy, Sandhurst (2007–2009), Military Secretary (2009–2011)
- AVM Sir Stanley Vincent (1897–1976), Air Officer Commanding No. 13 Group (1943–1944), Air Officer Commanding No. 11 Group (1948–1950), only RAF pilot to shoot down the enemy in both world wars
- Sqn Ldr Jefferson Wedgwood (1917–1942), RAF fighter pilot of the Second World War
- Maj-Gen Sir Alexander Wilson (1858–1937), Lieutenant Governor of Jersey (1916–1920)
- RAdm Sir Robert Woodard, Commander of the Royal Yacht Britannia (1985–1990)

=== Business ===
- Sir Edgar Beck (1911–2000), chairman (1961–1979) then president (1981–2000) of Mowlem
- Sir John Gilbert Newton Brown (1916–2003), publisher of the Oxford University Press (1956–1980)
- Sir Michael Darrington (b. 1942), managing director of Greggs
- Paul Duffen (b. 1958), chairman of Hull City A.F.C. (2007–2010)
- Stephen Green, Baron Green of Hurstpierpoint (b. 1948), Group Chairman of HSBC Holdings plc (2006–2010), Minister of State for Trade and Investment (2011–2013)
- Sir Derek Alun-Jones (1933–2004), chairman of Ferranti (1982–1990)
- Raymond Kwok Ping Luen (b. 1952), vice-chairman and managing director of Sun Hung Kai Properties, chairman of SmarTone Telecommunications Holdings Limited

=== Sport ===
- Thomas Southey Baker (1848–1902), amateur athlete who was on the winning crew that won The Boat Race in 1869 and played for England in the fourth unofficial football match against Scotland in November 1871
- Reginald Birkett (1849–1898), England footballer, 1880 FA Cup winner
- Tony Bloom (b. 1970), chairman of Brighton and Hove Albion Football Club
- Edward Cawston (1911–1998), Sussex cricketer
- Edgar Field (1854–1934), England footballer, 1880 FA Cup winner
- Andy Frampton (b. 1979), former footballer
- Arthur Greenfield (1887–1966), first-class cricketer
- Henry Hammond (1866–1910), England footballer
- Elphinstone Jackson (1868–1945), England footballer and co-founder of the Indian Football Association
- Dunlop Manners (1916–1994), first-class cricketer
- Sholto Marcon (1890–1959), England field hockey player, gold medallist at the 1920 Summer Olympics
- Richard Meade, England equestrian and gold medallist at the 1968 Summer Olympics and 1972 Summer Olympics
- George Neale (1869–1915), cricketer
- Cyril Richards (1870–1933), cricketer
- Peter Robinson (1929–2023), cricketer
- Graham Sharman (b. 1938), cricketer and squash player
- Callum Shepherd (b. 1997), jockey
- Charles Wollaston (1849–1926), England footballer, five times FA Cup winner, eighth captain of the England national football team

=== Academia ===
- Rajnarayan Chandavarkar (1953–2006), historian and author, reader in the history and politics of South Asia and fellow at Trinity College, Cambridge
- Nicholas Goodrick-Clarke (1953–2012), Nazi era scholar and researcher of esoteric mystical and secret orders
- Max Mallowan (1904–1978), archaeologist and scholar; British archaeologist, specialising in ancient Middle Eastern history, Mesopotamian civilization and the heritage of Nineveh. Appointed CBE in the 1960 Queen's Birthday Honours, and knighted in 1968
- Brian Manning (1927–2004), radical Marxist polemicist and political activist, member of the Irish Socialist Workers Network
- Rana Mitter (b. 1969), historian and political scientist, focusing on realpolitik, China and the country's increasing role in a multipolar world
- Henry Nettleship (1839–1893), English classical scholar of Virgil
- Peter Self (1919–1999), scholar, Professor of Public Administration at the London School of Economics, where he was a prominent member and leader of its Greater London Group research centre. Father of author Will Self
- John Dover Wilson (1881–1969), literary critic; professor and scholar of Renaissance drama, focusing particularly on the work of William Shakespeare

== Notable former staff members ==
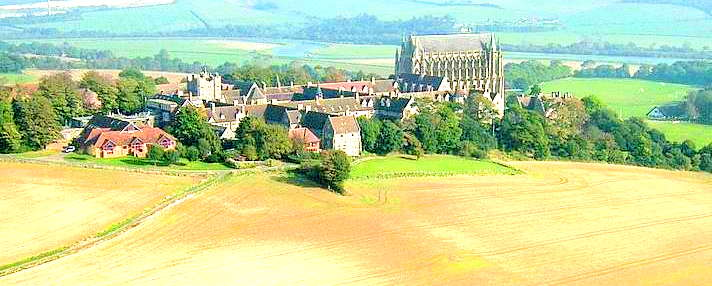
South West side of the College

- Richard Budworth (1867–1937), former Master and an English rugby union forward
- Sheppard Frere (1916–2015), former House Master, Professor of the Archaeology of the Roman Provinces at the University of London (1961–1966), Professor of the Archaeology of the Roman Empire at Oxford University
- Harry Guest (1932–2021), former Master and poet
- John Inge (b. 1955), former chemistry teacher and Assistant Chaplain and current Bishop of Worcester
- Edward Clarke Lowe (1823–1912), former Second Master, Provost of St Nicholas College Lancing and key participant in the foundation and development of the Woodard Schools, and first Headmaster of Hurstpierpoint College
- Arthur Temple Lyttelton (1852–1903), Provost of St Nicholas College Lancing, third Bishop of Southampton (1898–1903)
- J. F. Roxburgh (1888–1954), former Housemaster, first Headmaster of Stowe School
- G.O. Smith (1872–1943), sportsman and footballer of the 19th century
- Haldane Stewart (1868—1942), former Director of Music. Musician and composer. Organist and choirmaster at Magdalen College, Oxford (1919–1938, 1941–1942). Cricketer for Kent County Cricket Club (1892–1903). Father of concert viola performer, Jean Stewart, and of Lorn Alastair Stewart (Johnnie Stewart), who was creator of Top of the Pops

== School Crest and Coat of Arms ==
Coat of arms of Lancing College
Notes Granted in 1923. Escutcheon Argent, on a bend cotised Sable a cross couped between two martlets of the first; all within a bordure engrailed Azure; the whole surmounted of a chief Ermine thereon between two purses Or a pale of the third charged with a lily also Or. Motto 'Beati mundo corde'

== Controversies and Scandals ==
=== Price-Fixing Scandal (2003) ===
In 2003 it was one of fifty of the country's leading independent schools which were found guilty of running an illegal price-fixing cartel which had allowed them to drive up fees for thousands of parents. Each school was required to pay a nominal penalty of £10,000 and all agreed to make ex-gratia payments totaling £3 million into a trust designed to benefit pupils who attended the schools during the period in respect of which fee information was shared.

== See also ==
- Grade II* listed buildings in West Sussex
- List of works by R. C. Carpenter
