= Governor Palmer =

Governor Palmer may refer to:

- Elwin Palmer (1852–1906), Governor of the National Bank of Egypt from 1898 to 1902
- John M. Palmer (politician) (1817–1900), 15th Governor of Illinois
- Richmond Palmer (1877–1958), Governor of The Gambia from 1930 to 1933 and Governor and of Cyprus from 1933 to 1939
- William A. Palmer (1781–1860), 13th Governor of Vermont
