= Henry Bowlby (priest) =

English priest and headmaster (1864–1940

Rev., Canon, M.A. Henry Thomas Bowlby
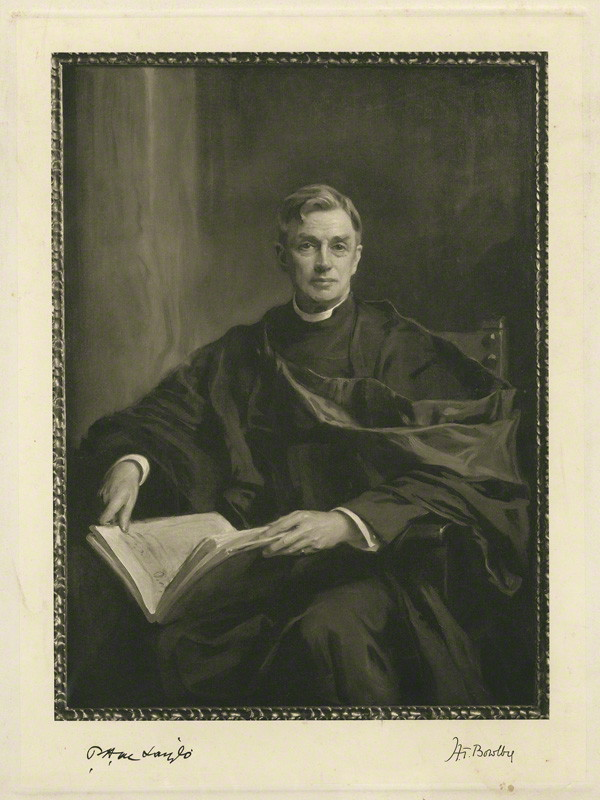
- Portrait of Bowlby by Anglo-Hungarian painter Philip de László, early 20th century

Headmaster of Lancing College
- In office 1909–1925
- Preceded by: Bernard Henry Tower
- Succeeded by: Cuthbert Harold Blakiston

Personal details
- Born: 15 June 1864
- Died: 8 February 1940 (aged 75)
- Spouse: Annie Margaret née Gedge
- Children: 6
- Parent: Henry Bond Bowlby (father)
- Education: Charterhouse School
- Alma mater: Balliol College, Oxford (M.A.)

Rev. Henry Thomas Bowlby (15 June 1864 – 8 February 1940) was an English cleric who served in many positions of nobility, most notably as the headmaster of English public school Lancing College between 1909 and 1925.

Bowlby was born to Rev. Henry Bond Bowlby, the Bishop of Coventry, in 1864, and received his initial education at Charterhouse School. He received a Masters of Arts (M.A.) at Balliol College, Oxford, in 1887, and became clergy after education at the theological school Ripon College Cuddesdon. Between 1887 and 1930, Bowlby served in a number of nobility positions, likely stopping when he did due to lawsuit filed against him which accused him of three counts of assaulting a minor, for which he was later acquitted. He died in 1940 after marrying and having six children, and was highly regarded for his time as headmaster in his obituary.

== Biography ==
Henry Thomas Bowlby was born on 15 June 1864, and baptized about one month later on 13 July. He was educated at Charterhouse School, a boarding school for pupils aged 13–18, and Balliol College, Oxford, where he earned a Master of Arts (M.A.) in 1887. He later received education from the theological school Ripon College Cuddesdon. Between 1887–1909, Bowley served in his first major position as assistant master at Eton College. Between 1909–1925, Bowlby served as headmaster of Lancing College. Between 1925–1930, Bowlby served as resident canon of Chichester Cathedral. This was Bowlby's final major position served, as during his tenure in 1929, Bowlby became the center of a controversy which accused him of "indecently assaulting" three girls under 13 years of age on a train on 5 March. Enough evidence was found by a grand jury to return a true bill, and Bowlby was brought to court on 4 April, pleading not guilty. After a day of deliberation, Bowlby was acquitted on 5 April.

Bowlby died either 7 or 8 February 1940, with a private burial service held on 10 February 1940 at St James the Less Church, Lancing, followed by funeral services at Lancing College Chapel. In attendance were many of Bowlby's children and his wife, who was widowed upon his death, Lancing's current headmaster, Frank Cecil Doherty, and Rev. G. M. Hanks, who represented the governing body of St Mary's Hall, Brighton. In his obituary tribute, Bowlby was described as a "genius" headmaster who concerned himself greatly with developing and strengthening traditions, and maintained a "moderate course" in church politics.

== Personal life ==
Bowlby's immediate family included his parents Rev. Henry Bond Bowlby, the Bishop of Coventry, and Mary Bowlby. He married his wife, Annie Margaret Gedge, on 8 August 1889, and had four sons: Henry Russell Bowlby, Maj Hugh Salvin Bowlby, Cuthbert Francis Bond Bowlby, and Oliver Gerard Bowlby, and two daughters: Margaret Bowlby and Agatha Frances Bowlby. In the early 20th century, a collotype portrait of Bowlby was made by Anglo-Hungarian painter Philip de László, known for his works of aristocratic personages.
