= Chandavarkar =

Chandavarkar is a surname. Notable people with the surname include:

- Bhaskar Chandavarkar (1936–2009), Indian sitar player
- Leena Chandavarkar (born 1950), Bollywood actress
- N. G. Chandavarkar (1855–1923), Prarathana Samaj figure and President of Indian National Congress
- Rajnarayan Chandavarkar (1953–2006), British historian
