= George Neale =

English cricketer and British Army officer

Personal information
- Full name: George Henry Neale
- Born: 31 January 1869; Reigate, Surrey, England
- Died: 28 September 1915 (aged 46); Loos-en-Gohelle, Pas-de-Calais, France
- Batting: Right-handed

Domestic team information
- Years: Team
- 1902: Marylebone Cricket Club

Career statistics
| Competition | First-class |
|---|---|
| Matches | 1 |
| Runs scored | 0 |
| Batting average | 0.00 |
| 100s/50s | –/– |
| Top score | 0 |
| Catches/stumpings | –/– |
- Source: Cricinfo, 21 January 2021

George Henry Neale (31 January 1869 – 28 September 1915) was an English first-class cricketer and British Army officer.

The son of Sisson Watts Neale, a brewer, and Mary A. Neale, he was born at Reigate in January 1869. He was educated at Lancing College, playing cricket for the college in his final two years there. After leaving Lancing College, Neale chose to pursue a career in the army. He was commissioned as a second lieutenant into the King's Own Yorkshire Light Infantry in January 1899, with promotion to lieutenant in following in November 1892. By November 1896, he had transferred to the Queen's Royal Regiment (West Surrey). Neale took part in the Niger–Sudan Expedition of 1896–97, during which he was part of further expeditions to Egbon, Bida, and Ilorin. He commanded Number 6 Company, Royal Niger Company Constabulary, to which he had been seconded in November 1896. He served in British India in 1897, seeing action during the Tirah campaign, while the following year he was promoted to captain in December 1898. Returning briefly to England in 1902, Neale played in a first-class cricket match for the Marylebone Cricket Club against London County at Lord's. He was dismissed twice in the match without scoring by George Gill, with London County winning by 10 wickets.

Returning to British India, he later served in Waziristan in 1902 and in the British expedition to Tibet in 1903–04. Serving as a transport officer in Tibet, he was mentioned in dispatches. Neale played minor cricket matches for Peshawar and Northern Punjab, scoring 55 and 124 for Peshawar against a touring Oxford University Authentics side. He was later promoted to major in June 1911. Neale had transferred to the Middlesex Regiment by 1914, and was serving with them in India when the First World War began in July 1914. He sailed with the regiment back to Britain, arriving on Christmas Eve. He arrived in France with his battalion in January 1915, and soon after saw action at the Second Battle of Ypres, where he commanded B and D companies of the battalion. Following the death of his commanding officer during the battle, Neale took command of the battalion. He was promoted to the temporary rank of lieutenant colonel in May 1915. In September of that year, he participated in the Battle of Loos, where the Middlesex's fought alongside the East Kent Buffs. Attacking a German trench, initial progress for the Middlesex's was good, but casualties began to mount in the face of heavy machine gun fire. Neale was killed in action while ordering his men to withdraw. He was survived by his wife, Agatha Augusta Downie.
