= Jefferson Wedgwood =

British flying ace of WWII

- Born: 28 May 1917; London, England
- Died: 17 December 1942 (aged 25); Żejtun, Malta
- Burial place: Capuccini Naval Cemetery, Malta
- Military career
- Allegiance: United Kingdom
- Branch: Royal Air Force
- Rank: Squadron Leader
- Units: No. 253 Squadron; No. 80 Squadron
- Commands: No. 92 Squadron
- Conflicts: Second World War: Battle of Britain; Western Desert campaign
- Awards: Distinguished Flying Cross & Bar

Jefferson Wedgwood DFC & Bar (28 May 1917 – 17 December 1942) was a British flying ace of the Royal Air Force (RAF) during the Second World War. He is credited with the destruction of at least thirteen aircraft.

Born in London, Wedgwood joined the RAF in 1936 and was serving with No. 65 Squadron at the time of the outbreak of the Second World War. He flew with No. 253 Squadron during the Battle of Britain, claiming several aerial victories during this time. For much of 1941, he was on test pilot duties but early the following year he was appointed commander of No. 92 Squadron. He led this unit for several months during the Western Desert campaign in Egypt, shooting down a number of aircraft during this time. Making a repatriation flight to England, he was killed on 17 December 1942 when the aircraft on which he was a passenger was shot down over Malta in a friendly fire incident.

== Early life ==
Jefferson Heywood Wedgwood was born on 28 May 1917 in London, England. He went to Holyrood School before going on to Lancing College after which, in March 1936, he joined the Royal Air Force (RAF) on a short service commission. As an acting pilot officer, he trained at No. 5 Flying Training School at Sealand. Wedgwood was confirmed in his pilot officer rank in January 1937. Three months later he was posted to No. 2 Air Armament School at North Coates as a staff pilot, relocating with the school to Lee-on-Solent in September 1938. By this time, he was married, having wed Ruth Clocte, a South African, in Chichester.

== Second World War ==
At the time of the outbreak of the Second World War, Wedgwood was serving with No. 65 Squadron but when No. 5 Operational Training Unit was established at Aston Down, he was sent there as an instructor. In June 1940, he was posted to No. 253 Squadron as a flight commander and promoted to flight lieutenant the following month. At the time he joined the squadron, which operated the Hawker Hurricane fighter, it was in the process of rebuilding at Kirton-in-Lindsey after its involvement in the Battle of France.

=== Battle of Britain ===
In late August, No. 253 Squadron moved to Kenley as the Luftwaffe escalated its operations against the RAF airfields in the south of England. Heavily engaged, it was scrambled multiple times a day to counter incoming bombing raids. On 1 September, Wedgwood damaged a Dornier Do 17 medium bomber near Ashford, and three days later shot down a Messerschmitt Bf 110 heavy fighter south of Brooklands. The squadron was involved in the interception of large bombing raids on 9 and 11 September and of the seventeen aircraft claimed to have been destroyed by its pilots across these two days, Wedgwood was credited with destroying three bombers and damaging a fourth.

After being rested towards the end of September, Wedgwood was posted to Cosford on 10 October to serve as an instructor at the Czechoslovak Depot there. He later instructed at No. 8 Flying Training School. Then, at the start of 1941, he was assigned to the aircraft manufacturer Vickers Supermarine's facilities at Eastleigh as a test pilot.

=== Squadron command ===
In January 1942, Wedgwood, who had been promoted temporary squadron leader the previous September, was appointed commander of No. 92 Squadron. This squadron was based at Digby, and preparing for a move to the Middle East. It departed for Egypt in February arriving there two months later. As the squadron's Supermarine Spitfire fighters were not immediately available, Wedgwood and some of his pilots were attached to No. 80 Squadron. This operated Hurricanes on defensive patrols over the Nile Delta and on 27 July, Wedgwood destroyed a Junkers Ju 87 dive bomber near Deir el Dhib, as well as damaging a Messerschmitt Bf 109 fighter.

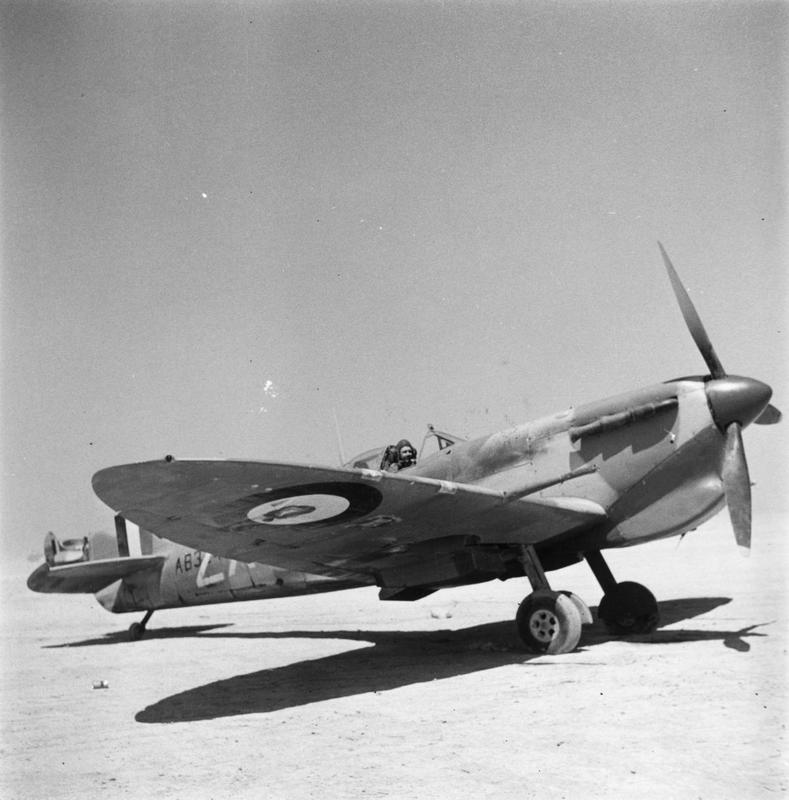
A Supermarine Spitfire in the Western Desert

By August, No. 92 Squadron's Spitfires had arrived and it became operational at Landing Ground 173 on 12 August, from where it sortied against the advancing Axis forces. On 14 August Wedgwood shot down a Bf 109 several miles to north of Landing Ground 97. A Bf 109 was damaged by Wedgwood on 16 August and three days later he damaged another of this type. The same day, to the west of Hamman, he claimed the destruction of what he identified as a Bf 109 but which was actually a Macchi C.202 fighter of the Regia Aeronautica (Royal Italian Air Force). On 21 August he damaged a Bf 109 in the vicinity of El Alamein. Flying in the same area on 30 August, he destroyed a C.202, again incorrectly identifying it as a Bf 109. He damaged a Bf 109 the next day. On 1 September, he damaged three Bf 109s and a Ju 87 over El Alamein but his own aircraft received return gunfire during this engagement. In a subsequent sortie later in the day, he damaged another Bf 109. He destroyed yet another Bf 109 on 2 September. His successes saw Wedgwood being awarded the Distinguished Flying Cross. The citation, published in The London Gazette on 2 October, read:

In August, 1942, whilst patrolling the battle area, this officer led his squadron brilliantly in an attack against a superior number of enemy fighters. Despite the odds, Squadron Leader Wedgwood so disposed his squadron that, during the combat, at least 4 enemy aircraft were destroyed and several more were damaged. Throughout, this officer who, in the fighting, shot down a Messerschmitt 109F, displayed great tactical ability. Squadron Leader Wedgwood has always set a most courageous example. He has destroyed at least 6 and damaged many more hostile aircraft.

— London Gazette, No. 35727, 2 October 1942

A week after the gazetting of his DFC, Wedgwood shot down a pair of Bf 109s near Daba. On 22 October he destroyed a Bf 109 to the north of El Alamein and this was followed on 29 October with his destruction of another Bf 109, also near El Alamein. By this time, the British were on the offensive and the squadron provided cover for the advancing troops and carried out strafing sorties. At the start of December he relinquished command of No. 92 Squadron ahead of repatriation to England. He was travelling as a passenger in a Handley Page Halifax transport on 17 December to commence his return to England when, in an instance of friendly fire, it was shot down by British anti-aircraft guns over Malta. All on the Halifax, which crashed near Żejtun, were killed. He is buried at the Capuccini Naval Cemetery in Malta. A posthumous award of a Bar to his DFC was announced on 5 February 1943.

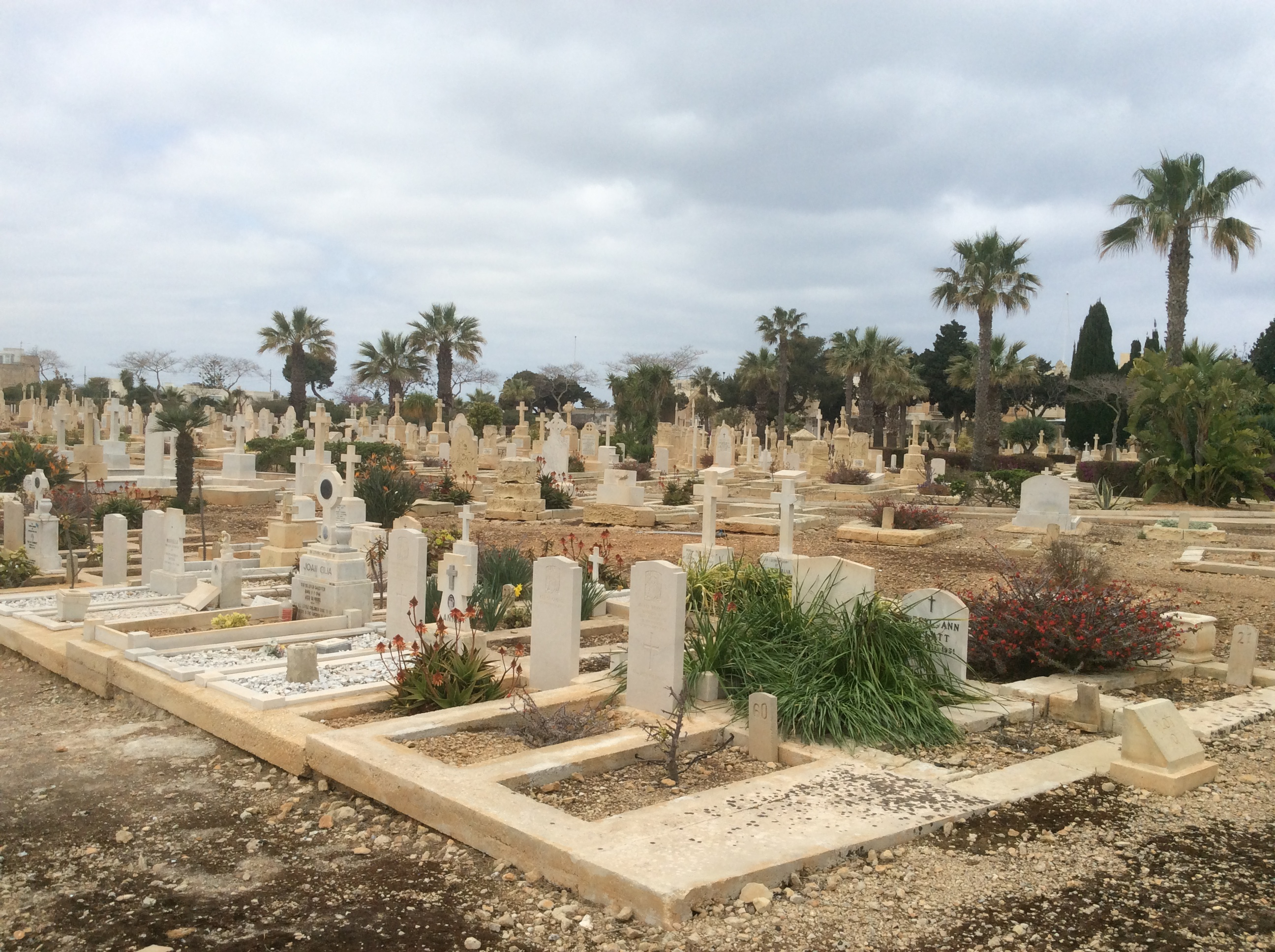
Capuccini Naval Cemetery, where Wedgwood is buried

Wedgwood is credited with having destroyed thirteen aircraft and damaging twelve more. Along with four other former students of Lancing College, Wedgwood is commemorated on a memorial plaque in the school's War Memorial Cloister.
