= Brodrick Haldane =

Scottish photographer (1912–1996)

Brodrick Vernon Chinnery-Haldane (12 July 1912 – 3 February 1996) was a Scottish-born society photographer whom his English contemporary Sir Cecil Beaton allegedly once described as the founder of modern society photography.

== Early life ==
Brodrick Haldane was the youngest of four children from one of Scotland's oldest landed families, the Haldanes of Gleneagles. His early years were spent at Alltshellach, the family's home in the Inverness-shire district of Nether Lochaber, where his grandfather had been Bishop of Argyll and the Isles. In 1918, his father inherited a 7,000-acre (28 km^{2}) Perthshire estate and became the 26th Laird of Gleneagles.

Having attended Lancing College, Brodrick was well aware that he had not made the best of his scholastic opportunities. Attracted to the stage, he became an extra at Elstree Studios and featured in such early films as Murder in Monte Carlo, starring Errol Flynn, and Two Hearts in Waltz Time.

== Career ==
It was the purchase of a Vest Pocket Kodak which changed Haldane's life. Extrovert in nature, although he always claimed to be shy, he persuaded George Bernard Shaw and Margot Asquith, the Countess of Oxford & Asquith, to sit for him. Being well-connected, he gained easy access to the balls and dances of the London Season. Surprisingly, his parents took a lenient view of his new-found vocation. "So long as you don't disgrace the family name," was his father's only advice.

Throughout the 1930s, it was fashionable for the wealthy to spend their summers in the South of France and winters in Austria or Switzerland. Every year, the routine would be similar, the same people being found in the same places, and as a consequence, unexpected familiarities were established. When he was rushed to hospital for an appendix operation shortly before the Second World War, one of those who came to visit him was Rose Kennedy, mother of the future American president. One of Brodrick's most striking group portraits is of Rose with her children, including the future President, on holiday.

In Monte Carlo, he hunted down the Duke and Duchess of Windsor at a charity gala, and they invited him to join their table. "They seemed rather lonely," he recalled. " I had photographed the duchess before when she was married to Ernest Simpson, and she recognised me."

Serving as a gunner with the 83rd Battery during the war, Haldane was stationed at Chatham. After peace was declared in 1945, he recognised immediately that the glittering social world of between the wars would never be the same again, then a chance encounter with Michael Powell, the film director, led him to two years' work at Pinewood Studios.

This completed, he was invited to stay in Switzerland. with the Countess Chevreau d'Antraigues, daughter of the Scottish shipping tycoon Sir John Latta. She was to become his greatest benefactor and for twenty years her home L'Elysee in Lausanne, became his operational European base. With Queen Victoria Eugenie of Spain, Queen Victoria's granddaughter, living in the house next door, there was a constant coming-and-going between the Royal Houses of Europe. In addition, Charles Chaplin was in tax exile in nearby Vevey, and Noël Coward had bought a villa at Les Avants, where Marlene Dietrich was a regular visitor.

In 1964, Haldane returned to Scotland where his elder brother, Captain Alexander Chinnery-Haldane, had by then become 27th Laird of Gleneagles. Although the two brothers were entirely different in character, there was a strong bond between them. For the remaining thirty years of his life, Haldane lived in great style at 56, India Street in Edinburgh's Georgian New Town while continuing to photograph many of the well-known personalities of Scottish life. Among those who regularly stayed in his home were Margaret, Duchess of Argyll, and her successor as wife of the 11th Duke of Argyll, Mathilda, Duchess of Argyll.

In 1984, Haldane officially opened his Edinburgh flat to the general public and visitors could enjoy a tour for fifty pence. On his drawing room walls he displayed some of the more memorable portraits of the rich and famous, and at the time of his death in 1996 was planning a retrospective exhibition of his life's work.

== Bibliography ==
- Time Exposure – Brodrick Haldane in conversation with Roddy Martine. Arcadia.1999.
