= Andrew Page (diplomat) =

British diplomat

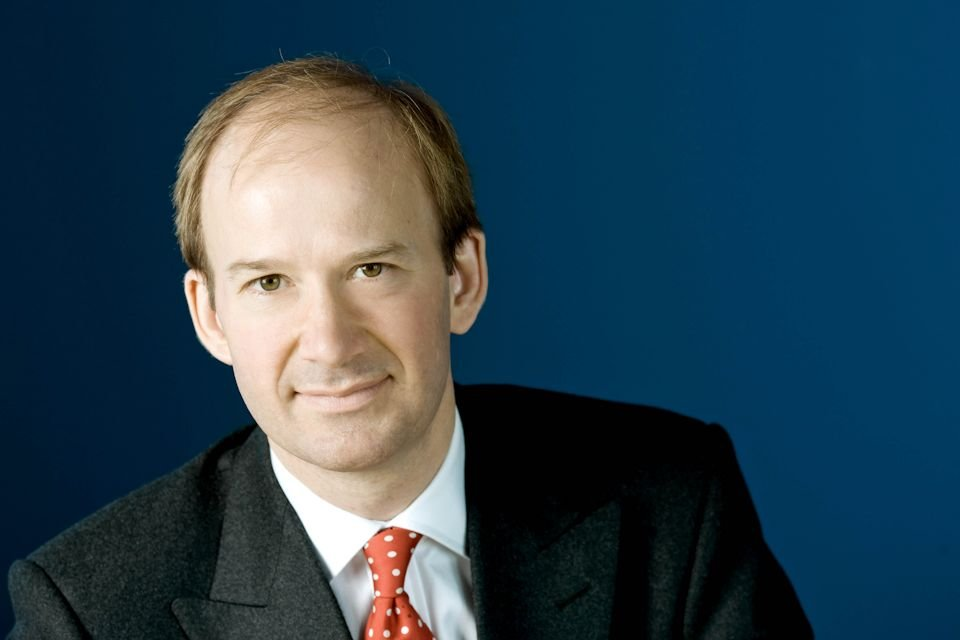

Andrew John Walter Page (born 17 September 1965) is a British diplomat.

He was educated at Windlesham House School, Lancing College and Jesus College, Cambridge. He was Deputy Head of the Russia, South Caucasus and Central Asia Directorship (2004–2008) before being appointed as British Ambassador to Slovenia in 2009. He left Slovenia in December 2013.

Diplomatic posts
Preceded by Timothy Simmons	British Ambassador to Slovenia; 2009–2013	Succeeded by James Hilton (chargé d'affaires)
