= Nathaniel Woodard =

Priest in the Church of England (1811–1891)

The Reverend Nathaniel Woodard
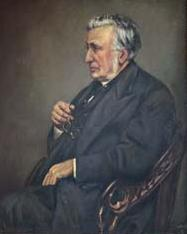
- Born: 21 March 1811; Basildon, England
- Died: 25 April 1891 (aged 80)
- Resting place: Lancing College Chapel
- Education: Hertford College, Oxford
- Occupations: Priest and educator

Nathaniel Woodard (/ˈwʊdɑːrd/ WUUD-ard; 21 March 1811 – 25 April 1891) was a priest in the Church of England. He founded 11 schools for the middle classes in England whose aim was to provide education based on "sound principle and sound knowledge, firmly grounded in the Christian faith". His educational principles are promoted today through the Woodard Corporation, a registered charity.

== Early life ==
Woodard was born at Basildon Hall in Essex (now known as Barstable Hall) the son of John Woodard, a country gentleman of limited means. He was brought up and educated privately by his mother Mary née Silley, a pious and devout woman. In 1834 he entered Magdalen Hall, Oxford (now Hertford College, Oxford), where his academic studies were interrupted by his marriage in 1836 to Harriet Brill, although he took a pass degree in 1840.

As a result of the influence of his mother, Woodard's religious sympathies were Evangelical when he first became a student at Oxford, but, whilst he was there, he soon found himself strongly drawn to the growing Tractarian Movement and, as a result, developed Anglo-Catholic sympathies that he kept for the remainder of his life.

== Career ==
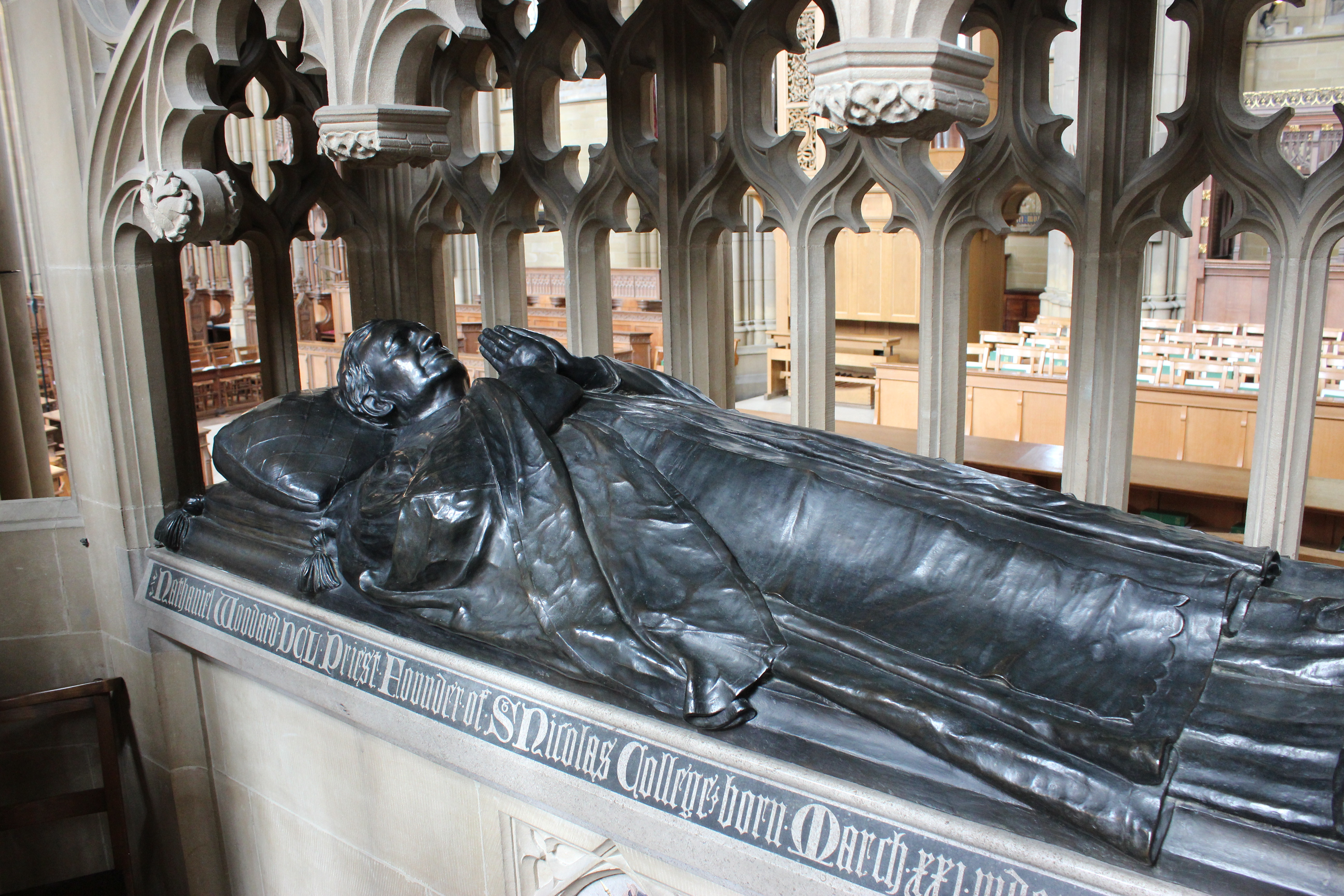
Tomb of Nathaniel Woodard in Lancing College Chapel

He was ordained in 1841 and obtained a curacy at St Bartholomew's, Bethnal Green. Here he started a church school for the children of deprived parishioners. As a result of a controversial sermon - in which he argued that The Book of Common Prayer should include separate provisions for confession and absolution - he was moved to another curacy at St James the Greater, Clapton.

In 1846, obtaining a curacy at St Mary de Haura Church in New Shoreham, he was again struck by the poverty, and the lack of education amongst his middle class parishioners—many of whom were less well educated than many of their employees who had been educated in the parochial school. He opened a day school in his vicarage, and in 1848 he started St Nicolas' School, which took boarders. This was merged in 1849 to form the College of St Mary and St Nicolas, which eventually formed the present day Lancing College. It was from these beginnings that he started to work full-time on promoting educational projects, resigning from his curacy in 1850. Woodard was supported in these endeavours by Edward Clarke Lowe, headmaster and director of many of the schools, who prevailed upon him in 1874 to provide for the education of women at the schools founded in Abbots Bromley.

The extent of his success was recognised in 1870 when the University of Oxford bestowed on him the degree of DCL and he was made Canon of Manchester Cathedral by Gladstone. Woodard used the majority of the generous stipend which went with his position as Canon towards the funds for building the schools.

In accordance with his firm Anglo-Catholic beliefs, and in contrast to similar although less successful work by Joseph Lloyd Brereton there were no concessions to either those Anglicans of the low church or to those belonging to non-conformist churches. The efforts of Woodard and his supporters raised about £500,000 by the time of his death in 1891, and Woodard succeeded in gaining the admiration of people like William Ewart Gladstone and Matthew Arnold.

His tomb is in the chapel of Lancing College.

== Schools ==
'... till the Church educates and trains up the middle classes, she can never effectually educate the poor'

— Nathaniel Woodard, That One Idea, by Leonard and Evelyn Cowie

In his lifetime Nathaniel Woodard founded eleven schools and acquired a number of others.

These include:

- 1848: Lancing College
- 1849: Hurstpierpoint College
- 1858: Ardingly College
- 1868: Denstone College (formerly: St Chad's)
- 1874: Abbots Bromley School for Girls (formerly: the School of St Mary and St Anne)
- 1880: King's College (Taunton)
- 1884: Ellesmere College (formerly: St Oswald's School)
- 1890: Worksop College (formerly: St Cuthbert's College)

and, since his lifetime

- 1912: Queen Ethelburga's Collegiate
- 1964-1999 Cawston College (East of England)

== Legacy ==
The schools he founded became known collectively as the "Woodard Schools", being joined by others to form an influential group. These are now administered by a holding company – The Woodard Corporation – a registered charity operating over 20 private schools with many other schools affiliated or associated with it.
