= Dunlop Manners =

English cricketer and British Army officer

Personal information
- Full name: Dunlop Crawford John Manners
- Born: 24 August 1916; Kuala Lumpur, Federated Malay States
- Died: 14 August 1994 (aged 77); Durban, KwaZulu-Natal, South Africa
- Batting: Right-handed
- Bowling: Right-arm fast

Career statistics
Competition	First-class
Matches	1
Runs scored	33
Batting average	–
100s/50s	–/–
Top score	33*
Balls bowled	160
Wickets	1
Bowling average	83.00
5 wickets in innings	–
10 wickets in match	–
Best bowling	1/83
Catches/stumpings	1/–
- Source: Cricinfo, 23 May 2019

Dunlop Crawford John Manners (24 August 1916 – 14 August 1994) was an English first-class cricketer and British Army officer. Manners served with the Buffs (Royal East Kent Regiment) from 1936–1961, during which he served in the Second World War and played first-class cricket for the British Army cricket team.

== Life and military career ==
Manners was born at Kuala Lumpur in the Federated Malay States, before coming to England where was educated at Lancing College. After completing his education, he chose a career in the British Army and enlisted with the Buffs (Royal East Kent Regiment) as a second lieutenant in December 1936. He made a single appearance in first-class cricket for the British Army cricket team against Cambridge University at Fenner's in 1939. Batting once in the match, Manners scored 33 not out in the Army first-innings, while with the ball he took a single wicket, that of Patrick Dickinson in the Cambridge University first-innings.

He served with the Buffs in the Second World War, during which he was promoted to the rank of lieutenant in January 1941. Following the war, he was promoted to the rank of captain in July 1946, with promotion to the rank of major coming in January 1952. He was made a brevet lieutenant colonel in November 1956, and achieved the full rank in December 1959. Manners retired from active service in August 1961. He later emigrated to South Africa, where he died at Durban in August 1994.
