= Cyril Richards =

English cricketer

Personal information
- Full name: Cyril James Ridding Richards
- Born: 14 July 1870; Andover, Hampshire, England
- Died: 27 October 1933 (aged 63); Cluny Castle, Aberdeenshire, Scotland
- Batting: Left-handed
- Bowling: Left-arm fast

Domestic team information
- Years: Team
- 1895: Hampshire

Career statistics
Competition	First-class
Matches	1
Runs scored	48
Batting average	24.00
100s/50s	–/–
Top score	43
Catches/stumpings	–/–
- Source: Cricinfo, 29 December 2009

Cyril James Ridding Richards (14 July 1870 — 27 October 1933) was an English first-class cricketer and educator.

The son of The Reverend H. M. Richards, he was born in July 1870 at Andover. He was educated at Lancing College, where he played for both the cricket and football elevens. From Lancing, he matriculated to Exeter College, Oxford, graduating in 1893. Richards association with Hampshire began in 1889, when Hampshire were a second-class county. He later made a single appearance in first-class cricket for the county against Surrey at The Oval in the 1895 County Championship. Batting twice in the match, he was dismissed in Hampshire's first innings for Tom Richardson, while in their second innings he was dismissed for 5 runs by the same bowler. By profession, Richards was an educator. In 1900, he was an assistant-master at Evelyn's School in Hillingdon. Richards died in Scotland at Cluny Castle in Aberdeenshire in October 1933.
