= John Gilbert Newton Brown =

British businessman

Sir John Gilbert Newton Brown CBE (7 July 1916 – 3 March 2003) was Publisher of the Oxford University Press and has been credited as one of the great leaders of British publishing throughout its post World War II recovery.

== Biography ==
He was born on 7 July 1916 and was educated at Lancing College and Hertford College, Oxford. After university, he travelled to India to join the Oxford University Press at its Bombay branch in 1937. At the outbreak of war, Brown was commissioned into the Bombay Light Horse before transferring to the Royal Artillery. He was taken prisoner by the Japanese after the fall of Singapore and spent the remaining war years as a prisoner of war.

Following release, he rejoined the OUP in London in 1946 and was appointed sales manager in 1949 and publisher in 1956. He was elected president of the Publishers' Association in 1963 and helped to found the Book Development Council with John Attenborough. Brown left the OUP to join the Blackwell Publishing Group in the 1980s. He rose to be group vice-president in 1987, a position he held until his death in 2003.

Brown was appointed CBE in 1966 and knighted in 1974. He is survived by his wife, son and two daughters.
