= Graham Sharman =

English cricketer (born 1938)

Personal information
- Full name: Graham John Sharman
- Born: 30 May 1938 (age 88); St Pancras, London, England
- Height: 5 ft 11 in (1.80 m)
- Batting: Right-handed
- Bowling: Leg break googly

Domestic team information
- Years: Team
- 1958: Oxford University

Career statistics
Competition	First-class
Matches	2
Runs scored	9
Batting average	2.25
100s/50s	–/–
Top score	6
Catches/stumpings	–/–
- Source: Cricinfo, 16 April 2020

Graham John Sharman (born 30 May 1938) is an English former first-class cricketer and squash player.

Sharman was born in May 1938 at St Pancras. He was educated at Lancing College, where he was coached in cricket by Kenneth Shearwood. From Lancing, he went up to Lincoln College, Oxford. While studying at Oxford, he made two appearances in first-class cricket for Oxford University in 1958, against Yorkshire and Derbyshire at Oxford. He also played squash while at Oxford, gaining a blue. After graduation, he worked as an engineer at Shell in Shell haven, Essex. Next, he attended University College, London and received a diploma in Chemical Engineering. Simultaneously, he worked for Air Products in London from 1962 to 1966. In that year, he emigrated to the United States, where he worked for Bechtel Associates as a project Engineer in New York . In 1969-1971, he attended the Harvard Business School, and received an MBA. Leaving Harvard, he joined McKinsey and Company.His McKinsey career included working for 26 years in the New York, Toronto, Dallas and Amsterdam offices. He became a US citizen in 1974. He retired from McKinsey as a Director and head of the international logistics practice. 2 years prior to retiring, he was invited to become a full Professor in International Logistics at the Technical University of Eindhoven in the Netherlands. He retired there in 2003 at age 65. Subsequently, he and his wife Gay moved to New Mexico. Both in the UK and US, he played squash competitively. Alongside his squash partner Don Mills, he was ranked number one in squash doubles in the United States in the over–75 division in 2016.
