= Derek Alun-Jones =

British businessman

Sir John Derek Alun-Jones (6 June 1933 – 19 January 2008) was a British businessman and chairman of Ferranti at the time of its merger with US company International Signal and Control (ISC).

He was educated at Lancing College and St Edmund Hall, Oxford, where he read Law. He began his career with Philips Industrial in 1957, and became managing director of Expandite in 1966. He moved to Burmah Oil in 1971, and became a director of Burmah Oil Trading before moving to Ferranti in 1975.

Alun-Jones was director of Royal Insurance Holdings from 1981. Alun-Jones was appointed chairman of Ferranti in 1982 and oversaw the £420 million merger with the Pennsylvania based company International Signal & Control in 1987. However, it soon became apparent that a subsidiary of ISC had been involved in a huge fraud which had inflated the value of ISC at the time of the merger. Ferranti went into receivership in 1993.

He remained a director of several companies after leaving Ferranti and was chairman of the governors of Lancing College from 1986 to 1999. He was knighted in 1987.
