= Victoria Harrison (diplomat) =

British diplomat

Victoria Harrison is a diplomat at the British Foreign, Commonwealth and Development Office who has been appointed the British Ambassador to Slovenia from August 2024. She is the UK's first overseas ambassador who is totally blind.

Harrison was born in Dumfries, Scotland. She joined the Foreign Office in 1992 and has had postings to Bosnia-Herzegovina and Finland.
