= David Lloyd (diplomat) =

British diplomat (born 1940)

David Andrew Lloyd OBE (born 24 December 1940) is a former British diplomat.

He was educated at Lancing College and Clare College, Cambridge. He was appointed as British Ambassador to Slovenia in 1997 before retiring from the Diplomatic Service in 2000.

Diplomatic posts
Preceded by Gordon MacKenzie Johnston	British Ambassador to Slovenia; 1997–2000	Succeeded by Hugh Mortimer
