= Arthur Greenfield =

English cricketer and soldier

Personal information
- Full name: Arthur Cyril Greenfield
- Born: 5 March 1887; Wandsworth, Surrey, England
- Died: 9 October 1966 (aged 79); Tunbridge Wells, Kent, England
- Batting: Right-handed

Domestic team information
- Years: Team
- 1921/22–1926/27: Europeans

Career statistics
Competition	First-class
Matches	3
Runs scored	57
Batting average	14.25
100s/50s	–/–
Top score	31
Catches/stumpings	1/–
- Source: Cricinfo, 28 December 2023

Arthur Cyril Greenfield (5 March 1887 – 9 October 1966) was an English first-class cricketer and an officer in the British Indian Army.

The son of J. H. Greenfield, he was born at Wandsworth in March 1887. He was educated at Lancing College. After leaving Lancing, he went to British India at work for David Sassoon & Co. in Karachi. During the First World War, he was commissioned into the British Indian Army Reserve of Officers as a second lieutenant in January 1915, with promotion to lieutenant following in January 1916. Toward the end of the war, he was made a temporary captain in May 1918 and a temporary major in September of the same year, the latter while second-in-commanding of a unit in the 4th Gwalior Imperial Service Infantry. Following the war, he was promoted to the full rank of captain in January 1919.

Whilst in India, Greenfield made three appearances in first-class cricket for the Europeans cricket team. Two of these came in the 1921–22 and 1922–23 Bombay Quadrangular Tournament against the Hindus and the Parsees, with his third match coming against the touring Marylebone Cricket Club at Karachi Gymkhana. In these, he scored 57 runs at an average of 14.15, with a highest score of 31. He later retired to England, where he died in October 1966 at the Kent and Sussex Hospital in Tunbridge Wells following a short illness; he was survived by his widow and two sons.
