= Charles Arthur Roe =

British colonial administrator

Sir Charles Arthur Roe (24 September 1841 – 28 January 1927) was a British colonial administrator in India who was Chief Justice of the Lahore High Court from 1895 to 1898.

He was born in Blandford Forum, Dorset, England to John Banister Roe and his wife, Mary Anne Allies. He was educated at Lancing in Sussex followed by Merton College, Oxford, where he was Boden Sanskrit scholar in 1863. He took up a post with the Indian Civil Service in Bengal in 1862.

He was appointed Assistant Commissioner of the Punjab in 1863, Deputy Commissioner in 1878 and Additional Commissioner in 1883. A series of judicial appointments followed culminating in his appointment as Chief Justice of the Lahore High Court in 1895. He was also appointed Vice-Chancellor of the University of the Punjab, Lahore.

He married Elizabeth, a daughter of Frederick Gaskell. They had at least four sons and one daughter. His son, Francis Reginald Roe (1862–1942), was a judge of the Patna High Court, while another son, Arthur Robert Montgomery Roe (1882–1914) was killed in the First World War while serving with the Dorsetshire Regiment. His daughter Frances Mary Elizabeth Roe (1866–1965) married Sir James Douie.

Roe was knighted in 1897. He died of heart failure in Oxford, aged 85.
