= Elwin Palmer =

British colonial administrator (1852–1906)

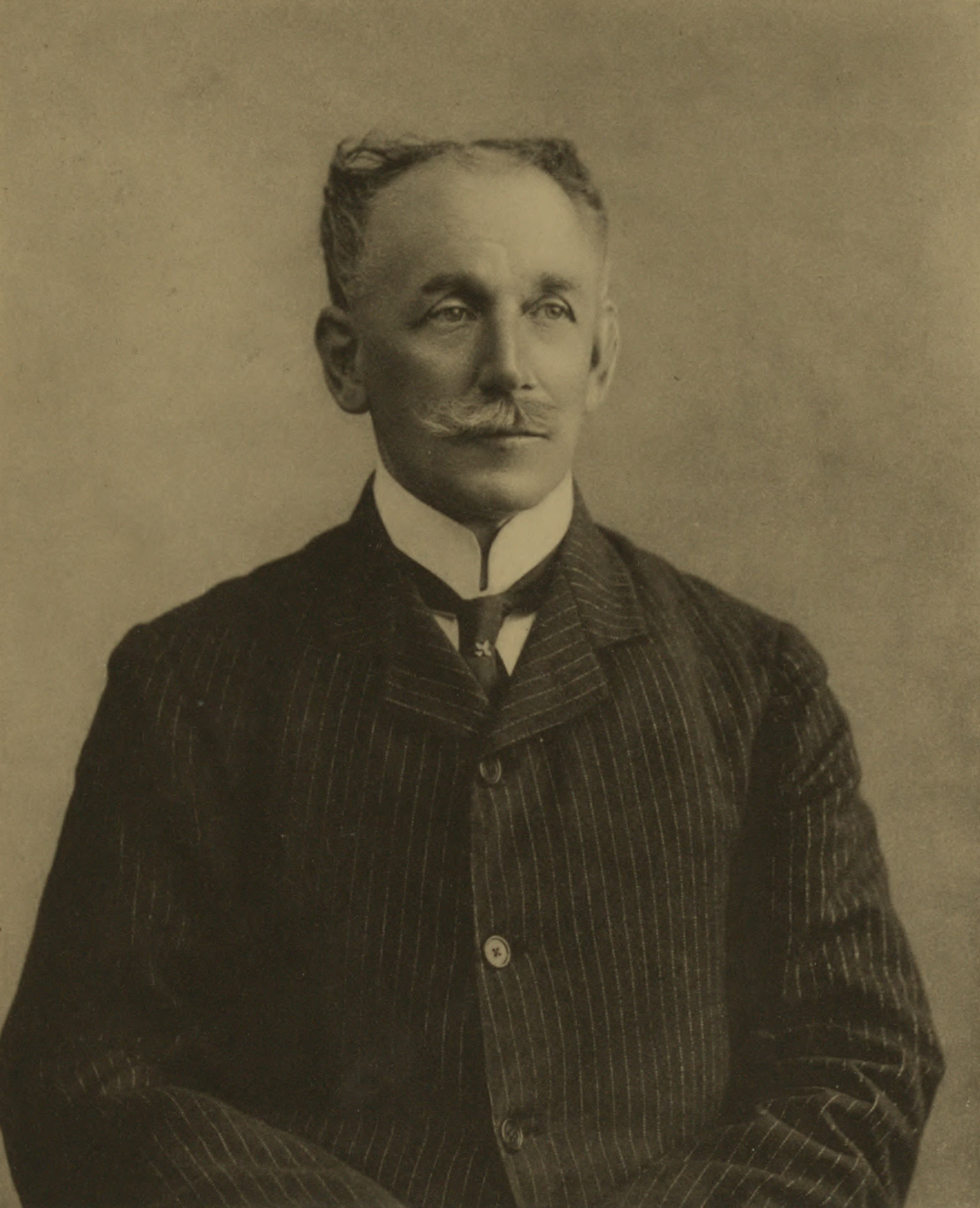
Palmer c. 1917

Sir Elwin Mitford Palmer KCB KCMG (3 March 1852 – 28 January 1906) was a British colonial administrator.

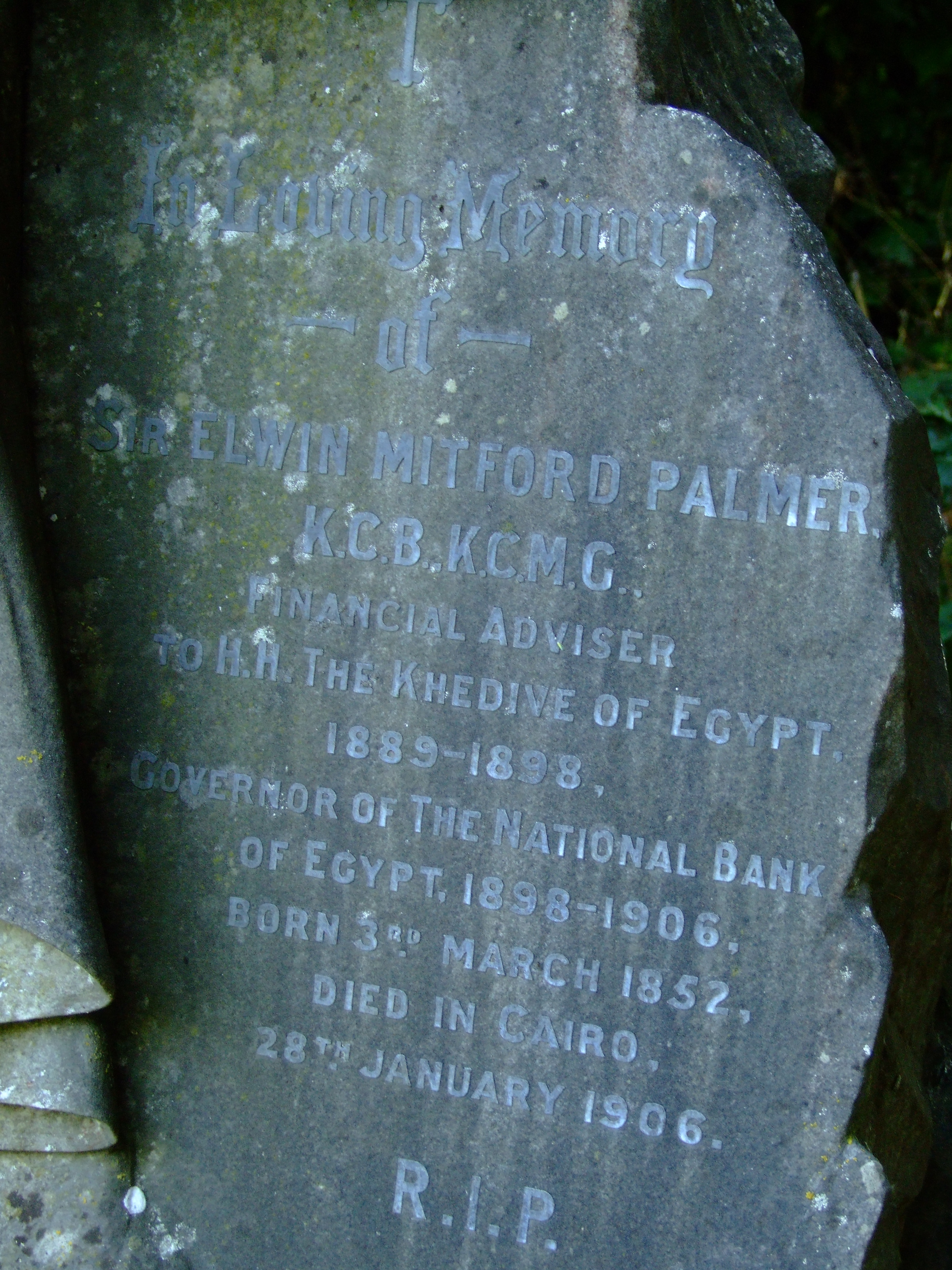
Elwin Palmer's Headstone at Freshwater, Isle of Wight, UK

== Life ==
He was born in London to Edward Palmer and his wife, Caroline. He was educated at Lancing College, Sussex, before joining the financial department of the Indian government in 1871. He became assistant Comptroller-General before leaving India for Egypt in 1855. Here, he succeeded Sir Gerald FitzGerald KCMG as director-general of accounts in Egypt. He was made CMG in 1888 and a year later succeeded Sir Edgar Vincent, 1st Viscount D'Abernon as financial advisor to the Khedive.

Sir Elwin was appointed first governor to the newly created National Bank of Egypt in 1898. In 1902 he was appointed president of the Agricultural Bank of Egypt, a subsidiary of the National Bank. He was made KCMG in 1892 and KCB in 1897 whilst also being awarded the grand cordens of the Osminieh Order and the Order of Medjidie.

He married Mary Augusta Lynch Clogstoun, daughter of Major Herbert Mackworth Clogstoun VC and Mary Julia MacKenzie (a niece of photographer Julia Margaret Cameron), on 27 August 1881 in Madras, India.

He died in Cairo on 28 January 1906.
