= Frobenius Orgelbyggeri =

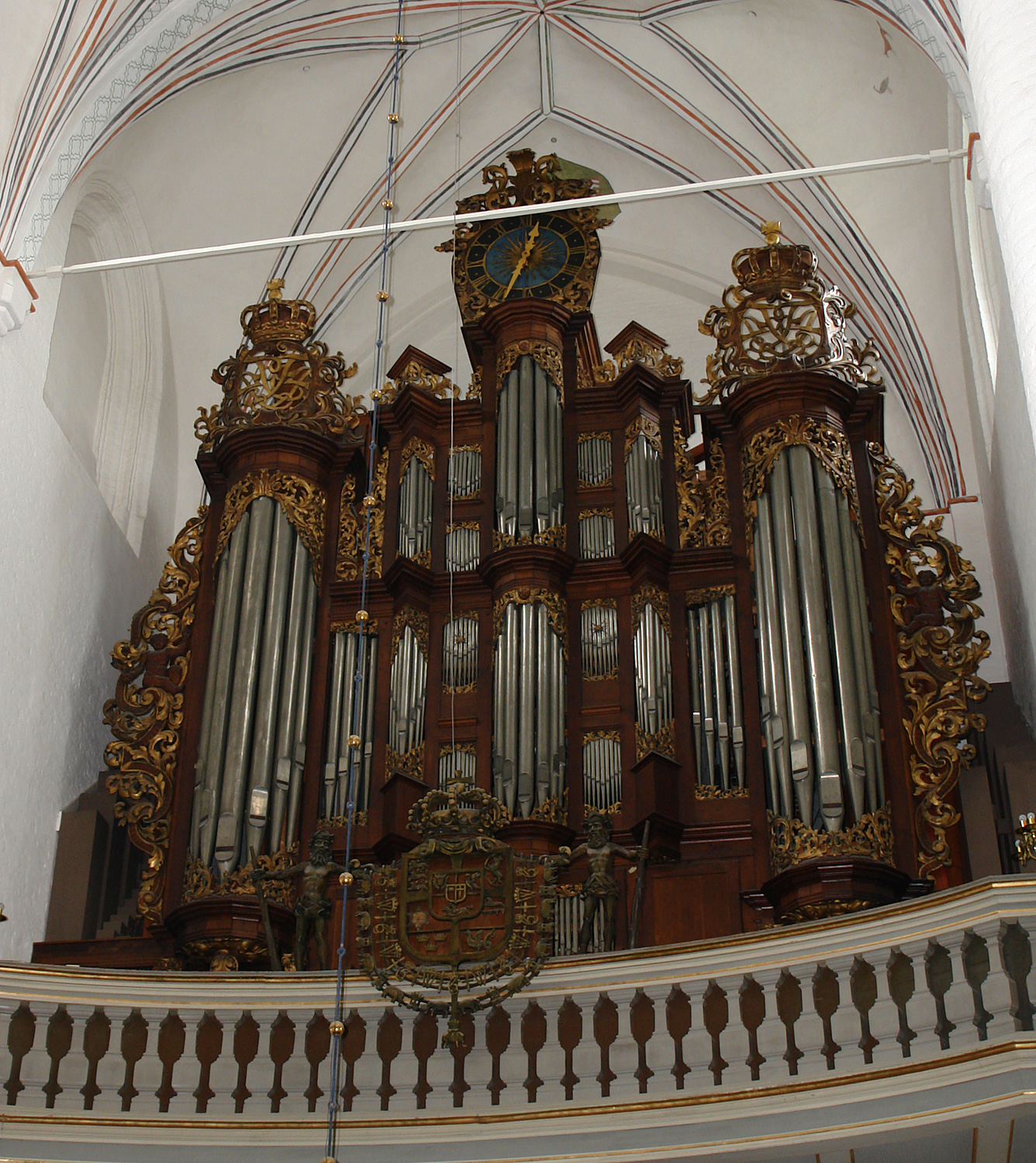
The Frobenius-organ in Aarhus Cathedral

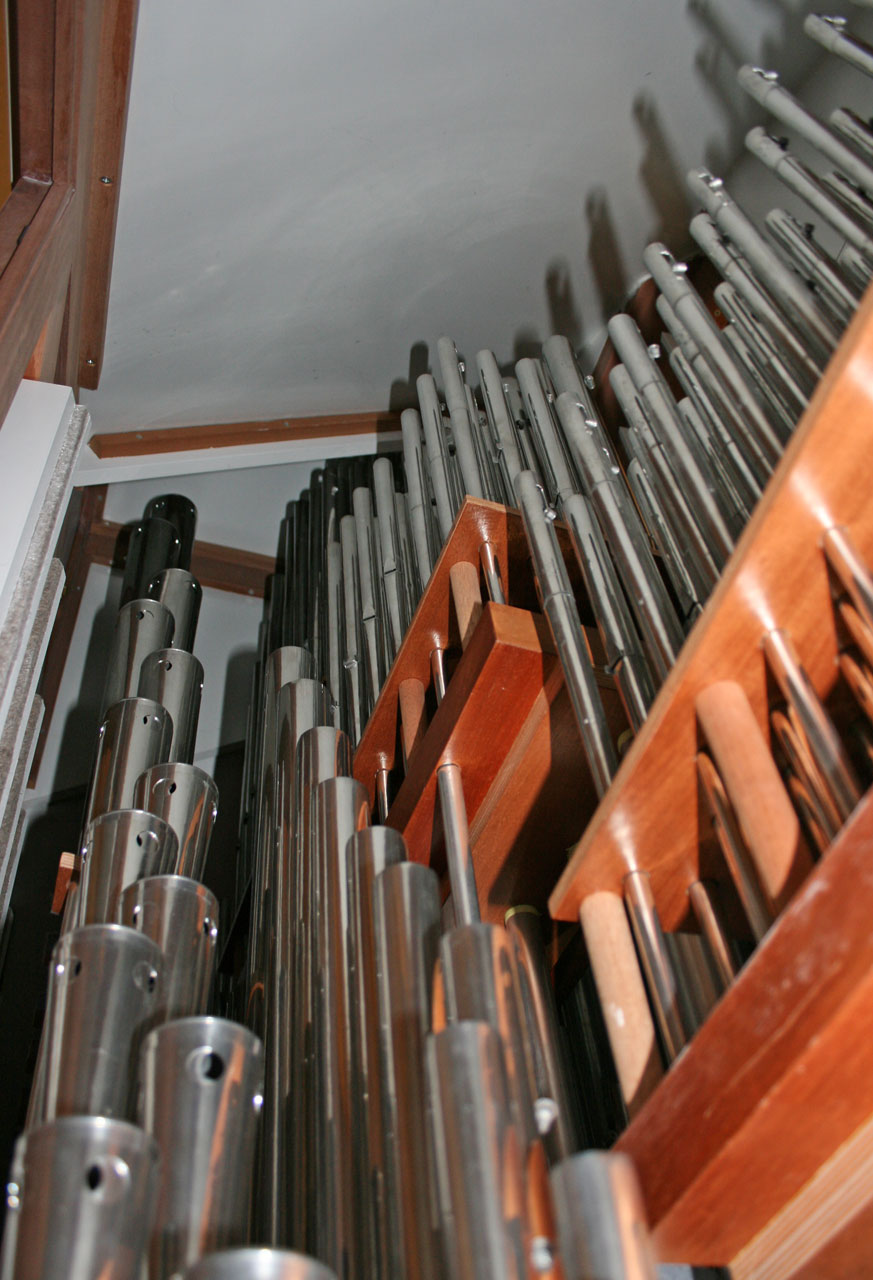
Inside the Frobenius-organ in Jørlunde church

Frobenius is a Danish firm of organ builders.

== History ==
Theodor Frobenius was born into a family of organ builders on 7 October 1885 in Weikersheim, Baden-Württemberg. From the age of 13, he trained as an organ builder at August Laukhuff in his home town. He spent four years in the workshop and then another three and a half years as a journeyman with other German organ builders. He met the Danish organ builder A.C. Zachariassen. In 1907, he moved to Aarhus where Zachariassen had just taken over an organ workshop. Frobenius's original plan was to spend only a year or two in Denmark, but ended up settling in the country on a permanent basis after meeting his future wife while working on the renovation of the organ in Viborg Cathedral.

Frobenius Orgelbyggeri (Th. Frobenius & Sons / Th. Frobenius & Sønner Orgelbyggeri A/S) was founded in Copenhagen by Theodor Frobenius (1885–1972) in 1909. The firm moved to Lyngby in 1925. Theodor's sons Walther and Erik joined the company in 1944, at the same time that they began to build organs in the classical tradition, with mechanical actions and slider windchests. They build organs with characteristic modern casework, usually arranging the pipework of each manual such that three to six repeating arrangements of front pipes are shown in the façade. Their organ development after 1925 was in the style of the Organ Reform Movement and neo-classical design.

== Notable Frobenius organs ==
- Aarhus Cathedral, Denmark, 89 stops (1928-2001) (The largest church organ in Denmark)
- The Queen's College, Oxford, 22 stops (1965)
- Church of the Assumption, Tullamore, Ireland, 53 stops (1965; relocated from Vor Frue Kirke, Copenhagen in 1994)
- First Church Congregational, United Church of Christ, Cambridge, Massachusetts, 40 stops (1972)
- Thisted Kirke, 44 stops (1972)
- Ribe Domkirke, 50 stops (1973/1994)
- St Mortens Kirke, Næstved, 44 stops (1975)
- Vangede Kirke, Gentofte, 40 stops (1979)
- Robinson College, Cambridge, 26 stops (1979)
- Takayama Mahikari Grand Shrine, Japan, 45 stops (1984)
- All Saints Church, Kingston upon Thames, 39 stops (1988)
- Opstandelseskirken, Albertslund, 36 stops (1992)
- Dorfkirche Marienfelde, Berlin, 32 stops (1994)
- Canongate Kirk, Edinburgh, Scotland, 19 stops (1998) (The 1000th organ built by Frobenius)
- Jørlunde Kirke, Denmark, 24 stops (2009) (Tonal design by Frederik Magle)
- Oundle School, England 37 stops (1984)
- Lancing College Chapel, England, 20 stops (1986)
- Pargas church, Finland, 33 stops (1969)

== Other sources ==
- Guy Oldham, Ole Olesen: "Frobenius", Grove Music Online, ed. L. Macy (Accessed 2007-06-25)
- N. Friis: Th. Frobenius & Co 1909–1959 (Kongens Lyngby, 1959)
- P.J. Basch: Frobenius to the Americas, in Music: the AGO and RCCO Magazine VI (1972)
