= Lancing College Chapel =

Coordinates: 50.84667°N 0.30254°W

- Chapel of St Mary and St Nicolas, Lancing
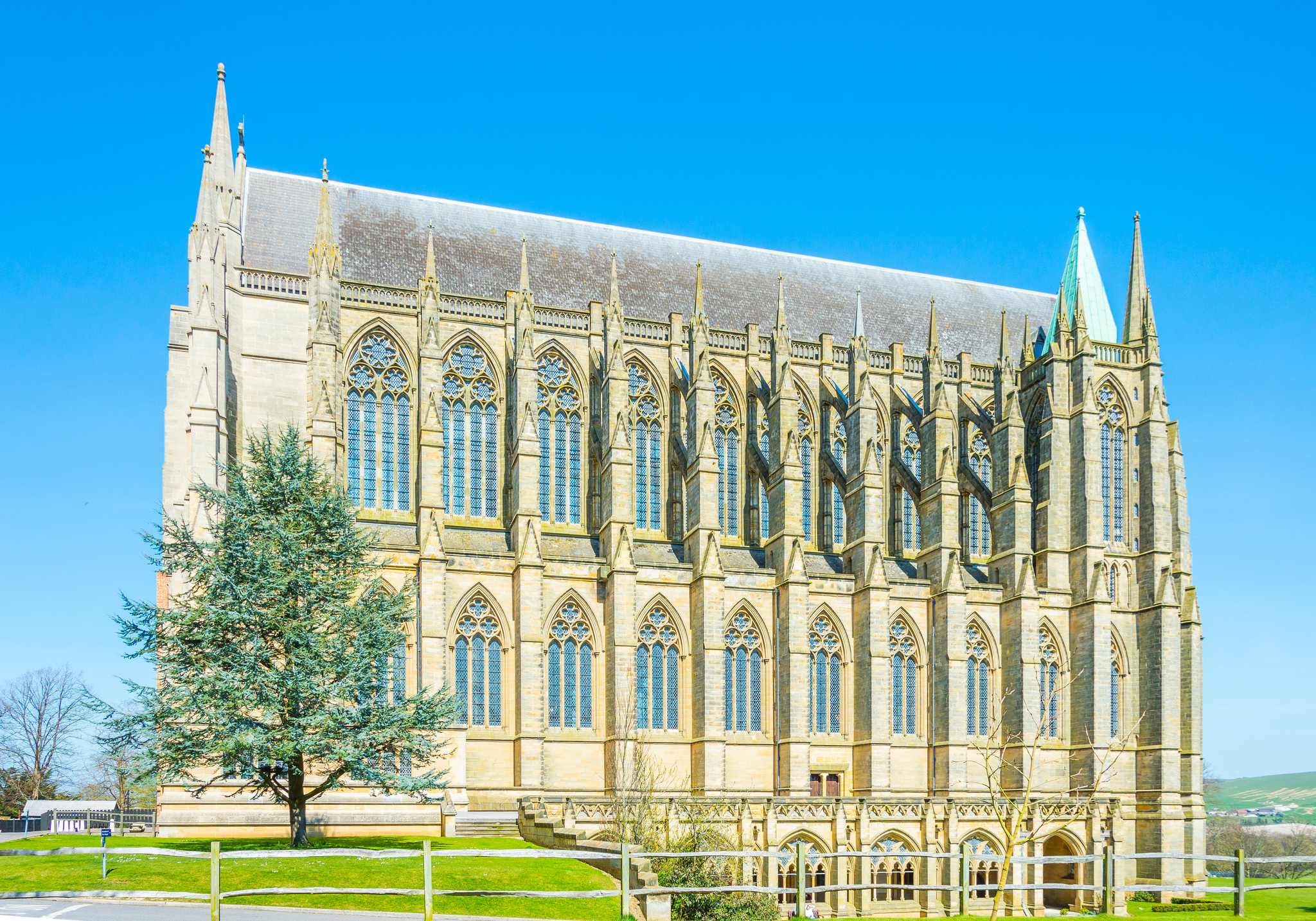
- Lancing College Chapel
- OS grid reference: TQ 19608 06609
- Location: Lancing, West Sussex
- Country: England
- Denomination: Church of England
- Churchmanship: High Church
- Website: Lancing College Website

History
- Founded: 1848
- Founder: Nathaniel Woodard
- Dedication: St Mary and St Nicolas
- Dedicated: 1978 by Archbishop Coggan

Architecture
- Architect: R.H. Carpenter/William Slater
- Style: Gothic Revival with French Influences
- Years built: 1868 to 1977
- Groundbreaking: 1868
- Completed: 2021

Specifications
- Height: 90 ft (27 m)

Lancing College Chapel is the chapel to Lancing College in West Sussex, England, and is an example of Gothic Revival architecture. The chapel was designed by R.H. Carpenter and William Slater. The foundation stone of the chapel was laid in 1868, and the crypt was dedicated on 26 October 1875, whereupon the college began to use it for worship. Structural difficulties and chronic lack of funds meant that it was another forty-three years before the upper chapel was ready for use; the chapel was consecrated and dedicated to St Mary and St Nicolas in 1911. Even then it was unfinished. A proposed tower was abandoned, and the west wall was covered in corrugated iron.

The chapel is built of Sussex sandstone from Scaynes Hill in West Sussex. It is a Grade I listed building and the largest school chapel in the world.

A stained-glass window was commissioned in memory of Trevor Huddleston OL, and consecrated by Desmond Tutu on 22 May 2007.

== Architecture ==
Lancing College Chapel is one of the tallest interior-vaulted churches in the United Kingdom. The apex of the vaulting rises to 90 ft (27.4m) above the floor. The original plans called for a tower at the north side and the foundations for it were laid but not used; the tower would have raised the height to well over 300 ft (90m). The chapel design is based on 13th-century English Gothic, with French influences. It follows a standard English Gothic plan, with a triforium and a very high clerestory. The French influences are noticeable not just in the massive clerestory, but also in the apse and the massive rose window on the west end. The rose window, designed by Stephen Dykes Bower, was completed in 1977, and is the largest rose window in England, being 32 ft in diameter. A stained glass window was commissioned in memory of Trevor Huddleston OL; it was consecrated by Desmond Tutu on 22 May 2007. The unfinished west end of the chapel, which had remained bricked up since 1978, was completed in the summer of 2021 with the addition of an open three-arched porch designed by Michael Drury, following a successful fundraising campaign by the Friends of Lancing Chapel.

The tomb of the founder of the school, Nathaniel Woodard is a prominent feature. Woodard had insisted that the chapel be built to its full height at one end first, so that if he died before completion the height could not be cut down to save money.

Inside can be found three organs. The eastern organ is a two-manual mechanical organ by the Danish firm Frobenius; it was installed and voiced in situ in 1986. That year also marked the completion of the rebuild of the four-manual Walker organ at the west end of the chapel – both organs were showcased in an opening concert by the American organ virtuoso, Carlo Curley.

The chapel was closed to visitors during the coronavirus pandemic and, subsequently, during the completion of the west end porch and refurbishment work on the school kitchens opposite, reopening to the public on 25 April 2022.

The Friends of Lancing Chapel (Registered Charity No. 241403) are committed to maintain, conserve and enhance the chapel for future generations.

== Gallery ==
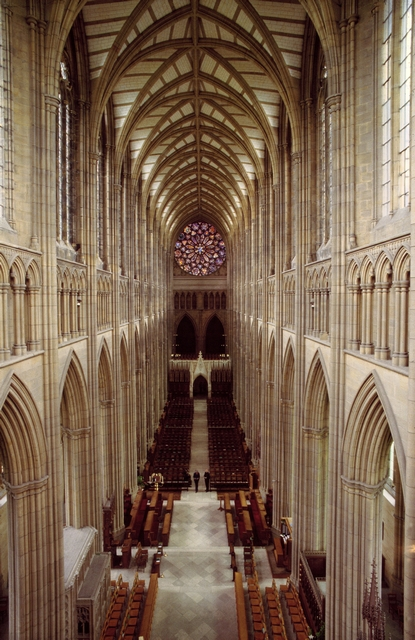
The chapel as seen from the Triforium

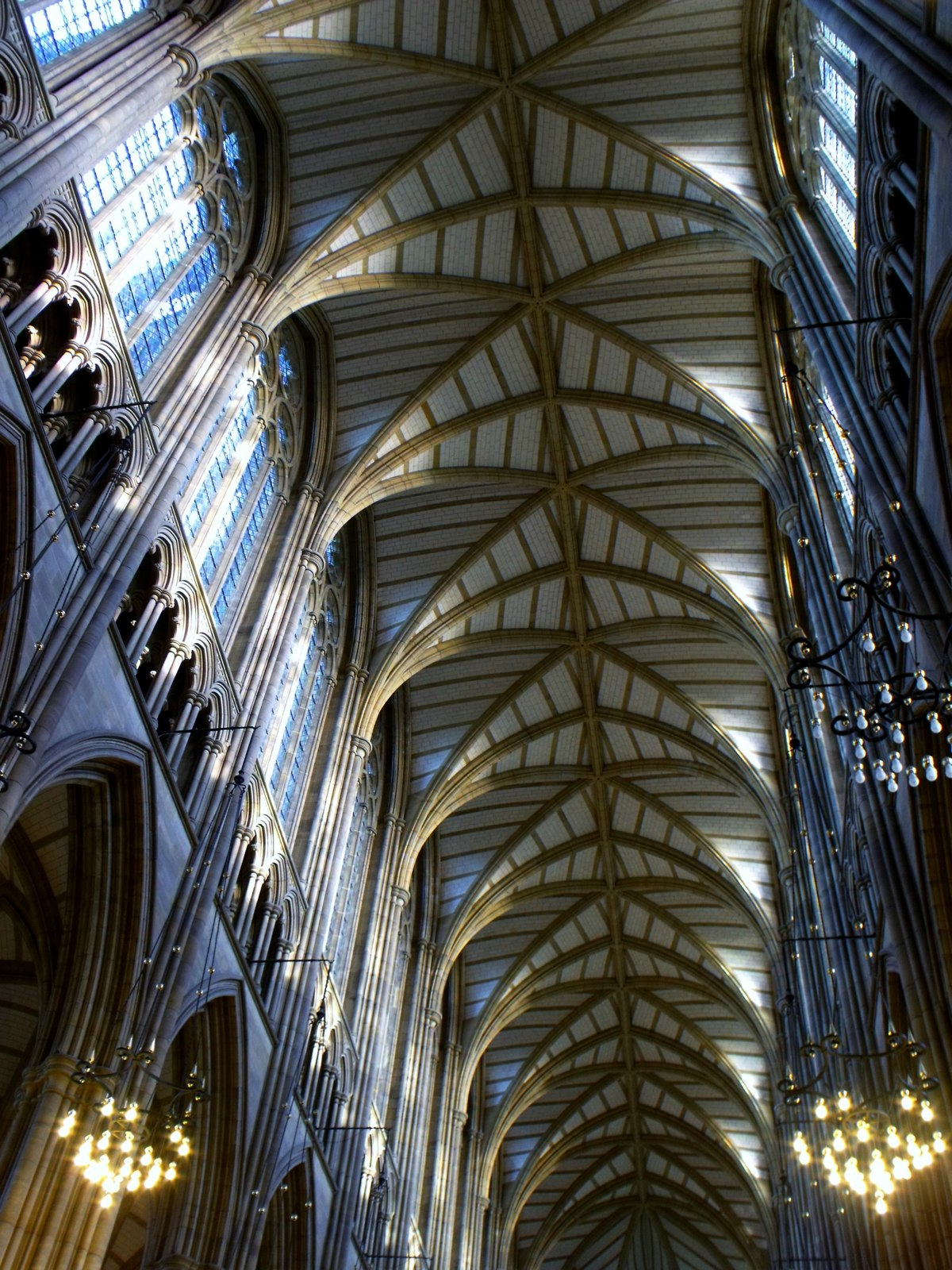
The vaulted roof

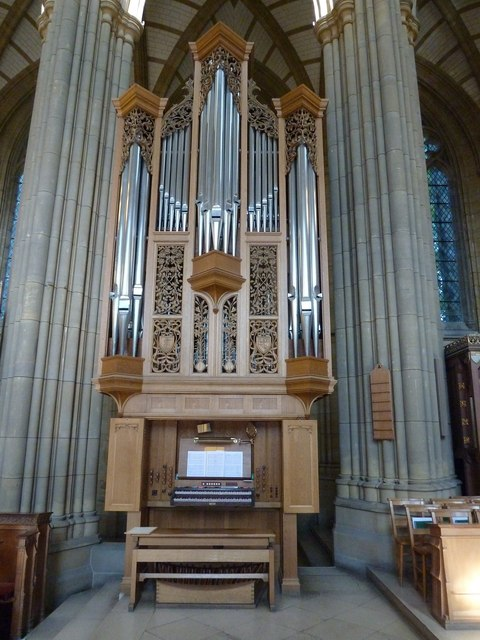
The chapel organ

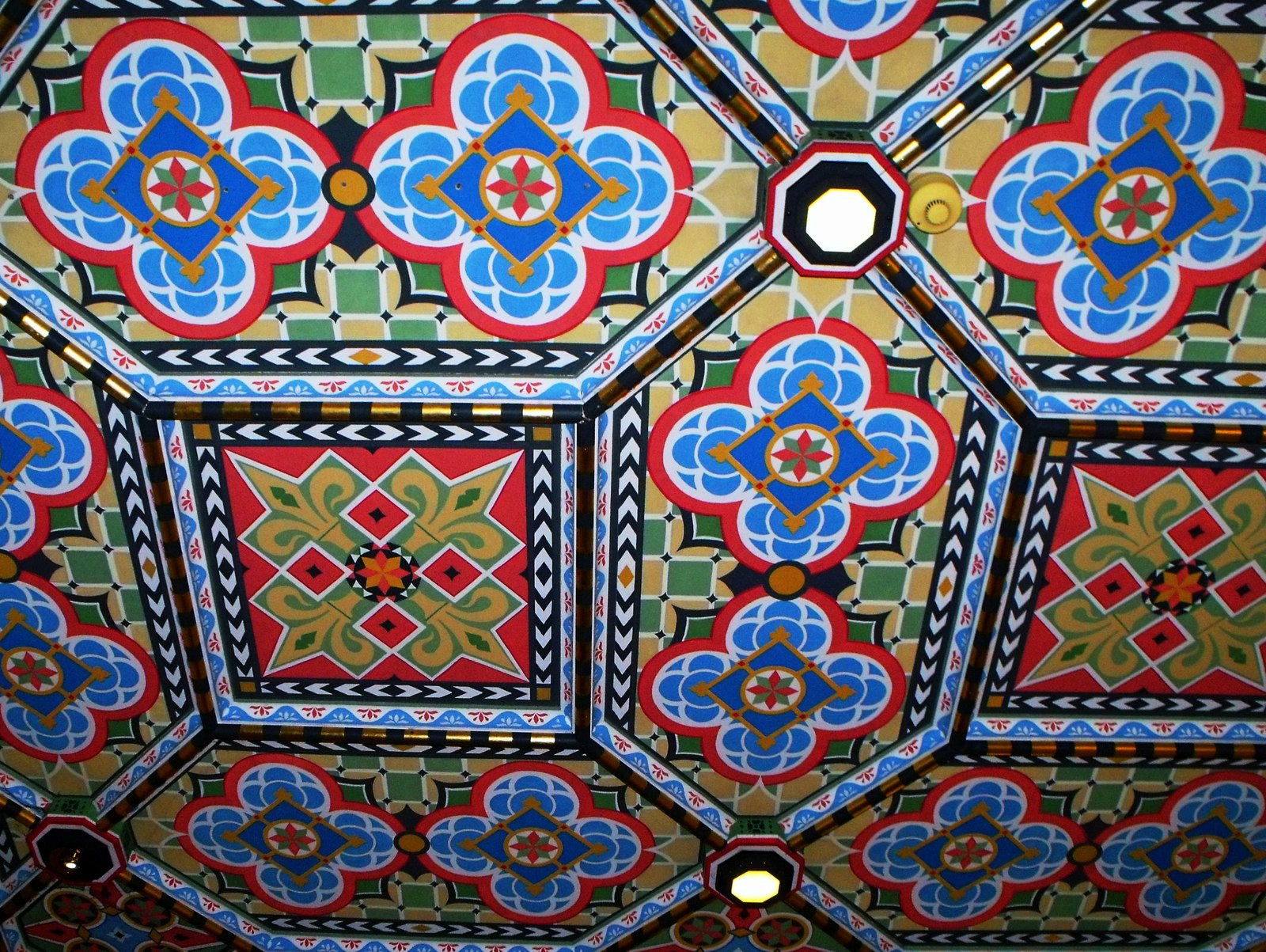
Painted roof

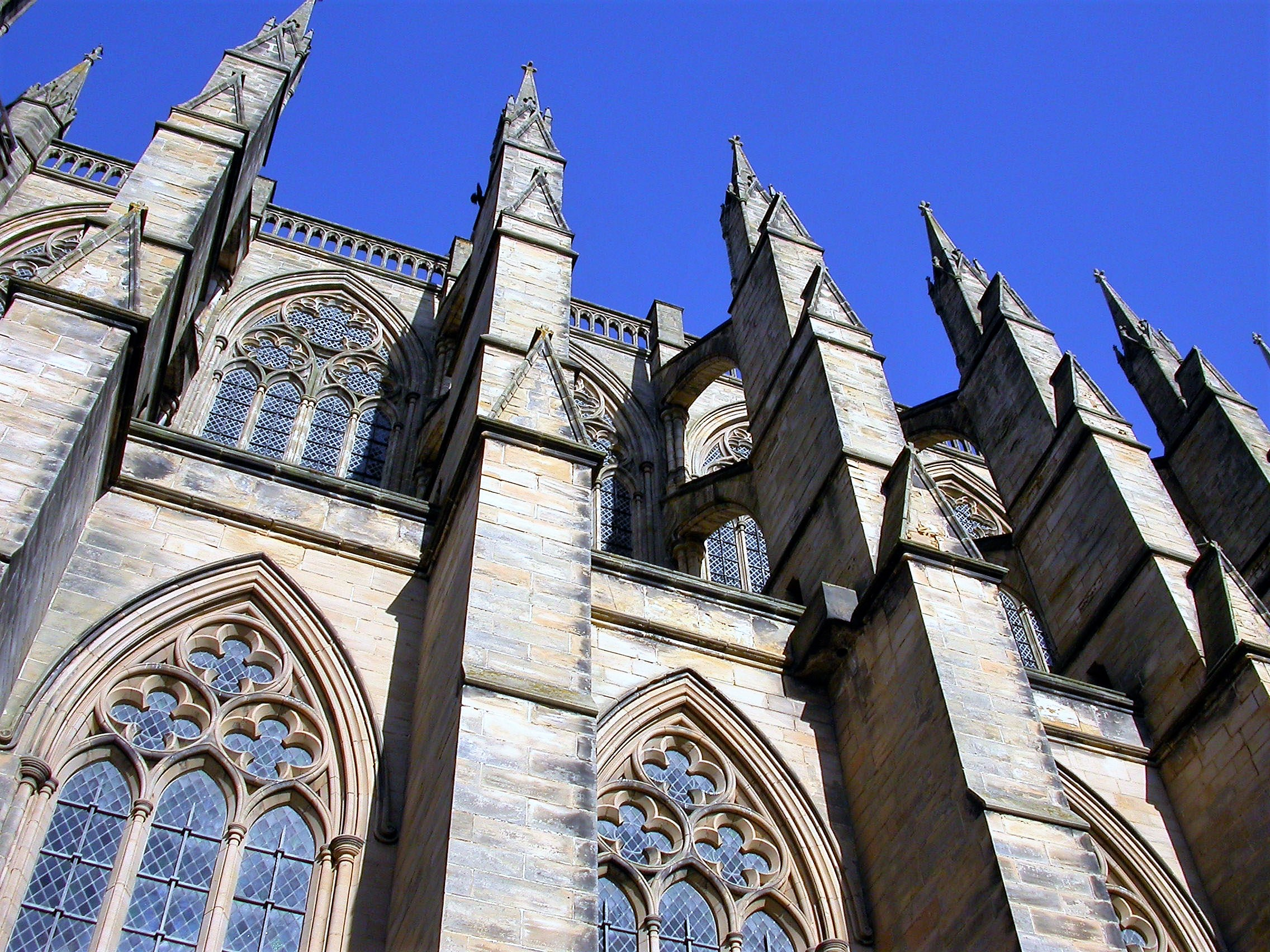
Flying buttresses

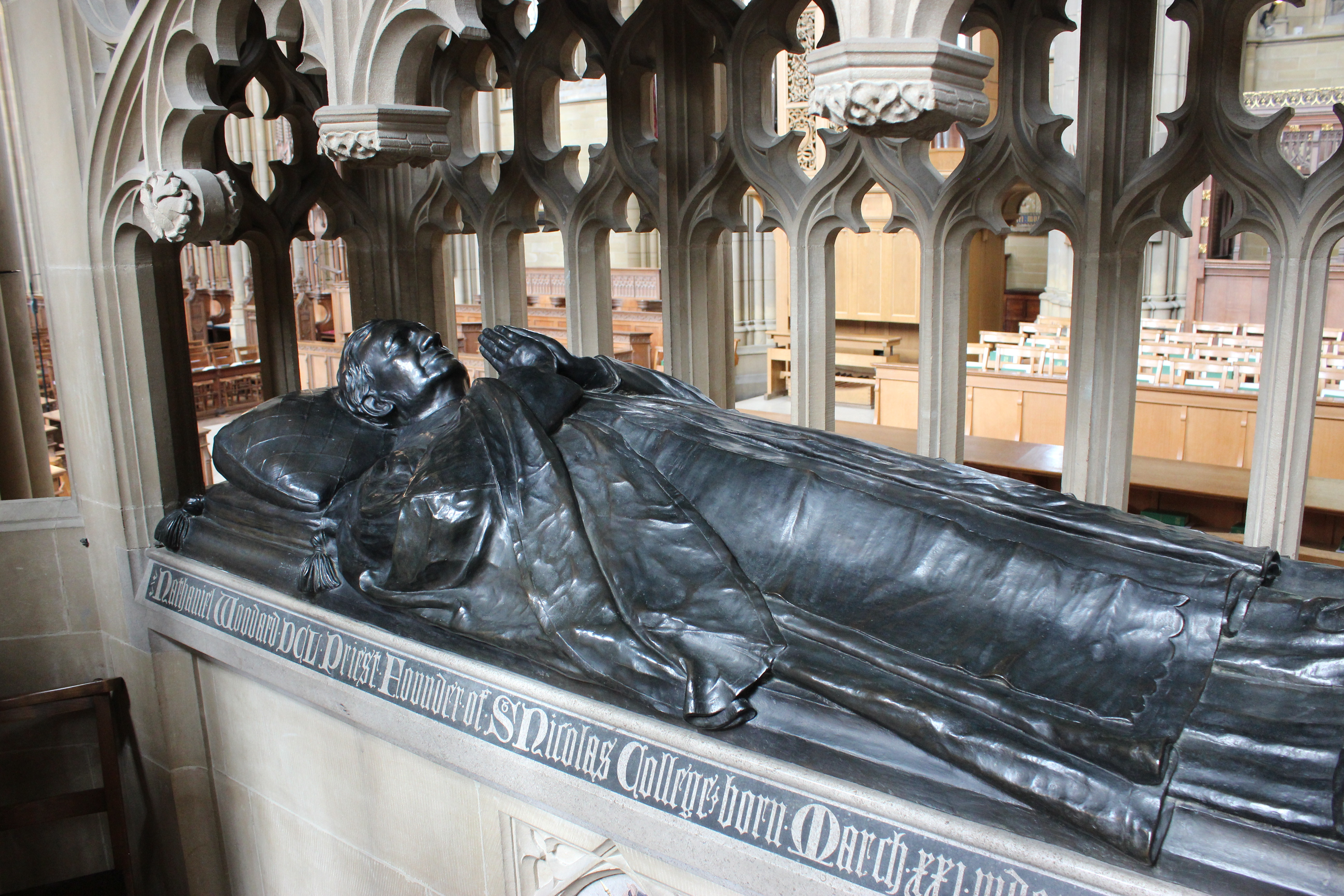
Tomb of Nathaniel Woodard in the chapel

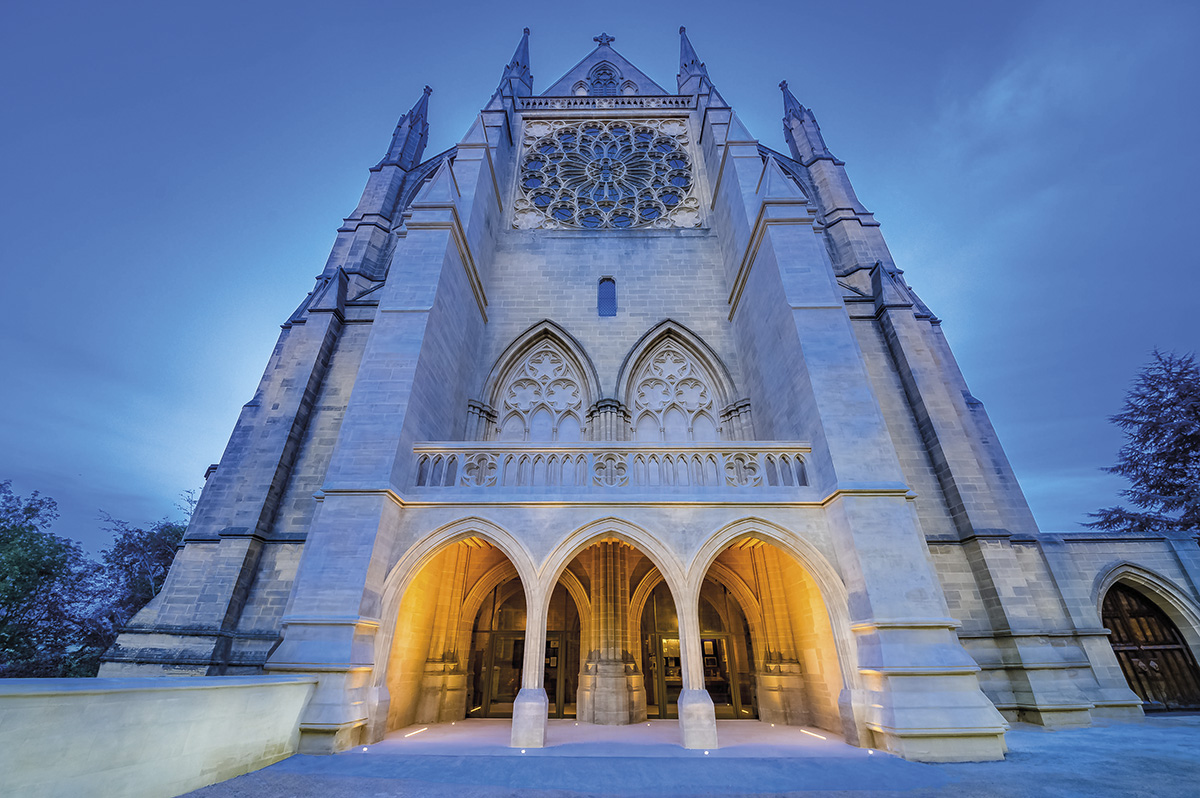
The completed west porch
