= Rajnarayan Chandavarkar =

Indian historian

- Born: 1953
- Died: 23 April 2006 (aged 53)
- Education: Trinity College, Cambridge
- Scientific career
- Fields: History

Rajnarayan Chandavarkar (1953 – 23 April 2006) was a reader in the history and politics of South Asia and fellow at Trinity College, Cambridge.

== Background ==
Chandavarkar's work engaged most directly with the processes involved in the formation of the industrial working classes in Mumbai. He worked toward defining a new interdisciplinary approach for understanding processes of urbanisation, the nexus between the city and the countryside, and the evolution of industrial capitalism. His insights prompted research on a wide range of topics in South Asian social history and politics. This was particularly evident in the work of the research students whom he supervised at Cambridge. A new generation of scholars, who now work in India, the United Kingdom, Israel, Japan, the United States and Canada owes much of its achievements to his mentorship. As a participant in seminars at Cambridge, in international conferences, and in other forms of academic gatherings, he provided inspiration for scholars in fields far removed from his own.

Chandavarkar grew up in Bombay before going to England for his advanced education. He completed the final years of his schooling at Lancing College in West Sussex. The rest of his academic career was closely connected to the University of Cambridge in England and to the city of Mumbai. He did his undergraduate studies at Gonville and Caius College from 1973 to 1976, where he was deeply influenced by Gareth Stedman Jones, his undergraduate supervisor. He went on to finish his PhD under the direction of Anil Seal at Trinity College, Cambridge. He became a fellow at Trinity in 1979, and remained associated with the college until his death. He has also served as the director of the Centre for South Asian Studies at Cambridge since 2001. Despite his lifelong association with Cambridge, he maintained strong ties with India, retaining his Indian citizenship, returning frequently to visit and do research, and participating directly in circles related to his intellectual interests, his social commitments and cricket.

Beginning his research on Mumbai during the late 1970s, he quickly developed a strong command over the resources available in libraries such as the India Office Library, the Maharashtra State Archives and the Mumbai Police Archives. While he devoured historical materials, he never worshipped 'facts'. He interrogated his records, deconstructed evidence critically, and sought to unravel the wider social and political processes his data revealed. He thus moved far beyond the narrow confinement of a straightforward "empiricism". Nonetheless he was suspicious of any research not based upon the rigorous analysis of archival materials, and he exhorted his students to ground themselves solidly in their sources.

Rajnarayan Chandavarkar died of a sudden heart attack on 23 April 2006 at the Dartmouth–Hitchcock Medical Center in Lebanon, New Hampshire, USA. He had been attending a conference at nearby Dartmouth College. At the time of his death, he was fifty-two years old.

== Publications ==
Publications based upon his dissertation research began to appear in the early 1980s, and scholars of Mumbai's history awaited his study of the city and its working class with considerable anticipation. When The Origins of Industrial Capitalism (1994) first appeared in 1994, it was regarded with a sense of admiration, even awe, in some circles. The book was characterised by formidable research and represented a depth of local historical knowledge that went beyond anything that existed in the labour history of South Asia at the time. Origins challenged many existing interpretations; indeed it questioned the assumptions of what working class history should be. The study reached beyond the industrial workplace and trade unions into the larger informal economy of Mumbai, into the neighbourhoods where workers lived, and out to the rural areas, such as Ratnagiri and the Deccan, from which workers originated. The origins of capitalism, in Chandavarkar's view, lay not just in the initiatives of a few captains of industry but in a host of social forces that all played an active part in shaping the new economic structures of late colonial Mumbai.

Origins was followed in 1998 by Imperial Power and Popular Politics. This was a diverse range of essays on industrial capitalism, workers' politics, the police in Mumbai, the plague, colonial discourse and the nature of the colonial state. Some of these essays were as rich empirically as Origins, while others were thought-provoking interpretive pieces.

== Contributions ==
Together these two books and related articles set out coherent and fundamentally new ways of thinking about the history of western India and its economy. First, Chandavarkar's work offered new understandings of the processes of industrialisation and capitalist transformation. Rather than see the development of large-scale production as a simple matter of technological diffusion from Europe to India or as evidence of the triumph of entrepreneurial pioneers, Chandavarkar placed this process squarely within a historical context conditioned by imperialism, rural poverty, insecure markets, and the agency of workers. He argued that the formation of factories was often a risk-minimizing effort by almost marginal figures in the nineteenth century economy, men who were in positions of subordination to foreign businessmen in the export trades, who faced constant difficulties in mobilising capital, and who rushed around from one form of investment to another in hopes of making quick profits in this uncertain business climate. Chandavarkar especially highlighted the role of the workforce in conditioning the form of industrial capitalism in Mumbai. He saw industrialists and workers as participating in a common theatre of interaction; both sets of actors constrained the other's behaviour. Labour recruitment needs and workers' resistances consistently limited the power of capitalists to develop uniform policies that might have maximised profits; the strategies of industrialists served to promote divisions among their workers.

A second set of contributions in these studies lay in their analysis of the social organisation of the working class. He looked at social formations ranging from the workplace to urban neighbourhoods to the workers' rural-urban connections. His research went beyond most previous studies of labour, which had often attempted to identify some kind of solid, enduring structure – whether caste, class, or place of origin – as the essence of working-class society. Chandavarkar viewed workers as involved in an extremely heterogeneous and constantly shifting set of relationships. For example, he thoroughly questioned the dominance of jobbers in working-class society, thus calling into question a major orthodoxy of labour history. He demonstrated that jobbers in Mumbai competed with other figures in workers' neighbourhoods, and their power was limited by their need to satisfy the requirements of their clients. Chandavarkar also argued that there was no straightforward tendency for class-based social ties to develop in the context of industrial employment. Indeed, the characteristics of the workplace and the competition of various leaderships for followings could produce new divisions as well as new unities. In its case for the diffuse, fragile and continuously changing character of social organisation, Chandavarkar's scholarship had profound implications for understanding urban society in South Asia more generally.

The third major area of contribution in these books concerned their understanding of working-class politics. Chandavarkar's work stretched beyond the usual studies of labour politics in that it explored not just workers' participation in trade unions and the Communist Party but also their involvement with the full range of groups and parties with which they became affiliated. This approach allowed him to question views that interpreted political developments as evidence of the continuous evolution of "class consciousness" or that, conversely, sought to explain the failure of workers to develop such commitments. Chandavarkar argued persuasively that workers' political affiliations and identities, including those of class, were dynamic and shifting, and were constantly being constructed in changing political contexts. As circumstances changed, workers moved between support for communist, nationalist and communalist organisations, between expressions of extensive activism and relative passivity.

== "Class" and "Culture" ==
The most controversial aspect of Origins and Imperial Power was perhaps their treatment of "culture". Chandavarkar reacted against approaches that attributed workers' behaviours to "traditional" commitments rooted in rural India. He insisted, for instance, that the maintenance of rural connections should be seen as a strategy for subsistence by workers rather than as evidence of emotional attachments held over from an earlier period. His dissatisfaction with any static representation of workers' culture led him to be a strong critic of some of the members of the Subaltern Studies group. Writing perhaps his most polemical piece in 1997, he insisted:

“Caste and kinship ties were vital to the social organization of workers: but so were the affinities of region and religion, workplace and neighbourhood, trade unions and political parties, all of which cut across each other. To insist that the culture of migrant workers was characterized by ‘strong primordial ties of community, language, religion, caste and kinship’ is to obscure the extent to which their interaction produced something quite different and it is to remain blind to the extent to which their ‘culture’ was also informed by work and by politics, and indeed, by the daily struggles of workplace and neighbourhood" (Chandavarkar 1997, p. 187).

But as historical research continued to develop more dynamic portraits of working class culture and identity, and as his own scholarship sought to appreciate the growth in enthusiasm on the part of workers for movements of regional chauvinism and communalism, Chandavarkar increasingly acknowledged the role of cultural phenomena and processes in his work and he encouraged his students to deal seriously with cultural issues.

Chandavarkar's most important recent work is his introduction (2004) to One Hundred Years, One Hundred Voices: The Millworkers of Girangaon, Neera Adarkar and Meena Menon’s wonderful oral history of the Girangaon neighbourhood in Mumbai. This long essay proved to be far more than an ordinary introduction; it was an original work of research and a sweeping history of the working class in the city from the 1880s to the 1980s that may long remain the standard work on the subject. The essay focused primarily on the transformations of working class allegiances over time, from the height of trade union and Communist activity to the Samyukta Maharashtra and Shiv Sena movements to the Great Strike of 1982. Drawing upon the accounts provided by Adarkar and Menon, it offered a multifaceted explanation for these developments that addressed the rich popular culture of Girangaon, the role of capitalists, the appeals and strategies of different political parties and leaderships, and the workers' own actions and interests. The essay also highlighted the increasing political impotence of workers after 1982. It is probably the work that best reflects the evolution of Chandavarkar's scholarship in recent years. However, several other publications were still in process at the time of his death, including a Modern Asian Studies special issue on labour history he was editing (in which he will have an individual contribution on the decline of jobbers in Mumbai) and a long essay on colonialism and democracy. In recent years, he had become increasingly interested in the larger history of Mumbai. Less than twenty-four hours before his death, he gave a brilliant paper on the city from the seventeenth century to the present in the conference at Dartmouth. Other writing, unfortunately, was probably not so far along, and we fear that much of Chandavarkar's voluminous research in many different areas may now go unpublished.

== Legacy ==
Chandavarkar mentored about eighteen research students. His intense personality and critical engagement with students' work could be initially overpowering for his tutees. However, his forceful communication of criticism might have enabled students to develop their ideas more fruitfully while forming richer research insights. His engagement in iconoclasm could have facilitated their abilities to question received wisdom about historical theories, and his extensive engagement with archival material might have prepared them to treat evidence in original ways.

Chandavarkar's influence is reflected in research by his students in such diverse fields as the politics of the urban poor in the towns of Uttar Pradesh; the interplay of gender, class and community among jute workers in Bengal; and the shifting patterns of community formation and the development of Communism in Malabar. Many of his students explored labour history in the context of new perspectives such as the relationship between nationalism and labour radicalism in Solapur, comparisons between Bengal's jute workers and Dundee's working classes in the context of British imperialism, and the meaning of class in the context of popular movements in the jute mill towns outside Calcutta. Others explored wider fields, including the language of politics and the ideological predilections of nationalists in Uttar Pradesh, and the concerns of the urban middle class in Gujarat during the colonial period. A recent study of communalism in contemporary Ahmedabad sought to unravel the wider theoretical underpinnings of the role of ethnicity in politics. Others of his students have examined the making of regional identity in Orissa, the politics of Tamil Muslims, and childhood and child labour in India. Through his students Chandavarkar not only mentored a new cohort of historians but stimulated scholarship in wide-ranging and eclectic fields, embracing the most diverse aspects of South Asian history.

On a more amusing note Chandavarkar had a reputation as a draconian taskmaster. Academic life in Cambridge was rich with the folklore of Chandavarkar's interesting and complex ways of handling his students. Indeed, according to rumour, one student of Chandavarkar hid under a bridge to evade him and another calibrated her movement in Trinity College by spotting his car. For his part Chandavarkar jokingly blamed his students for his proverbial ever-receding hairline. However, his students' loyalty and deeply held affection for their supervisor created lasting bonds between them and their intellectual mentor. He warned them not to rush for the most fashionable product in the market, and he encouraged them to explore beyond what is apparent. This serious, critical spirit of enquiry and refusal to compromise his own firmly held convictions remains a lasting legacy of Chandavarkar.

== Other Links ==
- Trinity College, Cambridge
- Centre of South Asian Studies, University of Cambridge
- Social Science Research Council Memoriam by Itty Abraham
- Tribute by Dilip D'Souza
