= List of ambassadors of the United Kingdom to Slovenia =

The ambassador of the United Kingdom to Slovenia is the United Kingdom's foremost diplomatic representative in Slovenia, in charge of the UK's diplomatic mission. The official title is His Britannic Majesty's Ambassador to the Republic of Slovenia. The embassy is located in the TR3 building at Republic Square, Ljubljana.

Slovenia split from Yugoslavia in June 1991. The members of the European Union recognised Slovenia as an independent state on 15 January 1992 and member countries, including the UK, then appointed ambassadors.

== Ambassadors to Slovenia ==
- 1992–1997: Gordon Johnston OBE
- 1997–2000: David Lloyd OBE
- 2001–2005: Hugh Mortimer LVO
- 2005–2009: Timothy Simmons CVO
- 2009–2013: Andrew Page
- 2014–2015: Christopher Yvon (chargé d'affaires)
- 2015–2020: Sophie Honey MBE
- 2020–August 2024: Tiffany Sadler
- From 2024: Victoria Harrison
