= List of people educated at Hurstpierpoint College =

Hurstpierpoint College is an independent, co-educational, day and boarding school for pupils aged 4–18, located just to the north of the village of Hurstpierpoint, West Sussex. The College was founded in 1849 by Canon Nathaniel Woodard and is a member of the Woodard Corporation.

== Notable Old Johnians ==
=== Politics ===
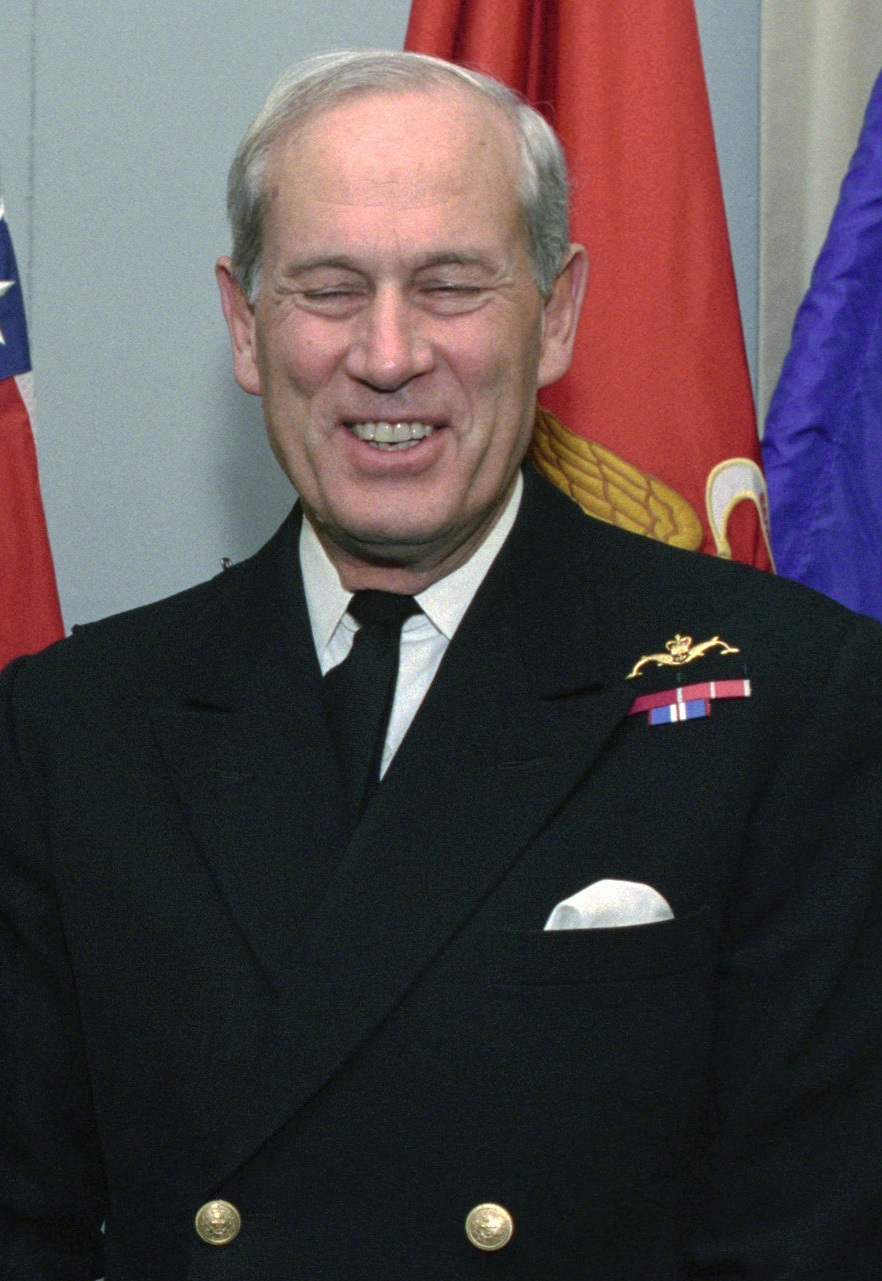
Former Chief of Defence Staff and First Sea Lord Michael Boyce, Baron Boyce

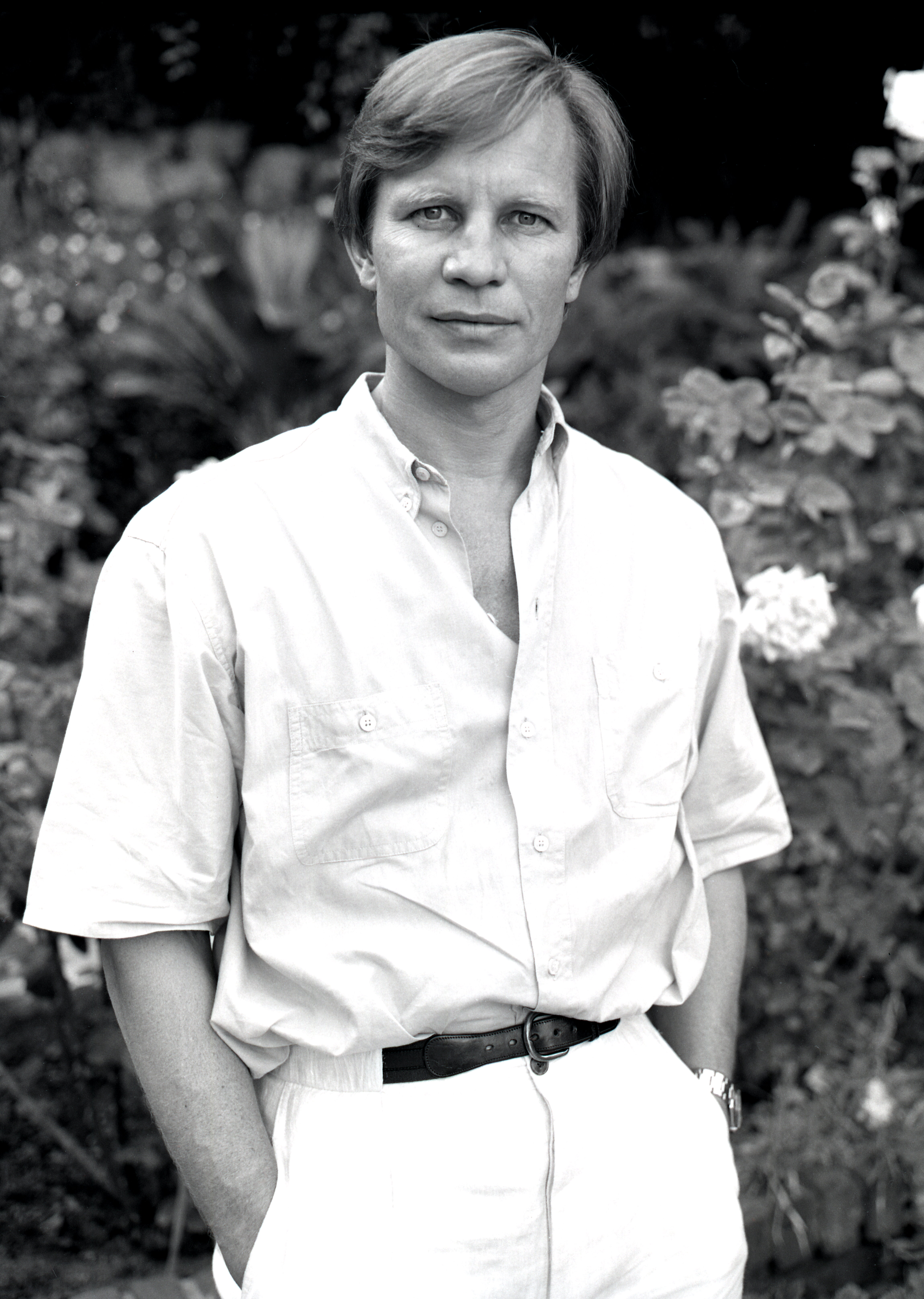
Actor Michael York

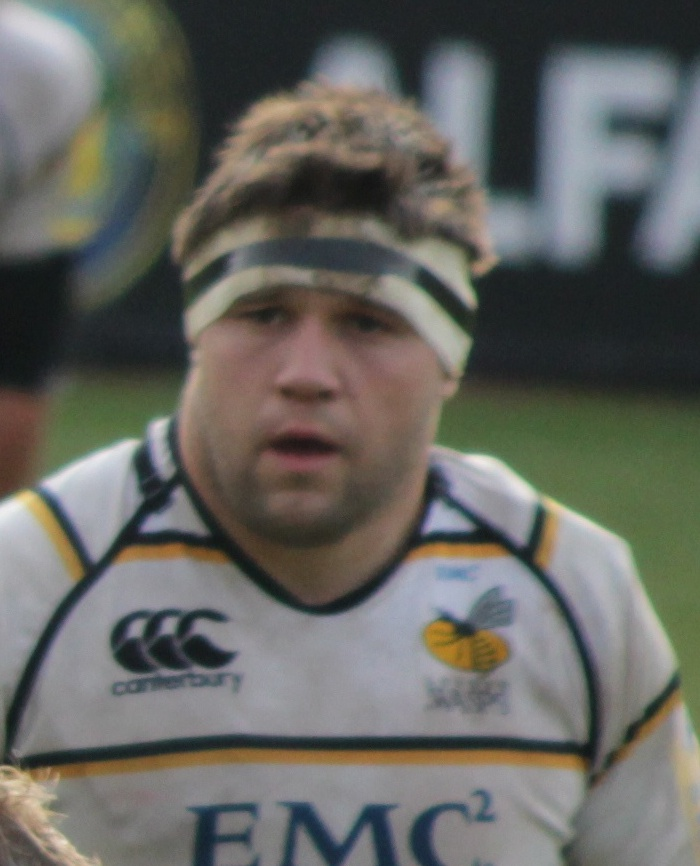
Wales rugby player Ben Broster

Archbishop of Yukon Walter Adams

- Eric Broadbridge, 2nd Baron Broadbridge, hereditary peer
- Peter Broadbridge, 3rd Baron Broadbridge, Crossbench peer
- Roger Casale, Labour Member of Parliament
- George Johnson, Member of the Newfoundland House of Assembly
- Richard Page, Conservative Member of Parliament
- Sir Desmond Plummer, Baron Plummer of St Marylebone, Conservative peer
- John Greenwood Shipman, Liberal Member of Parliament

=== Diplomatic Service ===
- Sir Graham Boyce, British Ambassador to Egypt, British Ambassador to Qatar and British Ambassador to Kuwait
- Sir Bryan Cartledge, British Ambassador to Russia, British Ambassador to Hungary and Principal of Linacre College, Oxford
- Sir Derek Day, British High Commissioner to Canada, British Ambassador to Ethiopia and Olympic bronze medal winning field hockey player
- Sir Oliver Forster, British Ambassador to Pakistan
- Richard Lavers, British Ambassador to Ecuador and British Ambassador to Guatemala

=== Military ===
- Sir Roy Austen-Smith, Commander British Forces Cyprus
- Michael Boyce, Baron Boyce, First Sea Lord (1998–2001), Chief of Defence Staff (2001–2003), and Crossbench peer
- Richard Hutton Davies, army officer
- Sydney Dowse, POW escapee
- H. Dormer Legge, RAF and Army officer and philatelist
- Simon Pack, Royal Marines officer
- Desmond Ruchwaldy, RAF flying ace of the Second World War
- Richard Stevens, RAF flying ace of the Second World War
- Alex Taylor, Director, Army Legal Services Branch.

=== Media and arts ===
- Gavin Carr, conductor
- Tony Church, Shakespearean actor
- Robert Coote, actor
- Christopher Ellison, actor
- Dominic Ferris, pianist and conductor
- Douglas Goldring, writer and journalist
- Richard Hadfield, singer
- Edward Hibbert, actor and agent
- Sean Li, Hong Kong film actor
- Bertram Mitford, novelist
- Ronald Neame, film director
- Barry Norman, film critic
- Christopher Nourse, arts administrator
- H. A. Saintsbury, actor and playwright
- Tom Sutcliffe, opera critic
- Jamie Theakston, television and radio presenter
- Reginald Turner, author and member of the circle of Oscar Wilde
- John Ware, BBC Panorama reporter
- Patrick Wilson, composer
- Michael York, actor

=== Sport ===
- Ben Broster, Wales and Biarritz Olympique rugby player
- Noah Cato, Newcastle Falcons rugby player
- Daniel Doram, Netherlands cricketer
- Jonty Jenner, Jersey cricketer
- William Edwards, Kent cricketer
- Neil Milward Forster, hockey player
- George Garton, England and Sussex cricketer
- William Heasman, Sussex cricketer
- Matt Machan, Sussex cricketer
- Charlie Matthews, Harlequins rugby player
- John Neal, Sussex cricketer
- Arthur Sharood, Sussex cricketer
- Martin Speight, Sussex, Durham and Northumberland cricketer
- Jamie Thompson, Oxford MCCU cricketer
- Guy Waller, Oxford University cricketer
- James Wilkes-Green, Guernsey cricketer

James Allan Rugby player for Sussex county, London Scotland and Anglo Scotland.

=== Religion ===
- Walter Robert Adams, Archbishop of British Columbia and Yukon
- George Daniell, Archdeacon of Southwark
- Arthur Greaves, Bishop of Grimsby and Grantham
- James Sunter, priest

=== Other ===
- William Warwick Buckland, jurist
- Cecil William Davidge, academic and author
- Clive Deverall, businessman
- Dominic Ferris, pianist and conductor
- Leslie Grinsell, archaeologist
- Cecil Humphery-Smith, genealogist and heraldist
- Sir William Kelsey Fry, pioneering dental surgeon
- Andrew Maclear, photographer, screenwriter and documentalist
- Edward Arthur Maund, explorer
- William Alfred Pickwoad, businessman
- Jack Sangster, industrialist
- Bernard Sheldon, MI5 officer
- Sir Basil Smallpeice, businessman
- Francis Williams, headmaster of St Peter's College, Adelaide
