= Arthur Sherwood =

Arthur Sherwood may refer to:

- Sir Percy Sherwood (police officer) (Arthur Percy Sherwood, 1854–1940), Commissioner of Police of the Dominion Police in Canada
- Arthur Sherwood (rugby league) (c. 1894–1952), English rugby league footballer
- Art Sherwood, American professor of entrepreneurship

== See also ==
- Arthur Sharood (1856–1895), English cricketer
