= Nourse =

Nourse is a surname. Notable people with the surname include:

- Alan E. Nourse, (1928–1992), American science fiction author and physician
- Alice Nourse (1882–1967), American novelist
- Amos Nourse (1794–1877), American medical doctor and Senator
- Chet Nourse (1887–1958), American baseball relief pitcher
- Christopher Nourse (born 1946), British arts administrator
- Dave Nourse (1878–1948), South African cricketer
- Dick Nourse, American news anchor
- Dudley Nourse (1910–1981), South African cricketer and batsman
- Edith Nourse Rogers (1881–1960), American social welfare volunteer and politician
- Edward Everett Nourse (1863–1929), American Congregational theologian
- Edwin Griswold Nourse (1883–1974), American economist
- Elizabeth Nourse (1859–1938), American portrait and landscape painter
- Henry Nourse (1780–1838), London wine merchant, lobbied Parliament for settlement of Englishmen in South Africa, 1820 Settlers
- Henry Nourse (1857–1942), South African Businessman, gold mines, Olympic athlete, President S. A. Olympic Committee
- John Nourse, bookseller died 1780
- Joseph Nourse (1754–1841), first United States Register of the Treasury
- Joseph Nourse R.N., C.B., Commodore (1780 – 1824), Naval officer, Napoleonic Wars, War of 1812
- Joseph Nourse R.N., Lt. (1807–1903), Naval officer, Port Natal, Farmer
- Lauren Nourse (born 1982), Australian netball player
- Sir Martin Nourse (born 1932), British judge
- Mary Nourse (1880–1971), American educator
- Rebecca Nourse (1621–1692), executed for witchcraft in the Salem witch trials
- Robert Nourse, entrepreneur
- Victoria F. Nourse, American professor of law

== See also ==
- Nourse Line, shipping company founded by James Nourse
