= Thomas Fielden =

Thomas Fielden may refer to:

- Thomas Fielden (musician) (1883–1974), British pianist and music teacher
- Thomas Fielden (politician) (1854–1897), British Conservative Party politician
