= William Heasman =

English cricketer (1862–1934)

Personal information
- Full name: William Gratwicke Heasman
- Born: 9 December 1862; Angmering, Sussex, England
- Died: 24 January 1934 (aged 71); Eastbourne, Sussex, England
- Batting: Right-handed
- Bowling: Right-arm fast
- Relatives: Michael Earls-Davis (grandson)

Domestic team information
- Years: Team
- 1896: Berkshire
- 1885–1895: Sussex

Career statistics
Competition	First-class
Matches	15
Runs scored	566
Batting average	21.76
100s/50s	–/2
Top score	66
Balls bowled	115
Wickets	–
Bowling average	–
5 wickets in innings	–
10 wickets in match	–
Best bowling	–
Catches/stumpings	7/–
- Source: Cricinfo, 16 July 2013

William Gratwicke Heasman (9 December 1862 – 24 January 1934) was an English cricketer active in the 1880s and 1890s, making fifteen appearances in first-class cricket. Born at Angmering, Sussex, Heasman was a right-handed batsman and right-arm fast bowler, who played first-class cricket for Sussex, and minor counties cricket for Berkshire.

== Career ==
Educated at Hurstpierpoint College, Heasman made his first-class debut for Sussex against the Marylebone Cricket Club at Lord's in 1885. He didn't play first-class cricket for the county again until 1892, when he appeared in that seasons County Championship against Surrey at the County Ground, Hove in a season in which he made a further seven appearances in the County Championship. He played two first-class matches in 1893, against Oxford University and the touring Australians, before making three appearances in the 1894 County Championship, and a final first-class appearance in 1895 against the Marylebone Cricket Club. In his fifteen first-class appearances for Sussex, Heasman scored 566 runs at an average of 21.76, with two half centuries and a high score of 66, made against Oxford University in 1893. He went onto make two appearances for Berkshire in the 1896 Minor Counties Championship against Hertfordshire and Buckinghamshire. He was said to have been a keen fielder and good at point.

Outside of cricket he worked as a doctor, and for a while lived in the United States, where he played cricket for the Philadelphian cricket team in the Halifax Cup. K. S. Duleepsinhji later lived with Heasman in Eastbourne while qualifying to play for Sussex. He died at Eastbourne, Sussex on 24 January 1934. His grandson Michael Earls-Davis also played first-class cricket.
