= Desmond Ruchwaldy =

British flying ace of WWII

- Born: 14 November 1920; Singapore, British Malaya
- Died: 21 May 1946 (aged 25); Poulton, England
- Military career
- Allegiance: United Kingdom
- Branch: Royal Air Force
- Rank: Flight Lieutenant
- Units: No. 603 Squadron (1941–1942); No. 129 Squadron (1943–1944)
- Commands: Glasgow University Air Squadron
- Conflicts: Second World War: Circus offensive; Operation Diver
- Awards: Distinguished Flying Cross; Distinguished Flying Medal

Desmond Ruchwaldy DFC, DFM (14 November 1920 – 21 May 1946) was a British flying ace with the Royal Air Force (RAF) during the Second World War. He is credited with the destruction of at least seven German aircraft as well as several V-1 flying bombs.

Born in Singapore, Ruchwaldy was a bank worker when he joined the RAF in 1940. Once his flying training was completed, he was posted to No. 603 Squadron and flew Supermarine Spitfire fighters during the RAF's Circus offensive of 1941. He claimed his first aerial victories during this time and the following year was awarded the Distinguished Flying Medal. He spent much of 1942 off operations due to injuries sustained in an aircraft accident but returned to operations with No. 129 Squadron in mid-1943. Now a commissioned officer, he claimed further aerial victories. For several weeks from June 1944, the squadron was engaged in Operation Diver, the RAF's campaign against German-launched V-1 flying bombs targeting southeast England. Ruchwaldy destroyed ten V-1s during this period. He ended the war as commander of the Glasgow University Air Squadron. Remaining in the RAF in the postwar period, he was killed in an aircraft accident on 21 May 1946.

== Early life ==
Desmond Ruchwaldy was born on 14 November 1920 to British expatriates in Singapore, at the time part of British Malaya. His family later returned to England and Ruchwaldy went to St Dunstan's Preparatory School in Worthing, and subsequently Hurstpierpoint College in Sussex. In late 1937, following the completion of his schooling, he commenced work at Westminster Bank, based at the branch at Haywards Heath. He later worked at the bank's offices at Broadwater.

== Second World War ==
In July 1940 Ruchwaldy joined the Royal Air Force (RAF) and trained as a pilot. In June 1941, after a period of time at No. 53 Operational Training Unit, he was posted to No. 603 Squadron as a sergeant pilot. His new unit operated the Supermarine Spitfire fighter and was based at Hornchurch, as part of the fighter wing stationed there. It was engaged in the RAF's Circus offensive, regularly flying sorties to France escorting bombers or carrying out offensive sweeps.

=== Circus offensive ===
Ruchwaldy claimed his first aerial victory on 16 August, shooting down a Messerschmitt Bf 109 fighter to the north of Boulogne, during a sortie to support bombers attacking the Luftwaffe airfield at Longuenesse. Three days later, on 19 August, he destroyed a Bf 109 to the north of Dunkirk, one of a number of pilots of the squadron to have successful engagements with the Luftwaffe. Ruchwaldy damaged a Bf 109 on 21 August, and repeated this success on 26 August, also claiming a Bf 109 as probably destroyed near Gravelines. He probably destroyed another Bf 109 near Le Touquet on 18 September, and damaged a Dornier Do 17 medium bomber on 3 November. By this time, the squadron's operations were beginning to taper off.

In January 1942, Ruchwaldy was involved in an aircraft accident in which his back was broken. During his convalescence, he was commissioned as a pilot officer and recognised for his successes with an award of the Distinguished Flying Medal. The announcement was made on 7 April; the citation, published in The London Gazette, read:

Since June, 1941, this airman has participated in a large number of operational sorties in which he has destroyed 2 and probably destroyed a further 2 enemy aircraft. He is a good pilot and he has at all times shown the greatest determination.

— London Gazette, No. 35514, 7 April 1942

=== Service with No. 129 Squadron ===
Once he recovered from his injuries, Ruchwaldy was posted to No. 129 Squadron in mid-1943; by this time he held the rank of flying officer, having been promoted earlier in the year. No. 129 Squadron was based at Hornchurch and operated Spitfires; like Ruchwaldy's previous unit, it performed bomber escort duties. Ruchwaldy damaged a Bf 109 near Blagny on 16 July and destroyed a Focke Wulf 190 fighter to the south of Lille on 31 August. He engaged a Bf 109 on 15 September, probably destroying it, and shot down a Fw 190 near Amiens on 24 September. Three days later, on another sortie to France, he destroyed one Fw 190 and damaged a second. Ruchwaldy's final victories of the year were on 29 November, when he destroyed a Bf 109 and a Fw 190, and also damaged a second Fw 190. No. 129 Squadron was rested at the end of the year, being sent to Peterhead in Scotland. In March 1944, it began converting to the North American Mustang fighter. The same month, Ruchwaldy was awarded the Distinguished Flying Cross. The published citation read:

This officer has completed a large number of sorties and has invariably displayed skill, courage and resource of a high order. He has destroyed 7 enemy aircraft.

— London Gazette, No. 36443, 28 March 1944

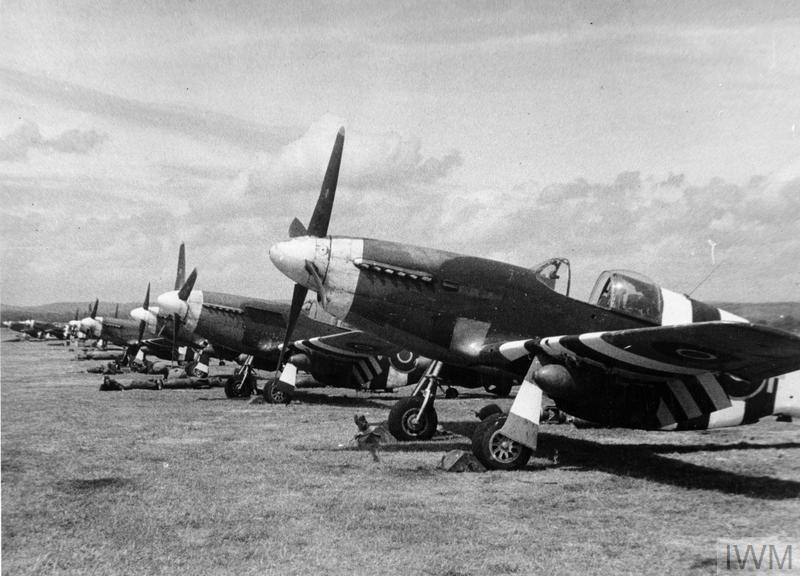
North American Mustangs of No. 129 Squadron, at Coolham, Sussex

In April, No. 129 Squadron moved to Coolham from where it returned to operations. However, in June, once the Germans began launching V-1 flying bombs at southeast England it was tasked with intercepting these as part of Operation Diver. Over the period from June to August, Ruchwaldy destroyed ten V-1s. During this time, he was promoted to flight lieutenant. He was soon rested from operations and sent to the United States on a war bond drive. The final months of the war in Europe was spent as commander of the Glasgow University Air Squadron.

== Postwar period ==
Ruchwaldy remained in the RAF after the war, and was appointed as an instructor at the Central Flying School at South Cerney. He was instructing a pilot in a two-seater de Havilland Tiger Moth trainer on 21 May 1946 when, while performing acrobatics over Poulton, it crashed. Both Ruchwaldy and his student were killed.

Ruchwaldy, who was survived by his wife and son, is buried at Haycombe Cemetery in Bath. He is credited with the destruction of seven German aircraft and is believed to have probably shot down three more aircraft. As well as damaging six other aircraft, he destroyed ten V-1 flying bombs. The Spitfire that he piloted on 24 September 1944 when claiming one of his aerial victories was still in flying condition in 2022.
