= Connop Guthrie =

British businessman and public servant (1882 – 1945)

Sir Connop Thirlwall Robert Guthrie
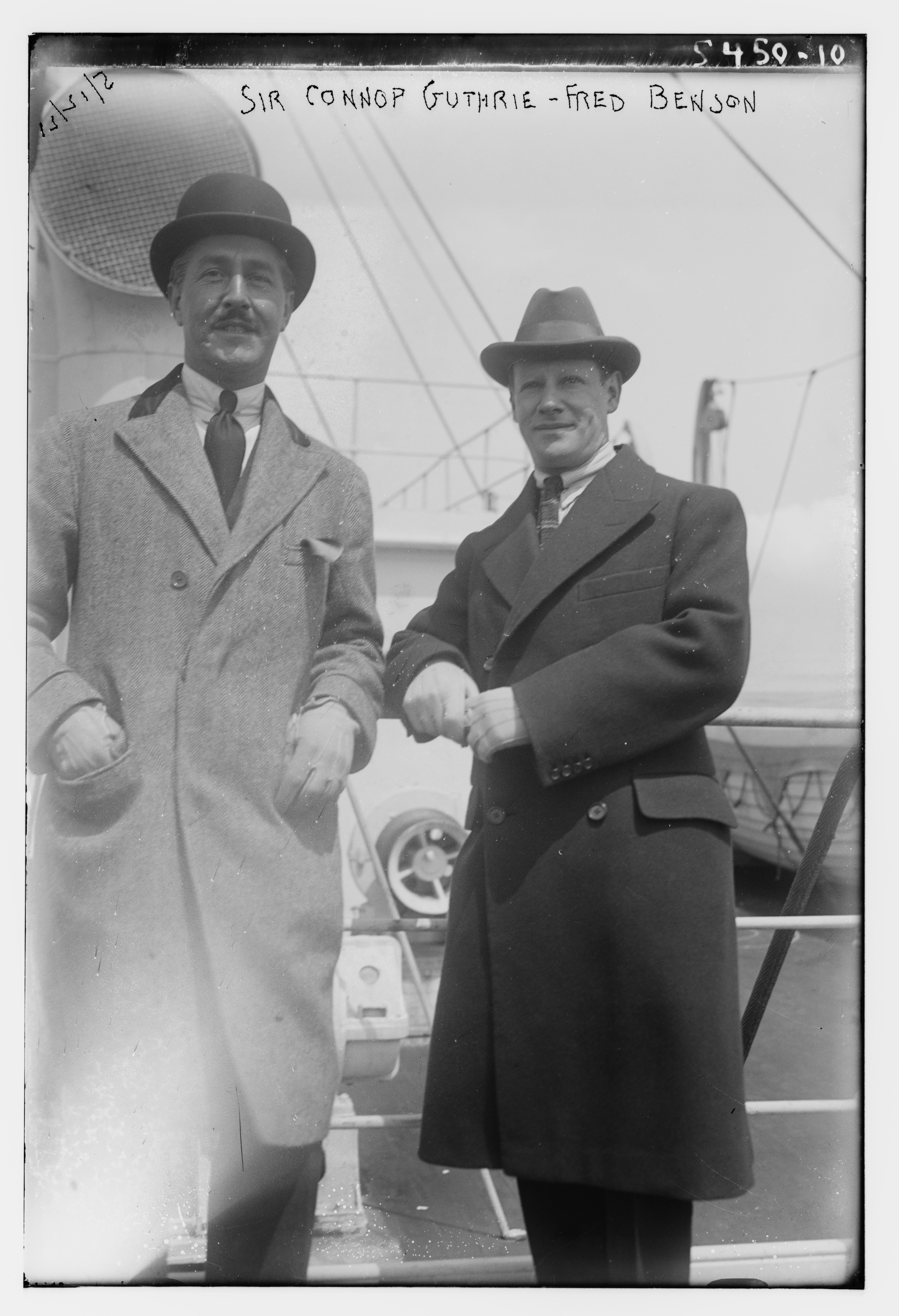
- Sir Connop Guthrie (on left) c. 1921
- Born: 6 July 1882
- Died: 28 September 1945 (aged 63)

Sir Connop Thirlwall Robert Guthrie, 1st Baronet, KBE (6 July 1882 – 28 September 1945) was a British businessman and public servant.

Guthrie served as an officer during the early stages of World War I but following injury, managed the American operations of the Ministry of Shipping. He took up business roles after the war, directing City General Trust before purchasing North Central Wagon Company in a joint venture with Prudential Assurance in 1928. He served as North Central Wagon Company's chairman from 1928 to 1939.

He was appointed Knight Commander of the Order of the British Empire (KBE) in the 1918 New Year Honours for his war service with the Ministry of Shipping, and was created a baronet in the 1936 New Year Honours.

Guthrie died on 28 September 1945. He was succeeded to the baronetcy by his son, Giles Connop McEachern Guthrie.

== See also ==
- Guthrie baronets
