= William Alfred Pickwoad =

British businessman (1886–1975)

William Alfred Pickwoad OBE FRSA
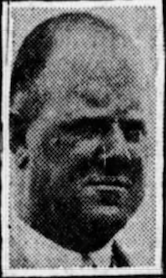
- Born: 24 May 1886; Belize
- Died: 1975 (aged 88–89)

William Alfred Pickwoad OBE FRSA (1886–1975) was a British businessman who was a prominent figure in South America's railway industry and also held directorships in the major business concerns of Bolivia during the 1930s and 1940s. He was variously general manager of the Antofagasta & Bolivia Railway, general manager of the Central Argentine Railway, general manager of the General Mitre Railway, special adviser to the Argentine Ministry of Transport, President of the Bolivian Railway, a founding director of the Central Bank of Bolivia, President of Banco Mercantil, still one of the largest banks in Bolivia, and President of the National Cement Company of Bolivia.

Pickwoad was invested as an Officer of the Order of the British Empire in 1937, a Grand Officer of the Order of the Condor of the Andes in Bolivia, a Commander of the Mérito Militar in Bolivia and as an Officer of the Cruzeiro do Sol in Brazil.

== Early life ==
William Alfred Pickwoad was born in Belize as a British subject on 24 May 1886, the son of Robert Williams Pickwoad and Helen Marian Pickwoad. He was educated at Bedford Modern School and St John's School, Hurstpierpoint. His brother, Howell Pickwoad, was the father of the actor William Mervyn Pickwoad.

== Career ==
Pickwoad started his career in 1904 with the Great Western Railway of Brazil. At the outbreak of World War I he volunteered for active service and attained the rank of captain in the Royal Engineers.

After the war Pickwoad became general manager of the Antofagasta and Bolivia Railway and President of the Bolivian Railway. In 1944 he was appointed general manager of the Central Argentine Railway, a position he held until 1948 when he was made special adviser to the Argentine Ministry of Transport. In 1949 he was made President of a significant import and export business in São Paulo, Brazil.

In addition to his work on South American railways, Pickwoad was a founding director of the Central Bank of Bolivia, President of Banco Mercantil, still one of the largest banks in Bolivia, and President of the National Cement Company of Bolivia.

Pickwoad was invested as an Officer of the Order of the British Empire in 1937, a Grand Officer of the Order of the Condor of the Andes in Bolivia, a Commander of the Mérito Militar of Bolivia and an Officer of the Cruzeiro do Sol in Brazil.

== Personal life ==
On 17 August 1929, Pickwoad married Mary Frances Watkins of Alhambra, California, USA. They had one daughter, Pamela Elizabeth Pickwoad, who married (secondly) Lieutenant-Colonel James Dighton Butler with whom she had two children.

A prominent freemason, Pickwoad was Grand Commander of the Supreme Council of Bolivia and Worshipful Master of the Anglo Bolivian Lodge No 7. He was a founder of the Rotary Club of La Paz in Bolivia and one of its early presidents.
