= Bernard Sheldon =

Bernard Sheldon, CB (14 July 1924 – 19 February 2008) was an officer of MI5 and a lawyer.

== Biography ==
Born on 14 July 1924, he received a scholarship to Hurstpierpoint College in 1938, was captain of the school, joined the Royal Naval Reserve in 1943, being commissioned the following year. He served on HMS Formidable, seeing action against the Tirpitz and at the Battle of Okinawa.

He was demobilised in 1946 and studied for the Bar, became a member of the Middle Temple in 1947, then was called to the bar in 1949.

While working for the Colonial Legal Service in Malaya he was recruited by MI5. In 1963 he became security liaison officer in Hong Kong. He returned to London in 1966, becoming understudy to MI5's legal adviser until he assumed the role in 1968. He became legal adviser to the Secret Intelligence Service and Government Communications Headquarters.

He was involved in the prosecutions of Geoffrey Prime, Michael Bettaney and Hugh Hambleton.

Controversial allegations about security service activity in Northern Ireland involved him in damage limitation on behalf of the security services.

Sheldon was appointed a Companion of the Order of the Bath (CB) in the 1981 Birthday Honours.

He retired in 1987, became involved in Citizens Advice Bureau as well as police, fire service and prison boards.

He died on 19 February 2008.
