= Guthrie baronets =

Baronetcy in the Baronetage of the United Kingdom

There have been three baronetcies created for persons with the surname of Guthrie, one in the Baronetage of Nova Scotia and one in the Baronetage of the United Kingdom.

The Guthrie Baronetcy, of Kingsward in the County of Banff, was created in the Baronetage of Nova Scotia in 1638 for Harry Guthrie. Nothing further is known of this title.

The Guthrie Baronetcy, of Brent Eleigh Hall in the County of Suffolk, is a title in the Baronetage of the United Kingdom. It was created on 6 February 1936 for the financier and public servant Connop Guthrie. The second Baronet was managing director of Brown, Shipley & Co. and chairman and chief executive of BOAC.

The Guthrie baronets of Craigiebank was created in 1999 and in 2001 was granted supporters for life

== Guthrie baronets, of Kingsward (1638) ==
- Sir Harry Guthrie, 1st Baronet

== Guthrie baronets, of Brent Eleigh Hall (1936) ==
- Sir Connop Thirlwall Robert Guthrie, KBE, 1st Baronet (1882–1945)
- Sir Giles Connop McEacharn Guthrie, OBE, DSC, 2nd Baronet (1916–1979)
- Sir Malcolm Connop Guthrie, 3rd Baronet (born 1942)

The heir apparent to the baronetcy is Giles Malcolm Welcome Guthrie (born 1972), only son of the 3rd Baronet.

== Guthrie baronets of Craigiebank (1999) ==
- Charles Guthrie, Baron Guthrie of Craigiebank
