= Basil Smallpeice =

Accountant and businessman

Sir Basil Smallpeice KCVO
- Born: 18 September 1906; Rio de Janeiro, Brazil
- Died: 12 July 1992 (aged 85); Epsom, Surrey, England
- Education: University of London
- Occupation: Company director
- Board member of: British Overseas Airways Corporation (1953–1963); Cunard (1964–1971); Trafalgar House (1971–1972); Lonrho (1972–1973)
- Spouses: Kathleen Singleton (m. 1931; died 1973) Rita Burns (m. 1973)

Sir Basil Smallpeice, KCVO (18 September 1906 – 12 July 1992) was an English accountant and businessman, who served as a director of several companies, including the state-owned airline British Overseas Airways Corporation (BOAC), the shipping company Cunard and the mining-based conglomerate Lonrho.

Smallpeice, as financial comptroller and later, managing director, was one of the board of BOAC who was instrumental in purchasing and introducing jet powered aircraft into passenger service. During his tenure at BOAC the company introduced such aircraft as the de Havilland Comet, the Boeing 707 and the Vickers VC10. His time at BOAC included the introduction of the Comet 1, the subsequent Comet disasters where metal fatigue caused the in-flight destruction of three aircraft, with a loss of 99 passengers and crew, the re-introduction of the Comet 4 and the inauguration of the first jet-powered transatlantic services in October 1958. He would later be instrumental in the purchase of the Boeing 707, which introduced the first by-pass turbofan engine, the Rolls-Royce Conway into passenger service. He left BOAC along with his chairman Matthew Slattery, over disagreements with the Government concerning financial support in return for purchasing the Vickers VC10.

He moved to Cunard as a director and then chairman, where he was responsible for radically altering the passenger and freight operations of the business; on the passenger side of the business, he cut massive losses by selling the Queen Mary and Queen Elizabeth liners, then oversaw the radical re-design of the replacement liner the Queen Elizabeth 2, which was under construction when he took up his position with Cunard. The changes he oversaw allowed the Queen Elizabeth 2 to become a profitable luxury liner for the company. His work on the freight size of the business included the containerisation of the business together with the amalgamation of smaller lines and the formation of joint ventures which would be needed to operate larger container ships. He was chairman of Cunard when the Atlantic Conveyor was ordered and launched as part of Cunard's contribution to the Atlantic Container Line joint-venture.

His final major business appointment was as a non-executive director of Lonhro, where soon after he took office, he uncovered illicit payments to Duncan Sandys and further impropriety undertaken by chief executive Tiny Rowland, who had committed company funds to projects without the agreement of the board and granted share options to other sympathetic board members. Smallpeice and seven fellow directors attempted to remove Rowland from office on the grounds of his behaviour, but he managed to out-manoeuvre them by obtaining a temporary injunction preventing his removal. The Prime Minister Edward Heath considered Rowland's behaviour to be "the unacceptable face of capitalism" and despite support for Smallpeice and his fellow directors in the press and in the city, where they were dubbed "the straight eight", they all resigned at a subsequent extraordinary general meeting later in 1973.

Smallpeice also held a post as an administrative advisor to the household of Queen Elizabeth II. He became well known and trusted by the Queen as a result of his work with BOAC organising flights and aircraft for the royal family, including the flight which took Princess Elizabeth to Kenya at the end of January 1952 and returned her as Queen several days later.

== Early life ==
Smallpeice was born in Rio de Janeiro, Brazil, on 18 September 1906. His father was Herbert Charles Smallpeice and his mother was Georgina Ruth Smallpeice (née Rust). Herbert Smallpeice was a senior clerk with the London and River Plate Bank, a British bank which conducted business in South America. Basil contracted malaria whilst in South America and was returned to Britain.

He was privately schooled whilst in Britain, initially at Hurstpierpoint College, then at Shrewsbury School, before joining Bullimore and Co., an accountancy firm based in London and Norwich, as an articled clerk. Smallpeice qualified as an accountant in 1930, and undertook the University of London Bachelor of Commerce degree whilst training.

== Business career ==
Smallpeice was initially employed by The Hoover Company from 1931 to 1937 as an accountant and assistant secretary, before moving to Royal Doulton as their chief accountant and secretary, where he stayed until 1948. He served as acting managing director during World War II when Royal Doulton's managing director, retired Royal Navy officer Basil Green, returned to active service. Royal Doulton was covered by an essential work order and Smallpeice's role considered a reserved occupation, restricting him from active military service, though he was permitted to serve with the Home Guard. Basil Green's short return during the Phoney War of 1939 allowed Smallpeice to take up a position with HM Treasury, working with the Organisation and Methods Division, but Green was again recalled to active service when Germany invaded the Low Countries, with Smallpeice returning to Doulton's.

He and like-minded accountants in the same position would spend much of their spare time during the war writing papers on accountancy, taxation and management, with one paper, entitled "The Future of Auditing" provoking a strong response amongst Institute of Chartered Accountants in England and Wales (ICAEW) members when it was published in their journal, The Accountant in 1941. This would lead to the formation of the Taxation and Financial Relations Committee at the ICAEW in 1942, and Smallpeice would be one of the first members to join that committee. He would join the board of the Office Management Association prior to that.

Smallpeice, with support from E. H. Carr who was then assistant editor of The Times, promoted the idea of employers deducting income tax from wages and passing it to Government directly rather than waiting for employees to do so at the end of the financial year. He introduced this idea to Paul Chambers, then on the board of the Inland Revenue. The idea, which became the PAYE system, would be tested in 1940–1941 and introduced permanently in 1944. The system vastly simplified and increased tax collection during the latter stages of World War II, when Britain was in desperate need of funds.

Smallpeice would, whilst working at Doulton's, involve himself further in the ICAEW, promoting rule changes which would allow chartered accountants working in industry to sit on the ICAEW council, and being eligible to be Fellows of the institute. This would lead to him serving on the ICAEW council from 1948 to 1957.

=== British Transport Commission ===
Smallpeice left Doulton's in 1948 when it became clear he wouldn't be offered a board position with the company, and moved to join fellow accountant Reginald Wilson at the state owned British Transport Commission (BTC). Wilson, as comptroller, offered Smallpeice the role of Director of Costs and Statistics, but within two years, Smallpeice grew to realise that the business, with 600,000 staff, was effectively unmanageable without support from government and he began to assess his options elsewhere.

He spoke to Harold Howitt when he was thinking of leaving the BTC and was informed that Miles Thomas needed an experienced accountant to institute strict financial controls at BOAC. Smallpeice would turn down the role initially, fearing the state owned BOAC would be similar to the BTC in terms of culture and manageability. Howitt pressed Smallpeice to reconsider and following a meeting a few days with Miles Thomas and he accepted the position at BOAC, which was tailored to the role he and Miles Thomas desired he have within the company.

=== BOAC ===
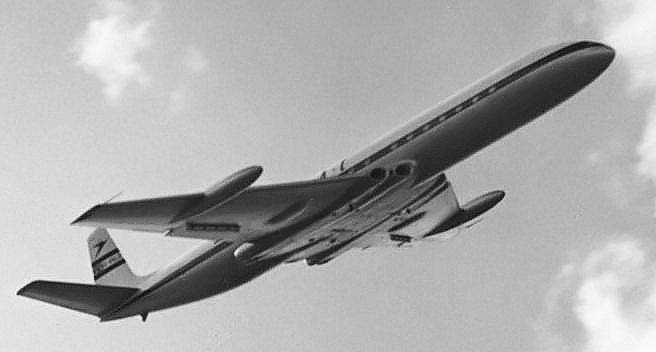
Smallpeice was involved in the decision to purchase the jet powered de Havilland Comet

Smallpeice formally joined BOAC on 1 January 1950, taking the title and role of financial comptroller. The title reflected his intention to provide useful financial information to managers within the company, allowing them to take informed decisions, rather than dictating what the company would be doing from head office. The financial comptroller position became a board position in 1953, and accordingly Smallpeice was appointed to the board. He would then be promoted to the additional position of deputy chief executive in June 1954.

He was instrumental in the decision to purchase the de Havilland Comet, believing the efficiencies and benefits of jet powered military aircraft would be useful if replicated in a civilian environment, and recognising the outdated aircraft the airline would otherwise be left with. The early operation of the de Havilland Comet was characterised by the series of fatal crashes which would result in the resignation of Miles Thomas as chairman in 1955. The root cause was eventually attributed to metal fatigue and no blame was attached to either Smallpeice or indeed to Thomas. Smallpeice would initially retain his position as financial comptroller under the incoming chairman, Gerard d'Erlanger, this would be a temporary arrangement and in 1956 Smallpeice was promoted to the role of chief executive, albeit with the title managing director.

d'Erlanger and Smallpeice, who developed a particularly strong working relationship, were supporters of the British aviation industry, pursuing British built aircraft for BOAC. Smallpeice in particular had been a strong supporter of de Havilland throughout the period of the Comet crashes and re-introduction to service, but concerns about the reintroduction of the Comet, delays with the Bristol Britannia and a lack of any other suitable British aircraft nearing production would force BOAC into purchasing the Boeing 707 aircraft. Smallpeice was instrumental in their purchase, discreetly arranging for BOAC staff to visit America and examine the Boeing 367-80 prototype before persuading the government to authorise the purchase, as was necessary at the time.

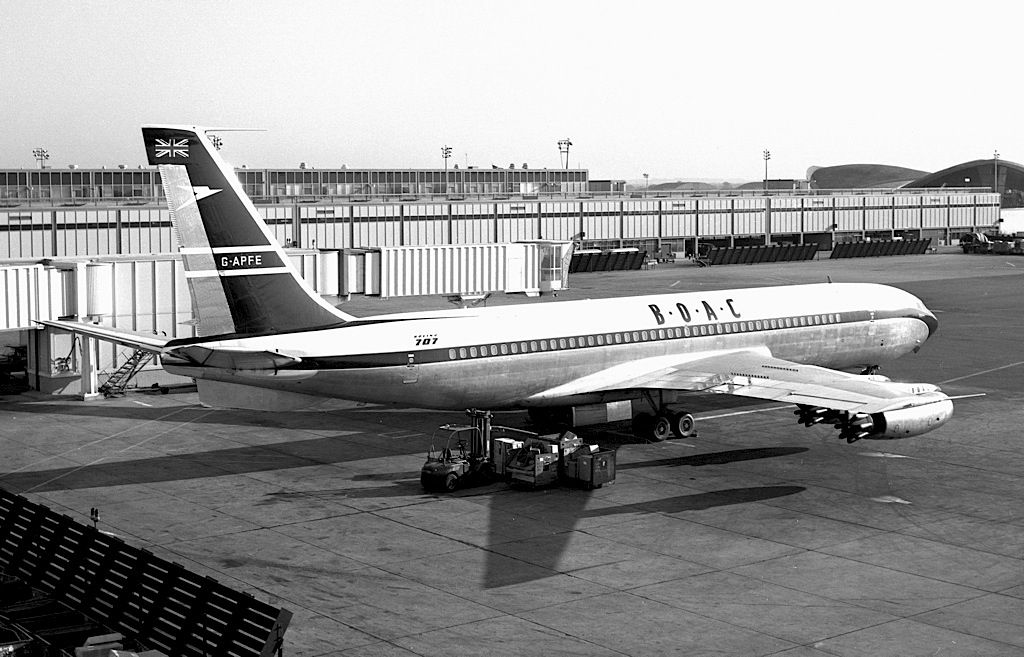
Boeing's jet powered 707, an aircraft Smallpeice was also instrumental in BOAC purchasing. This aircraft was involved in the crash of BOAC Flight 911

The purchase of the Boeing 707 aircraft would be followed by several orders for Vickers competing design, the VC10, with BOAC having ordered 35 VC10 aircraft by 1959 and an additional ten (bringing the total on order to 45) by 1961. Payments for these aircraft together with a downturn in transatlantic traffic, increased competition on the transatlantic route by additional carriers equipped with jet aircraft, and a whole host of additional costs associated with the Vickers VC10 and Bristol Britannia purchase would result in BOAC becoming extremely unprofitable from late 1961 onwards.

It was during this period that Smallpeice began to work with Sir Edward Fielden, Captain of the Queen's Flight on arrangements to fly Queen Elizabeth II, Prince Philip, Duke of Edinburgh and other members of the royal family overseas on BOAC aircraft. Smallpeice, who generally took personal responsibility for the organisation of these flights, was recognised for this work in 1961 when he was appointed a Knight Commander of the Royal Victorian Order.

d'Erlanger retired as chairman in 1960, and was succeeded by Matthew Slattery. Smallpeice remained as managing director, and together Slattery and Smallpeice set about cutting costs at the airline as the financial performance continued to deteriorate. BOAC would incur significant losses in 1961 and 1962 amidst decreasing passenger loadings, comparatively high maintenance costs and ongoing payments to Vickers for the VC10 orders. The financial situation was further endangered by competition from independent British operation Cunard Eagle Airways, a joint venture between British Eagle and Cunard. The venture had ordered two Boeing 707 aircraft in March 1961, intending to recapture Cunard's transatlantic market which was traditionally the preserve of their ocean liners, the RMS Queen Mary and RMS Queen Elizabeth. They received permission to operate services between London and New York in June 1961, though this was swiftly withdrawn by the Minister of Aviation when BOAC appealed the decision.

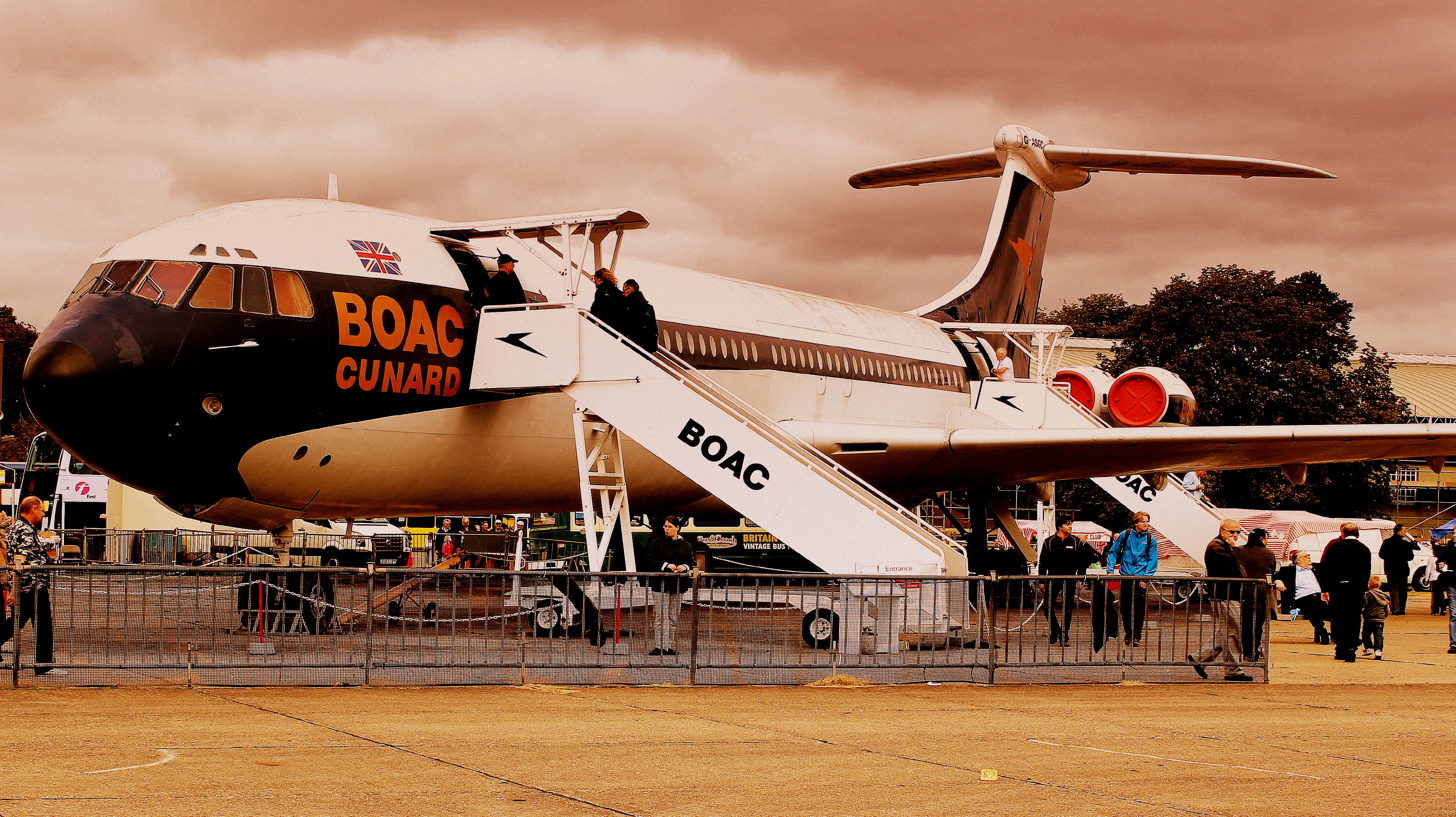
Smallpeice additionally served as managing director of the BOAC-Cunard joint venture

Smallpeice, concerned about the additional competition and unable to obtain additional Boeing 707 aircraft any other way, began talks in April 1962 to merge BOAC's North Atlantic operations with those of Cunard Eagle. Agreement was reached in early June 1962 on ownership percentages, and the newly formed company, BOAC-Cunard, began operations later that month. The new airline would operate all the transatlantic services of BOAC and Cunard Eagle from 1962 to 1966. Smallpeice served as managing director of the joint venture, in addition to his role as managing director of BOAC itself.

The downturn in the aviation sector and ongoing disagreements between Julian Amery, the new Minister of Aviation and BOAC concerning writing off debt incurred buying and troubleshooting new British aircraft resulted in a further deterioration in relations between the airline and government. Amery commissioned an independent report into the financial performance of BOAC, undertaken by John Corbett. The ongoing disagreement about the funding arrangements for BOAC and the need for new Vickers VC10 aircraft would eventually be resolved in late 1963, when Slattery formally retired as chairman, though this was widely seen as a resignation; Slattery commented in 1964 that he had effectively been sacked.

Giles Guthrie, a respected aviator, merchant banker and director of British European Airways who would take over from Slattery as chairman and chief executive, also intended to perform some of the managing director's roles, making Smallpeice's position essentially redundant; Smallpeice was asked to resign by Amery, leaving the company late in 1963 to facilitate Guthrie's new management structure. Smallpeice, like Slattery, considered that had effectively been sacked. The concerns Slattery and Smallpeice expressed about the financial arrangements of the company and Vickers VC10 purchases would be vindicated when Guthrie was able to have the government write off the outstanding debt, inject additional cash into the company, and permit the purchase of a smaller number of Vickers VC10 aircraft. The Corbett report was never made public; neither Slattery, Smallpeice nor Guthrie are believed to have been given access to the full report.

Smallpeice and Slattery were praised by Guthrie in 1964, when the airline reported a profit for the 1963–1964 financial year, commenting that he was unable to take credit for the performance and this his predecessors were largely responsible for the improved financial performance of the airline.

=== Cunard ===
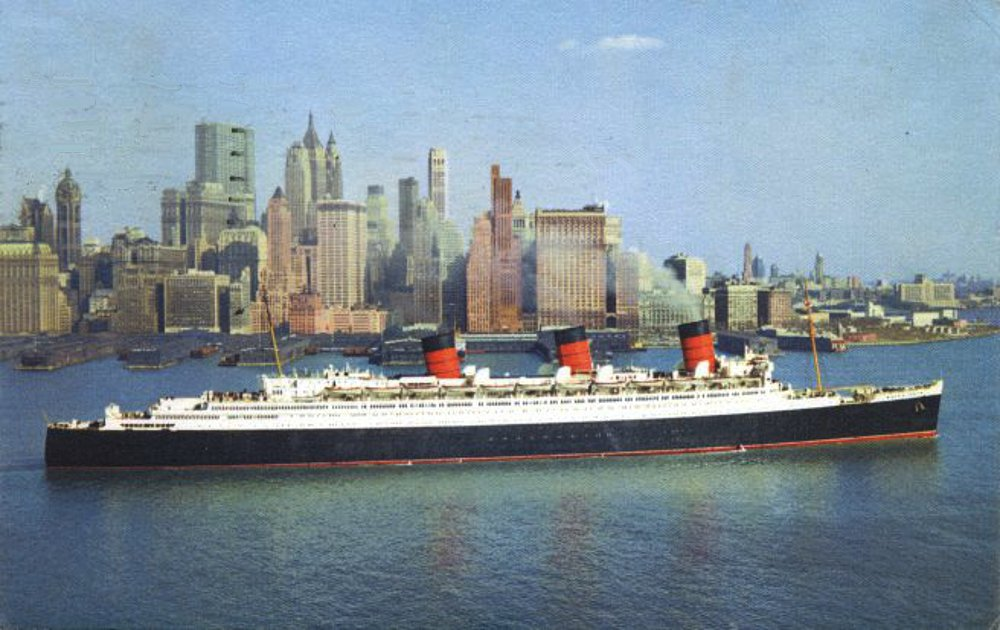
The RMS Queen Mary, which was making a loss in 1965, when Smallpeice took over as chairman. He would sell the vessel in 1967 and the RMS Queen Elizabeth in 1968

Smallpeice, upon leaving BOAC, spoke with his friend Kim Cobbold, the Lord Chamberlain about future career possibilities. He was advised to take a holiday and put his departure from BOAC behind him, whilst Cobbold would investigate what positions may be available for Smallpeice.

Cunard Line, already familiar with Smallpeice as a result of the BOAC-Cunard venture, were quick to approach him. Sir John Brocklebank offered Smallpeice a board position with the shipping line in December 1963, during Smallpeice's last meeting as a BOAC representative on the BOAC-Cunard board. Smallpeice initially refused to commit to the position, instead taking a three-month cruise from Hong Kong to London (with P&O).

Smallpeice arrived back in London during March 1964 and returned to meet with Cobbold, informing him of the offer with Cunard, a position which initially would be the management of Cunard's London operation, with a trip to Cunard's headquarters in Liverpool once a week for management and board meetings. Cobbold also had a job offer for Smallpeice, an accountancy position within the Queen's Household, a position formally to be titled Administrative Adviser. This position could be combined with the work at Cunard quite comfortably, but would preclude taking further directorships in the short term, as a result, Smallpeice was forced to turn down non-executive director positions with Charterhouse Group and Rugby Portland Cement.

Smallpeice joined Cunard and was appointed to the board in April 1964. Bill Donald, the deputy chairman of Cunard, retired in June 1965 and Smallpeice was appointed as his replacement, but this was to be a short term position. John Brocklebank stood down on 8 November 1965 on health grounds, and Smallpeice was promoted to chairman and chief executive by his colleagues on the board.

Cunard was in significant financial difficulties when Smallpeice joined, and posted a loss of $7.2 million in 1965, losing money on the passenger ships and making profits on their shipping line. Smallpeice initially attempted to resolve the financial position of the company by embarking on a merger with another shipping line. Ocean Steamship Company had previously asked that they have first refusal on a merger with Cunard. Ocean Steamship brought P&O into the discussions, and a three-way merger at one point looked feasible, but neither party could see any benefit in a deal involving Cunard, and backed out of proposed deal.

The National Union of Seamen's Strike of 1966 damaged the already fragile finances of Cunard, and left Smallpeice with few options. The company, by now in need of cash, was forced to sell its stake in BOAC-Cunard. Smallpeice then turned to strengthening the board and bringing in experts from outwith the company, inviting Stormont Mancroft, 2nd Baron Mancroft, Priscilla Buchan, John Wall and Maxwell Joseph to join the board.

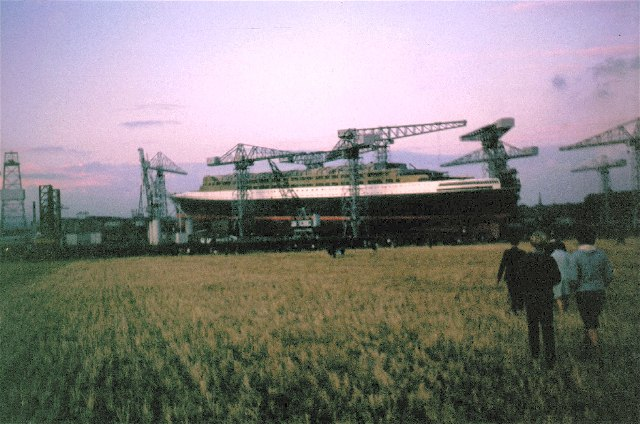
Q4 under construction by John Brown & Company, Clydebank in August 1967. Basil Smallpeice was involved in the fitting out of the ship

Smallpeice, once the new Cunard board had been constituted, turned his attention to the new cruise ship being built for the company. The ship, codenamed Q4, had been proposed and planned under the auspices of his predecessor, John Brocklebank. However, with the ship now approaching completion and requiring fitting out, it would fall to Smallpeice and his board to appoint interior and exterior designers and approve design schemes for the new ship. Smallpeice, having assessed a report by the Economist Intelligence Unit, decided on significant alterations to the interior layout, abolishing the old three class layout and replacing it with a flexible layout which could be split into two classes for North Atlantic crossings and combined into a single class layout for cruising in the Caribbean. This new layout was expected to suit the tastes of American passengers, predicted to be the largest passenger group on the new liner.

The existing cruise ships RMS Queen Mary and RMS Queen Elizabeth were intended to remain in service until their replacement entered service, but a deterioration in the passenger market in 1967 resulted in the sale of the RMS Queen Mary, being sold to raise additional funds for the company at the end of the 1967 summer cruising season. The RMS Queen Elizabeth followed out of service in November 1968.

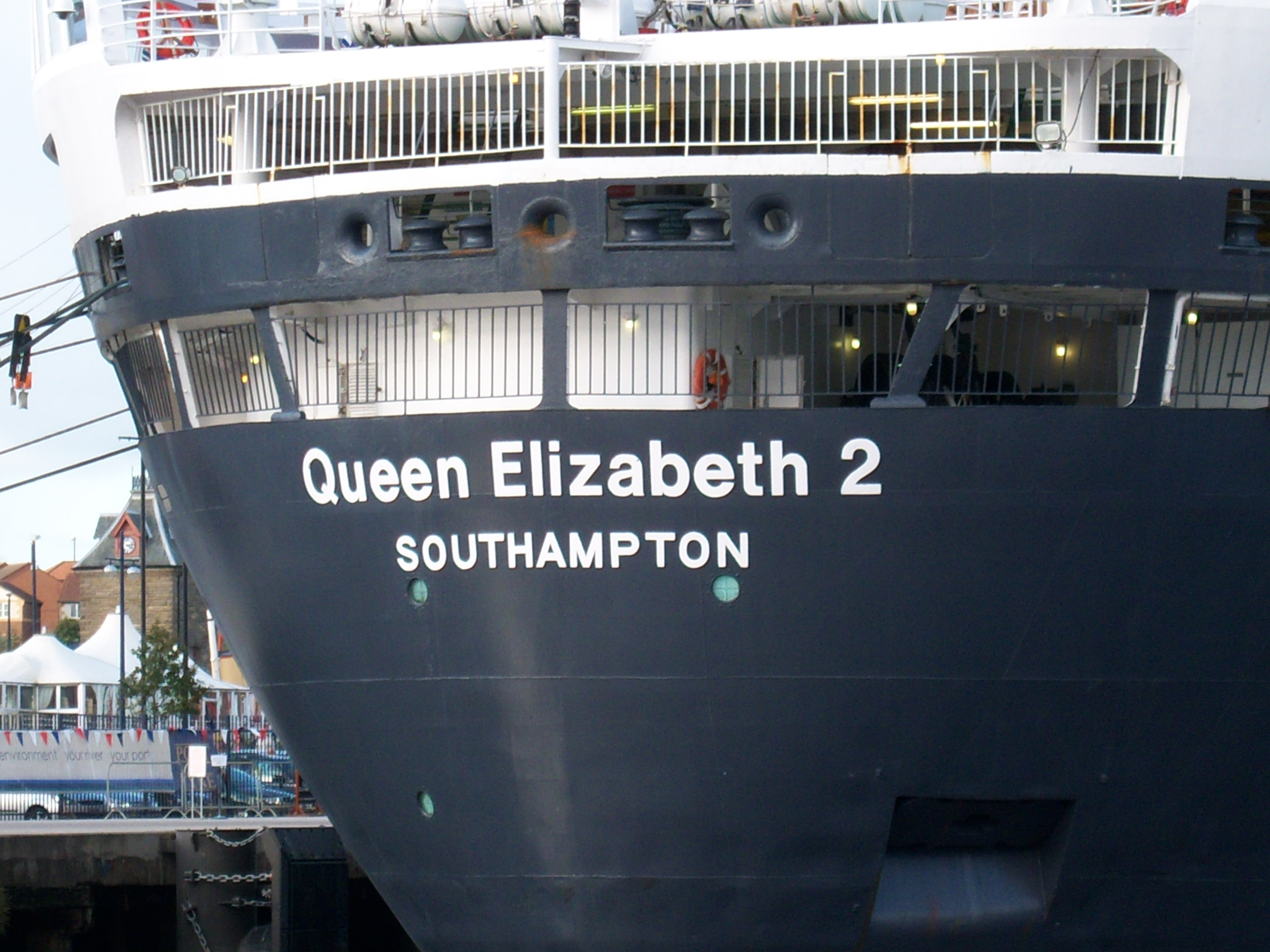
The naming of Q4 required discussion between Smallpeice and Michael Adeane, the Queen's Private Secretary, both before and after the naming

The naming of Q4 presented a headache for Smallpeice, realising that he could not seek permission to call the ship the Queen Elizabeth II, as only Royal Navy battleships had been named after a reigning monarch. Smallpeice discussed the issue with the Queen's Private Secretary Sir Michael Adeane and it was agreed that they would recommend to Her Majesty that the ship be named Queen Elizabeth. This was in keeping with normal Cunard practice of reusing previous ships names and didn't present any issues as the old and the new ships would not be in Cunard service at the same time. Elizabeth II launched the ship on 20 September 1967 but surprised and delighted Smallpeice and the invited guests when she named the ship Queen Elizabeth the Second. Smallpeice believed using the style Queen Elizabeth II wasn't entirely appropriate, it being the designation of the sovereign, and sought permission to use an Arabic 2 in place of Roman numerals.

The shipping line operations of Cunard didn't escape review by Smallpeice. He was already familiar with the containerisation of freight prior to taking up his position with Cunard, but spent time during 1966 to visit the Sea-Land Service container terminal at Port Newark and further familiarised himself with the use of containers in marine traffic. Container ships were considered too large for the traditional British shipping lines, including Cunard and their subsidiaries to operate, so it would be necessary to form partnerships.

Smallpeice initially held discussions in 1965 with the newly formed Overseas Containers group, which was focused on the UK to Australia and Far East routes, about Cunard's Port Line subsidiary and Ronald Vestey's Blue Star Line joining British & Commonwealth Shipping, Furness Withy, P&O and the Ocean Steamship Company in the joint venture. Their approaches were rebuffed, and it was quickly decided that Cunard and Blue Star Line should try to form a rival group, which would be called Associated Container Transportation. The venture was formed in late 1965 and early 1966, with the first board meeting taking place on 12 January 1966. Cunard's Port Line and Vestey's Blue Star Line were joined by Ben Line, Ellerman Lines and Harrison Line in the venture. Alexander Hull from Ellerman Lines was the inaugural chairman, but following his death in April 1967, Smallpeice took over as chairman of Associated Container Transportation.

The Australian shipping interests of Cunard, Blue Star Line and Ellerman Lines were subsequently formed into a separate operating company, Associated Container Transportation (Australia), and following work by Smallpeice, the Australian government allowed the state owned Australian National Line to form a partnership with Associated Container Transportation (Australia). The group would go on to form the Pacific America Container Express which operated services between Australia and the east coast of North America via the Panama Canal. Smallpeice would serve as chairman of the Associated Container Transportation (Australia)/Australian National Line partnership from its creation in 1969 and as chairman of Associated Container Transportation (Australia) from 1971, retiring from both positions in February 1979.

The process was repeated for Cunard's North Atlantic shipping interests. They applied and were accepted into the Atlantic Container Line in December 1966, joining with the founding companies Wallenius Lines, Swedish American Line, Swedish Transatlantic Line and Holland America Line. Cunard joined at the same time as Compagnie Générale Transatlantique (French Line). Cunard inherited planning work and ship designs when they joined with Atlantic Container Line group, and as part of their application to join, Cunard would build two ships for the ACL fleet, the SS Atlantic Causeway and the SS Atlantic Conveyor. The Atlantic Conveyor would, in 1982, become the first British merchant ship to be lost to enemy action since World War II, after being requisitioned for use in the Falklands War.

The agreements to containerise Cunard's freight operations had returned the overall Cunard group to profitability, with the shipping line now profitable and the passenger ships losing money, a reversal of the situation Smallpeice had inherited in 1965. The company returned profits of £2 million in 1968 and £3 million in 1969 and the share price rose accordingly. The downturn in the economy and shipping industry in 1970 resulted in Cunard once again incurring a loss and a drop in the share price, resulting in the company becoming a takeover target.

Smallpeice attempted to defend the company against a takeover, commissioning a report from McKinsey & Company on the future outlook of the company. This course of action would ultimately prove futile and Trafalgar House would launch a successful bid for the company, beginning on 30 June 1971. Smallpeice accepted an increased bid from Trafalgar House at the end of July, and would go on to preside over the last board meeting of Cunard as an independent company on 25 August 1971, 93 years after its incorporation.

=== Lonrho ===
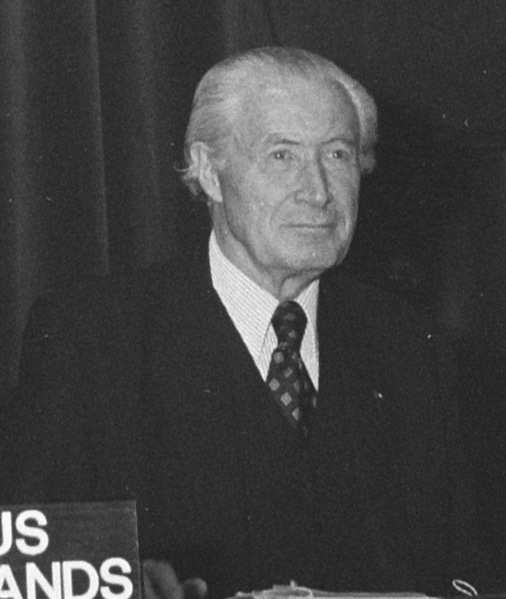
Duncan Sandys, chairman of Lonrho during the period Smallpeice served as non-executive deputy chairman

Smallpeice transferred to the Trafalgar House board, but stayed just five months before leaving in January 1972. Trafalgar House together with Blue Star Line and Ellerman Line asked that Smallpeice remain in his role as chairman of Associated Container Transportation (Australia) and the Australian government asked that he remain in his role as chairman of the Associated Container Transportation (Australia)/Australian Line partnership.

Sir John Thomson, chairman of Barclays Bank approached Smallpeice in March 1972 about him joining the board of Lonrho, which was in need of refinancing. The financial markets expected additional experienced company directors to be appointed to the board, resulting initially in Conservative politician and former cabinet minister Duncan Sandys taking over as chairman of the company. Smallpeice, when at BOAC, had worked with Sandys when he was aviation minister and the two knew each other well. Sandys sought Smallpeice to join him on the board of Lonrho.

Alan Ball the previous chairman became executive deputy chairman, with Smallpeice requesting a non-executive deputy chairman position, which was quickly agreed to. Sandys and Smallpeice were joined by a third new board member, the Conservative politician Edward du Cann and the new board constituted in March 1972. The board quickly become concerned at the behaviour of their chief executive Tiny Rowland who had agreed in principle to finance a sugar refinery in Sudan at a cost of £80 to £100 million, whilst the company was in the midst of refinancing itself. The board was able to reword the agreement and it became a feasibility study, recovering the situation but respite from a further crisis would prove to be short lived. The situation at Lonrho went from bad to worse during early 1973, when Peats, Lonrho's auditors, discovered payments totalling £44,000 made from a subsidiary company based in the Cayman Islands to Duncan Sandys. Sandys, believing that the payment had been authorised by the board returned in full the money he had received.

The situation would deteriorate further, additional legal and financial irregularities were uncovered, leaving Smallpeice and the other directors to consider resignation. Smallpeice was informed, after consulting Nicholas Wilson, a partner with Slaughter and May that he and the other directors could leave themselves liable to legal action for dereliction of duty. Counsel advised Smallpeice and the other directors that they should submit Lonrho to inspection by the Department of Trade and Industry, but in discussions with the Governor of the Bank of England, Sir Leslie O'Brien, this course of action was recommended against.

Smallpeice and seven of his fellow directors felt there was no other course of action left open to them but to ask Rowland to relinquish all executive appointments with Lonrho, but to allow him to remain on the board as a non-executive director. Rowland refused and the eight directors prepared to pass a motion at the first full board meeting, set for 18 April 1973, forcing Rowland to relinquish all of his executive appointments. Rowland, aware of the possibility, had obtained an interlocutory injunction from the High Court of Justice preventing the board from voting on his removal.

Rowland then proceeded to take the eight directors to court, to permanently prevent them from being able to vote on his removal from the board, this case was lost by Rowland, but due to delays in the legal process, the final judgement was passed on 14 May, 17 days prior to the general meeting, and it was felt best to leave the composition of the board to a vote of shareholders. Rowland's 20% holding in Lonrho and further proxy votes would allow him to retain his position on the board and at the general meeting, Smallpeice and the seven fellow directors were voted off the board. The behaviour of Lonrho was described by the Prime Minister Edward Heath as "the unpleasant and unacceptable face of capitalism" in a House of Commons debate on 15 May 1973, and the company was eventually subject to an enquiry by Inspectors from the Department for Trade and Industry, which reported in 1976.

Smallpeice and the seven other directors were dubbed "the straight eight" as a result of their honest and principled stance in contemporary newspaper coverage, but Smallpeice would find further employment impossible whilst the Lonrho investigation was carried out. The resulting investigation showed evidence of illicit payments being made to Duncan Sandys and Angus Ogilvy, bribery of African leaders and of Lonrho avoiding UN sanctions by trading with the white minority regime in Rhodesia, in violation of United Nations Security Council Resolution 216.

=== Other interests ===
Smallpeice served as a director of Martins Bank from 1965 to 1969 alongside Sir John Brocklebank, his predecessor as Cunard chairman, remaining with Martins until 1969 when the bank was incorporated into Barclays Bank. He served on the London local board of Martins Bank prior to his appointment on the main board, serving from to 1964 to 1965. Smallpeice would join the London local board of Barclays Bank after their takeover of Martins Bank, a position he held until 1973.

He was involved throughout his career in professional bodies, in addition to his time on the council of the Institute of Chartered Accountants in England and Wales earlier in his career, from 1958 to 1961, he served on the council of the Institute of Transport. Smallpeice then served on the council of the British Institute of Management from 1959 to 1964 and again from 1965 to 1975, during this period, he was also a member of the Government's Committee for Exports to the United States of America, serving from 1964 to 1966. He was promoted to chairman of the British Institute of Management, serving from 1970 to 1972, and then as vice president from 1972 onwards. His final industrial council appointment was as President of the Institute of Freight Forwarders from 1977 to 1978.

Smallpeice joined John Corbett at accountancy firm Peat, Marwick, Mitchell & Co. in 1975, working as an air and sea transportation consultant. Peat, Marwick, Mitchell & Co. would merge with Klynveld Main Goerdeler to form KPMG in 1987.

His role with BOAC would see him be appointed a liveryman of The Guild of Air Pilots and Air Navigators in 1960 and joining the Air League. He succeeded Clive Hunting as chairman of the Air League in 1971 for a three-year term. He was a companion of the Royal Aeronautical Society from 1960 to 1975, and became a liveryman of The Worshipful Company of Coachmakers and Coach Harness Makers in 1961, as a livery company, they represent aircraft builders.

Smallpeice remained on the boards of Associated Container Transportation (Australia) and the Associated Container Transportation (Australia)/Australian Line partnership until retiring in 1979. His final professional position would be his role as Administrative Adviser to the Queen's Household, from which he retired in 1980.

== Personal life ==
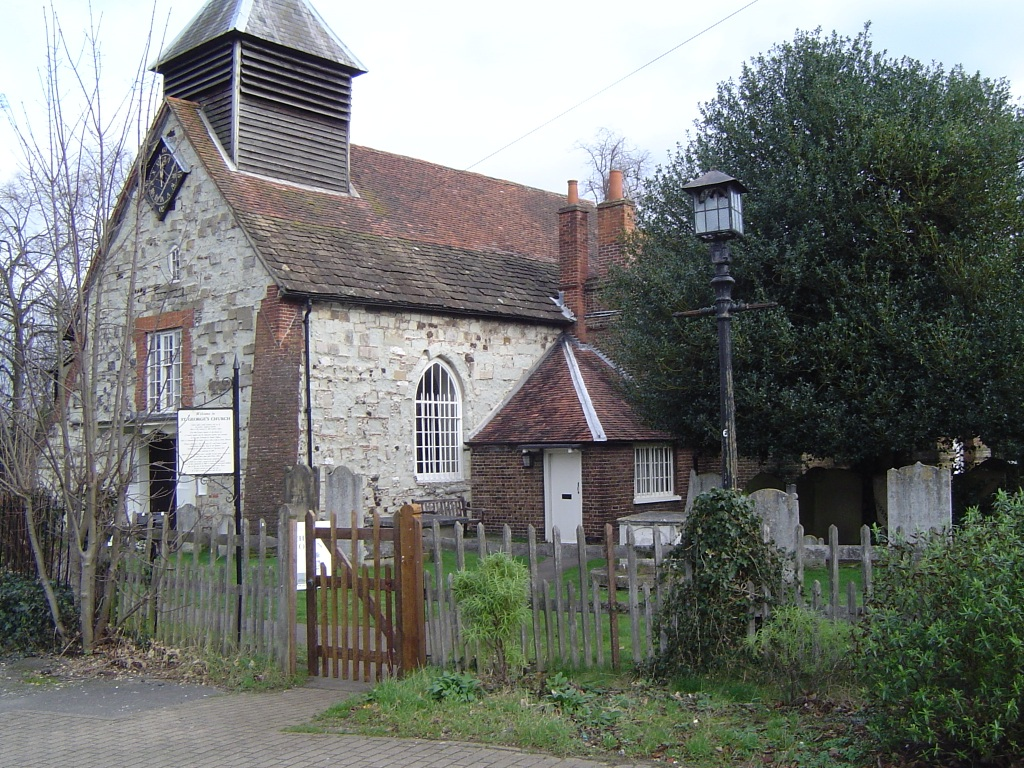
St. George's Church, Esher. Smallpeice was President of the Friends of St. George's Church

Smallpeice married twice, firstly, he married Kathleen (Kay) Singleton in 1931. Kay was a school friend of Smallpeice's sister who was some four years younger. He also had a younger brother, who was five years younger. Kay was diagnosed with an illness of the blood in December 1968 and following a second bout of illness, died on 2 February 1973, following 41 years of marriage.

He married for a second time on 2 November 1973 to Rita Burns, who had been his secretary at Cunard, and they remained married until his death on 12 July 1992.

Smallpeice was appointed a Knight Commander of the Royal Victorian Order in 1961 for services to the sovereign, this was for his work in organising flights for the Queen and other members of the royal family whilst with BOAC.

Smallpeice was also honoured by various other countries, and was made a member of the National Order of the Cedar by Lebanon in 1955. The United States honoured Smallpeice by giving him the Key to the City of San Francisco in 1959. He was also honoured with a Pioneers Award for his contributions to the development of container shipping by the Containerization Institute in New York during 1981.

His interests outside of industry resulted in him serving as chairman of The English Speaking Union of the Commonwealth from 1965 to 1968, succeeding Lord Baillieu. He served his local communities as chairman of the Leatherhead New Theatre (Thorndike) Trust from 1966 to 1974 and after moving to Cobham, was President of the Friends of Cobham cottage hospital from 1987 and President of the Friends of St. George's Church, Esher, also from 1987. He was a member of the London clubs Athenaeum and Boodle's, and of the Melbourne Club in Melbourne, Australia, and enjoyed golfing and gardening as recreational activities.

Her Majesty The Queen was represented at Smallpeice's funeral by Lieutenant-Commander Sir Russell Wood, an Extra Gentleman Usher in the Royal Household. (Note: St. George's Church, Esher was no longer used for regular services, and the funeral service took place in the larger Christ Church, Esher.)
