= Matthew Slattery =

British naval officer and businessman

Rear-Admiral Sir Matthew Slattery KBE CB FRAeS
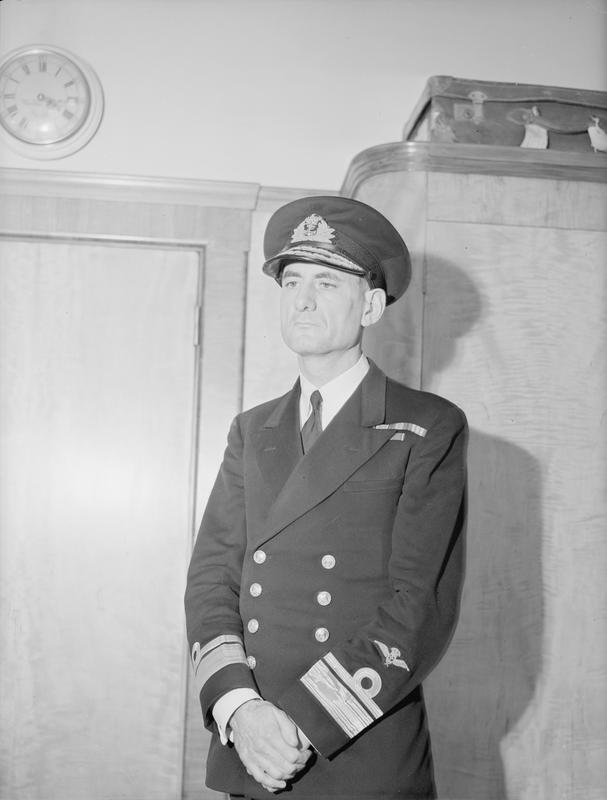
- Matthew Slattery in uniform, 1943
- Born: 12 May 1902; Bromley, London
- Died: 16 March 1990 (aged 87); Warninglid, West Sussex
- Education: Royal Naval College, Osborne; Royal Naval College, Dartmouth
- Occupations: Naval officer and company director
- Board member of: Short Brothers and Harland (1949–1960); Bristol Aeroplane Company (1957–1960); National Bank (1959–1960, 1963–1969); British Overseas Airways Corporation (1960–1963); Hawthorn Leslie and Company (1967–1973)
- Spouse: Mica Mary

Rear-Admiral Sir Matthew Sausse Slattery, KBE, CB, FRAeS (12 May 1902 – 16 March 1990) was a British naval officer, military aviator and businessman. He was the managing director and chairman of Short Brothers and Harland, chairman of British Overseas Airways Corporation and latterly served as chairman of Hawthorn Leslie and Company. He was also a board member of Bristol Aeroplane Company and The National Bank.

== Early life ==
Slattery was born in Bromley, London on 12 May 1902. His father was Henry Francis Slattery and his mother was Agnes Slattery (née Cuddon). His father served as the chairman of The National Bank from 1888 to his death in 1911, and had other business interests, serving as the chairman of the Brecon and Merthyr Tydfil Junction Railway, and as a director of several other railways and a number of insurance companies.

Slattery was privately educated at Stonyhurst College before joining the Royal Navy on 15 January 1916, aged 13. He would continue his education at the Royal Naval College, Osborne, then the Royal Naval College, Dartmouth.

== Military career ==
Slattery was commissioned as a sub-lieutenant on 30 September 1923, then promoted to lieutenant on 19 June 1924. His early assignments included service aboard the monitor ship HMS Erebus, and service with the Fleet Air Arm (at the time, part of the Royal Air Force). Slattery was one of a small number of naval officers who took the first Fleet Air Arm training course in 1924, qualifying as a pilot at Netheravon Airfield.

He was promoted to lieutenant commander on 30 September 1931, after eight years service. His service as a lieutenant commander included service as the flight commander for 450 (Fleet Reconnaissance) Flight on the aircraft carrier HMS Courageous, and attachment to the Admiralty. Slattery was an early proponent of deck landings aboard ships thanks to his involvement with the Fleet Air Arm, and would remain heavily involved with carrier borne aircraft for the remainder of his naval career.

He was attached to the Royal Air Force during this time, and held the rank of flight lieutenant until November 1932. He was re-attached to the Royal Air Force in 1934, and held the rank of squadron leader.

He was promoted to commander at the end of 1934 whilst still attached to the Royal Air Force, shortly after, he was given his first command - the destroyer HMS Winchelsea. He would also command the heavy cruiser HMS Sussex before moving to the Admiralty. Slattery was again attached to the Royal Air Force during 1938, and held the rank of wing commander.

Slattery was promoted to captain at the end of 1938, whilst still attached to the Royal Air Force, and was, at the time, the Royal Navy's youngest captain. He would be assigned the role Director of Air Material and then Director-General of Naval Aircraft Development and Production, Ministry of Aircraft Production. His work in these roles resulted in further development of the Fairey Swordfish and the introduction of the Hawker Sea Hurricane and the Supermarine Seafire.

The command of HMS Cleopatra followed in late 1941 and lasted through to June 1942, in what would be an eventful assignment. His next posting was to Kenya as Chief Staff Officer to Commodore-in-Charge Naval Air Stations at Mackinnon Road, before returning to the UK in February 1943, taking up the role of Chief Naval Representative, Ministry of Aircraft Production & Director-General of Naval Aircraft Development and Production. Slattery was promoted to commodore at the time of this posting.

Slattery's final promotion, to the rank of rear-admiral occurred between June 1944 and July 1945, and his final role with the Royal Navy was a continuation of his previous role, with additional responsibilities, serving as Vice-Controller (Air), Chief of Naval Air Equipment and Chief Naval Representative and Director-General of Naval Aircraft Development and Production.

He retired from the Royal Navy in 1948.

== Business career ==
Slattery's business interests directly related to his military work; he was directly involved with aerospace and shipbuilding industries when he retired from active service.

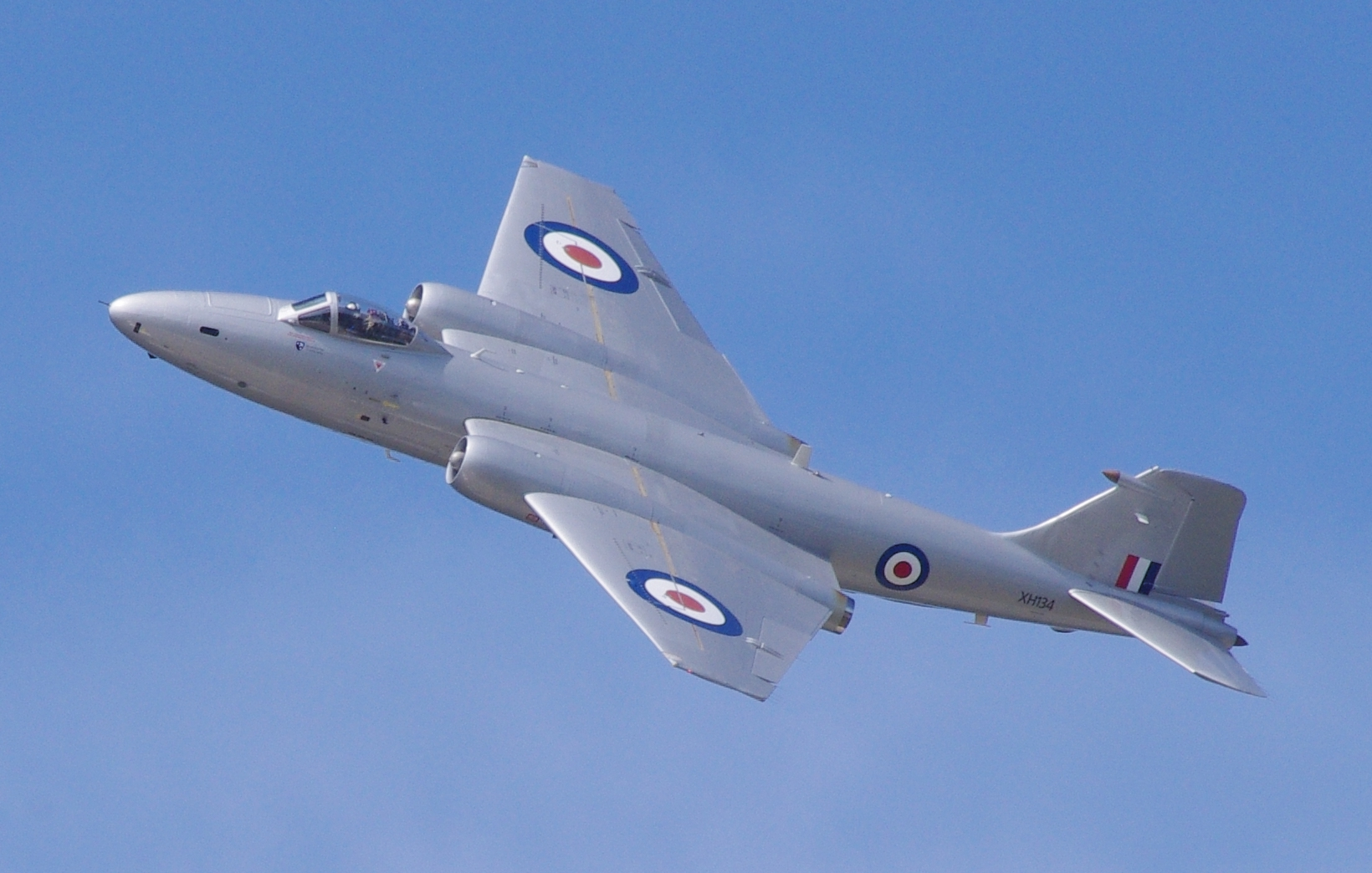
Short Brothers built English Electric Canberra XH134

His first role, and that which he would hold for longest, was as managing director of the Northern Ireland-based Short Brothers and Harland, a role that he took up in 1948. He served solely as managing director until 1952, then additionally took on the role of chairman. Short Brothers and Harland main work was manufacturing aircraft under contract and licence agreements with the Ministry of Supply and other aircraft builders. He was joined at Short Brothers and Harland by the naval aviator Captain Henry St John Fancourt, who served under Slattery as the Deputy Chief Naval Representative, Ministry of Aircraft Production.

Slattery led Short Brothers and Harland at a time when they developed a number of experimental aircraft designs, though none would see significant production. The Short SC.1 was one of a number of experimental designs produced by Shorts, and is notable for being Britain's first vertical take-off and landing (VTOL) aircraft. The SC.1 pre-dated (and aided in the development of) the Hawker Siddeley Harrier.

He was appointed by Prime Minister of the United Kingdom Harold Macmillan in 1957 to become a special adviser on the transport of Middle East oil, with a brief on advising the Government how to avoid supply and delivery difficulties of the sort which had been encountered during the Suez Crisis.

Slattery was elected to the board of Bristol, and appointed chairman of Bristol's aircraft manufacturing subsidiary, the Bristol Airplane Company in 1957. Bristol (which had established a 15.25% shareholding in Short Brothers and Harland in 1954) would sign an agreement with Slattery for the production of the Bristol Britannia; at first it was expected that the turboprop airliner would be a sales success and the additional production line would be necessary to meet customer demand. The prolonged and troubled development of the Britannia resulted in the design being quickly overtaken by the Boeing 707, Douglas DC-8 and for British customers in particular, the Vickers VC10. Short Brothers developed the Britannia into the Britannic 1, making use of many Britannia components including the wing and landing gear. The Britannic 1 was developed into the Britannic 3A (entering service as the Shorts Belfast) and had far less in common with the Britannia.

Just prior to his appointment with BOAC, he had taken up a position as a director of The National Bank, continuing the close association of the Slattery family with the bank. He would return to The National Bank after his period with BOAC.

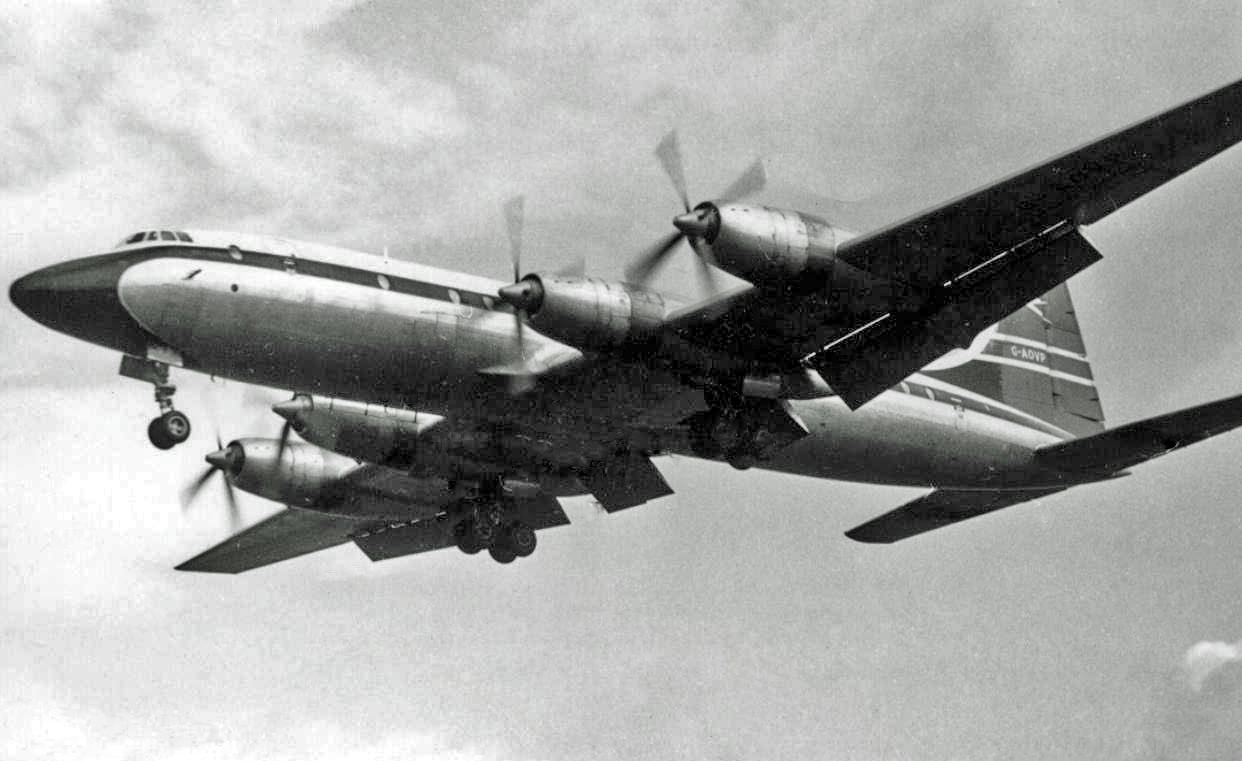
Bristol Britannia - Slattery oversaw their production as Bristol Aircraft chairman and then their operation as BOAC chairman

Slattery took over as chairman of the state owned carrier BOAC on 29 July 1960, after Gerard d'Erlanger stood down from the role to return to his other business interests. Slattery served as chairman on a full-time basis unlike d'Erlanger, who held the position on a part-time basis. The appointment to BOAC ended Slattery's 12 years with Shorts, he was replaced as chairman by his predecessor as Bristol Aircraft chairman, Cyril Uwins. Slattery also joined the Airworthiness Requirements Board around the time of his appointment with BOAC.

Slattery retained Basil Smallpeice as managing director, and the duo set about cutting costs at the airline as the deterioration which had begun under d'Erlanger's tenure continued. BOAC would incur significant losses in 1961 and 1962 amidst decreasing passenger loadings, comparatively high maintenance costs and ongoing payments to Vickers for the VC10 orders.

Basil Smallpeice, concerned about the financial performance of BOAC, the additional competition from Cunard Eagle Airways and the inability to obtain additional Boeing 707 aircraft any other way, began talks in April 1962 to merge BOAC's North Atlantic operations with those of Cunard Eagle. Agreement was reached in early June 1962 on ownership percentages, and the newly formed company, BOAC-Cunard, began operations later that month. The new airline would operate all the transatlantic services of BOAC and Cunard Eagle from 1962 to 1966. Slattery served as chairman of the joint venture, in addition to his role as chairman of BOAC itself.

The downturn in the aviation sector and fraught relations between Julian Amery, the new Minister of Aviation and BOAC concerning writing off debt (much of it incurred buying and troubleshooting new British aircraft) resulted in a further deterioration in relations between the airline and government. Amery commissioned an independent report into the financial performance of BOAC, undertaken by John Corbett. The ongoing disagreement about the funding arrangements for BOAC and the need for new Vickers VC10 aircraft would eventually be resolved in late 1963, when Slattery formally retired as chairman, though this was widely seen as a resignation; Slattery commented in 1964 that he had effectively been sacked.

Giles Guthrie, a respected aviator, merchant banker and director of British European Airways took over from Slattery as chairman. He credited the Slattery and Smallpeice management team for BOAC's return to profitability in 1964.

Slattery returned to The National Bank, retaking his seat on the board of directors after leaving BOAC. He was also involved in the negotiations that the British Government undertook during 1966 to diversify Short Brothers and the connected Harland and Wolff shipbuilding business, following downturns in both businesses.

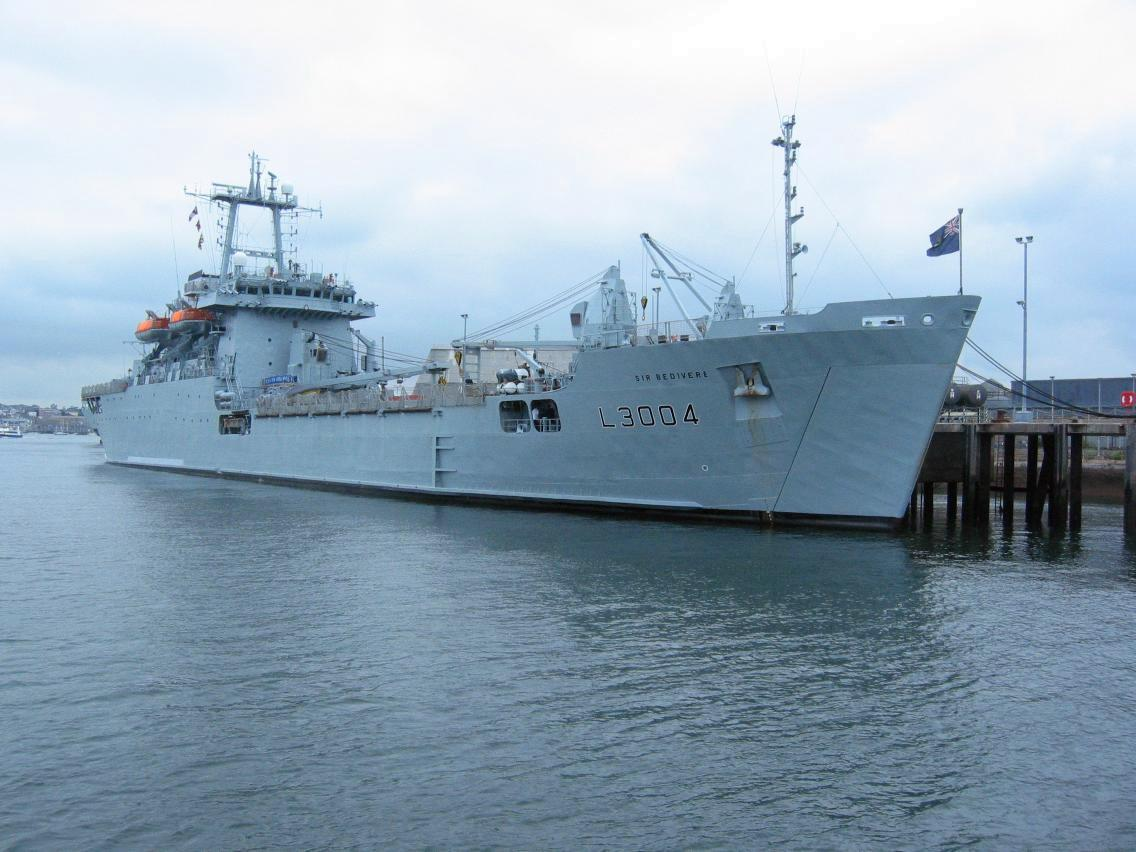
RFA Sir Bedivere, a Royal Fleet Auxiliary ship built by Hawthorn Leslie and Company whilst Slattery was chairman

His next significant position was at the shipbuilder Hawthorn Leslie and Company, joining the board in 1964 and taking the role of chairman in 1966. The British shipbuilding industry at the time was in a period of significant upheaval, with changes in the shipping industry (particularly containerisation, which was being pioneered by Basil Smallpeice at Cunard) reducing demand for the traditional types of ship built in Britain. The Geddes Report broadly encouraged rationalisation of the British shipbuilding industry, and Hawthorn Leslie would merge their shipbuilding assets with those of Swan Hunter, John Readhead & Sons and the River Tyne assets of Vickers-Armstrongs to form Swan Hunter Group in 1968.

Hawthorn Leslie would take a 16.36% stake in the combined Swan Hunter Group (formally Swan Hunter Shipbuilders Limited), holding this until 1977 when the entire shipbuilding industry was nationalised to form British Shipbuilders. Slattery served as a director of the Swan Hunter Group from the time of the merger in 1968 through to 1973, when he retired from Hawthorn Leslie and Company.

Slattery's final role before retirement was with the Air Registration Board, having joined in 1960, he retired from the ARB in May 1974. He was first appointed to the ARB as an operators representative (and was succeeded in this role on the board by Giles Guthrie). He remained on the board after leaving BOAC, and took over from the late John Moore-Brabazon, 1st Baron Brabazon of Tara as an independent representative.

== Personal life ==
Slattery was married once, to Mica Mary Swain, daughter of Colonel DG Swain. They married in 1925 and had three children, two sons and one daughter. Their son, David Antony Slattery, was a noted occupational physician who served as Rolls-Royce plc's chief medical officer and later lectured at the University of Liverpool. Mica survived her husband and died in 1998.

Slattery was honoured several times during his career. He was first appointed a Companion of the Order of the Bath in the 1946 New Year Honours for his work with the Ministry of Aircraft Supply. He was then knighted (as a Knight Bachelor) in the 1955 New Year Honours for his work with Shotts and Harland. He was subsequently appointed a Knight Commander of the Most Excellent Order of the British Empire in the 1960 New Year Honours for his work advising the government on the transport of oil from the Middle East.

The United States of America honoured Slattery with the Legion of Merit (Degree of Commander) in 1945, whilst in 1954, Queen's University Belfast awarded him an honorary Doctor of Science degree. He was appointed as a Fellow of the Royal Aeronautical Society in 1946, a significant honour for those involved in the aviation industry.

Slattery listed his hobbies as "country pursuits" in his Who's Who entry.

Business positions
Preceded by Gerard d'Erlanger	BOAC Chairman; 1960–1964	Succeeded by Giles Guthrie
