= Giles Guthrie =

English merchant banker (1916–79)

Sir Giles Guthrie Bt OBE DSC JP
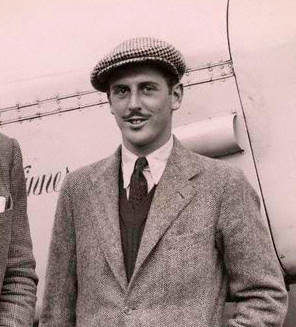
- Guthrie in 1936
- Born: 21 March 1916; City of Westminster, London
- Died: 31 December 1979 (aged 63); Rozel, Jersey
- Education: Eton College; University of Cambridge (Magdalene College)
- Occupations: Company director and aviator
- Board member of: North Central Wagon Company (1946–1964); British European Airways (1959–1968); Radio Rentals (−1964); Prudential Assurance (1963–1964); British Overseas Airways Corporation (1964–1968)
- Spouse(s): Rhona, Lady Guthrie
- Children: Malcolm Connop Guthrie
- Parent: Connop Guthrie

Sir Giles Connop McEachern Guthrie, 2nd Baronet, OBE, DSC, JP (21 March 1916 – 31 December 1979) was an English aviator, merchant banker and later, an airline industry executive, serving as the chairman and chief executive of the state owned airline British Overseas Airways Corporation (BOAC).

== Early life ==
Giles Guthrie was born in Westminster, London on 21 March 1916. His father was Connop Thirlwall Robert Guthrie, a merchant banker and public servant, and his mother was Eila Mary Guthrie (née McEacharn), eldest daughter of Sir Malcolm McEacharn, an Australian shipping magnate and former Mayor of Melbourne.

He was educated at Eton College and at Magdalene College, Cambridge.

His father, Connop, had served as an officer during the early stages of World War I but following injury, managed the American operations of the Ministry of Shipping. He took up business roles after the war, directing City General Trust before purchasing North Central Wagon Company in a joint venture with Prudential Assurance in 1928. He served as North Central Wagon Company's chairman from 1928 to 1939.

Connop was appointed Knight Commander of the Order of the British Empire (KBE) in the 1918 New Year Honours for his war service with the Ministry of Shipping, and the Guthrie baronetcy was created for Connop in the 1936 New Year Honours.

== Flying career ==
Guthrie learned to fly on the de Havilland Tiger Moth whilst a student at Eton College aged 16, and was awarded his Private pilot licence on turning 17. He continued flying whilst at Cambridge, taking ownership of a Percival Vega Gull, an aircraft he flew extensively in 1936 and 1937, competing in several competitions as a co-pilot to Charles Gardner. Their partnership culminated in their victory in the 1936 King's Cup Race.

C. W. A. Scott and Giles Guthrie (as co-pilot) won The Schlesinger African Air Race (a race between Portsmouth and Johannesburg) in 1936, flying Guthrie's Vega Gull. The Guthrie Wing of King's College Hospital was named in his honour to commemorate their victory.

Guthrie replaced his Vega Gull with the Percival Mew Gull, a dedicated racing aircraft, in 1937, and in the same year, he was awarded his commercial pilot license. Gardner and Guthrie retained the King's Cup Race in 1937, having flown the Mew Gull. He piloted the Mew Gull himself in 1938, coming second to future Supermarine Spitfire test pilot Alex Henshaw, who was also flying a Percival Mew Gull. They both completed the course at an average speed well in excess of 200 miles per hour (320 km/h), Henshaw at 236.25 miles per hour (380.21 km/h) and Guthrie at 220.5 miles per hour (354.9 km/h).

He went to work for British Airways, where he held a number of roles in the traffic and commercial departments. His fluency in French and German meant he was stationed in Paris, Berlin and finally Warsaw, with his posting there lasting until 29 August 1939, two days before the German invasion of Poland and four days before the formal declaration of war between the United Kingdom and Germany.

=== World War II ===
World War II would see Guthrie serve as a pilot with the Royal Navy Fleet Air Arm. He trained at HMS Raven (Eastleigh) before joining 808 Naval Air Squadron. His first posting with 808 Naval Air Squadron was on dockyard and Scapa Flow protection duties, flying Fairey Fulmars from various bases around the British coast. 808 Naval Air Squadron was next assigned to the aircraft carrier HMS Ark Royal together with 807 Naval Air Squadron, operating in the Atlantic and Mediterranean theatres. This posting lasted from September 1940 to November 1941, when Ark Royal was sunk by an enemy torpedo. Guthrie was on board at the time. 808 Naval Air Squadron pilots, including Guthrie, would also fly Hawker Hurricane aircraft from Gibraltar during this time.

Guthrie and other personnel aboard HMS Ark Royal were recognised for their gallantry in the Mediterranean; Guthrie was awarded the Distinguished Service Cross for his involvement in a sortie defending a Maltese convoy from enemy action, despite being significantly outnumbered by enemy aircraft.

The sinking of Ark Royal saw 808 Naval Air Squadron merge with 807 Naval Air Squadron and disband, reforming a year later. Guthrie did not join the merged 807 Naval Air Squadron; instead he returned to the UK and joined the Naval Air Fighting Development Unit (NAFDU) operating from RAF Duxford, alongside their RAF counterpart, the Air Fighting Development Unit. There, Guthrie was involved in flight testing almost every single- and twin-engined aircraft entering service with the Royal Navy Fleet Air Arm, and involving himself in development work, such as testing the Wilbur R. Franks designed G-suit in Supermarine Seafires.

Guthrie remained with the NAFDU until the end of the war, by which time he had risen to second in command and promoted to acting lieutenant commander. He was appointed an Officer of the Order of the British Empire, Military Division (OBE) in the 1946 New Year Honours.

He flew a Chrislea Ace and a Stinson Reliant from Gatwick Airport after the war, but increasing demands on both his time and that of Gatwick Airport resulted in his eventual retirement from flying, and he let his pilots licence lapse after 1953.

== Business career ==
Guthrie had initially been offered a role with British Overseas Airways Corporation immediately after the war, but the death of his father on 28 September 1945 made this difficult and he would instead manage the Guthrie family's business interests, which included the shareholding in North Central Wagon Company. He was appointed to the board of North Central in August 1946, at their annual general meeting.

He initially asked Edward Heath in 1946 to join North Central as the deputy chairman, with a view to him taking over as chairman, but Heath, who was interested in running for Parliament, thought moving from London to Rotherham, where North Central was based, would be damaging to his political ambitions and turned down the offer.

Guthrie, in addition to his North Central role, served as managing director of the merchant bank Brown, Shipley & Co., and he would again offer Edward Heath a role, in 1949, as a trainee banker. The role was to provide a source of income for Heath, who had already been selected as the prospective parliamentary candidate for Bexley, and who would be elected to Parliament at the 1950 General Election, held in February.

Guthrie took up the deputy chairman role at North Central Wagon Company himself, serving from 1960 to 1964. He also served on the board of Radio Rentals until 1964, and served on the board of Prudential Assurance Company from May 1963 to January 1964. He was appointed to fill the vacant seat on the Prudential board created by the death of Donald Fergusson in March 1963, and it was widely expected he would become Prudential's chairman.

=== Aviation industry ===
His knowledge of aviation and finance made him an ideal candidate for board positions with the state-owned British airlines; firstly he was appointed to the board of British European Airways in April 1959 then in 1963, he was appointed to the board of British Overseas Airways Corporation, where he took over from Matthew Slattery as chairman and Basil Smallpeice as managing director, taking the additional title of chief executive. He took up his position on 1 January 1964, relinquishing all but his British European Airways board appointment when taking up the BOAC role; the Government wished for closer co-operation between BOAC and BEA, and it was agreed that Guthrie would remain on the BEA board to facilitate this.

Guthrie joined the Air Registration Board (predecessor of the Civil Aviation Authority) in September 1964, serving as an airline representative. He was appointed at the same time as his predecessor at BOAC, Matthew Slattery and aircraft engine designer Stanley Hooker. He also served on the executive committee of the International Air Transport Association from 1964 to 1968.

BOAC was suffering from significant financial problems when Guthrie took over, and the airline had run at a loss from 1958 through to 1963, returning to profitability in 1963–1964. BOAC's debt stood at approximately £80 million by 1964, all financed by the government. This indebtedness was further exacerbated by the airline being ordered by the government to purchase British-built aircraft it had little or no requirement for, and as a result, a capital borrowing facility of £180 million was made available in 1961–1962 to finance the purchase of 35 Vickers VC10 jet aircraft. The plans to acquire the Vickers VC10, which would eventually call for a fleet of 45 to be purchased by 1967, resulted in the resignations of Matthew Slattery, Guthrie's predecessor as chairman, and his managing director, Basil Smallpeice. They believed BOAC had no requirement for all the aircraft ordered, that the Vickers VC10 would be too expensive to operate, and that the government's 'Buy British' policy would prevent the airline from returning to profitability.

Guthrie was employed specifically to tackle the financial issues at the airline and restore its long-term profitability. His initial proposals involved complementary decisions to reduce the number of destinations and routes served, and scaling back the size of the fleet, which was planned to reach 100 aircraft by 1970. Guthrie initially planned for a fleet of 39 aircraft by 1967, consisting of the 12 Vickers Standard VC10s which had been delivered or which were under construction, and 27 Boeing 707s. This would be achieved by cancelling the order for 30 Vickers Super VC10 aircraft and purchasing 6 additional Boeing 707 jets instead, with more ordered if needed. His final request when taking up his appointment was that the airline's debt of £80m should be written off by the government, and the company refinanced, as if it was a new start-up.

Julian Amery, Minister of Aviation agreed to the majority of Guthrie's plan, the only major exception being the outright cancellation of the Vickers VC10, which wasn't authorised. The routes to South America were divested to British United Airways, the debt owed to government was written off and refinancing of the airline completed with an investment of £30m from the government. Amery allowed the order for 30 Super VC10s to be reduced to 17 aircraft; three of the remaining aircraft were diverted to the Royal Air Force and the remaining 10 airframes cancelled during early production, which would give BOAC a fleet of 29 Vickers VC10 aircraft in total. Guthrie resumed flying and captained proving flights of the VC10, including a transatlantic demonstration to Boston. BOAC were permitted to purchase two Boeing 707 freighters during 1965 and after taking full ownership of the BOAC-Cunard joint venture, the two Boeing 707 passenger jets which Cunard Line had contributed to the joint venture (through their Cunard Eagle Airways subsidiary) passed to BOAC.

Passenger growth and load factors quickly increased under Guthrie's tenure, and he invested in larger aircraft with more passenger capacity than either the Vickers Super VC10 or the Boeing 707 could provide. Boeing and Pan American World Airways had worked together to develop the Boeing 747 and it quickly became apparent that to compete with Pan American on the north Atlantic routes, BOAC would need to operate either the Boeing 747 or a broadly comparable jet. Guthrie successfully resisted pressure to purchase a proposed double-deck variant of the Vickers Super VC10, and was given permission to place an order for six Boeing 747-100 aircraft in August 1966.

Guthrie's tenure at BOAC was marred by a two fatal incidents; the first, BOAC Flight 911, occurred in March 1966 when a Boeing 707 experienced clear-air turbulence whilst overflying Mount Fuji in Japan. The crash resulted in the deaths of all 124 passengers and crew, the most deadly accident involving a British airline to date. Guthrie travelled to Japan to be involved in the investigation. The second fatal accident, BOAC Flight 712, also involved a Boeing 707. The aircraft suffered an un-contained engine failure during takeoff; returning to Heathrow, the engine separated from the wing, causing the wing to catch fire. The aircraft cabin was destroyed by fire, and five people were killed.

Guthrie would attempt to deal with industrial relations issues and strike action which affected BOAC, like many state-owned companies in the 1960s and 1970s. He was largely successful and left the company with only a pay dispute with pilots unresolved, an issue that would continue on for several more years, delaying the Boeing 747's introduction by a year to 1971. He was responsible for cutting the executive headcount by a quarter, and more than 3,000 staff made redundant, with some being replaced by the new computer systems he introduced to streamline the business.

He announced in May 1968 that he did not wish to be re-appointed for a second five-year term as chairman and chief executive of BOAC, relinquishing his BOAC appointment and related board positions at the end of 1968. BOAC had made £62 million in profits since 1964 and generated cash reserves of almost £80 million at the time of his announcement. Guthrie, when interviewed in The Times days before his formal resignation, explained that the airline had public dividend capital of £50 million, the government loan capital of £30 million and £61 million in cash reserves, and with an expected profit of £12 million to £15 million in 1968–1969, BOAC's finances would be almost exactly where he had intended them to be when he took up his role in 1964; he wanted £80 million in capital and £80 million in reserves at the end of the five-year period running from 1964 to 1968. He also indicated the problems inherent with the separate BOAC and BEA structures during this interview, something that would be resolved when BOAC and BEA merged to form British Airways in March 1974.

== Other interests ==
Guthrie's exit from BOAC allowed him to establish Air Transport Insurance and Air Transport Guarantee, mutual self-insurance pools owned by the International Air Transport Association (IATA) and the Air Transport Association of America with the purpose of partially insuring their members new Boeing 747 aircraft. He would serve as Air Transport Insurance and Air Transport Guarantee's chairman alongside director-general Clarence Pell until 1971.

In 1966, the Guthries survived an armed robbery attempt at their Gatwick home and Giles wife, Rhona, was shot when she tried to disarm a burglar who was aiming a gun at Giles. He believed that Rhona had saved his life in the process. The armed robbery prompted the Guthrie family to move to the Channel Island of Jersey the same year. They purchased a sizeable house situated in its own valley, and Rhona, Lady Guthrie set about renovating the overgrown gardens.

Guthrie once again became involved in local government after his move to Jersey, he served as the chairman of a Water Inquiry Board set up by Jersey's Public Works Committee. He had previously served as a magistrate in West Sussex in 1955.

He was financial adviser to the Jersey Wildlife Preservation Trust, and helped arrange for the purchase of Les Augrès Manor in 1971, to secure the property permanently for the Trust.

He was a keen sportsman; he played cricket for Lowfield Heath Cricket Club, prior to the expansion of Gatwick Airport which resulted in the village of Lowfield Heath being redeveloped. He was a member of the Marylebone Cricket Club and of the Royal Yacht Squadron where he owned and raced several yachts.

Guthrie and other members of the Royal Yacht Squadron were interested in challenging for the America's Cup in 1961, but decided against mounting a challenge. Guthrie would have led a syndicate owning one of four boats, the fastest of which would have gone forward to challenge the New York Yacht Club for the trophy.

== Family ==
Guthrie was married on 17 July 1939 to Rhona Leslie Stileman; the engagement was announced on 12 April 1939. Giles and Rhona had three children.

- Neil Guthrie (1940–1940); died eight days after birth.
- Malcolm Connop Guthrie (1942–); married Victoria Willcock on 30 September 1967 and succeeded to the baronetcy on the death of his father in 1979. They have two children:

- Islay Mary Welcome Guthrie (1968–)
- Giles Malcolm Welcome Guthrie (1972–); heir apparent.

- Alistair Peter Guthrie (1946–1986); married Elizabeth Dorothy Margaret Schaposchnikoff on 22 March 1966. They had two children:

- Alexander Valentine Connop Guthrie (1966–)
- Barnaby Giles Guthrie (1969–)

Giles Guthrie died at his Rozel, Jersey home on 31 December 1979 from a malignant brain tumour. His eldest surviving son, Malcolm Connop Guthrie succeeded to the baronetcy. His wife, Rhona, survived him and continued to live on Jersey until her death in 2012 aged 93.

Baronetage of the United Kingdom
Preceded by Connop Guthrie	Baronet (of Brent Eleigh Hall); 1945–1979	Succeeded by Malcolm Connop Guthrie
Business positions
Preceded by Matthew Slattery	BOAC Chairman; 1964–1968	Succeeded by Charles Hardie
