= Patrick Wilson (composer) =

Patrick Wilson is a Sussex born musician/composer who was educated at Hurstpierpoint College where he formed his first band. In 1982 his composition and production skills attracted the attention of 'godfather of library music' Robin Phillips, MD of Bruton Music. With Bruton, Patrick's music quickly became popular in movies, TV and commercials, including 'Dumb & Dumber', themes tunes for C4's pioneering 'Parliament Programme', GMTV's 'Breakfast TV' and the first major 'Gossard Wonderbra' commercial.

Patrick has released many records and CD's over the years and is now composing Polish mezzo-soprano Renata Jonscher's new CD. Their videos have gained wide popularity via Classic FMTV and now feature daily on Sky channel 369 (oMusic TV).

== Movies ==
- Beavis and Butthead
- Before Sunrise (1995)
- Dead Ringers (1988)
- Dumb and Dumber (1994)
- Garbage Warrior (2008 movie score)
- Honey I Shrunk the Kids (1989)
- Madame Sousatzka (1988)
- Spy Hard (1996)
- The Birdcage (1996)
- The Juror (1996)
- Two Moon Junction (1988)
- Up Close and Personal (1996)

== CDs and records ==
- 2006 Renata Jonscher & Neil Jenkins 'Eternal Light' (CD/Video Classic MTV)
- 2006 Renata Jonscher 'Entelechy' (CD/Video Classic MTV)
- 1995 Co.Inside 'It's gonna be great (CD)
- 1995 L'Esprit 'Language of Touch' (CD)
- 1994 PWM 'Music to Make Love to' (Sony CD)
- 1993 Magnox - 'When will we be free' (12")
- 1993 Optimystiks 'Universaluvibe' (12")
