= William Edwards (Kent cricketer) =

English cricketer

Personal information
- Born: 27 June 1859; Bloomsbury, Middlesex
- Died: 21 August 1947 (aged 88); Euston, London
- Batting: Right-handed
- Bowling: Right-arm slow
- Role: All-rounder

Domestic team information
- Years: Team
- 1884: Kent
- FC debut: 21 August 1884 Kent v Lancashire
- Last FC: 1 September 1884 Kent v Surrey
- Source: Cricinfo, 9 March 2017

William Edwards (27 June 1859 – 21 August 1947) was an English cricketer. He played two first-class matches for Kent County Cricket Club in 1884.

Edwards was born at Bloomsbury in 1859, the son of Francis and Kezia Edwards (née Lewis). His father was an architect and surveyor and Edwards was educated at Hurstpierpoint College. He played cricket for the school team in 1875 and was a keen club cricketer, playing for the Granville club at Lee. He captained the Granville team between 1883 and 1892.

Described as a "talented allrounder", Edwards scored over 800 runs and took more than 70 wickets for Granville in 1884 and was given his first-class debut by Kent towards the end of the season. He played in two matches, the first against Lancashire at Maidstone in late August and the second, Kent's final match of the season, against Surrey at The Oval. He made a "promising score" of 25 runs in his first innings, but made a total of only 44 across the two matches. Against Surrey he took three wickets in their second innings in his only extended spell of bowling.

Following a broken leg during the 1884–85 association football season, Edwards did not play again for Kent and, although he still played club cricket with success, the injury seems to have limited his performance. Edwards' highlights in club cricket include scoring a century and taking seven wickets for four runs (6/4) for Granville against Croydon, and taking nine wickets in an innings for AR Layman's XI against St John's College―at a cost of only three runs.

Professionally Edwards worked as a solicitor. He died at Euston in London in 1947; he was aged 88.

== Bibliography ==
- Carlaw, Derek (2020). Kent County Cricketers, A to Z: Part One (1806–1914) (PDF). Cardiff: ACS.
