= Art Sherwood =

American entrepreneurship professor

Arthur Lloyd "Art" Sherwood is an American professor of entrepreneurship. He is the David Cole Professor of Entrepreneurship at Western Washington University (WWU).

Sherwood attended the University of Wisconsin–Madison for a Bachelor of Business Administration degree and Indiana University Bloomington for his MBA and PhD in business. He was given a teaching award from Indiana University in 2000 and completed his doctoral program in 2002. He later became a professor of management at Indiana State University.

In 2013, Western Washington University alumnus David W. Cole, a retired vice president at Microsoft, endowed the David Cole Professorship of Entrepreneurship within the WWU College of Business and Economics. Sherwood was hired the next year. He gave a TEDx talk at WWU in 2015, in which he posited that the intersection between wealth and social health—coined whealth—is attainable.

He has published on the "entrepreneurship ecosystem" and the role of higher education institutions within it.
