= Thomas Fielden (musician) =

British pianist and music teacher

Thomas Perceval Fielden (24 November 1883 – 15 September 1974) was a British pianist and music teacher. He was director of music at three public schools (Hurstpierpoint College, Fettes and Charterhouse) and was Professor of Pianoforte at the Royal College of Music for over 30 years. He wrote on the subject of piano technique and gave many recitals.

== Life ==
Fielden, who was born in Chichester on 24 November 1883, was educated at the Royal College of Music (1902–1905) then at Jesus College, Oxford, where he was organ scholar and obtained BA and BMus degrees. He then studied piano in Berlin, and gave recitals in Germany, Paris and London. He was director of music at various public schools: Hurstpierpoint College (1903–1908), Fettes (1908–1912) and Charterhouse (1928–1947). He was commissioned as a lieutenant in the Royal Artillery in 1915, and served as lieutenant in the Royal Naval Volunteer Reserve from 1943 to 1945. He was Professor of Pianoforte at the Royal College of Music from 1921 to 1952, when he retired, although he then took up an appointment as Principal of the Rhodesian Academy of Music in Bulawayo, leaving in 1958. He continued to examine candidates on behalf of the Associated Board of the Royal Schools of Music, giving recitals as he went. His publications were on the topic of advanced piano technique, such as The Science of Pianoforte Technique (1927) and Music and Character (1929).
