= Christopher Nourse =

British arts administrator (born 1946)

Christopher Stuart Nourse (born August 1946) is a British arts administrator.

Nourse was born in Salisbury, Wiltshire and educated at Hurstpierpoint College, followed by a bachelor's degree in law, politics and philosophy from the University of Edinburgh, and the Middle Temple.

Nourse was administrative director of Sadler's Wells Royal Ballet (now Birmingham Royal Ballet), assistant to the general director at the Royal Opera House, administrative director of the Royal Opera House Trust, executive director of Rambert Dance Company, and managing director of English National Ballet. Subsequent freelance work included administrating the National Dance Awards and establishing and project managing the annual Dance Proms at the Royal Albert Hall. He has been chairman of the Dancers' Pension Scheme and a Trustee of the Candoco Dance Company and of Youth Dance England.

Nourse is executive director of the Frederick Ashton Foundation. He is also a Governor of The Royal Ballet Companies and School and chairman of the Dame Margot Fonteyn Scholarship Fund.

Nourse is in a civil partnership with Charles Shu Ming Chan and lives in central London. He is a member of the Travellers Club and an Honorary Steward of Westminster Abbey.
