= Arthur Sharood =

English cricketer

Personal information
- Full name: Arthur John Sharood
- Born: 9 August 1856; Hurstpierpoint, Sussex, England
- Died: 31 March 1895 (aged 38); Axim, Gold Coast
- Batting: Right-handed
- Bowling: Right-arm fast-medium

Domestic team information
- Years: Team
- 1879: Sussex

Career statistics
Competition	First-class
Matches	1
Runs scored	–
Batting average	–
100s/50s	–/–
Top score	–
Balls bowled	104
Wickets	2
Bowling average	25.50
5 wickets in innings	–
10 wickets in match	–
Best bowling	2/51
Catches/stumpings	–/–
- Source: Cricinfo, 12 December 2011

Arthur John Sharood (9 August 1856 – 31 March 1895) was an English cricketer. Sharood was a right-handed batsman who bowled right-arm fast-medium. He was born at Hurstpierpoint, Sussex, and was educated at Hurstpierpoint College.

Sharood made a single first-class appearance for Sussex against Surrey at the County Ground, Hove, in 1879. He took two wickets, both in Surrey's first-innings, dismissing John Shuter and Leonard Shuter and finishing with figures of 2/51 from 26 overs. The match ended in a draw. This was his only major appearance for Sussex.

He died at Axim in the British Gold Coast on 31 March 1895.
