= Michael Earls-Davis =

English cricketer

Personal information
- Full name: Michael Richard Gratwicke Earls-Davis
- Born: 21 February 1921; Hampstead, Middlesex, England
- Died: 5 April 2016 (aged 95); Sherborne, Dorset, England
- Batting: Left-handed
- Bowling: Right-arm fast-medium

Domestic team information
- Years: Team
- 1947: Cambridge University
- 1950: Somerset

Career statistics
Competition	FC
Matches	6
Runs scored	14
Batting average	2.33
100s/50s	0/0
Top score	4
Balls bowled	973
Wickets	12
Bowling average	30.08
5 wickets in innings	0
10 wickets in match	0
Best bowling	4/87
Catches/stumpings	2/–
- Source: CricketArchive, 22 December 2015

Michael Richard Gratwicke Earls-Davis (21 February 1921 − 5 April 2016) was an English cricketer who played for Cambridge University in 1947 and for Somerset in 1950. He was born at Hampstead, London.

== Biography ==
Educated at Sherborne School, Earls-Davis went up to Cambridge University but, like many students of his time, then joined the armed forces during World War II. He was an officer in the Irish Guards and was wounded in action in 1944. He was thus 26 by the time he started his first-class cricket career as a lower-order left-handed batsman and a right-arm fast-medium bowler at Cambridge in 1947. In his first game, against Worcestershire, he took five wickets in the match, including Don Kenyon twice. In the following match against Gloucestershire, he took four wickets for 87 in the county's first innings, and these proved to be the best bowling figures of his career. But he did not maintain this form and dropped out of the team before the University Match, and therefore did not win a Blue.

In wartime non-first-class matches, Earls-Davis had played for Sussex and he appeared in a second eleven match in 1947, scoring 58 as a middle-order batsman. But by 1949 he was playing non-first-class matches for Somerset and in 1950, when the Somerset captaincy was a matter for discussion following the resignation of the 1949 captain, George Woodhouse, Earls-Davis was one of several amateurs mentioned as potentially available. In the event, he played only once, making four runs and bowling five wicket-less overs on a spinners' wicket at Worcester.

== Outside cricket ==
Earls-Davis returned to Sherborne School as a teacher. He married in 1958 and had two sons and a daughter. He died on 5 April 2016.
