= Hurstpierpoint College =

Public school in Hurstpierpoint, West Sussex, England

Coordinates: 50°56′35″N 0°09′54″W

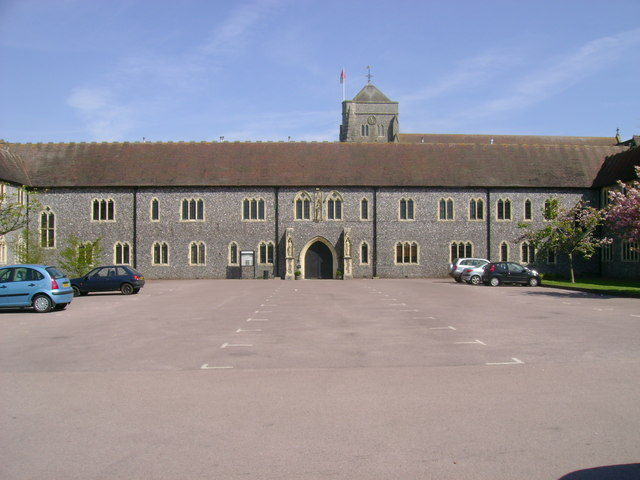

Location
- College Lane; Hurstpierpoint, West Sussex, BN6 9JS; England

Information
- Type: Public School; Independent School
- Motto: Latin: "Beati Mundo Corde" (Blessed are the pure in heart)
- Religious affiliation: Church of England
- Established: 1849; 177 years ago
- Founder: Canon Nathaniel Woodard
- Local authority: West Sussex
- Chair of Governors: Karen Mack
- Principal: Dominic Mott
- Gender: Mixed
- Age: 4 to 18
- Enrolment: c.1,337
- Houses: 13
- Colours: Red and White
- Alumni: Old Johnians
- Affiliation: Woodard Corporation
- Website: http://www.hppc.co.uk/

Hurstpierpoint College is a public school (British private boarding and day school), located just north of the village of Hurstpierpoint, West Sussex. The College was founded in 1849 by Canon Nathaniel Woodard and is a member of the Woodard Corporation.

== History ==
The school was established in 1849 as St John's Middle School, based in Shoreham. Its first headmaster, Edward Clarke Lowe, had worked with Woodard at Lancing College and stayed at Hurstpierpoint for 22 years until 1872. The school moved to Mansion House in Hurstpierpoint and then, thanks to the local benefactors the Campion family, on 21 June 1853 made its move to the present site. Intended to resemble the collegiate system at Oxford and Cambridge, Nathaniel Woodard designed the College to have adjoining Inner and Outer quads and the chapel and dining hall adjacent to each other.

In 1993 the College ceased to be a boys' school and accepted girls for the first time.

In 1996 the school chaplain and a science teacher were dismissed "after being cautioned by police for possessing child pornography" as reported by The Independent.

In 1997, for the 150th anniversary, Peter King published a book called "Hurstpierpoint College 1849-1995: The School by the Downs" where he gathered the history of the college.

In 2001-2002, it was reported that the College awarded a pupil an out-of-court settlement over claims poor teaching according to The Argus, The Times and The Guardian.

The school was inspected by the Independent Schools Inspectorate in 2019 and in January 2024.

In 2021, the College participated in the Queer Student Awards with an entry of the LGBTQ+ student, staff and allies to celebrate LGBTQ+ Pride.. The entry was based on the 2021 Pride History Month campaign and featured talks from Dr Sophie Cook, Jude Guaitamacchi and Sarah Jones.

In 2021, it was revealed that a Hurstpierpoint College teacher was jailed for 2 years for sexual offences against a female student as reported by The Argus and Leigh Day. The incident had happened around seven years earlier when the teacher abused "a position of trust to incite a girl who was under 18 to engage in sexual activity with him".

In 2024 the College celebrated its 175th anniversary and celebrated with Conmemorative Services, Reunions, and a walk to Wolstonbury Hill.

In May 2025, BBC News and The Argus revealed that two men had been arrested as part of an investigation into historic sexual abuse at a Hurstpierpoint College. One man was held on "suspicion of buggery of a boy under 16 years of age" and another man was arrested "on suspicion of possession of an indecent photograph of a child". The events happened in 1988 and 1990 respectively. BBC released this also as part of a Crime Watch programme.

In December 2025, The Telegraph reported that a number of schools, which included Hurstpierpoint College, were "supporting trans ideology behind parents’ backs".

In March 2026, the college celebrated 30 year of Co-Education with an event at the House of Commons, hosted by Mims Davies MP. Some of the speakers at the evening were Gill Robertson, one of Hurst's first ever girls and Hurst's first ever female school prefect, Natasha Kaplinsky, broadcaster and journalist, Katherine Molony, Hurst alumna and founder of Elevate(her), Kate Jillings, Entrepreneur and Co‑Founder of ToucanTech, Phoebe Perry, Hurst alumna and composer, Sadiq Bhatti MP, Shadow Minister for Education.

== Houses ==
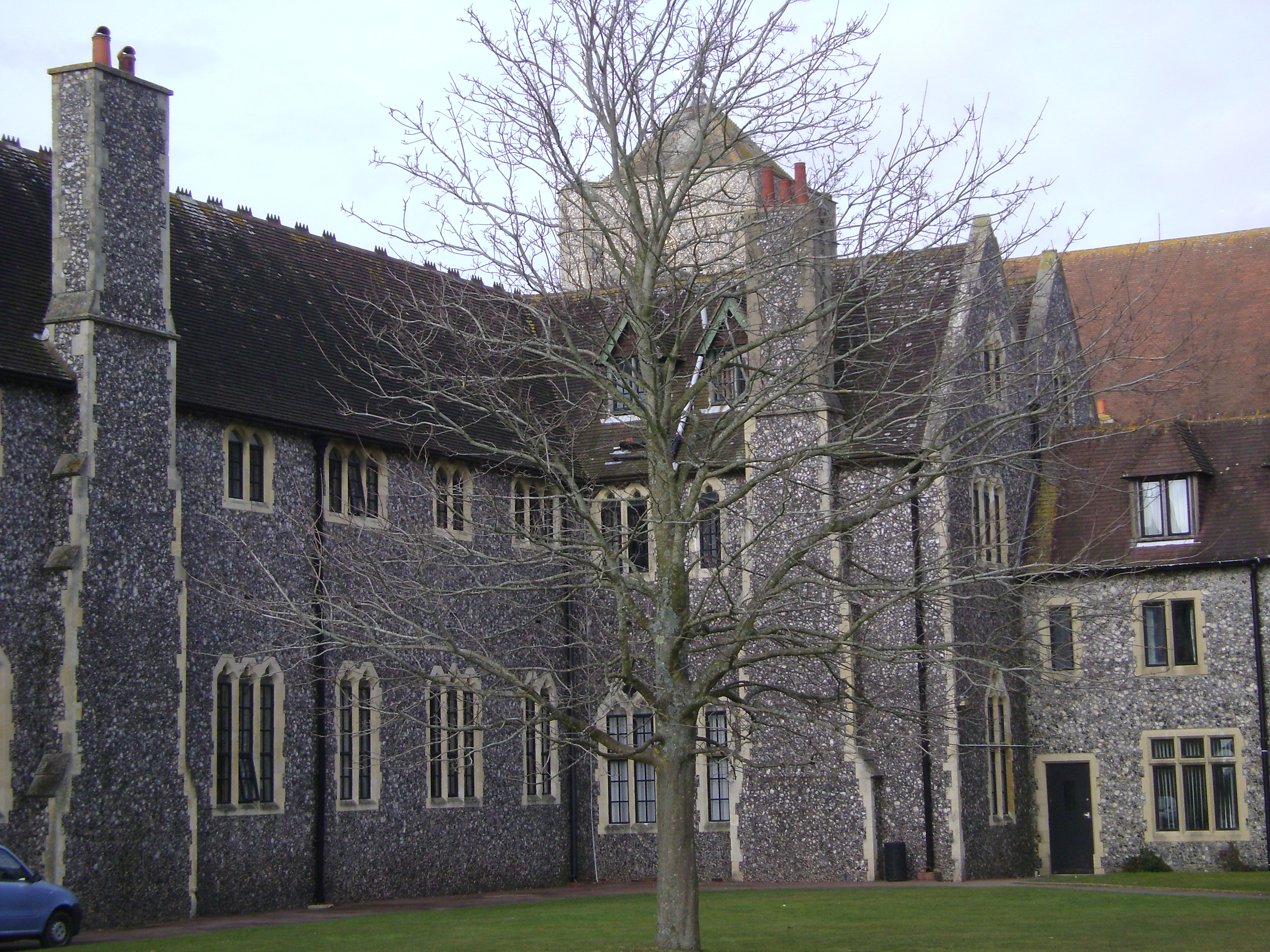
Close set flint walls

In the early 70s, the senior school comprised just seven houses, named: Eagle, Martlet, Shield, Red Cross, Chevron, Fleur de Lys and Star. Each house had a housemaster and house tutor who were also teachers within the school.

Since then, the number of senior school houses has grown in size alongside the school's expansion. It now consists of 13 houses. 6 boys' houses (Star, Chevron, Crescent, Eagle, Red Cross and Woodard) and 6 girls' houses (Fleur de Lys, Wolf, Phoenix, Shield, Martlet and Pelican), with the 13th house being the co-educational day and boarding 'hall of residence', St John's House - which all students in their last year (Upper Sixth) join, whilst retaining affiliation to their former houses.

== Traditions ==
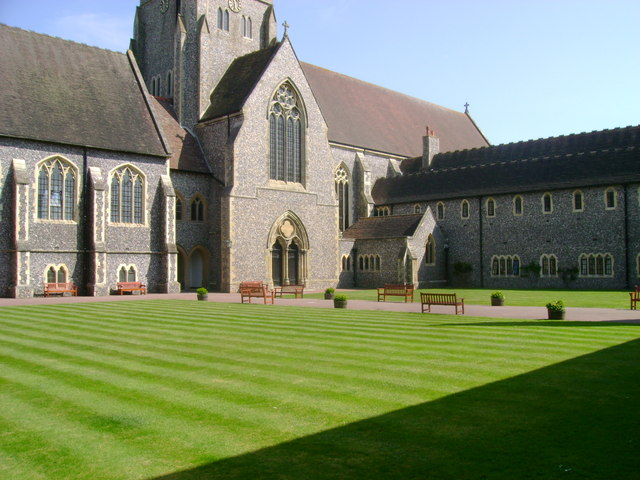
Inner quad

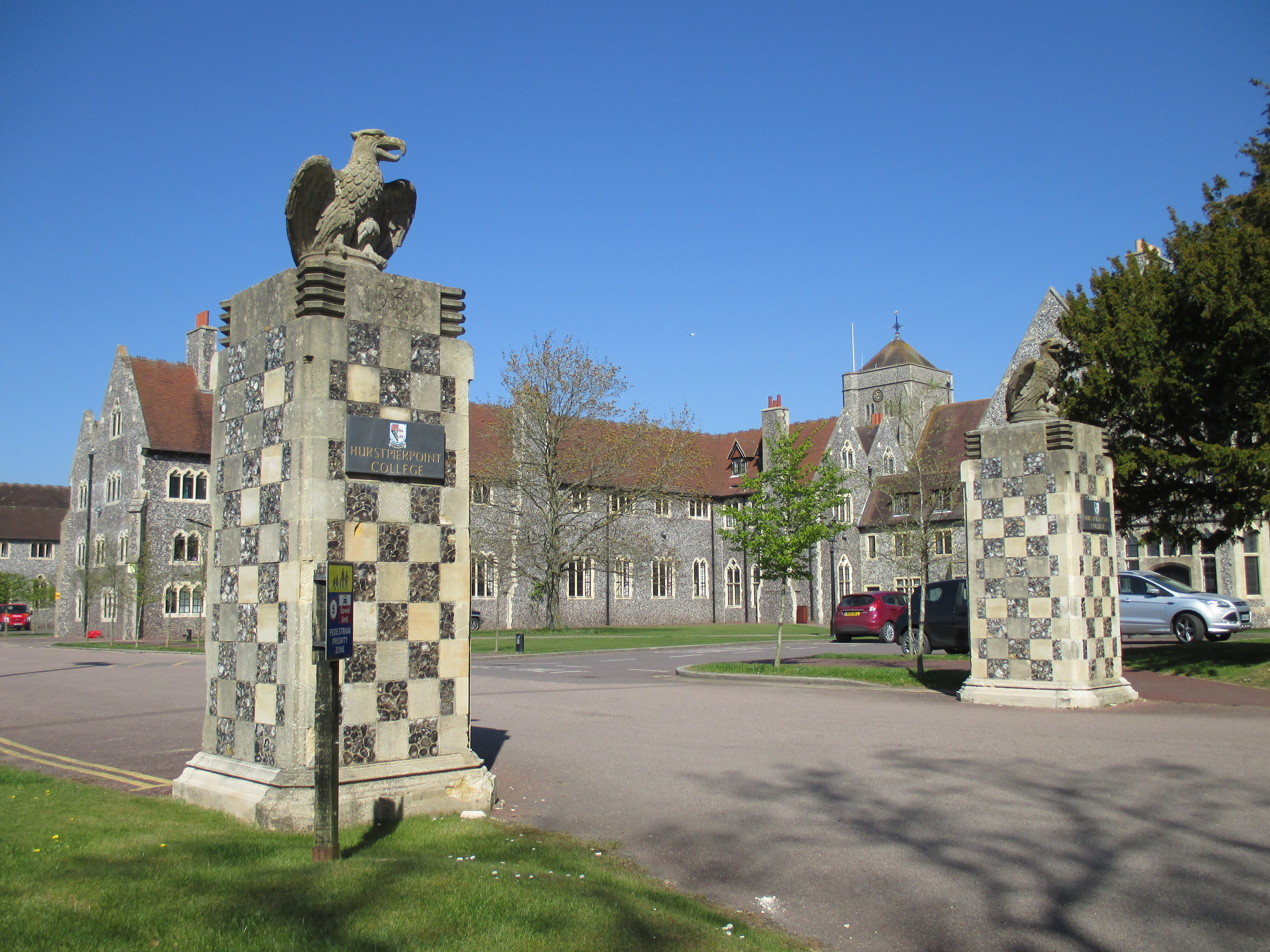
College Lane entrance

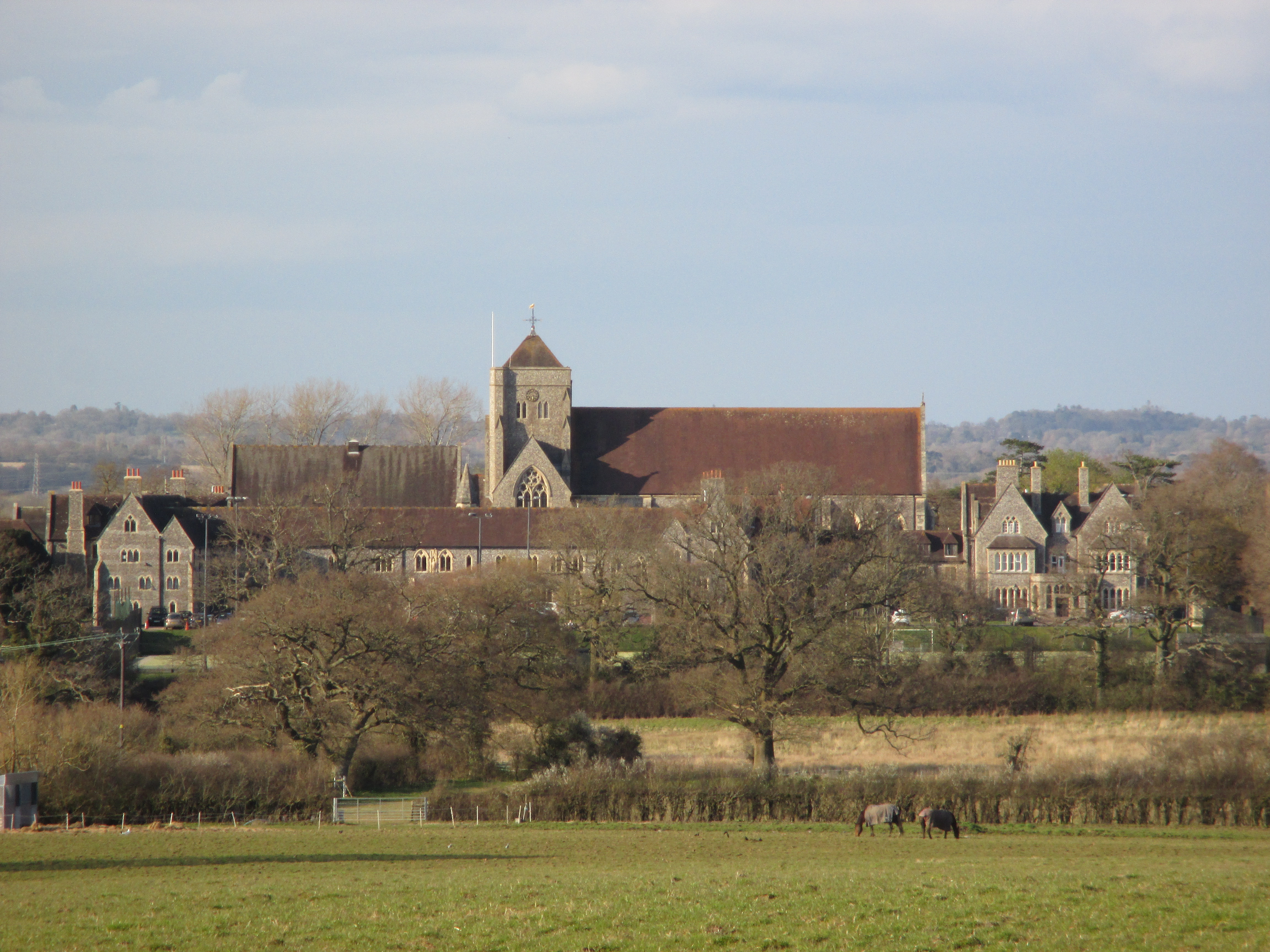
The college as viewed from the south

The school preserves ceremonies, such as the 'Boar's Head Procession' and the 'Wolstonbury Service' which for the most part were taken from other schools such as Winchester College, in order to give the school a feeling of tradition back in its early Victorian days.

"Hurst" has performed a Shakespeare play every year since 1854, beginning with Richard III after the first headmaster, Dr Lowe inspired the first players onto stage. Hurstpierpoint College boasts the oldest Shakespeare society in existence, older even than that of the Royal Shakespeare Company which was not formed until 1875.

The Hurst Johnian, the school magazine, founded in May 1858 is a source for the School's history. Its policy has been to maintain the annals of the school, and it continues to publish current reports and articles on the past. Evidence from the national archives suggests that it is the oldest school magazine in the country.

== Notable Masters ==
- Sabine Baring-Gould: Novelist and composer of hymns, the most notable being "Onward, Christian Soldiers". He was a Master of the College from 1855 to 1864. Baring-Gould had an eccentric reputation, and archives tell how he would teach with a bat on his shoulder and took weird holidays, bringing home a pony from Iceland, which lived for years in the North Field. Whilst the Hymn is thought to have been written in Yorkshire in 1865, a story recounts how Baring-Gould (known as "Snout") on one occasion gave a pupil of the College thirty-six (sic) cuts, and then washed his hands and sat down and wrote "Onward Christian Soldiers." A talented artist, he made and painted (well heraldically) the coat of arms of the Prince of Wales, which for many years appeared in the proscenium. Baring-Gould designed the cover of the Johnian (the College's publication), and designed the bookshelves and cases with their wrought iron, originally red and gold, in the Boys' Library. He also painted the window jambs with scenes from the "Canterbury Tales" and the "Faery Queen", and probably did work for the Fellows' Library. In 1860 he was one of the "Hurst Rifle Volunteers," who used to drill at the New Inn, which lead Hurst to be one of the founding Combined Cadet Forces schools.
- Thomas Fielden: He was a famous Director of Music at Hurst, Charterhouse and Fettes, as well as a noted pianist, and Professor of Pianoforte at the Royal College of Music for over 30 years.
- Percy Henn: Noted clergyman and teacher in England and later Western Australia.

== Notable alumni ==
Past students of Hurstpierpoint College are referred to as 'Old Johnians'.

== Headmasters ==
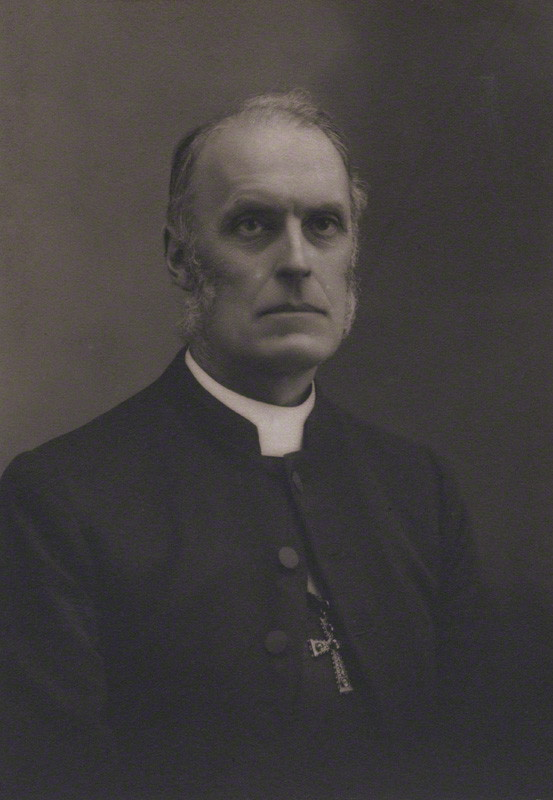
William Awdry was headmaster from 1873 to 1879

- Edward Clarke Lowe (1849–1872)
- William Awdry (1873–1879)
- Charles Cooper (1880–1902)
- Arthur Coombes (1902–1923)
- Henry Bernard Tower (1924–1937)
- Walter Dingwall (1937–1945)
- Ronald Howard (1945–1964)
- Roger Griffiths (1964–1986)
- Simon Watson (1986–1995)
- Stephen Meek (1995–2004)
- Tim Manly (2005–2023)
- Dominic Mott (2023–present)

== Southern Railway Schools Class ==
The school lent its name to the nineteenth steam locomotive (Engine 918) in the Southern Railway's Class V of which there were 40. This Class was also known as the Schools Class because all 40 of the class were named after prominent English Public Schools. 'Hurstpierpoint', as it was called, was built in 1934 and was withdrawn in 1961. Its nameplate is now housed in the school's science block.

== Coat of arms ==
Coat of arms of Hurstpierpoint College
Notes Granted 1 June 1931. Escutcheon Per pale Argent and Ermine, dexter on a bend cottised Sable a cross couped between two martlets of the first, on a chief Gules an eagle, round the head a crown of glory, Or, sinister two wolves passant counterpassant also Gules; all within a bordure engrailed Azure. Motto 'Beati mundo corde'
