= Abbots Bromley Horn Dance =

English folk dance

The dance, above Blithfield Reservoir in 2026

The Abbots Bromley Horn Dance is a folk dance which takes place each September in the village of Abbots Bromley in Staffordshire, England. It is performed by ten dancers, accompanied by a musician playing an accordion and a youth with a triangle. Six of the dancers carry reindeer horns; the remaining four take the roles of a hobby horse, Maid Marian, a fool, and a youth with a bow and arrow. On Wakes Monday the performers dance around the parish all day, beginning early in the morning at the parish church where the horns are stored.

The origin of the dance is unknown. The earliest written record of a hobby-horse performance at Abbots Bromley dates to 1532, and the first mention of the reindeer horns is from 1686. Radiocarbon dating has shown that at least one of the horns dates to the eleventh century, though it is unknown how or when they came to Staffordshire or became associated with the dance. Many explanations of the meaning of the dance have been proposed, and it is commonly interpreted as a pagan ritual, but there is no evidence for any of them.

Since Cecil Sharp published the dance in The Sword Dances of Northern England, it has been performed outside Abbots Bromley both by the Abbots Bromley dancers themselves and members of the English Folk Dance and Song Society. It has been depicted in both visual and performance art, and featured in exhibitions about British folk traditions.

== History ==
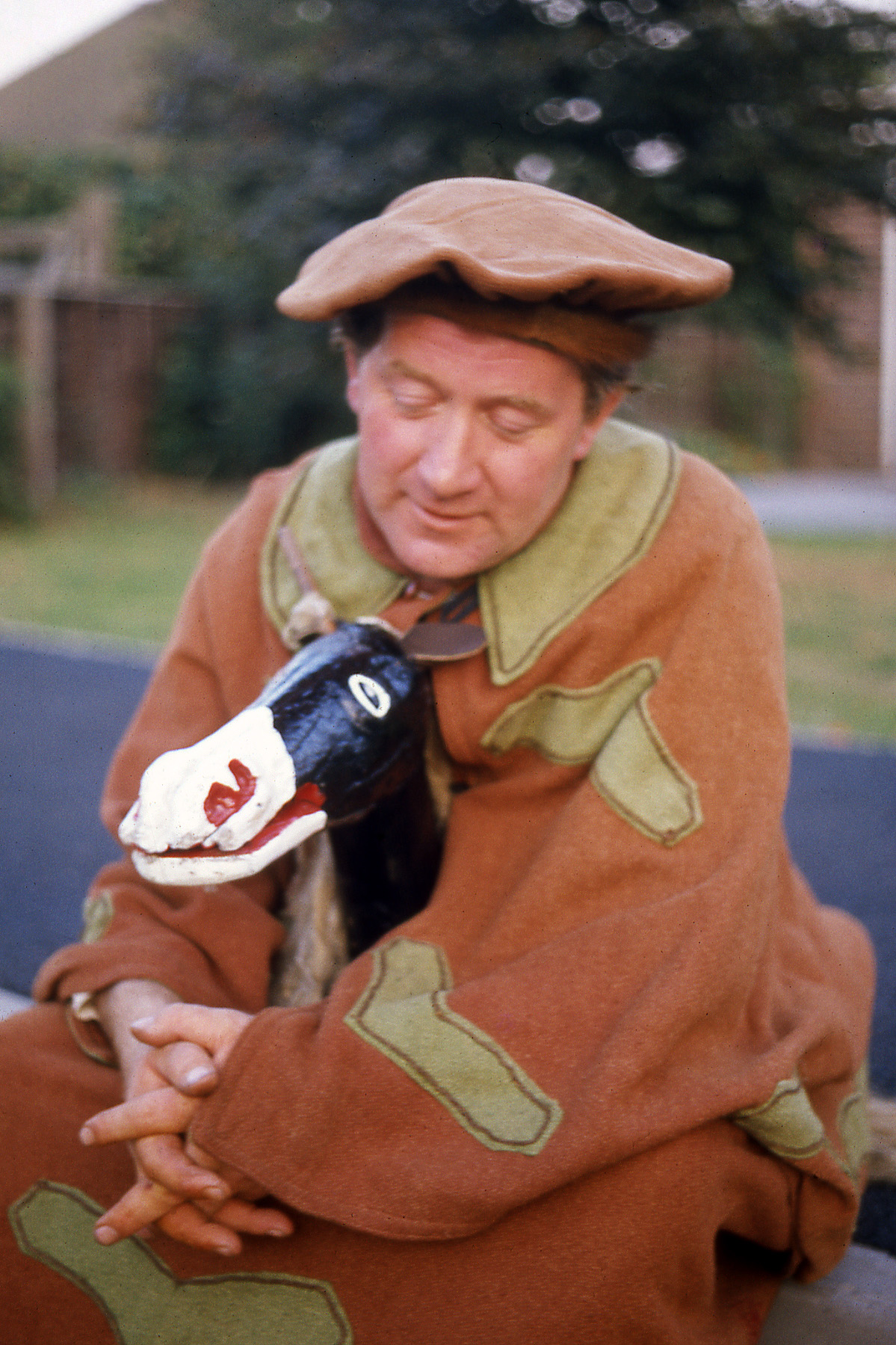
The hobby horse, photographed in the mid-1970s. It has since been replaced by a more realistic carving.

The earliest written mention of the Abbots Bromley Horn Dance is in Robert Plot's Natural History of Staffordshire, published in 1686. Plot does not seem to have seen the dance himself, but gives a detailed description of the custom. According to an annotation by Sir Simon Degge in his copy of Plot's book, he had seen the dance being performed before the English Civil War (1642–1651). An earlier mention of the hobby horse at Abbots Bromley from 1532 describes it as an ancient custom, but does not mention the horns. In 1976, one of the reindeer horns was radiocarbon dated to 1065 ± 80 years. It is unknown when the horns were brought to Abbots Bromley and when they began to be used in the dance. Though many sources claim that the dance was first performed at the St Bartholomew's Day fair in 1226, there is no evidence for this supposition.

Many explanations for the origin of the dance have been proposed, though there is no concrete evidence for any of them. According to E. C. Cawte, it "differs in so many ways from the other ritual dances in this country that it is difficult to understand how it developed its present form". It has often been interpreted as the remnant of a pagan ritual. Violet Alford believed that the dance was originally a winter solstice fertility rite. Alternatively it has been suggested that it originally was connected to hunting, either as a ritual to encourage or celebrate a successful hunt, or to celebrate the villagers' hunting rights. Parallels have been drawn to the prehistoric deer skull headdresses from Star Carr in Yorkshire, or the "Sorcerer" cave-painting from Trois-Frères in southern France, (Note: The Star Carr frontlets are from the Mesolithic period, and have been dated to the 10th millennium Before Present; the "Sorcerer" cave painting is Paleolithic, dating to about 13,000 BC.) as well as references in William Shakespeare's As You Like It to a deer-hunter being awarded the deer's "leather skin and horns to wear", and in Anthony Munday's The Death of Robert Earl of Huntingdon to Friar Tuck "carrying a stag's head dauncing", both from the end of the sixteenth century.

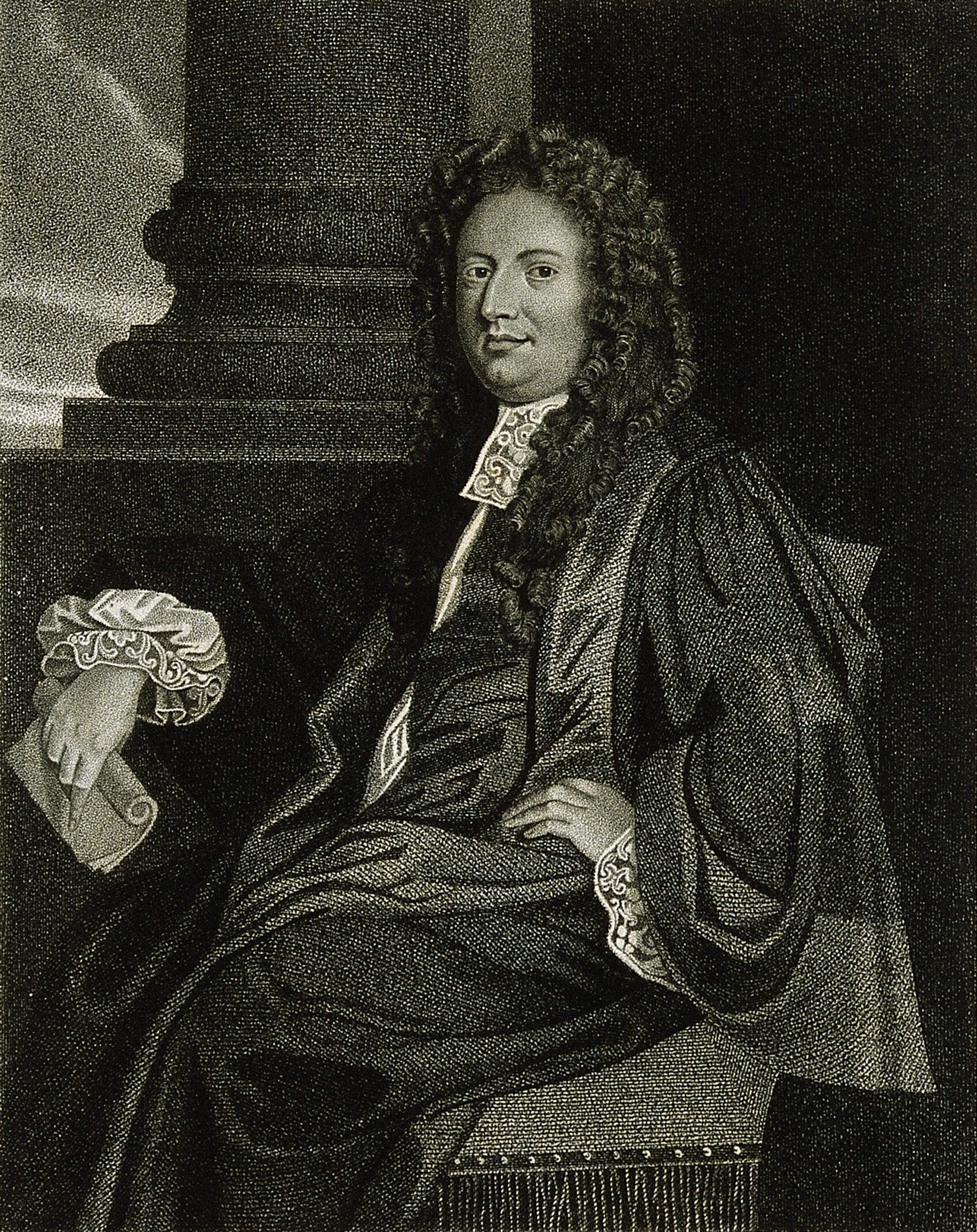
Robert Plot, who made the first written record of the Abbots Bromley Horn Dance. Portrait by Sylvester Harding, 1802.

In the seventeenth century, the dance was performed in the Christmas period – according to Robert Plot, "on New Year, and Twelfth-day" – but it now takes place on the Monday following the first Sunday after September 4. Plot reports that the dancers collected money for church repairs and to support the parish poor. In the Tudor period, the use of hobby horses to raise money for the parish at Christmas time seems to have been widespread in the north Midlands. Along with Abbots Bromley, it is attested at Stafford and at Culworth in Northamptonshire; a hobby-horse performance at Holme Pierrepont in Nottinghamshire also probably took place in the winter.

The horn dance apparently stopped being performed around the time of the English Civil War, before being re-established in the eighteenth century. The Staffordshire antiquarian Richard Wilkes described the dance in his history of the county, suggesting that the tradition had been re-established; his information probably came from around 1725, when he married a woman from Abbots Bromley. By the late-19th century, the date of the dance had moved to September; Ronald Hutton argues that this change of date probably happened at the time of the re-establishment of the tradition. Unlike many similar customs, which died out and were revived in the twentieth century, the horn dance has been practiced continuously since the eighteenth century. According to local tradition, the dance has been led by the same family throughout this period.

== Event ==
=== Schedule ===
The horn dance performed outside Blithfield Hall, 7 September 2026.

The Horn Dance takes place on Wakes Monday, the day following the first Sunday after 4 September. It previously took place at the beginning of January, on New Year and Twelfth Night.

The dance starts at 8 a.m. at St Nicholas's Church in Abbots Bromley and travels around the parish before returning to the village at the end of the day. The first dance is outside the vicarage; the dancers subsequently perform in the marketplace and various houses and farms around the parish. About midday they dance at Blithfield Hall and have lunch there. Afterwards, the dancers return to the village, with the final dance around 8 p.m. In the Victorian period, the dancers went out for several days, visiting nearby towns and villages such as Colton and Rugeley.

=== Dancers ===
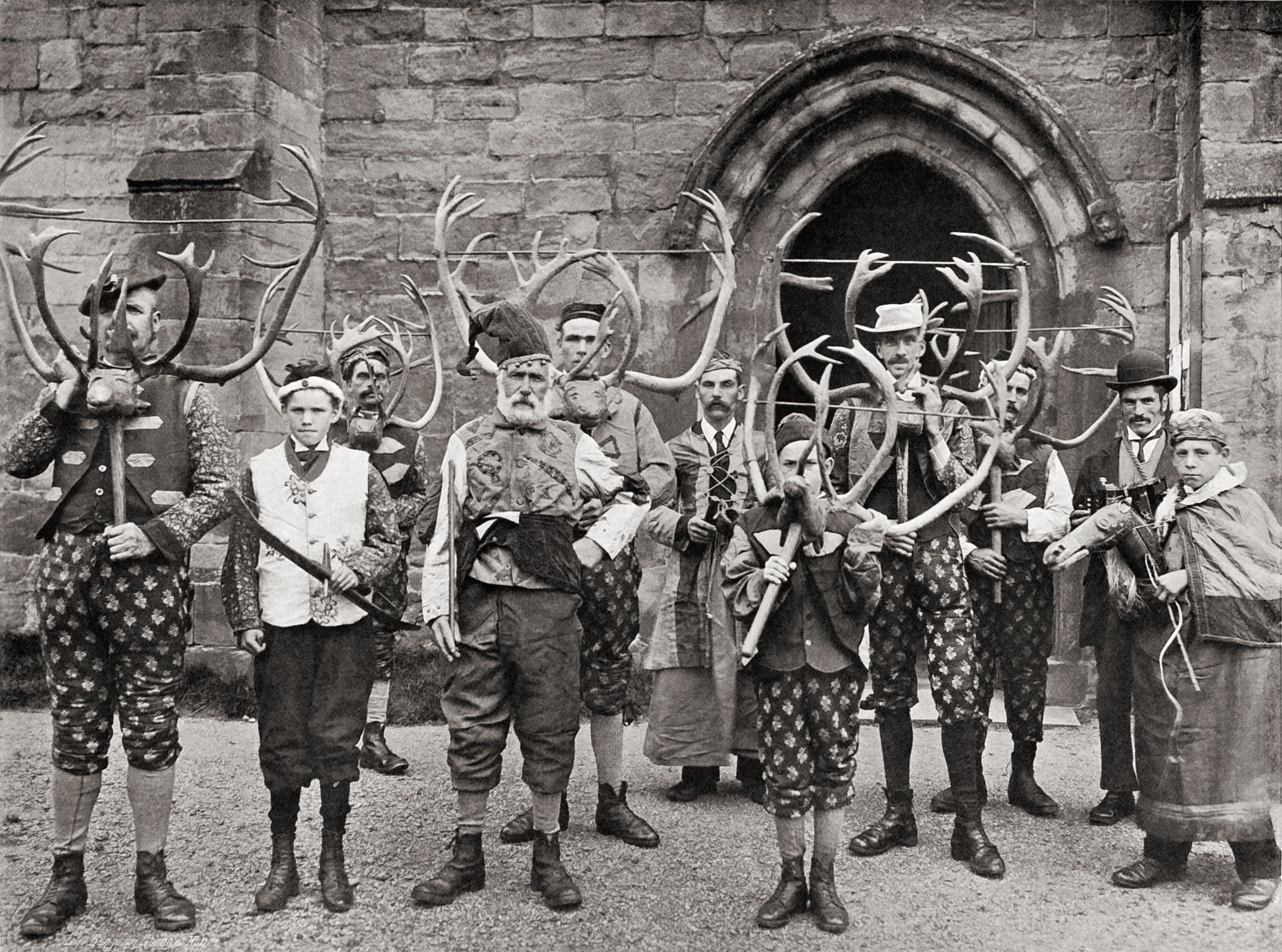
The dancers in 1899

Twelve people perform in the dance: six dancers carrying reindeer horns, a fool, Maid Marian (played by a man wearing women's clothes), (Note: The identification of the man dressed as a woman with Maid Marian seems to have first been made by E. de V. Bryans, then the vicar of Abbots Bromley, in 1893.) a hobby horse, a child with a bow and arrow, a musician, (Note: The music was reportedly played by a fiddler in the 1870s; from the 1880s the musician has played a concertina, accordion, or melodeon.) and a child with a triangle. Of these, the two musicians do not dance; their role is only to accompany the dancers. The dancers use the hobby horse's jaw and the bow and arrow as percussion instruments to keep time with the music. The Maid Marian carries a ladle used to collect money; the fool has a bladder on a stick.

Plot's account of the dance suggests there may have been only eight or nine performers in his day. He does not mention either the fool or the Maid Marian. The triangle player is a relatively recent addition to the side, only having been introduced at the beginning of the twentieth century; the remainder of the team seems not to have changed significantly at least since the beginning of the nineteenth century. According to Plot's account, in his day the dancer with the hobby horse also held the bow and arrow; Violet Alford doubts that it was possible for one person to do both. Wilkes mentions a sword in his description of the dance; though no other source records a sword at Abbots Bromley other morris teams included a sword in their regalia in the nineteenth century.

=== Costume ===
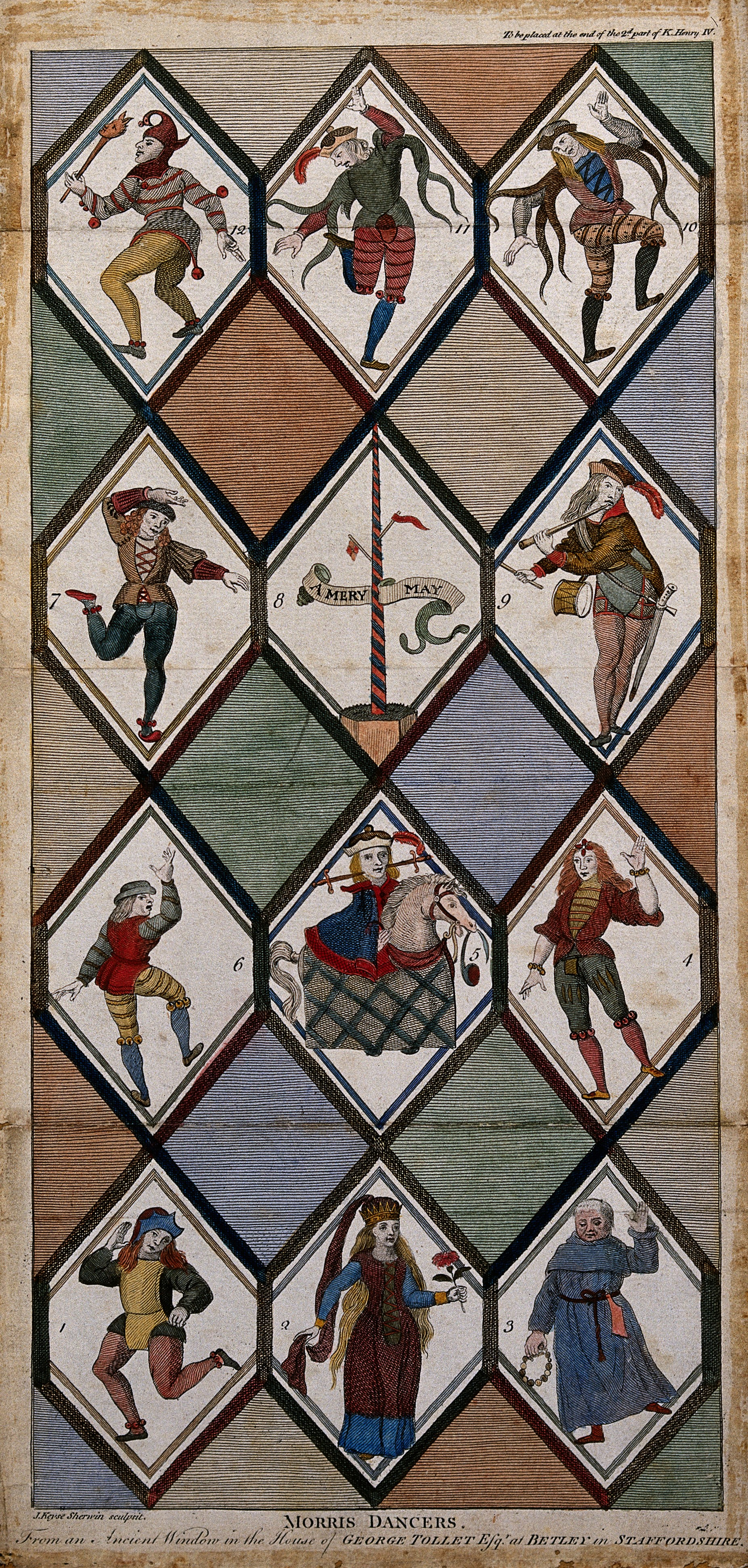
Engraving depicting the sixteenth-century Betley window, which may have been an inspiration for the horn dance costumes.

Until the 1880s, dancers wore their ordinary clothes decorated with ribbons. At that time, the vicar's wife designed costumes for the dancers in a mock-medieval style, originally made from old curtains and perhaps inspired by the sixteenth-century painted Betley window, or by illustrations in an edition of Shakespeare's plays; these costumes were replaced in 1904 and again in 1951.

The original costumes for the horn-carriers were green tunics and blue trousers, both with brown spots or flowers; the dancers now wear either green or red jackets, with green breeches with an oak leaf pattern. (Note: Though Cecil Sharp says that the replacement costumes made in 1904 were "more or less exact" copies of the originals, Marcia Rice quotes a Mrs. Simpson, one of the contributors to the 1904 replacement, as saying that the new costumes were merely "the same in general effect ... we followed our own fancy, and were not bothered by any antiquarian scruples".) In the 1880s the fool wore a furry cap; the 1904 version of the costume introduced jester's motley. The hobby horse is of the tourney style, in which a horse's head and tail are fixed to the performer's body by a frame, which is then covered by a cloth, giving the appearance of a person riding a horse. Plot's description of the horse, as being made of thin boards carried between the dancer's legs, is more like a stick horse; he does not seem to have actually seen the performance and this is probably an error.

=== Antlers ===
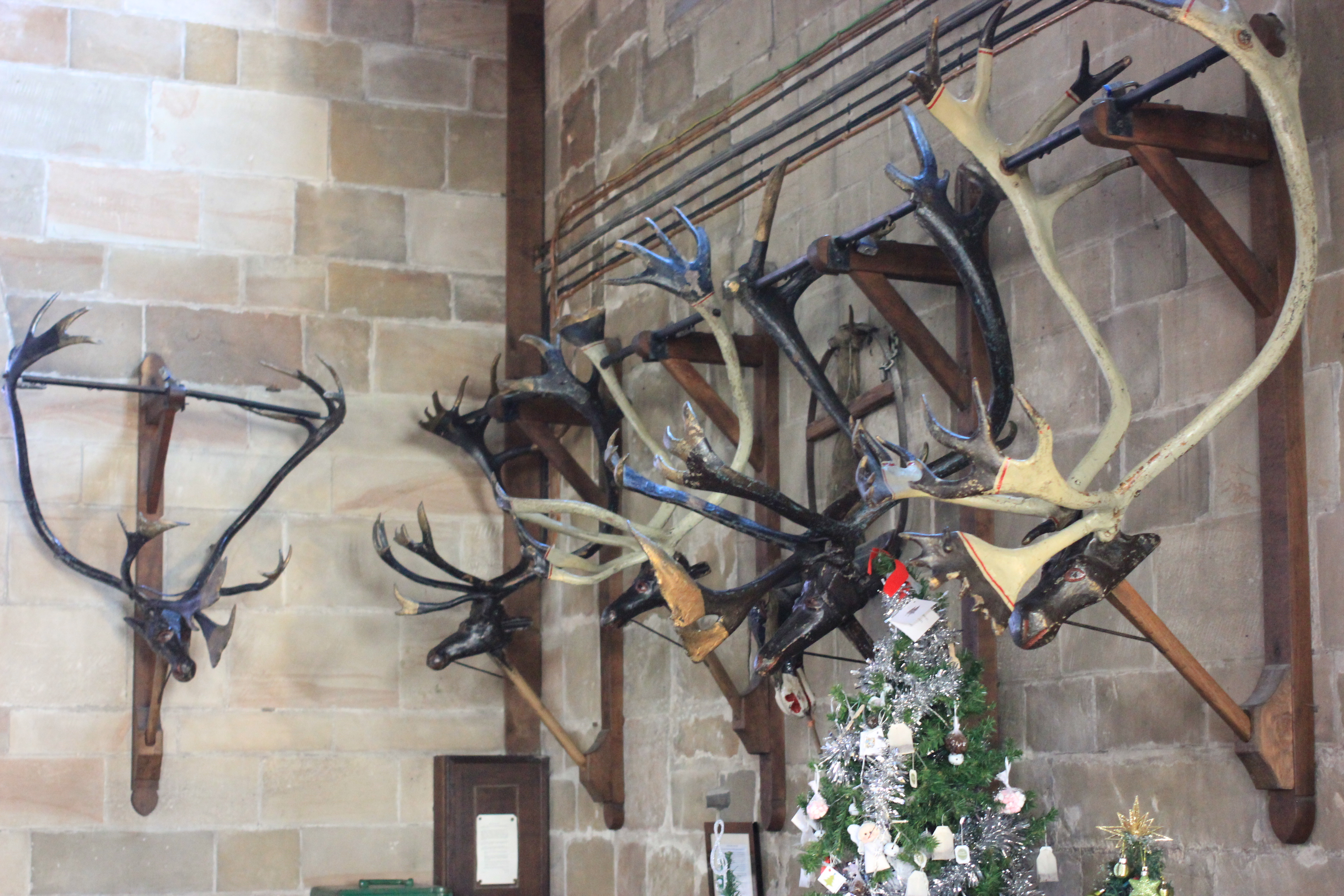
The antlers used in the dance, stored in the parish church

The antlers used in the dance are from reindeer, and date to the 11th century. As there were no reindeer in Britain at this point, they must have been imported, most likely from Scandinavia. The largest measures 101 cm (40 in) across and weighs 25.5 lb (11.6 kg); the smallest measures 77 cm (30 in) across and the lightest weighs 16.25 lb (7.37 kg). Three of the sets of antlers are painted white with brown tips and three are painted brown with gold tips; historically the brown antlers have instead been painted blue and red at different times. In the 17th century they had the coats of arms of important local families painted on them, but these are no longer visible. The antlers are set into wooden heads, thought to date from the 16th century, which are mounted on wooden poles. The heads are painted brown with features drawn on in red and black.

Historical accounts of the Abbots Bromley dance are inconsistent in their descriptions of the horns. Plot says that the horns were from reindeer; Wilkes says that they were elk. Wilkes says that they weighed 56 lb (25 kg); Cecil Sharp says that the heaviest was 90 lb (41 kg). Wilkes claimed that the horns were brought to Abbots Bromley by William Paget, the ambassador to the Ottoman Empire. However, Paget's return from Turkey postdates the accounts of Plot and Degge which mention the horns. Possibly Paget brought a set of horns back to Abbots Bromley when he returned from Turkey because horns were already used in the dance, and these later fell out of use as less practical than the original ones.

Wilkes also reports that the antlers were stored in Abbots Bromley town hall. In 1820 Thomas Harwood was the first to report that they were stored in the church. In the late nineteenth century they were kept in the church tower; in 1927 they were moved and subsequently have been stored in the Hurst Chapel.

According to tradition, the horns must not leave the parish. A different set of horns, acquired in the 1950s, is used for performances outside Abbots Bromley. One set of horns was apparently lost early in the 19th century; Marcia Rice reports a story that the Abbots Bromley dancers were bribed to bring the horns to Burton-upon-Trent, got drunk, and had the horns stolen.

=== Dance ===
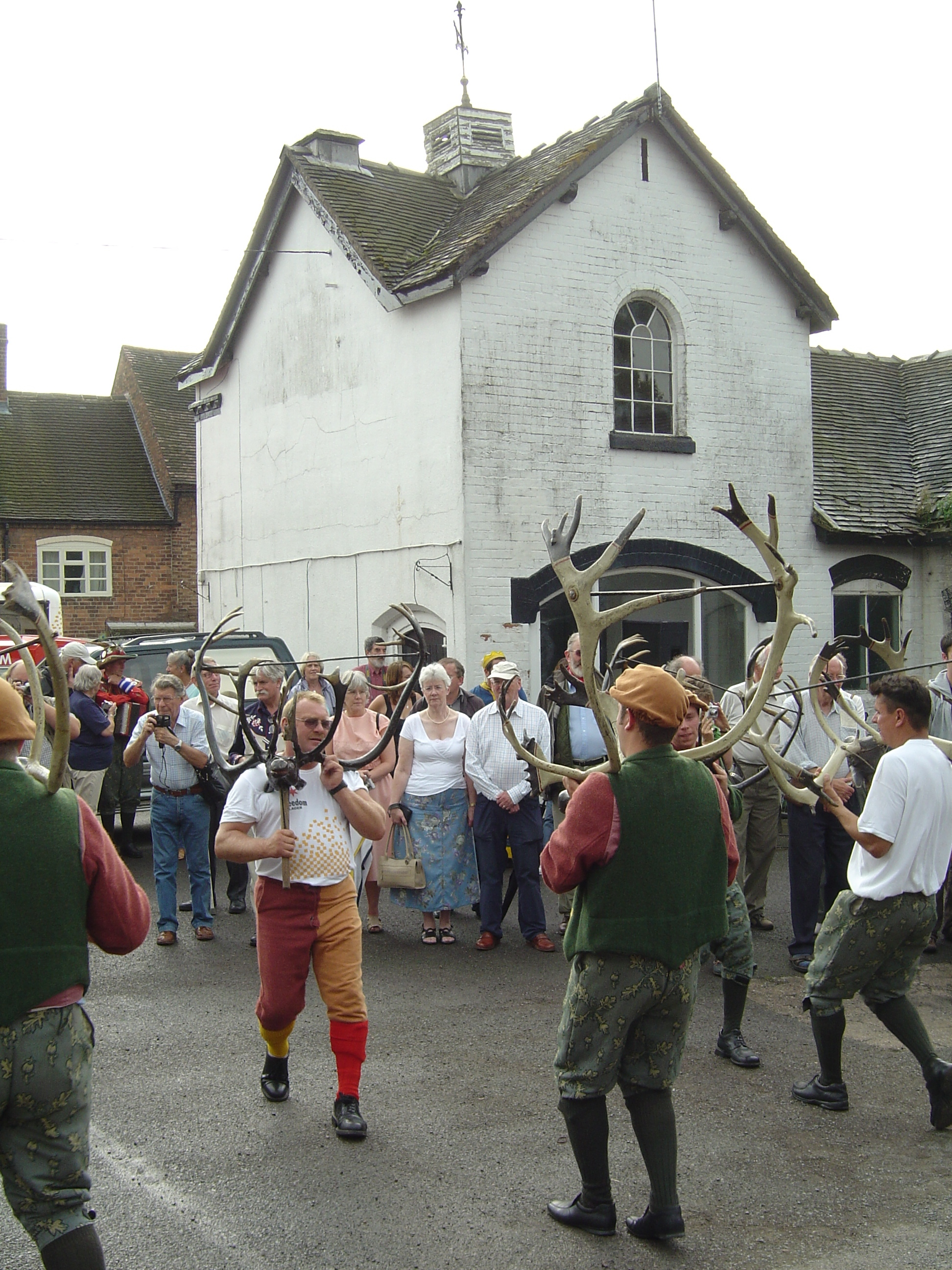
The Horn Dance outside the Bagot Arms on 11 September 2006

In 1911, Cecil Sharp described the dance as being made up of two main figures. In the first, the dancers process around in a circle before turning and circling back. In the second, the dancers face off in two rows, dancing together and apart before crossing over, turning around, and repeating the process to return to their original place. It is performed without any special footwork: Alford describes the dance as a "steady rhythmical plod".

There is no specific tune associated with the dance. In 1893, the vicar of Abbots Bromley recalled that there had previously been a special tune for the dance but that it had been lost. In 1912, Sharp published a tune sent to him by a J. Buckley which Buckley said he had collected in the 1850s from a fiddler from Abbots Bromley. According to Andrew Bullen, "this is the tune most often associated with the horn dance and it is probably the oldest"; however, there is some dispute as to whether the tune did in fact accompany the dance. E. C. Cawte questions its authenticity, partly on stylistic grounds – "it is not in the character of tunes for other traditional dances" – and partly because the reputed source of the tune had never been the musician for the dance.

Other tunes associated with the dance have been collected from William Adey, a dancer who in 1924 recalled a tune which he remembered being used in the 1870s and 1880s, and Edie Sammons, whose brother played for the dance. When Sharp collected the dance, "any country-dance air" was used; he saw it performed to Yankee Doodle. More recently modern tunes have also been played.

== In culture ==
Shortly after Sharp recorded the Abbots Bromley horn dance in Sword Dances of Northern England, versions of it began to be performed outside of the village by members of the English Folk Dance Society (now the English Folk Dance and Song Society or EFDSS). The dance was brought to America in the 1920s, initially by Sharp's student May Gadd, and Frank Smith, the founder of the Berea College Country Dancers. Since 1947, a version of the dance has been performed by Thaxted Morris Men at the Thaxted meetings of the Morris Ring. In 1951 they also performed the dance to celebrate the Festival of Britain. In 1966 the Abbots Bromley dancers performed at the Royal Albert Hall as part of EFDSS's annual festival; they also performed at Dancing England four times between 1979 and 2019. By 1993, 24 American morris sides listed the Abbots Bromley horn dance as one they performed in the annual American Morris Newsletter directory.

Ivon Hitchens' Mural, in the Kennedy Hall of Cecil Sharp House, the headquarters of the English Folk Dance and Song Society, depicts English folk-dances and traditions. The horn dancers shown on the right of the mural are probably based on those at Abbots Bromley. Replicas of the horns, presented to EFDSS in 1930, are also kept at Cecil Sharp House. A series of pencil drawings by Dave Pearson, In the Seven Woods, also depict the Abbots Bromley dance. In 2019, Royal Mail issued a set of stamps depicting unusual British customs and festivals which included the Abbots Bromley horn dance. The dance was one of three traditional dances which inspired Hanna Tuulikki's "Deer Dancer". The artist and folk performer Lucy Wright's performance piece, "Non-Fertility Ritual", is a response to the interpretation of the Abbots Bromley dance as a fertility ritual.

The dance has been featured in exhibitions including Mummers, Maypoles, and Milkmaids: A Journey Through the English Ritual Year at the Horniman Museum in 2012, and Making Michief: Folk Costume in Britain at Compton Verney Art Gallery in 2023.

== Works cited ==
- Alford, Violet (1933). "The Abbots Bromley Horn Dance". Antiquity. 7 (26): 203–209. doi:10.1017/S0003598X00007948.
- Bayless, Martha (2017). "The Fuller Brooch and Anglo-Saxon Depictions of Dance". Anglo-Saxon England. 45: 183–212. doi:10.1017/S0263675100080261. JSTOR 26332316.
- Buckland, Theresa (1980). "The Reindeer Antlers of the Abbots Bromley Horn Dance: A Re-examination" (PDF). Lore and Language. 3 (2A): 1–8.
- Buckland, Theresa (2001). "Dance, Authenticity and Cultural Memory: The Politics of Embodiment". Yearbook for Traditional Music. 33: 1–16. doi:10.2307/1519626. JSTOR 1519626.
- Bullen, Andrew (1987). "The Abbots Bromley Horn Dance" (PDF). Country Dance & Song. 17: 2–15.
- Cawte, E. C. (1978). Ritual Animal Disguise: A Historical and Geographical Study of Animal Disguise in the British Isles. Cambridge and Totowa: D.S. Brewer Ltd. and Rowman and Littlefield for the Folklore Society. ISBN 978-0-85991-028-6.
- Conneller, Chantal (2004). "Becoming deer. Corporeal transformations at Star Carr". Archaeological Dialogues. 11: 37–56. doi:10.1017/S1380203804001357.
- Forbes, Rhomylly B. (1996). Links in a Thousand-Year-Old Chain: The Abbots Bromley Horn Dance in America. Baldwin, Kansas: Old Castle.
- Frost, James (2023). Animal Guising and the Kentish Hooden Horse. St-Nicholas-at-Wade: Ozaru Books. ISBN 9781915174062.
- Heaney, Michael (1987). "New Evidence for the Abbots Bromley Hobby-Horse". Folk Music Journal. 5 (3): 359–360. JSTOR 4522242.
- Hutton, Ronald (1996). The Stations of the Sun: A History of the Ritual Year in England. Oxford University Press.
- Kennedy, Douglas N. (1939). "Review: Abbots Bromley by Marcia Rice". Journal of the English Folk Dance and Song Society. 3 (4): 281–283. JSTOR 4521160.
- Kightly, Charles (1986). The Customs and Ceremonies of Britain: An Encyclopedia of Living Traditions. Thames and Hudson.
- Lyon, Luke (1981). "Hobby-Horse Ceremonies in New Mexico and Great Britain". Folk Music Journal. 4 (2): 117–145. JSTOR 4522083.
- Maryanski, Alexandra (2018). "The Origin of Religion: Recent Scientific Findings". In Petersen, Anders Klostergaard; Sælid, Gilhus Ingvild; Jensen, Jeppe Sinding; Sørensen, Jesper; Martin, Luther H. (eds.). Evolution, Cognition, and the History of Religion: A New Synthesis. Brill. ISBN 9789004385375.
- Matless, David (2024). England’s Green: Nature and Culture Since the 1960s. London: Reaktion Books. ISBN 9781789149210.
- Rice, Marcia (1939). Abbots Bromley. Shrewsbury: Wilding and Son.
- Roud, Stephen (2006). The English Year: A Month-by-Month Guide to the Nation's Customs and Festivals, from May Day to Mischief Night. Penguin.
- Sharp, Cecil J. (1911). The Sword Dances of Northern England, Together with the Horn Dance of Abbots Bromley. London: Novello & Co.
- Sharp, Cecil J. (1912). The Sword Dances of Northern England: Songs and Dance Airs, Book II. London: Novello and Co.
- Simons, Matthew (2019). Morris Men: Dancing Englishness, c. 1905–1951 (PDF) (Thesis). De Montfort University.
- Walters, Victoria (2025). "Who Should Wake Coyote? The Role of 'Exemplary Stories' in a Time of Climate Change". Anthropological Journal of European Cultures. 34 (1). doi:10.3167/ajec.2025.340106.
- White, Ethan Doyle (2012). "Mummers, Maypoles, and Milkmaids: A Journey Through the English Ritual Year". The Pomegranate. 14 (2). doi:10.1558/pome.v14i2.304.
