= Prehn =

Prehn is a surname. Notable people with the surname include:

- Anette Prehn (born 1975), Danish author and sociologist
- Fred Prehn (1860-1932), American harnessmaker and merchant
- Kelly England Prehn (born 1988), British model, editor, influencer, fashion ambassador, and businesswoman
- Paul Prehn (1892–1973), American wrestler
- Rasmus Prehn (born 1973), Danish politician
- Thomas Prehn (born 1961), American cyclist
