= Edward Clarke Lowe =

Edward Clarke Lowe (15 December 1823–30 March 1912) was an English educator and a key participant in the foundation and development of the Woodard Schools.

== Early life and education ==
Lowe was born in Everton Liverpool, in 1823, the youngest son of Samuel Lowe an attorney and his wife Maria Murray, and was given the name Clarke after an uncle John Clarke, Master of Rugeley Grammar School. His father died when he was four and his mother when he was ten and it was his eldest sister Eliza who looked after the family. She had been well educated by her uncle John Clarke and set up a very successful school in Bootle. Not only did she pay off the eldest brother's debts but she also funded the education of her younger brothers and sisters. She also educated them initially at her own school, and Edward Lowe was no exception. He was probably with the school when it moved to Seaforth. He then went to Magdalene Hall Oxford under Rev. William Jacobson. In June 1844 he was elected to the Bible Clerkship at Lincoln College, Oxford where he became a pupil of Mark Pattison. In 1847, he became second master of the King's School Ottery St. Mary. He was ordained deacon in September of the same year and also became curate of the parish.

== Woodard Schools ==
In 1849 he joined Rev Nathaniel Woodard at Shoreham as second master at St Nicholas College Lancing. Woodard had just begun his efforts to found, by public subscription, a system of Church of England education for the middle classes. In January 1850, Lowe became first headmaster at Hurstpierpoint College, the first middle school of the system, where he stayed until the end of 1872. He made a lasting impression, and the school still performs Shakespeare plays as he established them in 1854, and celebrates the "Lowe's Dole", an annual presentation to the choristers which he funded.

Lowe married Harriet Duke Coleridge of Ottery St Mary, Devon. Harriet's mother became mentally ill after giving birth to Harriet's much younger sister, Alice. Alice Mary Coleridge was brought up by Lowe and his wife and Alice played a major part in the setting up of Abbots Bromley School for Girls. Woodard thought his foundation would be wasting its efforts in promoting the education of women. Lowe, who owed so much to his well educated older sister Eliza, strongly disagreed. He believed that university education should be open to women and with his friends eventually prevailed upon Woodard to give his blessing and use his enormous fund-raising skills for the foundation of the School of St. Anne at Abbots Bromley in 1874. Eliza Lowe and the Founding of Woodard Schools for Girls, published by Lutterworth Press in 2021 argues that Woodard never agreed to the founding of S. Anne's and that Edward Lowe, together with supporters in the Midlands, was solely responsible for the founding of the school.

In 1873 Lowe became Provost of the Midland District of St Nicholas's College with a number of educational responsibilities. He was head of the Society of St Mary and John of Lichfield in union with St Nicholas' College, and directed the large schools at Denstone College and Ellesmere College for boys as well as the two Abbots Bromley schools for Girls – St Anne and later St Mary. Lowe also directed a boys' school at Dewsbury. In 1873 he also became a Canon of Ely Cathedral and from 1880 represented the Chapter as Proctor in Convocation. Lowe published several small educational works,

In 1891 on the death of Woodard, he was elected Provost of Lancing College in succession to the founder and returned into Sussex, living at Henfield where he died in 1912. His funeral took place at Ely Cathedral.

== Publications ==
- Porta Latina
- Erasmus College Series (Erasmi Colloquia Selecta)
- An English Primer of Religion and General Instruction, 1866. 2nd Edition 1868.
- Divina Commedia di Dante, Translations Divine Comedy 1902 and 1904
- Young Englishman's First Poetry Book
- An annotated edition of G Herbert's Church Porch
- St. Nicolas College and its Schools - A record of thirty years work to endow the Church of England with a system of self supporting boarding schools, Oxford 1878.
