= Listed buildings in Abbots Bromley =

Abbots Bromley is a civil parish in the district of East Staffordshire, Staffordshire, England. It contains 77 buildings that are recorded in the National Heritage List for England. Of these, three are listed at Grade II*, the middle grade, and the others are at Grade II, the lowest grade. The parish contains the village of Abbots Bromley and the surrounding countryside. Most of the listed buildings are in the village, and most of these are houses, shops and cottages with associated structures, farmhouses and farm buildings, the earliest of which are timber framed or have timber framed cores. Other listed buildings in the village include a church, a village cross, almshouses, public houses, a school chapel, and a war memorial. In the surrounding area, most listed buildings are farmhouses and farm buildings, and the others include lodges, a monument, and mileposts.

== Key ==
Grade	Criteria
II*	Particularly important buildings of more than special interest
II	Buildings of national importance and special interest

== Buildings ==
Name and location	Photograph	Date	Notes	Grade
St Nicholas' Church; 52.81850°N 1.88362°W		c. 1300	The church was altered in about 1500 and in about 1700, and was restored and party rebuilt in 1852–55 by G. E. Street. It is built in stone with tile roofs, and consists of a nave with a clerestory, north and south aisles, a south porch, a chancel with north and south chapels and a northeast vestry, and a west tower. The tower has three stages, a round-headed west doorway, a clock face on the west side, and a balustraded parapet with panelled pedestals at the corners surmounted by urn finials.	II*
Norfolk House; 52.81836°N 1.88142°W	—	16th century	The house, at one time an inn, was extended and partly rebuilt in the 19th century. It is roughcast on a timber framed core, and has a band and a tile roof with coped verges. There are two storeys and three bays, the right bay recessed. Steps with balustrades lead up to the doorway in the right bay, there is a fire window and two sash windows, and the other windows are casements. Inside the house is exposed timber framing.	II
Church House; 52.81913°N 1.88370°W		1619	The house, which was restored in the 20th century, is timber framed on a brick plinth, partly replaced in brick and with a tile roof. It has a roughly L-shaped plan, consisting of a two-bay cross-wing and a two-bay hall range. The cross-wing is gabled with two storeys and an attic, the upper storey and attic jettied, a lower gabled bay with two stories and an attic, and the hall range with one storey and an attic. The windows are mullioned, and there are two gabled dormers.	II*
Coleridge House; 52.81761°N 1.87797°W	—	Early 17th century	The house was remodelled, extended, and partly rebuilt in the 18th century. The original part is timber framed, the rebuilding and extensions are in brick, and the roof is tiled with coped verges on kneelers. There are two storeys and two parallel ranges, the rear range with a rear wing. The front has two bays, the ground floor is roughcast and contains a small window flanked by bay windows, and in the upper floor the windows are casements. The west front has four bays, and contains sash windows with raised keystones.	II
Premises of V. G. Wilson, Butcher; 52.81942°N 1.88386°W		Early 17th century	A house, later a shop, that has been remodelled. It has a timber framed core, refronted in brick with a dentilled eaves course, and a tile roof. There is one storey and an attic, and two bays. In the left bay is a narrow canted bay window, and to the right is a shop front with a tile roof on brackets. Above are two gabled dormers, and there is exposed timber framing in the left gable end.	II
5, 6, 7 and 8 High Street; 52.81805°N 1.88113°W	—	17th century (probable)	A row of four houses that were remodelled in the 19th century. They are in red brick replacing timber framing, and have a tile roof. There are four storeys, four bays, and a gabled cross-wing on the right. There are two bow windows, the other windows being casements, and inside No. 8 is an inglenook fireplace and exposed timber framing.	II
Cael Cottage; 52.81924°N 1.88385°W	—	17th century	Two cottages, later combined into one, in painted brick on a timber framed core with a tile roof. There is one storey and an attic, and two bays. The windows are casements, those in the ground floor with segmental heads, and the doorway to the right also has a segmental head. Above are tile-hung gabled dormers with bargeboards, and inside there are timber framed partitions.	II
Crofts Cottage; 52.81907°N 1.88245°W	—	17th century	The house, which was remodelled in the 18th century, is in brick on a timber framed core and has a tile roof. There are two storeys, three bays, and a low lean-to extension on the right. Steps lead up to the doorway, which is left of centre, and the windows are casements.	II
Gilleon's Hall; 52.79538°N 1.85230°W	—	17th century	A farmhouse with a timber framed core, later encased in brick, it has dentilled eaves and a tile roof. There are two storeys and three bays, with a lower one-bay extension to the right with two storeys and an attic. On the front is a gabled porch, and the windows are casements, those in the ground floor with segmental heads.	II
Heatley Green Farmhouse; 52.83819°N 1.91597°W	—	17th century	The farmhouse is timber framed with brick infill and a tile roof. There are two storeys and an attic, four bays, and a lean-to extension on the right. On the front is a two-storey gabled porch with a moulded bressumer, and the windows are casements.	II
House next newsagents 52.81878°N 1.88174°W	—	17th century (probably)	A pair of cottages, later combined into one house, it is in red brick with a band, chamfered quoins on the left, and a tile roof. There is one storey and an attic, and three bays. On the front is a bow window with a doorway to the right, and casement windows. Above are three gabled dormers with bargeboards, and inside is an inglenook fireplace.	II
Parkside Farmhouse, stable and cowhouse 52.83818°N 1.85488°W	—	17th century	The cottage and attached farm buildings have been altered and extended. The early part is timber framed with brick infill, the additions are in painted brick, and the roof is tiled. The building has an L-shaped plan, the cottage has a rear wing, and the stable and cowhouse are to the southwest. The cottage has one storey and an attic, and contains casement windows, flat-roofed dormers, and a doorway with a rustic porch. The stable has a doorway with a fanlight and a segmental head, a casement window, and a loft opening, and the cowhouse has doors and a skylight. Inside the cottage is an inglenook fireplace.	II
Premises of C. Taswell; 52.81824°N 1.88164°W	—	17th century (probable)	A house incorporating a shop that was remodelled in the 19th century, it is in red brick with a band, dentilled eaves, and a tile roof. There are two storeys and four irregular bays. In the ground floor to the left is a canted bay window, with a door to the right. The main doorway has moulded pilasters and a bracketed hood. Most of the windows are sashes with wedge lintels and raised keystones.	II
The Butter Cross; 52.81868°N 1.88216°W		17th century (probable)	The village cross is timber framed with a hexagonal tile roof, and has a hexagonal plan. It is open sided and has hexagonal timber posts at the angles and in the centre, the central post rising to form a cross. Inside is a patterned cobbled floor.	II*
The Goats Head Inn; 52.81878°N 1.88245°W		17th century	A private house, later a public house, it is timber framed on a brick plinth, and has a tile roof. There are two storeys and an attic, and three bays. The windows are casements.	II
The Old Schoolhouse; 52.82087°N 1.88048°W	—	17th century	A school, later a private house, it was partly rebuilt in the 20th century. The early part is timber framed, the south bay is in brick and roughcast. There are two storeys, the upper storey is jettied, and a T-shaped plan, with three bays, and a central two-storey gabled porch with bargeboards and a finial. The upper storey of the south gable is tile hung, and the windows are casements.	II
Town End Farmhouse; 52.81448°N 1.87661°W	—	17th century	The farmhouse was remodelled in the 19th century. It is in red brick with a dentilled eaves course, and a tile roof with corbelled verges. There are two storeys, and an L-shaped plan with a front of two bays. The central doorway has a segmental head, and the windows are casements, those in the ground floor with segmental heads. Inside, there is an inglenook fireplace and a timber framed partition.	II
The Bagot Almshouses; 52.81908°N 1.88319°W		1705	The almshouses are in red brick with stone dressings on a plinth with moulded capping, and have quoins, coved eaves, and a tile roof, hipped to the right. There are two storeys, a U-shaped plan, and a front of six bays. The windows are iron latticed casements, those in the ground floor with segmental heads. The main doorways are paired, with moulded architraves and a curly pediment containing a coat of arms, and the other doorways have segmental heads.	II
Bentilee Park Farmhouse; 52.80166°N 1.83814°W		Early 18th century	The farmhouse was later altered and extended. It is in red brick with diapering, and has bands, a moulded eaves cornice, and a tile roof. There are two storeys and an attic, and an L-shaped plan, consisting of a hall range, a gabled cross-wing, and extensions at each end. The hall range has two bays, the right bay gabled, and contains a doorway with a fanlight and a hood on pilasters. To the left is an extension with one storey and an attic, and to the right is a lean-to extension. Most of the windows are casements with segmental heads.	II
Chesterton House; 52.81924°N 1.88323°W	—	Early 18th century	A red brick house with the gable end facing the street, bands and moulded eaves courses on the sides, and a tile roof. There are two storeys and an attic, and two bays. The central doorway is approached by steps, and the windows are casements, those in the upper floor and attic with shaped lintels and raised keystones.	II
Church View Farmhouse; 52.81709°N 1.88707°W	—	Early 18th century	The farmhouse, at one time an inn, is in red brick with stepped eaves bands. and tile roofs with crow-stepped gables. There is one storey and an attic, and a T-shaped plan. The doorway has a segmental head, the windows are casements, some with segmental heads, and there are gabled dormers. Inside, there is a timber framed partition.	II
Barn west of Church View Farmhouse; 52.81715°N 1.88741°W	—	Early 18th century	The barn is in red brick with a dentilled eaves course and a tile roof. There is one storey and a loft, and a T-shaped plan with five bays. The openings include a cart entry, doorways with segmental heads, and inserted windows. In the north gable end are nesting holes and platforms, and in the south gable end is a loft door. Inside there are three upper cruck trusses.	II
Ivy Cottage and Callander House; 52.81976°N 1.88654°W	—	Early 18th century	A house, later divided into two, it is in red brick and a tile roof. It has a main block with two storeys and three bays, a floor band, and a moulded eaves course. To the left is a single-storey one-bay wing. The windows are casements with segmental heads, and each house has a lean-to porch.	II
The Coach and Horses; 52.81739°N 1.87726°W		Early 18th century	The public house, which was later remodelled, is pebbledashed with chamfered quoins, and a tile roof. There are two storeys and four bays, the left bay slightly lower, and the windows are casements.	II
The Royal Oak; 52.81949°N 1.88429°W		Early 18th century	The former public house is in painted brick with a floor band, a moulded eaves course, and a tile roof. There are two storeys and an attic, four bays, and a low single-bay extension on the right. The doorway has a moulded surround, the windows are casements with segmental heads and shaped lintels, and the window above the doorway is blind. (Note: Street View in August 2016 shows that the name has been changed to The Royal Ruchi.)	II
Croft's House, wall and railings 52.81893°N 1.88205°W		Mid 18th century	The house, which is in red brick with tile roofs, was later altered and extended. The main block has two storeys and a parapet with three openings containing stone balusters. There are five bays and a central doorway with an elaborate surround, a rectangular fanlight, moulded brackets, a triple keystone, and an entablature. The windows are sashes with shaped lintels, raised keystones, and aprons. To the right is a lower wing with a dentilled eaves course, two storeys, two bays, and sash windows. The forecourt is enclosed by a dwarf wall and wrought iron wavy railings.	II
Dandelion Cottages, wall, gates and railings 52.81751°N 1.87761°W	—	18th century	A row of cottages built in two phases, the later phase added in the 19th century; they are in red brick with tile roofs. The earlier block has two storeys and an attic, four bays, a moulded eaves course, and coped verges. The doorways have bracketed hoods, and the windows are casements with wedge lintels and raised keystones. The later block to the left is lower, with two storeys and two bays, a dentilled eaves course, and stone quoins. The doorways and windows, which are casements, have wedge lintels. In front of the cottages are gardens enclosed by dwarf walls, and cast iron gates and railings.	II
Georgian House; 52.81934°N 1.88425°W	—	Mid 18th century	A red brick house with a tile roof, two storeys and an attic, and three bays. The central doorway has a rectangular fanlight and a bracketed hood, and the windows are sashes with shaped plaster heads and raised keystones.	II
Grange Farmhouse; 52.81506°N 1.85810°W	—	18th century	A red brick farmhouse with dentilled eaves and a tile roof. There are two storeys and an attic, and an L-shaped plan, with a two-bay front and a rear wing. On the front is a central doorway in a conservatory, and the windows are casements.	II
Barn south of High Elms Farmhouse; 52.81359°N 1.89049°W	—	18th century	The barn is in red brick with a tile roof. There is one storey, four bays, and a lean-to extension to the left. It contains a doorway, loft openings and blocked ventilation holes. (Note: Street View in June 2009 shows that the barn has been converted for residential use.)	II
House occupied by Mr. Goodwin; 52.81929°N 1.88335°W		Mid 18th century	A pair of houses later combined into one, they were altered in the 19th century. The house is in red brick with a dentilled eaves course, and a tile roof. There are two storeys and cellars, and five bays. There are two doorways that have flat hoods on console brackets and are approached by steps. In the left bay is a canted bay window with a moulded cornice and a flat hood, and the other windows are sashes with shaped lintels.	II
Inglenook, Oak Cottage and adjacent cottage 52.81953°N 1.88452°W	—	18th century	A terrace of three cottages with tile roofs and two storeys. The main block is in red brick with five bays, a floor band, and a dentilled eaves cornice, and to the left is a lower bay in painted brick. There are three doorways, the two on the right with bracketed hoods. The windows are casements, most with segmental heads.	II
Leacross and adjoining cottage 52.81982°N 1.88674°W	—	18th century	A pair of red brick cottages with a dentilled eaves course and a tile roof. There are two storeys and four bays. The doorways have plain surrounds, and the windows are casements.	II
Manor Farmhouse; 52.81722°N 1.88156°W	—	18th century	The farmhouse is in red brick that has a tile roof with raised verges on kneelers. There are two storeys, a T-shaped plan, and five bays. In the centre is a gabled porch with shaped bargeboards and an apex finial. The windows are casements with shaped lintels and raised keystones.	II
Maxstoke House; 52.81913°N 1.88274°W	—	18th century	A pair of houses in orange brick with a dentilled eaves course and a tile roof. There are two storeys and three bays. The two doorways are approached by steps, and the windows are casements with shaped lintels.	II
Mount Pleasant Farmhouse; 52.79357°N 1.86310°W	—	18th century	A red brick farmhouse with a floor band, a dentilled eaves course, and a tile roof. There are two storeys and an attic, and three bays. On the front is a gabled portico and a doorway with a segmental head, and the windows are casements, also with segmental heads.	II
Northwood House; 52.81938°N 1.88462°W	—	18th century	The house, which was remodelled in the 19th century, is in red brick with a floor band, a moulded eaves course, and a tile roof. There are two storeys and an attic, and three bays. The central doorway has a shaped head, to the left is a bay window, and the other windows are sashes with shaped lintels.	II
Rose House, wall, railings and gate 52.81823°N 1.88115°W	—	Mid 18th century	A house and shop in red brick with a tile roof, and two storeys. The house has three bays, a central doorway with a moulded surround and a flat hood, and the windows are sashes. To the left is a projecting bay with a hipped roof, a shop front in the ground floor, and a sash window above. In front of the house is a small garden with a dwarf brick wall, cast iron railings, and a gate.	II
St. Helens; 52.82007°N 1.88737°W	—	18th century	A red brick house that has a tile roof with raised verges. There are two storeys and an attic, an L-shaped plan, and a front of three bays. The central doorway has a rectangular fanlight and a bracketed hood, and the windows are sashes with wedge lintels.	II
The Bagot Arms; 52.81988°N 1.88593°W		18th century	The public house is in roughcast brick, with floor bands, a dentilled eaves course, and a tile roof. There are two storeys and an attic, a front of three bays, and a low flat-roofed extension to the east. The windows are casements with false shutters.	II
The Maltings; 52.81850°N 1.88146°W	—	18th century	A red brick house with a dentilled eaves course, a tile roof, two storeys, and three bays. In the left bay of the ground floor is a lean-to extension with a slate roof containing a bow window. The doorway has panelled pilasters and a cornice hood, and the windows are sashes, those in the ground floor with cambered heads.	II
Wheelwright House; 52.81933°N 1.88358°W	—	18th century	A red brick house with a tile roof, two storeys, and three bays. The doorway is to the left of centre, with a moulded surround, a segmental head, and a bracketed hood. To the left is a canted bay window, to the right is a sash window, and in the upper floor are casement windows, the middle window blind, and all have segmental heads.	II
Cedar Cottage, gate and railings 52.81857°N 1.88220°W	—	Mid to late 18th century	The house is in painted brick, with a band and a tile roof. There are two storeys and an attic, and two bays. In the ground floor are paired bay windows and a doorway to the right with a shaped lintel and a raised keystone. The windows are casements, also with shaped lintels and raised keystones. In front is a small garden enclosed by cast iron railings with fleur-de-lys heads and a gate.	II
Premises of J.M. Meadows Newsagent; 52.81874°N 1.88158°W	—	Mid to late 18th century	A house incorporating a shop, it is in red brick with a dentilled eaves course, and a tile roof. There are two storeys and an attic, and two bays. To the left is a shop front approached by steps. The other windows are sashes with shaped lintels and raised keystones.	II
The Cross; 52.81829°N 1.88187°W	—	Mid to late 18th century	A red brick house with a tile roof, two storeys and an attic, and three bays. There is a central doorway, and the windows are sashes with shaped lintels and raised keystones.	II
The Big House, School of St. Mary and St. Anne; 52.81807°N 1.87840°W	—	Late 18th century	Originally the schoolmaster's house, it is in red brick, with corner pilaster strips and a hipped tile roof. There are two storeys and an attic, and five bays. The door has a rectangular fanlight, the windows are sashes, and there are three hipped dormers.	II
The Hurst Farmhouse; 52.78939°N 1.86238°W	—	Late 18th century	The farmhouse is in red brick with a band, a dentilled eaves course, and a tile roof. There are two storeys and a basement, and an L-shaped plan, with a front of two bays, a projecting gable to the left, and a rear wing with two storeys and an attic. The windows are casements.	II
Barn, The Hurst Farm; 52.78939°N 1.86193°W	—	Late 18th century	The barn is in red brick with a tile roof, one storey and three bays. It contains a segmental-headed barn door and two tiers of ventilation holes.	II
Granary, stable and cowshed, The Hurst Farm; 52.78947°N 1.86208°W	—	Late 18th century	The farm buildings are in red brick with tile roofs. The stable with a granary above are to the left, and the cowhouse is to the right, with one storey and four bays. They contain a casement window, doorways, and there are external steps in the west gable end.	II
Bank House; 52.81702°N 1.87724°W	—	c. 1800	A red brick house with a dentilled eaves course, and a tile roof with corbelled verges. There are two storeys and an attic, and two bays. The central doorway has a reeded surround and a cornice hood, and the windows are sashes.	II
Norman Villa; 52.81805°N 1.88044°W	—	Late 18th to early 19th century	A red brick house with a moulded parapet and a tile roof. There are three storeys and three bays. The central doorway has fluted pilasters, a rectangular fanlight, and a cornice hood, and the windows are sashes with shaped lintels grooved as voussoirs.	II
Bagot's Bromley Monument; 52.83105°N 1.90195°W		1811	The monument is on the site of a medieval manor house. It is in stone, and has four steps and a square plan, with a flat oversailing cap. On the east side is an inscribed plaque.	II
Laurel Cottage and Office Cottage; 52.82023°N 1.88797°W	—	Early 19th century	Originally a coach house and stables, later converted into two houses, they are in red brick with a floor band and a dentilled eaves course. The roof to the left is tiled, and to the right it is slated. There are two storeys and eight bays. The fifth bay projects, it has a pediment, and contains a segmental-headed doorway. The flanking wings each contain a doorway with a pedimented porch. Some windows are casements, others are sashes, and there are blocked carriage arches.	II
Middleton House; 52.81987°N 1.88692°W	—	Early 19th century	A red brick house with a dentilled eaves course and a tile roof. There are two storeys and an L-shaped plan, with a main range of three bays and a rear wing. In the left bay is a blocked carriage entrance with an inserted window. The doorway has a rectangular fanlight and a bracketed hood, and the windows are sashes.	II
The Green; 52.81837°N 1.88218°W	—	Early 19th century	The house was extended to the right later in the 19th century. It is in red brick with a band and a tile roof. There are two storeys and three bays, the right bay added later. The doorway has pilasters and a flat hood, and the windows are casements with wedge lintels and raised keystones.	II
Batkin House and adjacent house 52.82036°N 1.88780°W	—	Early to mid 19th century	A pair of red brick houses with an eaves band and a slate roof. There are two storeys and four bays. In the centre is an alley opening, and to the right is a bow window and a doorway with a rectangular fanlight and a bracketed hood. The other windows are sashes with bracketed hoods.	II
Coach house, stable, and gate pier, Leafields Farm; 52.82015°N 1.89202°W	—	Early to mid 19th century	The coach house and stable are in red brick with a floor band and a slate roof. There are two storeys, four bays, and an extension to the left. They contain a coach entrance, stable doors, all with segmental heads, and casement windows. From the northeast corner runs a 3 yards (2.7 m) length of wall and a gate pier.	II
Stables, Leafields Farm; 52.82030°N 1.89221°W	—	Early to mid 19th century	The stables are in red brick with a slate roof and three bays. They contain segmental-headed stable doors, a window, air vents, and a pitching hole.	II
Park Lodge; 52.84349°N 1.84743°W	—	Early to mid 19th century	The farmhouse is at the entrance to Bagot's Park, and is in Tudor Revival style. It is in red brick with diapering, and has a tile roof. There are two storeys and an attic. The south front has two gabled bays and a gabled porch, and the west front also has three gabled bays, the middle bay recessed. The windows are mullioned with casements and hood moulds, and the gables have decorative bargeboards and finials.	II
Barn and cartshed south of Park Lodge; 52.84335°N 1.84714°W	—	Early to mid 19th century	The farm buildings are in red brick with diapering, and they have a tile roof. There is one storey and a loft and four bays. The cartshed is on the left and contains a carriage arch and segmental-headed openings in the ground floor and loft. To the right is a lower range with a low extension.	II
Sunny Brae and Sunny Mead; 52.82022°N 1.88731°W	—	Early to mid 19th century	A pair of stuccoed houses with moulded eaves and a tile roof. There are two storeys and three bays. In the left bay is a carriage entrance with a four-centred arch, and the other bays have doorways with bracketed hoods. The windows are sashes with shaped lintels.	II
The Bakery; 52.81921°N 1.88309°W		Early to mid 19th century	A house incorporating a shop, it is in red brick with a dentilled eaves course and a tile roof. There are two storeys and three bays. Steps lead up to the two doorways that have bracketed hoods. In the left bay is a canted bay window, and the other windows are sashes with shaped heads.	II
Leafields Farmhouse, wall and gate pier 52.82014°N 1.89173°W	—	1837	The farmhouse is in red brick with sill bands and an overhanging hipped slate roof. There are two storeys and three bays, the middle bay projecting under a gable containing a date plaque. To the right is a recessed service wing with an extension. The central doorway has a Tuscan surround and a semicircular head. The windows are sashes, in the ground floor they are recessed under semicircular heads, in the upper floor they have plaster architraves, and the central window has a scrolled head. To the right runs a 3 yards (2.7 m) length of wall and a gate pier.	II
Goats Lodge; 52.83406°N 1.88143°W		1839	A lodge at the entrance to Bagot's Park, it was designed by James Trubshaw. It is in brick with applied timber framing on a stone plinth with stone dressings, and has overhanging tile roofs with shaped fretted bargeboards and finials. There are two bays, the left bay with one storey and an attic, and the right bay a two-storey gabled porch. The porch has a moulded Tudor arched opening over which is a string course with carved goats' heads. The windows have moulded mullions, and in the left bay is a gabled dormer. The chimney stacks are decorated, including carvings of deer's heads. The attic in the south front is jettied, and in the ground floor is a mullioned and transomed window.	II
Bromley House; 52.82017°N 1.88771°W	—	c. 1840	The house is pebbledashed with a tile roof. There are three storeys, two bays, and a two-storey service wing to the right. The right bay is gabled with bargeboards. The doorway has a moulded surround, a rectangular fanlight, and a bracketed cornice hood. To the right of the doorway is a canted bay window, and the other windows are sashes with shaped heads and raised keystones. In the service wing is a four-centred arched carriage entrance.	II
Falcott and Inglenook; 52.81790°N 1.88057°W	—	c. 1840	A pair of red brick houses with a tile roof, two storeys and three bays. The doorways have bracketed hoods, and the windows are casements with returned hood moulds.	II
Stables and former cartsheds, Bentilee Park Farm; 52.80198°N 1.83792°W	—	Mid 19th century	The buildings are in red brick with tile roofs, and consist of three ranges forming three sides of a yard. Some of the stables have lofts, and the openings include loft doors, stable doors, cartshed entrances, and casement windows.	II
Wall east of Gilleon's Hall; 52.79545°N 1.85203°W	—	Mid 19th century (probable)	The wall is in red brick, and incorporates four fowl pens with segmental heads to the north, and bee boles to the south.	II
Harley Farmhouse; 52.82026°N 1.88749°W	—	Mid 19th century	The house is in painted brick with a dentilled eaves course and a tile roof. There are two storeys and two bays. The central doorway has a bracketed hood, and the windows are sashes with wedge lintels.	II
Milepost at NGR SK06872824; 52.85148°N 1.89960°W		Mid to late 19th century	The milepost is on the west side of the B5013 road. It is in cast iron with a triangular plan and a cambered top. On the top is inscribed "ABBOTS BROMLEY" and on the sides are the distances to Abbots Bromley, Uttoxeter, Handsacre, Burton upon Trent, and Lichfield.	II
Milepost at NGR SK06912666; 52.83755°N 1.89884°W		Mid to late 19th century	The milepost is on the west side of the B5013 road. It is in cast iron with a triangular plan and a cambered top. On the top is inscribed "ABBOTS BROMLEY" and on the sides are the distances to Abbots Bromley, Uttoxeter, Handsacre, Burton upon Trent, and Lichfield.	II
Milepost at NGR SK08382435; 52.81660°N 1.87707°W		Mid to late 19th century	The milepost is on the west side of the B5014 road. It is in cast iron with a triangular plan and a cambered top. On the top is inscribed "ABBOTS BROMLEY" and on the sides are the distances to Uttoxeter, Newborough, Handsacre, Burton upon Trent, and Lichfield.	II
Milepost at NGR SK08652289; 52.80369°N 1.87275°W		Mid to late 19th century	The milepost is on the west side of the B5014 road. It is in cast iron with a triangular plan and a cambered top. On the top is inscribed "ABBOTS BROMLEY" and on the sides are the distances to Abbots Bromley, Uttoxeter, Handsacre, and Lichfield.	II
Milepost at NGR SK09982420; 52.81526°N 1.85342°W		Mid to late 19th century	The milepost is on the southeast side of the B5234 road. It is in cast iron with a triangular plan and a cambered top. On the top is inscribed "ABBOTS BROMLEY" and on the sides are the distances to Abbots Bromley, Newborough and Burton upon Trent.	II
Lychgate, St Nicholas' Church; 52.81857°N 1.88305°W	—	Mid to late 19th century	The lychgate at the entrance to the churchyard was designed by William Butterfield. It is timber framed, and has a hipped tile roof. The main gateway is to the left, and there is a small arched gateway to the right.	II
Chapel, School of St Mary and St Anne; 52.81781°N 1.87884°W		1875–81	The chapel was designed by R. H. Carpenter and Benjamin Ingelow in Gothic style. It is in red brick on a coped plinth, with stone dressings, a moulded eaves course, and a tile roof with crested ridge tiles. It consists of a nave with a semi-octagonal chancel, and at the west end is a block with a hipped roof and a semi-octagonal projection.	II
War memorial 52.81839°N 1.88180°W		1920	The war memorial stands at a road junction, and is in Hollington stone. It has an octagonal base and a pedestal, on which is a tall, square shaft carrying a cross with gablets at its base. On the pedestal are Gothic panelled shafts at the corners, and slate panels with inscriptions and the names of those lost in the First World War.	II

== Notes and references ==
=== Sources ===
- Historic England, "Church of St. Nicholas, Abbots Bromley (1374461)", National Heritage List for England
- Historic England, "Norfolk House, Abbots Bromley (1038425)", National Heritage List for England
- Historic England, "Church House, Abbots Bromley (1038414)", National Heritage List for England
- Historic England, "Coleridge House, School of St. Mary and St. Anne, Abbots Bromley (1374464)", National Heritage List for England
- Historic England, "Premises of V. G. Wilson Butcher, Abbots Bromley (1189748)", National Heritage List for England
- Historic England, "Nos. 5, 6, 7 and 8 High Street, Abbots Bromley (1294088)", National Heritage List for England
- Historic England, "Cael Cottage, Abbots Bromley (1189755)", National Heritage List for England
- Historic England, "Crofts Cottage, Abbots Bromley (1038411)", National Heritage List for England
- Historic England, "Gilleon's Hall, Abbots Bromley (1038388)", National Heritage List for England
- Historic England, "Heatley Green Farmhouse, Abbots Bromley (1189808)", National Heritage List for England
- Historic England, "House next newsagents, Abbots Bromley (1038385)", National Heritage List for England
- Historic England, "Parkside Farmhouse and attached stable and cowhouse, Abbots Bromley (1189942)", National Heritage List for England
- Historic England, "Premises of C. Taswell, Abbots Bromley (1374485)", National Heritage List for England
- Historic England, "The Butter Cross, Abbots Bromley (1038424)", National Heritage List for England
- Historic England, "The Goats Head Inn, Abbots Bromley (1038387)", National Heritage List for England
- Historic England, "The Old Schoolhouse, Abbots Bromley (1374488)", National Heritage List for England
- Historic England, "Town End Farmhouse, Abbots Bromley (1189861)", National Heritage List for England
- Historic England, "The Bagot Almshouses, Abbots Bromley (1374459)", National Heritage List for England
- Historic England, "Bentilee Park Farmhouse, Abbots Bromley (1038417)", National Heritage List for England
- Historic England, "Chesterton House, Abbots Bromley (1294115)", National Heritage List for England
- Historic England, "Church View Farmhouse, Abbots Bromley (1374462)", National Heritage List for England
- Historic England, "Barn approximately 10 yards west of Church View Farmhouse, Abbots Bromley (1189805)", National Heritage List for England
- Historic England, "Ivy Cottage and Callander House, Abbots Bromley (1374460)", National Heritage List for England
- Historic England, "The Coach and Horses, Abbots Bromley (1374463)", National Heritage List for England
- Historic England, "The Royal Oak, Abbots Bromley (1038412)", National Heritage List for England
- Historic England, "Croft's House, forecourt wall and railings, Abbots Bromley (1038426)", National Heritage List for England
- Historic England, "Dandelion Cottages, garden wall, gates and railings, School of St, Mary and St Anne, Abbots Bromley (1294080)", National Heritage List for England
- Historic England, "Georgian House, Abbots Bromley (1294133)", National Heritage List for England
- Historic England, "Grange Farmhouse, Abbots Bromley (1038406)", National Heritage List for England
- Historic England, "Barn approximately 10 yards south of High Elms Farmhouse, Abbots Bromley (1038390)", National Heritage List for England
- Historic England, "House occupied by Mr. Goodwin, Abbots Bromley (1189735)", National Heritage List for England
- Historic England, "Inglenook, Oak Cottage and house occupied by Mrs. Turner, Abbots Bromley (1374458)", National Heritage List for England
- Historic England, "Leacross and adjoining cottage to east, Abbots Bromley (1189774)", National Heritage List for England
- Historic England, "Manor Farmhouse, Abbots Bromley (1038418)", National Heritage List for England
- Historic England, "Maxstoke House, Abbots Bromley (1294122)", National Heritage List for England
- Historic England, "Mount Pleasant Farmhouse, Abbots Bromley (1189940)", National Heritage List for England
- Historic England, "Northwood House, Abbots Bromley (1294097)", National Heritage List for England
- Historic England, "Rose House, garden wall, railings and gate, Abbots Bromley (1038419)", National Heritage List for England
- Historic England, "St Helens, Abbots Bromley (1374490)", National Heritage List for England
- Historic England, "The Bagot Arms, Abbots Bromley (1038410)", National Heritage List for England
- Historic England, "The Maltings, Abbots Bromley (1374483)", National Heritage List for England
- Historic England, "Wheelwright House, Abbots Bromley (1038413)", National Heritage List for England
- Historic England, "Cedar Cottage and gate and railings to front garden, Abbots Bromley (1189870)", National Heritage List for England
- Historic England, "Premises of J.M. Meadows Newsagent, Abbots Bromley (1038384)", National Heritage List for England
- Historic England, "The Cross, Abbots Bromley (1374484)", National Heritage List for England
- Historic England, "The Big House, School of St. Mary and St. Anne, Abbots Bromley (1189819)", National Heritage List for England
- Historic England, "The Hurst Farmhouse, Abbots Bromley (1038389)", National Heritage List for England
- Historic England, "Barn approximately 30 yards east of The Hurst Farmhouse, Abbots Bromley (1189936)", National Heritage List for England
- Historic England, "Granary, stable and cowhouse approximately 10 yards east of The Hurst Farmhouse, Abbots Bromley (1374487)", National Heritage List for England
- Historic England, "Bank House, Abbots Bromley (1038422)", National Heritage List for England
- Historic England, "Norman Villa, Abbots Bromley (1189809)", National Heritage List for England
- Historic England, "Bagot's Bromley Monument approximately 250 yards south-east of Bagot's Bromley Farmhouse, Abbots Bromley (1038405)", National Heritage List for England
- Historic England, "Laurel Cottage and Office Cottage, Abbots Bromley (1374489)", National Heritage List for England
- Historic England, "Middleton House, Abbots Bromley (1038415)", National Heritage List for England
- Historic England, "The Green, Abbots Bromley (1038386)", National Heritage List for England
- Historic England, "Batkin House and house occupied by Mrs. Heathcote, Abbots Bromley (1294014)", National Heritage List for England
- Historic England, "Coach house, stable and attached wall and gate pier approximately 10 yards north-west of Leafields Farmhouse, Abbots Bromley (1038393)", National Heritage List for England
- Historic England, "Stables approximately 20 yards west of Leafields Farmhouse, Abbots Bromley (1189967)", National Heritage List for England
- Historic England, "Park Lodge, Abbots Bromley (1374456)", National Heritage List for England
- Historic England, "Barn and cartshed approximately 10 yards south of Park Lodge, Abbots Bromley (1038409)", National Heritage List for England
- Historic England, "Sunny Brae and Sunny Mead, Abbots Bromley (1038392)", National Heritage List for England
- Historic England, "The Bakery, Abbots Bromley (1374457)", National Heritage List for England
- Historic England, "Leafields Farmhouse and attached wall and gate pier, Abbots Bromley (1294020)", National Heritage List for England
- Historic England, "Goats Lodge, Abbots Bromley (1038416)", National Heritage List for England
- Historic England, "Bromley House, Abbots Bromley (1294016)", National Heritage List for England
- Historic England, "Falcott and Inglenook, Abbots Bromley (1038421)", National Heritage List for England
- Historic England, "Stables and former cartsheds approximately 10 yards east of Bentilee Park Farmhouse, Abbots Bromley (1294108)", National Heritage List for England
- Historic England, "Wall incorporating bee boles and fowl pens immediately east of Gilleon's Hall, Abbots Bromley (1374486)", National Heritage List for England
- Historic England, "Harley Farmhouse, Abbots Bromley (1038391)", National Heritage List for England
- Historic England, "Milepost at N.G.R. SK 06872824, Abbots Bromley (1038407)", National Heritage List for England
- Historic England, "Milepost at N.G.R. SK 06912666, Abbots Bromley (1374454)", National Heritage List for England
- Historic England, "Milepost at N.G.R. SK 08382435, Abbots Bromley (1038423)", National Heritage List for England
- Historic England, "Milepost at N.G.R. SK 08652289, Abbots Bromley (1189852)", National Heritage List for England
- Historic England, "Milepost at N.G.R. SK 09982420, Abbots Bromley (1038408)", National Heritage List for England
- Historic England, "Lychgate to Church of St. Nicholas, Abbots Bromley (1294107)", National Heritage List for England
- Historic England, "The Chapel, School of St. Mary and St. Anne, Abbots Bromley (1038420)", National Heritage List for England
- Historic England, "War memorial, Abbots Bromley (1381258)", National Heritage List for England
- Historic England, Listed Buildings
- Pevsner, Nikolaus (1974), Staffordshire, The Buildings of England, Harmondsworth: Penguin Books, ISBN 0-14-071046-9
