= Philip Lawley =

British chemist

- Born: 4 July 1927; Abbots Bromley, Staffordshire, England
- Died: 18 December 2011 (aged 84)
- Citizenship: England
- Education: University of Oxford; University of Nottingham
- Known for: Molecular Mechanisms of Cancer
- Scientific career
- Fields: Chemistry
- Workplaces: University of London; Institute of Cancer Research; University of Oxford; University of Nottingham

Philip Douglas Lawley (4 July 1927 – 18 December 2011) was a British chemist, best known for demonstrating that DNA damage was the base cause of cancer working with Peter Brookes. In January 2003 the ICR honoured the achievements of Brookes and Lawley by naming a £21m laboratory after them. It is devoted to research on the genetic nature of cancer and located next to the Haddow laboratories.
