= Marcia Rice =

(1868–1958), British headmistress and historian

- Born: 5 December 1868; Edinburgh, Scotland
- Died: 22 April 1958 (aged 89); Sunningwell, England
- Occupation: head teacher
- Known for: head of School of S. Mary and S. Anne which became Abbots Bromley School
- Predecessor: Alice Mary Coleridge

Marcia Alice Rice (5 December 1868 – 22 April 1958) was a British headmistress and historian. She was the head of the girls' School of S. Mary and S. Anne which became Abbots Bromley School.

== Life ==
Rice was born in Edinburgh on 5 December 1868. She was a Scottish episcopalian and the second child of Frances Anne Napier and Lieutenant-Colonel Cecil Rice of the Seaforth Highlanders. She was taught at home learning Latin and Greek. She sent to Oxford to study English and St Hugh's College gave her an "excellent first".

Rice had natural authority and good humour and her progress was rapid. She spent a year as house mistress at Godolphin School in Salisbury before she became the headteacher of the School of S. Anne in Abbots Bromley in 1900. She succeeded Alice Mary Coleridge who had founded the two schools there. Her school (S. Anne) had 54 pupils. Immediately opposite was the School of S. Mary which had also been founded by Alice Mary Coleridge to cater for girls whose parents could only afford more modest fees and it had a different head teacher.

Her school was divided into houses. In 1903 she was an attendant when one of staff, Edith Amy Isabelle Benett Wollaston, married an architect Isaac Taylor. Taylor became the school's architect. It had expanded to over 100 girls by 1913 and the school had gained nearby property to allow for expansion of an infirmary, chapel cloisters and more accommodation. In 1905 the school gained a debating Society "St Anne's Political and Social Problems Club" and in 1910 the first school prefects were appointed as some authority was delegated from the staff to the pupils.

During World War One the school had a cadet force, but at the end of the war the group was converted into a Girl Guides troupe. Her school was not selective in terms of an entrance exam but it did have high fees. The school had therefore to look after not only its academic pupils striving for university entry but the curriculum also included technical, practical subjects and games.

S. Mary's did not prove to be viable, so the schools were amalgamated in 1921 under headteacher Rice who had to tactfully manage the merger with girls from more modest homes. Rice retired in 1931 when there were 300 pupils. She took to studying history using her contacts in the area to write Abbots Bromley in 1939.

Rice died 22 April 1958 in Sunningwell. Her school closed permanently in the summer of 2019 due to financial problems.
