= Alice Mary Coleridge =

British promoter of girls' schools (1846–1907)

Alice Coleridge
- Born: 27 March 1846; Ottery St Mary
- Died: 12 February 1907 (aged 60); Henfield
- Known for: founding Abbots Bromley School for Girls
- Successor: Marcia Rice

Alice Mary Coleridge (27 March 1846 – 12 February 1907) was a British promoter of girls' schools. She was the instigator of the former Abbots Bromley School for Girls.

== Life ==
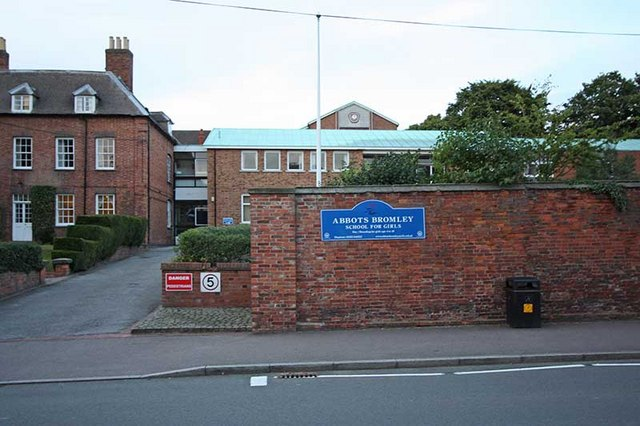
Abbots Bromley School for Girls

Coleridge was born in 1846 in the manor house of Ottery St Mary, East Devon, to Francis George Coleridge and his wife. Alice's mother, Harriet, became mentally ill after giving birth to Alice.

Edward Clarke Lowe married Alice's elder sister Harriet Duke Coleridge. Alice was brought up by Edward and Harriet at Hurstpierpoint College where Edward was the head.

Alice Coleridge, had been greatly influenced by the writer Anna Sewell and her godmother, Charlotte Mary Yonge. Around 1859 Yonge created a literary group of younger girl cousins to write essays and gain advice from Yonge on their writing. Together they created a private magazine called "The Barnacle" in a collaboration that continued until about 1871. This was valuable as this may have been the last generation of girls to be educated at home. Alice was unusual in getting "a boy's education". Alice contributed under the name "Gurgoyle". From the first issue she drew the covers and contributed translations, articles, riddles and verses.

Alice read many of Yonge's novels. Yonge's example and influence on her goddaughter are thought to have played a formative role in Coleridge's zeal for women's education, and so indirectly led to the establishment of Abbots Bromley School for Girls, which survived until 2019.

Woodard thought his foundation would be wasting its efforts in promoting the education of women. Lowe, who owed much to his well-educated older sister Emily, strongly disagreed. He believed that university education should be open to women and with his friends eventually prevailed upon Woodard to give his blessing and use his enormous fund-raising skills for the foundation of the School of St. Anne at Abbots Bromley in 1874.

Coleridge became Lady Warden of St. Anne's in 1878 and instituted a no-frills management and a wide curriculum. Coleridge had to retire in 1898 due to a stroke. She was succeeded by Marcia Rice who was a head teacher there until 1931 and then went on to write a history of the school that Coleridge had founded.

She died in Henfield in 1907.

In 2016 a new conference centre was opened in the sixth-form college at Abbotts Bromley, which included the Alice Mary Coleridge Conference Room. However, the school closed permanently in the summer of 2019 due to financial problems over many years.
