= Margaret Cooper (nurse) =

English nurse

- Born: Margaret Jean Drummond Cooper; 23 March 1922
- Died: 15 September 2013 (aged 91)
- Education: School of St Mary and St Ann
- Occupation: Nurse

Margaret Jean Drummond Cooper (23 March 1922 – 15 September 2013) was an English nurse and nurse-tutor. She developed a view that theoretical knowledge should be applied to practical training, and wanted to improve the education of nurses and their competence. Cooper held tutoring positions at Northampton General Hospital and Addenbrooke's Hospital and later served as the Queen Elizabeth School of Nursing's principal.

== Biography ==
=== Early life ===
Cooper was born on 23 March 1922. She was the oldest daughter of Canon Bernard and Jean Cooper, and was raised in Oadby. Cooper had two sisters. She was educated at the School of St Mary and St Ann (now called Abbots Bromley School).

=== Career ===
Cooper completed her nurse training at Leicester Royal Infirmary, where she was awarded a gold medal for being the hospital's best student. She later learned to become a midwife at General Lying-In Hospital. Cooper started education in nursing at Middlesex Hospital as their nurse tutor. A Nightingale scholarship funded her to travel to Scandinavia and went to several nurse-training institutes. During this period, Cooper developed a view that theoretical knowledge should be applied alongside practical training, which would allow nurses to improve their understanding of their roles in the National Health Service. She set herself the objective of improving the competence and education of nurses in the United Kingdom.

Cooper held a principal tutor position at Northampton General Hospital, and later at Addenbrooke's Hospital. She later was appointed principal of Queen Elizabeth School of Nursing. While in that position, Cooper developed a new curriculum which mixed practical nursing skills that were supervised by clinical tutors with theory study. She served as chief education officer for the General Nursing Council of England and Wales from 1974 to 1982. Cooper carried over her curriculum to the Council. In 1980, she was awarded an OBE for her services to nurse education. Cooper was also president of the Guild of St Barnabas for Nurses, which provided nurses with spiritual support.

=== Later life and death ===
She retired to Saffron Walden, Essex. Cooper completed a degree with the Open University, and volunteered with a bereavement counselling charity called Cruse. In 1998, she wrote a paper called The Best and Worst of Care during Recovery from a Stroke for the Royal Commission for the Long-term Care of the Elderly. After her health deteriorated and she lost her sight, she spent her final years in a nursing home in Gerrards Cross, Buckinghamshire. Cooper died on 15 September 2013.
