= Abbots Bromley School =

Former independent school in Staffordshire, England

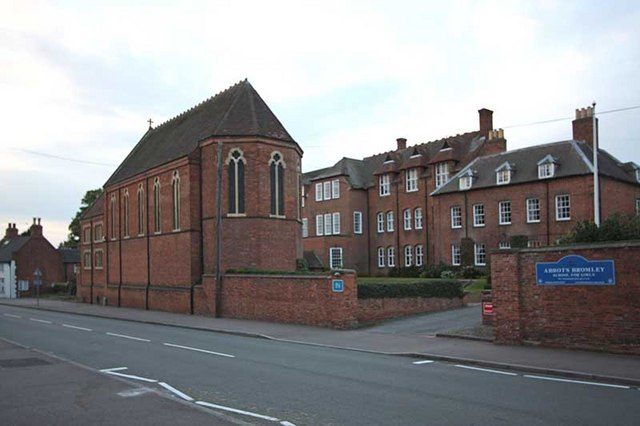

Location
- Abbots Bromley, Staffordshire, WS15 3BW; England; 52.817438°N 1.879474°W

Information
- Type: Private day & boarding
- Motto: That Our Daughters May Be as the Polished Corners of the Temple
- Religious affiliation: Church of England
- Established: 1874
- Founder: Canon Nathaniel Woodard
- Closed: Summer 2019
- Local authority: Staffordshire
- Department for Education URN: 124470 Tables
- Staff: 21 full time, 16 part time
- Gender: Girls School
- Age: 3 to 18
- Enrolment: 250
- Houses: 6
- Colours: Red and Blue
- Affiliation: Woodard Corporation
- Website: http://www.abbotsbromleyschool.com

Abbots Bromley School (previously the School of S. Mary and S. Anne, Abbots Bromley before becoming Abbots Bromley School for Girls) was an all girls boarding and day private school in the village of Abbots Bromley, Staffordshire, England. It was one of the original Woodard Schools — and the first such for girls — and so was an Anglican foundation that historically reflected the Anglo-Catholic ethos of the Woodard Foundation. It was affiliated to the Girls' Schools Association, but financial problems over many years closed it in the summer of 2019.

== History ==
=== The School of S. Anne ===
With the foundation of the School of S. Anne, Nathaniel Woodard's project to provide education for the middle classes was extended to girls. Woodard had been reluctant to start a school for girls, but some of his closest friends strongly disagreed. Edward Clarke Lowe, in particular, believed that university education should be open to women. These friends eventually prevailed upon Woodard and secured his blessing and his enormous fund-raising skills to found the School of S. Anne in 1874. Even after its opening, Woodard continued to express the view that his foundation might be wasting its efforts in promoting the education of women.

The school was established at Abbots Bromley partly because it was near Denstone College, another Woodard school which had been founded a few years before. Its location in the Anglican diocese of Lichfield also helped to secure for it the goodwill of Bishop Selwyn.

Alice Mary Coleridge, Lowe's sister-in-law and adopted child, played a central role in the evolving vision that led to the foundation of the school. Alice Coleridge, who had been greatly influenced by Anna Sewell and her godmother, Charlotte Mary Yonge, became Lady Warden of S. Anne's in 1878 and instituted a spartan regime and a broadly based curriculum.

Marcia Rice, a Scottish episcopalian with natural authority, became the head in 1900 when there were 54 pupils. The school gained four houses and it expanded to over 100 by 1913 and the school bought nearby property to allow for the required expansion of an infirmary, chapel cloisters and more accommodation. In 1905 the school gained a debating Society "St Anne's Political and Social Problems Club" and in 1910 the first school prefects were appointed as some authority was delegated from the staff to the pupils.

During World War One the school had a cadet force, but at the end of the war the group was converted into a Girl Guides troupe.

The school was not selective in terms of an entrance exam but it did have high fees. The school had therefore to look after not only its academic pupils striving for university entry but the curriculum also included technical, practical subjects and games. As the school merged the head of this school had to tactfully manage the merger with girls from more modest homes.

=== The School of S. Mary ===
Given the missionary ethos of the school's foundation, Alice Coleridge also tried to make some educational provision for girls from families who were unable to afford the fees required by the School of S. Anne. As a result, the School of S. Mary was founded in Abbots Bromley in 1880 to educate more cheaply 'the daughters of clergymen and other professional men of limited means and of the agricultural and commercial classes generally'. The School of S. Mary was built on a site immediately opposite the School of S. Anne.

S. Mary's did not prove to be viable, so the schools were amalgamated in 1921 under headteacher Marcia Rice. She retired in 1931 when there were 300 pupils.

== Closure ==
In March 2019, the school announced that it would be closing at the end of the 2018–2019 school year. This was due both to falling pupil numbers and longstanding financial problems, requiring the parent Woodard Group to inject £2 million of emergency funding to prevent bankruptcy.

Subsequently, talks were held with investors in Beijing and Hong Kong to see if the school could be sold as a going concern, but no agreement could be reached. As a result, in September 2019 the Woodard group announced the land would be sold by Savills and no further talks would be held on reopening the school.

=== Statistics ===
At closure the school had 271 pupils, over 85 of them boarders.

The school was not academically selective but achieved academic results that were generally seen as outstanding for a non-selective school. Its academic, social and sporting provisions were normal for girls' independent schools, but it had two specialities: an equestrian centre and a dance school (Alkins School of Ballet).

The school occupied 53 acres (210,000 m^{2}), split between two sites on either side of the village High Street.

=== Ethos ===
Historically, the school was a boarding school, but for some time before closure the majority of pupils had been day pupils. However, the school had restored its boarding ethos to offer a range of boarding alternatives – full, weekly, flexi and occasional boarding. The School took boys and girls from Reception to Year 6 and then girls from Year 7 to 11. The sixth form was co-educational, with a new facility for its International College.

Roch House Preparatory School in 1991 took on extra staff based in an upstairs corridor near Reed Hall with a classroom for UII girls. A couple of years later Roch expanded again to include girls between three and eleven.

=== Houses ===
In the 1990s the houses were: St Mary's side = Roch (red), KSB (bright green), Selwyn (light blue/grey) St Mary's and St Anne's but next to the road = Coleridge (yellow) St Anne's = Heywood Rice (light purple/lilac), Meynell Lowe (red/blue stripe), Talbot aka Crofts (Dark green). These were latterly changed to four houses: Saint Anne's (blue), Saint Mary's (red), Saint Chads (Burgundy) and Saint Greg's (grey).

Abbots Bromley Prep School:

House	Colour
Argyle	Green
Benets	Red
Duttons	yellow
Stretton	Blue

Abbots Bromley Senior School:

House	Colour
St Anne	Blue
St Chad	Burgundy
St Gregory	Steel Grey
St Mary	Red

=== Commemoration Day: "Jerusalem Heights" ===
The school's Commemoration Day Procession took place during the summer term. Pupils would process to the Parish Church of St Nicholas, down the centre of the High Street, in height order wearing white veils fringed with light blue, known as "hoods" or "tea-towels", carrying embroidered banners and singing the hymn "Jerusalem my happy home". Members of the school choir wore an additional ankle-length white veil, known as "cloaks" or "tablecloths". The service would conclude with the singing of "Forward be our watchword".

== Notable former pupils ==
- Vera Chok (living), actress
- Margaret Cooper (1922–2013), nurse
- Hazel Dolling (1923–2006), châtelaine of Lissan House, Northern Ireland
- Annie Kevans (born 1972), artist
- Lu Yuxiao (born 1999), Chinese actress
- Lady Olga Maitland (born 1944), Conservative Member of Parliament
- Sue Nicholls (born 1943), actress
- Margery Perham (1895–1982), Dame, expert in British colonial history and first woman Reith Lecturer
- Philippa Perry (born 1957), psychotherapist and author
- Kelly England Prehn (living), international model
- Anna Richardson (born 1970), television presenter
- Helen Watts (1927–2009), Welsh contralto singer

== See also ==
- Single-sex education
- Independent school (United Kingdom)
