= Dancing England =

Dancing England was a series of showcase traditional dance concerts held at the Derby Assembly Rooms from 1979 to 1987. They were devised and curated by Phil Heaton and John Shaw, members of the Black Cap Sword Dancers.

In 1979 Phil and John of Black Cap invited dancers from across the UK as their guests.
