= Violet Alford =

British dancer

- Born: 18 March 1881; Cleeve, Somerset, UK
- Died: 16 February 1972 (age 90); Somerset, UK
- Occupations: Folklorist, writer

Violet Alford (18 March 1881 – 16 February 1972) was an internationally recognised authority on folk dancing and its related music, costume, and folk customs. She believed that a common prehistoric root explained the similarities found across much of Europe.

== Early life ==
Alford was born in Cleeve, Somerset, the third daughter of Josiah George Alford and Catherine Mary Leslie Alford. Her father was Canon of Bristol Cathedral. Her father taught her and her sisters music, and a governess was responsible for their other early education. After completing her studies at Clifton High School Violet was sent to a finishing school for girls in Switzerland.

== Scholarship ==
Alford spent her summers observing dances in the Pyrenees, and her winters writing and researching at the University of Bristol and the British Museum. She also learned the Basque language, and learned to perform some of the Basque dances she studied. She was secretary of the first International Folk Dance Festival, held in London in 1935 and chaired by musicologist Maud Karpeles. In 1936 she was a founding member of the International Folk Music Council. Her work was described as "dance ritual archaeology" by a fellow scholar. "She was especially concerned with the degenerative popular adaptation of traditional customs and media representation," wrote another folklorist, Paul Cowdell, of her strong interest in authenticity.

Alford supervised the moving, cataloguing, and unpacking of the Vaughan Williams Memorial Library during World War II. From 1946 to 1953, she was an editor of the Handbooks of European Dances series. She was also an adjudicator at the Llangollen International Musical Eisteddfod, judging folk dances and instrumental music. From 1949 to 1953, she served on the executive committee of the English Folk Dance Society.

== Selected works ==
In addition to her scholarship, Alford wrote two novels, The Blue Dress and Wind from the South (1929).

- Peeps at English Folk-dances (1923)
- English Folk Dances (1925)
- "The Dancing Travellers" (1927)
- The Traditional Dance (1935), in collaboration with Rodney Gallop
- Pyrenean Festivals (1937)
- "Valencian Cross-Roads" (1937)
- Introduction to English Folklore (1952)
- Dances of France: The Pyrenees (1952)
- The Singing of the Travels (1956)
- Sword Dance and Drama (1962)
- The Hobby Horse and Other Animal Masks (1978, published posthumously)

== Personal life ==
Alford lived with her nephew, Dr. Ormerod, in her later years. At age 86, she traveled around the world, visiting New Zealand and Australia, and crossing through the Panama Canal. She died in 1972, at the age of 90.
