= Kelly Prehn =

British model

- Born: Stafford, England
- Occupations: Model; writer
- Website: kellyprehn.com

Kelly Prehn (also known as Kelly England Prehn) is a British model, editor, influencer, fashion ambassador, and businesswoman.

== Early life and discovery ==
At 17 years old, Prehn was spotted during a school trip to Covent Garden by a scout from Models 1 agency. Her first contract was in Tokyo, where she became the muse of Shu Uemura.

Prehn attended Abbots Bromley School. She holds a degree from the London School of Economics.

== Career ==
=== Modeling ===
Prehn has had over 200 appearances in editorials such as Vogue, Marie Claire, 25ans, Just Seventeen, Cosmopolitan, and Noblesse. She worked as a model in Paris, London, Tokyo, Milan, Shanghai, Hong Kong, Singapore and Seoul doing campaigns, editorial, and runway. Prehn's campaigns included Lancôme, RMK, and Shu Uemura.

=== Writing ===
In 2007, Prehn became a writer for the South China Morning Post. Prehn is also the author of the popular magazine Guide to Life.

=== Ambassador ===
Prehn is a British Fashion Ambassador. She is currently considered one of the most influential people in the fashion industry in Asia.

=== Other work ===
Described as the Pride of the Potteries, Prehn has also been recognized for helping Wedgwood and other Staffordshire pottery firms get on the map in Asia.

She has also been featured in the 2000 music video of Saltwater by Chicane.

== Charity ==
Prehn is involved in various charities, including the Youth Diabetes Association. In 2017, she won Jackie Collins' pair of diamond and pearl earrings at a charity auction she attended as part of her role as Britain Fashion Ambassador. A portion of all proceeds were donated to organizations supporting the empowerment of women: Malala Fund, Equality Now and WriteGirl. Prehn is also involved in promoting animal welfare, including elephants and encourages fashion brands to not use fur.
