= Abbots Bromley =

Village in Staffordshire, England

Coordinates: 52.81804°N 1.880636°W

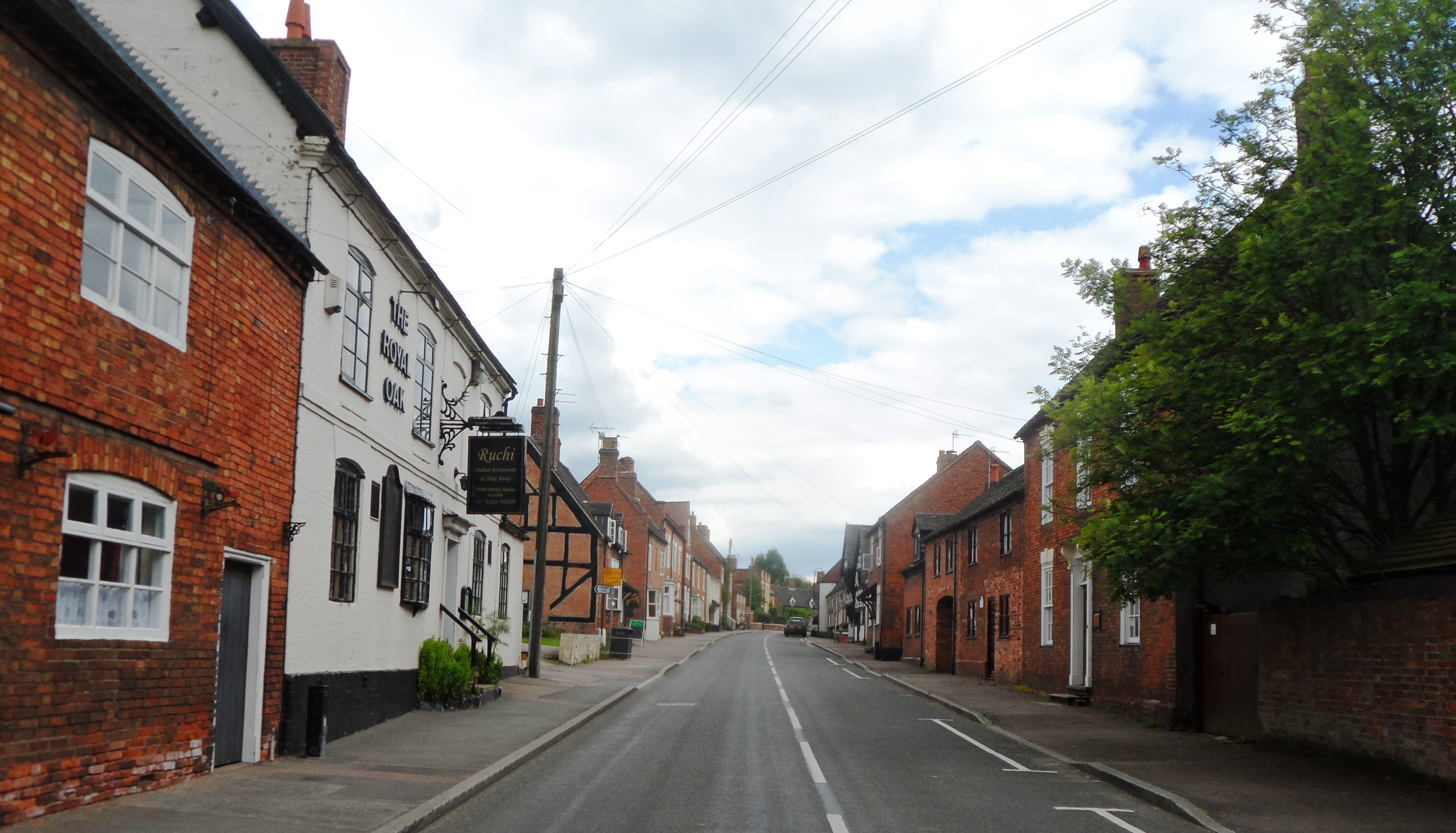
- Bagot Street - Abbots Bromley (2014)

- Location within Staffordshire
- Area: 14.29 sq mi (37.0 km^{2})
- Population: 1,779 (2011)
  - Density: 124/sq mi (48/km^{2})
- OS grid reference: SK080245
  - London: 117.63 mi (189.31 km)
- Civil parish: Abbots Bromley
- District: East Staffordshire
- Shire county: Staffordshire
- Region: West Midlands
- Country: England
- Sovereign state: United Kingdom
- Post town: RUGELEY
- Postcode district: WS15
- Dialling code: 01283
- Police: Staffordshire
- Fire: Staffordshire
- Ambulance: West Midlands
- UK Parliament: Lichfield
- Website: Abbots Bromley Parish Council

Abbots Bromley is a village and civil parish in the East Staffordshire district of Staffordshire and lies approximately 9.8 miles (15.8 km) east of Stafford, England. According to the University of Nottingham English Place-names project, the settlement name Abbots Bromley could mean 'clearing/wood frequented by broom'. The prefix 'abbots' was added because the village was held by Burton Abbey. The population of the civil parish at the 2011 census was 1,779.

Abbots Bromley was rated the best place to live in the Midlands by the Sunday Times in 2013 and again in 2016. The village is a regular entrant and often winner of the Staffordshire Best Kept Village Competition which takes place across the county each year. Originally organised by the Community Council of Staffordshire there is a best-kept village award for a large and small village in each of the county's Districts and Boroughs. Whilst down the years the East Staffordshire district prize has been awarded to Abbots Bromley on a number of occasions the overall county title continues to elude. In August 2017 the village won the double honour of winning both the best kept village and community council trophy award, a double not achieved for many years. This double was repeated again in 2018. In 2019 the competition was taken on by The Community Foundation for Staffordshire and Abbots Bromley won for the third consecutive year. Through the competition Abbots Bromley maintains a healthy rivalry with nearby Yoxall, also a regular winner in the East Staffordshire section.

The village is world-renowned for its annual Horn Dance, an ancient tradition which attracts visitors from far and wide.

== Location ==
The village sits within the Postal Area of the nearby settlement of Rugeley which is the closest town to the village at 6.2 miles (10.0 km) from Abbots Bromley. The village and civil parish lie within the East Staffordshire District. The village is 11.6 miles (18.7 km) north of the city of Lichfield and is 6.8 miles (10.9 km) south west of Uttoxeter. The nearest railway station is at Rugeley which is 5.8 miles (9.3 km) south west of the village. The Blithfield Reservoir is 1.8 miles (2.9 km) from the centre of the village. Within the parish there are the natural features of Bagot's Wood and the largest remaining part of the Needwood Forest. Phil Drabble's Goats Lodge nature reserve is also in the parish. Chaserider hourly bus service 63 links the village to Uttoxeter, Rugeley, Hednesford and Cannock.

== History ==
The first historical record of the village dates from 942, when the manor of "Bromleage" was given to Wulfsige the Black. The will, dated 1002, of Wulfric Spot, Earl of Mercia, gave the village to the Abbey of Burton upon Trent. There is some evidence that the current settlement was a planned town – there is evidence of burgage plots, a grid pattern of streets and a wide market place.

=== Domesday Book ===
Abbas Bromley is recorded in the Domesday Book of 1086–7 as Brunlege, when it was part of the land of St Mary of Burton.

=== Royal Charter ===
In 1227, a weekly market was confirmed by Royal Charter at the site of the Buttercross (recorded in 1339, the present structure said by Pevsner to date from the 17th century), which survives to the present. The current, triangular market place is now grassed over and serves as a village green and the focus for events on Horn Dance Day.

=== Dissolution of the Monasteries ===
The village remained affiliated to the Abbey until the Dissolution of the Monasteries in 1545. Henry VIII gave Bromley Abbatis to Sir William Paget, Clerk of the Signet and Privy Councillor. The village was known as Paget's Bromley for several centuries, (distinguishing it from the part of the parish in the hands of the Bagot family, still known as Bagot's Bromley) but eventually the influence of the Paget family declined, and the name reverted to Abbots Bromley.

=== Industry ===
Despite being an agricultural centre on account of its market and fairs, Abbots Bromley enjoyed some industrial success. In the 16th century it was a major centre for glass manufacture. In 1606 it gained a grammar school, now Richard Clarke First School.

=== Decline ===
Despite nineteenth century efforts to connect the village to the expanding railway network the North Staffordshire Railway received an act of parliament to build a branch line from Stowe-by-Chartley which was never taken advantage of. Abbots Bromley remained comparatively isolated and in decline, losing its market, fairs and economic status.

=== 20th century ===
By the 1950s the village faced economic decay and an ageing population. It was also comparatively late in receiving mains electricity and gas services. More recently it has become a dormitory settlement for surrounding urban areas such as the West Midlands conurbation and Derby. There has been some new development as well as the restoration of historic buildings, with a Millennium Hall perhaps the most noted recent example.

== Parish council ==
Nine parish councillors, elected every four years represent the community. Every year the council elects a chair (currently Richard Love) and vice chair. The parish council is supported by the parish clerk. Meetings are usually held in the village hall at 19:00 on the last Wednesday of every month (except August and December due to holidays). All meetings are open to the public. One parish surgery is also held every other month on a Saturday morning in the Church House to enable parishioners to bring any local issues to the attention of a councillor so that it can be reported to the full parish council meeting. Following the election of new parish councillors in May 2015 the council began the process of developing a neighbourhood plan, administered through a sub-group of the parish council.

=== Other local representation ===
Abbots Bromley is part of the Bagots and Needwood Ward on East Staffordshire Borough Council and is currently represented by three Conservative borough councillors. At county level the village is part of the Needwood Forest Division, represented by Conservative Catherine Brown on Staffordshire County Council. The village is part of the parliamentary constituency of Lichfield and is currently represented by Labour MP Dave Robertson.

== Schools ==
The village is home to The Richard Clarke First School, run by the Uttoxeter Learning Trust for pupils aged 4–9. The school was founded in 1606 via a bequest made by Richard Clarke a local man who achieved success in London in the trade of a dyer. The school was originally known as 'Clarke's Grammar School'. The current school is rated as good by OFSTED with outstanding features. The village is part of the three tier school system, now quite rare in England. From age 9-13 pupils go to Oldfields Hall Middle School in Uttoxeter and then from age 13-16 (or 18 if students opt to stay on in the sixth form) to Thomas Alleyne's High School also in Uttoxeter.

The village was also the home of one of the original Woodard Schools, and the first in the Woodard Group for girls Abbots Bromley School (formerly known as Abbots Bromley School for Girls and before that the School of S. Mary and S. Anne). In 2015 the school opened a new International College on the former St Mary's site. The school closed in July 2019 and the site has been sold. The site has been purchased by a property developer with plans to convert to residential properties.

== Historic buildings ==
The village has a large number of listed buildings, and its historic core has conservation area status, reflecting its pre-industrial townscape. Of these, the half timbered Church House, The Goats Head Inn, which is claimed to be the original town hall, and the Schoolhouse (Richard Clarke's 1606 Grammar School) are some of the most noteworthy. The Market Cross (Buttercross) has been designated a scheduled Ancient Monument.

=== Gallery ===
Listed Buildings in Abbots Bromley

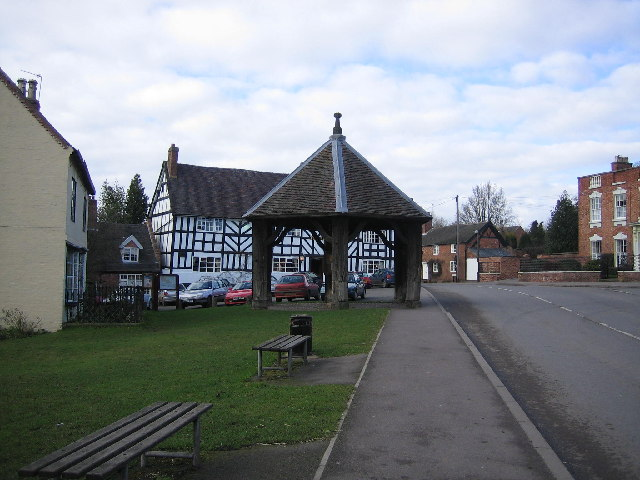
The Butter Cross, A scheduled Ancient Monument.

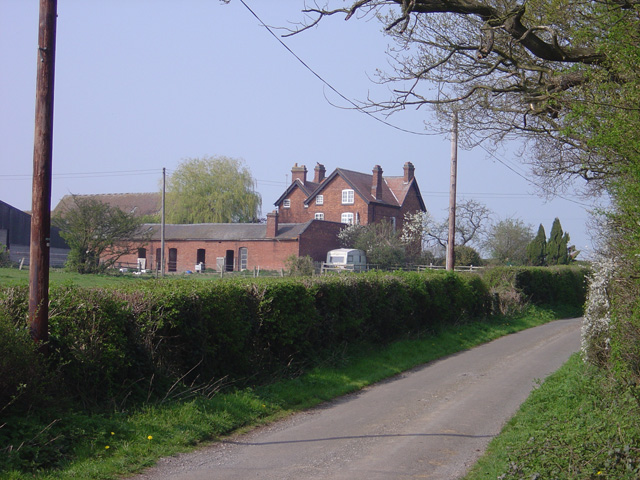
Bentilee Park Farmhouse, Grade II listed

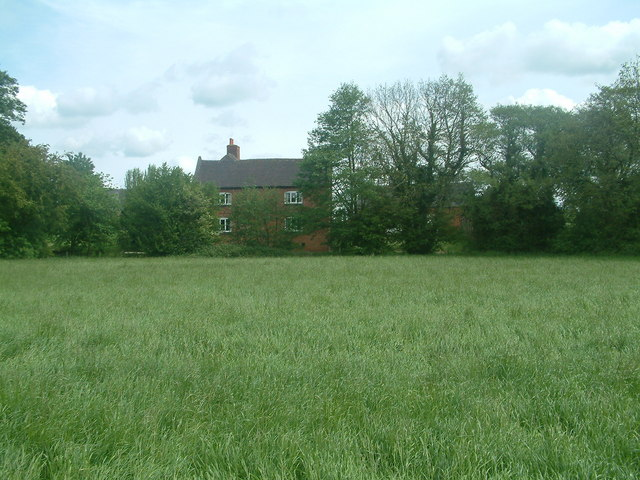
Hurst Farmhouse, Grade II listed

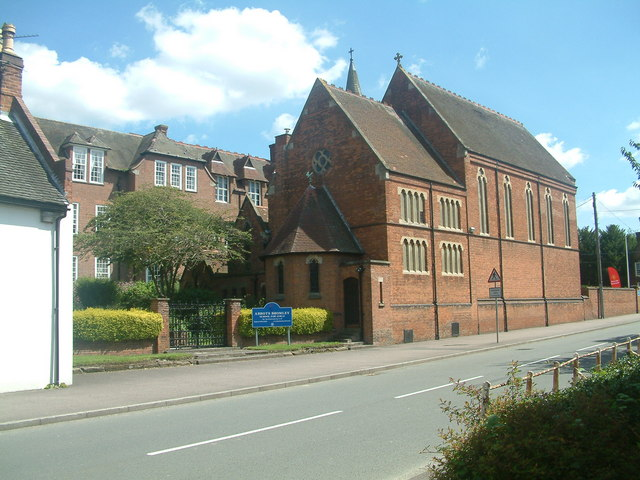
Coleridge House, School of St Mary and St Anne, Grade II listed

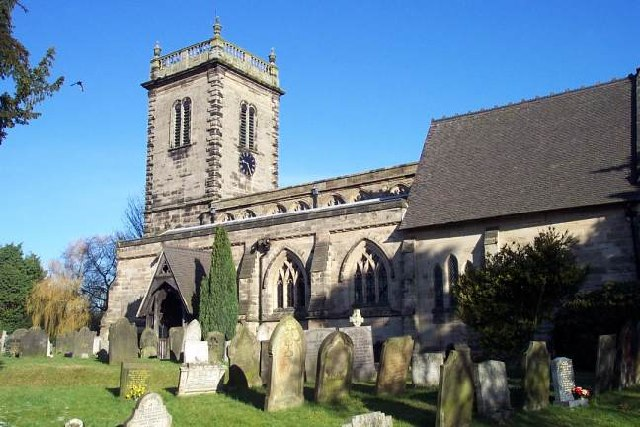
Church of St. Nicholas, Grade II listed

=== Listed Buildings in Abbots Bromley ===
- Dwellings at No's 5, 6, 7, 8, High Street, Grade II, Hall Hill Lane
- Bagot's Bromley Monument, near Bromley Farmhouse, Grade II
- Bank House, Grade II, High Street.
- Barn and Cartshed close to Park Lodge, Grade II.
- Barn in Goose Lane, Grade II.
- Barn, Hurst Farm, Grade II.
- Barn, High Elms Farm, Grade II.
- Batkin House, Harley Lane, Grade II.
- Bentilee Park Farmhouse, Grade II.
- Bromley House, Grade II.
- Cael Cottage, Grade II.
- Cedar Cottage, Grade II.
- Chesterton House, Grade II.
- Saint Nicholas Parish Church, Grade II.
- Church View Farmhouse. Grade II.
- North West Leafields Farm, Associated building and structures. Grade II.
- Coleridge House School, Grade II.
- Croft's House, Grade II.
- Crofts Cottage, Grade II.
- Dandelion Cottages and Associated structures, Grade II.
- Falcott Inglenook, Grade II.
- Georgian House, Grade II,
- Gilleon's Hall, Grade II.
- Goats Lodge, Grade II.
- Granary and Associated structures at Hurst Farmhouse, Grade II,
- Grange Farmhouse, Grade II.
- Narley Farmhouse, Grade II.
- Heatley Green Farmhouse, Grade II.
- Dwelling on Market Place, Grade II.
- Dwelling Owned by Goodwin, Grade II.
- Inglenook Oak Cottage, Grade II.
- Lancsuss House, Grade II.
- Laurel Cottage, Grade II.
- Leacross Cottage, Grade II.
- Leafields Farmhouse, Grade II.
- Lychgate to the parish Church Saint Nicholas, Grade II.
- Manor Farmhouse, Grade II.
- Maxstoke House, Grade II.
- Middleton House, Grade II
- five different Milepost in the parish, Grade II.
- Mount Pleasant Farmhouse, Grade II.
- Norfolk House, Grade II.
- Norman Villa, Grade II.
- Northwood House, Grade II.
- Park Lodge, Grade II.
- Parkside Farmhouse, Grade II.
- Premises of C. Taswell, Grade II.
- Newsagent Premises of J.M. Meadows, grade II.
- Butchers Shop Premises of V.G. Wilson, Grade II.
- Rose House, Grade II.
- Saint Helens, Grade II.
- Assorted structures Bentilee Park Farm, Grade II.
- Assorted structures Leafields Farmhouse, Grade II.
- Sunny Brae and Sunny Mead, Grade II.
- Bagot Almshouses, Grade II.
- Bagot Arms, Grade II.
- Bakery, Grade II.
- Big House, School, Grade II.
- Butter Cross, Grade II.
- St. Mary and St. Anne school, Grade II.
- Coach and Horses Public House, Grade II.
- The Cross, Dwelling, Grade II.
- The Green, Grade II.
- Hurst Farmhouse, Grade II.
- The Maltings, Dwelling, Grade II.
- Old Schoolhouse, Grade II.
- Royal Oak Public House, Grade II.
- Town End Farmhouse, Grade II.
- Gilleon's Hall, Associated structures. Grade II.
- War Memorial, Grade II.
- Wheelwright House, Grade II.

== Traditions ==
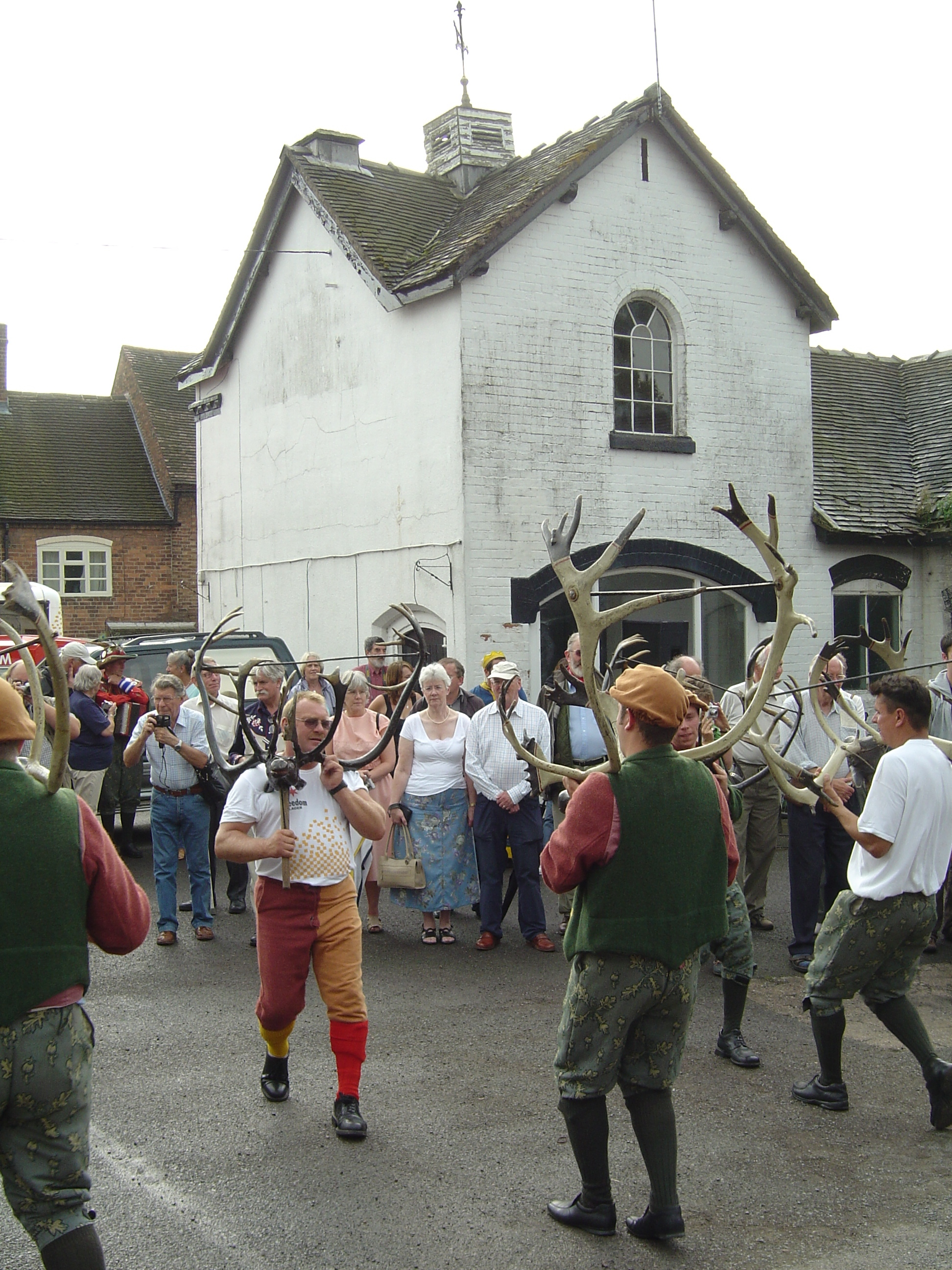
The Horn Dance outside the Bagot Arms in 2006

=== The Horn Dance ===
Abbots Bromley is known for its annual Horn Dance, an English folk dance dating back to the Middle Ages. The modern version of the dance involves reindeer antlers, a hobby horse, Maid Marian, and a Fool. The dance takes place on Wakes Monday, the day following Wakes Sunday, which is the first Sunday after 4 September. It begins in the morning on the village green and passes to Blithfield Hall, returning to the village in the early afternoon with the dancers then making their way around the pubs and houses, eventually finishing with a service of Compline at the church.

== Sport and leisure ==
=== Cricket ===
Abbots Bromley Cricket Club is an English amateur cricket club with a history of cricket in the village dating back to 1881. The club ground is based on Mill Green Lane. Abbots Bromley CC have 2 Saturday senior XI teams that compete in the Derbyshire County Cricket League, a Sunday XI team, and a junior training section that play competitive cricket in the Burton & District Youth Cricket League.

=== Football ===
Abbots Bromley has a men's senior football team, Abbots Bromley FC, nicknamed 'The Stags'. They were reformed after over 10 years in 2010. They compete in division 2 of the Stafford & District league and play home games at the Abbots Bromley School grounds named 'The Lowers'. The Stags main sponsors are Gallery 3, The Room Network & Edwin Ferneyhough Vehicle Sales. The president of the club is former Aston Villa and Stoke City footballer, Harry Burrows.

The club reached the Uttoxeter & District division 2/3 cup final in May 2012 but narrowly lost to Cheadle Town End on penalties in front of a crowd of 150+. The Stags also narrowly missed out on promotion to the Uttoxeter & District first division in 2012 after finishing third. The Stags were finally promoted to division 1 the following year and completed the double by winning the Subsidiary Cup after beating The Three Tuns FC in the final 4-1 at the Oldfield sports ground, Uttoxeter. The Subsidiary Cup win was repeated in 2017 when a 6-2 victory against Stone Town FC at Abbots Bromley School saw Will Ferneyhough score five goals.

The club remained in division 1 until 2018, a campaign that ended in relegation. The following season saw a second placed finish and promotion, narrowly losing out by a point to Doveridge FC as well as a 2-1 Division 2 League Cup final victory over Doveridge FC at Hillsfield, Rocester FC in front of over 200 spectators.

The club's committee voted to transfer to the Stafford & District League for the 2019-20 season and started out in the third tier (Division 2).

=== Netball ===
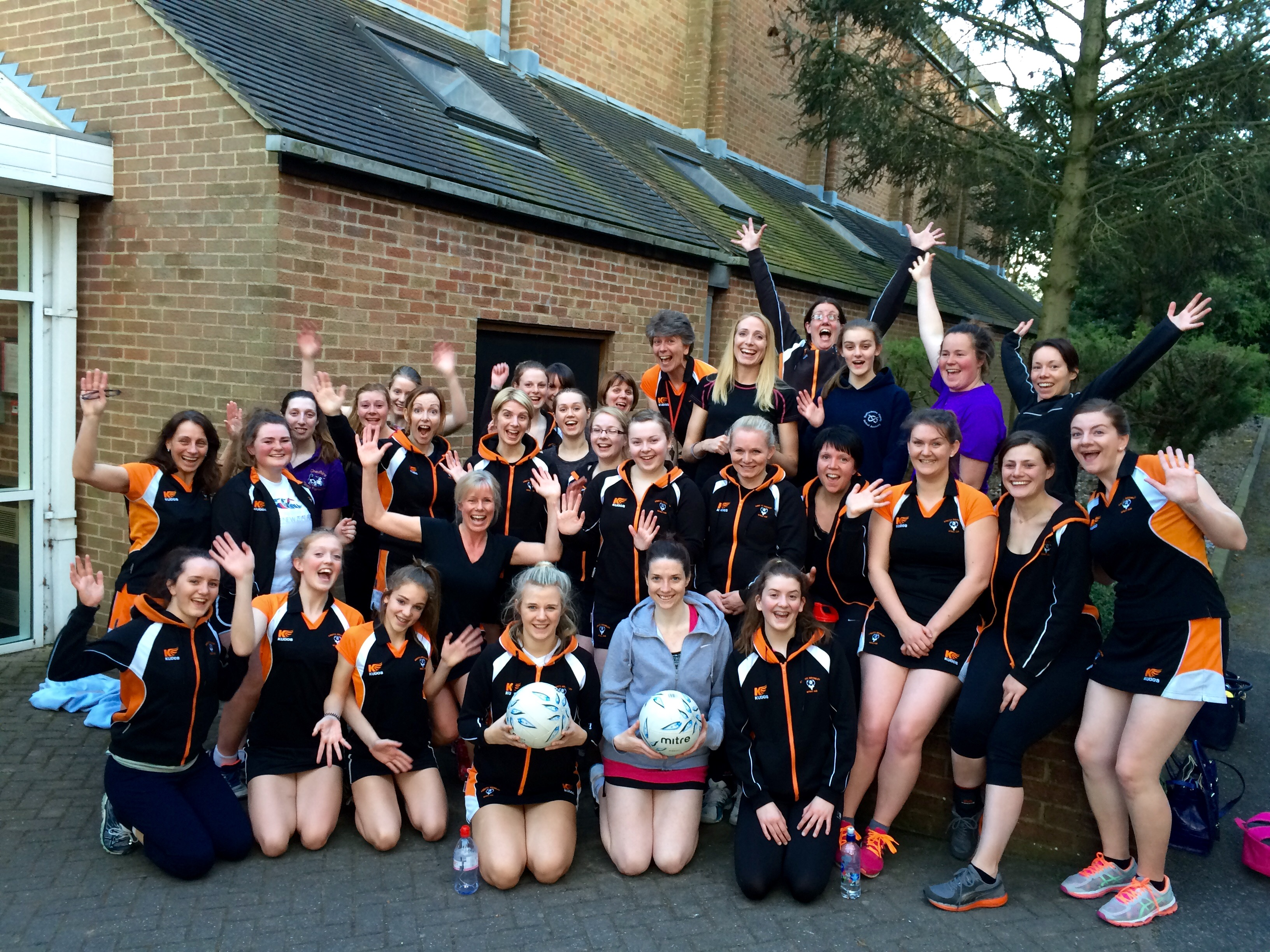
Abbots Bromley Netball Club (2016)

Abbots Bromley Netball Club is affiliated to England Netball with a Bronze CAPS status through the Sport England Clubmark scheme and consists of players of all ages from Abbots Bromley and surrounding areas. The club uses the training and playing facilities at Abbots Bromley School, and field up to 3 squads in the Burton and District league.

=== Tennis ===
Abbots Bromley Tennis Club was founded in 1913 and has two outdoor courts situated behind the Village Hall, off Bagot Street.

== Notable people ==
- Alice Mary Coleridge (1846–1907) a British promoter of girls' schools. founded Abbots Bromley School for Girls
- Stephen Smith (1874 in Abbots Bromley – 1935) an England international footballer, he played 162 games for Aston Villa
- Phil Drabble OBE (1914 – 2007 in Abbots Bromley) countryman, author and TV presenter. He created a local nature reserve and also lived in and wrote about the countryside of north Worcestershire.
- Philip Lawley (1927 in Abbots Bromley – 2011) chemist, demonstrated that DNA damage was the base cause of cancer
- Harry Burrows (born 1941) footballer who played 420 games, mainly for Aston Villa and Stoke City. He lived locally on retirement and is the president of Abbots Bromley Stags

== See also ==
- Listed buildings in Abbots Bromley
