= Robert Woodard =

Robert Woodard may refer to:

- Sir Robert Woodard (Royal Navy officer) (born 1939), commander of the Royal Yacht Britannia
  - Sir Robert Woodard Academy, Lancing, West Sussex, England
- Robert Woodard II (born 1999), American basketball player
- Robert Woodard (baseball) (born 1985), American baseball coach and pitcher
