= Peterborough High School =

Peterborough High School may refer to:

- The Peterborough School, an independent school in Peterborough, England, formerly known as Peterborough High School.
- St John Fisher Catholic High School (Peterborough), a Catholic school in Peterborough, England.
- Peterborough Collegiate and Vocational School, a public high school in Peterborough, Ontario, Canada.
