= Denstone =

Village in Staffordshire, England

Coordinates: 52.965°N 1.856°W

- Location within Staffordshire
- Population: 1,151 (2021)
- OS grid reference: SK097408
- District: East Staffordshire
- Shire county: Staffordshire
- Region: West Midlands
- Country: England
- Sovereign state: United Kingdom
- Post town: UTTOXETER
- Postcode district: ST14
- Dialling code: 01889
- Police: Staffordshire
- Fire: Staffordshire
- Ambulance: West Midlands
- UK Parliament: Burton

Denstone is a village and civil parish situated between the towns of Uttoxeter in East Staffordshire and Ashbourne in Derbyshire. It is located next to the River Churnet. The village has a church, village hall, primary school and a pub. The nearest railway station is at Uttoxeter for the Crewe to Derby line and the nearest airport is East Midlands Airport.

== History ==
The All Saints village church, vicarage and original schoolhouse were built by Sir Thomas Percival Heywood, 2nd Baronet in the mid 19th century. All Saints CE primary school moved to a new site in the village in the late 1990's and the original schoolhouse, located next to the church, was converted to a residential dwelling. Denstone College, a fee-paying private school founded by Nathaniel Woodard was established in 1868 and is situated to the west of the village. It is still a member of the Woodard Schools group.

In 1873, Denstone Railway Station opened on the now-disused Churnet Valley Line, owned and operated by North Staffordshire Railway (NSR). The line served as a connection between North Rode and Uttoxeter. The station closed on 4 January 1965 and the platforms are still in place. The section of line running north from the former level crossing on College Road is now accessible for walkers and cyclists, linking Denstone with Alton (2.6 miles, 4.2 km) and Oakamoor (4.4 miles, 7.1 km). Other parts of this railway line are now preserved as the Churnet Valley Railway. It is hoped that one day the line would extend back beyond the village station site via Oakamoor, but this is unlikely due to the large number of buildings near the railway.

There is a war memorial in the centre of the village, on the junction of College Road and Oak Road.

The present Lord of the manor of Denstone is Daniel J. Barton, stepson of the late Clifford Bailey.

== Local economy ==
The world headquarters of heavy equipment manufacturer JCB is located to the south of the village. The village pub, The Tavern, is owned by Marstons Brewery.

Alton Towers Resort, a popular amusement park with hotels and indoor water park is located 3.6 miles (5.8 km) from Denstone. Visitors to the park travelling from the M1 (via the A50) and M6 will typically pass through the village to reach the resort.

== Climate ==
Climate data for Denstone (1991–2020)
Month	Jan	Feb	Mar	Apr	May	Jun	Jul	Aug	Sep	Oct	Nov	Dec	Year
Mean daily maximum °C (°F)	6.6 (43.9)	7.3 (45.1)	9.5 (49.1)	12.7 (54.9)	15.6 (60.1)	18.5 (65.3)	20.8 (69.4)	20.2 (68.4)	17.4 (63.3)	13.4 (56.1)	9.4 (48.9)	6.9 (44.4)	13.2 (55.8)
Daily mean °C (°F)	3.9 (39.0)	4.2 (39.6)	6.0 (42.8)	8.4 (47.1)	11.2 (52.2)	14.0 (57.2)	16.2 (61.2)	15.8 (60.4)	13.2 (55.8)	9.8 (49.6)	6.5 (43.7)	4.2 (39.6)	9.5 (49.1)
Mean daily minimum °C (°F)	1.1 (34.0)	1.2 (34.2)	2.4 (36.3)	4.2 (39.6)	6.7 (44.1)	9.6 (49.3)	11.7 (53.1)	11.5 (52.7)	9.0 (48.2)	6.3 (43.3)	3.6 (38.5)	1.5 (34.7)	5.8 (42.4)
Average precipitation mm (inches)	77.8 (3.06)	67.2 (2.65)	62.1 (2.44)	60.6 (2.39)	56.0 (2.20)	73.0 (2.87)	65.0 (2.56)	74.9 (2.95)	66.1 (2.60)	88.8 (3.50)	82.6 (3.25)	92.8 (3.65)	866.8 (34.13)
Average precipitation days (≥ 1.0 mm)	13.9	12.1	11.7	10.8	10.3	10.8	11.6	11.1	11.1	13.2	14.5	14.7	145.9
Mean monthly sunshine hours	48.2	72.3	109.1	147.5	178.3	173.3	184.9	178.2	125.0	88.5	53.0	48.9	1,407.2
Source: Met Office

== Notable people ==
- David Edwards, second Millionaire winner on Who wants to be a Millionaire?

== See also ==
- Listed buildings in Denstone
