= Kings Priory School =

Location
- Huntington Place; Tynemouth, Tyne and Wear, NE30 4RF; England; 55.017°N 1.427°W

Information
- Type: Academy
- Motto: Latin: Moribus Civilis (Civilised Behaviour)
- Religious affiliation: Church of England
- Established: 2013; 1860 (King's School, Tynemouth)
- Department for Education URN: 139658 Tables
- Ofsted: Reports
- Principal: Philip Sanderson
- Staff: 119
- Gender: Coeducational
- Age: 4 to 18
- Enrolment: 1200 (approx.)
- Houses: Provost; Hotspur; Dunelm; Barfleur
- Colours: Red, Gold and Navy
- Former pupils: King's Tynemouth Alumni
- Affiliation: Woodard Schools
- Website: www.kingsprioryschool.co.uk

Kings Priory School is a coeducational all-through school and sixth form located in Tynemouth, Tyne and Wear, England. The school has a Christian foundation as the largest member of the Woodard Corporation, but accepts pupils of any religious background. It is located immediately to the east of Tynemouth Metro Station.

The school was founded in 1860 and in 1865 became known as Tynemouth School and was originally situated in the old headmaster's house, now Tynemouth House, which continues to be used for conferences and teaching. Later the name 'The King's School, Tynemouth' was used. Previously a fee-charging private school, The King's School converted to academy status in September 2013, merging with the Priory Primary school in Tynemouth and was renamed Kings Priory School. It remains a member of the Woodard Corporation but is now state-funded.

== History ==
Coat of Arms of The King's School Tynemouth, granted 30th October 1961

The school was founded in Jarrow in 1860, but by 1865 had moved to its present site in Tynemouth. The school originally provided private education for local boys as Tynemouth School: the school did not become known as The King's School until the 1960s. The school's name is in reference to the three ancient kings buried at Tynemouth Priory: Oswin, Osred II and Malcolm III. Consequently, there are many student myths as to the position of the apostrophe in the name (King's, rather than Kings'). The school grew considerably in size during the second half of the 20th century and began to admit girls to both the Kindergarten and the Sixth Form during that time. The school became fully coeducational and part comprehensive in 1996, following the initial decision in 1992.

King's originally occupied a large house on Huntington Place and the adjoining terraces. This was later extended with the addition of the Nicholson Building (Nicholson's) in the 1920s, and the Ellison Block (Ellison's) in the 1960s. Further expansion occurred in 1991 with the addition of the design, technology and art block (the Provost building.) This continued in 1999 with the addition of the Chapter Building, comprising many new classrooms, along with the lecture theatre and 700-seat King's Hall. In 2008, the school continued its development with the addition of the Oswin's building. The building houses a new sports hall, dance studio, drama workshop, indoor climbing centre, a music school with recording studio, a cafeteria and all-day coffee bar, new Sixth Form study centre and social space, a new library and classrooms for English learning support, French, Spanish and PE. The building replaced the former music school, gym, changing rooms and cafeteria.

In 2013, the Woodard Corporation announced that King's would merge with the neighbourghing state run Priory Primary School to become a state funded Academy. This caused some controversy in the local community. The local authority, North Tyneside Council, strongly opposed the scheme and on 17 July 2013, issued a letter to the Secretary of State for Education asking that the decision be reconsidered. However the school converted to academy status in September 2013 and was renamed Kings Priory School.

Principal David Dawes was asked to leave by Woodard Academy Trust after a single term in 2013, due to "vision differences". In November 2025, the school closed briefly due to a "potential critical threat", which Northumbria Police confirmed was a malicious communication, but which was deemed not credible.

Postcard showing the headmaster's house, c. 1910

== Chapters ==
King Priory has a long-standing House System, which has continued into the new school in the "Chapter" format. All pupils are assigned to a house upon entry to the school; Provost, Hotspur, Barfleur, and Dunelm.

House	Abbr.	House colours
Barfleur	B	Yellow
Dunelm	D	Red
Hotspur	H	Green
Provost	P	Blue

Traditionally, pupils were assigned to a house depending on their area of home residence, however this practice has become more flexible in recent years. Pupils who are relations of current or former pupils are normally assigned to the same house as their predecessors.

House colours appear on school ties for all members of the senior school. In place of the school colours (red, gold and navy), the gold stripe is replaced with the pupil's house colour (e.g. red, navy and light blue for members of Provost). This practice is not continued in the Sixth Form, where students wear either a navy blue tie emblazoned with the school crest (Sixth Form) or a red tie with gold and blue stripes, similarly emblazoned with the crest (Prefects).

The house names are all linked to the area that they represent: Barfleur was the name of Admiral Collingwood's ship in The Glorious First of June, and his statue stands in Tynemouth; Dunelm is Latin for Durham and so represents those from south of the river tyne; Hotspur refers to Harry Hotspur, a Newcastle medieval military hero. Provost is the exception, being named for the Provost of the Woodard Corporation.

The House Challenge Trophy takes place each year, with pupils competing in sporting, musical and general knowledge events.

== Spirituality ==
The school has an Anglican tradition as a member of the Woodard Corporation. Every year group attends a morning service in the school chapel each week. Communion is open to pupils, former pupils, staff and parents, and is held twice each term. The school no longer has a chaplain.

== Extra Curricular Activities ==
=== Music ===
The school has a strong emphasis on music. They have all-school assemblies which focus on singing, alongside extra-curricular music lessons, an orchestra, a choir, choristers, the "klarinos", a clarinet group, and a soul band. Until 2017, they had a string orchestra. There are regular school concerts and open-mic nights.

=== Drama ===
There is a designated drama studio and this activity, as well as the recently constructed Kings Hall. Each year there is senior play and musical and the Junior School and Kindergarten hold two productions each year. Students from all year groups are able to take individual speech and drama lessons and take the LAMDA examinations.

=== Sport and societies ===
Each year group in the Senior School has one afternoon of games per week. Sports taught at the school include rugby, cricket, tennis, hockey, athletics, and swimming. In recent years several pupils have represented their country. Other sports include basketball, volleyball, gymnastics, trampolining, and cross country running. The school's coastal location, together with its on-site facilities and access to nearby Prior's Park provide a range of opportunity for sport and recreation. In the cricket season, most school cricket games are played at Tynemouth Cricket Club.

Alongside provision for The Duke of Edinburgh's Award, several other clubs and societies exist, including the school newspaper and chess. A number of activities take place at the school's Field Centre outpost at Alnham in the Northumberland National Park.

== Giuseppe Garibaldi ==
The 19th-century Italian patriot Giuseppe Garibaldi sailed into Tynemouth on 21 March 1854 and is reported to have stayed at Tynemouth House whilst in exile. During his stay, he held a meeting at the house with British political and industrial leaders and addressed them on his plans for a unified Italy. His portrait was painted on this visit and this is now held in a Garibaldi museum in Sardinia. An English Heritage plaque on the outside wall of the school commemorates his visit, and the room where he is purported to have slept—now a teaching conference room—is named the Garibaldi Room.

== Notable former pupils and staff ==
- Stan Laurel, comic actor, writer and film director
- Peter Cadogan, writer and activist
- Rod Clements, bass player for the band Lindisfarne
- Toby Flood, England, Newcastle Falcons and Leicester Tigers rugby player
- Jason Plato, racing driver
- Lewis Atkinson, MP for Sunderland Central
- Harry Vaulkhard, racing driver
- Shirley Webb, sportswoman and Gladiator from UK 2008 series.
- Henry Treece, poet and writer, who taught at the school from 1935 to 1938
- David Laidler, Economist, scholar of monetarism
- Imran Shah, cricketer
- Emily Richards, swimmer.
