= Denstone College =

Public school in Staffordshire, England

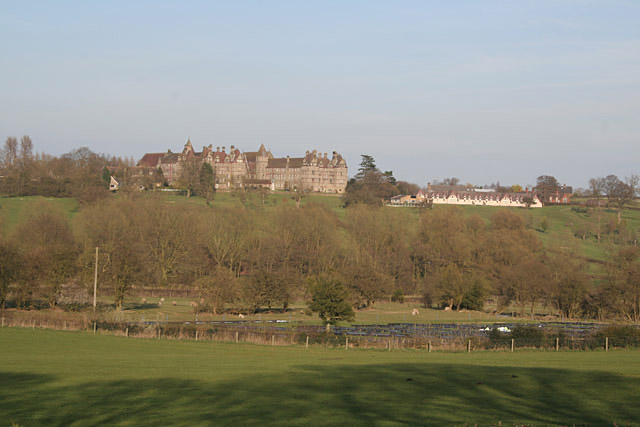

Location
- Denstone; Uttoxeter, Staffordshire, ST14 5HN; England; 52.959613°N 1.868062°W

Information
- Type: Private, boarding and day school
- Motto: Latin: Lignvm crvcis arbor scientiae (The wood of the cross is the tree of knowledge)
- Religious affiliation: Church of England
- Established: 1868; 158 years ago
- Founder: Nathaniel Woodard
- Local authority: Staffordshire County Council
- Oversight: Woodard Schools
- Department for Education URN: 124473 Tables
- Head teacher: Lotte Tulloch
- Gender: Mixed
- Age range: 4-18
- Enrolment: 748
- Houses: Heywood; Philips; Shrewsbury; Meynell; Woodard; Selwyn; Lowe; Lonsdale
- Affiliation: Headmasters' and Headmistresses' Conference
- Alumni: Old Denstonians
- Website: www.denstonecollege.org

Denstone College is a co-educational, private, boarding and day school in Denstone, Uttoxeter, Staffordshire, England. It is a Woodard School, having been founded by Nathaniel Woodard, and so Christian traditions are practised as part of college life. It is a member of the Headmasters' and Headmistresses' Conference.

== History ==
Nathaniel Woodard founded the school, originally called St Chad's College, as his flagship school in the Midlands, following earlier foundations in southern England. Work on the school began in 1868 and it opened in 1873 with 46 boys, under the direction of Edward Clarke Lowe, provost of the Midland district of the Woodard Corporation. The buildings were designed by William Slater and Richard Carpenter in the Neo-Gothic style. The school buildings, hall, chapel and war memorial are all Grade II listed.

The school's chapel was built in 1879–87 by Carpenter and Benjamin Ingelow in a late 13th-century Gothic style; it consists of a four-bay nave with a polygonal apse. Land for the school was given by Sir Thomas Percival Heywood who owned the nearby Riverside Doveleys mansion. Sir Thomas was the school's first bursar. The war memorial, representing St George, stands in the Lonsdale quadrangle and was unveiled in 1925. The design was by Sir Aston Webb and Son and the sculptor Alfred Drury. In the chapel is the provost’s Cross (an processional iron cross carried before the provost on formal occasions) which was a gift to the college by Pope Shenouda III, The Coptic Pope of Alexandria in Egypt.

Day boys and girls were admitted in 1976, with girls’ boarding launched in two houses in 1981. A Royal and Ancient-accredited nine-hole golf course was opened in 1992, a new sports hall in 2000 and the schoolroom was completely refurbished as a modern theatre in 2003. A purpose-built music school and additional classrooms were completed in 2010. A further classroom block and the new sports pavilion and complex were completed in 2012, followed by a new library in 2014 and a university-style extension to girls boarding accommodation. The most recent addition to the school is the new languages and maths classroom block, titled "The Derbyshire Building", completed in 2017.

The school is divided into the following houses, named after the founders and benefactors of the school: Heywood, Philips, Shrewsbury, Meynell, Woodard and Selwyn. Previously, there were two other houses, Lonsdale and Lowe, which were closed but have since been reopened. These were also named after benefactors of the school.

== Preparatory School ==
Denstone College opened a preparatory school in 1902, which moved in 1938 to Smallwood Manor, Marchington Woodlands. From 1959 to 1964 the headmaster was W. P. C. Davies. The school became co-educational and opened a pre-school department in 1983. It also provided boarding accommodation until 1997 but now is a day school for ages 2–11.

In 2021 the preparatory school moved back to Denstone College and is now located in the former Classroom Block. It is now known as The Prep at Denstone College.

== Expedition to Inaccessible Island ==
Denstone College is noted for carrying out the most extensive scientific exploration of Inaccessible Island, an extinct volcano in the South Atlantic. A group of 16 teachers and pupils led by Michael Swales (then Head of Biology), sailed to the island, landing on 25 October 1982 and remained on the island until 9 February 1983, apart from an excursion to the island of Tristan da Cunha at Christmas. The members of the expedition managed to ring 3,000 birds during their stay on the island, and 17 research papers were produced. The hut that they built at Blenden Hall on the island was demolished in 2000.

== Film location ==
The exterior of the school was used as a location for the convent where Novice Joyce Fuddle lived for episode 4 of the 1985 BBC comedy series Happy Families.

Denstone College also hosted Andrew "Freddie" Flintoff with the BBC for the tv show 'Freddie Flintoff's Field of Dreams'. The College fielded a team to take on Freddie's team which was featured on TV.

Also an episode of Peak Practice was filmed on the grounds using pupils from the rugby team. Series 3 episode 7, 14 March 1995. "Will's son is seriously injured on the school rugby field, while Jack returns from Africa and barely has chance to unpack before he is called out to an attempted death." The filming was done on the rugby fields at Denstone College.

== Masters ==
Notable staff

- David Edwards, former physics teacher at the school who was the first man to win a million pounds on the UK version of Who Wants to be a Millionaire?
- Arthur Calder-Marshall, novelist and essayist, schoolmaster 1931–1933.

Headmasters

- 1875–78 W. Bedell Stanford (died 1929)
- 1879–1903 D. Edwardes (died 1916)
- 1903–05 J. Ll. Dove
- 1905–19 F. A. Hibbert
- 1919–31 Roy M. Grier
- 1931– T. A. Moxon
- -1967 Barry Trapnell

== See also ==
- Listed buildings in Denstone
