= Brighton and Hove built-up area =

Coordinates: 50.824°N 0.335°W

Brighton and Hove Built-up Area
- Conurbation
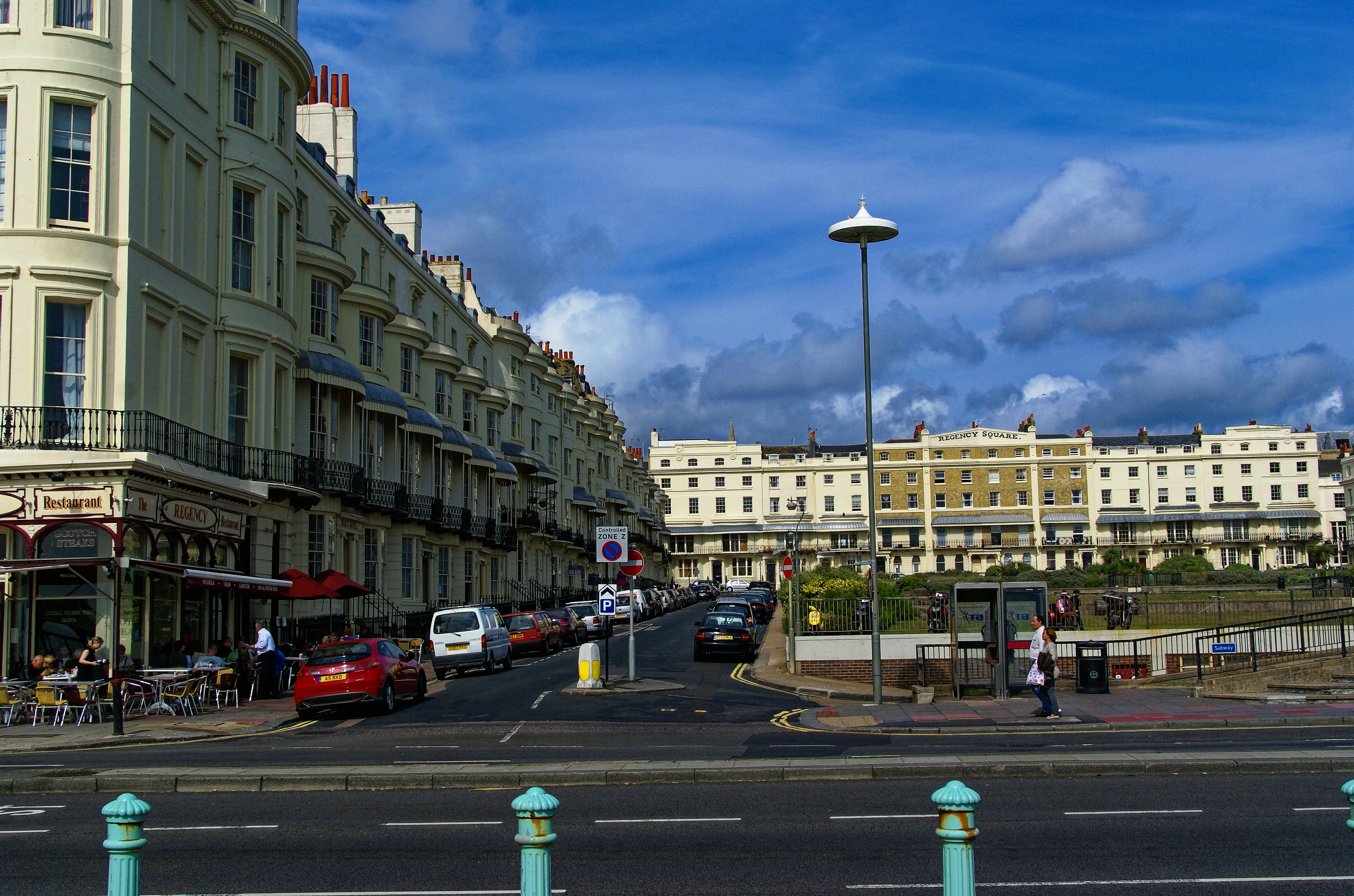
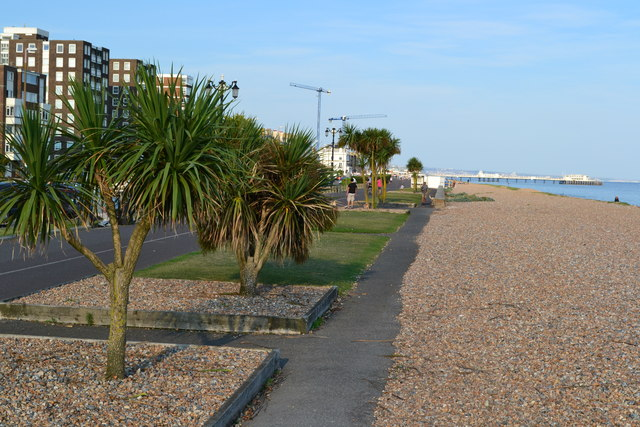
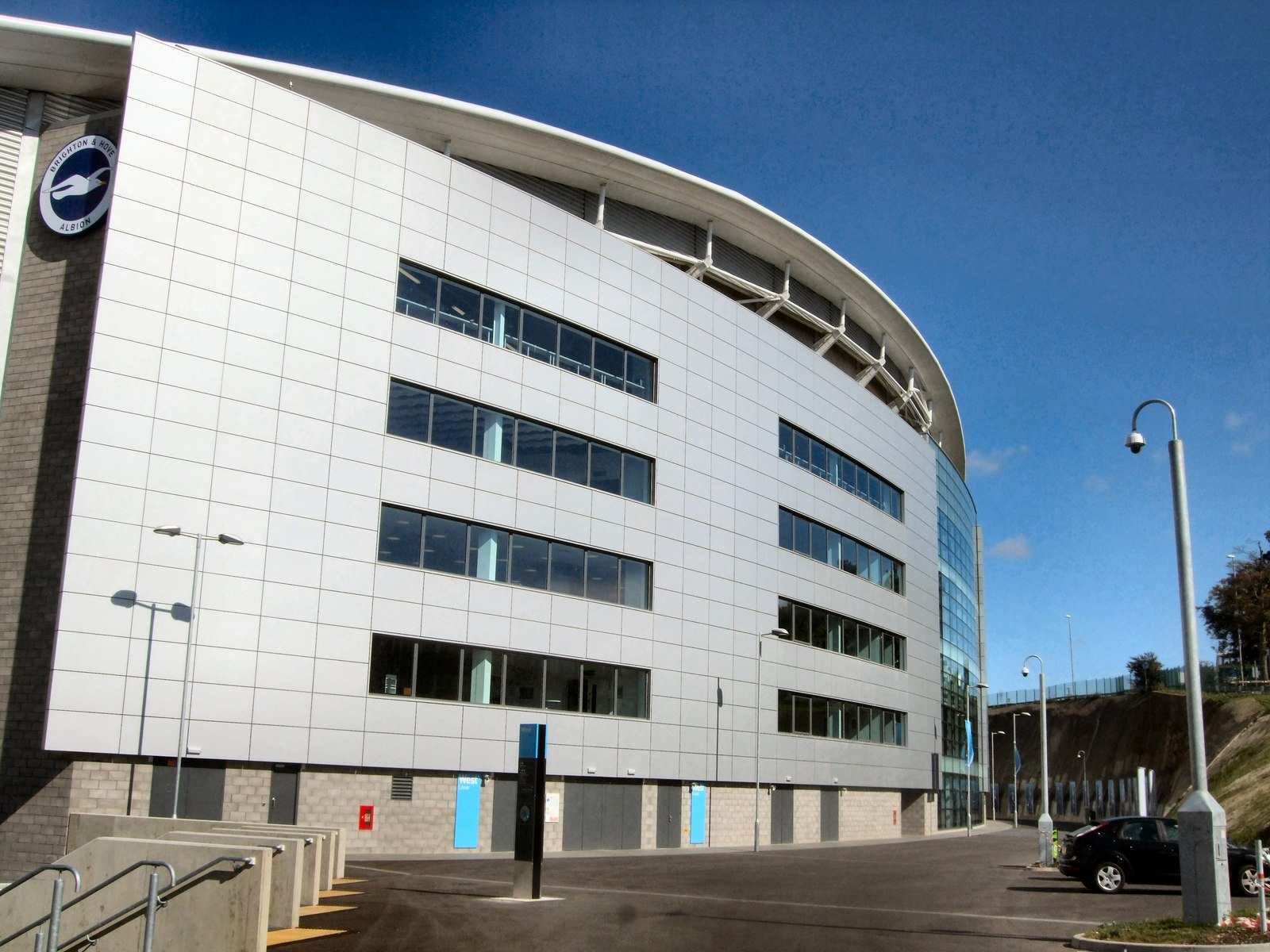
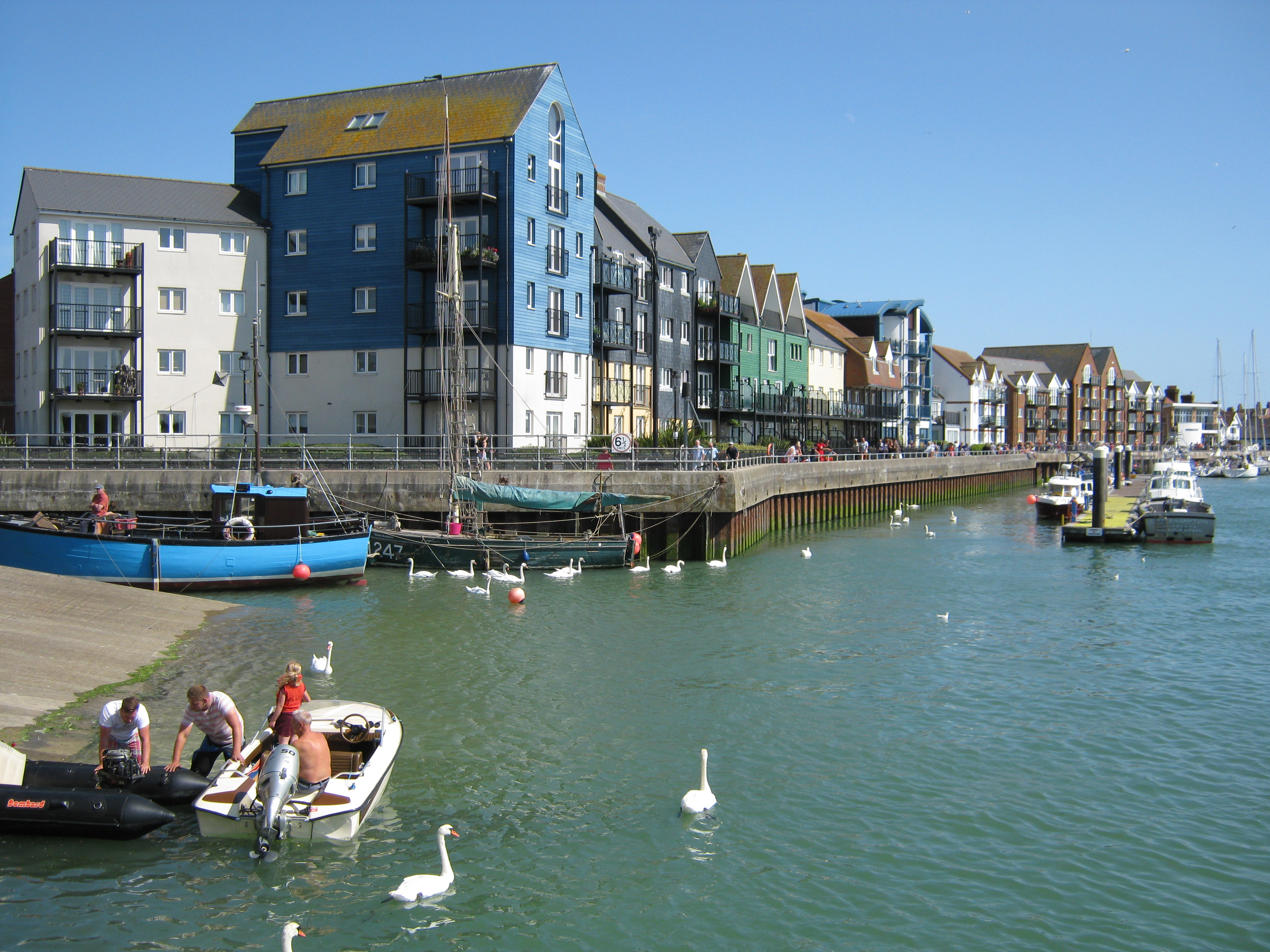
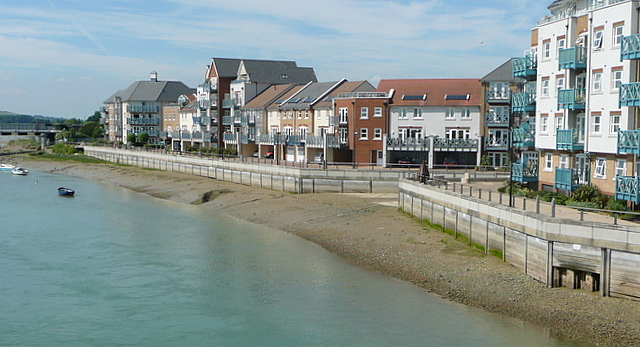
- Clockwise from top: Brighton Regency Square, Worthing Seafront, Littlehampton Harbour, the River Adur at Shoreham and the Falmer Stadium

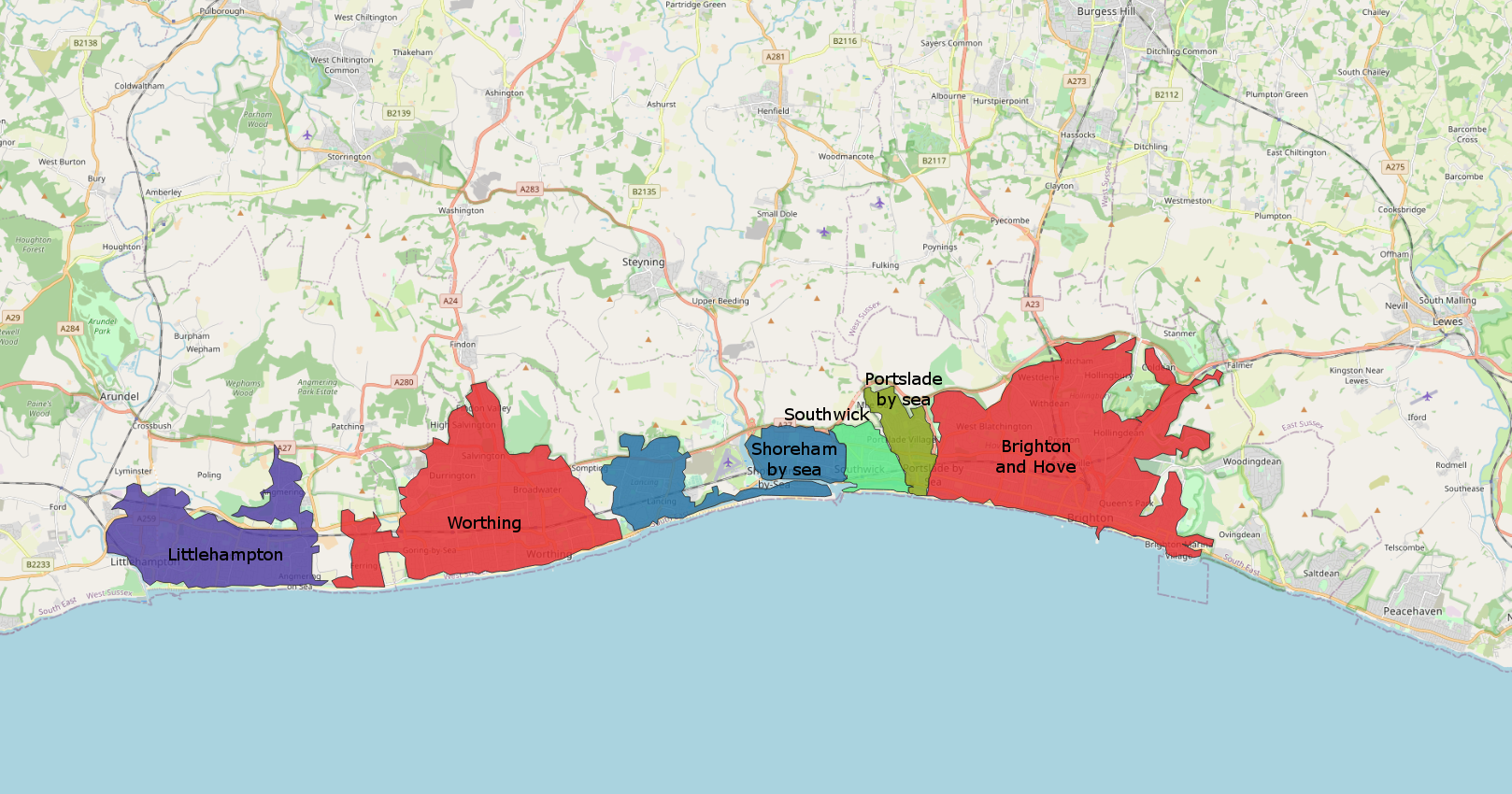
- Map of the Brighton and Hove Built-up Area with labelled subdivisions
- Sovereign state: United Kingdom
- Constituent country: England
- Historic county: Sussex
- Ceremonial county: East Sussex; West Sussex
- Largest settlements: (Pop. 100,000+): Brighton and Hove; Worthing

Population (2011 census)
  - Total: 474,485
  - Rank: 12th
  - Density: 13,740/sq mi (5,304/km^{2})
- Time zone: UTC+0 (GMT)
  - Summer (DST): UTC+1 (BST)
- Postcode: BN
- Area codes: 01273, 01903

The Brighton and Hove Built-up area or Brighton / Worthing / Littlehampton conurbation has a population of 474,485 (2011 census), making it England's 12th largest conurbation. This was an increase of around 3% from the 2001 population of 461,181. Named the Brighton/Worthing/Littlehampton conurbation by the Office for National Statistics for the 2001 census and Brighton and Hove Built-up area for the 2011 census, the area has also been known as Greater Brighton, although the Greater Brighton City Region that was created in 2014 from seven local authorities in Sussex covers a much larger area. The conurbation dominates West and East Sussex, with around one in three of Sussex's population living within its boundaries. It is also the second largest conurbation in the South East region of England and the second largest conurbation on the English Channel coast, in either England or France. In both of these cases the Brighton conurbation trails the Southampton and Portsmouth conurbation. The Brighton/Worthing/Littlehampton conurbation was the largest on the Channel before Portsmouth and Southampton's conurbations were combined for much official data analysis after the 2011 census.

This conurbation is also the UK's most densely populated major conurbation outside London with 5,304 inhabitants per square kilometre (13,740/sq mi). This is due to its tight boundaries between the South Downs national park to the north, and the English Channel to the south together with less land devoted to domestic gardens in English seaside towns than in inland towns.

It is a multi-centred conurbation and the eastern part, the city of Brighton and Hove, has approximately half of its population.

== Places in the conurbation ==
The total distance in a straight line from the western edge of Littlehampton to the eastern edge of Saltdean is between 23 and 24 miles (37 and 39 km). Along the shore or by road, it is slightly further.

The conurbation's population is made up of the following settlements as defined by the Office for National Statistics:

Urban subdivision	Population (2001 census)	Population (2011 census)
Brighton	134,293	229,700
Hove	72,335	229,700
Worthing	96,964	109,120
Littlehampton	55,716	55,706
Shoreham	17,537	48,487
Sompting/Lancing	30,360	48,487
Portslade	19,564	19,921
Southwick	11,281	11,551
Findon	1,720	
Rottingdean/Saltdean	21,411	

Notes:

- Hove and Brighton were separate subdivisions for the 2001 census but are combined in one Brighton and Hove subdivision for the 2011 census.
- In the 2011 census the Shoreham subdivision includes Sompting and Lancing.
- Findon was not included as part of the Brighton and Hove built-up area for the 2011 census.
- Saltdean and Rottingdean were not included as part of the Brighton and Hove built-up area for the 2011 census and instead form a built-up area called Saltdean/Woodingdean with a population of 22,729.
- In the 2001 census the Littlehampton subdivision included Angmering and Ferring. In the 2011 census the Littlehampton subdivision still includes Angmering but Ferring is part of the Worthing subdivision.

There are some small gaps that help maintain distinct identities of places in the conurbation, although in places the settlements coalesce:

- Goring Gap between Ferring and Goring/Worthing
- Sompting Gap between Worthing and Sompting
- Brooklands Park between Worthing and Lancing
- Lancing Gap between Lancing and Shoreham

== Nearby places ==
Settlements very close to the conurbation but not included in the official statistics include the towns of Peacehaven and Telscombe (separated from Brighton by Telscombe Tye, a small open space, population 23,000), Newhaven (joined to Peacehaven, population 11,000) and Seaford (separated from Newhaven by the River Ouse, population 22,000).

== Climate ==
The coastal towns of Sussex with neighbouring Hampshire and south Kent including the settlements that make up the Brighton and Hove built-up area are the sunniest places in the United Kingdom. The coast has consistently more sunshine than the inland areas: sea breezes, blowing off the sea, tend to clear any cloud from the coast. The sunshine average is approximately 1,900 hours a year; this is much higher than the UK average of 1,340 hours a year.

Climate data for Brighton
Month	Jan	Feb	Mar	Apr	May	Jun	Jul	Aug	Sep	Oct	Nov	Dec	Year
Mean daily maximum °C (°F)	8 (46)	8 (46)	9 (49)	12 (53)	16 (60)	19 (66)	22 (71)	22 (72)	18 (65)	15 (59)	11 (52)	9 (48)	14 (57)
Mean daily minimum °C (°F)	3 (38)	3 (38)	4 (40)	6 (43)	9 (48)	12 (53)	14 (58)	14 (58)	12 (54)	9 (49)	6 (43)	4 (40)	8 (47)
Average precipitation mm (inches)	88 (3.5)	60 (2.4)	51 (2.0)	58 (2.3)	56 (2.2)	50 (2.0)	54 (2.1)	62 (2.4)	67 (2.6)	105 (4.1)	103 (4.1)	97 (3.8)	851 (33.5)
Source: Met Office

Average sea temperature
Jan	Feb	Mar	Apr	May	Jun	Jul	Aug	Sep	Oct	Nov	Dec	Year
9.2 °C (48.6 °F)	8.7 °C (47.7 °F)	8.2 °C (46.8 °F)	9.6 °C (49.3 °F)	11.4 °C (52.5 °F)	13.6 °C (56.5 °F)	15.4 °C (59.7 °F)	16.9 °C (62.4 °F)	17.3 °C (63.1 °F)	16.3 °C (61.3 °F)	14.7 °C (58.5 °F)	12.0 °C (53.6 °F)	12.8 °C (55.0 °F)

== See also ==
- List of conurbations in the United Kingdom
