= Robert Woodard (Royal Navy officer) =

Royal Navy Rear Admiral (born 1939)

Rear-Admiral Sir Robert Woodard KCVO DL
- Born: 13 January 1939 (age 87)
- Military career
- Allegiance: United Kingdom
- Branch: Royal Navy
- Rank: Rear-Admiral
- Commands: 771 Naval Air Squadron; 848 Naval Air Squadron; HMS Amazon; HMS Osprey; HMY Britannia
- Awards: Knight Commander of the Royal Victorian Order

Rear-Admiral Sir Robert Nathaniel Woodard, KCVO, DL (/ˈwʊdɑːrd/ WUUD-ard; born 13 January 1939) is a former Commander of the Royal Yacht Britannia.

== Naval career ==
Educated at Lancing College, the school founded by his great-grandfather, Rev Nathaniel Woodard, Woodard joined the Royal Navy and specialised in aviation. He commanded 771 Naval Air Squadron and 848 Naval Air Squadron and then took charge of the frigate HMS Amazon. Promoted to captain he was given command of HMS Glasgow. Appointment as Flag Captain to Flag Officer Sea Training and command of the naval air station HMS Osprey followed in 1985 and then became Commodore on the River Clyde in 1988 before being appointed Flag Officer, Royal Yachts with specific responsibility for the Royal Yacht Britannia in 1990. He retired in 1995.

He served as equerry to Queen Elizabeth II and as Deputy Lieutenant of Cornwall. The Sir Robert Woodard Academy, which has been named in his honour, was opened on the site of the previous school, Boundstone Community College, in September 2009.

== Family ==
In 1963 he married Rosamund Lucia Gibbs; they have two sons and one daughter.
