= Listed buildings in Denstone =

Denstone is a civil parish in the district of East Staffordshire, Staffordshire, England. It contains 30 buildings that are recorded in the National Heritage List for England. Of these, five are listed at Grade II*, the middle grade, and the others are at Grade II, the lowest grade. The parish contains the village of Denstone and the surrounding countryside. Most of the listed buildings are houses and associated structures, cottages, farmhouses and farm buildings. All Saints Church in the village, designed by G. E. Street, is listed together with associated structures, also designed by Street. In the parish is Denstone College, and structures associated with it are listed. The other listed buildings include a triumphal arch and two lodges at one of the former entrances to Alton Towers, a milestone and three mileposts, a bridge, a Methodist chapel, and a village cross and drinking fountain.

== Key ==
Grade	Criteria
II*	Particularly important buildings of more than special interest
II	Buildings of national importance and special interest

== Buildings ==
Name and location	Photograph	Date	Notes	Grade
Lower House; 52.97892°N 1.84891°W	—	1630	The house, built by Wylliam Orpe in the mid-1640s. was extended in the 20th century. It is in stone, with a moulded eaves cornice and a tile roof with coped verges. There are two storeys and an attic, and two bays. It has a fire window, and the other windows are mullioned, some with hood moulds. In the centre is a gabled porch with a shallow cambered arch, and a doorway with the date above. For its history during the English Civil War, see Wootton Lodge.	II
Milestone at N.G.R. SK 11054152; 52.97136°N 1.83695°W	—	17th century	The milestone is on the west side of the B5030 road. It has a triangular section and a flat top, and is inscribed "6", the rest of the inscription being illegible.	II
Manor Farm House; 52.97827°N 1.84958°W	—	1708	The farmhouse incorporates material from an earlier house, and was later extended. It is in stone and has a tile roof with coped verges on shaped kneelers. There are two storeys and an attic, a main range of three bays, a lower parallel range at the rear, a projecting 19th-century brick wing, and a further lean-to extension. In the centre is a doorway with a dated lintel, and there is a continuous hood mould over the ground floor. Some windows are mullioned, and others are casements. Inside the farmhouse are timber framed walls.	II
Stone House; 52.96376°N 1.85822°W	—	1712	The house, which was extended in the 19th century, is in stone with a band, and a tile roof with coped verges on shaped kneelers with the bases of former finials. There are two storeys and an attic, three bays, and a later rear wing, giving an L-shaped plan. Above the central doorway is a datestone, and over that is a small oval window. The other windows on the front are replacement casements, and in the east gable end is a two-light window with chamfered mullions.	II
Coach house and stables, Barrowhill; 52.96250°N 1.83787°W	—	18th century	The coach house and stables are in red brick with a moulded eaves cornice and a hipped tile roof. There are storeys and seven bays. In the centre is a segmental coach arch, over which is a lunette, a gable with a clock face, and a cupola. The windows and doorways have segmental heads, and there is a flight of external steps.	II
Former agricultural buildings near Lower House; 52.97918°N 1.84856°W	—	18th century (probable)	The buildings are in red brick with tile roofs. They have one storey and a roughly L-shaped plan, consisting of a three-bay former cowhouse, and a projecting two-bay granary extension. External steps lead up to a loft door in the granary, and the other openings include garage doors, a doorway with a segmental head, and a casement window.	II
Barrowhill; 52.96223°N 1.83729°W	—	Late 18th century	The house is in painted pebbledash. The main range has two storeys and seven bays and a central semi-octagonal projection, and there are two-bay single-storey wings to the left and right, the latter with a semi-octagonal end. The main range has a parapet and urn finials. The windows are a mix of sashes and casements, and in the centre is a semicircular Doric porch and a doorway with a rectangular fanlight.	II
Farm buildings, Barrowhill; 52.96278°N 1.83795°W	—	Late 18th to early 19th century	The farm buildings consist of a barn, stables and cowhouses. They are in red brick with tile roofs, and form two ranges on the north and east sides of a farmyard. The buildings have one storey, and the openings include doorways, casement windows, air vents, and a cartshed entrance.	II
Hay barn, Barrowhill; 52.96305°N 1.83812°W	—	Late 18th to early 19th century	The hay barn is in red brick with a tile roof. There is one storey and four open fronted bays. The barn contains patterned air vents and a pitching hatch.	II
Ice house, Barrowhill; 52.96296°N 1.84014°W	—	Early 19th century (probable)	The ice house is in the grounds of the farm. It is in brick and has a conical plan with an entrance to the north.	II
North Lodge, Quixhill; 52.96898°N 1.85154°W	—	Early 19th century	The lodge is in stone, it has a square plan, and is in Neoclassical style. There is one storey, and one bay. The lodge has a Tuscan portico with a triangular pediment and a plain parapet.	II*
South Lodge, Quixhill; 52.96869°N 1.85174°W	—	Early 19th century	The lodge is in stone, it has a square plan, and is in Neoclassical style. There is one storey, and one bay. The lodge has a Tuscan portico with a triangular pediment and a plain parapet.	II*
Triumphal arch, gates and railings, Quixhill; 52.96885°N 1.85173°W		Early 19th century	The arch is at one of the former entrances to Alton Towers. It is in stone, and in Neoclassical style. There is a central round-headed moulded arch with a raised keystone and Tuscan pilasters. This is flanked by flat-headed arches on Tuscan columns, all arches having full entablatures. The main arch contains wrought iron gates, and outside the outer arches are wrought iron railings with fleur-de-lys crested standards linking with the lodges.	II*
Quixhill Bridge; 52.96804°N 1.85142°W		Early 19th century	The bridge carries the B5032 road over the River Churnet. It is in stone and consists of three semicircular arches, the middle arch the largest. The bridge has chamfered voussoirs, a plain parapet with a plain band, and drum piers at the ends.	II
Stubwood Methodist Chapel, walls, railings and gate 52.95756°N 1.85724°W		1841	The chapel is in stone with a shaped eaves course and a hipped slate roof. In the centre is a projecting stuccoed porch with Tuscan pilasters and a cambered lintel, above which is an inscribed panel. Flanking the porch are chamfered mullioned windows with rebated surrounds, hood moulds, and latticed lights. There is a lean-to extension to the left with a corrugated iron roof. The forecourt is enclosed by walls, square gate piers, cast iron railings, and a gate.	II
Milepost opposite Stone Bank; 52.96636°N 1.85752°W		Mid 19th century	The milepost is on the north side of the B5032 road. It is in cast iron and has a triangular plan and a chamfered top, On the top is inscribed "DENSTONE PARISH" and on the sides are the distances to Denstone, Ellastone, Ashbourne, Alton, and Cheadle.	II
All Saints Church Hall; 52.96441°N 1.85161°W	—	c. 1860	The church hall was designed by G. E. Street in Gothic style, and is in red brick with stone dressings and a parapet, and has a tile roof with coped verges. There is one storey and four bays, the left bay projecting. The building contains buttresses, windows, and a segmental-headed doorway.	II
Coach house, stable and wall, All Saints Vicarage; 52.96590°N 1.85277°W	—	c. 1860	The coach house and stable were designed by G. E. Street. They are in stone with quoins and a tile roof, and they form an L-shaped plan. The coach house on the left has a segmental coach arch, and the projecting gabled sable is to the right. This contains a casement window and segmental-headed doors, and in the right gable end is a three-light mullioned window. To the left, a wall with stone coping, about 8 feet (2.4 m) high, connects the building to the vicarage.	II
All Saints Church; 52.96541°N 1.85206°W		1860–62	The church was designed by G. E. Street and is in stone with pink bands and tile roofs. It consists of a nave, a south porch, a chancel with a rounded apse and a north vestry, and a north tower. The tower is cylindrical with a conical roof, and has paired lancet bell openings. At the west end is a rose window, and in the church most of the windows are lancets.	II*
All Saints School; 52.96463°N 1.85168°W	—	1860–62	The school was designed by G. E. Street in Gothic style. It is in stone with a tile roof, and has a T-shaped plan consisting of a main range with one storey, and a projecting wing on the left with two storeys and a hipped roof. On the front is a porch with a segmental arched doorway, and three-light windows with trefoil heads, between which are buttresses. In the wing is a three-light window with chamfered mullions in the ground floor, a three-light trefoil window on the upper floor, and a cross window in the mezzanine.	II
All Saints Vicarage; 52.96586°N 1.85261°W	—	1860–62	The vicarage was designed by G. E. Street and is in stone with quoins and a half-hipped tile roof. There are two storeys, two parallel ranges, and a wing to the south. The doorway has a pointed head, and the windows are sashes, many with mullions.	II*
Cross, All Saints Church; 52.96521°N 1.85203°W	—	1862	The cross is in the churchyard and was designed by G. E. Street. It is in stone, and has two circular steps and a circular moulded base. On this is a shaft with four vertical lines of dog-tooth ornament, and a grooved cross head linked by a circle with fleur-de-lys. On the second step is an inscription.	II
Lychgate, All Saints Church; 52.96529°N 1.85159°W	—	1862	The lychgate at the entrance to the churchyard was designed by G. E. Street. It is in stone with a timber superstructure and a blue tile roof, and contains low wooden gates.	II
Milepost at N.G.R. SK 10994123; 52.96846°N 1.83789°W		Mid to late 19th century	The milepost is on the west side of the B5030 road. It is in cast iron and has a triangular plan and a chamfered top. On the top is inscribed "QUIXHILL" and on the sides are the distances to Ellastone, and Rocester.	II
Milepost near Prestwood Lane; 52.97266°N 1.84108°W		Mid to late 19th century	The milepost is on the north side of the B5032 road. It is in cast iron and has a triangular plan and a chamfered top, On the top is inscribed "QUIXHILL PARISH" and on the sides are the distances to Ellastone, Ashbourne, Alton, and Cheadle.	II
Denstone College; 52.96018°N 1.86814°W		1868–73	The college was designed by William Slater and Richard Carpenter in Gothic style. It is in stone with quoins, and has a tile roof with coped verges on kneelers and crested ridge tiles. The school has an H-shaped plan, with a central range of two storeys, lower flanking wings with two storeys and attics, and a front of eleven bays. On the corners of the southwest front are four-stage square towers with pyramidal roofs. In the centre of the entrance front is a gabled porch and a doorway with a pointed head, over which is a statuette of the founder.	II
Denstone College Chapel; 52.95972°N 1.86721°W	—	1879–87	The chapel was designed by Richard Carpenter and Benjamin Ingelow in Gothic style, it is in stone and has a tile roof with crested ridge tiles. The chapel consists of a nave with a polygonal apse, and has flanking towers with lancet windows.	II
Denstone College Hall; 52.96037°N 1.86818°W	—	1888–91	The school hall forms the north wing of the college. It is in stone with moulded string courses, and has a tile roof with coped verges and crested ridge tiles, and is in Gothic style. There are two storeys and five bays with buttresses. Most of the windows are lancets, and the doorway has a segmental head and a hood mould ending in a wreath. In the northeast gable end is an inscribed panel.	II
Village cross and drinking fountain 52.96325°N 1.85240°W	—	1900	The village cross and drinking fountain are in stone. They are on two steps, and have an octagonal pedestal with an inscription, containing a spring in a recess with a shaped head and a semicircular projecting trough. On the pedestal is an octagonal base carrying an octagonal shaft and a foliated cross.	II
War memorial, Denstone College; 52.95935°N 1.86854°W	—	1919	The war memorial is in stone, and consists of a hero in armour with a sword and a shield.	II
