= All Saints' Church, Denstone =

All Saints’ Church, Denstone
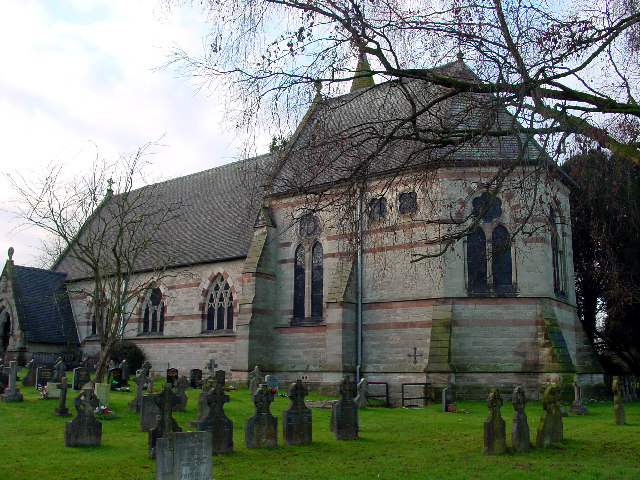
- All Saints’ Church, Denstone
- All Saints’ Church, Denstone
- 52°57′55.01″N 1°51′7.08″W
- OS grid reference: SK 10037 40901
- Location: Denstone, Staffordshire
- Country: England
- Denomination: Church of England

History
- Dedication: All Saints

Architecture
- Heritage designation: Grade II* listed
- Architect: George Edmund Street
- Style: Middle Pointed Gothic
- Groundbreaking: 1860
- Completed: 1862

Administration
- Diocese: Diocese of Lichfield
- Archdeaconry: Stoke-on-Trent
- Deanery: Uttoxeter
- Parish: Denstone

All Saints' Church, Denstone is a Grade II* listed parish church in the Church of England in Denstone.

== History ==
The church was built between 1860 and 1862 to designs of the architect George Edmund Street, funded by Sir Thomas Percival Heywood, 2nd Baronet. At the same time, Street also designed the lychgate, churchyard cross, vicarage and village school.

== Fittings ==
The font on four marble columns is by Street, with carvings of four angels on each corner holding reversed jars to symbolise the four Rivers of Paradise by Thomas Earp.

The pulpit, chandeliers and wrought-iron screen are also by Street. There is stained glass by Clayton and Bell.

== Organ ==
The church has an organ which originally was built by Nicholson & Son in 1868 with the organ case by G. E. Street. A specification of the organ can be found on the National Pipe Organ Register.

== Churchyard ==
The churchyard contains the war grave of a Colonel Bertram of the Manchester Regiment of World War I.

== See also ==
- Grade II* listed buildings in East Staffordshire
- Listed buildings in Denstone
