= Lancing, West Sussex =

Village and parish in West Sussex, England

Coordinates: 50.832°N 0.319°W

Lancing
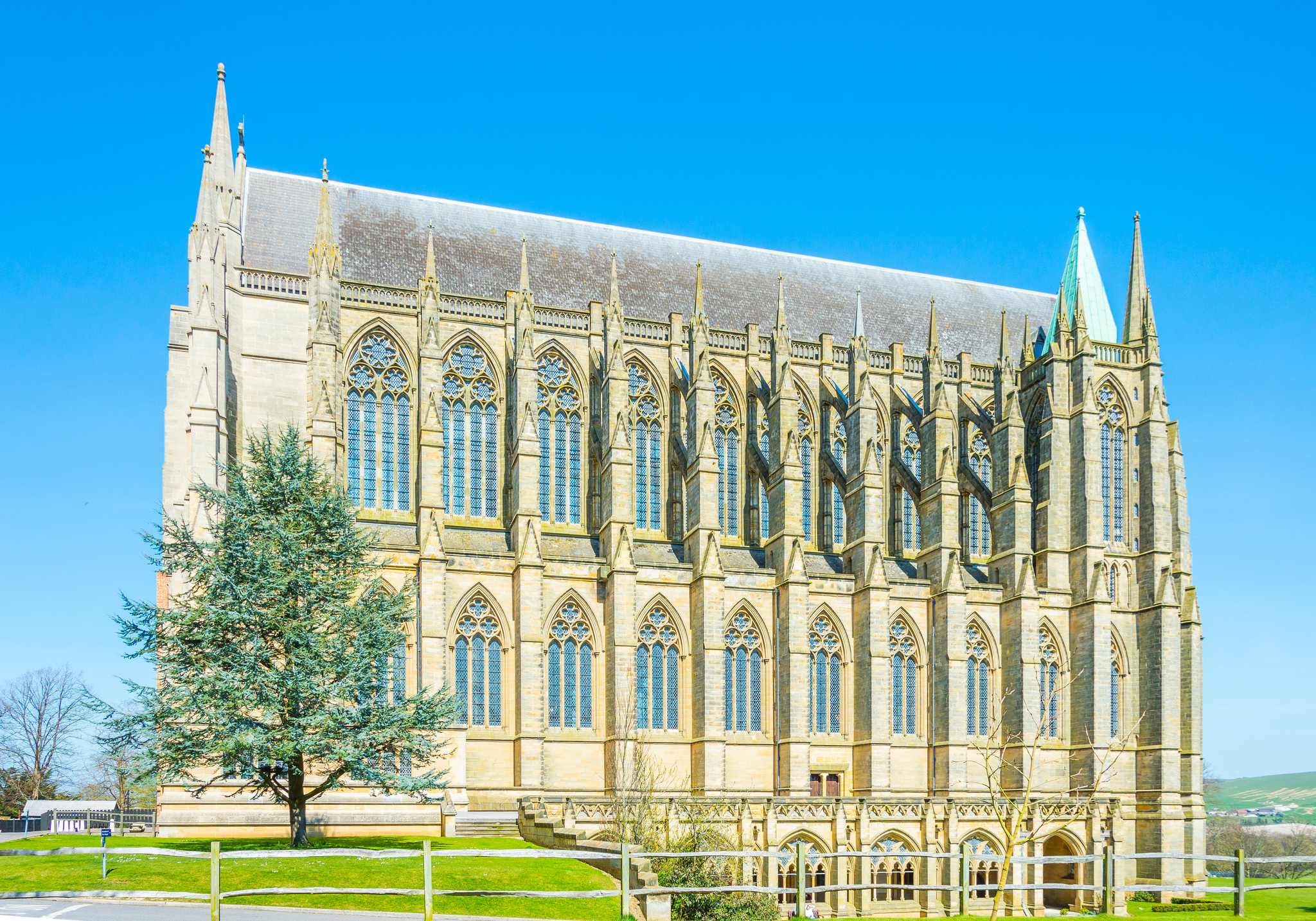
- Lancing College Chapel

- Location within West Sussex
- Area: 14.14 km^{2} (5.46 sq mi)
- Population: 18,810 (Civil Parish 2011)
  - Density: 1,330/km^{2} (3,400/sq mi)
- OS grid reference: TQ184049
  - London: 47 miles (76 km) N
- District: Adur
- Shire county: West Sussex
- Region: South East
- Country: England
- Sovereign state: United Kingdom
- Post town: LANCING
- Postcode district: BN15
- Dialling code: 01903
- Police: Sussex
- Fire: West Sussex
- Ambulance: South East Coast
- UK Parliament: East Worthing and Shoreham
- Website: Parish Council

Lancing is a large coastal village and civil parish in the Adur district of West Sussex, England, on the western edge of the Adur Valley. It occupies part of the narrow central section of the Sussex coastal plain between smaller Sompting to the west, larger Shoreham-by-Sea to the east, and the parish of Coombes to the north. Excluding definitive suburbs it may have the largest undivided village cluster in Britain. However, its economy is commonly analysed as integral to the Brighton/Worthing/Littlehampton conurbation. Its settled area beneath the South Downs National Park covers 3.65 square miles (9.5 square kilometres; 2,340 acres), the majority of its land.

The Lancing area is characterised by mid-rise coastal urban homes, farmland, and wildlife reserves of the northern chalk downs and River Adur estuary. There are non-religious structures that date back to the early 16th century. The population in 2002 was approximately 19,000. In the 2011 census the population for Lancing and Coombes was recorded as 18,810.

The village was a popular seaside resort in the mid-19th century. Summer tourist hallmarks are the traditional guesthouses on the A259 coast road (Brighton Road), as well as a caravan/campsite in Old Salts Farm Road, and beach chair hire and ice cream businesses.

== Location ==
There is a shingle beach with good stretches of clean sand at low water. Part of the coast road does not directly adjoin the sea but instead the long and narrow Widewater, a rare brackish lagoon, and the only known location of the probably extinct Ivell's sea anemone. Immediately north of the developed area is Lancing Ring, a Nature Reserve in the South Downs National Park. To the north of that is farmed agricultural downland connected to Lancing College Farm. On its eastern side is Shoreham Airport, the world's oldest continually operated airport, which was an RAF base in World War II.

The village's boundary with Sompting to the west has historically been along Boundstone Lane, named after the boundstone or boundary stone that marked the boundary. The stone is now kept at Boundstone Nursery School, Upper Boundstone Lane, having previously been kept at Boundstone Community College, which has now been closed and transformed into The Sir Robert Woodard Academy. Much of Lancing's northern boundary with the village of Coombes runs along the Ladywell Stream, a tributary of the River Adur which runs from the South Downs near to Lancing College. The source of the Ladywell Stream, the Ladywell Spring, is believed to be an ancient holy well or sacred stream with pre-Christian significance.

== History ==
In 1828, remains of what may be an Iron Age shrine and to its west a later Romano-British temple were found just west of Lancing Ring. The Romano-British temple was located within an oval temenos and seems to have been built in the 1st century AD. A track has existed since Celtic British times which ran from Chanctonbury Ring via Cissbury Ring to Lancing Ring and from then on to a probable ford across the River Adur by the modern Sussex Pad, close to the Old Tollbridge at Old Shoreham. Among this lowest lying farmland to the east of the village proper are remains of medieval salt workings. The Roman road, Stane (Stone) Street, from Noviomagus Reginorum (Chichester) to Novus Portus (probably Portslade near Brighton) also ran through modern North Lancing (along the Street) down to the ford.

=== 1800–1945 ===
Much of the land which is residential was formerly taken up by family-run market gardening businesses growing fruit or flowers for the Brighton Market or Covent Garden in London. The largest businesses were Sparks who grew fruit such as tomatoes and Young's which produced carnations. Chrysanthemums were grown by Frank Lisher on land south of The Finches, in a house that he had built. Nash's fruit growers produced grapes under huge glass cloches that could be rolled into place on a rail track.

Lancing railway station opened with what is now known as the West Coastway Line in 1849. Between 1908 and 1912 the London, Brighton and South Coast Railway developed its railway wagon and carriage works in the area that is now the Lancing Business Park, closed in 1965 as part of British Rail's Beeching Plan of 1963. The land on which the works were sited was predominantly turned over to this park, which is also known as the Churchill Industrial Estate.

Few buildings pre-dating 1820 are here, however one example is a central former farmhouse, which is now a home named Monks Farm Presbytery on North Road.

=== Since 1945 ===
Following World War II market gardening gave way to housing as diets became more exotic and more difficult to ripen fruits such as grapes began to be imported in greater numbers; this growth was most rapid between 1945 and 1970, with more muted housing growth following on in most years. The village has a large business park, and many smaller local business establishments. In economics and transport, the suburb forms part of the linear and diverse Brighton/Worthing/Littlehampton conurbation.

== Etymology ==
Lancing probably means the people of Wlanc or people of Hlanc. Like many places throughout this part of Sussex, Lancing has an -ing ending, meaning people of. Wlanc seems to mean proud or imperious, while Hlanc seems to mean lank or lean. The suggestion that Lancing takes its name from the Wlencing or Wlenca, the son of the South Saxon king Ælle, has been discounted.

== Landmarks ==
Shoreham Tollbridge is a Grade II* listed building which was the last toll bridge in use in Sussex. The bridge was in use for motorised traffic until the opening of the A27 flyover over the Adur in 1970. The bridge is in the east of the parish, crossing the Adur into Shoreham.

Shoreham Airport, the oldest licensed airfield in the UK, opened in 1911, is in the parish.

Lancing College, see below, has a predominantly 19th Century chapel that is the largest school chapel in the world with the largest stained-glass rose window in England (completed in 1977).

== Education ==
The local senior school, The Sir Robert Woodard Academy, is located just inside the contiguous village of Sompting. It is a mixed comprehensive of around 1,400 students from ages 11–18. The site was formerly occupied by Boundstone Community College.

In the north-east of the parish on the Downs lies Lancing College, an independent school and major landmark.

There are also three primary schools. Seaside Primary (formerly Freshbrook First School and Thornberry Middle School) is on Freshbrook Road and The Globe Primary (formerly The Willows First School and Oakfield Middle School) is on Irene Avenue. These two schools were formed in 2008-9 when each of the previous middle schools joined with the nearest of the first schools in Lancing. North Lancing Primary School has always been a first and middle school.

== Literary connections ==
Lancing was visited by Oscar Wilde in the 1890s when he stayed at nearby Worthing. The working title for his masterpiece The Importance of Being Earnest was Lady Lancing. Wilde's friend and lover, the poet Lord Alfred Douglas lived in nearby Brighton and died while staying at Monk's Farmhouse mentioned above. Lancing was also visited by another poet, Algernon Charles Swinburne, who stayed at The Terrace in the 1880s.

== Sport ==
=== Football ===
Premier League club Brighton & Hove Albion have their training facilities at Mash Barn Lane, Lancing. Some of Albion's fixtures in the Premier League Under 21 competition are played here. Nearby are situated semi-professional Worthing who play in the National League South.

Teams in the village cover all ages of adult and junior games:

Lancing F.C. is based at the Culver Road 3G Ground, owned by Sussex County FA, and also Monks Recreation Ground. Lancing F.C. is the village's main club, formed in 1941, and is currently playing in the Isthmian League South East Division.

Lancing United FC are the second largest adult male football club in the local area and they play their matches at Croshaw Recreation Ground, Boundstone Lane.

Lancing F.C., Lancing United Colts F.C. and Lancing Rangers F.C. are the three local youth football clubs supporting football for all male and females aged from U6 - 18, playing their matches at a number of different football pitches found within Lancing and Sompting.

The Sussex County Football Association is based at Culver Road in the village and they share ownership of the newly built 3G pitch at Culver Road with Lancing F.C.

=== Cricket ===
Two clubs play, Lancing Lads Official and Lancing Manor Cricket Club who play at the ground near the junction of the A27 and Manor Road.

== People ==
The writer Ted Walker was born in Lancing in 1934 and grew up at 186, Brighton Road, by the Widewater. His autobiographical work, The High Path takes its name from the footpath that ran between Brighton road and the Widewater, and which was formerly a public right of way.

As a child, heavyweight boxer Sir Henry Cooper was evacuated from London to Lancing, along with identical twin brother George.

Many well-known figures attended Lancing College, including novelists Tom Sharpe, Evelyn Waugh, lyricist Tim Rice, and singer Peter Pears.

Hertha Ayrton (1854–1923), electrical engineer, mathematician, physicist, inventor and suffragette, died at New Cottage, North Lancing on 26 August 1923.

== Twin towns ==
Lancing, (along with the other urban districts of Adur) is twinned with:

- Żywiec, Poland
- Riom, France
