= The Littlehampton Academy =

Location
- Fitzalan Road; Littlehampton, West Sussex, BN17 6FE; England; 50°48′58″N 0°32′02″W

Information
- Other name: TLA
- Former name: Littlehampton Community School
- Type: Academy
- Motto: Inspire growth; reap success
- Religious affiliation: Christian
- Established: 1972
- Local authority: West Sussex County Council
- Trust: Woodard Academies Trust
- Specialists: Business & Enterprise; Humanities (English)
- Department for Education URN: 135745 Tables
- Ofsted: Reports
- Principal: Sarah Pringle
- Gender: Mixed
- Age range: 11–18
- Enrolment: 1,398 (2018)
- Capacity: 1,900
- Houses: Mandela; Roddick; Shakespeare; Teresa; (Note: Referred to as Chapters)
- Colours: Light blue and purple
- Website: www.tla.woodard.co.uk

The Littlehampton Academy (TLA, formerly Littlehampton Community School) is an 11–18 mixed, Christian, secondary school and sixth form with academy status in Littlehampton, West Sussex, England. It was formerly a community school that was established in 1972, and adopted its present name after becoming an academy in 2009. It is part of the Woodard Academies Trust.

== History ==
=== Littlehampton Community School – 1972 to 2009 ===
Logo of Littlehampton Community School.

Littlehampton Community School (LCS) was a community school that opened as Littlehampton Comprehensive School in 1972, following a merger between Andrew Cairns Secondary School for Boys and Maud Allen Secondary Modern School for Girls. This was a part of the phasing out of the secondary modern school in the late 1960s after the distribution of Circular 10/65.

LCS was located on a split campus site, named 'Hill Road' and 'Elm Grove' respectively due to their proximity to neighbouring roads. The main 'Hill Road' campus consisted of the English, Science, Humanities, Languages, Core Curriculum, Learning Support, Performance and Physical Education departments, whilst 'Elm Grove' campus was home to the Design Technology department and a disused Maths block. The two campuses were linked by a pathway.

In its final years, largely due to the ageing nature of the school, many new buildings were built, including a separate sixth form college, a specialist business and enterprise centre, and a 'Maths Village'. The Maths Village, which opened in December 2007, underwent rushed construction following the discovery of asbestos in the original maths block, which was first built more than seventy years earlier as a military hospital in World War II. The new Maths Village building was then, just days after its opening, raided by thieves who stole a multimedia projector leading the new Maths Village to be the subject of widespread ridicule within the school. The library and science block meanwhile were also relatively modern in comparison to the rest of the school, being rebuilt in 1991 following an arson attack on the school.

LCS left its historical house system in favour of a year-based system. The house system involved students being sorted into one of five houses which were all named after hills located in West Sussex; Amberley, Bignor, Chantry, Highdown and Rackham. In contrast to this, a reorganisation in 2004 saw students being sorted into one of three 'learning teams' which were all named after species of trees; Larch (Red), Chestnut (Yellow) and Sycamore (Blue) – the initials subsequently spelling the acronym of the school, 'LCS'. The main difference in the latter system was the establishment of five 'Head of Year' posts.

==== Specialist status ====
In 2003, the school successfully applied to become a Business and Enterprise specialist school. Much of the money that was required was donated by Anita Roddick, the then owner of The Body Shop. As a result of this donation, a new building that was built with this money was named 'The Roddick Enterprise Centre' (normally abbreviated to 'REC').

The successful implementation of Business and Enterprise specialism meant the school often entered teams into national competitions. The most successful of these was the school's entry into the 2005 Yell Challenge, which they won and, as a result, set up a new school radio station called "Revamp Radio". It launched on Tuesday 18 September 2006, with help from Arun District Council Chairman Stephen Haymes and kids TV presenter Dave Benson Phillips.

The school successfully reapplied for, and was subsequently re-designated a Business and Enterprise specialist school in November 2007, following the completion of the schools original four-year plan.

==== Specialist services ====
The school provided many specialist services that were targeted to assist the most needy within the school, these included the 'Learn2Learn Centre' and 'Bully Busters'. The Learn2Learn Centre was formally known as 'The Bridge' and was a building based in the oldest part of the school. It was set up in the early 2000s to help students with behavioural problems in the classroom. When a student was placed into the centre, they were set tasks in order to help control anger issues and behaviour. Students that complete tasks successfully were rewarded with activity days.

The school's pupils worked with Sussex Police in a bid to stamp out cyber-bullying among teenagers. The school produced a "Bully Buster" advice website which was featured on BBC South Today after it received recognition from both the police and its feeder schools.

==== Littlehampton College ====
Logo of Littlehampton College.

The school had a separate sixth form college building which was located within the school grounds, to the west of the main buildings. It was a semi-autonomous community college in which the school maintained control. The college offered a range of qualifications, including AS and A2 A-Levels, GCSEs and BTEC awards. It maintained strong links with the school through various methods, such as college students became involved in several lower-school events, particularly creative ones and other drama department productions.

It provided a range of events and programmes, both educational and social that students could participate in. For example, it had a college committee which was responsible for making student's feelings heard, improving the general college environment and organising the various social events. A volunteering organisation known as 'OUTSET', which was part of 'V'; the government run scheme where students could offer their time to local projects and organisations in order to work towards nationally recognised certificates.

As the college was maintained by the school, its Business and Enterprise specialist status was incorporated into the college. It ran three Roddick Conferences throughout the year in order to mark their specialist status. These conferences ranged from a day in business events entitled 'Suited & Booted', a day of volunteering in the local community called 'Day of Action', a global and environmental awareness day entitled 'One World', and a film festival and showcase – 'Room 5 Film Festival'. It was named after Anita Roddick, a supporter of the school.

==== Proposed academy ====
The main Hill Road buildings.

The proposal of an academy in Littlehampton was first made in 2007, shortly after the school lost out to Bognor Regis Community College in the bidding for a full rebuild under the Building Schools for the Future programme. Shortly afterwards, the school, West Sussex County Council and Woodard Schools signed an agreement to turn the school into an academy, alongside two other establishments in West Sussex. The DCSF quickly accepted the submitted 'expressions of interest', and asked LCS to develop a feasibility study, moving the development of an academy much closer.

An early suggestion proposed during the feasibility study was to name the new institution after Dame Anita Roddick, a long-time supporter of the school, who had recently died. This suggestion was never taken up by Woodard Schools, who opted for the name 'The Littlehampton Academy'.

The feasibility study saw much opposition to the academy proposals becoming evident, with the National Union of Teachers (NUT) openly opposing the plans, stating that they were "not impressed" by Woodard's lack of detailed discussions on the proposals, and the number of issues which they claim the school's senior management team refuses to address.

The main consultation event was held on 13 March 2008, and was open to parents, staff, students and wider members of the community, who could put questions to a panel that included the headteacher, chairman of the school governors, a West Sussex County Council representative, head of the consultation process and representatives from the Woodard Trust. One of the main concerns raised at the event was the possibility of the Academy becoming a faith-designated establishment, a suggestion widely denied by Woodard. The results of this consultation were largely negative, a reaction that 'surprised' the school. Feedback from the evening showed that seven staff were in favour of academy plans with fifty against, whilst 36 parents said they supported the move, compared to 141 who opposed it.

Despite opposition to the proposal, the Department for Children, Schools and Families approved the plans for an academy in September 2008, with West Sussex County Council saying they were "confident the academies will enhance educational opportunities". Parents' fears of major changes intensified shortly afterwards when the headteacher, Jayne Wilson, announced she would be leaving the school when LCS closed, with Woodard Schools subsequently announcing that Steve Jewell would become the Academy's principal. The appointment of Jewell led to renewed speculation that the Academy would be a faith designated school, something that Woodard had constantly denied. However, the publication of the academy's prospectus confirmed that the new establishment would indeed be a "Christian designated academy". The prospectus also confirmed the school would continue in its specialism of Business and Enterprise, whilst also becoming a specialist school in English.

The approval meant the school would closed at the end of the 2008/09 academic year, ceasing to exist fully on 31 August 2009.

=== Academy – September 2009 to present ===
The Littlehampton Academy opened on the same site, using the same buildings, on 1 September 2009.

==== New build ====
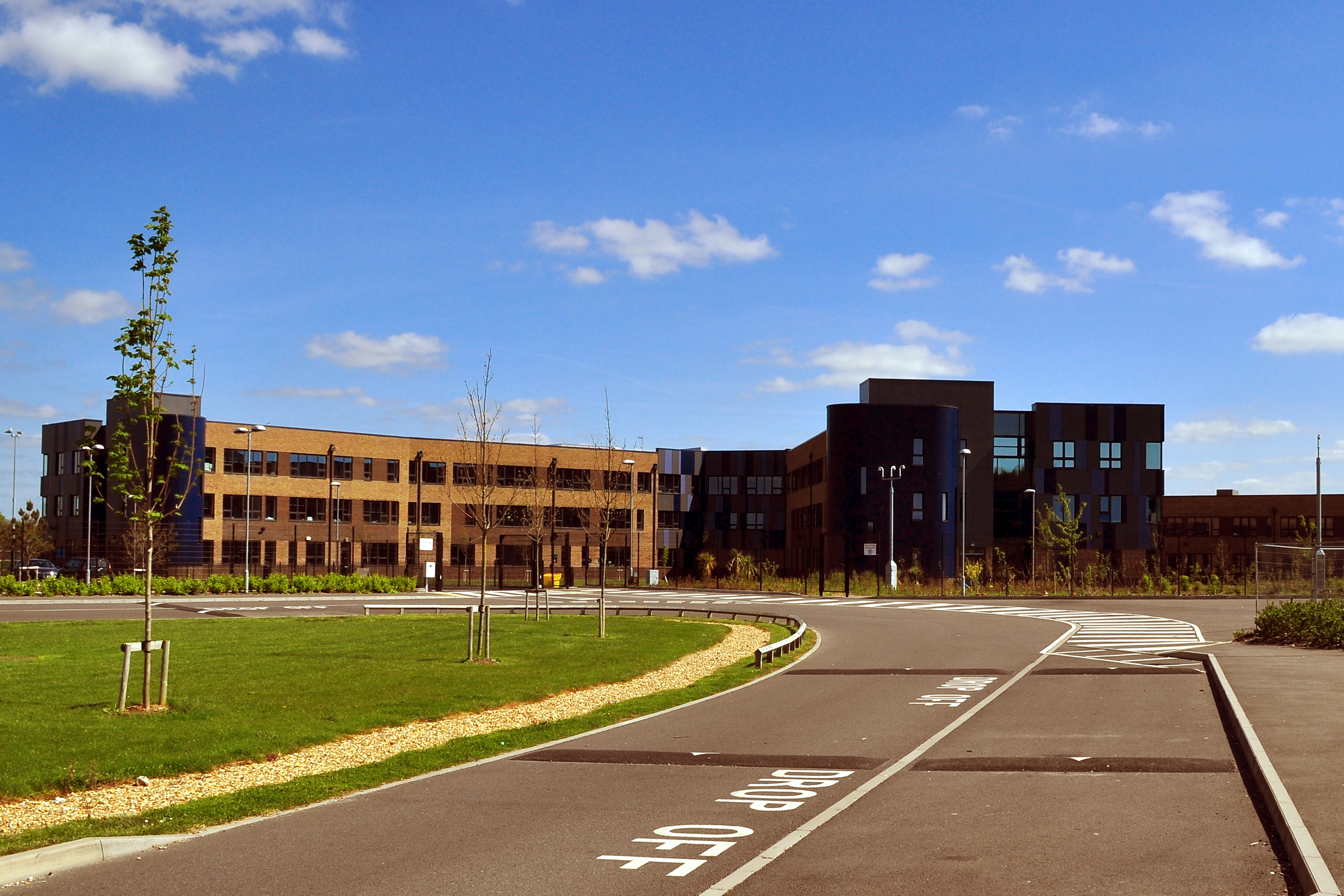
Academy from Fitzalan Road.

Plans were submitted to West Sussex County Council in August 2010 for the demolition of most of the existing buildings, to be replaced with an academy building with a capacity of 1,900 students. The application received planning permission from the council on 2 November 2010.

Construction of the new buildings commenced in December 2010, and lasted for 18 months. Construction of the new building took place on what had been school fields. The new building was completed on time in June 2012, with students moving in at the start of the 2012/13 academic year in September 2012. This move was followed by the demolition of the now derelict buildings that had been vacated, followed by landscaping.

On 7 June 2013 the new buildings were "officially" opened by comedian Hugh Dennis in a ceremony attended by senior bishops and the mayor of Littlehampton.

==== Recent developments ====
In 2011, Ofsted rated the school as "Satisfactory". But since 2012, pupils have achieved results significantly below the national and county average when it comes to GCSEs. In 2012, only 51 per cent earned five A*-C grades, including English and maths. In December 2013, it was placed in to special measures and on 31 December 2013, Steve Jewell resigned from his role as principal after more than four years in the post before the report was published. Marianne Gentilli was instated as acting principal. Her position was made permanent in May 2014.

In December 2015, the Department for Education issued a warning notice from regional schools commissioner, Dominic Herrington over "unacceptably low" performance and gave the Woodard Academies Trust until 1 February 2016 to ensure the quality of teaching improved "significantly and rapidly". This follows a pre-warning notice that was issued in October 2014. At the beginning of 2016, Marianne Gentilli stepped down from her post, days after the Trust pledged “rapid and effective improvement” at the academy. Vice principal, Morgan Thomas, was appointed acting principal, while Paul Kennedy (chief education officer of Woodard Academies Trust) was appointed as executive principal.

In March 2016, the academy was finally taken out of special measures, but was rated as "Requires Improvement". In 2017, it was listed as one of 365 schools that failed to meet the Government’s minimum standards. In April 2018, the school was still rated as "Requires Improvement" citing "Governors and the trust have not been sufficiently swift or effective in challenging leaders to improve the school quickly. They recognise that the pace of improvement since the last inspection has been too slow." and "Leaders’ actions over time have not led to sufficient improvement. Although standards are beginning to rise, pupils do not achieve as well as they should by the end of Year 11."

In August 2021 the school decided to shoot a fox and her three cubs dead who lived near the field. This caused outrage with many asking why they didn't pay to rehome them.

== Extracurricular activities ==
Every summer students are encouraged to give up their time to help out at various groups and activities serving the community. Summer Camps, Play schemes and activity weeks across the south see students from the academy volunteer and bring their skills and abilities to help other children have a great summer.

The academy also runs activity weeks abroad working alongside local charities in countries such as, Thailand, Rwanda, Uganda, Ethiopia, India, Kenya, Romania and Sri Lanka.

The academy also works closely with a Bible School in Denmark taking students from the academy.

== Awards and achievements ==
In 2015, pupils won a competition to design a new social media app or website for teenagers and presented their creations to a panel of judges in a competition organised by the Clear Computing company. This was the second year in a row that teams from the academy had reached the final three.

In 2016 the head girl won the Diana Memorial Award for her volunteering work.

In July 2018, a team from the school won the national final of a rocket car competition. The year-seven trio designed and built a miniature rocket car that reached 66.1 mph in less than one second in the final.

== Headteachers ==
The Littlehampton Academy

- 2009–2013: Steve Jewell
- 2014–2016: Marianne Gentilli
- 2016–2022: Morgan Thomas
- 2022–present: Sarah Pringle
