= Sir Robert Woodard Academy =

Location
- Upper Boundstone Lane; Sompting, West Sussex, BN15 9QZ; England
- Coordinates: 50°50′09″N 0°19′49″W

Information
- Type: Academy
- Motto: Aspire to Achieve
- Religious affiliation: Christian
- Established: 2009
- Local authority: West Sussex
- Specialists: Performing Arts Mathematics
- Department for Education URN: 135744 Tables
- Ofsted: Reports
- Chair of Governors: David Simmons
- Principal: Kieran Scanlon
- Gender: Coeducational
- Age: 11 to 18
- Enrolment: 1412
- Houses: Nightingale, Brunel, Mandela, Dickens, Lapper and Curie.
- Colours: Purple, Blue, Green, Pink, Orange and yellow.
- Sponsors: Woodard Schools; West Sussex County Council
- Website: Official website

The Sir Robert Woodard Academy (SRWA) is a mixed gender academy, sponsored by Woodard Schools and West Sussex County Council, in Lancing, West Sussex which opened in September 2009. Their motto is “Inspire to Achieve.” Children from ages 11 to 18 can be enrolled in that academy. The academy, which serves the communities of Lancing and Sompting, replaced Boundstone Community College, which closed in August 2009. The academy is named after Robert Woodard, great-grandson of Nathaniel Woodard.

== Performing Arts ==
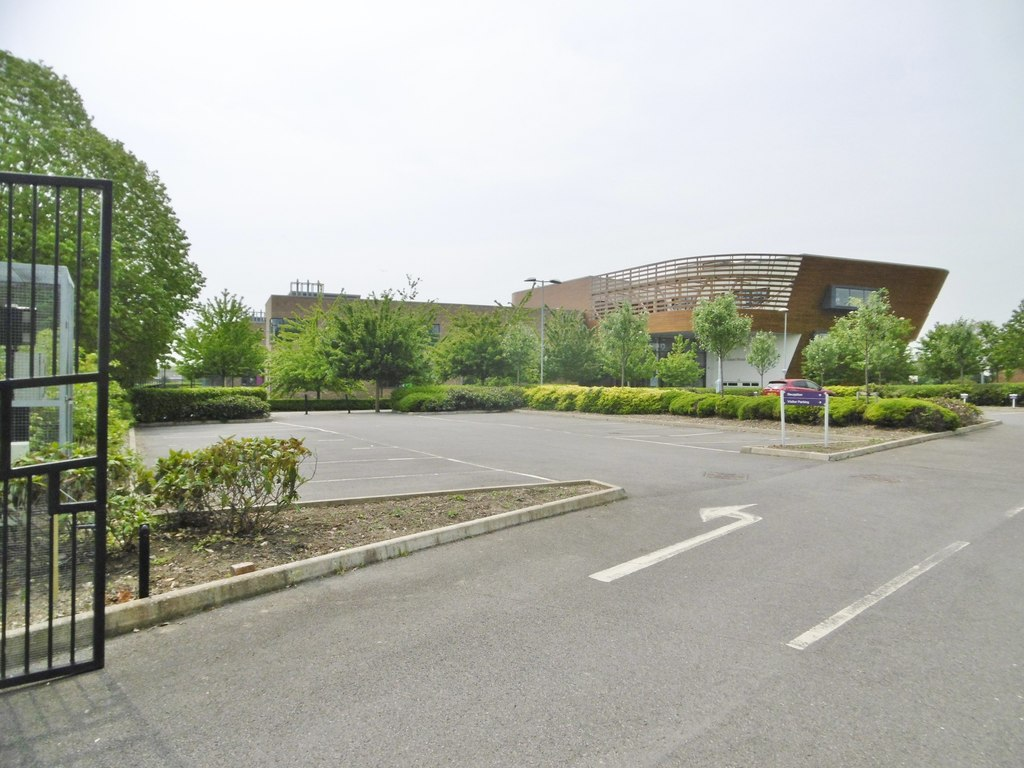
Sir Robert Woodard Academy

The Performing Arts at the Academy has long been central to the surrounding communities. There are several bands, choirs and drama and dance groups which endeavour to share a love of the arts with pupils and audiences alike, performing regularly and to a high standard. The Academy delivers a programme of dance and drama in years 7 and 8, which is then expanded in year 9-13 with Performing Arts qualifications in disciplines including set design and construction, costume, lighting, sound, make up and acting. The school's array of performing arts has a large influence in the local area, all of which can be seen during any of the numerous performances throughout the year. Concerts features every band associated with the school, from steel to orchestra, and has been a running tradition for many years.

The Academy has two academic specialisms, and Performing Arts forms one of those. The Performing Arts department produces at least three theatrical productions each year, a "Dance Extravaganza" and many shows that are part of the sixth form provision. As part of the sixth form course, students also participate in the National Theatre Connections programme which sees performers across the country produce plays by new and upcoming writers.

== STEM ==
The Academy and the Sixth form have links with engineering firm Ricardo for its STEM (Science, Technology, Engineering and Maths) programme. Students participate in the Crest Gold Award which sets students a real-world engineering challenge which they must solve with Ricardo's engineers. The Academy and Sixth Form also host an annual STEM Careers and Further Education Evening at the Ricardo's Centenary Innovation Centre in Shoreham. The Academy has also been invited to be part of a genome decoding project with the Institute for Research in Schools (IRIS) and the Wellcome Trust Genome Campus and has been designated a STEM Ambassador School by STEM Learning.

== Sixth Form ==
The Academy has a sixth form, which has been branded as W6. It offers a range of subjects with a focus on performing arts, mathematics, sciences and sports including a basketball academy. The sixth form was graded "good" in the latest Ofsted inspection, with the increasing number of students moving on to university cited as a strength.

== Sporting Facilities ==
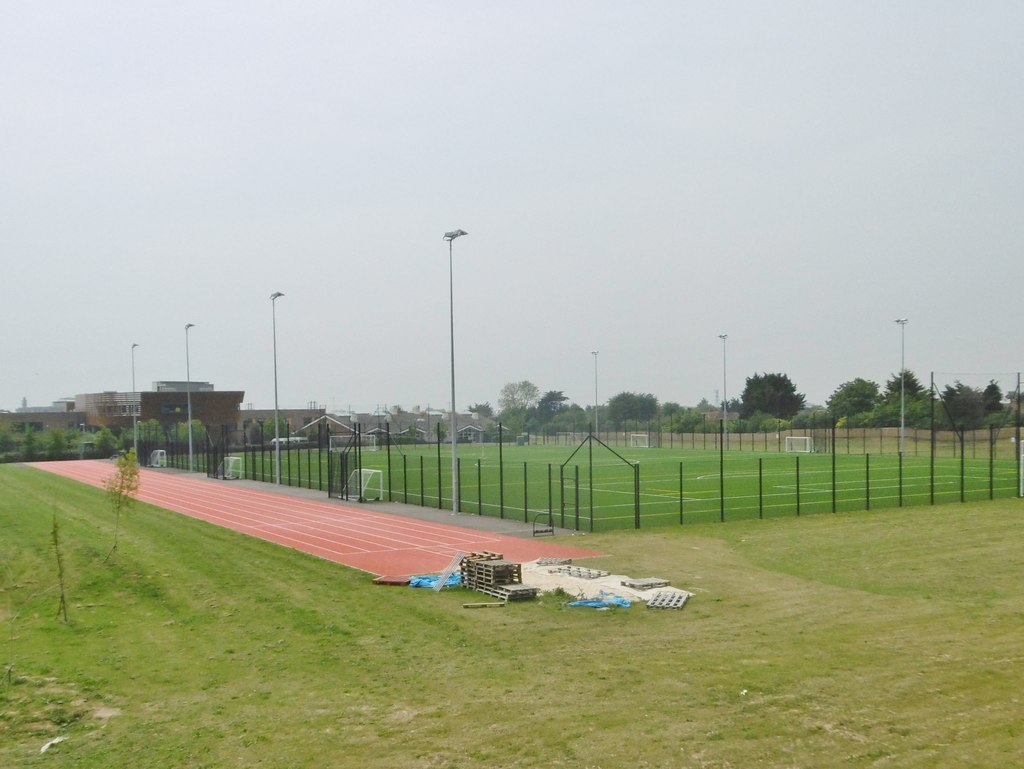
Sports ground

The Academy is home to the SRWA Sussex Bears, and a 3G football pitch is under construction. The pitch has been financed by funds from Brighton and Hove Albion in the Community to support grassroots sports and to ensure the future provision of outdoor facilities in the Adur area. The 3G pitch was agreed upon by the Adur and Worthing Council in July 2014 and works commenced in October 2017. The Academy has an education deal with Brighton and Hove Albion Football Club.

== Ofsted Inspections ==
The academy was placed in Special Measures on Friday 6 January 2012, after OFSTED deemed it was making insufficient progress in addressing bad pupil behaviour and low attainment. After intensive changes including a new headmaster, the school came out of Special Measures on 18 October 2013. Since then, the Academy has seen an improvement in student outcomes. The Ofsted report, however, identified many strengths including the careers provision, the leadership and management of the academy and the personal development, behaviour and welfare of students. It judged the Leadership and Management of the school to be good, with the Personal Development and Welfare, and 16-19 (Sixth form) provision also rated as good. The October 2021 inspection rated the Academy good in all categories.

== Community Engagement and Business Breakfast ==
The Academy hosts a termly business breakfast, which sees local businesses visit the academy. Businesses engage in presentations, business networking and the events promote links between the Academy and the local business community. The event has a range of local partners, which include local charities, Ricardo, Worthing & Adur Chamber of Commerce, Parafix, Sussex County Football Association. In the latest inspection, Ofsted described the business links and other community links as following: "the academy's work in the community is outstanding and imaginative" The Academy is a regular contributor to the Worthing Children's parade with students and the art department preparing creative works for the parade.
