= The Peterborough School =

Location
- Thorpe Road; Peterborough, Cambridgeshire, PE3 6AP; England

Information
- Former name: Westwood House School Peterborough High School
- Type: Private day school
- Motto: Unlocking every child's potential
- Religious affiliation: Church of England
- Established: 1895; 131 years ago
- Founder: May Florence Hill
- Department for Education URN: 110910 Tables
- Headmaster: Sam McCormick
- Staff: 148
- Gender: Coeducational
- Age: 4 to 18
- Enrolment: 486
- Affiliation: Woodard Corporation
- Website: www.thepeterboroughschool.co.uk

The Peterborough School, formerly Peterborough High School, is a private school located in Peterborough, England. Founded as a day school for girls, it is now a coeducational day school. The core values of the school are Family, Ambition, Character and Excellence.

== Overview ==
The Peterborough School is an independent school educating boys and girls from ages 6 weeks to 18 years. It is situated on a campus in central Peterborough. As a Woodard school, The Peterborough School is a member of the largest collection of independent Church of England schools in England and Wales.

== History ==
The school was established in 1895 as a girls' day school on Lincoln Road, Peterborough, before moving to Park Road in 1897, under the leadership of the headmistress, May Florence Hill.

Amy Mansfield became the headmistress of what was then "Peterborough High School" and on 31st August 1935, the school moved to the present ten-acre site at Westwood House, Thorpe Road. The school was originally called "Peterborough High School" and changed its name to "Westwood House School" in 1939, when Helen Belgion became headmistress. At the time, there were only seven pupils attending the school. In 1945, Helen Belgion got married at Westwood House. By 1949, 200 pupils attended Westwood House School.

In 1950, 85 Thorpe Road was purchased by the school, and subsequently became the Boarding House. Westwood House School then became an independent public school on 29th July 1950. The first major development happened to the school in 1952, with the building of the cloakroom corridor. The year after, the duck pond was built. In 1956, the School Hall and the lower floor of the West Wing were built, and in 1961, the Boarding House was sold, and the new Boarding House, known as "Belgion House", was opened.

Mrs Bowis became headmistress of the thriving school in 1961. In 1963, the first storey of the West Wing was built, and in 1965, the Arts, Science and Home Economics block was built and opened by Princess Alice. The school became a charitable trust and was incorporated into the Woodard Corporation in 1968. The Junior School located at the end of the stables was made into the school's chapel, formally known as "The Chapel of St Hugh of Lincoln", in 1971. In 1972, the duck pond was removed from the school site. An extension of the Boarding House, known as "Bowis House" was built in 1973, as well as the Science, Arts and Crafts extension being built.

In 1973, Miss Scott was appointed as headmistress. During her reign, the Sports Hall, which is now referred to as the "Old Gym", was built in 1977.

Angela Storey became headmistress of the school in 1977 and on 25th May 1984, the Arts block was built and opened by Ruth Madoc. In 1990, the Head of School's house was added to the site and in 1991, the name of the school was reverted to its original name, "Peterborough High School". In 1992, the stained glass window was installed in the school's chapel. This was acquired by supporters of the school from Little Gidding Church, which was made famous by T.S. Eliot's, a namesake of one of the school's Houses, poem "Little Gidding". The stained glass window was created by William Hopkinson in 1853. In 1994, the Sixth Form Centre, known as "The Storey Building" was built, with the Senior Library being upstairs.

Sarah Dixon became headmistress of the school in 1999, and in 2000, a new suite of ICT rooms were opened. 110 Thorpe Road was purchased and the Nursery was opened in September 2002. The Creative Arts Development from 2006 to 2008 was one of the biggest renovations the school had to date. A new Refectory Gallery was opened in 2007 by Peter Boizot, providing incredible dining facilities as well as gallery space for the school's artwork. The East Wing was also redeveloped, including a new Music Technology classroom, a backstage area, a new black-box style Drama Studio, a Sculpture Garden besides the School Hall to feature sculptures of local artists and retractable tiered seating in the School Hall. The Creative Arts Centre was opened by Charles Taylor at the gala performance of the school's musical, The Wizard of Oz in 2007.

The school's first headmaster, Adrian Meadows, was appointed in 2007. The school became coeducational in September 2010, and became Peterborough's only independent coeducational school for pupils aged 4 to 18. To reflect this change, the school's name was changed to "The Peterborough School". In 2012, the Sports Hall, also containing a modernised gym, known as "The King's Suite", was opened by Katherine Grainger on 28th September 2012. A time capsule was also buried directly outside of the Sports Hall in 2012. The school ended boarding at the end of the summer term in July 2013 and the Boarding House was redeveloped into large new classrooms. In 2014, the four science labs were upgraded and refurbished, and in 2015, the Angela Axe Garden opened, as well as a Food Technology classroom and new science lab. In 2017, the Preparatory School's playground was expanded and redeveloped and the first Head Boy was also appointed. The Storey Building was refurbished in 2018, with the top floor becoming a state-of-the-art Study Room and a new Senior Library was relocated and modernised.

The Nursery expanded, adding a new building in 2023 and a nature-themed reception classroom was installed to the Preparatory School in 2024. The Ayres Library in the Preparatory School was also built in 2025, featuring reading nooks and continuing with the nature-theme of the reception classroom, with the Year 1 and Year 2 classrooms also being completely refurbished for the new nature theme. The tennis courts, now known as "The Cooper Courts", were also completely refurbished, bringing them to a better standard and floodlights were installed. In 2026, the School Office was also refurbished, giving a new modern design. It was announced that in September 2026, Adrian Meadows would become the school's Executive Principal, with Sam McCormick being appointed as headmaster.

== Academics ==
In the 2009 GCSEs, 56% achieved A*-A grades. The following year, it achieved a 100% pass rate with 64% gaining all A* or A grades.

In the 2026 GCSEs, 14% of all results were at Grade 9, there was a 94% pass rate and 30% of grades were at Grade 9-8. Headmaster, Sam McCormick, commented on this, saying "I am incredibly proud of our Year 11, who have produced such outstanding results".

In the 2026 A-Levels, there was a 100% pass rate, with all students gaining places at their chosen universities. The school also had the highest proportion of A* to B grades since before the pandemic.

== Heads of School ==
- May Florence Hill (1895-1919)
- Amy Mansfield (1919-1936)
- Helen Belgion (1936-1961)
- C Bowis (1961-1973)
- A Scott (1973-1977)
- Angela Storey (1977-1999)
- Sarah Dixon (1999-2007)
- Adrian Meadows (2007-2026)
- Sam McCormick (2026-)

== Houses ==
The Peterborough School has four houses, Eliot, after George Eliot and T.S. Eliot, Spencer, after Diana Spencer, Newton, after Isaac Newton and Mandela, after Nelson Mandela.

=== Battle of the Bands ===
The Peterborough School's Battle of the Bands is an annual interhouse competition, in which each House will form a band then compete to become the winning band and House.

==== Winners ====
- 2023 - Mandela (Sweet Caroline by Neil Diamond)
- 2024 - Eliot (I Will Survive by Gloria Gaynor)
- 2025 - Eliot (Medley of songs by ABBA)
- 2026 - Spencer (Medley of popular songs)

In the past, Battle of the Bands was not an interhouse competition, but a chance for students to create their own bands to compete to be the winning band. It was made an interhouse competition in 2023.

=== House Day ===
Established in 2023, House Day is a full day where students are put into groups in their Houses and take part in nine different competitive activities, which win points for their House. At the end of the day, the House with the most points wins.

==== Winners ====
- 2023 - Eliot
- 2024 - Eliot
- 2025 - Spencer
- 2026 - Mandela

=== History of Houses ===
The names of the Houses of the Peterborough School have changed approximately five times. Before Eliot, Spencer, Newton and Mandela, the school's Houses were Ryder, after Sue Ryder, Nightingale, after Florence Nightingale, Fonteyn, after Margot Fonteyn and Gaskell, after Elizabeth Gaskell.

== School musicals ==
- 2007 - The Wizard of Oz
- 2008 - Oliver!
- 2017 - Elf
- 2018 - Annie
- 2019 - Mermaid
- 2022 - The Addams Family
- 2023 - Arthur King
- 2024 - Chicago
- 2025 - Grease
- 2026 - Oliver!
- 2027 - Mamma Mia!
