= Boundstone Community College =

Location
- Upper Boundstone Lane; Sompting, West Sussex, BN15 9QZ; England; 50°50′09″N 0°19′49″W

Information
- Established: 1935
- Closed: 2009
- Local authority: West Sussex
- Specialist: Arts College
- Department for Education URN: 126074 Tables
- Ofsted: Reports
- Headteacher: Y. Williams
- Gender: Coeducational
- Age: 11 to 18
- Enrolment: 1,000 pupils
- Website: http://www.boundstone.w-sussex.sch.uk/

Boundstone Community College was a co-educational comprehensive school for pupils aged 11 to 18, with around 1,000 pupils, including over 100 in the Sixth Form, which served the communities of Lancing and Sompting. The school closed on 31 August 2009, being replaced by the Sir Robert Woodard Academy.

== History ==
Lancing Senior Mixed Council School opened in Irene Avenue, Lancing in 1935, in the buildings currently occupied by the Globe Primary School. The original site was intended to accommodate up to 360 pupils between the ages of 11 and 14. It was moved to its current site on Boundstone Lane in 1960 where it became Lancing Secondary Modern School. Pupils wishing to attend grammar school travelled to either Worthing or Shoreham.

Boundstone became one of the "Comprehensives" from the autumn term of 1963, continuing to cater for an intake from 11 years old upwards – five forms plus a two-year Sixth. The first comprehensive intake graduated from the Sixth Form in 1970.

In 1975, West Sussex County Council reorganised provision in the area. Boundstone became a comprehensive upper school for pupils aged 12 and over, while younger pupils stayed at primary middle schools until this age. In 2008, this change was reverted, and Boundstone once again became a full secondary school for pupils aged 11 to 18.

The school closed on 31 August 2009, being replaced by an academy operated by a partnership between West Sussex County Council and the Woodard Schools organisation. The new academy is called the Sir Robert Woodard Academy.

== Campus ==
The college was based on, and named after Boundstone Lane, the historic boundary between the villages of Sompting and Lancing, the two main communities which the college served. The boundstone or boundary stone which marked the boundary between the villages survives and was kept at the college, which was entirely on the Sompting side of the boundary.

At the time of the change to the age of transfer of pupils, a new building was completed to house new Year 7 pupils. After the renaming to Woodard Academy, the school was completely rebuilt on its existing site, and the 1960s buildings were demolished in early 2012.

== Curriculum ==
Boundstone Community College was designated a specialist college for the performing arts in 2002.

The academy which replaced the school has twin specialisms of Performing Arts and Mathematics.
