= Woodard Schools =

Group of Anglican schools

Woodard Schools is a group of Anglican schools (both primary and secondary) affiliated to the Woodard Corporation (formerly the Society of St Nicolas) which has its origin in the work of Nathaniel Woodard, a Church of England priest in the Anglo-Catholic tradition.

The Woodard Corporation has schools in both the independent (fee paying) and maintained sectors. It is the largest group of Church of England schools in England and Wales. The corporation owns 21 independent schools and is affiliated with 22 schools, both state, academy and independent. The flagship school of the Woodard Corporation is Lancing College, founded by Nathaniel Woodard in 1848, while the largest school is The Littlehampton Academy, with over 1,500 students. From 1 January 2014, Broadwater Manor School in Worthing was also owned by Lancing College and this group.

'... till the Church educates and trains up the middle classes, she can never effectually educate the poor'

— Nathaniel Woodard, That One Idea, by Leonard and Evelyn Cowie

== Owned schools ==
- Ardingly College
- Ardingly College Prep School
- Ardingly College Pre-Prep School
- Bloxham School
- Denstone College
- Denstone College Preparatory School
- Ellesmere College
- Hurstpierpoint College
- Hurstpierpoint College Prep School
- King's College, Taunton
- King's Hall School, Taunton
- Lancing College
- Lancing College Preparatory School, Hove
- Lancing College Preparatory School, Worthing
- Prestfelde School
- Queen Mary's School
- The Cathedral School, Llandaff
- The Peterborough School
- Worksop College
- Ranby House School

== Affiliated schools ==
- Alderley Edge School for Girls
- Bishop Stopford School
- Crompton House Church of England Academy
- Malosa Secondary School, Malawi
- St Peter's Collegiate Academy
- St Marylebone Church of England School
- St Olave's and St Saviour's Grammar School
- St Peter's Church of England Aided School
- St Saviour's and St Olave's Church of England School
- The Bishop of Hereford's Bluecoat School
- The Bishops' Blue Coat Church of England High School
- The King's School, Rochester

== Academies ==
Woodard Schools are the lead sponsors of a number of schools in the English Academy system. Woodard Schools adopt a strong religious ethos and seek to foster an actively Christian environment.

- Kings Priory School
- St Augustine Academy, Maidstone
- St Peter's Academy, Stoke-on-Trent
- St Wilfrid's Church of England Academy, Blackburn
- The Littlehampton Academy - replaces the existing Littlehampton Community School
- The Sir Robert Woodard Academy - replaces the existing Boundstone Community College

== Former schools ==
- Abbots Bromley School, Rugeley, Staffordshire
- The Bolitho School, Cornwall
- Cawston College
- Grenville College
- Queen Ethelburga's Collegiate
- Queen Margaret's School
- St Margaret's School, Exeter
- S.Michaels Burton Park, Petworth closed 31 August 1994.
- St Winifred's School
